= Marys River Peak =

Mountain in Nevada, United States

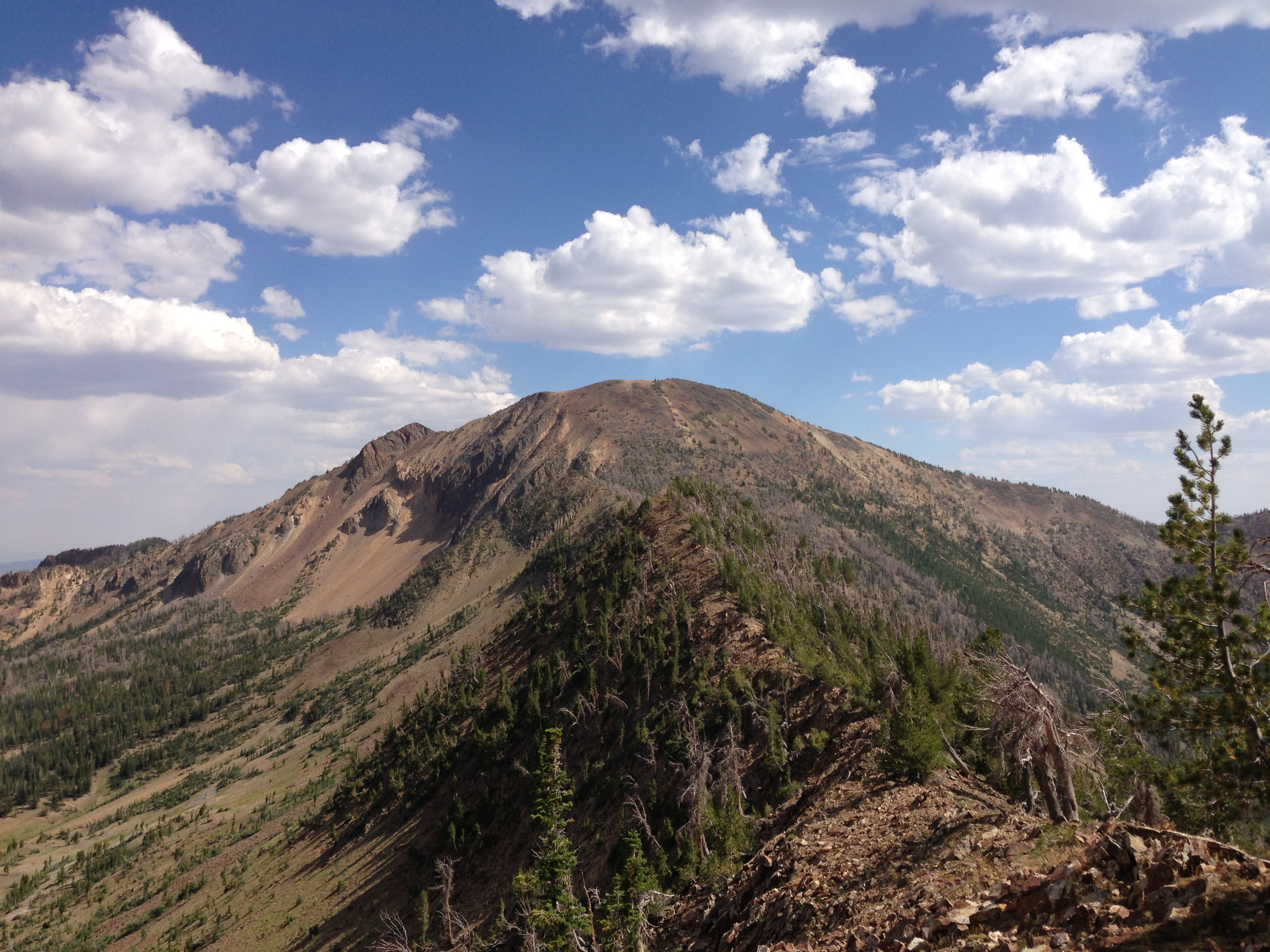
- View of Marys River Peak from Emerald Lake Pass

Highest point
- Elevation: 10,575 ft (3,223 m)
- Prominence: 730 ft (223 m)
- Coordinates: 41°45′34″N 115°21′43″W

Geography
- Location within Nevada
- Location: Elko County, Nevada, U.S.
- Topo map: USGS Gods Pocket Peak

Marys River Peak is the highest mountain in the Marys River Range of northern Elko County, Nevada, United States. It is located within the Jarbidge Wilderness, which is administered by the Jarbidge Ranger District of the Humboldt-Toiyabe National Forest. The peak's name is derived from the Marys River, a tributary of the Humboldt.

== Summit panorama ==
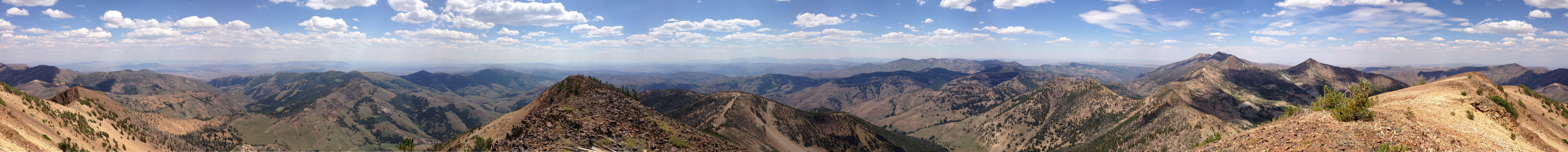
360-degree panorama from the summit of Marys River Peak
