= Murphy Hot Springs, Idaho =

Unincorporated community in Owyhee County, Idaho, United States

- Unincorporated community
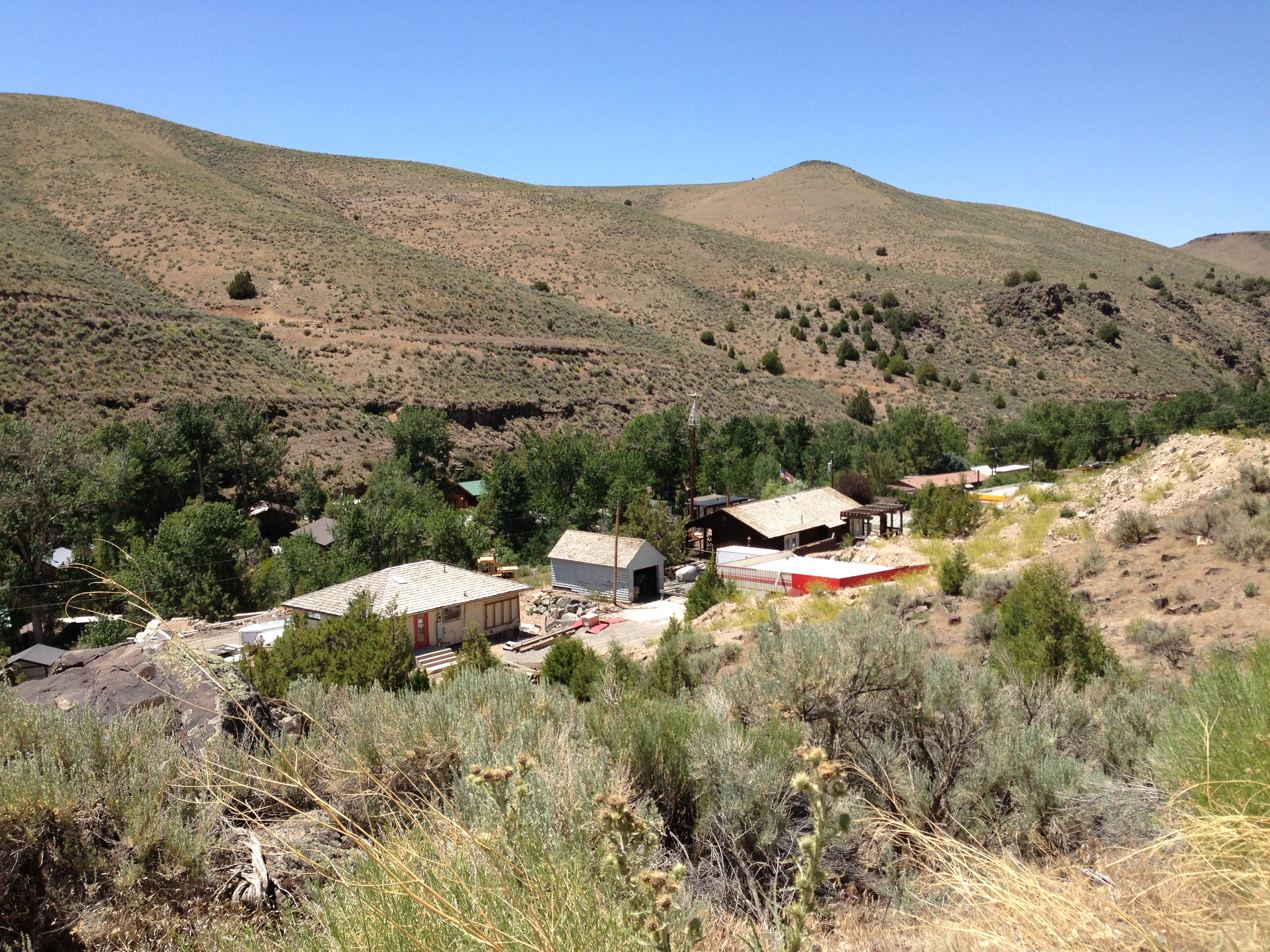
- Murphy Hot Springs, June 2013

- Location within Idaho Location within the United States
- Coordinates: 42°01′26.8602″N 115°21′36.6588″W
- Country: United States
- State: Idaho
- County: Owyhee
- Establishment: 1885

Population (1995)
  - Total: 8−14
- Time zone: UTC-7 (Mountain (MST))
  - Summer (DST): UTC-6 (MDT)

Murphy Hot Springs is an unincorporated community in Owyhee County, Idaho, United States.

== History ==
The area where the springs, and thus the community, is located was firstly discovered by the local native population.

John R. Wilkins heavily invested in the herding of horses back in Tuscarora, Nevada; however, in 1879, on New Year's Eve, the Wilkins house hotel got incinerated by a fire, leading the family to find a new place to stay.

The Wilkins back in Tuscorora had heard numerous rumors from the Bruneau Valley settlers refugees (Which were forced to leave in order to escape from Chief Buffalo Horn, during the Bannock War of 1878) about a territory in Idaho whom they called the "Valley of Tall Grass".

Kittie Wilkins (the daughter of John), and her brother, discovered the hot spring whilst searching for stray horses in the area, in a summer of an unspecified year in the early 1880s.

They connected the Spring to various trails that led to neighbouring communities, and created a wall made out of stone to keep their livestock within the area from fleeing. Both are still peculiar landmarks of the small communities today.

John R. Wilkins had already built a house in the area in 1885 and declared the birth of the small community.

As early as in the 1880s, gold was found in the area around the East fork; and in the 1890s, Kittie and her buckaroos found a golden piece the size of a walnut, which led them to discover a local abandoned mine.

This led to a big gold rush, and many camps to be set in the area in order to find and mine gold at the start of the 1900s.

In 1911, on a publication of the "Saturday Evening Post", Novelist Maude Radford Warren described the community at the time like this:

Men camped everywhere - on the clearing, across the stream, and by the side of the road. Some had wagons and tents the horses were picketed. Everywhere men walked and sat, smoked and talked, and looked up towards a trail along which the pack mules were slowly moving to Jarbridge.

— Maude Radford Warren

Around this time, the "Wilkins Horse Company at Bruneau’s Diamond Ranch", led by Kittie, flourished.

Meanwhile, the springs fell into the hands of a Patrick Murphy, a new settler not affiliated with the Wilkins, who developed a small resort on the property and renamed it "Murphy Hot Springs".

An airport nearby was soon built, known as the "Murphy Hot Springs airport", which in the first half of the 20th century served the spring and Murphy, who'd at the time would pick you up at the airstrip.

Back in 1995, when correspondents of Deseret News visited the area, the community had 8 to 14 residents.

== Geography ==
Murphy Hot Springs sits at an elevation of approximately 5,380 feet (1,640 m) in the canyon of the East Fork Jarbidge River, near the Idaho–Nevada state line. The community lies close to the Jarbidge Wilderness and is reached solely by Three Creek Road, an unpaved route that crosses open rangeland before descending into the river canyon. The surrounding terrain transitions from high-desert sagebrush steppe to mountainous cottonwood-lined riparian corridor along the river.

== Description ==
The community is located along Three Creek Road between Rogerson, Idaho and Jarbidge, Nevada at the bottom of the East Fork Jarbidge River's canyon. As of 2007, the community contains approximately 50 homes. The resort that once operated at the springs is no longer open to the public; as of the early 2020s only a handful of private cabins remain in use, with no public bathing or lodging facilities available.

== Airport ==
Murphy Hot Springs is served by a state-owned backcountry airstrip, identifier 3U0, with a single turf runway (01/19) measuring 5,250 by 120 feet (1,600 by 37 m) at an elevation of 5,829 feet (1,777 m). The strip once served visitors to the hot springs resort, whose owner would meet arriving pilots at the airstrip; it now has no fuel, services, or attendant, and camping under the wing is permitted for visiting pilots. The runway can become soft in wet conditions, and pilot reports note it is not regularly mowed or dragged.

== Recreation ==
The area around Murphy Hot Springs offers access to several primitive, seasonal campgrounds, including Juniper Grove, Big Cottonwood, and The Forks on the Idaho side of the border. These sites are generally accessible from April through October, with unpaved access roads becoming difficult to travel in winter. The nearby Jarbidge Wilderness provides hiking trail access, including via the Camp Draw Trailhead, and the East Fork Jarbidge River offers fishing opportunities.

== Climate ==
The hottest temperature recorded in Murphy Hot Springs was 102 °F (38.9 °C) on July 15, 2014, while the coldest temperature recorded was −27 °F (−32.8 °C) on February 2, 1996.

Climate data for Murphy Hot Springs, Idaho, 1991–2020 normals, extremes 1987–present
Month	Jan	Feb	Mar	Apr	May	Jun	Jul	Aug	Sep	Oct	Nov	Dec	Year
Record high °F (°C)	65 (18)	65 (18)	75 (24)	86 (30)	91 (33)	99 (37)	102 (39)	99 (37)	98 (37)	91 (33)	77 (25)	70 (21)	102 (39)
Mean maximum °F (°C)	56.7 (13.7)	59.4 (15.2)	66.1 (18.9)	76.2 (24.6)	82.9 (28.3)	91.6 (33.1)	96.7 (35.9)	95.4 (35.2)	91.0 (32.8)	81.0 (27.2)	68.3 (20.2)	58.5 (14.7)	97.4 (36.3)
Mean daily maximum °F (°C)	40.7 (4.8)	42.7 (5.9)	49.6 (9.8)	55.3 (12.9)	65.4 (18.6)	75.2 (24.0)	86.3 (30.2)	85.0 (29.4)	76.5 (24.7)	62.3 (16.8)	48.5 (9.2)	39.9 (4.4)	60.6 (15.9)
Daily mean °F (°C)	29.1 (−1.6)	30.7 (−0.7)	36.8 (2.7)	41.5 (5.3)	49.9 (9.9)	57.4 (14.1)	66.2 (19.0)	65.1 (18.4)	56.9 (13.8)	45.6 (7.6)	35.2 (1.8)	27.8 (−2.3)	45.2 (7.3)
Mean daily minimum °F (°C)	17.5 (−8.1)	18.8 (−7.3)	24.1 (−4.4)	27.6 (−2.4)	34.5 (1.4)	39.6 (4.2)	46.2 (7.9)	45.1 (7.3)	37.4 (3.0)	28.9 (−1.7)	21.9 (−5.6)	15.7 (−9.1)	29.8 (−1.2)
Mean minimum °F (°C)	−0.4 (−18.0)	2.7 (−16.3)	12.2 (−11.0)	17.2 (−8.2)	23.7 (−4.6)	30.9 (−0.6)	37.9 (3.3)	35.4 (1.9)	28.0 (−2.2)	17.1 (−8.3)	5.6 (−14.7)	−0.3 (−17.9)	−6.3 (−21.3)
Record low °F (°C)	−17 (−27)	−27 (−33)	2 (−17)	11 (−12)	18 (−8)	18 (−8)	21 (−6)	23 (−5)	24 (−4)	−2 (−19)	−6 (−21)	−23 (−31)	−27 (−33)
Average precipitation inches (mm)	1.12 (28)	0.95 (24)	1.16 (29)	2.24 (57)	2.29 (58)	1.21 (31)	0.72 (18)	0.54 (14)	0.88 (22)	1.00 (25)	1.31 (33)	1.29 (33)	14.71 (372)
Average snowfall inches (cm)	6.5 (17)	10.2 (26)	8.3 (21)	4.1 (10)	0.6 (1.5)	0.0 (0.0)	0.0 (0.0)	0.0 (0.0)	0.0 (0.0)	0.5 (1.3)	7.2 (18)	9.9 (25)	47.3 (119.8)
Average precipitation days (≥ 0.01 in)	7.7	7.8	9.8	11.3	11.0	6.2	4.6	5.0	4.9	6.6	8.5	8.4	91.8
Average snowy days (≥ 0.1 in)	4.1	4.8	4.4	1.8	0.3	0.1	0.0	0.0	0.0	0.7	3.5	5.5	25.2
Source 1: NOAA
Source 2: National Weather Service
