= Coon Creek Peak =

Mountain in Elko County, Nevada, US

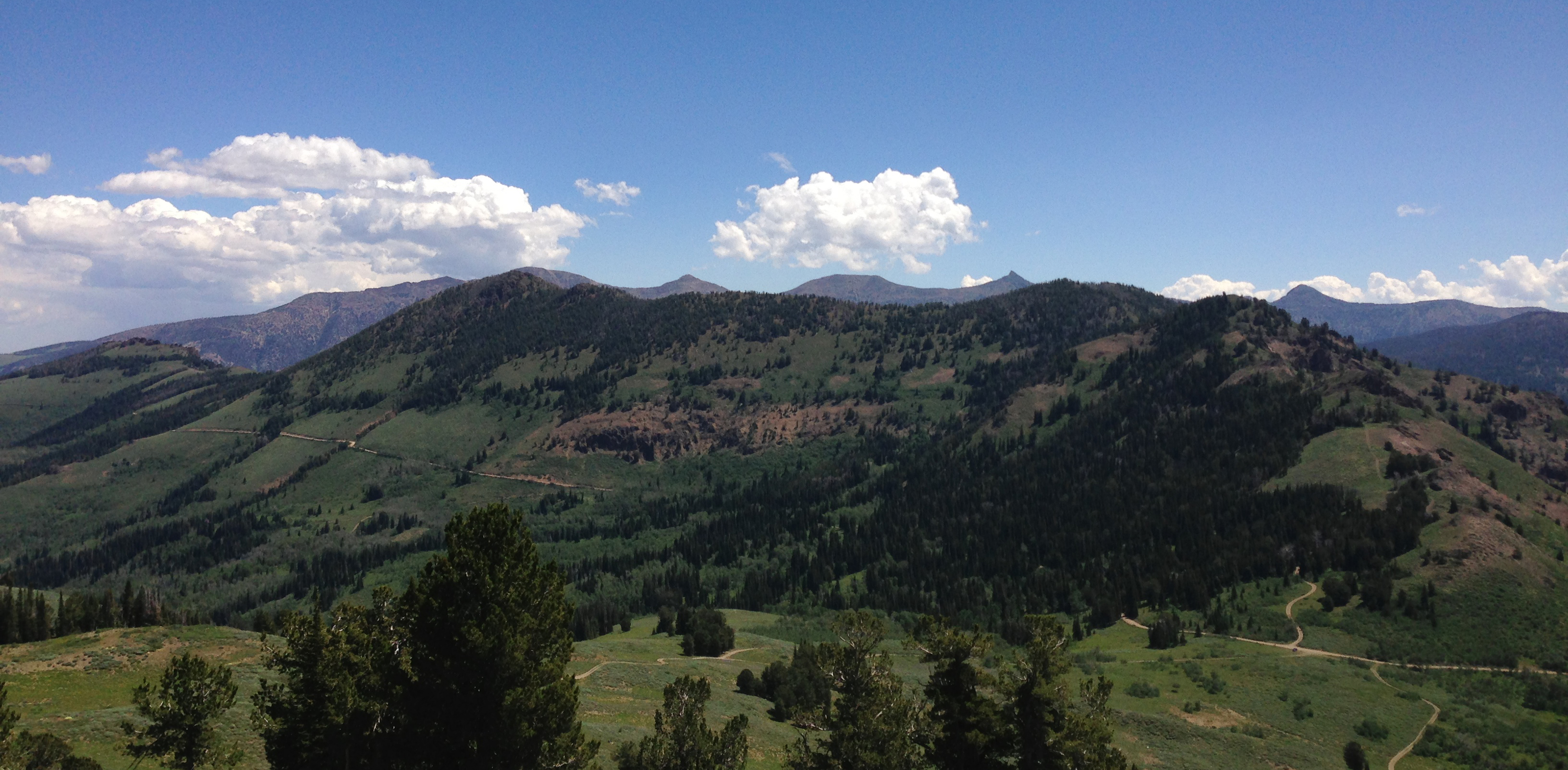
- Coon Creek Peak viewed from the west, with the Jarbidge Mountains in the background

Highest point
- Elevation: 9,528 ft (2,904 m) NAVD 88
- Coordinates: 41°48′29″N 115°28′07″W

Geography
- Location within Nevada
- Location: Elko County, Nevada, U.S.
- Topo map: USGS Jarbidge South

Coon Creek Peak is a mountain in northern Elko County, Nevada, about 4 miles southwest of the community of Jarbidge. It is considered to be the most northeasterly peak of the Copper Mountains. Located a few miles west of the main crest of the Jarbidge Mountains, it is located within the Jarbidge Ranger District of the Humboldt-Toiyabe National Forest. The main road entering Jarbidge from the south, Charleston-Jarbidge Road (National Forest Road 062 and Elko County Route 748), runs along the western slopes of the mountain as it travels between Coon Creek Summit and Bear Creek Summit, providing close vehicular access to the summit of Coon Creek Peak.
