= Marys River Range =

Mountain range in Nevada, United States

- Location within Nevada

Highest point
- Peak: Marys River Peak
- Elevation: 3,223 m (10,574 ft)

Geography
- Country: United States
- State: Nevada
- District: Elko County
- Range coordinates: 41°45′1.671″N 115°18′7.228″W
- Topo map: USGS Gods Pocket Peak

The Marys River Range is a mountain range in Elko County, Nevada, United States. It is contained within the Jarbidge Wilderness, which is administered by the Jarbidge Ranger District of the Humboldt–Toiyabe National Forest. The range is considered to be a sub-range of the Jarbidge Mountains. The range's name is derived from the Marys River, a tributary of the Humboldt, the headwaters of which lie within the range near Marys River Peak, the range highpoint. The highest point in the Marys River Watershed is also the highest point in the Coast Range.
