= Brownstone Canyon Archaeological District =

Historic district in Nevada, United States

- Brownstone Canyon Archeological District
- U.S. National Register of Historic Places
- U.S. Historic district
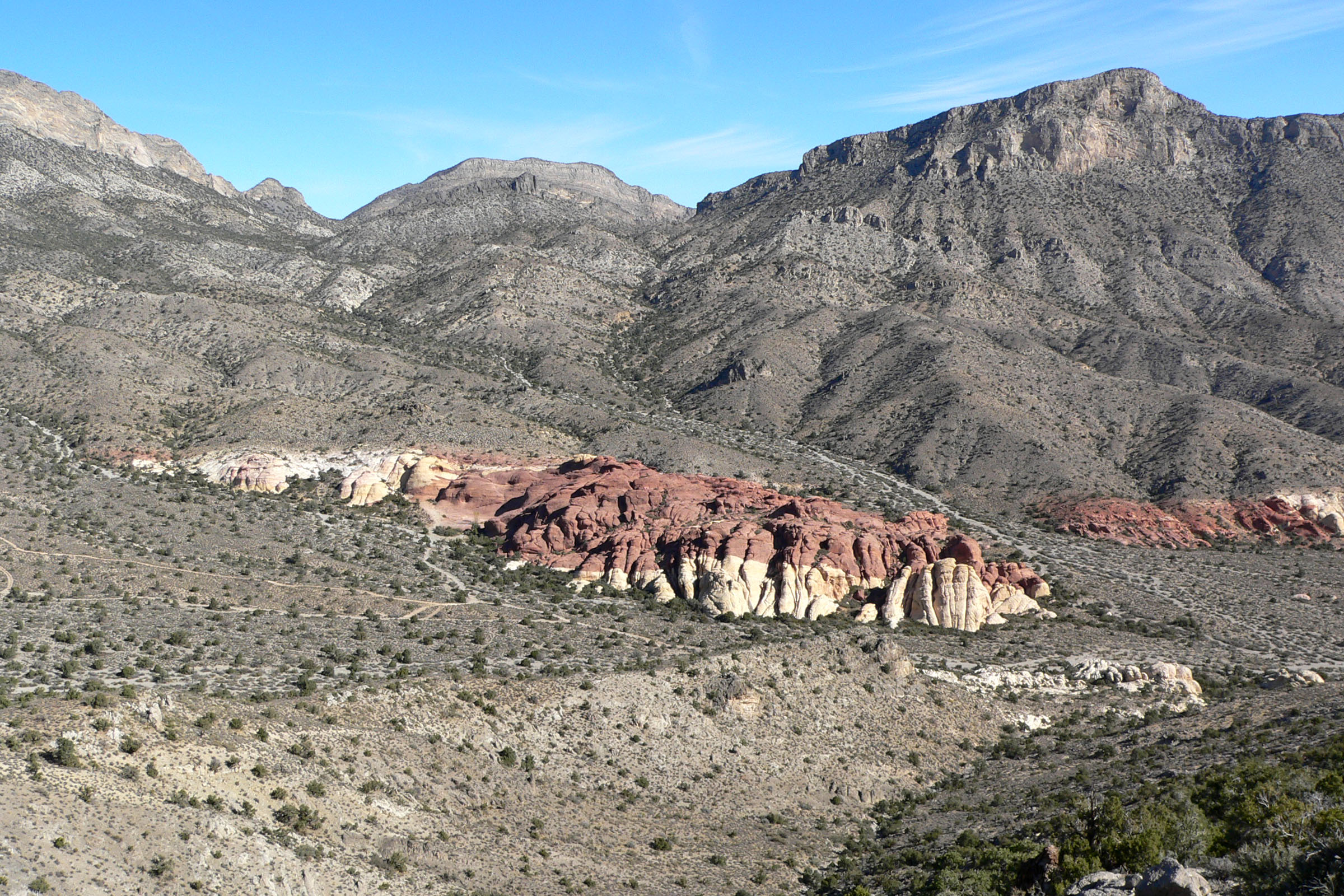
- Brownstone Basin seen from Turtlehead Peak

- Location within Nevada Location within the United States
- Location: Clark County, Nevada
- Nearest city: Las Vegas, Nevada
- Coordinates: 36.184°N 115.425°W
- NRHP reference No.: 82003212
- Added to NRHP: September 22, 1982

Brownstone Canyon Archaeological District comprises 2,920 acres (1,180 ha) and is located in the La Madre Mountain Wilderness Area which covers 47,180 acres (19,090 ha) in southern Nevada. The area is administered by the Humboldt-Toiyabe National Forest and the Bureau of Land Management and includes many petroglyphs.

== History ==
The district was listed on the National Register of Historic Places on September 22, 1982 for its significance during the period of 1975–2000.
