= Ben Kuhl =

Stage coach robber

Ben E. Kuhl
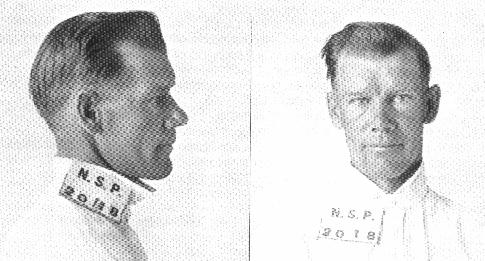
- Mugshot of Ben Kuhl, 1917
- Born: 1884; Michigan
- Died: 1945 (aged 61–62); Northern California
- Occupations: stage coach robber, mail robber, horse thief, baker, drifter
- Known for: Robbery of a mail stage wagon
- Height: 6 ft (1.8 m)
- Spouse: Minnier
- Children: 1 son
- Status: Commuted
- Motive: Financial
- Conviction: Murder
- Criminal charges: robbery, murder
- Penalty: Death
- Accomplices: Ed Beck, Billy McGraw

Details
- Victims: Fred M. Searcy
- Date: December 5, 1916; 6:30 PM
- Country: United States
- States: Northern California, Nevada, Idaho, Oregon
- Location: Jarbidge
- Target: mail stage wagon
- Killed: 1
- Weapon: .44 caliber

Ben E. Kuhl (1884 – after May 7, 1945) was, in 1916, the last known stagecoach robber in the United States. Kuhl took part in the robbery of a mail stage wagon in Jarbidge, Nevada, US, the driver, Fred M. Searcy, was killed. The incident became a myth: "Staging a Robbery Without a Coach". While most of the evidence against him was circumstantial, a bloody palm print on an envelope led to Kuhl's conviction. Kuhl's trial, which began in September 1917, was noted to be the first time palm prints were used as evidence in a U.S. courtroom. State v. Kuhl also set the precedent that palm prints were as valid as fingerprints in criminal cases for identifying individuals.

== Biography ==
Ben Kuhl was from Michigan. In 1903, he was jailed in Marysville, California for petty larceny, and had also been sentenced to 1 to 10 years in Oregon for horse theft. Kuhl arrived in Lander County, Nevada in 1916 and lived in a tent with two others drifters, Ed Beck and Billy McGraw. He worked as a cook at the OK Mine for about a month before he was fired for attempting to jump another man's mining claim. He was arrested for trespassing in Jarbidge.

The Jarbidge Stage Robbery occurred on December 5, 1916, just before 6:30 PM. The mail wagon from Three Creek, Idaho, drawn by two horses, was ambushed. Searcy was killed by a .44 caliber slug to the head, and about $4,000 was stolen. While the money was never recovered, almost fifty pieces of evidence were collected. Kuhl, Beck, McGraw, and another acquaintance, B.E. Jennings, were caught soon after the incident occurred. Most of the evidence against Kuhl was circumstantial. However, there was a bloody palm print on a letter from the wagon's mail pouch; and Kuhl became the first American convicted of murder based on a palm print. His death sentence was commuted to life in prison at the Nevada State Prison in Carson City, Nevada, but he was paroled on May 7, 1945.

Kuhl was slender and nearly 6 feet (1.8 m) tall; he had light blue eyes. His wife, Minnier (nicknamed "Minnie"), and a son lived in Salt Lake City, Utah; she divorced Kuhl after the conviction. His mother lived in Kalamazoo, Michigan; his father in Walla Walla, Washington. Kuhl is thought to have died of pneumonia or tuberculosis in northern California, possibly Sacramento or San Francisco, within 6 to 12 months of his release.
