= Copper Mountain (Nevada) =

Mountain in Nevada, United States

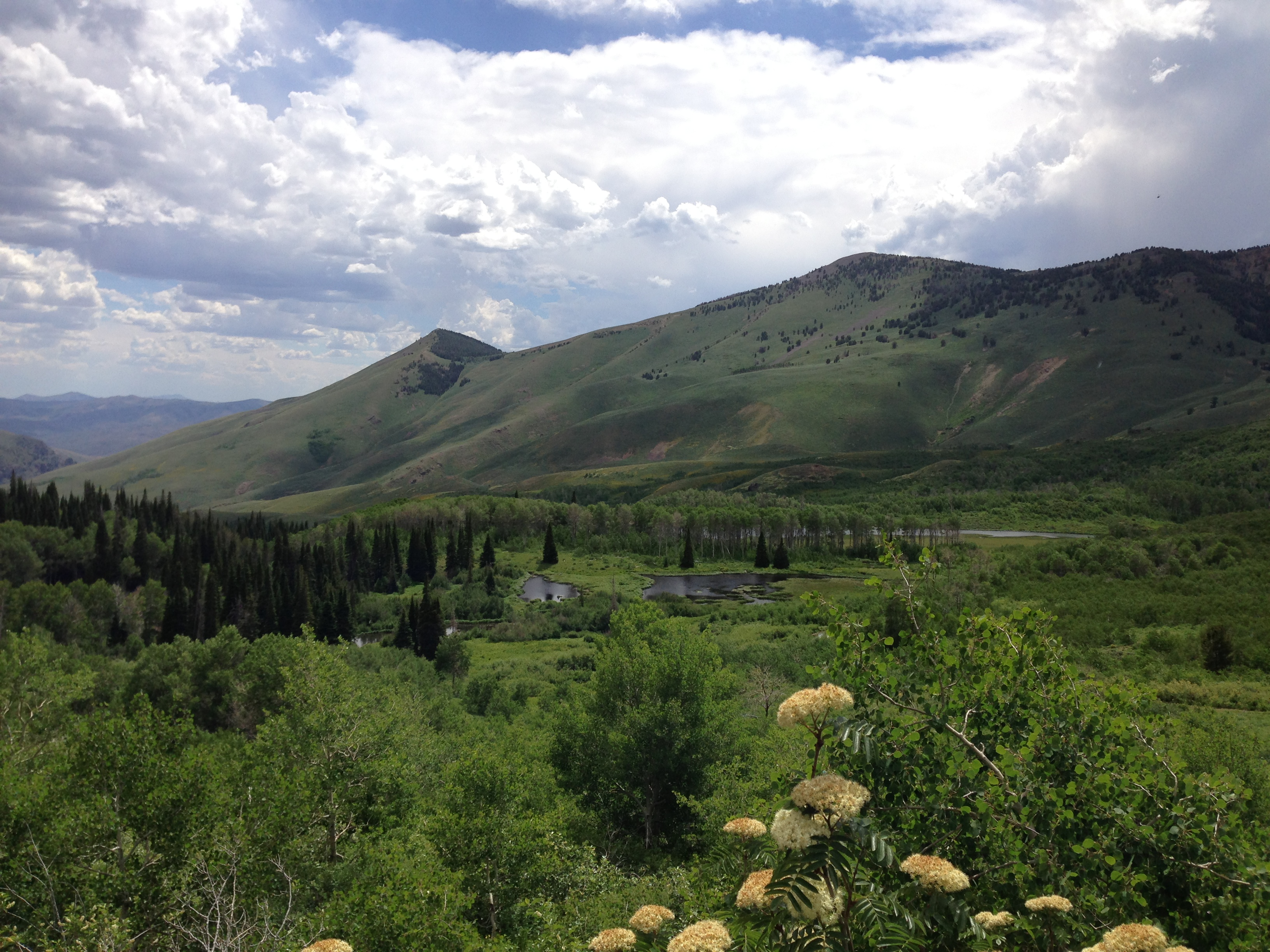
- View of Copper Mountain from Charleston-Jarbidge Road in Copper Basin

Highest point
- Elevation: 9,917 ft (3,023 m) NAVD 88
- Prominence: 1,470 ft (448 m)
- Coordinates: 41°46′15″N 115°31′15″W

Geography
- Location within Nevada
- Location: Elko County, Nevada, U.S.
- Parent range: Copper Mountains

Copper Mountain is the highest mountain in the Copper Mountains of northern Elko County, Nevada, United States. It is located within the Mountain City Ranger District of the Humboldt-Toiyabe National Forest.

== Summit panorama ==
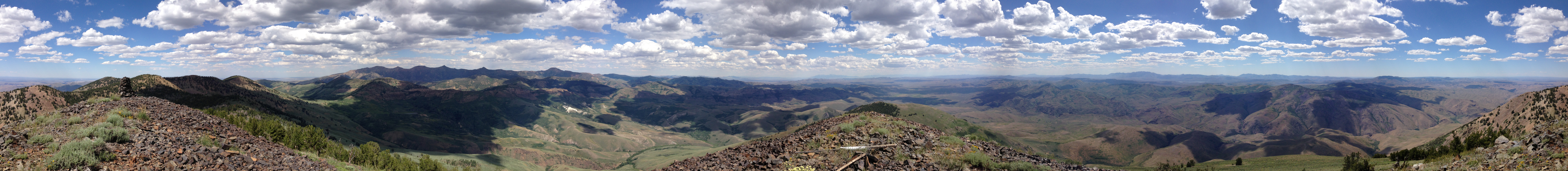
360-degree panorama from the summit of Copper Mountain
