= Fox Creek Range =

Mountain range in Elko County, Nevada, US

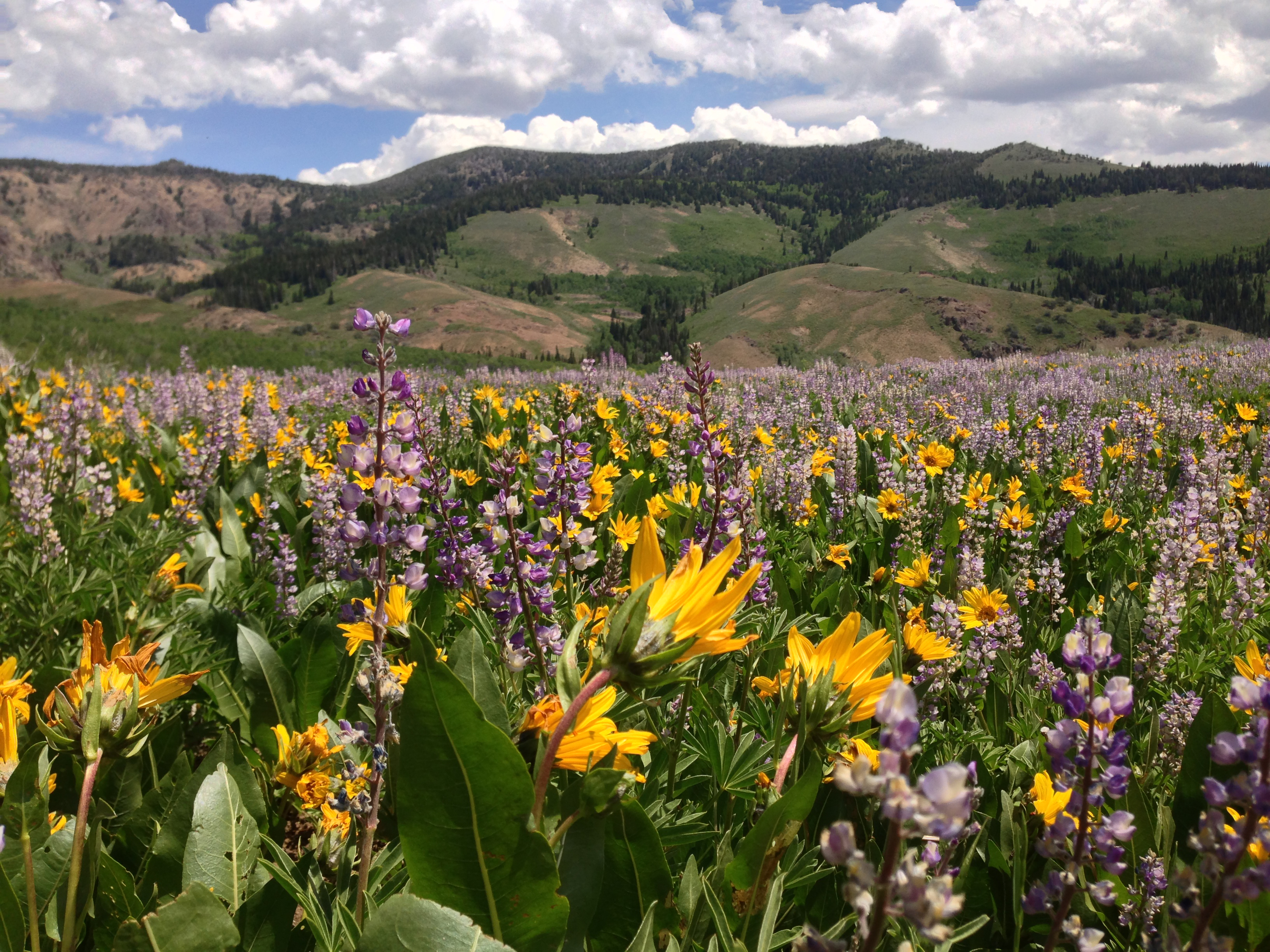
- View of the Fox Creek Range from Copper Basin during summer wildflower season

Highest point
- Elevation: 2,132 m (6,995 ft)

Geography
- Location within Nevada
- Country: United States
- State: Nevada
- District: Elko County
- Range coordinates: 41°39′30.673″N 115°26′53.246″W
- Topo map: USGS Marys River Basin NW

The Fox Creek Range is a mountain range in Elko County, Nevada, United States. It is mostly contained within the Jarbidge Ranger District of the Humboldt–Toiyabe National Forest. The range is considered to be a sub-range of the Jarbidge Mountains.
