= Charleston, Nevada =

- Ghost town
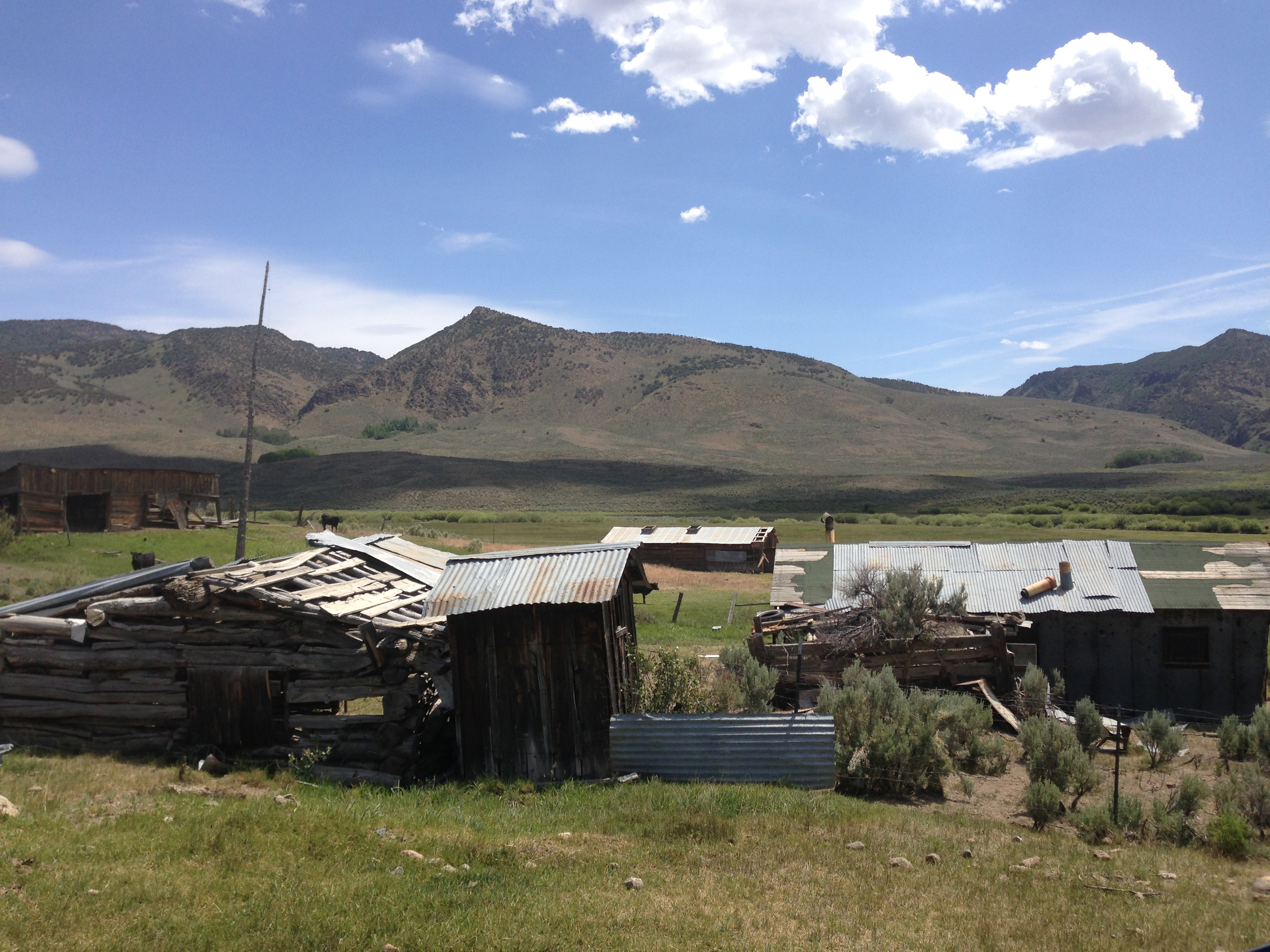

- Location within the state of Nevada Charleston, Nevada (the United States)
- Coordinates: 41°40′15″N 115°30′38″W
- Country: United States
- State: Nevada
- County: Elko
- Established: 1876
- Elevation: 6,076 ft (1,852 m)
- Time zone: UTC-8 (Pacific (PST))
  - Summer (DST): UTC-7 (PDT)

Charleston is a ghost town in Elko County, Nevada, United States. It lies along the Bruneau River just south of the Mountain City and Jarbidge Ranger Districts of the Humboldt-Toiyabe National Forest and is near the southwest edge of the Jarbidge Wilderness.

== History ==
The Charleston settlement was established in 1876 when gold was discovered in Seventy-Six Creek, at the southwestern base of Copper Mountain. The camp was originally called Mardis, but was soon named Charleston after a local prospector, Tom Charles. The settlement grew quickly, with the building of a hotel, saloons, schools, stores and an icehouse. By 1884, most mining operations had stopped.

A post office was established at Charleston in 1895, and remained in operation until 1951.

The camp revived in 1905, when the local mines started producing again. A five-stamp mill was built at the time. Another re-opening of the mines occurred during the period 1932 to 1937. The mines are now abandoned and the two remaining builds from the settlement are on private property.

The population was 60 in 1940.

== Climate ==
There is a weather station for Charleston roughly 1 mile (1.6 km) to the north, situated at an elevation of 5968 ft (1819 m). Charleston has a humid continental (Köppen Dfb), closely bordering on a subarctic climate (Köppen Dfc).

Climate data for Charleston Jarbidge 17 SSW, Nevada, 2003–2014 normals, 1961–2017 extremes: 5968ft (1819m)
Month	Jan	Feb	Mar	Apr	May	Jun	Jul	Aug	Sep	Oct	Nov	Dec	Year
Record high °F (°C)	56 (13)	62 (17)	72 (22)	80 (27)	89 (32)	98 (37)	103 (39)	98 (37)	92 (33)	87 (31)	72 (22)	58 (14)	103 (39)
Mean maximum °F (°C)	43.9 (6.6)	48.5 (9.2)	60.5 (15.8)	71.0 (21.7)	79.6 (26.4)	86.8 (30.4)	94.8 (34.9)	92.0 (33.3)	87.0 (30.6)	77.8 (25.4)	64.6 (18.1)	50.2 (10.1)	95.2 (35.1)
Mean daily maximum °F (°C)	33.7 (0.9)	36.5 (2.5)	45.3 (7.4)	53.7 (12.1)	63.4 (17.4)	73.1 (22.8)	86.8 (30.4)	83.5 (28.6)	75.4 (24.1)	61.3 (16.3)	47.2 (8.4)	36.0 (2.2)	58.0 (14.4)
Daily mean °F (°C)	17.4 (−8.1)	21.3 (−5.9)	30.8 (−0.7)	38.3 (3.5)	45.4 (7.4)	52.4 (11.3)	62.1 (16.7)	59.0 (15.0)	50.5 (10.3)	40.4 (4.7)	31.0 (−0.6)	20.9 (−6.2)	39.1 (4.0)
Mean daily minimum °F (°C)	1.1 (−17.2)	6.1 (−14.4)	16.2 (−8.8)	22.9 (−5.1)	27.6 (−2.4)	31.5 (−0.3)	37.5 (3.1)	34.4 (1.3)	25.8 (−3.4)	19.5 (−6.9)	15.2 (−9.3)	5.4 (−14.8)	20.3 (−6.5)
Mean minimum °F (°C)	−21.9 (−29.9)	−16.8 (−27.1)	−2.8 (−19.3)	9.1 (−12.7)	14.6 (−9.7)	22.4 (−5.3)	27.3 (−2.6)	23.8 (−4.6)	14.0 (−10.0)	6.3 (−14.3)	−6.6 (−21.4)	−16.3 (−26.8)	−26.5 (−32.5)
Record low °F (°C)	−39 (−39)	−39 (−39)	−28 (−33)	−2 (−19)	6 (−14)	15 (−9)	20 (−7)	15 (−9)	5 (−15)	−2 (−19)	−32 (−36)	−42 (−41)	−42 (−41)
Average precipitation inches (mm)	0.69 (18)	0.35 (8.9)	0.58 (15)	0.92 (23)	1.25 (32)	0.78 (20)	0.43 (11)	0.78 (20)	0.48 (12)	0.91 (23)	0.84 (21)	1.11 (28)	9.12 (231.9)
Average snowfall inches (cm)	14.1 (36)	6.4 (16)	5.0 (13)	3.3 (8.4)	0.3 (0.76)	trace	0.0 (0.0)	trace	0.2 (0.51)	0.5 (1.3)	3.6 (9.1)	13.8 (35)	47.2 (120.07)
Source: XMACIS2
