= Copper Mountains (Nevada) =

Mountain range in Elko County, Nevada, United States

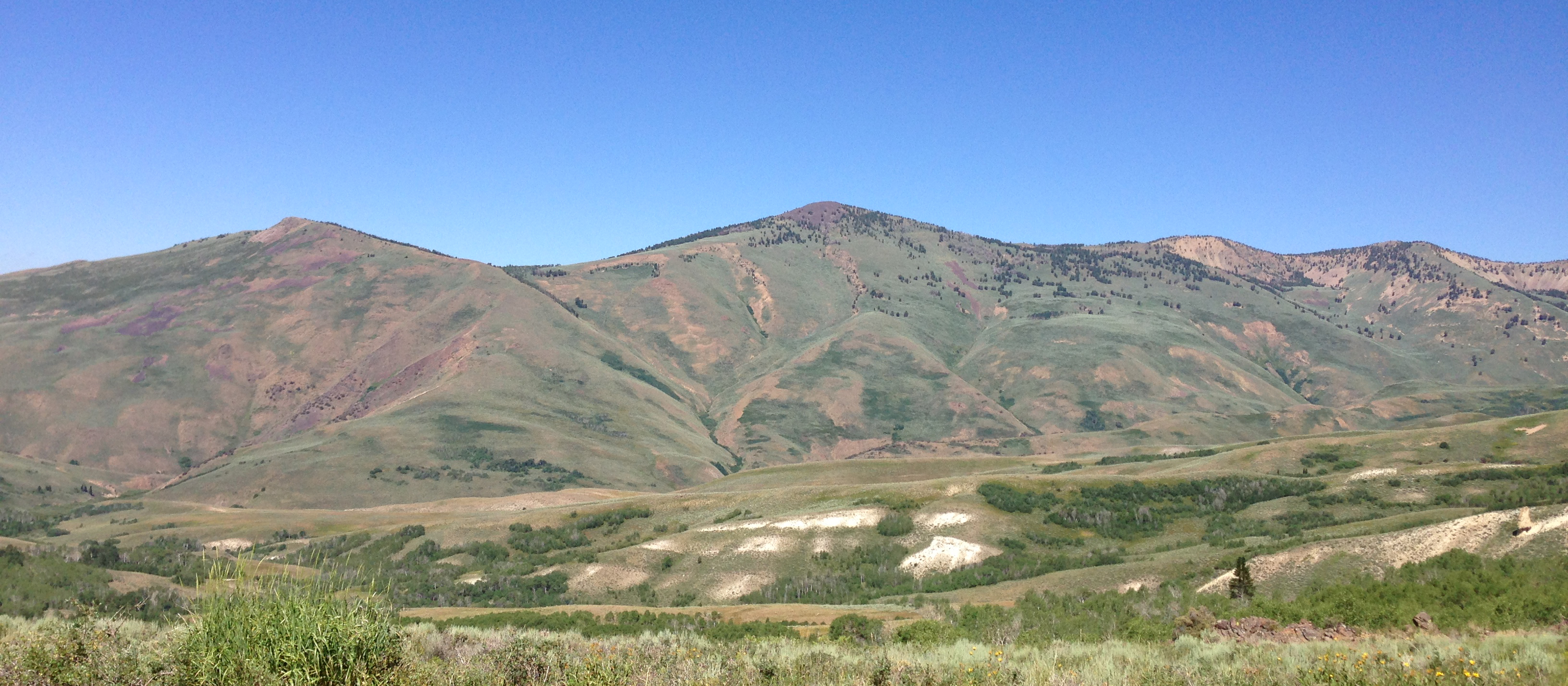
- View of the Copper Mountains from Copper Basin

Highest point
- Peak: Copper Mountain
- Elevation: 3,022 m (9,915 ft)
- Coordinates: 41°46′17″N 115°31′14″W

Geography
- Location within Nevada
- Country: United States
- State: Nevada
- District: Elko County
- Range coordinates: 41°46′17″N 115°31′14″W
- Topo map: USGS Coon Creek

The Copper Mountains are a mountain range in Elko County, Nevada, United States.

The range is contained mostly within the Mountain City Ranger District of the Humboldt-Toiyabe National Forest, though Coon Creek Peak is within the Jarbidge Ranger District.

== Geography ==
Named peaks include the high point, Copper Mountain, and two lesser peaks, Silver Mountain and Coon Creek Peak. It is considered by some to be a sub-range of the Jarbidge Mountains.

The valley of Coon Creek lies to the north, with Copper Basin to the east, the valley of Copper Creek to the southeast and the Bruneau River valley to the south, southwest and west. The core of the Jarbidge Mountains are located further east and northeast.
