= Jarbidge Lake =

Lake in Nevada, United States

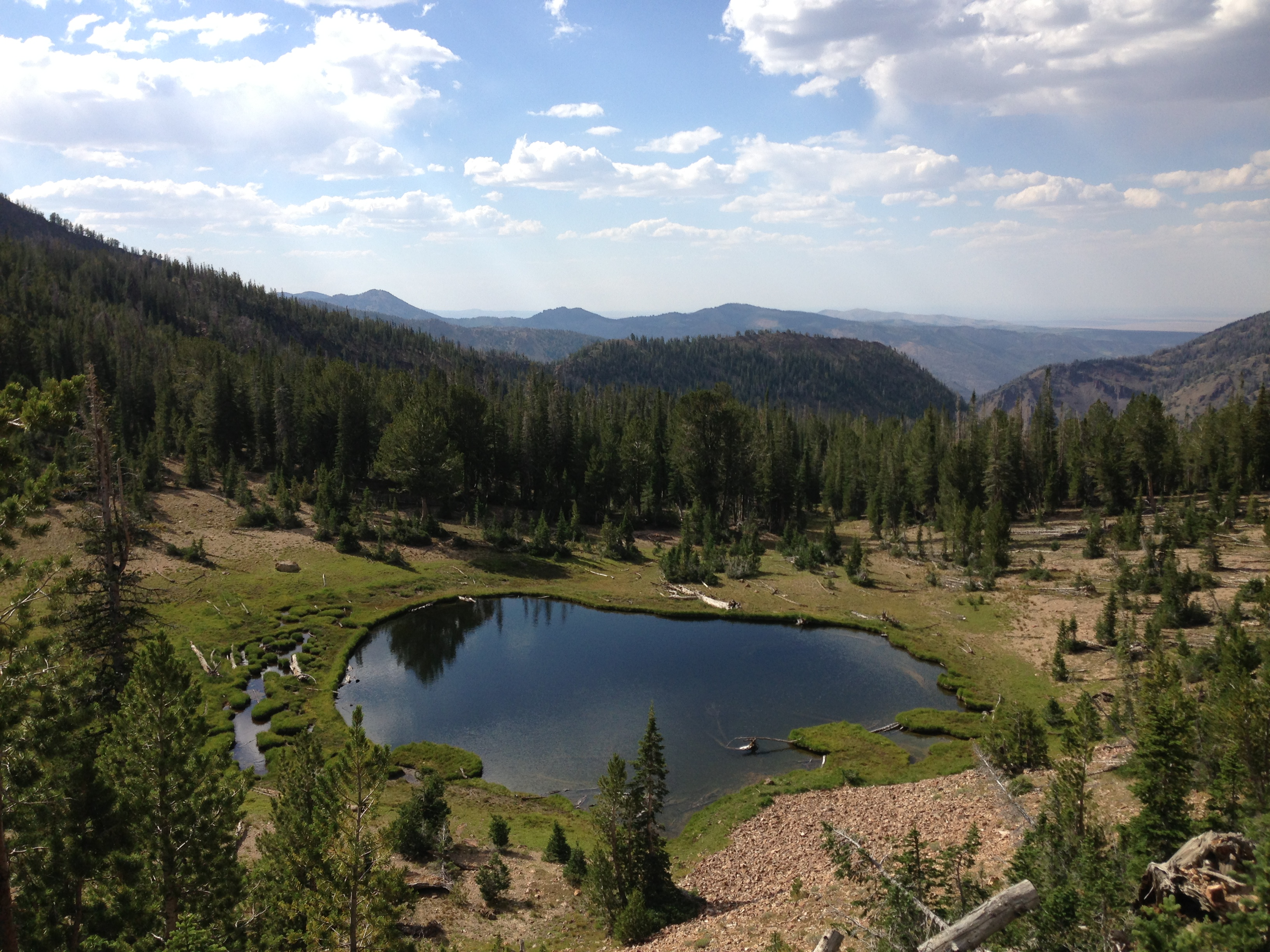

- Location in Nevada
- Location: Elko County, Nevada, United States
- Coordinates: 41°46′27.01″N 115°22′20.72″W
- Lake type: Tarn
- Primary outflows: Jarbidge River
- Basin countries: United States
- Surface elevation: 9,357 ft (2,852 m)

Jarbidge Lake is a glacial tarn in the Jarbidge Mountains of Elko County, Nevada, United States. It is within the Jarbidge Wilderness, which is administered by the Jarbidge Ranger District of the Humboldt-Toiyabe National Forest. The lake is near the southern terminus of the Jarbidge River Trail where it meets the West Marys River Trail and Emerald Lake Trail, and is just below Emerald Lake Pass. Jarbidge Lake is the principal source of the Jarbidge River.

"Jarbidge" is a name derived from the Shoshone language meaning "devil".
