= Copper Basin (Nevada) =

Basin in Nevada, United States

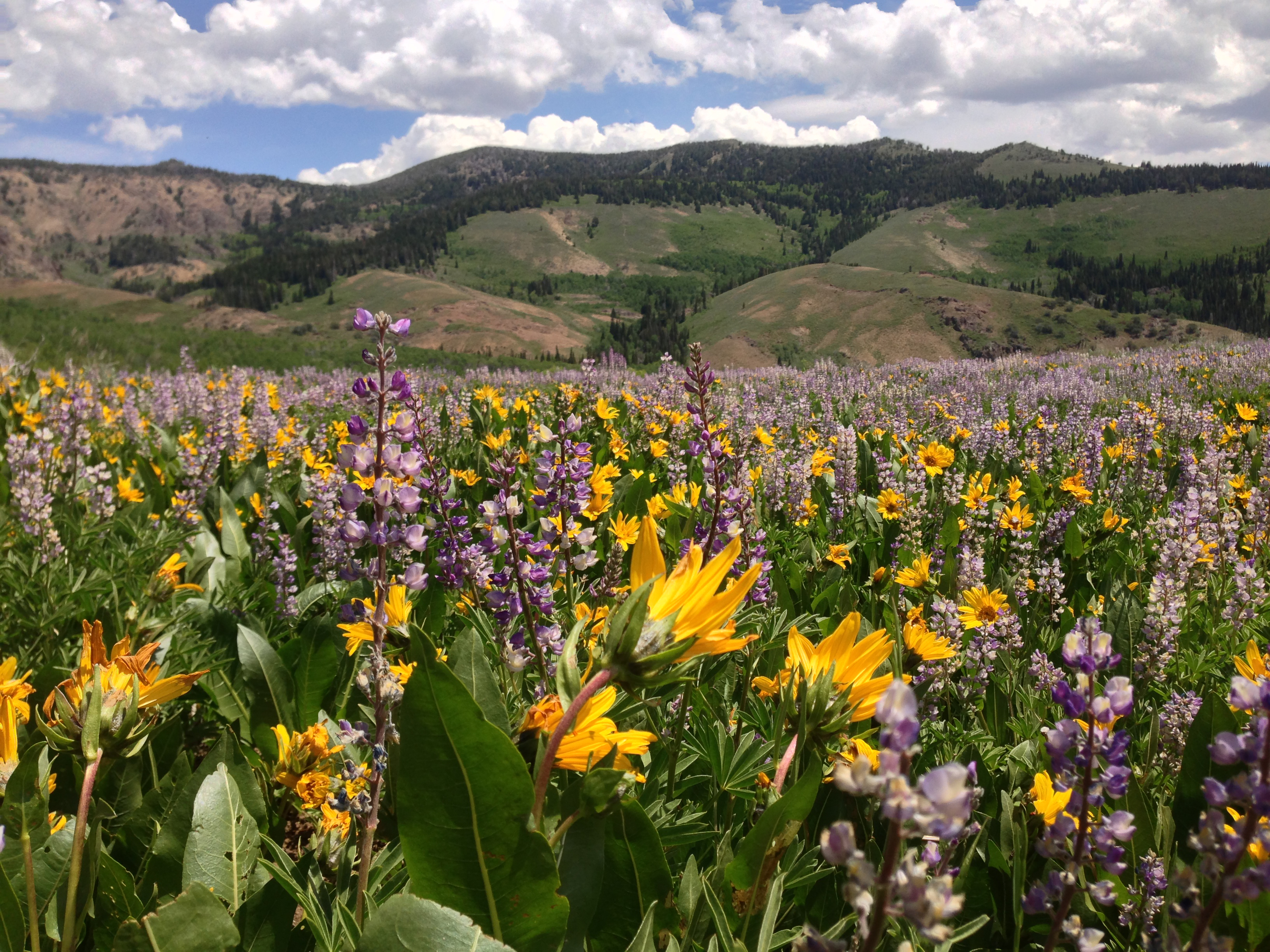
- Wildflowers in Copper Basin
- Floor elevation: 7,408 ft (2,258 m)

Geography
- Country: United States
- State: Nevada
- County: Elko
- Coordinates: 41°46′15″N 115°29′24″W
- Interactive map of Copper Basin

Copper Basin is a basin located between the Copper Mountains and Fox Creek Range of northern Elko County, Nevada, United States. The basin, located on the border of the Mountain City and Jarbidge ranger districts within the Humboldt-Toiyabe National Forest, is known for its displays of wildflowers during early summer. It is accessed via Elko County Route 748, also known as Charleston-Jarbidge Road, by way of either Charleston or Jarbidge.

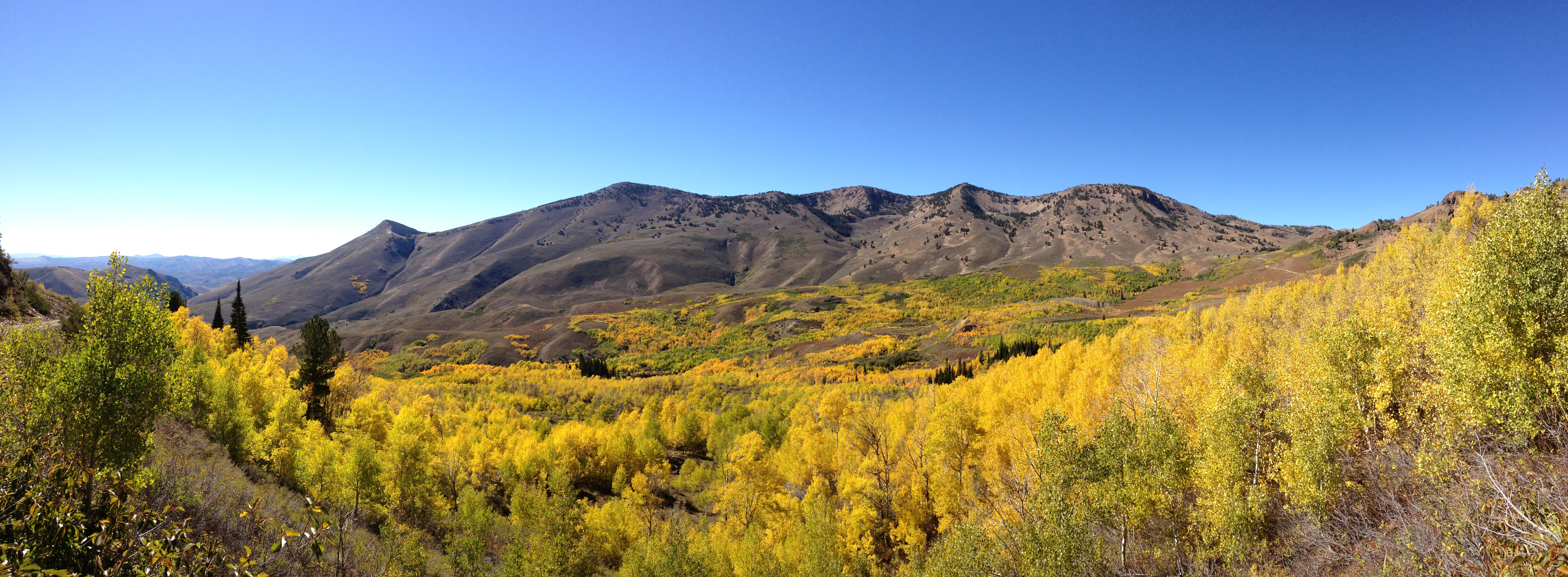
Autumn in Copper Basin, with the Copper Mountains in the background
