= Jarbidge Stage Robbery =

Last stage robbery in the American Frontier

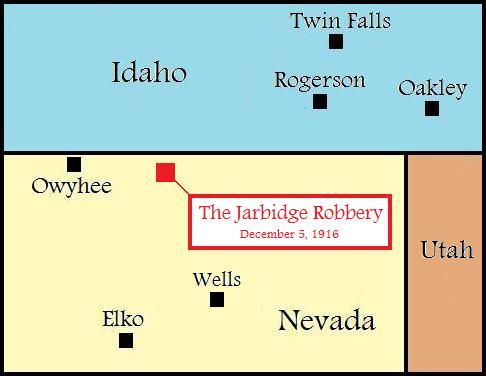
- Date: December 5, 1916
- Location: Jarbidge, Nevada, USA
- Outcome: Bandits steal $4,000
- Deaths: 1

The Jarbidge Stage Robbery was the last stage robbery in the Old West. On December 5, 1916, the driver of a small two-horse mail wagon was ambushed as he was riding to the town of Jarbidge, Nevada. The driver was killed and $4,000 was stolen. Three suspects were arrested shortly afterward, including a horse thief named Ben Kuhl. Kuhl would eventually become the first murderer in American history to be convicted and sent to prison by the use of palm print evidence. The stolen $4,000 was never recovered and is said to be buried somewhere in Jarbidge Canyon. According to author Ken Weinman, the Jarbidge Stage Robbery is one of the "best authenticated buried treasure stories in Nevada's long history."

== Background ==
In 1916, Jarbidge, Nevada, was one of the state's most isolated communities, located within Jarbidge Canyon, along the Jarbidge River. The town was founded as a tent city in 1909 due to a gold rush, which brought about 1,500 people to the area. Due to severe winters, the population had reduced to just a few hundred by the spring of 1910.

Due to its isolated location, technological advancements in the broader world were slow to reach Jarbridge. The only road into the town was a treacherous dirt road, and its only means of communication with the outside world was the United States Mail stage. Furthermore, in winter, twenty to thirty foot snow drifts could cut off the community for several weeks at a time. Automobiles had not yet made it to Jarbidge, so riding horses and driving wagons were still the main modes of transportation. Because Rogerson, Idaho, was the closest railroad town, wagon driver Fred Searcy made trips to Jarbridge to deliver both mail and company payrolls for the local miners.

== Robbery ==
The robbery took place on December 5, 1916. When Searcy failed to arrive in town at the expected time, a small group of men began to assemble at the post office, assuming that heavy snow was the cause of the delay. However, when Searcy still did not appear, Postmaster Scott Fleming asked a man named Frank Leonard to ride up to the top of Crippen Grade, a 2,000 foot decline in the road that led down to the canyon floor and the town. Leonard returned a few hours later, saying he could not find Searcy or the wagon. Fleming and the others became very concerned: Over four feet of snow had fallen that day, so it was possible that Searcy could have slid down the grade into the Jarbidge River. Fleming quickly formed a search party. Before leaving, he telephoned a woman named Rose Dexter, who lived about a half mile north of Jarbidge along the grade. According to Ken Weinman, Rose Dexter said that the stage had passed by her house earlier that day and that she waved to the driver. She also said that the driver was "huddled up on his seat with his collar pulled up over his face to form some protection from the blinding snow." The search party quickly found the mail wagon, less than a quarter of a mile from the town's main business district. The stage was pulled over on the side of the road and hidden behind a patch of willow trees. Fred Searcy was found "slumped in his seat and almost covered with snow." An unopened mail pouch was also uncovered, but the second pouch, containing $4,000 (approximately equivalent to $97,560 of 2019), was missing. Weinman says that at first the search party thought that Searcy had frozen to death in the extreme cold, but closer examination revealed that he had been shot in the head at a very close range. Powder burns in his hair and on his scalp were observed.

Because the snow storm that was raging showed no sign of letting up, the search party returned to town with the intention of continuing the investigation of the area on the following morning. So, on the next day, the search party attempted to re-enact the crime using evidence found at the crime scene. According to Weinman, it was determined that the assailant must have hidden in the sagebrush along the road and jumped aboard the wagon to kill Searcy and take control. However, Nevada State Archivist Guy Rocha claims that Ben Kuhl later confessed to the murder and said that he killed Searcy over a dispute about how to split the money, alleging that Searcy was in on the crime.

After the re-enactment, another patrol around the area was made and the searchers found both human and dog footprints in the snow. The tracks led down to the river, where a blood-stained shirt was found lying on the bank. A stray dog that had been following the group happened to dig up the second mail pouch. The bottom was cut open and $4,000 in bills and gold coins was missing. The clue was an important find, but the fact that the dog had seemed to know its exact location raised suspicions that the animal tracks the group was following were made by the stray dog itself. The search party compared the dog's feet to the footprints in the snow and found a perfect match. Deciding that Ben Kuhl was the member of the group whom the dog was most attached to, they judged that the dog would have the greatest chance of following him through the storm.

== Aftermath ==
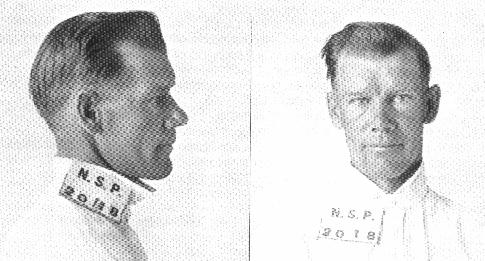
A mug shot of Ben Kuhl at Nevada State Prison in 1917.

Kuhl and two of his associates, Ed Beck and William McGraw, were arrested at their cabin without any trouble. A .44 caliber ivory-handled revolver was found in their possession. According to Ken Weinman, Kuhl proclaimed his innocence, saying that he spent the night in the Jarbidge saloon. Witnesses confirmed that they saw Kuhl in the saloon, but because they could not say at what time, their testimony was insignificant. Indeed, Kuhl could have left the bar, committed the crime, and then returned in a relatively short amount of time. After his arrest, a background check revealed that Kuhl had a long criminal record. In 1903, he served four months in jail at Marysville, California for petty larceny and, at some other time, he was sent to the Oregon State Penitentiary for stealing horses. Furthermore, Kuhl had recently been released from jail on a $400 bond and had previously been arrested in Jarbidge for trespassing on private property.

The trial was held in the Elko County Courthouse. District Judge Errol J. L. Taber presided over the case, and District Attorney Edward P. Carville was the prosecutor. The evidence gathered by the search party was all circumstantial, but two forensic scientists from California linked a bloody palm print on an envelope to Kuhl. For this, Judge Taber sentenced Kuhl to death and allowed him to choose the method of execution. Kuhl chose execution by firing squad, but the Nevada Board of Pardons later commuted his sentence to life in prison. Beck received a life sentence as well and McGraw turned state's evidence. All three were transferred to the Nevada State Prison together in October 1917.

Kuhl spent almost twenty-eight years in prison before his release on May 16, 1945. At the time of his release, Kuhl had served more prison time in Nevada than anyone else in the state's history. Weinman says that the $4,000 was never recovered and that Kuhl never admitted to the crime or the existence of buried money, even though the police offered him a reduced sentence if he revealed its location. Beck was paroled on November 24, 1923.

Today, the town of Jarbidge is still isolated and has a population of less than 100. Many of the old buildings that stood during the time of the robbery are still intact, including the jail house in which Kuhl was held. In 1998, a plaque was placed in front of the jail, reading:

Jarbidge Jail. Built after the town was removed from the U.S. Forest by a 1911 Presidential proclamation it replaced the constable's home or Forest Service cabin to restrain rowdy miners and hold suspects for arrival of a sheriff deputy. A colorful story tells of a burly miner frequently using the bunk to raise the roof to slip out and return to the saloon, climbing back in his cell before morning. Most noted prisoner was Ben Kuhl, who robbed the Rogerson-Jarbidge stage in December 1916, killing Fred Searcy the driver, the last mail stagecoach robbery in the U.S. and the first conviction based on a bloody palm print. It was last used about 1945. Dedicated June 13, 1998 by Lucinda Jane Saunders. Chapter 1881 E. Clampus Vitus.

== See also ==
- List of homicides in Nevada
- Pearl Hart
