= Independence National Forest =

Region of Humboldt National Forest

Independence National Forest in Nevada was established as the Independence Forest Reserve by the U.S. Forest Service on 5 November 1906 with 135,019 acres (546.40 km^{2}). It became a National Forest on 4 March 1907. On 1 July 1908 the entire forest was combined with Humboldt National Forest and the name was discontinued.
