= Nevada National Forest =

National Forest in Nevada

Nevada National Forest was established by the U.S. Forest Service in Nevada on February 10, 1909 with 556,072 acres (2,250.34 km^{2}). On July 1, 1932 the entire Toiyabe National Forest was added. On October 1, 1957 the forest was divided between Humboldt National Forest and the reinstated Toiyabe National Forest, and the name was discontinued. The Spring Mountains in Clark County of southern Nevada were in the former Nevada National Forest.
