= Toquima National Forest =

Discontinued National Forest of the US Forest Service in Nevada

Toquima National Forest was established by the U.S. Forest Service in Nevada on April 15, 1907 with 368,000 acres (1,490 km^{2}). On July 1, 1908 the entire forest was transferred to Toiyabe National Forest and the name was discontinued.
