= Jarbidge River =

River in Nevada and Idaho, United States

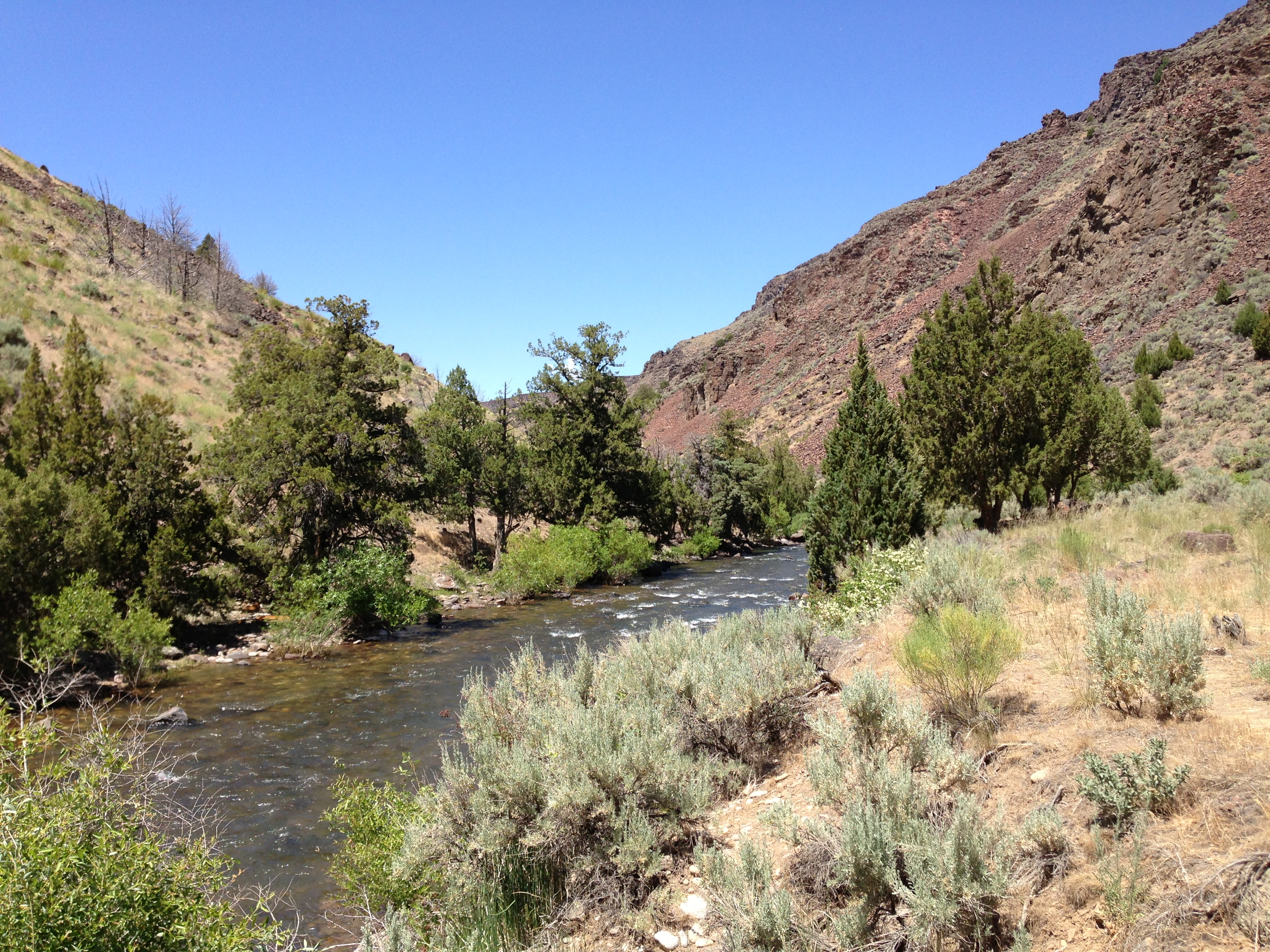
- View down the Jarbidge River near its confluence with the East Fork Jarbidge River

- Location of the mouth of the Jarbidge River in Idaho Jarbidge River (the United States)

Location
- Country: United States
- State: Idaho, Nevada
- Counties: Owyhee County, Idaho, Elko County, Nevada

Physical characteristics
- Source: Jarbidge Lake
  - location: Jarbidge Mountains, Elko County, Nevada
  - coordinates: 41°46′27″N 115°22′21″W
  - elevation: 9,357 ft (2,852 m)
- Mouth: Bruneau River
  - location: Bruneau – Jarbidge Rivers Wilderness, Owyhee County, Idaho
  - coordinates: 42°19′45″N 115°39′09″W
  - elevation: 3,707 ft (1,130 m)
- Length: 52 mi (84 km)
- Basin size: 660 sq mi (1,700 km^{2})

National Wild and Scenic River
- Type: Wild
- Designated: March 30, 2009

The Jarbidge River is a 51.8-mile-long (83.4 km), high elevation river in Elko County, Nevada, and Owyhee County, Idaho, in the United States. The Jarbidge originates as two main forks in the Jarbidge Mountains of northeastern Nevada and then flows through basalt and rhyolite canyons on the high plateau of the Owyhee Desert before joining the Bruneau River.

"Jarbidge" is a name derived from the Shoshone language meaning "devil". Indians believed the nearby hills were haunted.

== Geography ==
The small town of Jarbidge, Nevada, is located on the main stream, the source of which is Jarbidge Lake (41°46′27″N 115°22′21″W). The town of Murphy Hot Springs, Idaho, is located on the river's main tributary, the East Fork Jarbidge River, about two miles above the confluence of the streams (42°03′N 115°23′W); this is the last road access to the river canyon until the Bruneau River. For approximately 28 miles (45 km) this narrow river twists and turns northwest through a remarkable canyon, deep and rugged, but often dotted with groves of juniper trees along the banks. The Jarbidge Canyon is about 650 feet (200 m) deep at the confluence of the forks, and about 1,000 feet (300 m) deep at the confluence with the Bruneau. Once joining the Bruneau, the waters flow on to the Snake River and ultimately the Columbia River; therefore, it is one of very few rivers in northern Nevada that eventually empties into the Pacific Ocean. Tributaries include Buck Creek, Dave Creek, Columbet Creek, Dorsey Creek, Cougar Creek, and Poison Creek.

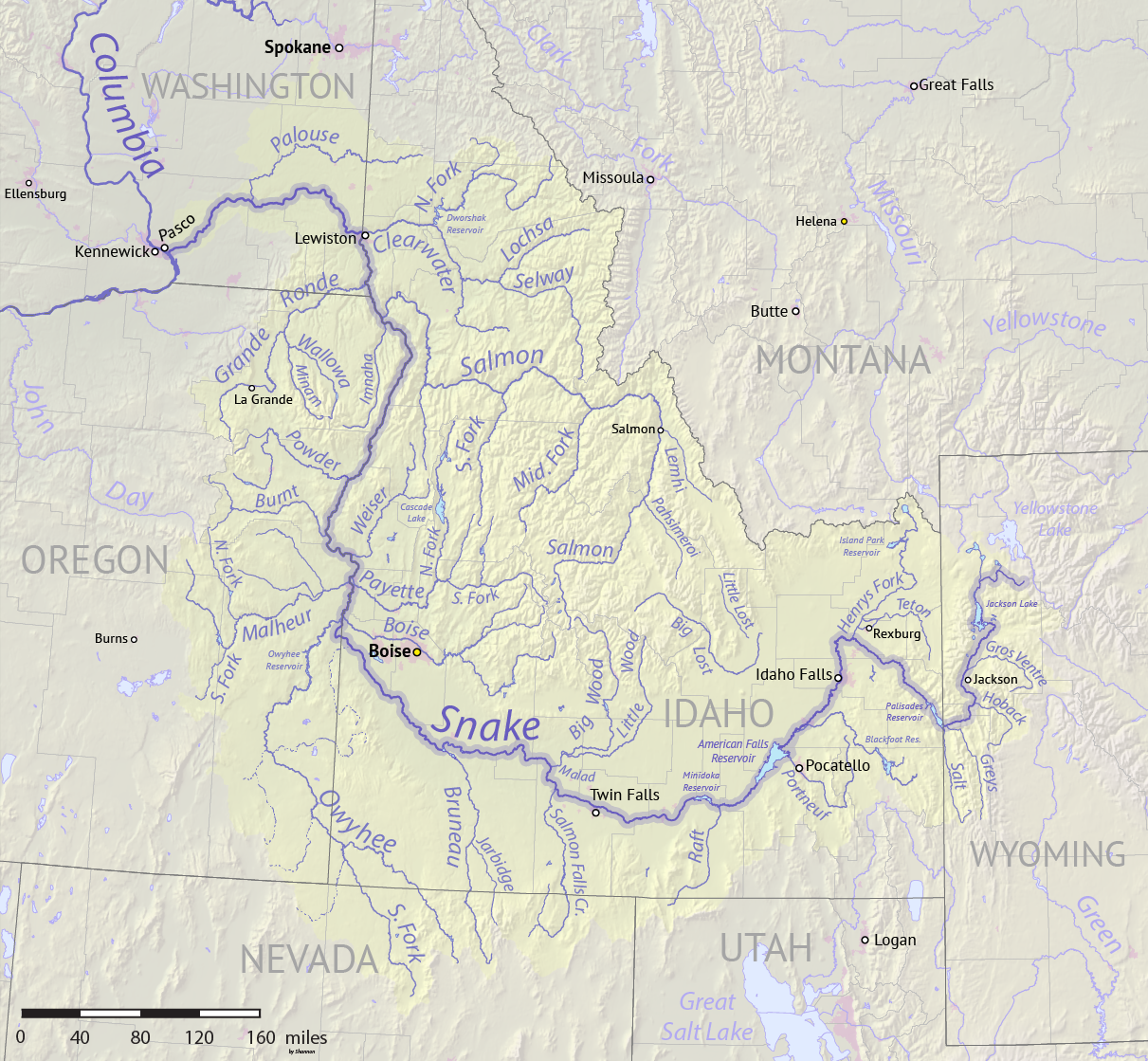
The Jarbidge River begins in Northern Nevada and flows thru southern Idaho before joining the Bruneau River.

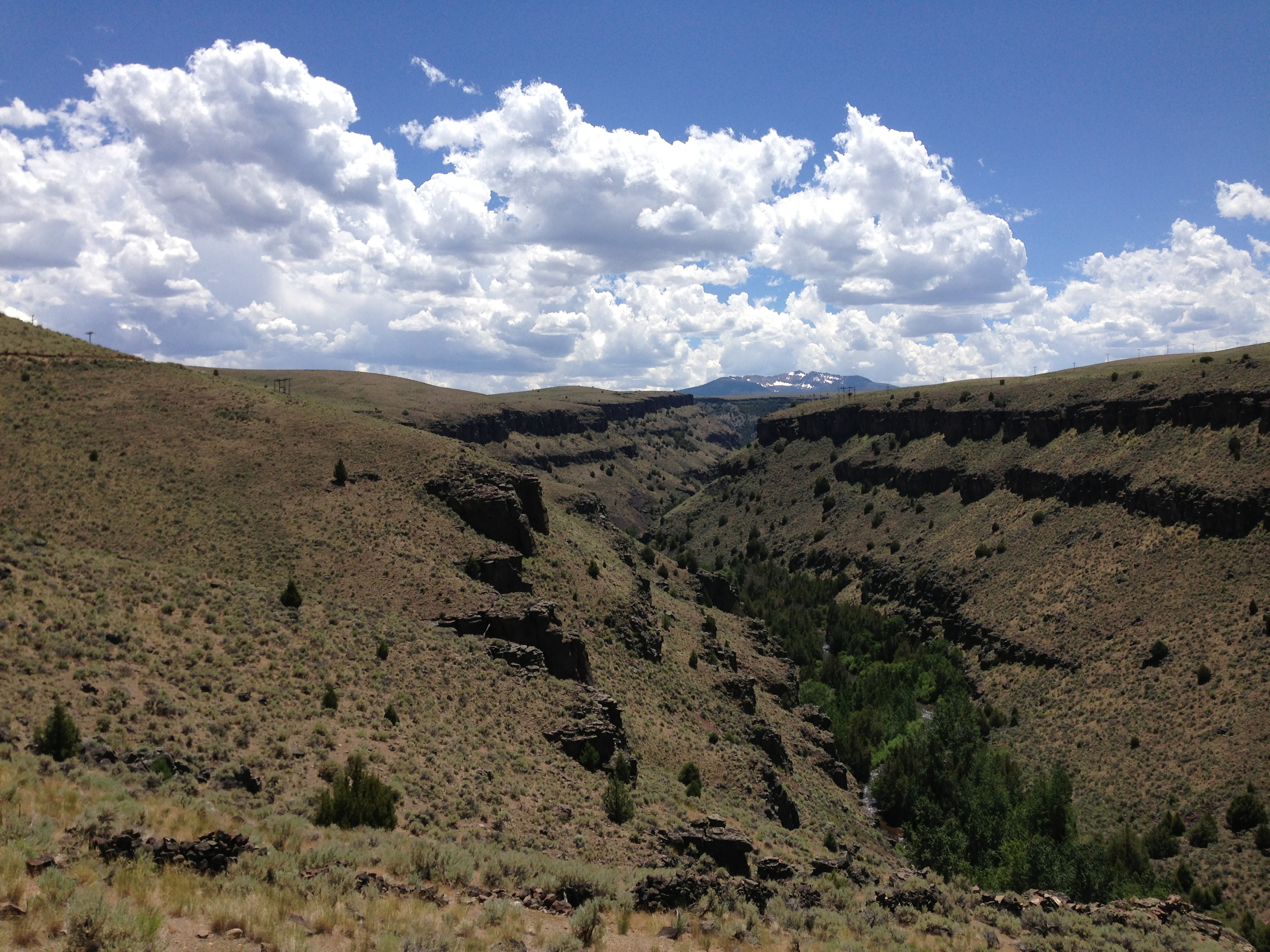
East Fork Jarbidge River Canyon in far southern Idaho

== Whitewater boating ==
The river is quite cold; though swimming is possible, there is a danger of hypothermia. Flow rates vary wildly. Kayaking is possible in certain sections in early summer; class IV. The river can also be run by experienced rafters. For rafters, the run can be arduous, with log jams inevitably requiring portages, lining rafts down rapids, or simply heaving rafts up and over the blockage. For the well-seasoned and adventurous, however, this river provides a spectacular journey filled with class III and IV rapids before the Jarbidge runs into the Bruneau River. Rafters and kayakers should be aware that towards the end of this run (approximately 25 miles (40 km) below Murphy Hot Springs), looms Jarbidge Falls. Jarbidge Falls is a class V+ run and should only be run by expert kayakers. A huge, row home-sized boulder blocking half the river signals the beginning of this rapid.

== Access ==
Access to the river is preferably via 4 wheel drive or ATV. The Big Bend (National Forest Service) campground is located nearby (8 miles (13 km)) and is suitable for day-tripping to the river. Access is near impossible from other locations in Nevada until about June/July due to snowdrifts across the mountainous access roads; otherwise access is from Idaho.

== Conservation ==
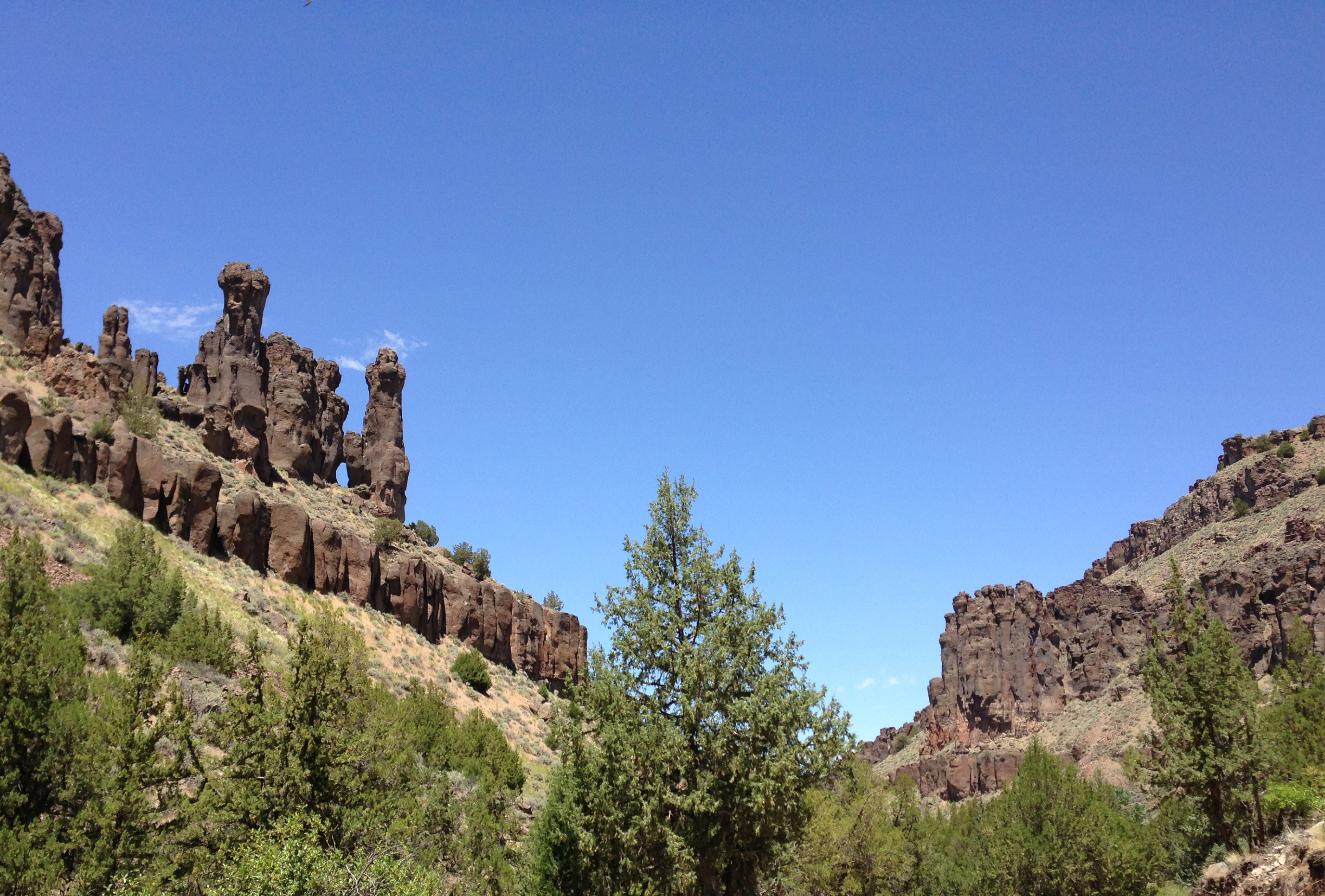
Hoodoos in the Jarbidge River Canyon north of Jarbidge, Nevada

The headwaters of the Jarbidge River are protected as the Jarbidge Wilderness, managed by the Jarbidge Ranger District of the Humboldt–Toiyabe National Forest. The Jarbidge River below the confluence with the East Fork is protected in the new Bruneau–Jarbidge Rivers Wilderness, which was created by the Omnibus Public Land Management Act of 2009 and signed into law on March 30, 2009.

The Jarbidge River is home to a small population of threatened bull trout (Salvelinus confluentus). Bull trout inhabit both forks of the Jarbidge River, as well as several tributaries. This small population is on the southern edge of the species' range, and is isolated from other populations of bull trout in southern Idaho, increasing their sensitivity to changes in habitat. Population densities were estimated at 10–20 fish per km (0.62 mi) in 1996. Columbia River redband trout also inhabit the river. Up until the early 1900s the river had large runs of spawning salmon, with reports of fish up 30 lbs common. Over fishing and dams along the lower Snake River led to salmon's decline in the area.

== See also ==
- List of rivers of Idaho
- List of longest streams of Idaho
- List of rivers of Nevada
- List of National Wild and Scenic Rivers
