= La Madre Mountains Wilderness =

Wilderness area in Nevada, United States

Coordinates: 36°12′46″N 115°27′35″W

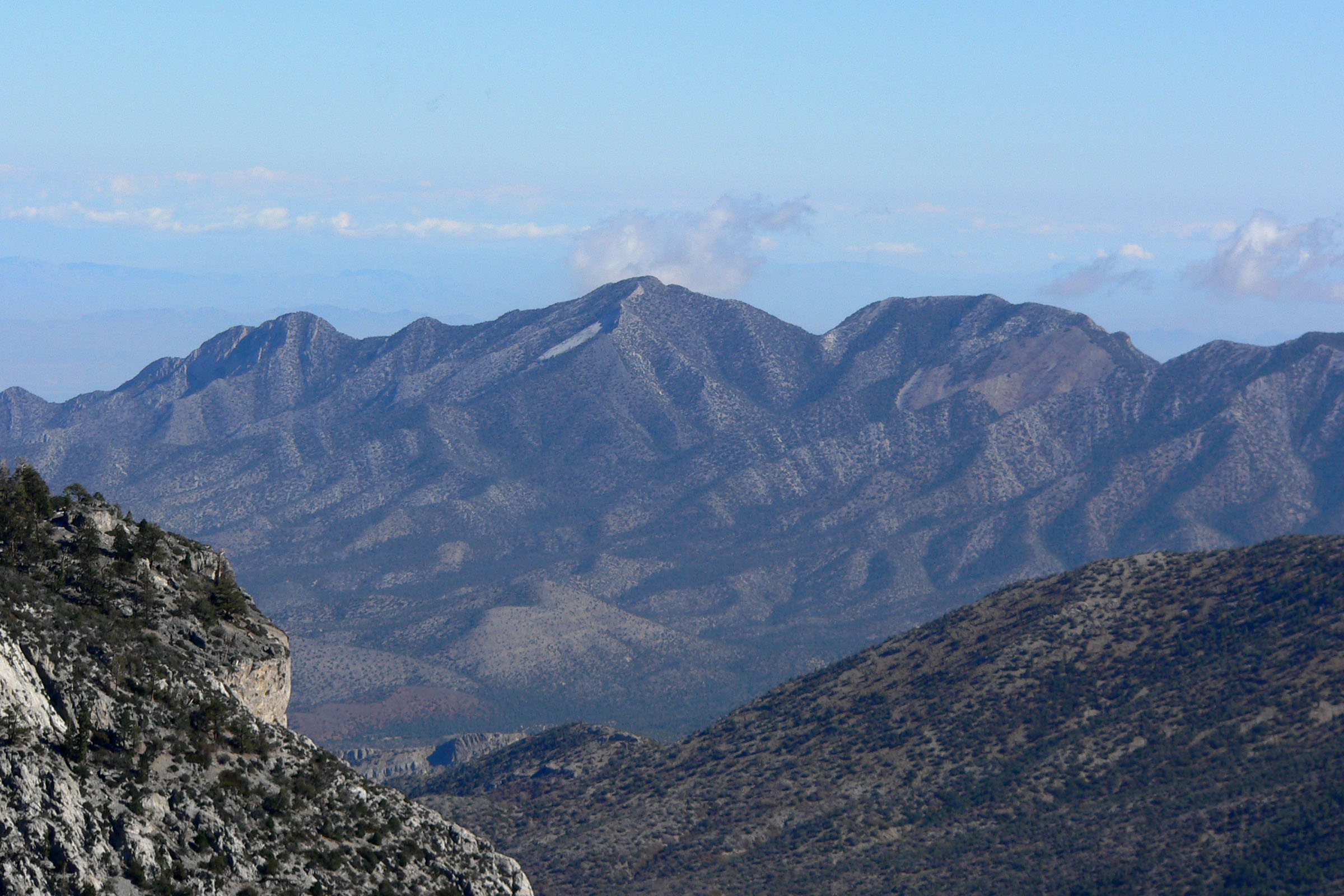
La Madre seen from the northeast

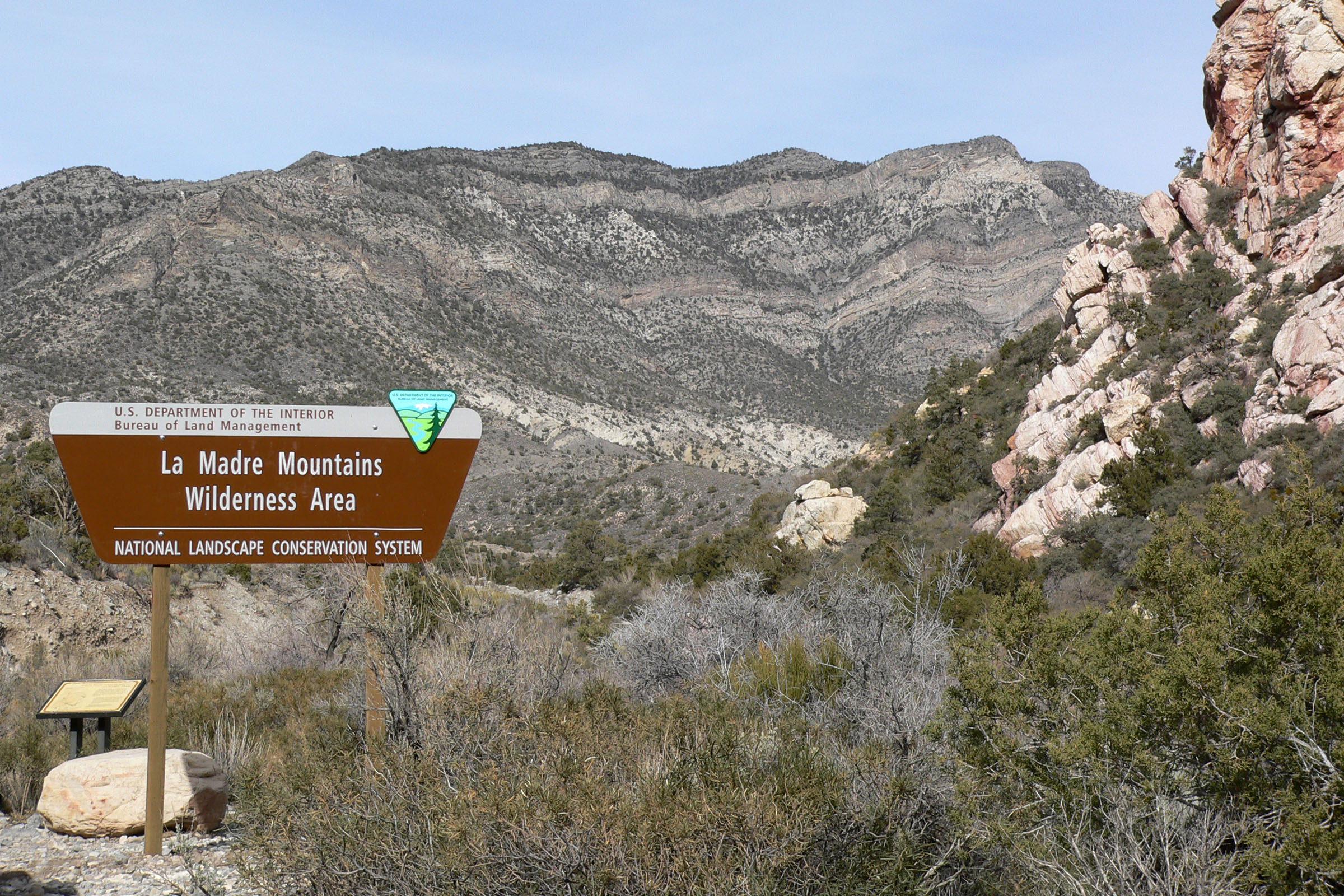
Sign for wilderness area, at road end above Willow Spring

La Madre Mountain Wilderness Area consists of 47,180 acres (19,090 ha) covering a part of Clark County, Nevada, that lies just west of the city of Las Vegas, between that city and Mount Charleston. The area includes La Madre Mountain and several archaeological areas including the Brownstone Canyon Archaeological District. The area is administered by the Humboldt-Toiyabe National Forest and the Bureau of Land Management.

== See also ==
- Nevada Wilderness Areas
- List of wilderness areas in Nevada
