= Monitor National Forest =

Former national forest in Nevada

- IUCN category VI (protected area with sustainable use of natural resources)
- Location: Nevada, United States
- Area: 572,640 acres (231,740 ha)
- Established: April 15, 1907
- Disestablished: July 1, 1908
- Governing body: U.S. Forest Service

Monitor National Forest was established by the U.S. Forest Service in Nevada on April 15, 1907 with 572,640 acres (2,317.4 km^{2}). On July 1, 1908 it was added to Toiyabe National Forest and the name was discontinued.
