= Santa Rosa–Paradise Peak Wilderness =

Wilderness area in Nevada, United States

- IUCN category Ib (wilderness area)
- Location within the United States
- Location: Humboldt County, Nevada, US
- Nearest city: Winnemucca, Nevada
- Coordinates: 41°30′00″N 117°40′00″W
- Governing body: US Forest Service

The Santa Rosa–Paradise Peak Wilderness is a protected wilderness area in the southern part of the Santa Rosa Range in Humboldt County, in northern Nevada in the western United States. It covers an area of approximately 31,000 acres (13,000 ha), and is administered by the Humboldt–Toiyabe National Forest.

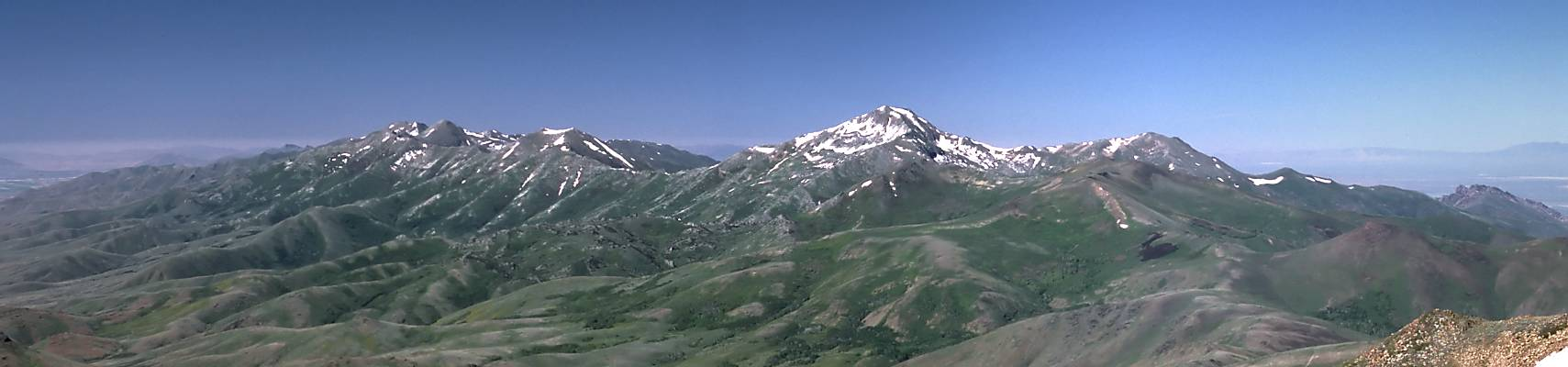
Santa Rosa Range
