= Jarbidge, Nevada =

Unincorporated community in Nevada, US

- Unincorporated community

- Location within the state of Nevada Jarbidge, Nevada (the United States)
- Coordinates: 41°52′28″N 115°25′55″W
- Country: United States
- State: Nevada
- County: Elko
- Established: 1909
- Elevation: 6,339 ft (1,932 m)
- ZIP code: 89826
- Area code: 775
- GNIS feature ID: 860185
- Website

Nevada Historical Marker
- Reference no.: 69

Jarbidge is an unincorporated community in Elko County in the U.S. state of Nevada. Located at the bottom of the Jarbidge River's canyon near the north end of the Jarbidge Mountains, it lies within the Jarbidge ranger district of the Humboldt-Toiyabe National Forest and is near the northwest edge of the Jarbidge Wilderness, approximately 10 miles (16 km) south of the Idaho border.

Although Jarbidge is legally in the Pacific Time Zone, it unofficially observes Mountain Time due to its proximity to Idaho and the Nevada city of West Wendover, the only part of Nevada which legally observes Mountain Time. The rest of Nevada observes Pacific Time.

Jarbidge is popular locally with hunters and campers with many campsites available in the area and high populations of elk.

== History ==
Jarbidge is a name derived from the Shoshone language meaning "devil". Natives believed the nearby hills were haunted.

Gold was discovered near Jarbidge in 1909, making it the site of one of the last gold rushes of the American frontier, and incidentally was the site of the last stagecoach robbery in 1916.

Its population swelled to near 2,000 in 1911; however, it began a slow decline thereafter, when the mining facilities were largely cannibalized for the war effort during World War I. Mining operations ceased completely in 1932. However, in 2013, permits for the removal of the gold were re-issued and the mine is reopening.

Jazz musician Ralph Pena was born in Jarbidge in 1927.

== Geography ==
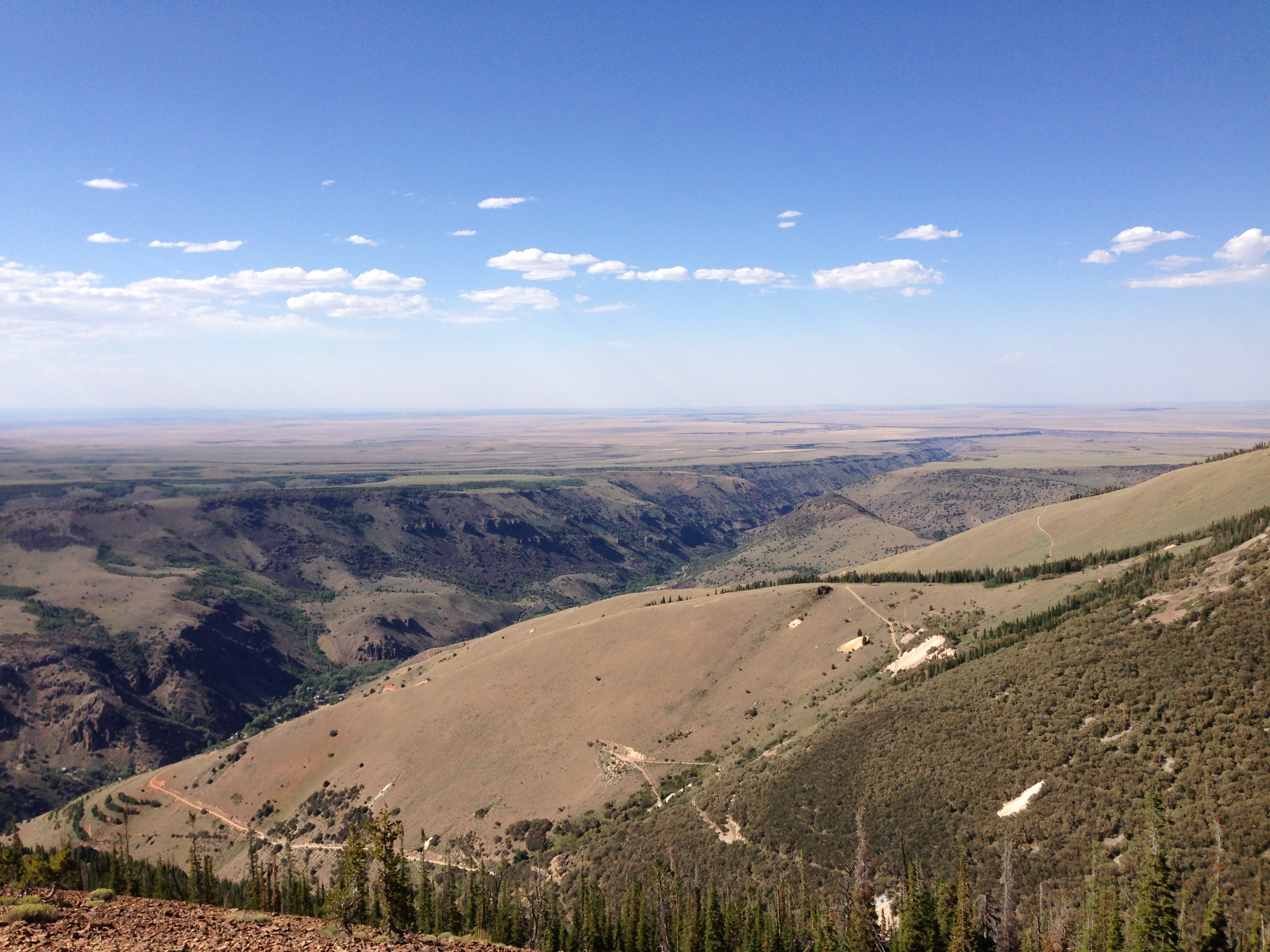
Jarbidge, visible in the lower left of this photo, lies at the bottom of the Jarbidge River Canyon, which stretches 50 miles (80 km) from the Jarbidge Mountains to the Bruneau River in Idaho

Noted locally for its extreme remoteness, no paved roads exist within almost 20 miles (32 km) of Jarbidge. The community is usually and most easily accessed using a motor vehicle by way of Three Creek Road, which originates along U.S. Route 93 in Rogerson, Twin Falls County, Idaho; the final 18 miles (29 km) of this route are unimproved but usually open all year. From Elko, the easiest access is by proceeding 55 miles (89 km) north along Nevada State Route 225, then 27 miles (43 km) east along Elko County Road 746, the North Fork-Charleston Road (signed for Charleston and Jarbidge), and finally 22 miles (35 km) north along Elko County Road 748, the Charleston-Jarbidge Road. The latter two segments of this route are unimproved, at points, present serious road hazards, and receive no winter maintenance. They are often closed from as early as October or November to as late as June or July due to heavy snowfall.

=== Climate ===
According to the Köppen Climate Classification system, Jarbidge has a warm-summer mediterranean continental climate, abbreviated "Dsb" on climate maps. The hottest temperature recorded in Jarbidge was 101 °F (38.3 °C) on July 14, 2002, while the coldest temperature recorded was −38 °F (−38.9 °C) on December 22, 1990.

Climate data for Jarbidge 7 N, Nevada, 1991–2020 normals, 1996-2013 snowfall: 6050ft (1844m)
Month	Jan	Feb	Mar	Apr	May	Jun	Jul	Aug	Sep	Oct	Nov	Dec	Year
Record high °F (°C)	63 (17)	61 (16)	77 (25)	80 (27)	89 (32)	97 (36)	100 (38)	100 (38)	92 (33)	85 (29)	73 (23)	61 (16)	100 (38)
Mean daily maximum °F (°C)	37.6 (3.1)	37.6 (3.1)	44.2 (6.8)	51.1 (10.6)	61.3 (16.3)	71.4 (21.9)	82.4 (28.0)	81.2 (27.3)	71.4 (21.9)	57.6 (14.2)	43.3 (6.3)	35.5 (1.9)	56.2 (13.5)
Daily mean °F (°C)	27.7 (−2.4)	28.0 (−2.2)	33.8 (1.0)	39.1 (3.9)	47.7 (8.7)	55.5 (13.1)	64.9 (18.3)	63.6 (17.6)	54.7 (12.6)	43.5 (6.4)	32.7 (0.4)	25.9 (−3.4)	43.1 (6.2)
Mean daily minimum °F (°C)	17.7 (−7.9)	18.3 (−7.6)	23.3 (−4.8)	27.1 (−2.7)	34.0 (1.1)	39.6 (4.2)	47.5 (8.6)	46.0 (7.8)	38.1 (3.4)	29.4 (−1.4)	22.0 (−5.6)	16.4 (−8.7)	30.0 (−1.1)
Record low °F (°C)	−14 (−26)	−18 (−28)	1 (−17)	7 (−14)	15 (−9)	23 (−5)	28 (−2)	27 (−3)	16 (−9)	−7 (−22)	−6 (−21)	−20 (−29)	−20 (−29)
Average precipitation inches (mm)	1.43 (36)	1.10 (28)	1.87 (47)	2.51 (64)	2.30 (58)	1.40 (36)	0.55 (14)	0.34 (8.6)	0.92 (23)	1.13 (29)	1.49 (38)	1.29 (33)	16.33 (414.6)
Average snowfall inches (cm)	15.2 (39)	13.2 (34)	16.8 (43)	12.8 (33)	3.7 (9.4)	0.4 (1.0)	0.0 (0.0)	0.0 (0.0)	0.8 (2.0)	3.8 (9.7)	9.2 (23)	14.0 (36)	89.9 (230.1)
Source 1: NOAA
Source 2: XMACIS2 (snowfall & records)

Climate data for Jarbidge, Nevada (Gibbs Ranch), 1991–2020 normals, extremes 1953–present
Month	Jan	Feb	Mar	Apr	May	Jun	Jul	Aug	Sep	Oct	Nov	Dec	Year
Record high °F (°C)	60 (16)	66 (19)	75 (24)	83 (28)	90 (32)	95 (35)	101 (38)	99 (37)	96 (36)	87 (31)	72 (22)	59 (15)	101 (38)
Mean maximum °F (°C)	47.3 (8.5)	51.0 (10.6)	62.8 (17.1)	72.9 (22.7)	80.0 (26.7)	88.3 (31.3)	94.4 (34.7)	92.7 (33.7)	87.7 (30.9)	77.8 (25.4)	63.8 (17.7)	50.4 (10.2)	95.1 (35.1)
Mean daily maximum °F (°C)	36.6 (2.6)	39.3 (4.1)	47.7 (8.7)	55.2 (12.9)	64.6 (18.1)	74.6 (23.7)	85.6 (29.8)	84.6 (29.2)	75.7 (24.3)	62.4 (16.9)	47.4 (8.6)	37.3 (2.9)	59.3 (15.2)
Daily mean °F (°C)	26.1 (−3.3)	28.7 (−1.8)	36.7 (2.6)	42.7 (5.9)	50.7 (10.4)	58.7 (14.8)	67.4 (19.7)	65.8 (18.8)	57.4 (14.1)	46.3 (7.9)	35.0 (1.7)	26.5 (−3.1)	45.2 (7.3)
Mean daily minimum °F (°C)	15.6 (−9.1)	18.1 (−7.7)	25.7 (−3.5)	30.2 (−1.0)	36.7 (2.6)	42.8 (6.0)	49.2 (9.6)	47.1 (8.4)	39.2 (4.0)	30.2 (−1.0)	22.5 (−5.3)	15.7 (−9.1)	31.1 (−0.5)
Mean minimum °F (°C)	−2.8 (−19.3)	−0.2 (−17.9)	9.4 (−12.6)	17.9 (−7.8)	21.6 (−5.8)	29.7 (−1.3)	37.1 (2.8)	34.8 (1.6)	25.2 (−3.8)	15.0 (−9.4)	4.2 (−15.4)	−2.4 (−19.1)	−7.2 (−21.8)
Record low °F (°C)	−30 (−34)	−33 (−36)	−16 (−27)	−2 (−19)	7 (−14)	15 (−9)	21 (−6)	19 (−7)	10 (−12)	−3 (−19)	−17 (−27)	−38 (−39)	−38 (−39)
Average precipitation inches (mm)	1.27 (32)	0.76 (19)	1.04 (26)	0.97 (25)	1.72 (44)	0.86 (22)	0.57 (14)	0.47 (12)	0.63 (16)	0.73 (19)	0.91 (23)	1.13 (29)	11.06 (281)
Average snowfall inches (cm)	6.2 (16)	2.7 (6.9)	3.9 (9.9)	2.0 (5.1)	0.3 (0.76)	0.1 (0.25)	0.0 (0.0)	0.0 (0.0)	0.0 (0.0)	0.3 (0.76)	4.2 (11)	8.1 (21)	27.8 (71.67)
Average extreme snow depth inches (cm)	6.5 (17)	4.1 (10)	2.1 (5.3)	1.0 (2.5)	0.1 (0.25)	0.1 (0.25)	0.0 (0.0)	0.0 (0.0)	0.0 (0.0)	0.2 (0.51)	2.3 (5.8)	4.7 (12)	8.9 (23)
Average precipitation days (≥ 0.01 in)	5.2	4.1	4.6	5.3	8.0	4.2	3.9	3.0	2.8	3.5	4.3	5.0	53.9
Average snowy days (≥ 0.1 in)	1.9	1.1	1.6	0.6	0.1	0.0	0.0	0.0	0.0	0.3	1.2	2.4	9.2
Source 1: NOAA
Source 2: National Weather Service
