= Jarbidge Wilderness =

Federally-designated wilderness area in Nevada

- IUCN category Ib (wilderness area)
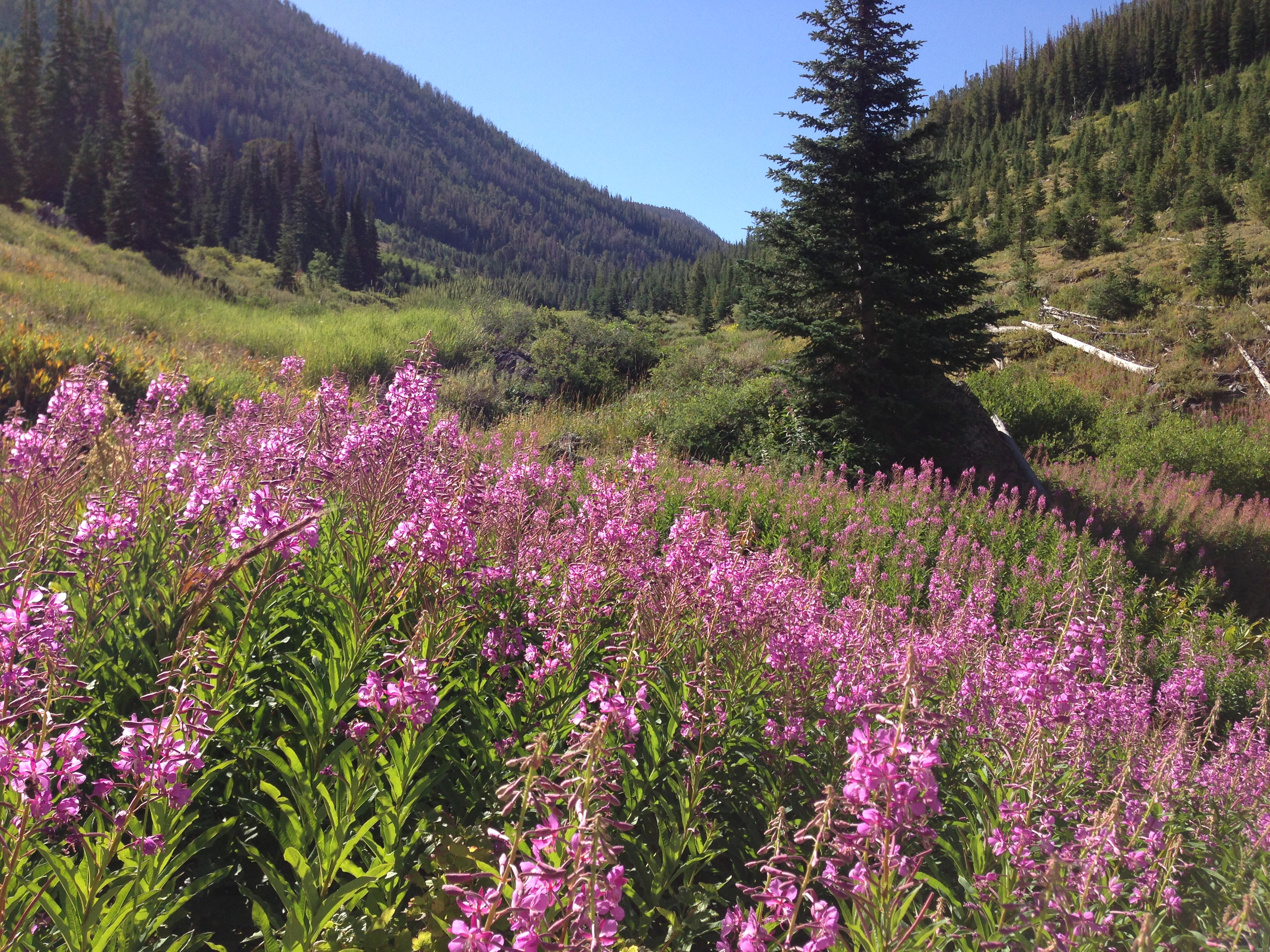
- Wildflowers in the upper Jarbidge River Canyon

- Location within Nevada Location within the United States
- Location: Elko County, Nevada, USA
- Nearest city: Jarbidge, NV
- Coordinates: 41°45′41″N 115°19′13″W
- Area: 113,167 acres (457.97 km^{2})
- Established: January 1, 1964
- Governing body: U.S. Forest Service

The Jarbidge Wilderness is a wilderness area located in the Jarbidge Mountains of northern Elko County in northeastern Nevada, United States. It is contained within the Jarbidge Ranger District of the Humboldt-Toiyabe National Forest.

"Jarbidge" is a name derived from the Shoshone language meaning "devil". Indians believed the hills in the area were haunted.

== Geography ==
The original Jarbidge Wilderness was established by the 1964 Wilderness Act, and was the first wilderness area protected in Nevada. Expanded in 1989 by the Nevada Wilderness Act, this wilderness is now over 113,000 acres (46,000 ha).

The wilderness area contains the headwaters of both the Marys and Jarbidge Rivers, and of Salmon Falls Creek. Emerald and Jarbidge Lakes are also within its boundaries. Nearly ten mountain peaks of greater than 10,000 feet (3,000 m) are located within the wilderness.

Native habitats include Subalpine Fir, Whitebark Pine, and Quaking Aspen forests, riparian woodlands, and sagebrush steppe.

=== Climate ===
Pole Creek Ranger Station is on the northwestern edge of Jarbidge Wilderness.

Climate data for Pole Creek Ranger Station, Nevada, 1991–2020 normals: 8330ft (2539m)
Month	Jan	Feb	Mar	Apr	May	Jun	Jul	Aug	Sep	Oct	Nov	Dec	Year
Mean daily maximum °F (°C)	30.7 (−0.7)	31.4 (−0.3)	37.2 (2.9)	42.5 (5.8)	51.7 (10.9)	61.0 (16.1)	71.0 (21.7)	69.9 (21.1)	60.2 (15.7)	46.8 (8.2)	36.3 (2.4)	29.8 (−1.2)	47.4 (8.6)
Daily mean °F (°C)	24.4 (−4.2)	24.3 (−4.3)	29.0 (−1.7)	33.4 (0.8)	42.0 (5.6)	50.3 (10.2)	59.9 (15.5)	59.1 (15.1)	50.6 (10.3)	38.8 (3.8)	29.6 (−1.3)	23.4 (−4.8)	38.7 (3.8)
Mean daily minimum °F (°C)	18.1 (−7.7)	17.2 (−8.2)	20.7 (−6.3)	24.4 (−4.2)	32.3 (0.2)	39.7 (4.3)	48.9 (9.4)	48.3 (9.1)	41.0 (5.0)	30.8 (−0.7)	22.8 (−5.1)	16.9 (−8.4)	30.1 (−1.0)
Average precipitation inches (mm)	2.08 (53)	1.85 (47)	2.10 (53)	2.62 (67)	2.98 (76)	1.65 (42)	0.91 (23)	0.73 (19)	0.96 (24)	1.41 (36)	1.87 (47)	2.21 (56)	21.37 (543)
Source 1: XMACIS2
Source 2: NOAA (Precipitation)

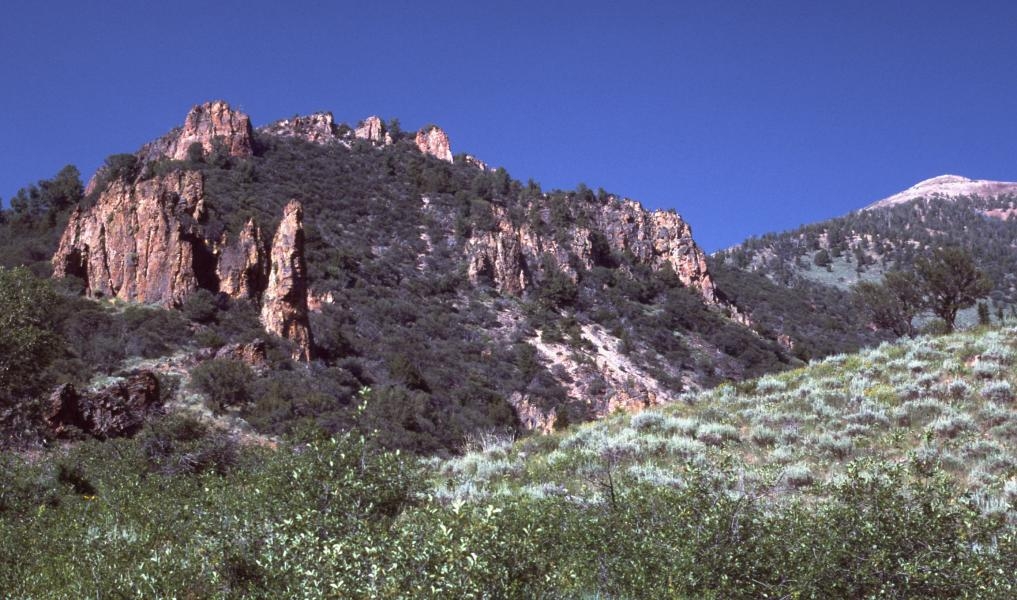
Snowslide Gulch in the Jarbidge Mountains and Jarbidge Wilderness Area.

== See also ==
- Jarbidge, Nevada
- Bruneau – Jarbidge Rivers Wilderness
- List of wilderness areas in Nevada
