= Humboldt–Toiyabe National Forest =

National forest in Nevada and California, United States

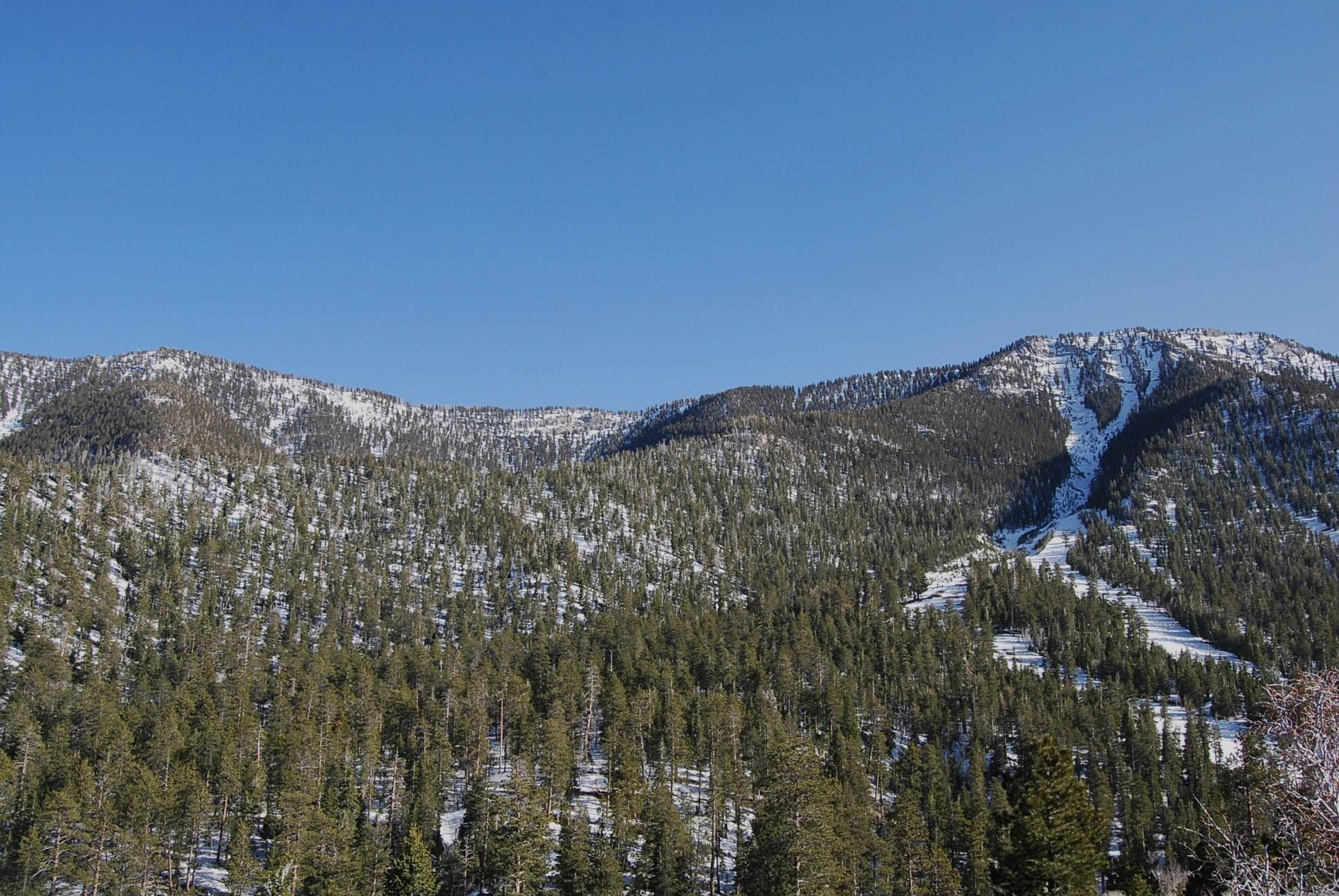
- The Humboldt–Toiyabe National Forest in the Spring Mountains
- Interactive map of Humboldt–Toiyabe National Forest
- Location: California and Nevada, United States
- Coordinates: 39°15′15″N 117°07′40″W
- Area: 6,289,821 acres (25,454.00 km^{2})
- Established: Humboldt: July 1, 1908; 118 years ago Toiyabe: March 2, 1907; 119 years ago
- Visitors: 3,630,000 (in 2017)
- Governing body: U.S. Forest Service
- Website: Humboldt–Toiyabe National Forest

The Humboldt–Toiyabe National Forest (HTNF) is the principal U.S. national forest in the U.S. state of Nevada, and has a smaller portion further west in Eastern California in the state of California. With an area of 6,289,821 acres (25,454.00 km^{2}), it is the largest U.S. national forest reservation outside of Alaska.

== History ==
=== Native Americans and European settlement ===
Between 12 and 13,000 years ago, Native Americans settled in central Nevada, including the area of Toiyabe Crest in Toiyabe National Forest. Populations of Northern and Southern Paiute, Western Shoshone, Washoe, Chemehuevi, and Colorado River Yuman have been confirmed. Native people depended on Pleistocene megafauna and water fowl, which was found in marshy areas between high mountain ranges. They would migrate to higher elevations during the Holocene in permitting summer conditions; abandoned seasonal settlements have been found at up to 12,000 feet (3,700 m) above sea level. Higher elevations of the Toiyabe Range offered hunting opportunities for deer and bighorn sheep. Middle ranges presented similar hunting opportunities and gathering pinyon seeds. Archaeological and cultural evidence suggest Native American populations in Nevada 10,000 years ago. The Western Shoshone, Northern Paiute, and descendent Ancient Puebloans tribes have relied on the land in and around Humboldt National Forest, primarily for hunting and gathering. The Northern Paiutes lived a nomadic lifestyle, residing in higher elevations in summer and lower elevations in winter.

European settlers reached the Great Basin and Sierra Nevada as early as the 17th century. In 1833, fur trapper Benjamin Bonneville established two major trails: one following the Humboldt River throughout Nevada and one over Walker Pass in California that traversed the Sierra Nevada. The latter would eventually become the California Trail, which would bring gold prospectors through the Great Basin. European settlers began permanently settling in the 1840s and, in the ensuing decades, there were several conflicts between settlers and Native Americans. Native populations subsequently dwindled from the conflict and disease, namely smallpox. Once gold mines were depleted, mining attention turned to other parts of the Great Basin. It is estimated there are 80,000 historical or archaeological sights in the forest land.

=== Forest mergers and establishment ===
The lands now part of Humboldt–Toiyabe have been administratively reorganized many times, and include parts of several defunct national forests. Ruby Mountains National Forest was established on May 3, 1906 by Theodore Roosevelt. Independence National Forest was established on November 5 that same year. On March 2, 1907, Toiyabe National Forest was created. On July 1, 1908, Monitor and Toquima National Forests were added, followed by Moapa National Forest on July 15, 1915. In 1932, Toiyabe National Forest was merged into Nevada National Forest; the name was discontinued. Toiyabe National Forest was reestablished in May 1938 from portions of the Humboldt and Nevada reserves. Mono National Forest was divided between Toiyabe and Inyo National Forest in 1945, and Nevada National Forest was split between Humboldt and Toiyabe National Forests on October 1, 1957. The Mount Charleston Division, which was originally part of Nevada National Forest and was transferred to Dixie National Forest in 1916, was re–designated as part of Toiyabe National Forest.

Humboldt and Toiyabe National Forests were administratively joined almost four decades later in 1995 during President Bill Clinton's administration. Although managed since as a single entity, the two forests remain legally and geographically separated.

== Geography ==
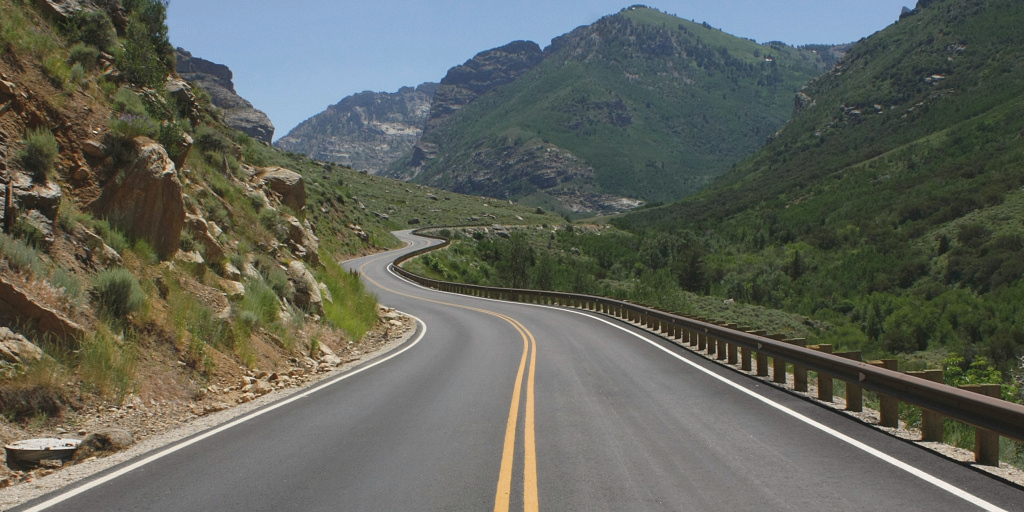
Lamoille Canyon Scenic Byway

HTNF is unlike most other national forests as it contains numerous non–contiguous sections scattered across Nevada and eastern California. Six park ranger district equivalents are located in Nevada and one lies in California. In Nevada, the reservation spans from Mountain City Ranger District is Northern Nevada to the Spring Mountains in Southern Nevada and west from the Lake Tahoe Basin east to Mount Moriah; in California, it lies on the slopes of the eastern Sierra Nevada. The forest is headquartered in Sparks, Nevada.

=== Humboldt National Forest section ===
The smaller and more northeasterly Humboldt National Forest is located in eastern and northern Nevada, in parts of Elko, White Pine, Humboldt, Nye, and Lincoln counties, and contains about 43.5% of the total area. This section of the national forest is named after Alexander von Humboldt (1769–1859), the famous 18th- and 19th-century Prussian / German multi-talented scientist and philosopher. Born, raised, and educated in Europe, Humboldt traveled extensively in the Americas / Western Hemisphere in 1799–1804, exploring and conducting scientific research in various fields. Local ranger district offices are located in four towns: Ely, Elko, Wells, and Winnemucca of Nevada.

=== Toiyabe National Forest section ===
The larger and more southwesterly Toiyabe National Forest is located in central, western, and southern Nevada and eastern California, in parts of Nye, Lander, Mineral, Lyon, Eureka, Washoe, Douglas, and Clark counties, and the state capital of Carson City in the "Battle Born State" of Nevada; as well as in the adjacent "Golden State" with Mono, Alpine, Sierra, Nevada, Lassen, and El Dorado counties in the state of California. Toiyabe is a Native American name. The section contains about 56.5% of the total area. Local ranger district offices are located in the towns / cities of Austin, Bridgeport, Carson City, Las Vegas, and Tonopah. Bridgeport is the only station that is in California.

=== Ranger Districts ===
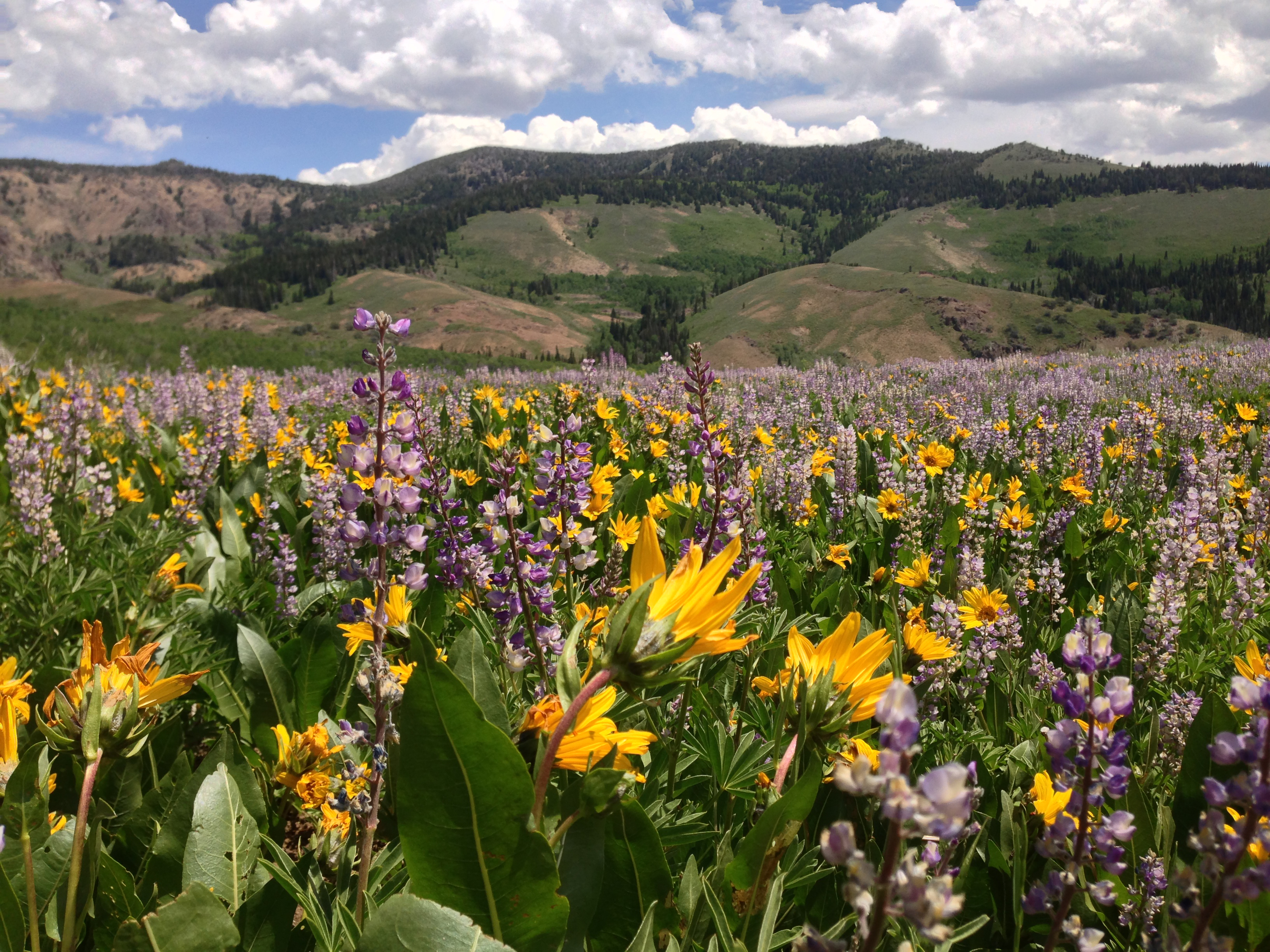
Summer wildflowers in Copper Basin (Jarbidge and Mountain City ranger districts)

- Austin Ranger District – around Austin, including Shoshone Mountains
- Bridgeport Ranger District – around Bridgeport
- Carson Ranger District – near Carson City
- Ely Ranger District – around Ely, Nevada
- Jarbidge Ranger District – near Jarbidge
- Mountain City Ranger District – near Mountain City
- Ruby Mountains Ranger District – Ruby Mountains and East Humboldt Range

(formerly Ruby Mountains National Forest)

- Spring Mountains National Recreation Area – Spring Mountains
- Santa Rosa Ranger District – Santa Rosa Range
- Tonopah Ranger District – near Tonopah, Nevada, including Toiyabe Range, Toquima Range, Monitor Range, and Hot Creek Range

=== Wilderness areas ===
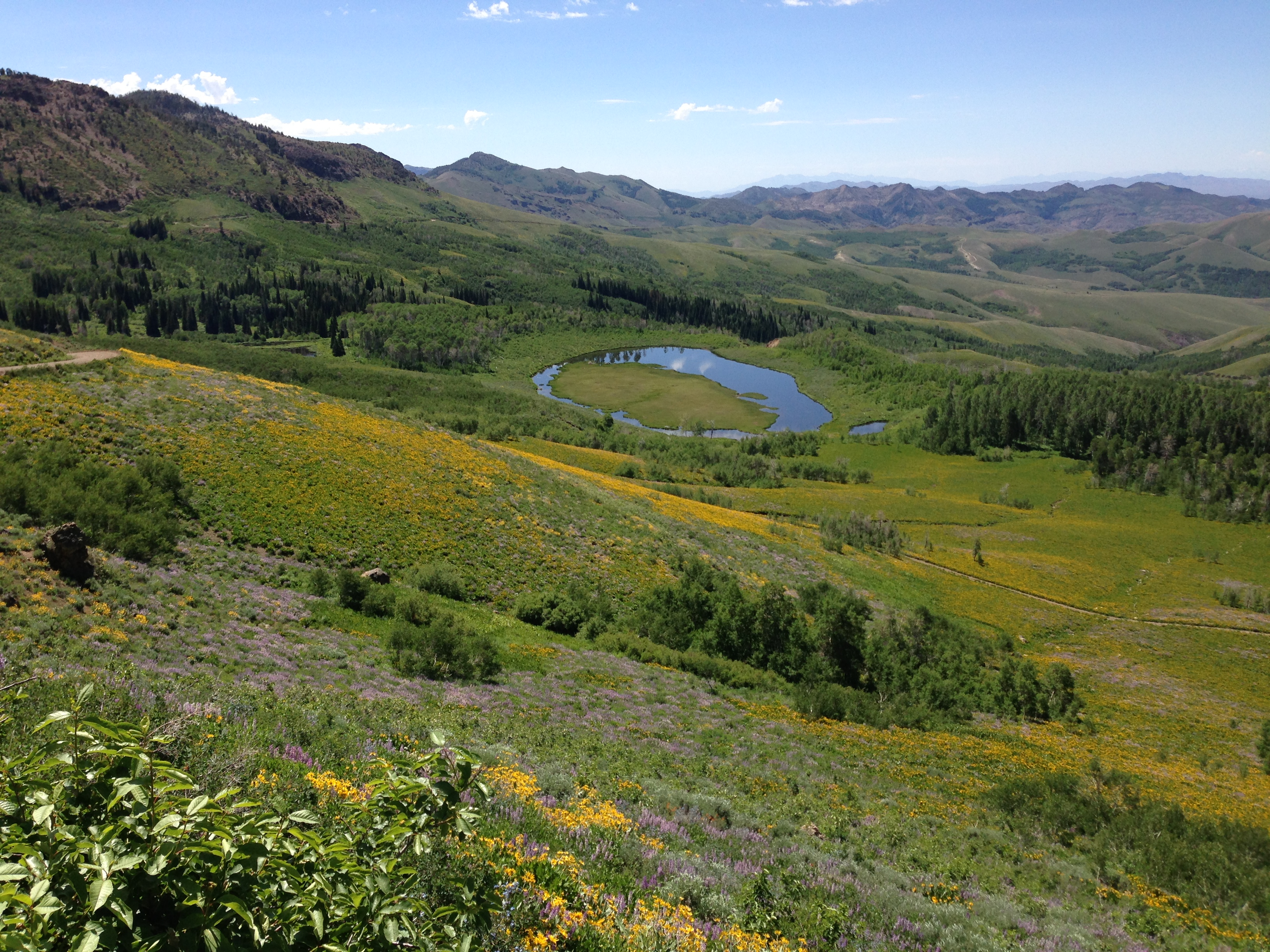
Copper Basin in the Jarbidge Wilderness

- Wovoka Wilderness

==== Humboldt National Forest ====
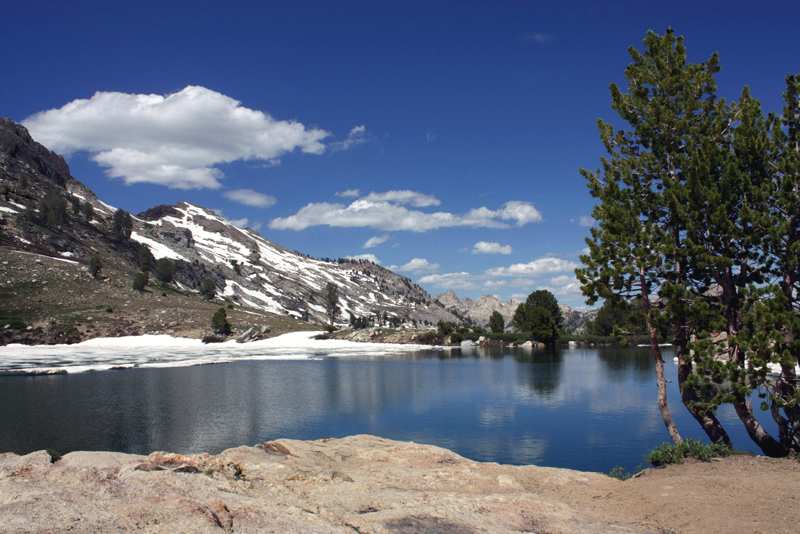
Lamoille Lake in the Ruby Mountains

- Bald Mountain Wilderness
- Currant Mountain Wilderness
- East Humboldt Wilderness
- Grant Range Wilderness
- High Schells Wilderness
- Jarbidge Wilderness
- Mount Moriah Wilderness (partly BLM)
- Quinn Canyon Wilderness
- Red Mountain Wilderness
- Ruby Mountains Wilderness
- Santa Rosa–Paradise Peak Wilderness
- Shellback Wilderness
- White Pine Range Wilderness

==== Toiyabe National Forest ====
- Alta Toquima Wilderness
- Arc Dome Wilderness
- Carson–Iceberg Wilderness (partly in Stanislaus NF)
- Hoover Wilderness (partly in Inyo NF)
- La Madre Mountain Wilderness (mostly BLM)
- Mokelumne Wilderness (mostly in Eldorado NF and partly in Stanislaus NF)
- Mount Charleston Wilderness (partly BLM)
- Mount Rose Wilderness
- Rainbow Mountain Wilderness (mostly BLM)
- Table Mountain Wilderness
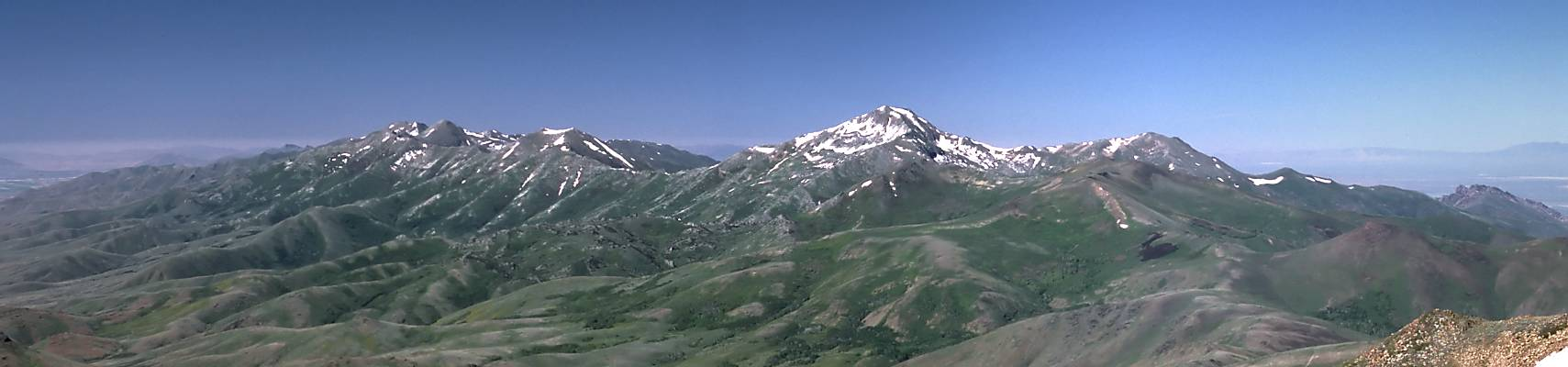
The Santa Rosa Range of the Santa Rosa–Paradise Peak Wilderness

=== Counties ===
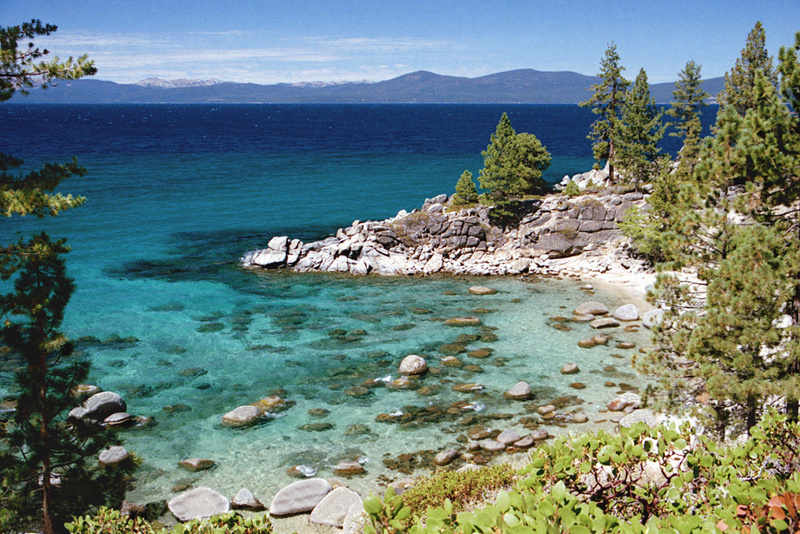
Lake Tahoe's eastern shoreline is within the Carson ranger district.

In descending order of forest land area within the counties:

==== Nevada counties ====
- Nye, Elko, White Pine, Lander, Humboldt, Mineral, Lyon, Eureka, Washoe, Douglas, Clark, Lincoln, Carson City

==== California counties ====
- Mono County, Alpine, Sierra, Nevada, Lassen, El Dorado

== See also ==
- List of national forests of the United States
