= List of mountain ranges of Nevada =

These are the named mountain ranges in Nevada. Some of them are quite small but still constitute distinct biomes.

== A - D ==
- Anchorite Hills
- Antelope Range (Nye County)
- Antelope Range (Pershing County)
- Antelope Range (White Pine County)
- Ararat Hills
- Arrow Canyon Range
- Augusta Mountains
- Badger Mountains
- Bare Mountain (Nevada)
- Barnett Hills
- Battle Mountains
- Belted Range
- Bilk Creek Mountains
- Bird Spring Range
- Black Canyon Range
- Black Mountains (Nevada)
- Black Rock Range
- Bloody Run Hills
- Blow Sand Mountains
- Blue Wing Mountains
- Bodie Mountains
- Bone Mountains
- Bristol Range
- Broken Hills
- Bruneau Range
- Buck Creek Mountains
- Buckskin Range
- Buffalo Hills
- Bullfrog Hills
- Bull Run Mountains (Nevada)
- Bunejug Mountains
- Buried Hills
- Burnt Springs Range
- Butte Mountains
- Cactus Range
- Calico Hills
- Cambridge Hills
- Candelaria Hills
- Carson Range
- Castle Mountains
- Cedar Mountains (Nevada)
- Cedar Range
- Cherry Creek Range
- Chief Range
- Clan Alpine Mountains
- Clover Mountains
- Cocoon Mountains
- Copper Mountains
- Cortez Mountains
- Cucomungo Mountains
- Cuprite Hills
- Curnow Range
- Dead Camel Mountains
- Deep Creek Range
- Delamar Mountains
- Delano Mountains
- Desatoya Mountains
- Desert Creek Mountains
- Desert Hills (Nevada)
- Desert Mountains
- Desert Range
- Devils Hole Hills
- Diabase Hills
- Diamond Mountains
- Division Range
- Dixie Hills
- Dolly Varden Mountains
- Double H Mountains
- Dry Hills
- Dry Lake Range
- Duck Creek Range

== E - H ==
- East Desert Range
- East Gate Range
- East Humboldt Range
- East Mormon Mountains
- East Pahranagat Range
- East Range
- Egan Range
- Elbow Range
- Eldorado Mountains
- Eleana Range
- Elk Mountains (Nevada)
- Elko Hills
- Ely Springs Range
- Eugene Mountains
- Excelsior Mountains
- Fairview Range (Lincoln County)
- Fairview Range (Churchill County)
- Fernley Hills
- Fish Creek Mountains
- Fish Creek Range
- Flowery Range
- Fortification Range
- Fort Sage Mountains
- Fox Creek Range
- Fox Range
- Frenchman Range
- French Mountains
- Gabbs Valley Range
- Gap Mountains
- Garfield Hills
- General Thomas Hills
- Gillis Range
- Golden Gate Range
- Goldfield Hills
- Gold Mountain Range
- Goose Creek Mountains
- Goshute Mountains
- Granite Range (Elko County)
- Granite Range (Washoe County)
- Grant Range
- Grapevine Mountains
- Gray Hills
- Groom Range
- Halfpint Range
- Hannan Range
- Hays Canyon Range
- H D Range
- Highland Range (Clark County)
- Highland Range (Lincoln County)
- High Rock Canyon Hills
- Hiko Range
- Hiller Mountains
- Hog Ranch Mountains
- Home Camp Range
- Horse Range
- Hot Creek Range
- Hot Springs Mountains
- Hot Springs Range
- Humboldt Range
- Hungry Range
- Huntoon Mountains

== I - M ==
- Ichabod Range
- Idaho Canyon Range
- Independence Mountains
- Jackson Mountains
- Jarbidge Mountains
- Johnnie Range
- Jumbled Hills
- Junction House Range
- Kamma Mountains
- Kawich Range
- Kern Mountains
- Kinsley Mountains
- Lahontan Mountains
- Lake Range
- Last Chance Range (Nevada)
- Las Vegas Range
- Leach Range
- Leppy Hills
- Limestone Hills
- Little High Rock Mountains
- Lodi Hills
- Lost Creek Hills
- Louderback Mountains
- Lucy Gray Mountains
- Mahogany Hills
- Mahogany Mountains
- Majuba Mountains
- Mallard Hills
- Martin Creek Mountains
- Marys River Range
- Massacre Range
- Maverick Springs Range
- McCullough Mountains
- Meadow Valley Mountains
- Medicine Range
- Monitor Hills
- Monitor Range
- Montana Mountains
- Monte Cristo Mountains
- Monte Cristo Range (Nevada)
- Montezuma Range
- Mormon Mountains
- Mosquito Mountain
- Mount Irish Range
- Mountain Boy Range
- Muddy Mountains

== N - S ==
- Needle Mountains (Nevada-Utah)
- Needle Range
- Newberry Mountains
- New Pass Range
- New York Mountains
- Nightingale Mountains
- North Muddy Mountains
- North Pahroc Range
- Osgood Mountains
- Pah Rah Range
- Pahranagat Range
- Painted Point Range
- Palmetto Mountains
- Pancake Range
- Papoose Range
- Paradise Range
- Park Range
- Paymaster Ridge
- Peavine Mountain
- Peko Hills
- Pequop Mountains
- Petersen Mountain
- Pilot Mountains
- Pilot Range
- Pine Forest Range
- Pine Grove Hills
- Pine Nut Mountains
- Pinon Range
- Pinto Peak Range
- Pintwater Range
- Pioche Hills
- Piute Range
- Poker Brown Mountains
- Quinn Canyon Range
- Rainey Mountains
- Ranger Mountains
- Rawhide Hills
- Resting Spring Range
- Reveille Range
- River Mountains
- Roberts Mountains
- Royston Hills
- Ruby Mountains
- Sahwave Mountains
- Salmon River Range
- San Antonio Mountains
- Sand Hills (Nevada)
- Sand Range
- Sand Springs Range
- Santa Renia Mountains
- Santa Rosa Range
- Schell Creek Range
- Seaman Range
- Selenite Range
- Sentinel Hills
- Seven Troughs Range
- Sheep Creek Range
- Sheep Range
- Sheephead Mountains
- Shoshone Mountain
- Shoshone Mountains
- Shoshone Range
- Silver Peak Range
- Simpson Park Mountains
- Singatse Range
- Sinkavata Hills
- Skull Mountain
- Slate Ridge
- Slumbering Hills
- Smoke Creek Mountains
- Snake Mountains
- Snake Range
- Snowstorm Mountains
- Sonoma Range
- South Pahroc Range
- South Virgin Mountains
- Specter Range
- Spotted Range
- Spring Mountains
- Spruce Mountain
- Stillwater Range
- Sulphur Spring Range
- Sweetwater Mountains
- Sylvania Mountains

== T - Z ==
- Terraced Hills
- Terril Mountains
- Tikaboo Range
- Timpahute Range
- Toana John Mountains
- Toano Range
- Tobin Range
- Toiyabe Range
- Toquima Range
- Trinity Range
- Truckee Range
- Tule Springs Hills
- Tuscarora Mountains
- Virginia Mountains
- Virginia Range
- Virgin Mountains
- Volcanic Hills (Nevada)
- Wassuk Range
- Weepah Hills
- Wellington Hills
- West Gate Range
- West Humboldt Range
- West Range
- Whistler Range
- White Mountains (California)
- White Pine Range
- White River Range
- White Rock Mountains
- White Throne Mountains
- Wild Horse Range
- Wilson Creek Range
- Windermere Hills
- Wood Hills
- Worthington Mountains
- Yellow Hills
- Yucca Mountain

== See also ==
- Geography section of the Nevada article
- List of mountain ranges of Arizona
- List of mountain ranges of California
- List of mountain ranges of Oregon
- List of mountain ranges of the Lower Colorado River Valley
- List of mountain ranges - Nellis & Wildlife 5 range region
- List of valleys of Nevada
