= Springs Range =

Springs Range may refer to:

- Sand Springs Range, a short mountain range in western Nevada in the United States
- Maverick Springs Range, a mountain range in White Pine County, Nevada
- Ely Springs Range, a mountain range in Lincoln County, Nevada
- Burnt Springs Range, a mountain range in Lincoln County, Nevada
- Hot Springs Range, a mountain range in Humboldt County, Nevada
- Fish Springs Range, the location of the Fish Springs National Wildlife Refuge in Utah
- Box Springs Mountains, a mountain range in north-west Riverside County, California
- Tule Springs Hills, a mountain range in Lincoln County, Nevada
