= Peko (disambiguation) =

Peko may refer to:

- Peko, an ancient Estonian and Finnish god of crops
- Peko (Seto epics) by Anne Vabarna
- Peko (surname)
- Peko, a fictional cartoon dog, namesake of anime film Doraemon: New Nobita's Great Demon—Peko and the Exploration Party of Five
- Peko-chan, a fictional cartoon girl, the mascot of Japanese food brand Fujiya
- Peko, stage name for Japanese singer Eiko Shimamiya

== See also ==
- Peko Hills, a range of hills in Nevada, US
- Mont Péko, a mountain in Ivory Coast
- Peko Mine, a gold mine near Tennant Creek, Australia
