= Desert Hills =

Desert Hills may refer to:

- Desert Hills, Arizona, a census-designated place in Mohave County, Arizona
- Desert Hills, Maricopa County, Arizona, an unincorporated community in Maricopa County, Arizona
- Desert Hills (Nevada), a mountain range in Lincoln County, Nevada

Related names include

- Desert Hills High School, a high school in St. George, Utah
- Desert Mountains, a mountain range in Lyon and Churchill Counties, Nevada
- Desert Range, a mountain range in Clark County, Nevada
