= Fallon Range Training Complex =

- Near Mount Helen, Nevada
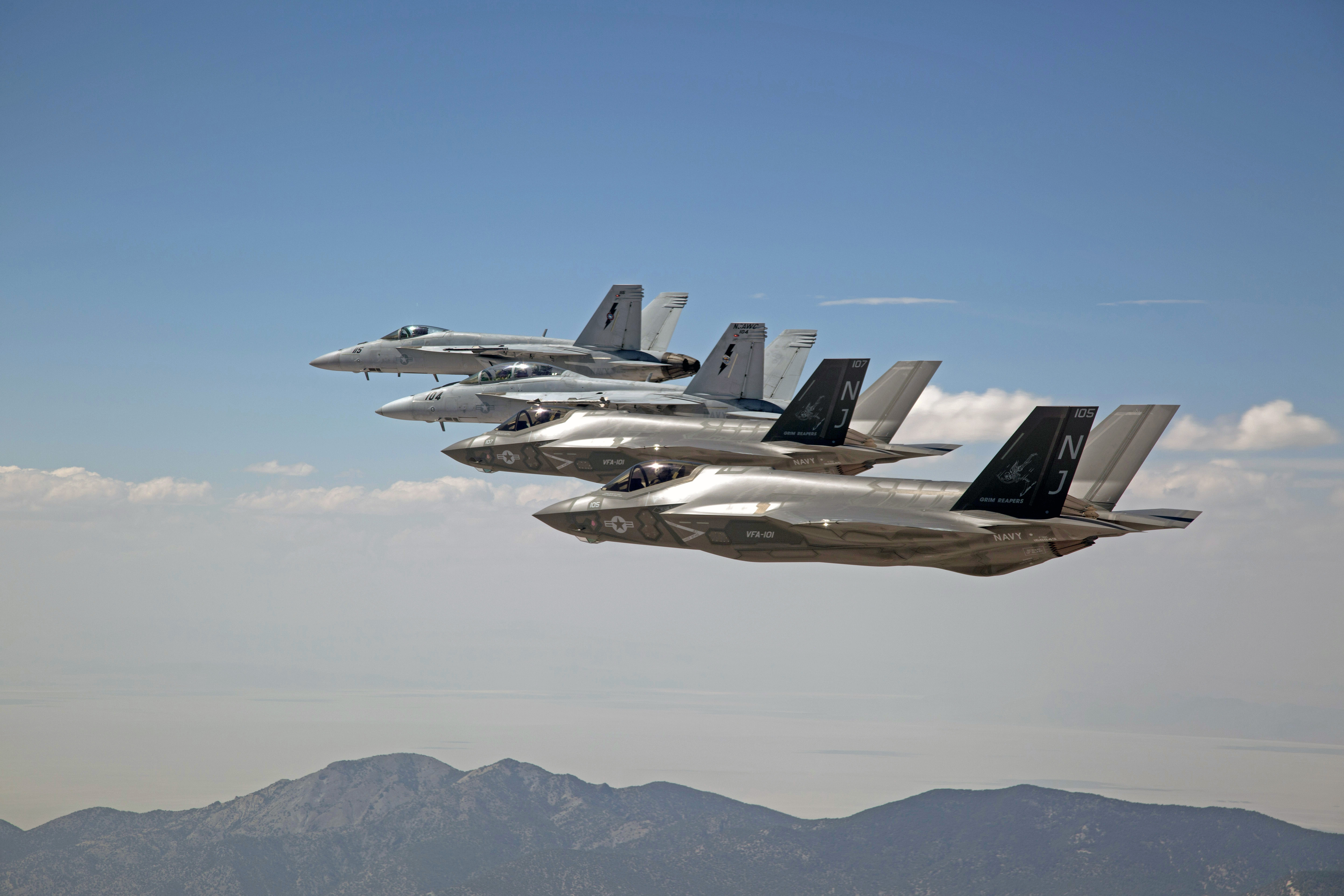
- F-35C Lightning IIs and an F/A-18E/F Super Hornets fly over Naval Air Station Fallon's (NASF) Range Training Complex

Site information
- Open to the public: No

Location
- Coordinates: 37°31′36″N 116°11′53″W

Garrison information
- Occupants: United States Navy

The Fallon Range Training Complex (FRTC) is a United States Navy military area with four separate training ranges [plus] an integrated air defense system consisting of thirty-seven real or simulated radars throughout the Dixie Valley area of Nevada. The entire FRTC is also instrumented with a Tactical Aircrew Combat Training System (TACTS).

Naval Air Station Fallon is the nearby military base supporting the FRTC, and the FRTC comes under the cognizance of the Naval Strike and Air Warfare Center (NSAWC) at Fallon for conducting Carrier Air Wing Training, Advanced Instructor Training, Fleet Replacement Squadron Detachment Training, integrated air-to-air and air-to-ground unit level training, joint exercises, and tactics development.

== Geography ==
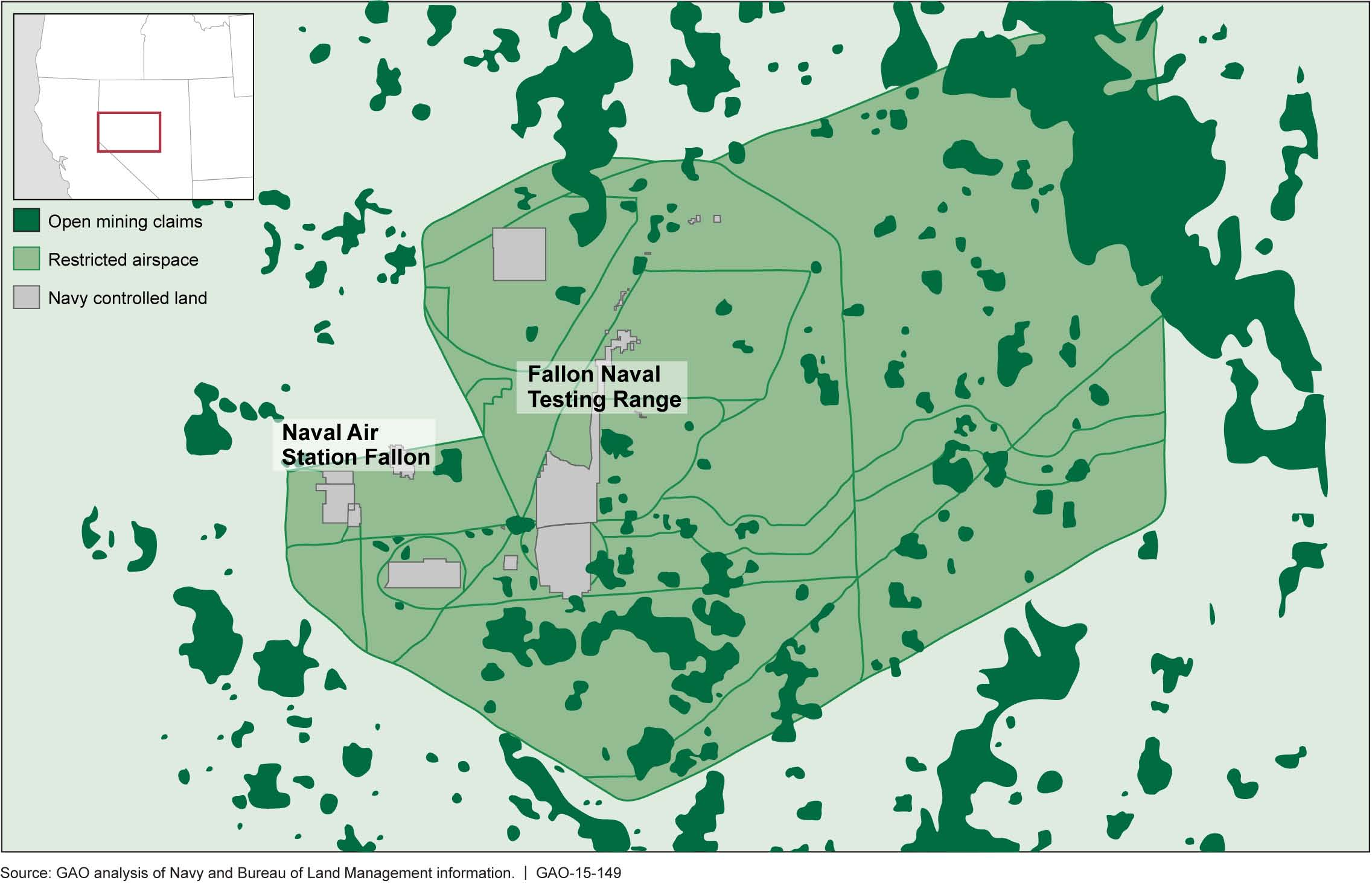
Map of the area

The FRTC is the land area of six (6) target and instrumented areas of 84,000 acres (34,000 ha) used by aircraft operating in airspace which overlays 6,500,000 acres (2,600,000 ha): a Supersonic Operating Area, the Austin MOA/AATCAA (Military Operating Area/Air Traffic Control Assigned Airspace), Gabbs MOA/ATCAA, Ranch MOA, Carson MOA, and Bengus ATCAA. In addition to the ranges, additional land closed to the public "in the event of an off-range ordnance delivery was part of "640 acres east of B-16, 33,400 acres primarily south of B-17, and 6,240 acres (2,530 ha) north and east of B-19", while FRTC federal land open for public use includes "9,760 acres north and southeast of B-16, 5,960 east and west of B-19, 2,765 acres at the Department of Energy Shoal Site, east of B-17, and 68,600 acres north of B-17."

=== Bravo 16 ===
Target Bravo 16 (B-16) is on located in Restricted Area 4803 (R-4803) 9 nmi (17 km; 10 mi) southwest of NAS Fallon between the Red Mountain, Dead Camel Mountains, and Desert Mountains.

=== Bravo 17 ===
Target Bravo 17 (B-17) is located in Restricted Area 4804 (R-4804) 23 nmi (43 km; 26 mi) east-southeast of NAS Fallon between the Sand Spring Mountains and Fairview Peak.

=== Bravo 19 ===
Target Bravo 19 (B-19) is located in Restricted Area 4810 (R-4810) 16 nmi (30 km; 18 mi) south-southeast of NAS Fallon between the Desert Mountains and the Sand Spring Mountains.

=== Bravo 20 ===
Target Bravo 20 (B-20), located in Restricted Area 4802 (R-4802) and Restricted Area 4813 (R-4813), is ~31 nmi (57 km; 36 mi) north-northeast of NAS Fallon "at Lone Rock … in the Carson Sink". The 2 ranges total 41,007 acres (16,595 ha), and B-20 is the only Navy range authorized for use with 2,000 pound laser guided weapons.

=== Fallon Electronic Warfare Range ===
The Electronic Warfare Range is located in Restricted Area 4816 (R-4816) and is 23 nmi (43 km; 26 mi) east of NAS Fallon in the southern Dixie Valley between the Stillwater Mountains and the Clan Alpine Mountains.

== History ==
The Fallon range's "Target Baker (16-21)" was documented in 1957 and in 1958, the "Navy [was] relinquishing the air space and target" for Target B-20 "in favor of CAA requirements for airways". Its 1958 replacement "Target B-21" was to require withdrawal of 4,960 acres (2,010 ha), and a $10.8 million Navy staging base was proposed at "the instrumented AEC range at Tonopah" for 24,000 sorties.

Planning to integrate the range with the Nellis and Hill/Wendover/Dugway ranges to create the Great Basin's "Continental Operations Range" ended in 1975.

The 1986 Military Lands Withdrawal Act (Public Laws 99-606) reserved lands for use by the Secretary of the Navy for "testing and training for aerial bombing, missile firing, tactical maneuvering, and air support. Public "hearings on the B-20 renewal were held in July of 1998"; and its "Final Environmental Impact Statement was endorsed by the Nevada State Director of the Bureau of Land Management in March 1999." The Joint Tactical Combat Training System (JTCTS) was installed at FRTC in 2001.
