= Ragged Top Mountain =

Mountain in the state of Nevada

Coordinates: 40°02′37″N 118°46′40″W

Ragged Top Mountain is a summit located in the Trinity Range in the U.S. state of Nevada. The elevation is 6,316 feet (1,925 m).

Ragged Top Mountain was so named for its jagged peak, which is likened to ruins.

In 1867, Timothy H. O'Sullivan took pictures of the area as part of the Geological Exploration of the Fortieth Parallel.

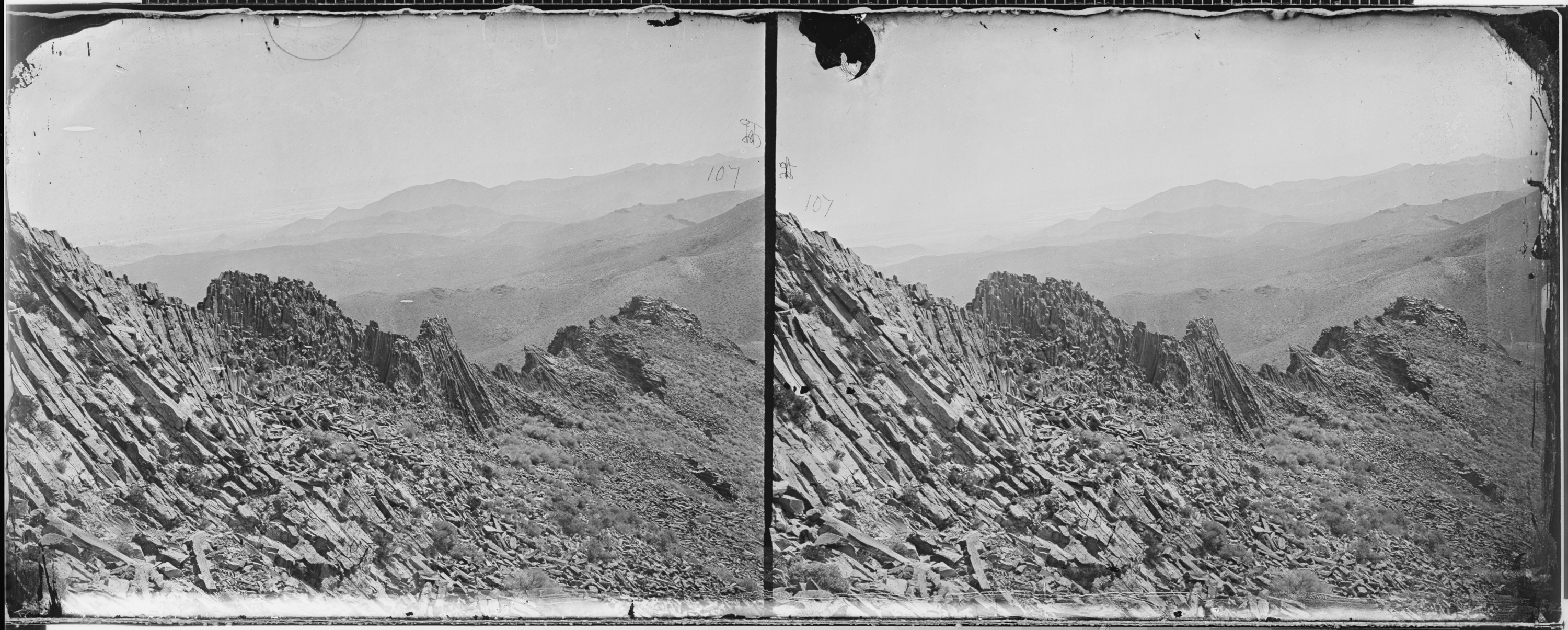
"Karnak, Montezuma Range, Nevada, 1867" (Note that the name of the range is now the Trinity Range, the Montezuma Range is located elsewhere.)
