= Truckee (disambiguation) =

Truckee may refer to:

== People ==
- Truckee (chief), a Northern Paiute leader, father of Chief Winnemucca and grandfather of Sarah Winnemucca

== Places ==
- Truckee, California, a city named after Chief Truckee
- Little Truckee River, flows into Truckee River
- Truckee Meadows, a valley in northern Nevada
- Truckee Range, a mountain range located in western Nevada
- Truckee River, a river in northern California and northern Nevada

== Other uses ==
- The "Truckee" test, part of the Operation Dominic series of nuclear tests
- USS Truckee (AO-147), a U.S. Navy fleet oiler commissioned in 1955 at the Navy Ship Yard in Philadelphia, Pennsylvania and named for the Truckee River; her home port was Norfolk, Virginia
