= San Antonio Mountain =

San Antonio Mountain may refer to:

- San Antonio Mountain (New Mexico) in New Mexico, USA
- San Antonio Mountain (Nevada) in Nevada, USA
- San Antonio Mountain (Texas) in Texas, USA
- San Antonio Mountains in Nevada, USA

== See also ==
- Mount San Antonio in California, USA
