= Gap Mountains =

Mountain range in Nevada, United States

- Location within Nevada

Highest point
- Elevation: 2,150 m (7,050 ft)
- Coordinates: 38°17.97′N 115°3.14′W

Geography
- Country: United States
- State: Nevada
- District: Nye County
- Range coordinates: 38°14′29.833″N 115°4′45.055″W
- Topo map: USGS Timber Mountain Pass NE

The Gap Mountains are a mountain range in eastern Nye County, Nevada. Gap Mountain along with Fox Mountain 7.5 miles (12.1 km) to the south and the hills between overlook the White River valley to the west. Gap Mountain lies just 1.5 mi (2.4 km) southwest of the southern end of the Egan Range of adjacent Lincoln County and appears to be an extension of that range. Fox Mountain lies about 5 miles west of the south end of the Schell Creek Range and 7 mi (11 km) northeast of the north end of the Seaman Range.The Grant Range and small Golden Gate Range lie to the west across the White River Valley.

Nevada State Route 318 lies to the east of Gap and Fox mountains where the White River makes an arcuate bend around the west side of the mountains.

Gap Mountain peak has an elevation of 7,050 ft (2,150 m) and Fox Peak reaches an elevation of 6,896 ft (2,102 m).
