= Mount Irish Range =

Mountain range in Lincoln County, Nevada

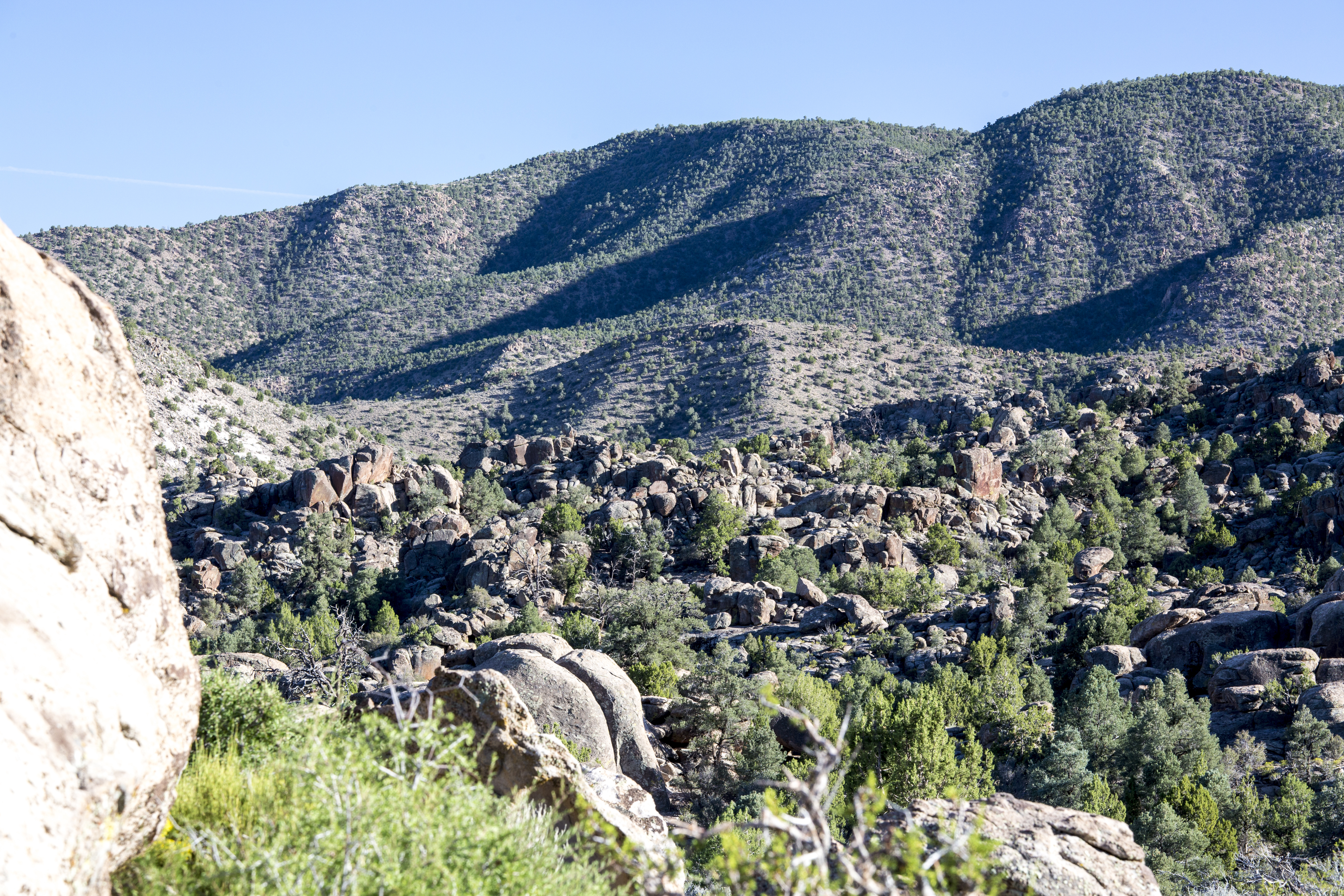

Highest point
- Peak: Mount Irish
- Elevation: 2,665 m (8,743 ft)
- Coordinates: 37°38.70′N 115°24.08′W

Geography
- Location within Nevada
- Country: United States
- State: Nevada
- District: Lincoln County
- Range coordinates: 37°38.70′N 115°24.08′W
- Topo map(s): USGS Timpahute Range, Nevada 30x60 Pahranagat Range, Nevada 30x60

The Mount Irish Range is a mountain range in Lincoln County, Nevada. The range is bounded by the Coal Valley to the north, the Pahranagat Valley to the east, the Tikaboo Valley to the southwest and the Wild Horse Valley to the northwest. Surrounding ranges include the Seaman Range and Hiko Range to the east, the Pahranagat Range and East Pahranagat Range to the south and south east, the Groom Range to the southwest, the Timpahute Range to the west and the Golden Gate Range across Murphy Gap to the northwest.

Silver was mined on the east flank of Mount Irish along Silver Canyon just north of the ghost town of Logan in the 1860s and 1870s. The ghost town of Crystal Springs also populated during this time lies about 7 miles (11 km) to the east at the intersection of US Route 93, Nevada Route 318 and Nevada Route 375. The community of Hiko lies five miles north of Crystal Springs on Route 318. Route 375 crosses the extreme south end of the range at Hancock Summit.

The Mount Irish Wilderness lies to the south of Mount Irish and consists of 28,274 acres of the range. Designated by the U.S. Congress in 2004, the area is managed by the Bureau of Land Management. Elevations range from 4,800 feet (1463 m) to 7,504 feet (2287 m).

The Mount Irish Archaeological District consists of four sites on Logan Canyon Road just to the east of the old Logan townsite and just north of the Mount Irish Wilderness Area boundary.
