= Sahwave Mountains =

Mountain range in Nevada, United States

- Location within Nevada

Highest point
- Peak: Juniper Mountain
- Elevation: 2,278 m (7,474 ft)
- Coordinates: 40°14′5″N 119°4′27″W

Dimensions
- Length: 22 mi (35 km) N_S
- Width: 5 mi (8.0 km) E_W
- Area: 97 mi^{2} (250 km^{2})

Geography
- Country: United States
- State: Nevada
- District: Pershing County
- Range coordinates: 40°10′6″N 119°5′27″W
- Topo map: USGS Kumiva Peak 30x60

The Sahwave Mountains are a mountain range in Pershing County, Nevada. The Sahwaves are a north – south trending range typical of the Basin and Range Province.

The Sahwaves are located in southwest Pershing County with the southernmost foothills extending into Churchill County. The range is approximately 22 miles (35 km) in length with a width of about 5 mi (8.0 km). The highest peak is Juniper Mountain with a peak elevation of 7,474 feet (2,278 m). Surrounding valleys range in elevation from 5,200 feet (1,600 m) in the Sage Spring Valley to the west to 4,430 feet (1,350 m) in the Kumiva Valley to the north to 3,900 feet (1,200 m) in Blue Wing Flat to the east.

Surrounding ranges include the closely associated Nightingales to the west, the Truckees to the southwest, the Trinities to the southeast with Lovelock on the Humboldt River beyond. To the northeast are the Selenite Range and the small Blue Wing Mountains are directly north across the narrow Juniper Pass. Further to the northeast lie the Seven Troughs Range.

Sawhave is a name taken from the Paiute language meaning "common sage".
