= Fairview Range =

Fairview Range may refer to:

- Fairview Range (Churchill County) in Churchill County, Nevada, USA
- Fairview Range (Lincoln County) in Lincoln County, Nevada, USA
