= Highland Mountains (Nevada) =

Mountain range in Nevada, United States

The Highland Mountains or Highland Range in Nevada connect with the Eldorado and Newberry mountains.

== Clark County ==
Highland Range
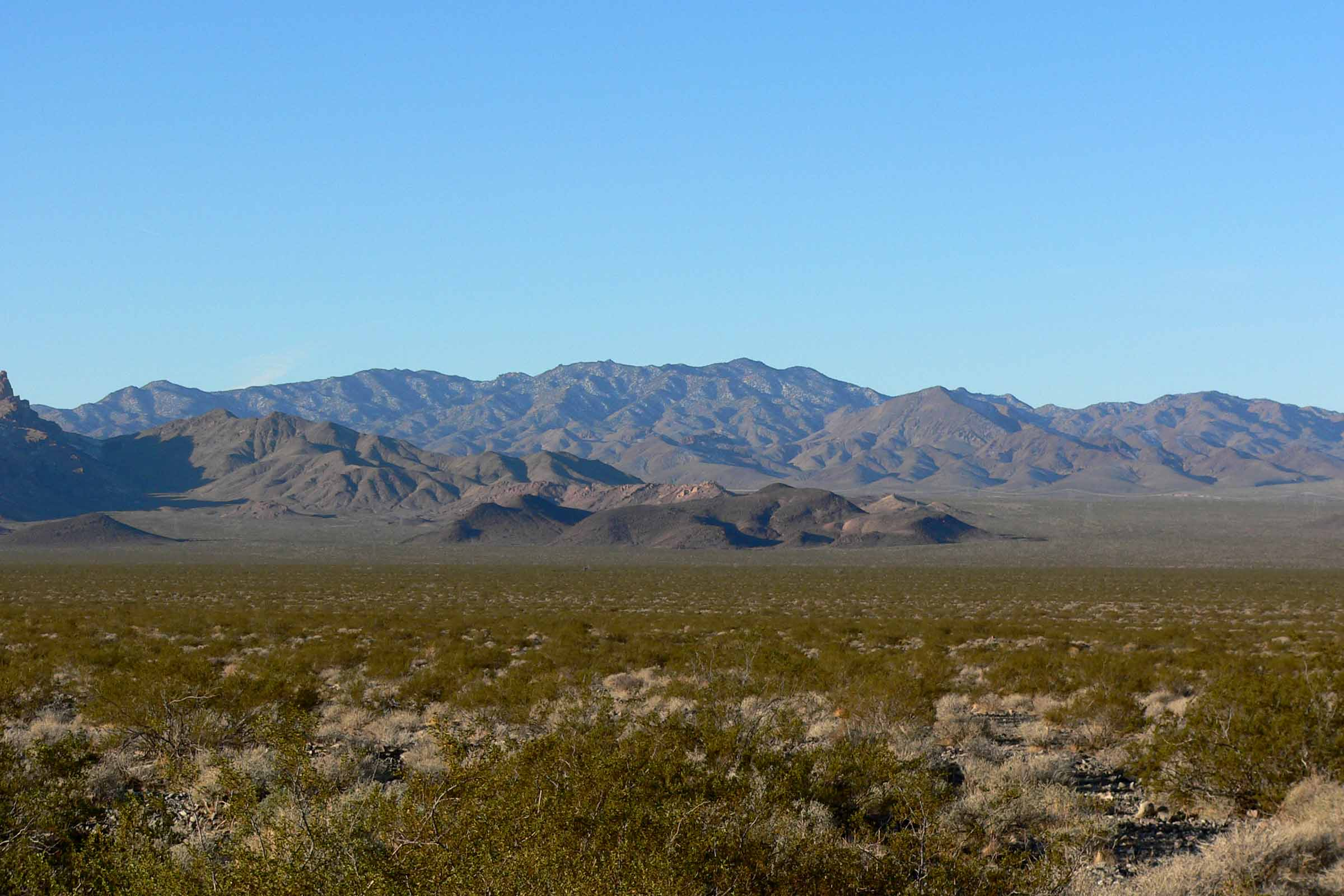
- Highland Range northwest of Eldorado Valley (foreground)

Highest point
- Peak: Castle Peak, Northwest part of range
- Elevation: 4,879 ft (1,487 m)
- Coordinates: 35°38.94′N 115°02.93′W

Dimensions
- Length: 10 mi (16 km) N-S

Geography
- Location within Nevada
- Country: United States
- State: Nevada
- County: Clark County
- Settlement: Searchlight
- Borders on: McCullough Range-W; Eldorado Valley-N, NE & SE; Piute Wash- SW
- Topo map(s): USGS McCullough Mtn., Nevada 15 minute Topo Quad, 1960

The Highland Range of Clark County is a small 10-mile (16 km) long, range south of Henderson, Nevada, and separated from the southeast flank of the McCullough Range by a narrow, approximately three-mile wide valley, at the head of Piute Wash.

The Highland Range also lies on the southwest border region of the endorheic Eldorado Valley. The Highland Range Crucial Bighorn Habitat Area is a large part of the range's north, and also the alluvial plains on the northeast above Eldorado Valley. The Highland Range is about 10 miles long. A north section with a ridgeline extends somewhat into Eldorado Valley; the center and southeast gradually lower in elevation toward the southern margin of Eldorado Valley, just to the northwest of the mining area around Searchlight. The southern end of the Eldorado Mountains, which form the eastern margin of Eldorado Valley, lies just to the northeast of Searchlight.

U.S. Route 95 runs south through Eldorado Valley to the east of the Highlands to Searchlight. Nevada State Route 164 runs west from Searchlight through Paiute Wash.

== Lincoln County ==
Highland Range
- Highland Peak of the Highland Range in Lincoln County in 2026.

Highest point
- Peak: Highland Peak
- Elevation: 9,395 ft (2,864 m)
- Coordinates: 37°53′38″N 114°34′42″W

Geography
- Location within Nevada
- Country: United States
- State: Nevada
- County: Lincoln County
- Topo map: USGS Highland Peak

The Highland Range also runs in Lincoln County. Nearby ranges include the Bristol Range to the north, the West Range to the northwest, the Ely Springs Range to the west, the Black Canyon Range to the southwest, the Chief Range to the south and the Pioche Hills to the east.

Mine workings in the range are associated with the historic Pioche silver mining district.

The range was named after the Scottish Highlands, the ancestral home of a pioneer citizen.
