= Highland Range =

Highland Range may refer to:

- Highland Range (Lincoln County)
- Highland Range (Clark County)

== See also ==
- Highland Mountains
