= Blue Wing Mountains =

Mountain range in Nevada, United States

- Location within Nevada

Highest point
- Peak: Black Mountain (Nevada)
- Elevation: 2,017 m (6,617 ft)
- Coordinates: 40°22′12″N 119°2′8″W

Dimensions
- Length: 11 mi (18 km) NE-SW
- Width: 2.5 mi (4.0 km)
- Area: 17 mi^{2} (44 km^{2})

Geography
- Country: United States
- State: Nevada
- District: Pershing County
- Range coordinates: 40°22′30″N 119°0′0″W
- Topo map: USGS Juniper Pass

The Blue Wing Mountains are a mountain range in west central Pershing County, Nevada.

The range is a small northeast-trending range typical of the Basin and Range Province. Adjacent to the northwest side of the range is a desert playa of the broad Kumiva Valley. To the west beyond the Kumiva Valley lies the Selenite Range. To the southwest lie the Nightingale Mountains, and directly south across the narrow Juniper Pass are the closely associated Sahwave Mountains. To the southeast is the Blue Wing Playa of the broad Granite Springs Valley. Beyond the Granite Springs Valley is the Trinity Range, with Lovelock just beyond. The Seven Troughs Range lies just five miles to the east of the Blue Wings.
