= Matterhorn (Nevada) =

Highest mountain in the Jarbidge Mountains in Nevada

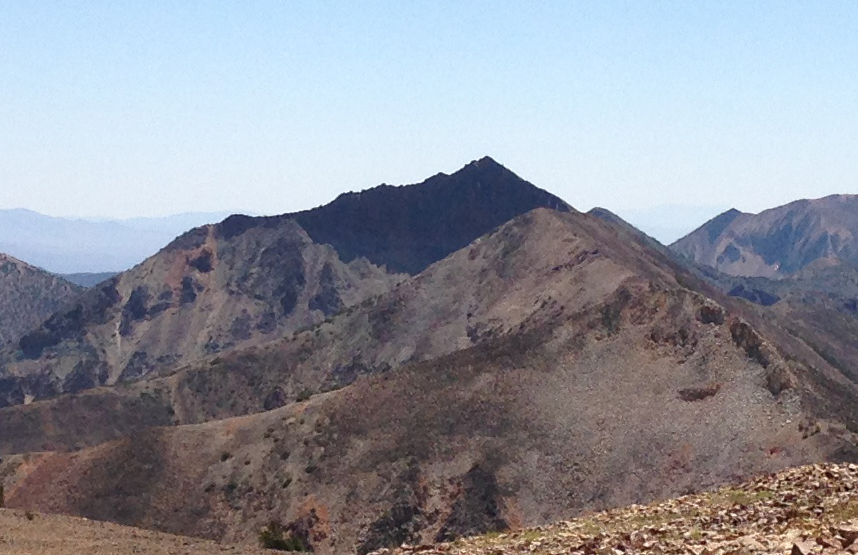
- The Matterhorn viewed from Jarbidge Peak

Highest point
- Elevation: 10,843 ft (3,305 m) NAVD 88
- Prominence: 4,678 ft (1,426 m)
- Coordinates: 41°48′39″N 115°22′31″W

Geography
- Location within Nevada
- Location: Elko County, Nevada, U.S.
- Topo map: USGS Gods Pocket Peak

Climbing
- Easiest route: From the Jarbidge River trail, Class 2 scramble east along one of several side ridges, then south or north along the main ridgeline to the summit

Matterhorn is the highest mountain in the Jarbidge Mountains of northern Elko County, Nevada, United States. It is the fifteenth-most topographically prominent peak in the state. The summit is located in the Jarbidge Wilderness, which is administered by the Jarbidge Ranger District of the Humboldt-Toiyabe National Forest. Its name is derived from the Matterhorn in the Alps of Europe, due mainly to the cliffs located immediately adjacent to the summit on the north and northeast.

== Summit panorama ==
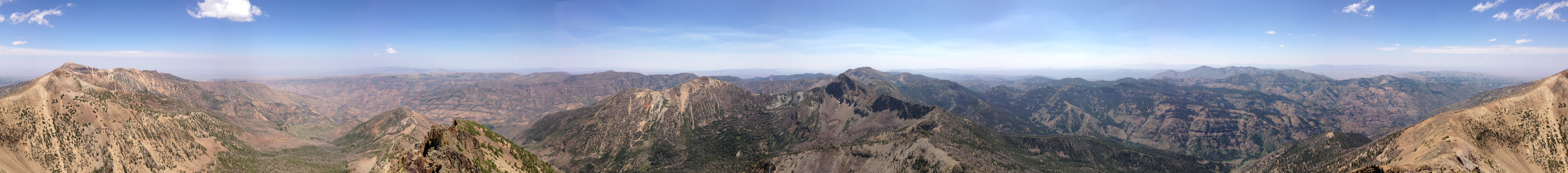
360-degree panorama from the summit of the Matterhorn
