= Huntoon =

Huntoon is a surname. Notable people with the surname include:

- Carolyn Huntoon (born 1940), American scientist and first female Director of the Johnson Space Center
- David H. Huntoon (born 1951), United States Army general
- Louis Doremus Huntoon (1869–1937), American mining engineer
- George William Huntoon IV (born 1992) United States Navy, elevator engineer

== See also ==
- Huntoon Mountains, a mountain range in Mineral County, Nevada, United States
