= Tonja, Estonia =

Village in Estonia

Coordinates: 57°59′N 27°36′E

Tonja
- Village
- Interactive map of Tonja
- Country: Estonia
- County: Võru County
- Parish: Setomaa Parish
- Time zone: UTC+2 (EET)
  - Summer (DST): UTC+3 (EEST)

Tonja is a village in Setomaa Parish, Võru County in southeastern Estonia. Prior to the 2017 administrative reform of local governments, it was located in Värska Parish.

Setu folk singer Anne Vabarna (1877–1964) lived in Tonja village.
