= Mount Irish =

Summit in Nevada

Coordinates: 37°38′39″N 115°24′06″W

Mount Irish is a summit in the Mount Irish Range, in the U.S. state of Nevada. The elevation is 8,625 feet (2,629 m).

Mount Irish has the name of O. H. Irish, an Indian Affairs agent.
