= Võpolsova =

Village in Estonia

Coordinates: 57°59′36″N 27°36′25″E

- Village
- Interactive map of Võpolsova
- Country: Estonia
- County: Võru County
- Parish: Setomaa Parish
- Time zone: UTC+2 (EET)
  - Summer (DST): UTC+3 (EEST)

Võpolsova is a village in Setomaa Parish, Võru County in southeastern Estonia. Prior to the 2017 administrative reform of local governments, it was located in Värska Parish.

Setu folk singer Anne Vabarna (1877–1964) was born in Võpolsova village.
