= Chief Range =

Mountain range in Nevada, United States

- Location within Nevada

Highest point
- Peak: Chief Mountain (South Hiland)
- Elevation: 7,474 ft (2,278 m)
- Coordinates: 37°43′25″N 114°33′26″W

Geography
- Country: United States
- State: Nevada
- District: Lincoln County
- Topo map: USGS Chief Mountain

The Chief Range is a mountain range in Lincoln County, Nevada.

The Chief Range lies northwest of Meadow Valley about 10 miles southwest of Panaca and Cathedral Gorge State Park and about 8 miles north-northwest of Caliente and the Kershaw-Ryan State Park.

The Highland Range lies to the north, the Burnt Springs Range is to the west and the Delamar Mountains are to the south.
