= Logan, Nevada =

- Ghost town
- Location within Nevada Location within the United States
- Coordinates: 37°36′35″N 115°23′34″W
- Country: United States
- State: Nevada
- County: Lincoln
- Elevation: 6,093 ft (1,857 m)

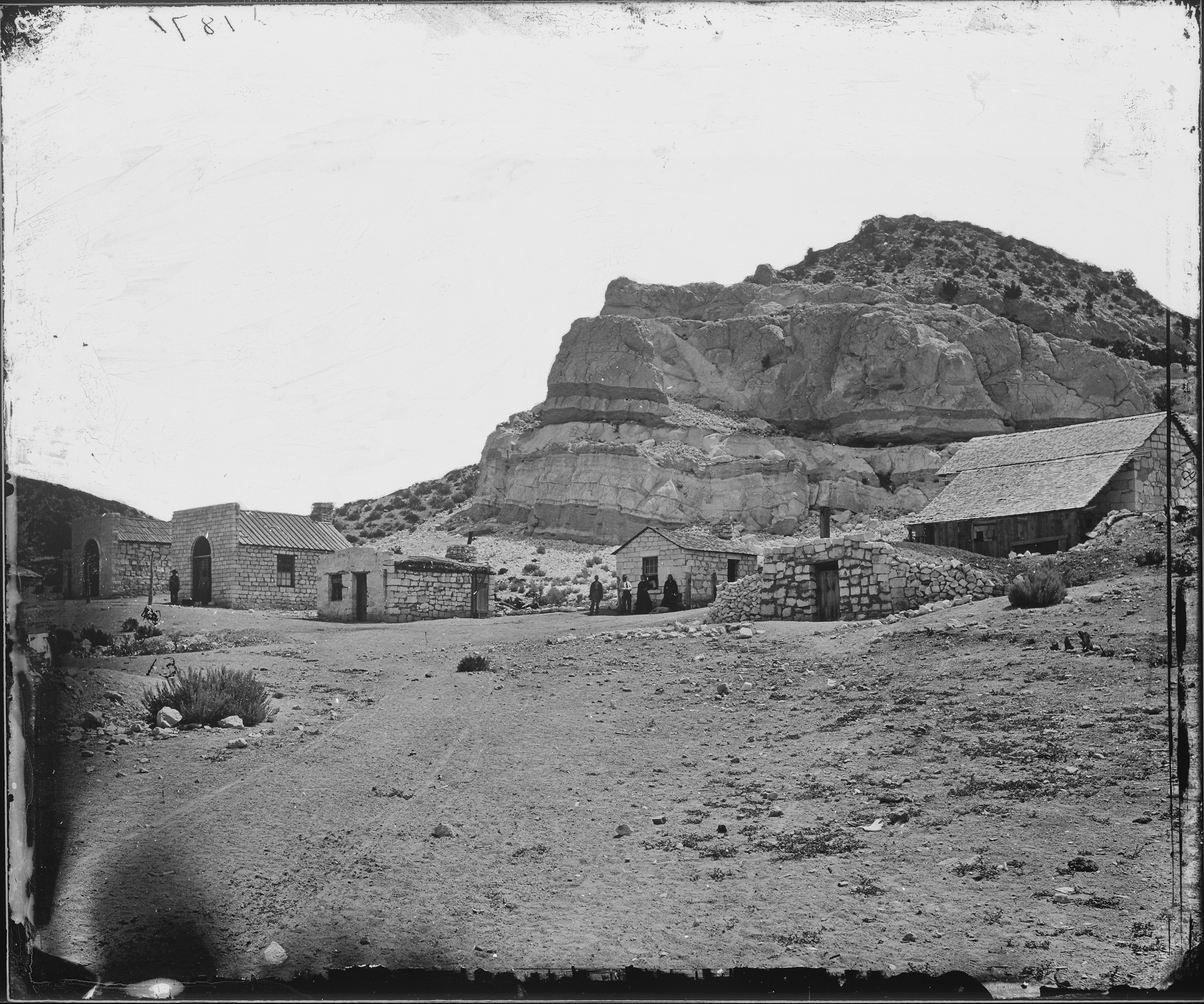
Rhyolite near Logan Springs, 1871

Logan is a ghost town located in the hills about 9.5 mi (15.3 km) west of Hiko and 2.5 mi (4.0 km) south of Mount Irish Peak in Lincoln County, Nevada, United States. Logan had its brief existence as a mining camp when silver ore was discovered in 1865 in the Mount Irish Range just to the north in Silver Canyon on the east flank of Mount Irish.

Variant names include Logan City, Logan Springs, and Logans Springs.

The Logan Springs post office was in operation from July 1868 until August 1871.

A small spring of water called Logan Springs provided an essential resource for survival in such a harsh arid region.
