= Ely Springs Dolomite =

Geologic formation in the southwestern United States

- Stratigraphic range: Ordovician
- Type: Geologic formation
- Underlies: Hidden Valley Dolomite (in California)

Lithology
- Primary: Dolomite

Location
- Region: Mojave Desert in California, Nevada, Utah
- Country: United States

Type section
- Named for: Ely Springs Range

The Ely Springs Dolomite is an Ordovician period geologic formation in the Southwestern United States.

The Dolomite formation is exposed in areas of the northern Mojave Desert in Inyo County, California, southern Nevada including the Ely Springs Range, and southwestern Utah.

== Fossils ==
It preserves fossils dating back to the Ordovician period of the Paleozoic Era.

== See also ==
- Geology of Inyo County, California
- List of fossiliferous stratigraphic units in California
- List of fossiliferous stratigraphic units in Nevada
- List of fossiliferous stratigraphic units in Utah
