= Buck Creek Mountains =

Mountain range in Nevada, United States

- Location within Nevada

Highest point
- Elevation: 2,070 m (6,790 ft)

Geography
- Country: United States
- State(s): Nevada, Idaho
- District(s): Elko County, Nevada; Owyhee County, Idaho
- Range coordinates: 41°55′22.656″N 115°35′6.282″W
- Topo map: USGS Bearpaw Mountain

The Buck Creek Mountains are a mountain range in Elko County, Nevada, United States, that extend slightly north into Owyhee County, Idaho. They are contained within the Mountain City Ranger District of the Humboldt–Toiyabe National Forest. The range is considered to be a sub-range of the Jarbidge Mountains.

== See also ==
- List of mountain ranges in Idaho
- List of mountain ranges of Nevada
