= Alanson W. Nightingill =

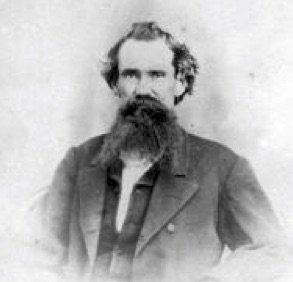

1st Nevada State Controller
- In office December 5, 1864 – January 8, 1867
- Governor: Henry G. Blasdel
- Preceded by: N/A
- Succeeded by: William K. Parkinson

Sheriff of Humboldt County, Nevada
- In office December 10, 1861 – January 1862
- Preceded by: N/A
- Succeeded by: Robert McBeth

Treasurer of Humboldt County
- In office January 1862 – September 1862
- Preceded by: N/A
- Succeeded by: E. E. Comstock

Sheriff of Ormsby County
- In office December 19, 1867 – September 7, 1868
- Preceded by: Timothy G. Smith
- Succeeded by: Thomas J. Edwards

Personal details
- Born: May 17, 1826 Ashland County, Ohio
- Died: February 12, 1870 (aged 43) Carson City, Nevada
- Party: Republican

Alanson "Lance" Walker Nightingill (May 17, 1826 – February 12, 1870) was a county sheriff and the first Nevada State Controller.

== Biography ==
Nightingill was born in 1826 in Ashland County, Ohio. He worked at the painter's trade with his father and brother. In 1849, he moved to California during the California Gold Rush by crossing the Great Plains. He was elected the chief engineer of the Marysville fire department in the 1856. Furthermore, Nightingill was elected marshal of the police department of the city later that year. He held both position and served as marshal until 1857. In May 1858, Nightingill went to the Fraser River to explore and prospect and he returned in autumn of the following year. In May 1860, Nightingill moved from California to Nevada and joined the Washoe Regiment, a militia, that was established in response to the First Battle of Pyramid Lake. He was captain of Company C, that had 38 members and was nicknamed the "Truckee Rangers". His company fought against the Native Americans and then made an expedition through the Black Rock Desert. During the expedition, he discovered Surprise Valley.

Nightingill was appointed the first sheriff of Humboldt County on December 10, 1861, by James W. Nye. His term ended after the elections in January 1862. During that election, Nightingill was elected the first treasurer of Humboldt County. He served as treasurer until the next elections, that were held half a year later. In the next year, Nightingill was elected one of the 39 delegates to the Nevada's first Constitutional Convention, that was held in November and December 1863. Also, he served on the state seal committee. At the convention, Nightingill represented Humboldt County. Records from the Convention stated that Nightingill lived in Unionville, was a sign painter and was unmarried. Although the convention had produced a constitution, it was rejected by an election in January 1864.

After Nevada became a state, Nightingill served between 1864 and 1867 as the first State Controller of Nevada. As a Republican, he defeated his opponent, Democrat J.P. Gallagher, in the November 1864 elections. Nightingill received a total of 9,842 votes (60%). His salary was set by the Nevada Constitution at $3,600 per year. During his term, he got a lung inflammation and he suffered from lung problems since. Almost a year after his term ended, Nightingill was appointed sheriff of Ormsby County by the County Commission on December 19, 1867. His predecessor, Timothy G. Smith, died two days before Nightingill was appointed. Nightingill resigned in September of the following year due to health problems. In 1870, he died in Carson City of tuberculosis at the age of 43. Nightingill was buried in Marysville. When he died, he had been married for some time.

The Nightingale Mountains were named after Nightingill.
