= H D Range =

Mountain range in Elko County, Nevada, United States

- Location within Nevada

Highest point
- Elevation: 2,015 m (6,611 ft)

Geography
- Country: United States
- State: Nevada
- District: Elko County
- Range coordinates: 41°37′1.700″N 114°35′10.115″W
- Topo map: USGS Knoll Mountain SE

The H D Range is a mountain range in northeastern Elko County, Nevada.

== See also ==
- List of mountain ranges of Nevada
