= Jane Vabarna =

Estonian cultural activist and singer

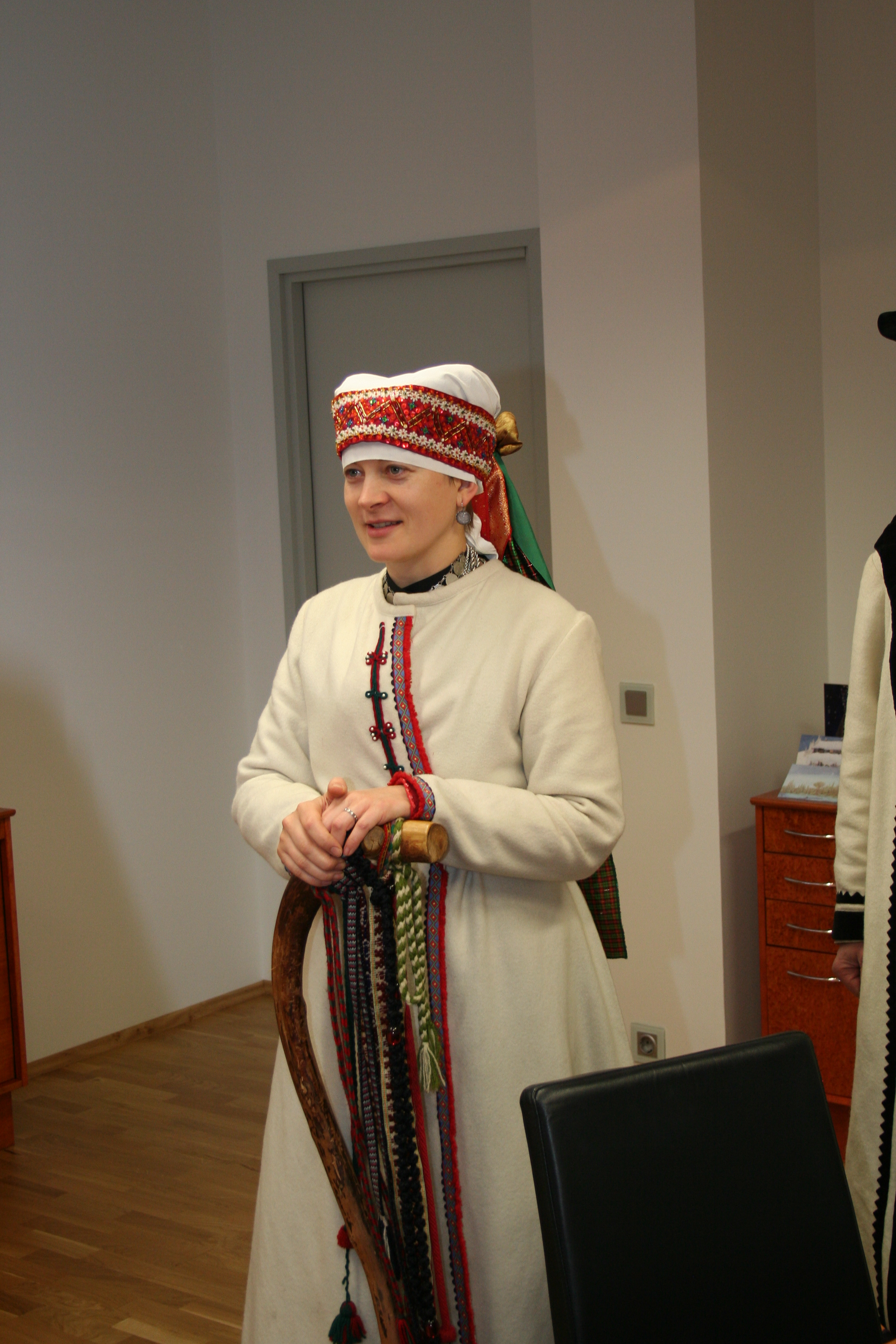
- Vabarna in 2015
- Born: 23 June 1980 (age 46)
- Occupations: Cultural activist, singer
- Relatives: Anne Vabarna (Great-grandmother)
- Musical career
- Instrument: Vocals

Jane Vabarna (born 23 June 1980) is an Estonian cultural figure, craftswoman and singer. A promoter of Seto culture, from 2015 to 2016 and again in 2021 to 2022, she served as viceroy of the Setos.

== Biography ==
Vabarna studied at the gymnasium in the village of Värska. Her younger brother is musician Jalmar Vabarna. In 2003, she graduated with a degree in home economics from the Faculty of Agronomy of the Estonian University of Life Sciences. She studied as a teacher of handicrafts, and a few years later, in textiles at Räpina School of Horticulture. She also gained knowledge and skills in the field of needlework at courses of the Seto Handicraft Society (Seto Käsitüü Kogu) and became one of its craftswomen-teachers.

She works as the artistic director of the Setomaa Cultural Center, sings in the Seto choir Verska Naase, participates in organizing various Seto cultural events, and is the leader of the Seto Lace Club (Seto Pitsi Klubi). Among those who played an important role in her life, Jane first of all names her mother, who from childhood taught her Seto songs and dances, as well as everything that relates to Seto culture. Vabarna's influencers have been local elderly Seto women, the first of whom she remembers is Anni Kuremäe, who always helps with questions of the Seto language and is well versed in local customs. Even during her reign as the Setu Viceroy, Vabarna sought Anni's advice. Vabarna also calls Anne Kõivo her authority, whose cordiality in communication and good knowledge of Seto customs are an example for her.

In 2004, during Seto Kingdom Day, Vabarna was awarded "bread baker and pie maker".

In 2008, she appeared in the biographical Estonian feature film Taarka, about folk singer Hilana Taarka. In 2011, she also appeared in the documentary film "Songs of the Ancient Sea" by German filmmaker Ulrike Koch.

In 2009, based on the recording of the traditional Seto wedding of Jane Vabarna and folk musician Kristjan Priks, folklorist Aado Lintrop and senior researcher at the Estonian Museum of Literature Janika Oras created the documentary film "Seto saaja" 2009”. Vabarna herself initiated the filming of this film and was one of the authors of its script. On 1 August 2015, at the Seto Kingdom Day held in the village of Obinitsa, Vabarna was elected Viceroy of the Setos. In an interview after the election, she said that her mission was to preserve Seto culture and promised to continue to develop the Seto children's school, founded by University of Tartu teacher Annela Laaneots, both in Setomaa and throughout Estonia.

Vaberna is a member of the Peko Orienteering Club (Värska).

== Discography ==
- Laanõtsirk (leelokoor). Õgal tsirgul uma laul = Every bird has its song / latsi leelokuur "Laanõtsirk"; laulõ opas Vabarna Maret. — Eesti: Värska Kultuurikeskus, 2007.
- Verska Naase' (koor). Tsõõri, tsõõrigo' sõsarõ' / [esitab] Verska Naase'. — Eesti: Verska Naase', 2012.

== Personal life ==
Vabarna is the great-granddaughter of Seto singer Anne Vabarna (1877-1964). Vabarna herself has a daughter.
