= Lodi Hills =

Mountain range in Nevada, United States

- Location within Nevada

Highest point
- Elevation: 1,974 m (6,476 ft)

Geography
- Country: United States
- State: Nevada
- District: Nye County
- Range coordinates: 38°59′52.731″N 117°54′48.417″W
- Topo map: USGS Downeyville

The Lodi Hills are a mountain range in northwest Nye County, Nevada. The range lies just west of the north end of the Paradise Range and Nevada State Route 361 passes the west side of the range.
