= Halfpint Range =

Mountain range in Nevada, United States

- Location within Nevada

Highest point
- Peak: Cockeyed Ridge
- Elevation: 1,925 m (6,316 ft)
- Coordinates: 37°08′54″N 115°55′47″W

Dimensions
- Length: 22 mi (35 km) N-S
- Width: 5 mi (8.0 km) E-W

Geography
- Country: United States
- State: Nevada
- District: Nye County
- Range coordinates: 37°3′N 115°56′W
- Topo map(s): USGS Jangle Ridge, Aysees Peak, Plutonium Valley, Oak Spring 7.5 minute quads

The Halfpint Range is a low arcuate mountain range in eastern Nye County and extending into southwest Lincoln County, Nevada. The western portion of the range lies within the Nevada Test Site. Yucca Flat and Plutonium Valley lie to west and Frenchman Flat to the south. The Buried Hills, the Papoose Range and Papoose Lake lie to the east. French Peak (5,280 ft (1,610 m)) is at the south end and Banded Mountain (5,336 ft (1,626 m)) lies at the north end of the range.
