= Weepah Spring Wilderness =

Wilderness area in Nevada, United States

- IUCN category Ib (wilderness area)
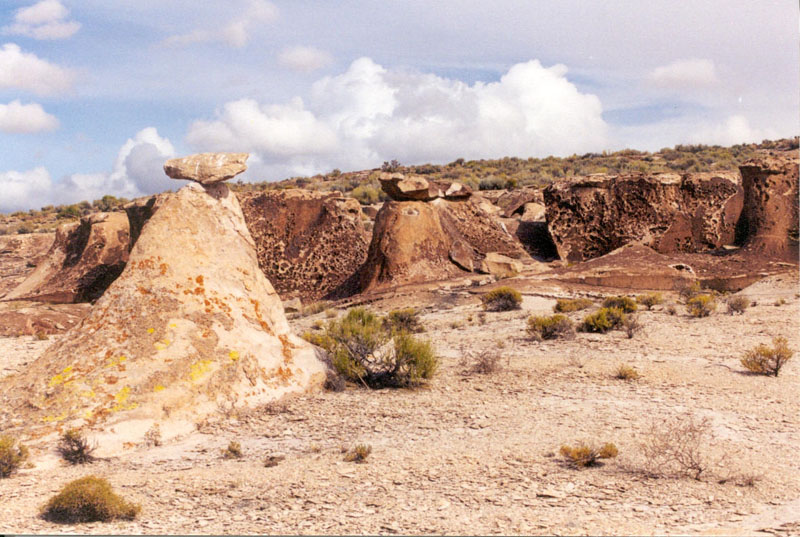
- Interactive map of Weepah Spring Wilderness
- Location: Lincoln / Nye counties, Nevada USA
- Nearest city: Hiko, Nevada
- Coordinates: 38°00′06″N 115°05′09″W
- Area: 51,480 acres (208.3 km^{2})
- Established: 2004
- Governing body: U.S. Bureau of Land Management

Weepah Spring Wilderness is a 51,480-acre (20,830 ha) wilderness area in Lincoln and Nye Counties, in the U.S. state of Nevada. The Wilderness lies approximately 35 miles (56 km) north of the town of Alamo and is administered by the U.S. Bureau of Land Management.

Weepah Spring Wilderness contains Timber Mountain and lies within the Seaman Range, an excellent example of a Great Basin mountain range. It lacks a single defined ridgeline and contains isolated peaks, maze-like canyons, walls of fossil bearing rocks, natural arches, and volcanic hoodoos. The Wilderness also has the largest stand of ponderosa pine in eastern Nevada and 4,000-year-old rock art.

== Archeology ==
Within the Weepah Springs Wilderness is the White River Narrows Archaeological District, listed on the National Register of Historic Places. The district encompasses one of the largest and most well-known concentrations of petroglyphs in Nevada. Other prehistoric sites in the District include shelter caves, hunting blinds, and campsites.

== See also ==
- List of wilderness areas in Nevada
- List of U.S. Wilderness Areas
- Wilderness Act
