= Snowstorm Mountains =

Mountain range in Nevada, United States

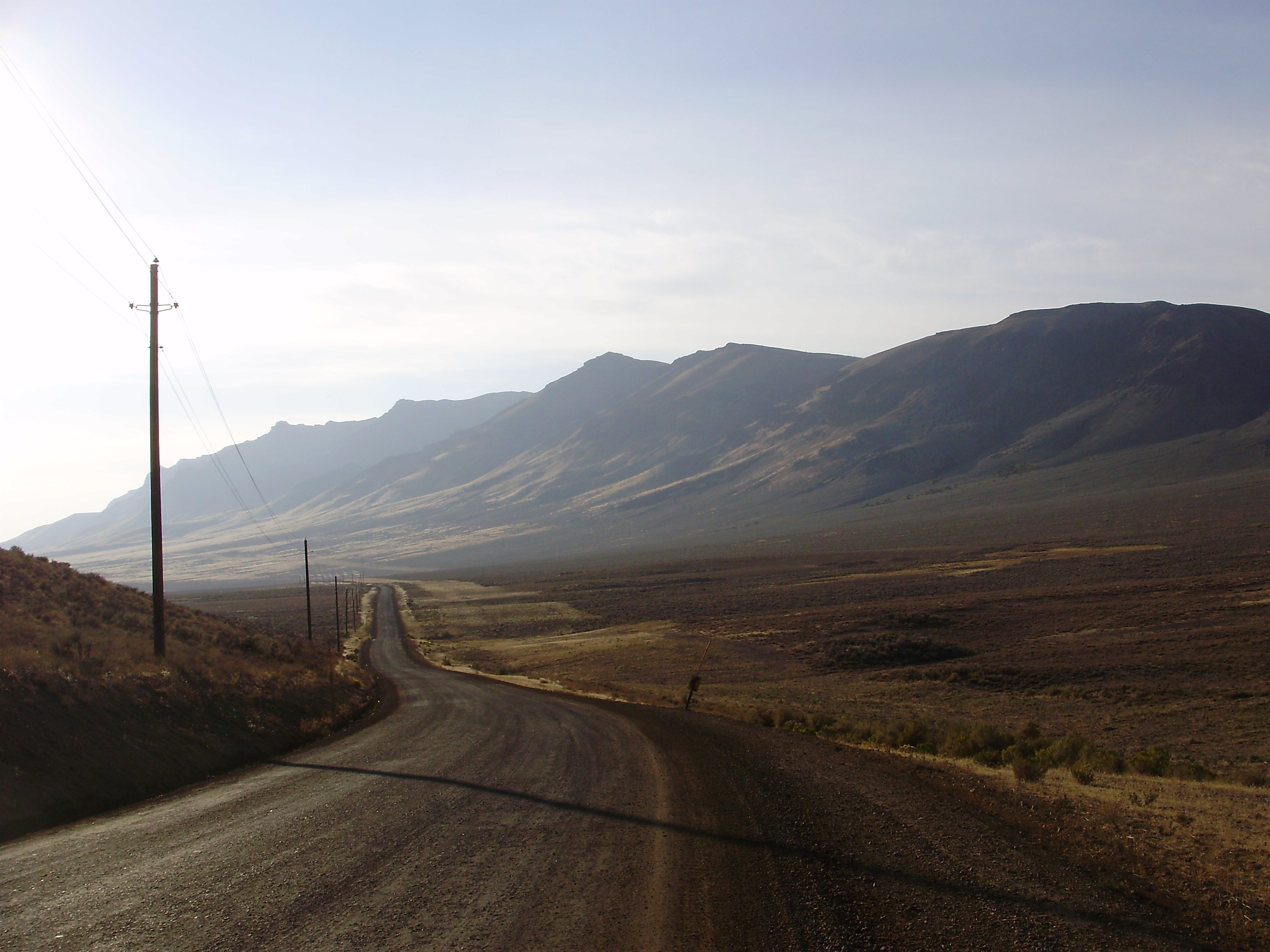
- View of the Snowstorm Mountains from Midas Road, September 2012

Highest point
- Peak: Kelly Creek Mountain
- Elevation: 2,561 m (8,402 ft)

Geography
- Location within Nevada
- Country: United States
- State: Nevada
- District: Elko County
- Range coordinates: 41°18′0.645″N 116°56′19.400″W
- Topo map: USGS Snowstorm Mountain

The Snowstorm Mountains are a mountain range in Elko County, Nevada, United States.

== See also ==
- List of mountain ranges of Nevada
