= Gray Hills =

Mountain range in Lyon County, Nevada, US

- Location within Nevada

Highest point
- Elevation: 2,026 m (6,647 ft)

Geography
- Country: United States
- State: Nevada
- District: Lyon County
- Range coordinates: 38°49′1.704″N 118°56′55.530″W
- Topo map: USGS Buck Brush Spring

The Gray Hills are a mountain range in Lyon County, Nevada, USA.
