= Cambridge Hills =

Mountain range in Nevada, United States

- Location within Nevada

Highest point
- Elevation: 1,636 m (5,367 ft)

Geography
- Country: United States
- State: Nevada
- District: Lyon County
- Range coordinates: 38°46′1.699″N 119°2′48.538″W
- Topo map: USGS Yerington SE

The Cambridge Hills are a mountain range in Lyon County, Nevada.
