= Terraced Hills =

Mountain range in Nevada, United States

- Location within Nevada

Highest point
- Elevation: 1,669 m (5,476 ft)

Geography
- Country: United States
- State: Nevada
- District: Washoe County
- Range coordinates: 40°13′26.658″N 119°43′50.706″W
- Topo map: USGS The Needle Rocks

The Terraced Hills are a mountain range in Washoe County, Nevada.

Deposits of Halloysite are found in the Terraced Hills where in 2014 it was mined by the Art Wilson Company for the Nevada Cement's plant in Fernley.
