= San Antonio Mountains =

Mountain range in Nye and Esmeralda counties in Nevada, United States

- Location within Nevada

Highest point
- Elevation: 1,884 m (6,181 ft)

Geography
- Country: United States
- State: Nevada
- County: Nye and Esmeralda counties
- Range coordinates: 38°04′02″N 117°11′42″W
- Topo map: USGS Tonopah

The San Antonio Mountains is a mountain range in the Great Basin in the Nye and Esmeralda counties in Nevada, United States.

== See also ==
- List of mountain ranges of Nevada
