= White Throne Mountains =

Mountain range in Nevada, United States

- Location within Nevada

Highest point
- Elevation: 1,428 m (4,685 ft)

Geography
- Country: United States
- State: Nevada
- District: Churchill County
- Range coordinates: 39°15′32.712″N 118°43′4.525″W
- Topo map: USGS Carson Lake

The White Throne Mountains are a mountain range in Churchill County, Nevada.
