= Martin Creek Mountains =

Mountain range in Nevada, United States

- Location within Nevada

Highest point
- Elevation: 2,198 m (7,211 ft)

Geography
- Country: United States
- State: Nevada
- District: Humboldt County
- Range coordinates: 41°39′6.615″N 117°25′53.467″W
- Topo map: USGS Black Ridge

The Martin Creek Mountains are a mountain range in Humboldt County, Nevada.
