= Elk Mountains (Nevada) =

Mountain range in Elko County, Nevada, United States

- Location within Nevada

Highest point
- Elevation: 2,682.85 m (8,802.0 ft)

Geography
- Country: United States
- State: Nevada
- District: Elko County
- Range coordinates: 41°57′46″N 115°03′42″W
- Topo map: USGS Elk Mountain

The Elk Mountains are a mountain range in Elko County, Nevada, United States. The range is contained within the Jarbidge Ranger District of the Humboldt-Toiyabe National Forest and is considered to be a sub-range of the Jarbidge Mountains. The highest point is Elk Mountain.
