= Jarbidge Peak =

Mountain in Nevada, United States

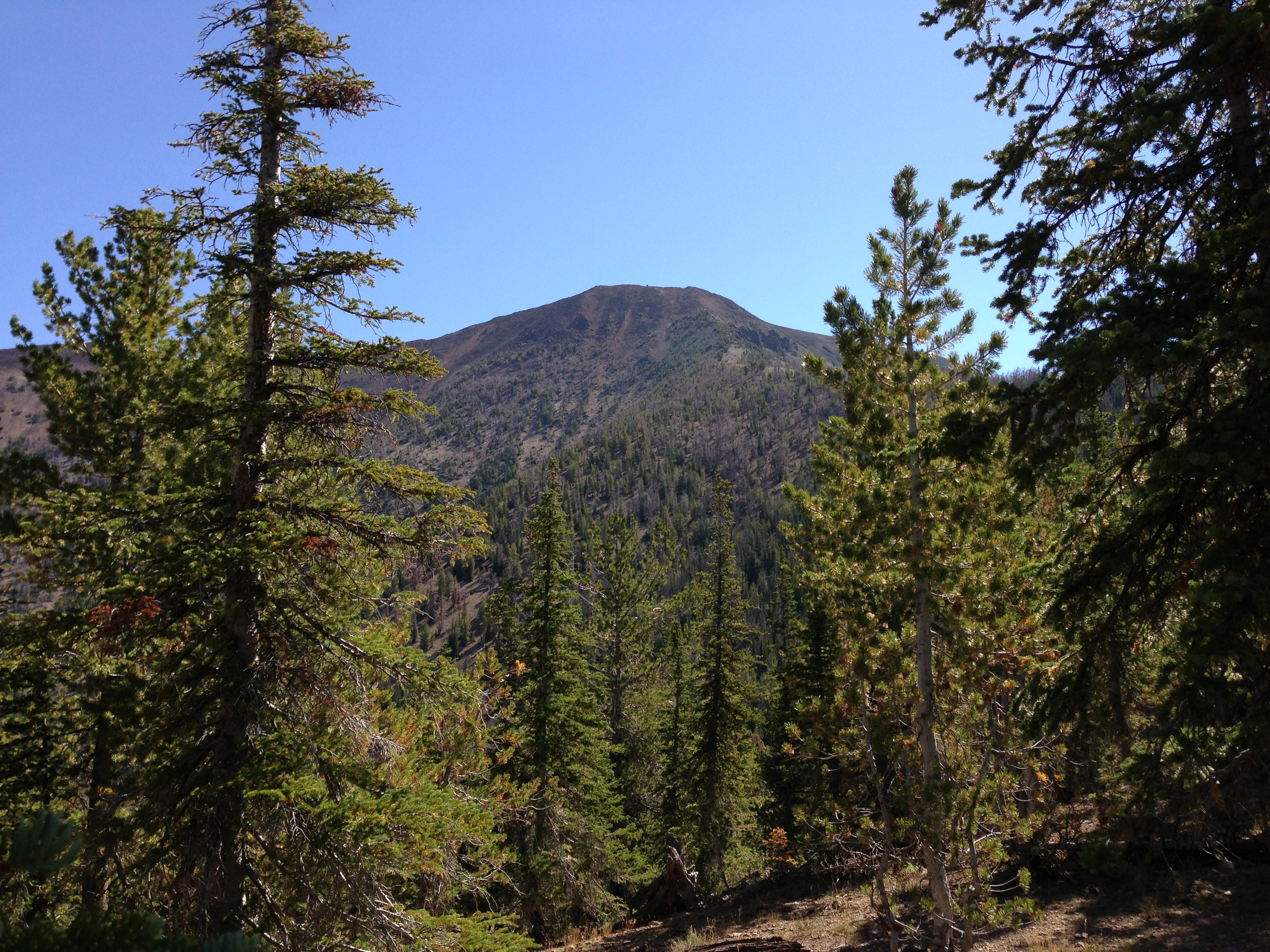
- Jarbidge Peak viewed from the ridge south of Bonanza Gulch

Highest point
- Elevation: 10,799 ft (3,292 m) NAVD 88
- Prominence: 621 ft (189 m)
- Coordinates: 41°50′25″N 115°23′25″W

Geography
- Location within Nevada
- Location: Elko County, Nevada, U.S.

Jarbidge Peak is the second highest mountain in the Jarbidge Mountains of northern Elko County, Nevada, United States. It is located within the Jarbidge Ranger District of the Humboldt-Toiyabe National Forest. The boundary of the Jarbidge Wilderness crosses the peak.

"Jarbidge" is a name derived from the Shoshone language meaning "devil". Indians believed the hills were haunted.

== Climate ==
Climate data for Jarbidge Peak 41.8425 N, 115.3905 W, Elevation: 10,249 ft (3,124 m) (1991–2020 normals)
Month	Jan	Feb	Mar	Apr	May	Jun	Jul	Aug	Sep	Oct	Nov	Dec	Year
Mean daily maximum °F (°C)	25.3 (−3.7)	25.3 (−3.7)	30.3 (−0.9)	35.0 (1.7)	44.6 (7.0)	55.2 (12.9)	66.8 (19.3)	66.0 (18.9)	56.8 (13.8)	43.5 (6.4)	30.8 (−0.7)	24.4 (−4.2)	42.0 (5.6)
Daily mean °F (°C)	17.9 (−7.8)	16.8 (−8.4)	20.6 (−6.3)	24.7 (−4.1)	33.7 (0.9)	43.2 (6.2)	53.8 (12.1)	53.0 (11.7)	44.2 (6.8)	32.9 (0.5)	22.9 (−5.1)	17.1 (−8.3)	31.7 (−0.2)
Mean daily minimum °F (°C)	10.5 (−11.9)	8.3 (−13.2)	10.9 (−11.7)	14.5 (−9.7)	22.8 (−5.1)	31.2 (−0.4)	40.8 (4.9)	40.0 (4.4)	31.6 (−0.2)	22.4 (−5.3)	15.0 (−9.4)	9.9 (−12.3)	21.5 (−5.8)
Average precipitation inches (mm)	5.34 (136)	4.35 (110)	4.97 (126)	5.82 (148)	5.28 (134)	2.54 (65)	1.11 (28)	0.96 (24)	1.48 (38)	2.85 (72)	4.29 (109)	5.57 (141)	44.56 (1,131)
Source: PRISM Climate Group

== Summit panorama ==
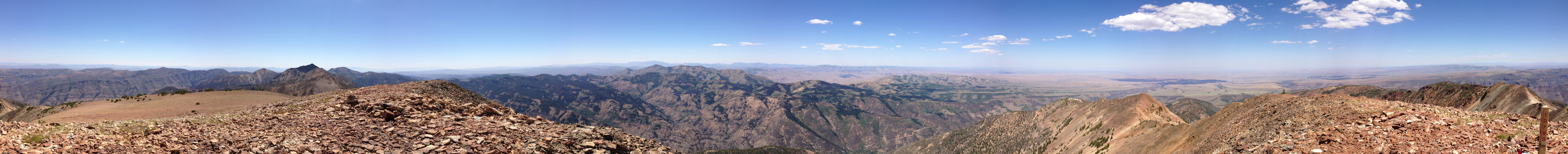
360-degree panorama from the summit of Jarbidge Peak
