= Barnett Hills =

Mountain range in Nevada, United States

- Location within Nevada

Highest point
- Elevation: 1,808 m (5,932 ft)

Geography
- Country: United States
- State: Nevada
- District: Churchill County
- Range coordinates: 39°8′31.716″N 118°33′18.495″W
- Topo map: USGS Diamond Field Jack Wash

The Barnett Hills are a mountain range in Churchill County, Nevada.
