= Whistler Range =

Mountain range in Nevada, United States

- Location within Nevada

Highest point
- Peak: Whistler Mountain
- Elevation: 2,485 m (8,153 ft)

Geography
- Country: United States
- State: Nevada
- District: Eureka County
- Range coordinates: 39°42′39.732″N 116°7′32.229″W
- Topo map: USGS Whistler Mountain

The Whistler Range is a mountain range in Eureka County, Nevada. The 8,153 foot Whistler Mountain is the highest point in this small range.
