= Bunejug Mountains =

Mountain range in Nevada, United States

- Location within Nevada

Highest point
- Elevation: 1,492 m (4,895 ft)

Geography
- Country: United States
- State: Nevada
- District: Churchill County
- Range coordinates: 39°18′3.712″N 118°36′41.513″W
- Topo map: USGS Bunejug Mountains

The Bunejug Mountains are a mountain range in Churchill County, Nevada.
