= Seaman Range =

Mountain range in Nevada, United States

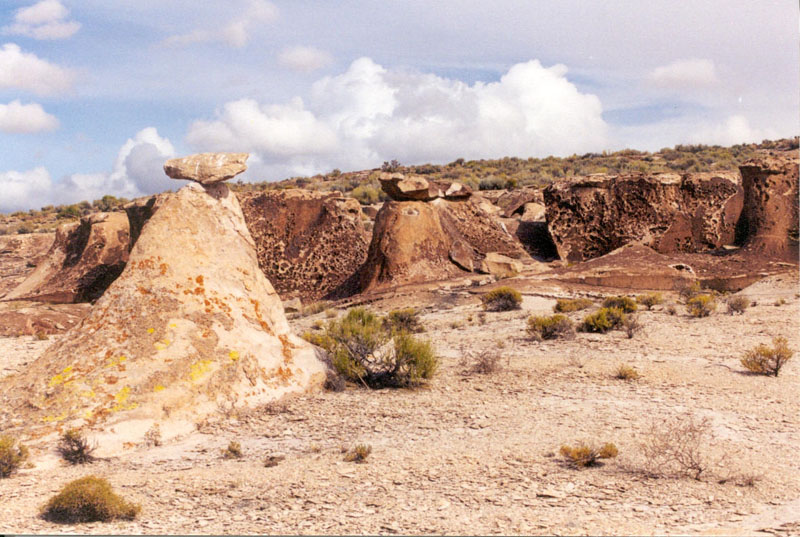
- Weepah Spring Wilderness at Timber Mountain

Highest point
- Elevation: 8,442 ft (2,573 m)
- Coordinates: 38°00′06″N 115°05′09″W

Dimensions
- Length: 30 mi (48 km) NNE (10 mi north section, NW)
- Width: 9 mi (14 km) (widest at Timber Mountain massif, northwest section, ~6 mi)

Geography
- Location within Nevada
- Country: United States
- State: Nevada
- Region: White River Watershed
- Counties: Lincoln and Nye
- Communities: Hiko and Crystal Springs
- Borders on: White River, Schell Creek, Fairview Ranges, North Pahroc Range, Mount Irish Range, Coal Valley and Golden Gate Range
- Topo map: USGS Timber Mountain Pass East

The Seaman Range is a 30-mile (48 km) long mountain range in Lincoln and Nye counties, Nevada, in the western United States.

The range lies at the south perimeter of the large north-trending White River Valley, along with Coal Valley to its west. The eastern side of the mountain range forces the south-flowing White River to course southeast, south, and then south-southwesterly, towards Hiko and the Key Pittman Wildlife Management Area.

The central-south of the range is anchored by the Timber Mountain massif and on its southeast creates the White River Narrows. The Weepah Spring Wilderness is located at Timber Mountain.

== Description ==
The range is made of two trending sections; the north section trends from Timber Mountain, about 10 mi due northwest, at the south of White River Valley. The massif of Timber Mountain at 8,442 feet (2,573 m) anchors the range center. The entire south section, about 20 mi long trends south-southwesterly. Coincidentally, for this region, the following ranges, valleys, and rivercourses show this parallelism trend, part of the Basin and Range: the list from west to east are: Golden Gate Range, Coal Valley, Seaman Range, section of the White River, Delamar Valley and Dry Lake Valley, Burnt Springs Range, Delamar Mountains, and in the east, section of Meadow Valley Wash.

== Access ==
Nevada State Route 318 traverses the southeast, east, and part of the northeast of the range. It follows the course of the White River, from Hiko and Crystal Springs, about 20 miles south of Timber Mountain. Route 318 continues north into the east side of White River Valley, reaching Lund, about 50 mi distant.

Unimproved dirt road Seaman Wash Road at the southwest range perimeter, accesses the center-south of Coal Valley, and the Coal Valley Reservoir, at dissected land or saltflats. Other unimproved roads from eastern Coal Valley or Seaman Wash Road access the west, southwest, and northwest of the range.
