= Desert Creek Mountains =

Mountain range in Nevada, U.S.

- Location within Nevada

Highest point
- Elevation: 2,010 m (6,590 ft)

Geography
- Country: United States
- State: Nevada
- District: Lyon County
- Range coordinates: 38°36′39.689″N 119°17′2.566″W
- Topo map: USGS Desert Creek Peak

The Desert Creek Mountains are a mountain range in Lyon County, Nevada.
