= Monitor Hills =

Mountain range in Nevada, United States

- Location within Nevada

Highest point
- Elevation: 1,860 m (6,100 ft)

Geography
- Country: United States
- State: Nevada
- District: Nye County
- Range coordinates: 37°56′48.769″N 116°53′39.245″W
- Topo map: USGS Monitor Peak

The Monitor Hills are a mountain range in Nye County, Nevada.
