= Weepah Hills =

Mountain range in Nevada, United States

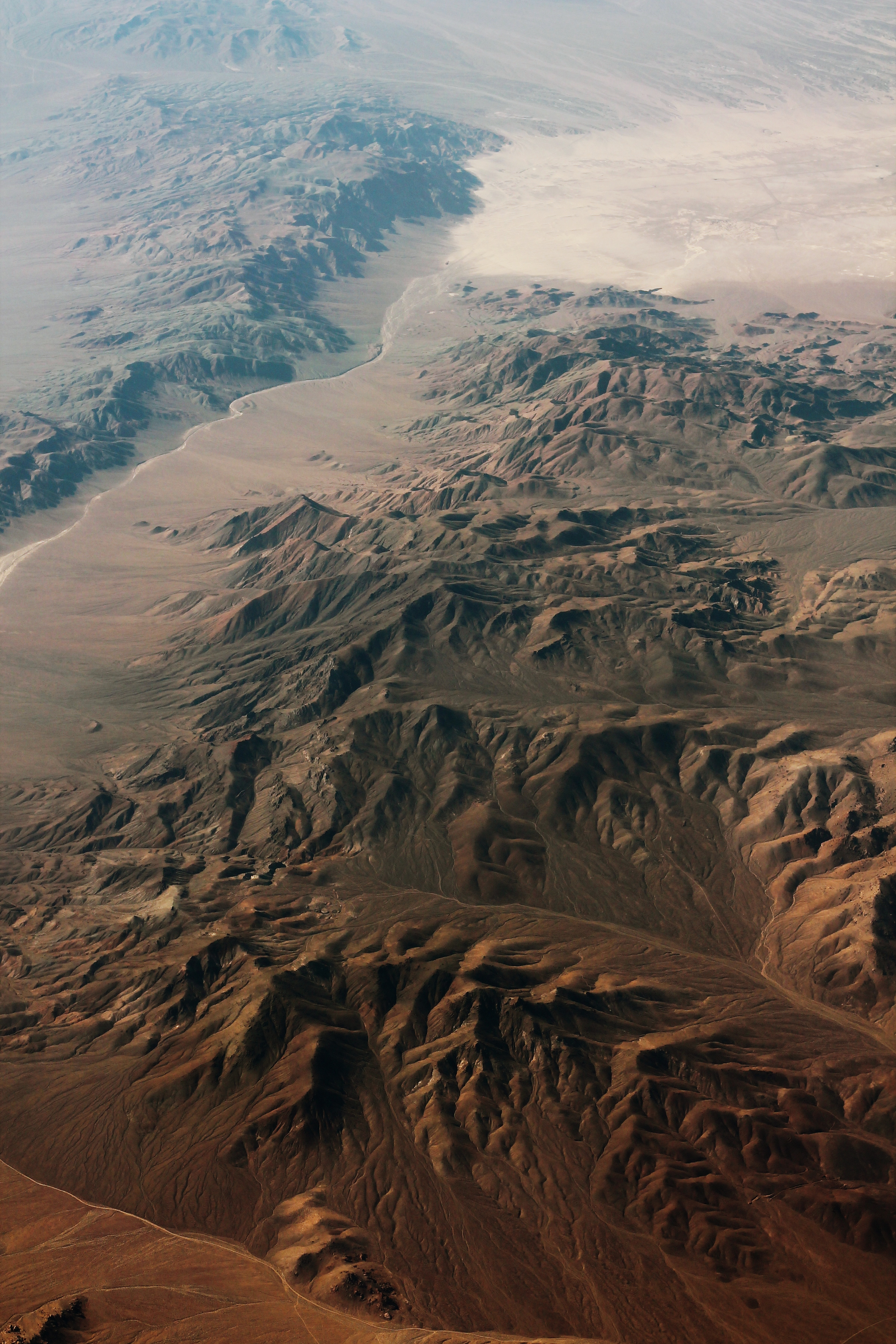
- Aerial view of the mountains

Highest point
- Elevation: 2,068 m (6,785 ft)

Geography
- Location within Nevada
- Country: United States
- State: Nevada
- District: Esmeralda County
- Range coordinates: 37°54′57.754″N 117°31′34.329″W
- Topo map: USGS Weepah

The Weepah Hills are a mountain range in Esmeralda County, Nevada. The highest point in the mountains is over 2,000 m (6,600 ft). They are named for the Shoshone word meaning 'rainwater'.
