= Peko (surname) =

Peko is a surname. Notable people with the surname include:

- Domata Peko (born 1984), American football player
- Ivan Peko (born 1990), Croatian football player
- Kyle Peko (born 1993), American football player, cousin of Domata
- Tupe Peko (born 1978), American football player
