= Sinkavata Hills =

Mountain range in Nevada, United States

- Location within Nevada

Highest point
- Elevation: 1,762 m (5,781 ft)

Geography
- Country: United States
- State: Nevada
- District: Mineral County
- Range coordinates: 39°4′6.733″N 118°12′50.461″W
- Topo map: USGS Slate Mountain

The Sinkavata Hills are a mountain range in Mineral County, Nevada.
