= Garfield Hills =

Mountain range in Nevada, United States

- Location within Nevada

Highest point
- Elevation: 2,321 m (7,615 ft)

Geography
- Country: United States
- State: Nevada
- District: Mineral County
- Range coordinates: 38°27′3.725″N 118°17′47.450″W
- Topo map: USGS Mable Mountain

The Garfield Hills are a mountain range in Mineral County, Nevada, in the Great Basin.
