= Ichabod Range =

Mountain range in Nevada, United States

- Location within Nevada

Highest point
- Elevation: 2,000 m (6,600 ft)

Geography
- Country: United States
- State: Nevada
- District: Elko County
- Range coordinates: 41°43′24.663″N 115°37′40.275″W
- Topo map: USGS Cornwall Mountain

The Ichabod Range is a mountain range in Elko County, Nevada. The northern portion of the range is contained within the Mountain City Ranger District of the Humboldt–Toiyabe National Forest. The range is considered to be a sub-range of the Jarbidge Mountains.
