= Santa Renia Mountains =

Mountain range in Elko County, Nevada, US

- Location within Nevada

Highest point
- Elevation: 1,821 m (5,974 ft)

Geography
- Country: United States
- State: Nevada
- District: Elko County
- Range coordinates: 41°6′10.669″N 116°29′18.339″W
- Topo map: USGS Santa Renia Fields

The Santa Renia Mountains are a mountain range in Elko County, Nevada.
