= Pinto Peak Range =

Mountain range in Nevada, United States

- Location within Nevada

Highest point
- Elevation: 1,987 m (6,519 ft)

Geography
- Country: United States
- State: Nevada
- District: Washoe County
- Range coordinates: 41°23′7.624″N 119°45′10.740″W
- Topo map: USGS Boulder Lake

The Pinto Peak Range is a mountain range in Washoe County, Nevada.
