= Terril Mountains =

Mountain range in Nevada, United States

- Location within Nevada

Highest point
- Elevation: 6,084 ft (1,854 m)
- Coordinates: 39°4′51.03″N 118°42′57.38″W

Geography
- Country: United States
- State: Nevada

The Terril Mountains are located in west-central Nevada in the United States. The range is located at the northern end of the Walker River Indian Reservation where Lyon County, Mineral County, and Churchill County meet.

The small range reaches an elevation of 6,084 feet at Brown Knob. The mountains are located south of Fallon and east of Yerington. The Terril Mountains are home to at least eight different species of lizards.
