= Home Camp Range =

Mountain range in Nevada, United States

- Location within Nevada

Highest point
- Elevation: 2,131 m (6,991 ft)

Geography
- Country: United States
- State: Nevada
- District: Washoe County
- Range coordinates: 41°17′57.626″N 119°48′17.743″W
- Topo map: USGS Boulder Mountain

The Home Camp Range is a mountain range in Washoe County, Nevada.
