= Elbow Range =

Mountain range in Nevada, United States

- Location within Nevada

Highest point
- Elevation: 1,092 m (3,583 ft)

Geography
- Country: United States
- State: Nevada
- District: Clark County
- Range coordinates: 36°47′19.883″N 114°59′47.018″W
- Topo map: USGS Wildcat Wash SW

The Elbow Range is a mountain range in Clark County, Nevada.
