= General Thomas Hills =

Mountain range in Nevada, United States

- Location within Nevada

Highest point
- Elevation: 1,991 m (6,532 ft)

Geography
- Country: United States
- State: Nevada
- District: Esmeralda County
- Range coordinates: 37°57′41.756″N 117°24′16.315″W
- Topo map: USGS Paymaster Canyon

The General Thomas Hills are a mountain range in Esmeralda County, Nevada.
