= Leppy Hills =

Mountain range in Nevada, United States

- Location within Nevada

Highest point
- Elevation: 1,988 m (6,522 ft)

Geography
- Country: United States
- State: Nevada
- District: Elko County
- Range coordinates: 40°47′15.747″N 114°4′44.043″W
- Topo map: USGS Leppy Peak

The Leppy Hills are a mountain range in Elko County, Nevada.
