= Bone Mountains =

Mountain range in Nevada, United States

- Location within Nevada

Highest point
- Elevation: 2,074 m (6,804 ft)

Geography
- Country: United States
- State: Nevada
- District: Elko County
- Range coordinates: 41°25′38.679″N 115°44′18.275″W
- Topo map: USGS Double Mountain

The Bone Mountains are a mountain range in Elko County, Nevada.
