= Windermere Hills =

Mountain range in Nevada, United States

- Location within Nevada

Highest point
- Elevation: 2,167 m (7,110 ft)

Naming
- Etymology: Named for Windermere, a small town in England.

Geography
- Country: United States
- State: Nevada
- District: Elko County
- Range coordinates: 41°14′35.718″N 114°44′24.135″W
- Topo map: USGS Holborn

The Windermere Hills is a mountain range in Elko County, Nevada, located northeast of Wells, Nevada. In 1967, when the name was approved, the Windermere Hills were described as being bounded by the Thousand Springs Creek to the north, the Southern Pacific line to the south, the Union Pacific line to the west and an unnamed valley to the east. The hills are named for Windermere, a small town in England.
