= Hiller Mountains =

Mountain range in Nevada, United States

- Location within Nevada

Highest point
- Elevation: 659 m (2,162 ft)
- Coordinates: 36°2′28.950″N 114°10′52.872″W

Geography
- Country: United States
- State: Nevada
- District: Clark County
- Topo map: USGS Hiller Mountains

The Hiller Mountains are a mountain range in Clark County, Nevada.
