= Dry Hills =

Mountain range in Nevada, United States

- Location within Nevada

Highest point
- Elevation: 2,333 m (7,654 ft)

Geography
- Country: United States
- State: Nevada
- District: Eureka County
- Range coordinates: 40°6′44.713″N 116°33′24.292″W
- Topo map: USGS Dugout Spring

The Dry Hills are a mountain range in Eureka County, Nevada.
