= French Mountains =

Mountain range in Nevada, United States

- Location within Nevada

Highest point
- Elevation: 1,652 m (5,420 ft)

Geography
- Country: United States
- State: Nevada
- District: Washoe County
- Range coordinates: 39°48′34.667″N 119°52′39.704″W
- Topo map: USGS Granite Peak

The French Mountains are a mountain range in Washoe County, Nevada.
