= Blow Sand Mountains =

Mountain range in Nevada, United States

- Location within Nevada

Highest point
- Elevation: 1,412 m (4,633 ft)

Geography
- Country: United States
- State: Nevada
- District: Churchill County
- Range coordinates: 39°10′35.714″N 118°38′57.511″W
- Topo map: USGS Allen Springs

The Blow Sand Mountains are a mountain range in Churchill County, Nevada.
