= Cocoon Mountains =

Mountain range in Nevada, US

- Location within Nevada

Highest point
- Elevation: 1,861 m (6,106 ft)

Geography
- Country: United States
- State: Nevada
- District: Churchill County
- Range coordinates: 39°12′45.715″N 118°32′6.496″W
- Topo map: USGS Diamond Field Jack Wash

The Cocoon Mountains are a mountain range in Churchill County, Nevada. Nearby cities include Fallon and Reno.
