= Broken Hills =

Mountain range in Nevada, United States

- Location within Nevada

Highest point
- Elevation: 1,953 m (6,407 ft)

Geography
- Country: United States
- State: Nevada
- District: Churchill County
- Range coordinates: 39°6′12.730″N 117°58′10.434″W
- Topo map: USGS Quartz Mountain

The Broken Hills, or Broken Hills Range, is a mountain range bordering Churchill County, Nevada, and Mineral County, Nevada.

== History ==
Joseph Arthur and James Stratford discovered the Broken Hills district in 1913, and were the first prospectors to find ore worth mining.
