= Sand Range =

Mountain range in Nevada, United States

- Location within Nevada

Highest point
- Elevation: 1,373 m (4,505 ft)

Geography
- Country: United States
- State: Nevada
- District: Washoe County
- Range coordinates: 40°21′20.653″N 119°50′18.725″W
- Topo map: USGS Sand Pass

The Sand Range is a mountain range in Washoe County, Nevada.
