= Medicine Range =

Mountain range in Nevada, United States

Coordinates: 40.44°N 115.47°W

The Medicine Range is a group of hills and low mountains in southern Elko County, in the northeastern section of the state of Nevada in the Great Basin region of the western United States.

High Bald Mountain is 9,251 feet in elevation and the highest point in the range.
