= Golden Gate Range =

Mountain range in Nevada, United States

- Location within Nevada

Highest point
- Elevation: 2,489 m (8,166 ft)
- Coordinates: 37°51′29″N 115°26′31″W

Geography
- Country: United States
- State: Nevada
- Region: Sand Spring-Tikaboo Watershed
- District(s): Lincoln County and Nye County
- Range coordinates: 37°55′41″N 115°23′50″W
- Topo map: USGS Murphy Gap NW

The Golden Gate Range is a mountain range in northwest Lincoln, and eastern Nye counties Nevada. The range trends north-northeast between the Garden Valley to the west and the Coal Valley to the east. The southern end of the range in Lincoln County contains the highest peaks whereas the northern portion exists as a broken string of lower hills separated by water gaps. The northeast end of the range is bounded by the White River Valley to the east. The Worthington Mountains, the Quinn Canyon Range and the Grant Range lie to the west and northwest with the Seaman Range to the east and Timpahute Range and Mount Irish Range to the south.

The Golden Gate Range is within the Basin and Range National Monument designated by President Barack Obama in 2015.
