= Mallard Hills =

Mountain range in Nevada, United States

- Location within Nevada

Highest point
- Elevation: 2,052 m (6,732 ft)

Geography
- Country: United States
- State: Nevada
- District: Elko County
- Range coordinates: 41°21′20.696″N 115°24′11.229″W
- Topo map: USGS Hanks Creek SW

The Mallard Hills are a mountain range in Elko County, Nevada.
