= Anne Vabarna =

Estonian folk singer

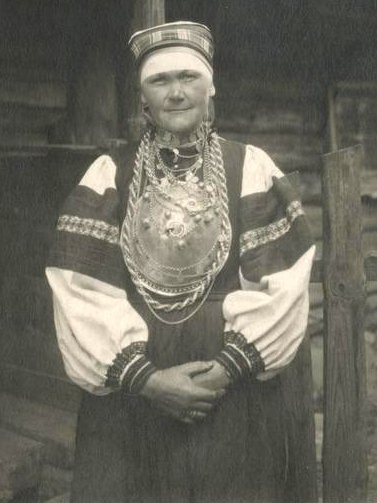
Anne Vabarna

Anne Vabarna (21 December 1877 in Võpolsova – 7 December 1964 in Tonja) was a Seto singer.

== Early life ==
Vabarna was born into a large family in 1877. Her family lived in the village of Võpolsova near Lake Pskov. Her birthplace in Võpolsova is marked by a memorial monument created by sculptor Elmar Rebane.

Folk song was her primary informal education. She did not learn how to read and write. She was taught folk song by two of her sisters who were singers as well as her mother. She credited her mother for instilling in her an appreciation for song. Her mother passed away when she was seven years old. She was sent to live with her father's sister and was raised by her.

== Career ==
Vabarna moved to the village of Tonja, which was nearby when she was eighteen. She moved there after being married off by her family to a poor farmer there in the village and would spend the rest of her life there.

Finnish folklorist Armas Otto Väisänen met Vabarna during a folklore collection expedition in the summer of 1923 and promoted her work.

Vabarna became known as the Seto Mother of Song. In her lifetime, she recorded over 140,000 verses. Vabarna was the creator of the runic-versees Neio koolulaul, Suurõq sajaq, and Peko. Her most well known work was the composition of the Seto national epic 'Peko'. It depicts the tale of the Seto hero who provides freedom for the Seto people. Her repertoire also included songs of traditional Seto lyric and lyric-epic types, children's songs, prayers, fifty two bridal laments, improvisations (dedicated to collectors of folklore, statesmen, doctors, guests-all in all over 20,000 verses), epic compositions and folk tales. The Setomaa Parish awards the Anne Vabarna Heritage Culture Prize for outstanding work in passing down Seto traditional culture.

== Death and legacy ==
Vabarna is credited with recording Seto style of song. She died in 1964. She had raised nine children.

== Personal life ==
Vabarna was the great-grandmother of cultural activist and singer Jane Vabarna.
