= Paymaster Ridge =

Mountain range in Nevada, United States

- Location within Nevada

Highest point
- Elevation: 1,769 m (5,804 ft)

Geography
- Country: United States
- State: Nevada
- District: Esmeralda County
- Range coordinates: 37°51′0.755″N 117°27′37.318″W
- Topo map: USGS Paymaster Ridge

The Paymaster Ridge is a mountain range in Esmeralda County, Nevada.
