= Mosquito Mountain =

Mountain range in Oregon and Nevada, United States

- Location within Nevada

Highest point
- Elevation: 1,957 m (6,421 ft)

Geography
- Country: United States
- State: Nevada
- District(s): Washoe County, Nevada and Lake County, Oregon
- Range coordinates: 41°54′2.612″N 119°48′23.786″W
- Topo map: USGS Little Coleman Canyon

Mosquito Mountain is a mountain range in Washoe County, Nevada and Lake County, Oregon.
