= Wild Horse Range =

Mountain range in Nevada, United States

- Location within Nevada

Highest point
- Elevation: 2,138 m (7,014 ft)

Geography
- Country: United States
- State: Nevada
- District: Elko County
- Range coordinates: 41°44′6.656″N 115°51′56.310″W
- Topo map: USGS Wild Horse

The Wild Horse Range is a mountain range in Elko County, Nevada, United States, northwest of the Owyhee River's Wild Horse Reservoir. It is contained within the Mountain City Ranger District of the Humboldt–Toiyabe National Forest. The range is considered to be a sub-range of the Jarbidge Mountains.
