= Junction House Range =

Mountain range in Nevada, United States

- Location within Nevada

Highest point
- Elevation: 1,652 m (5,420 ft)

Geography
- Country: United States
- State: Nevada
- District: Washoe County
- Range coordinates: 39°37′28.676″N 119°47′33.688″W
- Topo map: USGS Reno

The Junction House Range is a mountain range in Washoe County, Nevada.
