= Bruneau Range =

Mountain range in Nevada, United States

- Location within Nevada

Highest point
- Elevation: 2,091 m (6,860 ft)

Geography
- Country: United States
- State: Nevada
- District: Elko County
- Range coordinates: 41°55′59.649″N 115°51′45.323″W
- Topo map: USGS Hicks Mountain

The Bruneau Range is a mountain range in Elko County, Nevada, United States. It is contained within the Mountain City Ranger District of the Humboldt–Toiyabe National Forest. The range is considered to be a sub-range of the Jarbidge Mountains.
