= Rawhide Hills =

Mountain range in Nevada, United States

- Location within Nevada

Highest point
- Elevation: 1,672 m (5,486 ft)

Geography
- Country: United States
- State: Nevada
- District: Mineral County
- Range coordinates: 38°58′39.721″N 118°26′8.472″W
- Topo map: USGS Pilot Cone

The Rawhide Hills are a mountain range in Mineral County, Nevada.
