= Idaho Canyon Range =

Mountain range in Nevada, United States

- Location within Nevada

Highest point
- Peak: Big Mountain
- Elevation: 2,124.7 m (6,971 ft)

Geography
- Country: United States
- State: Nevada
- District: Humboldt County
- Range coordinates: 41°42′35.625″N 118°58′59.669″W
- Topo map: USGS Knott Creek Ranch

The Idaho Canyon Range is a mountain range in Humboldt County, Nevada. The highest summit in the range is Big Mountain at 6,971 feet in elevation.
