= Salmon River Range =

Mountain range in Nevada, United States

- Location within Nevada

Highest point
- Elevation: 2,168 m (7,113 ft)

Geography
- Country: United States
- State: Nevada
- District: Elko County
- Range coordinates: 41°50′35.681″N 114°50′9.150″W
- Topo map: USGS Contact

The Salmon River Range is a mountain range in Elko County, Nevada. The range is considered to be a sub-range of the Jarbidge Mountains.
