= Lost Creek Hills =

Mountain range in Nevada, United States

- Location within Nevada

Highest point
- Elevation: 1,979 m (6,493 ft)

Geography
- Country: United States
- State: Nevada
- District: Washoe County
- Range coordinates: 41°10′22.629″N 119°43′6.724″W
- Topo map: USGS Bordwell Spring

The Lost Creek Hills are a mountain range in Washoe County, Nevada.
