= Monte Cristo Mountains =

Mountain range in Nevada, United States

- Location within Nevada

Highest point
- Elevation: 2,004 m (6,575 ft)

Geography
- Country: United States
- State: Nevada
- District: Nye County
- Range coordinates: 38°58′53.732″N 118°8′13.449″W
- Topo map: USGS Mount Annie

The Monte Cristo Mountains are a mountain range in Nye County, Nevada.
