= Ararat Hills =

Mountain range in Nevada, United States

- Location within Nevada

Highest point
- Elevation: 1,740 m (5,710 ft)

Geography
- Country: United States
- State: Nevada
- District: Humboldt County
- Range coordinates: 41°32′46.621″N 117°18′2.447″W
- Topo map: USGS Hardscrabble

The Ararat Hills are a mountain range in Humboldt County, Nevada.
