= Tikaboo Range =

Mountain range in Lincoln County, Nevada, US

- Location within Nevada

Highest point
- Elevation: 1,785 m (5,856 ft)

Geography
- Country: United States
- State: Nevada
- District: Lincoln County
- Range coordinates: 37°24′35.843″N 115°38′26.106″W
- Topo map: USGS Groom Range

The Tikaboo Range is a mountain range in Lincoln County, Nevada.
