= North Muddy Mountains =

Mountain range in Nevada, United States

- Location within Nevada

Highest point
- Elevation: 813 m (2,667 ft)

Geography
- Country: United States
- State: Nevada
- District: Clark County
- Range coordinates: 36°33′37.901″N 114°36′13.961″W
- Topo map: USGS Weiser Ridge

The North Muddy Mountains are a mountain range in Clark County, Nevada.
