= Johnnie Range =

Mountain range in Nevada, United States

- Location within Nevada

Highest point
- Elevation: 1,133 m (3,717 ft)

Geography
- Country: United States
- State: Nevada
- District: Nye County
- Range coordinates: 36°24′55.846″N 116°6′3.117″W
- Topo map: USGS Mount Schader

The Johnnie Range is a mountain range in the Mojave Desert, in southern Nye County, Nevada, United States.
