= Duck Creek Range =

Mountain range in Nevada, United States

- Location within Nevada

Highest point
- Elevation: 2,700 m (8,900 ft)

Geography
- Country: United States
- State: Nevada
- District: White Pine County
- Range coordinates: 39°19′38.781″N 114°45′24.055″W
- Topo map: USGS East Ely

The Duck Creek Range is a mountain range in White Pine County, Nevada.
