= White River Range =

Mountain range in Nevada, United States

- Location within Nevada

Highest point
- Elevation: 2,024 m (6,640 ft)

Geography
- Country: United States
- State: Nevada
- District: White Pine County
- Range coordinates: 38°49′59.785″N 115°12′33.075″W
- Topo map: USGS Douglas

The White River Range is a mountain range in White Pine County, Nevada.
