= Jumbled Hills =

Mountain range in Nevada, United States

- Location within Nevada

Highest point
- Elevation: 1,955 m (6,414 ft)

Geography
- Country: United States
- State: Nevada
- District: Lincoln County
- Range coordinates: 37°12′29.849″N 115°37′41.094″W
- Topo map: USGS Fallout Hills NW

The Jumbled Hills are a mountain range in Lincoln County, Nevada.
