= Cuprite Hills =

Mountain range in Nevada, United States

- Location within Nevada

Highest point
- Elevation: 1,837 m (6,027 ft)

Geography
- Country: United States
- State: Nevada
- District: Esmeralda County
- Range coordinates: 37°31′29.756″N 117°14′3.274″W
- Topo map: USGS Ralston

The Cuprite Hills are a mountain range in Esmeralda County, Nevada, United States.

Because of their clear separation and distinct chemical makeup, exposed mineral deposits in the Cuprite Hills have been used as a standard test site for many handheld and satellite multispectral and hyperspectral imaging systems.
