= Lahontan Mountains =

Mountain range in Nevada, United States

- Location within Nevada

Highest point
- Elevation: 1,284 m (4,213 ft)

Geography
- Country: United States
- State: Nevada
- District: Churchill County
- Range coordinates: 39°24′20.711″N 118°35′2.515″W
- Topo map: USGS Lahontan Mountains

The Lahontan Mountains are a mountain range in Churchill County, Nevada.
