= Peko =

Estonian and Finnish god

- God of barley
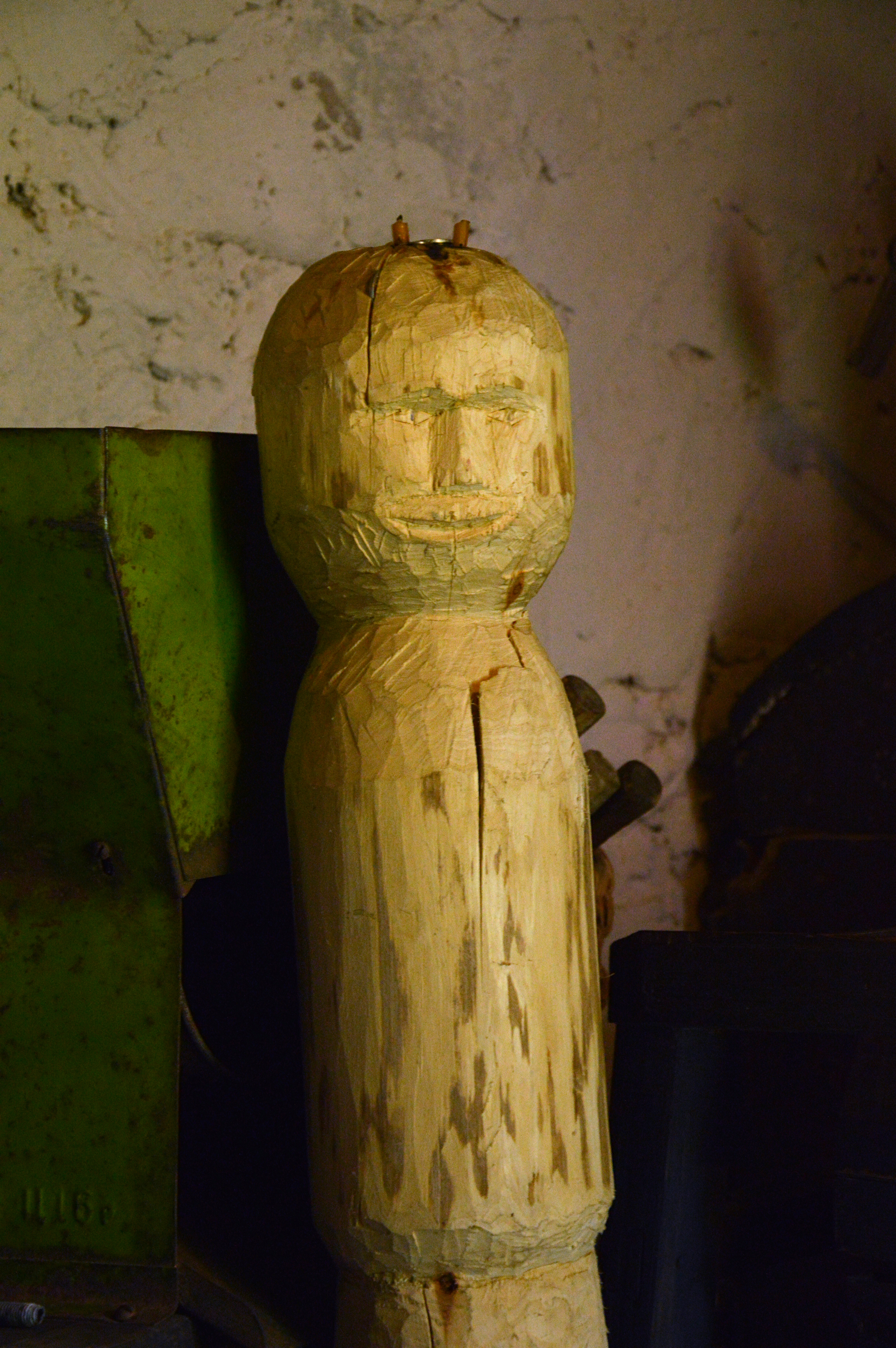
- Seto Carved idol of Peko. Radaja Seto Museum.
- Other names: Pellonpekko, Pellon pehko, Pellon pehku, Peltopekka, Pekko, Pekka, Pikki, Pikka
- Gender: Male
- Ethnic group: Setos, Finns, Estonians, Karelians

Peko (Finnish spelling Pekko, Pekka, Pellon Pekko) is an ancient Estonian and Finnish god of crops, especially barley and brewing. In the area of Setomaa, between Estonia and Russia, inhabited by the Seto language-speaking Setos, the cult of Peko was alive until the 20th century. Today, the Seto people (an ethnic group of Estonians in the south-east of the country) also revere Peko as their national hero and king, the name and figure are widely used as a national symbol.

== Name ==
Magnus Olsen connected Peko to Norse Byggvir, whose name comes from the Norse word for "barley". If Peko's name came from Proto-Norse, it would require the existence of the Proto-Norse form *beggwu for barley. Kaarle Krohn pointed out the Finnish connection of the name Pekka to Pietari (biblical Peter). Nils Lid initially believed pekko to not be a loan, but the name of the common horsetail; Uno Harva denied this, stating that the word of the plant in the Karelian Isthmus and Ingria is pökkö instead.

== Legend ==
In Finland, Peko is known as Pellon Pekko 'Pekko of the Field'. First mentioned by bishop Agricola in 1551 as the one who granted the growth of barley, Christfried Ganander called him the god of barley. He gave good wort called pellon maito 'milk of the field', and drinking it was called tasting or drinking Pellon Pekko. Martti Haavio connected Pellon Pekko to Saint Peter. According to Harva, Finnish-Estonian Pekko is the haltija of barley and drinks made of it. He also considered Pekko to have originally been the personification of barley. Anna-Leena Siikala supported Harva's view over Haavio's. Additionally, as beer in runic songs is often described as something which makes people festive and sing, Harva called Pekko the "ancient Finnish Bacchus" and called him the god of song and poetry as well.

Pekko is further connected to beer as in some parts of Tavastia, the word pekko itself has meant beer or sahti. In Tavastia, the name appeared in the form peltopekka and peltopekko. In North Karelia in the early 1900s, Pellon Pekka sometimes meant the haltija of the field, but usually was simply something which was used to scare children. In Finnish and Karelian runic songs, Pellon Pekko is usually mentioned when listing different types crops, along with "rye of Runkateivas". In them, Pellon Pekko works as name for an awn. Among the Forest Finns, Kaisa Vilhunen said that at the end of harvest, the last sheaf was thrown to be a pillow for Peltopekka. Harva thought that the tradition from Kaavi in which the milk of a black sheep is brought to the field when barley is becoming dry means a sacrifice to Peko.

A rare Karelian song states that Pekka created a swidden and Onni then sowed barley and brewed the first beer. Onni has been seen as the personification of luck, but Siikala argued that Onni is the same as Osmo mentioned in Finnish runic songs, the mythic sower of barley and brewer of beer. This, in Siikala's opinion, proves that Peko is an older personification or protector of barley and not a reference to Saint Peter.

In Hietajärvi, Suomussalmi, if someone had hurt themself while falling onto the ground, soil was boiled and the liquid given to the patient, while reading a spell where the pain is asked if it came from the ground, Peko from the field, and is ordered to go back into the ground.

Peko is sometimes associated with Estonian Pikne (Pitkne), Baltic Perkūnas or even Christian Saint Peter.

== Seto traditions ==
Before Pentecost festivities, before the dawn broke, young Seto men held a ritual fight until the first drop of blood was shed. The bleeding person became the host of the next year's feast. Black candles were lit to revere wooden idols of Peko. The people chanted "Peko, Peko, come to drink the beer" and some older men called the priests of Peko made sacrifices.

The second holiday dedicated to Peko was held after the harvest. Peko was also revered during Candlemas and Midsummer feasts. The carved idols of Peko were kept hidden in granaries around the year. The head of the idol typically had holes for candles.

A third holiday was held around August 4, in which the people of Setomaa sing the local anthem, host a musical competition, and elect the next representative of Peko for the year (known as ülebtsootska, the "vice-king"), before they end the celebrations with a military parade.

== Modern appearances ==
Seto folksinger Anne Vabarna has created the epic "Songs of Peko" where Peko is depicted as a Seto hero. Peko is in eternal sleep in the cave. When someone calls his name, he brings the rain to the fields. If people of his kin remember his advice and work hard, Peko sends them abundant crops. Peko is praised as a warrior who frees the country, as a hunter who gives bear skins to villagers and as a host of wedding feasts. He ploughs the field with a wooden plough and protects the people against evil spirits who make people to drink too much. Peko's spirit can also fly around as a butterfly.

The supposed grave of Peko is under an old oak tree near the Pskovo-Pechersky Monastery.

He also appears in the name of a song by Korpiklaani, a Finnish folk metal group. The song is called "Pellonpekko" and appears in their album Spirit of the Forest.

== See also ==
- Estonian mythology
- Finnish mythology
