= Wellington Hills =

Mountain range in Nevada, United States

- Location within Nevada

Highest point
- Elevation: 1,794 m (5,886 ft)

Geography
- Country: United States
- State: Nevada
- District: Nye County
- Range coordinates: 37°35′13.779″N 116°48′18.229″W
- Topo map: USGS Civet Cat Cave

The Wellington Hills are a mountain range in Nye County, Nevada.
