= West Gate Range =

Mountain range in Nevada, United States

- Location within Nevada

Highest point
- Elevation: 1,868 m (6,129 ft)

Geography
- Country: United States
- State: Nevada
- District: Churchill County
- Range coordinates: 39°12′27.730″N 118°5′1.454″W
- Topo map: USGS Bell Mountain

The West Gate Range is a mountain range in Churchill County, Nevada.
