= Jarbidge Mountains =

Mountain range in Nevada, United States

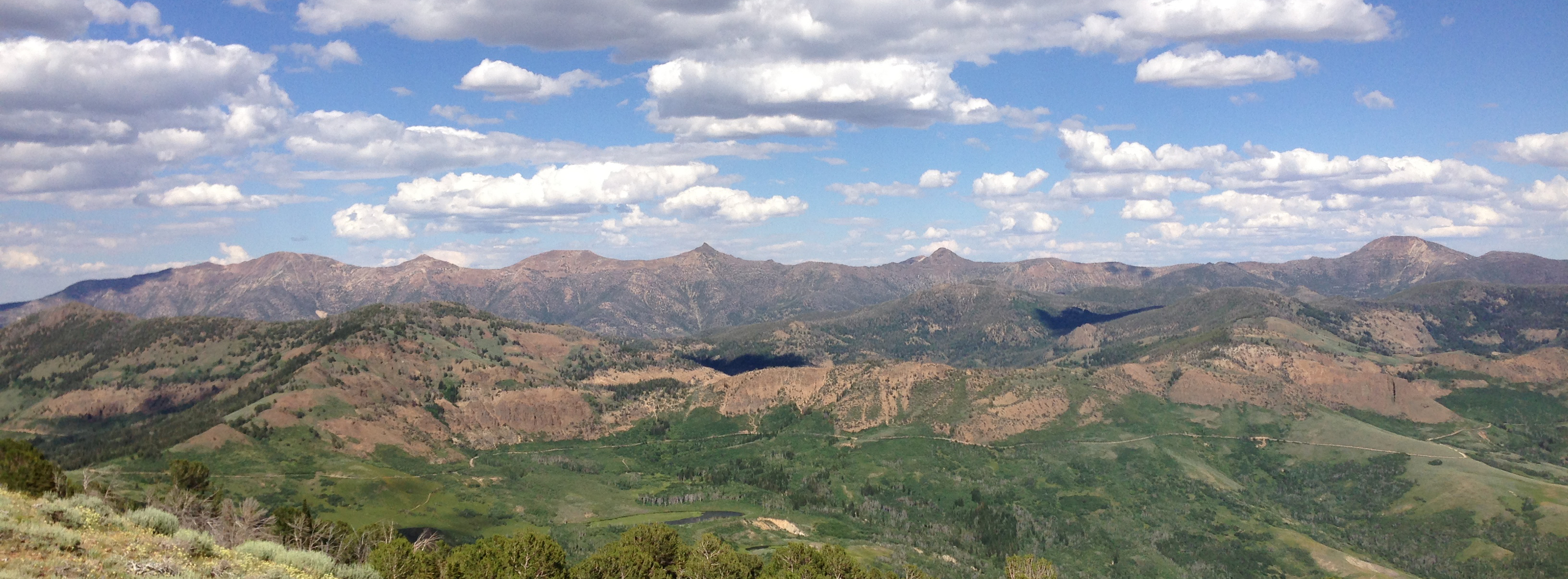
- View of the central Jarbidge Mountains from Copper Mountain

Highest point
- Peak: Matterhorn
- Elevation: 3,303 m (10,837 ft)
- Coordinates: 41°48′38″N 115°22′28″W

Geography
- Location within Nevada
- Country: United States
- State: Nevada
- District: Elko County
- Range coordinates: 41°47′28.662″N 115°30′30.261″W

The Jarbidge Mountains are a mountain range in northern Elko County, Nevada, United States. The range includes multiple sub-ranges, including the Bruneau Range, Buck Creek Mountains, Copper Mountains, Elk Mountains, Fox Creek Range, Ichabod Range, Marys River Range, Salmon River Range and Wild Horse Range. The central core of the range, including most of the peaks above 10,500 feet (3,200 m), extends southward approximately 5 miles (8 km) from a point near the small community of Jarbidge.

The central core of the Jarbidge Mountains, along with the Elk Mountains, Fox Creek Range and Marys River Range, are contained within the Jarbidge Ranger District of the Humboldt–Toiyabe National Forest. The central Jarbidge Mountains and Marys River Range are also included within the Jarbidge Wilderness. Most of the other sub-ranges west of the central core are included within the Mountain City Ranger District. The Salmon River Range is the only sub-range not included within the Humboldt–Toiyabe National Forest.

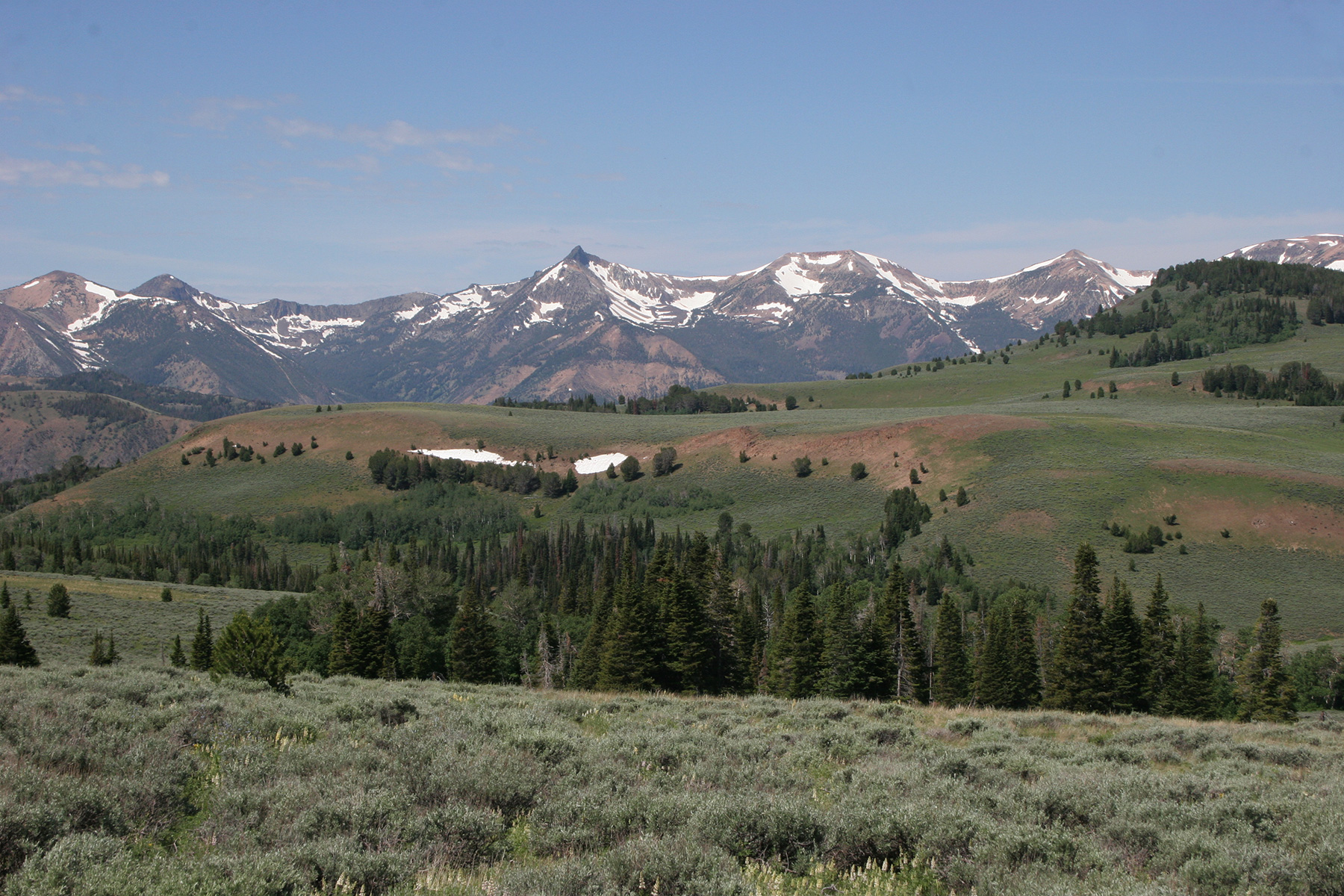
Main peaks of range from the east, Matterhorn in center left

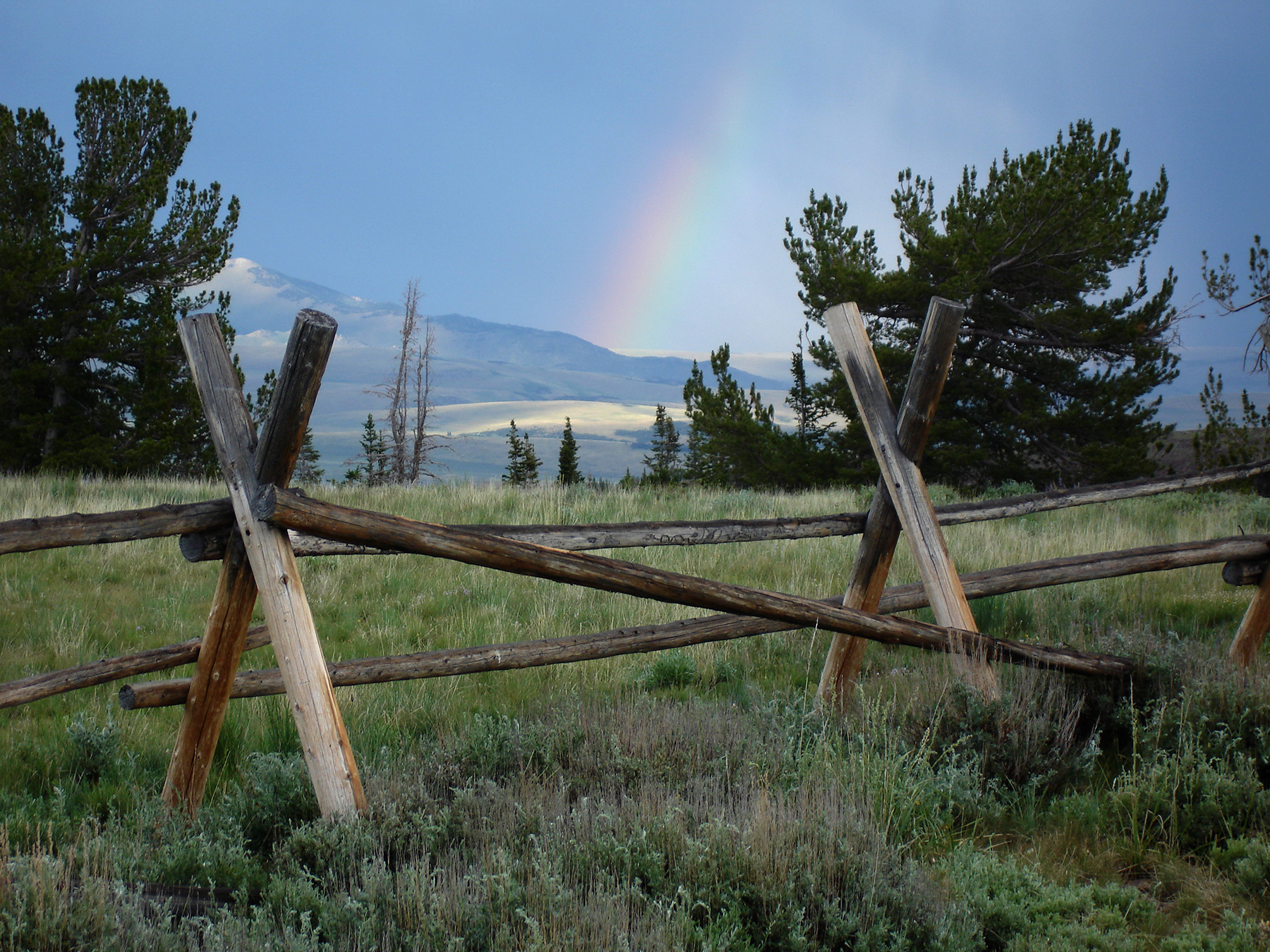
A rainbow over a rustic fence in the Jarbidge Mountains

The highest peaks in the range include:

- Matterhorn Peak 10,838 feet (3,303 m).
- Jarbidge Peak 10,793 feet (3,290 m)
- Square Top Mountain 10,694 feet (3,260 m)
- Jumbo Peak 10,635 feet (3,242 m)
- Marys River Peak 10,570 feet (3,220 m) (two miles south-southeast of the main crest in the Marys River Range)
- Cougar Peak 10,559 feet (3,218 m)
- Prospect Peak 10,439 feet (3,182 m) (one mile east of the main crest)
- God's Pocket Peak 10,185 feet (3,104 m) (four miles east of the main crest in the Marys River Range)

"Jarbidge" is a name derived from the Shoshone language meaning "devil". Indians believed the hills were haunted.
