= Anchorite Hills =

Mountain range in Nevada, United States

- Location within Nevada

Highest point
- Elevation: 2,323 m (7,621 ft)

Geography
- Country: United States
- State: Nevada
- District: Mineral County
- Range coordinates: 38°11′50.734″N 118°40′43.488″W
- Topo map: USGS Anchorite Hills

The Anchorite Hills are a mountain range in Mineral County, Nevada.
