= Cucomungo Mountains =

Mountain range in Nevada, United States

- Location within Nevada

Highest point
- Elevation: 1,886 m (6,188 ft)

Geography
- Country: United States
- State: Nevada
- District: Esmeralda County
- Range coordinates: 37°19′47.753″N 117°36′9.296″W
- Topo map: USGS Tule Canyon

The Cucomungo Mountains are a mountain range in Esmeralda County, Nevada.
