= Paradise Range =

Mountain range in Nye County, Nevada, US

- Location within Nevada

Highest point
- Elevation: 2,091 m (6,860 ft)

Geography
- Country: United States
- State: Nevada
- District: Nye County
- Range coordinates: 38°54′5.730″N 117°47′51.394″W
- Topo map: USGS Ellsworth

The Paradise Range is a mountain range in Nye County, Nevada.
