= West Range =

Mountain range in Nevada, United States

- Location within Nevada

Highest point
- Elevation: 1,802 m (5,912 ft)

Geography
- Country: United States
- State: Nevada
- District: Lincoln County
- Range coordinates: 38°3′30.858″N 114°42′7.009″W
- Topo map: USGS Bristol Well

The West Range is a mountain range in Lincoln County, Nevada.
