= Buried Hills =

Mountain range in Nevada, United States

- Location within Nevada

Highest point
- Elevation: 1,635 m (5,364 ft)

Geography
- Country: United States
- State: Nevada
- District: Lincoln County
- Range coordinates: 36°54′13.841″N 115°49′26.098″W
- Topo map: USGS Aysees Peak

The Buried Hills are a mountain range in Lincoln County, Nevada.
