= Nightingale Mountains =

Mountain range in Nevada, United States

- Location within Nevada

Highest point
- Elevation: 2,511 m (8,238 ft)

Dimensions
- Length: 20 mi (32 km) N–S
- Width: 3.4 mi (5.5 km) E–W

Geography
- Country: United States
- State: Nevada
- Watershed: Pyramid-Winnemucca Lakes Watershed
- Range coordinates: 40°04.9′N 119°14.9′W
- Borders on: N: Stonehouse Canyon and the Selenite Range; E: Sage Hen Wash and the Sahwave Mountains; S: Coyote Canyon and the Truckee Range; W: Winnemucca Lake and the Lake Range

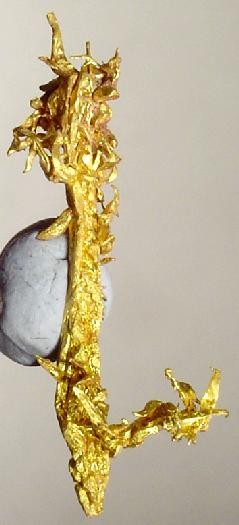
Cystalline gold from the Nightingale District

The Nightingale Mountains are a north–south trending range located along the western border of Pershing County and extending into the northeastern corner of Washoe County. The range has a length of 32.2 km (20.0 mi) and a width of about 5.5 km (3.4 mi). The highest peak has an elevation of 2,511 m (8,238 ft) which is 1,353 m (4,439 ft) above the elevation of the dry Winnemucca Lake bed at about 1,158 m (3,799 ft).

The site of Nightingale and its large tungsten mine (abandoned in the 1950s) are at the southern end of the east slope. The area also has deposits of arsenic and antimony ore which were mined during World War I and World War II.

The Nightingale Mountains are named for Alanson W. Nightingill who was Captain of Company C during the 1860 Paiute War and later the first state controller of Nevada.
