= Fairview Range (Churchill County) =

Mountain range in Nevada, United States

- Location within Nevada

Highest point
- Elevation: 1,647 m (5,404 ft)

Geography
- Country: United States
- State: Nevada
- District: Churchill County
- Range coordinates: 39°10′48.730″N 118°12′22.464″W
- Topo map: USGS Bell Canyon

The Fairview Range is a mountain range in Churchill County, Nevada.
