= Black Canyon Range =

Mountain range in Nevada, United States

- Location within Nevada

Highest point
- Elevation: 2,012 m (6,601 ft)

Geography
- Country: United States
- State: Nevada
- District: Lincoln County
- Range coordinates: 37°50′27.868″N 114°37′40.996″W
- Topo map: USGS The Bluffs

The Black Canyon Range is a mountain range in Lincoln County, Nevada.
