= Peko Hills =

Mountain range in Elko County, Nevada, US

- Location within Nevada

Highest point
- Elevation: 1,799 m (5,902 ft)

Geography
- Country: United States
- State: Nevada
- District: Elko County
- Range coordinates: 41°7′18.709″N 115°25′35.224″W
- Topo map: USGS Morgan Hill

The Peko Hills are a mountain range in Elko County, Nevada.
