= East Pahranagat Range =

Mountain range in Nevada, United States

- Location within Nevada

Highest point
- Elevation: 1,918 m (6,293 ft)

Geography
- Country: United States
- State: Nevada
- District: Lincoln County
- Range coordinates: 37°17′58.860″N 115°13′54.069″W
- Topo map: USGS Alamo

The East Pahranagat Range is a Lincoln County, Nevada, mountain range in the Muddy River Watershed.
