= Hot Springs Range =

Mountain range in Nevada, United States

- Location within Nevada

Highest point
- Elevation: 1,799 m (5,902 ft)

Geography
- Country: United States
- State: Nevada
- District: Humboldt County
- Range coordinates: 41°16′18.639″N 117°25′27.440″W
- Topo map: USGS Hot Springs Peak

The Hot Springs Range is a mountain range in Humboldt County, Nevada.

The range was named on account of the hot springs in the area.
