= Desert Hills (Nevada) =

Mountain range in Nevada, United States

- Location within Nevada

Highest point
- Elevation: 1,542 m (5,059 ft)

Geography
- Country: United States
- State: Nevada
- District: Lincoln County
- Range coordinates: 37°2′29.861″N 115°21′18.068″W
- Topo map: USGS Desert Hills SE

The Desert Hills are a mountain range in Lincoln County, Nevada.
