= Huntoon Mountains =

Mountain range in Mineral County, Nevada, US

- Location within Nevada

Highest point
- Elevation: 2,406 m (7,894 ft)

Geography
- Country: United States
- State: Nevada
- District: Mineral County
- Range coordinates: 37°59′25.751″N 118°26′34.446″W
- Topo map: USGS Truman Meadows

The Huntoon Mountains are a mountain range in Mineral County, Nevada.
