= Dead Camel Mountains =

Mountain range in Nevada, United States

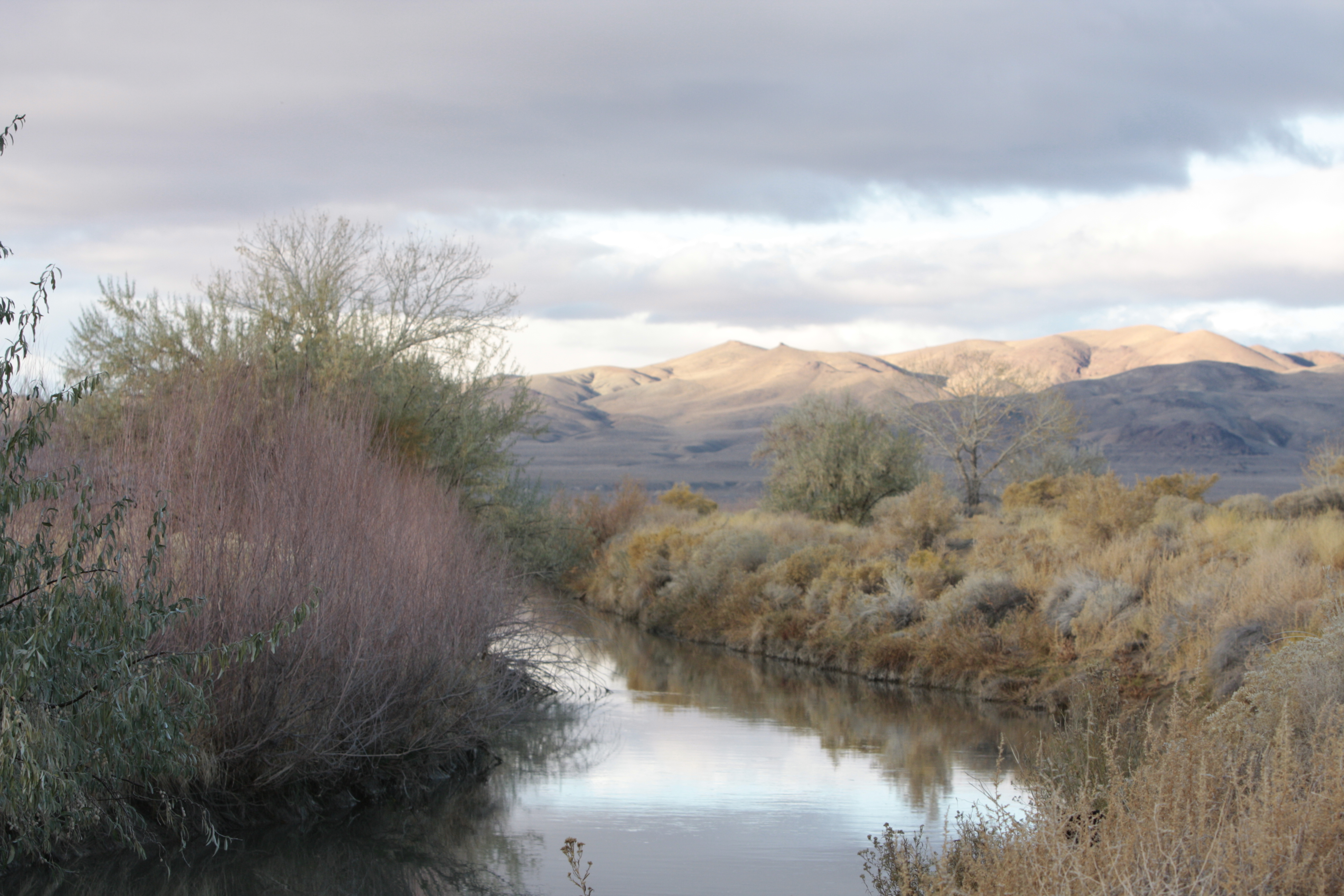
- Dead Camel Mountains

Highest point
- Elevation: 1,464 m (4,803 ft)

Geography
- Location within Nevada
- Country: United States
- State: Nevada
- District: Churchill County
- Range coordinates: 39°18′37.709″N 118°57′5.558″W
- Topo map: USGS Salt Cave

The Dead Camel Mountains are a mountain range located in western Nevada in the United States. They are rather unimposing, with a maximum elevation of 4,803 feet (1,464 m). The Dead Camel mountains separate the Lahontan Reservoir from Fallon, Nevada. There are several small caves on the eastern slope of the mountains, one of which contains many pictographs left by the inhabitants of the area at the time of Lake Lahontan. This area also has some interesting tufa formations.
