= Maverick Springs Range =

Mountain range in White Pine County, Nevada, US

- Location within Nevada

Highest point
- Elevation: 2,283 m (7,490 ft)

Geography
- Country: United States
- State: Nevada
- District: White Pine County
- Range coordinates: 40°3′17.751″N 115°19′41.145″W
- Topo map: USGS Ruby Lake SE

The Maverick Springs Range is a mountain range in White Pine County, Nevada.
