= Montezuma Range =

Mountain range in Esmeralda County, Nevada, US

- Location within Nevada

Highest point
- Elevation: 1,888 m (6,194 ft)

Geography
- Country: United States
- State: Nevada
- District: Esmeralda County
- Range coordinates: 37°38′47.755″N 117°22′23.297″W
- Topo map: USGS Montezuma Peak

The Montezuma Range is a mountain range in Esmeralda County, Nevada.
