= Truckee Range =

Mountain range in Nevada, United States

- Location within Nevada

Highest point
- Peak: Juniper Peak
- Elevation: 2,197 m (7,208 ft)
- Coordinates: 39°47′44″N 119°11′00″W

Geography
- Country: United States
- State: Nevada
- District(s): Churchill and Washoe counties
- Range coordinates: 39°47′52″N 119°11′03″W
- Topo map(s): USGS Reno, Nevada 30x60

The Truckee Range is a mountain range located in western Nevada in the United States. The border between Washoe County and Churchill County runs along the ridge. The ridge runs north–south for approximately 30 miles.

The Fernley Sink is to the south of the range. The Truckee River, from which the range takes its name, runs through the valley to the west of the range. Across that valley is the Pah Rah Range. Hot Springs Flat is to the east. To the north, Coyote Canyon separates the Truckee Range from the Nightingale Mountains.

The principal peaks in the Truckee Range (in order from north to south) are Black Warrior Peak at 6,338 feet (1,932 m), Juniper Peak 7,209 feet (2,197 m) and Two Tips 7,074 feet (2,156 m). Black Warrior Peak consists of a steep-sided round-topped peak set on top of a low ridge, which makes it dominate the eastern skyline in the southern Pyramid Lake area despite its relatively short height.

The Truckee Range is criss-crossed by old mining claims, although it currently has no active mines. Surface runoff from the slopes of this range which drain to the Truckee River has been analyzed by the United States Environmental Protection Agency using the DSSAM Model.
