= Ely Springs Range =

Mountain range in Nevada, United States

- Location within Nevada

Highest point
- Elevation: 2,047 m (6,716 ft)

Geography
- Country: United States
- State: Nevada
- District: Lincoln County
- Range coordinates: 37°56′37.864″N 114°40′18.004″W
- Topo map: USGS Ely Springs

Geology
- Rock age: Paleozoic Era
- Rock type: Dolomite

The Ely Springs Range is a mountain range located in Lincoln County, southeastern Nevada.

== See also ==
- Ely Springs Dolomite
- Mountain ranges of Nevada
