= Timpahute Range =

Mountain range in Nevada, United States

- Location within Nevada

Highest point
- Peak: Monte Mountain South
- Elevation: 2,427.7 m (7,965 ft)

Geography
- Country: United States
- State: Nevada
- District: Lincoln County
- Range coordinates: 37°38′33.836″N 115°31′40.108″W
- Topo map: USGS Monte Mountain

The Timpahute Range is a mountain range in Lincoln County, Nevada, United States. The highest point in the range is Monte Mountain South at 7,965 feet above sea level.
