= Trinity Range =

Mountain range in the state of Nevada

- Location within Nevada

Highest point
- Elevation: 2,071 m (6,795 ft)

Geography
- Country: United States
- State: Nevada
- District: Pershing County
- Range coordinates: 40°12′27.665″N 118°44′0.563″W
- Topo map: USGS Trinity Peak

The Trinity Range is a mountain range in Pershing County, Nevada.

Ragged Top Mountain is located in the Trinity Range.
