= Desert Mountains =

Mountain range in Nevada, U.S.

- Location within Nevada

Highest point
- Elevation: 6,711 ft (2,046 m)

Geography
- Country: United States
- State: Nevada
- District(s): Lyon and Churchill counties
- Range coordinates: 39°11′56″N 118°56′40″W
- Topo map: USGS Wild Horse Basin

The Desert Mountains are a mountain range located in west-central Nevada south of the Lahontan Reservoir and north of the town of Yerington. They are known as Pa'pa-dso-ki in the Goshiute dialect of Shoshoni. The range is located in Lyon and Churchill counties. The range includes Cleaver Peak, at 6,711 feet (2,046 m) above sea level in the western part of the range and Desert Peak, at 6,404 feet (1,952 m) in elevation, in the eastern part of the chain.
