= Burnt Springs Range =

Mountain range in Nevada, United States

- Location within Nevada

Highest point
- Elevation: 1,790 m (5,870 ft)

Geography
- Country: United States
- State: Nevada
- District: Lincoln County
- Range coordinates: 37°38′51.870″N 114°44′17.011″W
- Topo map: USGS Caliente NW

The Burnt Springs Range is a mountain range in Lincoln County, Nevada.
