= List of landforms of the Nellis & Wildlife 5 Ranges region =

A List of landforms of the Nellis & Wildlife 5 Ranges region.

The following ranges are:

- Desert National Wildlife Range
- National Wildhorse Management Area
- Air Force Test Flight Center – (Area 51 – Groom Lake, Nevada)
- Nellis Air Force Range
- Nevada Test Site

The five contiguous regions are located north and northwest of Las Vegas, Nevada. The Las Vegas Range of the Desert National Wildlife Range borders the north perimeter of North Las Vegas.

This list in incomplete; you can help by expanding it.

== List of landforms ==
=== Desert National Wildlife Range ===
Mountain Ranges

- Buried Hills
- Desert Range
- East Desert Range
- Las Vegas Range
- Ranger Mountains
- Sheep Range
- Spotted Range
- Pintwater Range

Other landforms

- Corn Creek Dunes
- Corn Creek Springs
- Desert Lake (Nevada)
- Dog Bone Lake
- Indian Springs Valley
- Three Lakes Valley (Nevada)

Associated:

- Indian Springs, Nevada
- Mercury, Nevada
- U.S. Route 93 in Nevada

=== Groom Lake, Nevada ===
- Emigrant Valley
- Groom Lake

Associated:

- Papoose Lake

=== National Wildhorse Management Area ===
- Belted Range
- Gold Reed (site)
- Kawich Valley
- Kawich Range

Associated:

- Cedar Pipeline Ranch
- Railroad Valley
- U.S. Route 93 in Nevada

=== Nellis Air Force Range ===
The Nellis Air Force Range contains all of the Desert National Wildlife Range, except in the entire east, the Sheep and Las Vegas Ranges, and Desert Lake.

Mountain ranges

- Belted Range
- Cactus Range
- Groom Range

Landforms

- Amargosa River-(headwaters)
- Antelope Lake, west Nye County
- Cactus Flat
- Emigrant Valley
- Gold Flat
- Mellan (site)
- Mud Lake, in Nye County
- Pahute Mesa
- Stonewall Mountain, western Nye County

Associated:

- Chispa Hills
- Goldfield, Nevada
- Ralston (site)
- Scotty's Junction, Nevada
- Stonewall Pass
- U.S. Route 93 in Nevada
- U.S. Route 95 in Nevada

=== Nevada Test Site ===
Mountain ranges

- Eleana Range
- Skull Mountain

Landforms

- Amargosa Desert
  - Amargosa Valley, Nevada
- Frenchman Lake
- South Silent Canyon

Associated:

- Mercury, Nevada
- Specter Range

== Mountain ranges inside the 5 regions ==
- Buried Hills
- Belted Range
- Cactus Range
- Desert Range
- East Desert Range
- Eleana Range
- Groom Range
- Kawich Range
- Las Vegas Range
- Ranger Mountains
- Sheep Range
- Spotted Range
- Pintwater Range

== See also ==
- Amargosa Desert
- Amargosa Valley
- Nellis - Wildlife five contiguous range region
- Desert National Wildlife Refuge Complex
