= List of valleys of Nevada =

This is a list of valleys of Nevada. Valleys are ordered alphabetically, by county. Dramatic parallelism is shown in the landforms of central and eastern Nevada. The most common valley name is Antelope Valley which is used for 5 different areas in Douglas, Elko/White Pine, Eureka, Lander, and Washoe Counties.

== Churchill County ==
- Carson Sink
- Copper Valley (Churchill-Pershing Counties)
- Dixie Valley (Churchill-Pershing Counties)
- Edwards Creek Valley
- Fairview Valley
- Granite Springs Valley (Churchill-Pershing Counties)
- Lahontan Valley
- North Valley
- Stingaree Valley
- Wyemaha Valley

== Clark County ==
- Bitter Spring Valley
- Cottonwood Valley
- Cottonwood Valley (Mojave Co., Arizona/Clark Co., Nevada)
- Dry Lake Valley
- Eldorado Valley
- Goodsprings Valley
- Green Valley
- Hidden Valley
- Indian Springs Valley (Nevada) (Clark-Lincoln Counties)
- Ivanpah Valley
- Las Vegas Valley
- Mercury Valley
- Moapa Valley
- Mohave Valley
- Pahrump Valley (Clark-Nye Counties)
- Paradise Valley (Clark County)
- Pinto Valley
- Piute Valley
- Spring Valley
- Three Lakes Valley (Clark-Lincoln Counties)
- Virgin Valley

== Douglas County ==
- Antelope Valley (Douglas County)
- Carson Valley
- Heavenly Valley North
- Jacks Valley
- Mineral Valley

== Elko County ==
- Antelope Valley (Elko-White Pine Counties)
- Butte Valley (Elko County)
- Clover Valley (Nevada)
- Duck Valley
- Goshute Valley
- Huntington Valley (Elko-White Pine Counties)
- Independence Valley (northwestern Elko County, Nevada)
- Independence Valley (eastern Elko County, Nevada)
- Lamoille Valley
- Pilot Creek Valley, (w Leppy Reservoir,
  (east, into Utah))
- Ruby Valley (Elko-White Pine Counties)
- Squaw Valley (Nevada)
- Starr Valley
- Steptoe Valley (Elko-White Pine Counties)
- Tecoma Valley (Nevada-Utah)
- Thousand Springs Valley

== Esmeralda County ==
- Big Smoky Valley (Esmeralda-Lander-Nye Counties)
- Cirac Valley
- Clayton Valley, (at Silver Peak, Nevada)
- Fish Lake Valley
- Lida Valley
- Monte Cristo Valley (Esmeralda-Mineral Counties)
- Montezuma Valley

== Eureka County ==
- Antelope Valley (Eureka County)
- Boulder Valley, (at Dunphy, Nevada)
- Crescent Valley
- Denay Valley
- Diamond Valley
- Fish Creek Valley (Eureka-White Pine Counties)
- Garden Valley (Eureka County)
- Grass Valley (Lander-Eureka Counties)
- Kobeh Valley
- Little Smoky Valley (Eureka-Nye-White Pine Counties)
- Pine Valley (Nevada), (at Cortez Mountains
  - Horse Creek Valley

== Humboldt County ==
- Bog Hot Valley
- Buffalo Valley (Humboldt-Lander-Pershing Counties)
- Desert Valley (Humboldt County)
- Eden Valley
- Grass Valley (Humboldt-Pershing Counties)
- Hualapai Flat
- Kings River Valley
- Paradise Valley (Humboldt County)
- Pueblo Valley
- Pumpernickel Valley
- Quinn River Valley
- Silver State Valley

== Lander County ==
- Antelope Valley (Lander County)
- Big Smoky Valley (Esmeralda-Lander-Nye Counties)
- Boulder Valley, (at Dunphy, Nevada) (Eureka-Lander Counties)
- Buffalo Valley (Humboldt-Lander-Pershing Counties)
- Carico Lake Valley
- Crescent Valley (Eureka-Lander Counties)
- Grass Valley (Eureka-Lander Counties)
- Monitor Valley (Lander-Nye Counties)
- Reese River Valley (Lander-Nye Counties)
- Smith Creek Valley

== Lincoln County ==
- Cave Valley (Nevada)
- Coal Valley
- Coyote Springs Valley
- Delamar Valley
- Desert Valley (Lincoln County)
- Dry Valley (Lincoln County)
- Dry Lake Valley
- Emigrant Valley
- Garden Valley
- Hamlin Valley
- Indian Springs Valley (Nevada) (Clark-Lincoln Counties)
- Kane Springs Valley
- Lake Valley (Nevada)
- Meadow Valley, (at Indian Cove, Nevada)
- Muleshoe Valley
- Pahranagat Valley
- Sand Spring Valley
- Spring Valley (White Pine County, Nevada) (White Pine-Lincoln Counties)
- Three Lakes Valley (Clark-Lincoln Counties)
- Tikaboo Valley
- Tule Desert (Nevada), (at Tule Springs Hills, Clover Mountains)
- White River Valley (Lincoln-Nye-White Pine Counties)

== Lyon County ==
- Adrian Valley
- Campbell Valley (Lyon-Mineral County)
- Churchill Valley
- Mason Valley
- Smith Valley (Lyon County)

== Mineral County ==
- Alkali Valley
- Aurora Valley
- Campbell Valley (Lyon-Mineral County)
- Gabbs Valley (Mineral-Nye Counties)
- Huntoon Valley
- Long Valley (Mineral County)
- Monte Cristo Valley (Esmeralda-Mineral Counties)
- Soda Springs Valley, (Luning, NV, Tonopah Junction, NV)
- Stewart Valley (Nevada)
- Queen Valley
- Walker Lake Valley
- Walker River Valley
- Win Wan Valley

== Nye County ==
- Amargosa Valley, Amargosa Valley, NV
- Big Sand Springs Valley
- Big Smoky Valley (Esmeralda-Lander-Nye Counties)
- Cactus Flat
- Coal Valley (Lincoln-Nye Counties)
- Duckwater Valley
- East Stone Cabin Valley
- Emigrant Valley
- Gabbs Valley (Mineral-Nye Counties)
- Garden Valley (Lincoln-Nye County)
- Hot Creek Valley
- Ione Valley
- Ivanpah Valley
- Kawich Valley
- Little Fish Lake Valley
- Little Smoky Valley (Eureka-Nye-White Pine Counties)
- Lodi Valley
- Mercury Valley
- Mid Valley
- Monitor Valley (Lander-Nye Counties)
- Monotony Valley
- Oasis Valley, (at Beatty, Nevada)
- Pahrump Valley (Clark-Nye Counties)
- Railroad Valley (Nye-White Pine Counties)
- Ralston Valley
- Reese River Valley (Lander-Nye Counties)
- Reveille Valley
- Rock Valley
- Sand Springs Valley
- Stewart Valley
- Stone Cabin Valley
- West Stone Cabin Valley
- White River Valley (Lincoln-Nye-White Pine Counties)

== Pershing County ==
- Buena Vista Valley
- Buffalo Valley (Lander-Humboldt-Pershing Counties)
- Desert Valley (Humboldt-Pershing Counties)
- Granite Springs Valley (Churchill-Pershing Counties)
- Grass Valley (Humboldt-Pershing Counties)
- Hualapai Flat
- Jersey Valley
- Kurniva Valley
- Lower Valley (Churchill-Pershing Counties)
- Pleasant Valley (Pershing County)
- Poito Valley
- Sage Valley
- Sage Hen Valley
- Upper Valley

== Washoe County ==
- Antelope Valley (Washoe County)
- Cold Springs Valley
- Dry Valley (Washoe County)
- Golden Valley
- Guano Valley
- Honey Lake Valley
- Hungry Valley
- Hualapai Flat
- Lemmon Valley
- Long Valley (Washoe County)
- Mosquito Valley
- Spanish Springs Valley
- Sun Valley
- Winnemucca Valley
- Washoe Valley (Nevada)

== White Pine County ==
- Antelope Valley (Elko-White Pine Counties)
- Butte Valley (White Pine County)
- Duck Creek Valley
- Huntington Valley (Elko-White Pine Counties)
- Jakes Valley
- Little Smoky Valley
- Long Valley (White Pine County)
- Newark Valley (Nevada)
- Pleasant Valley (White Pine County), (at Kern Mountains)
- Railroad Valley (Nye-White Pine Counties)
- Ruby Valley (Elko-White Pine Counties)
- Smith Valley (White Pine County)
- Snake Valley
- Spring Valley (White Pine County, Nevada)
- Steptoe Valley (Elko-White Pine Counties)
- White River Valley (Lincoln-Nye-White Pine Counties)

== See also ==
- List of mountain ranges of Nevada
