= James Taranik =

American scientist & educator (1940–2011)

James V. Taranik
- Born: April 23, 1940; Los Angeles, California
- Died: June 21, 2011 (aged 71)
- Education: Stanford University; Colorado School of Mines
- Spouse: Colleen Taranik
- Children: Dan Taranik, Debra Chittur
- Scientific career
- Fields: Geology, Remote sensing
- Workplaces: NASA; Mackay School of Mines; Desert Research Institute
- Thesis: Stratigraphic and Structural Evolution of Breckenridge Area, Central Colorado (1975)

James Vladimir Taranik (April 23, 1940 – June 21, 2011) was an American scientist and educator who worked in the area of earth-observation satellite remote sensing. He was Chief of NASA's Non-Renewable Resources Branch and Program Scientist of the Space Shuttle's first scientific flights with cargo that included experiments related to geology, atmospheric chemistry, meteorology, marine biology, and plant physiology in the earth and life sciences. He also held various positions in the Nevada System of Higher Education, including the Desert Research Institute and the Mackay School of Earth Sciences and Engineering.

== Early and personal life ==
Taranik graduated from Stanford University in 1962 with a B.S. in Geology, where he also earned a varsity letter as captain of the water polo team. He served as Staff Geologist for two years in 1966–1967 for the U.S. Army Engineer Command Headquarters in Vietnam, during which time he was awarded the Bronze Star Medal. In 1975, he received his Ph.D. in Geology from the Colorado School of Mines, for his geological mapping study, Stratigraphic and Structural Evolution of Breckenridge Area, Central Colorado.

He was the great-great-grandson of Sergeant Patrick Gass, an officer of the 1804-1806 Lewis and Clark Expedition, established to explore and map the newly acquired western half of the United States. Gass wrote the first printed journal of the expedition.

Taranik died just nine days before his planned retirement from his position as Director of the Mackay School of Earth Sciences and Engineering. He and his wife, Colleen, had two children, Dan and Debra, and three grandchildren.

== Career ==
Taranik's career began in 1971 at the Iowa Geological Survey, where he founded the Iowa Remote Sensing Laboratory. While in Iowa, he also taught at the University of Iowa, including pioneering aerospace remote sensing courses. He next served as Principal Remote Sensing Scientist at the EROS Data Center in Sioux Falls, South Dakota, under the auspices of the United States Geological Survey (USGS), from 1975 to 1979. In 1979, he became branch chief of the Non-Renewable Resources section at NASA headquarters in Washington, DC, where he managed NASA's programs for engineering development and flight of aerospace technology for solid earth applications. He was the Program Scientist for the first set of scientific instruments sent up on the Space Shuttle as cargo in 1981, having served in that role for both of the first two Space Shuttle launches. He was awarded NASA's Exceptional Scientific Achievement Medal in 1982.

He was dean of the Mackay School of Mines at the University of Nevada, Reno (UNR) from 1982–1987, during which time he also served as a full professor in UNR's Department of Geological Sciences. Taranik left UNR to become President of the Desert Research Institute — the environmental research arm of the Nevada System of Higher Education — from 1987–1998.

Taranik established the Strategic Materials Research, Education and Policy Center and the Cooperative Institute for Aerospace Science and Terrestrial Applications (CIASTA). He was Founding Program Director and Principal Investigator for the Nevada System of Higher Education NASA Space Grant Consortium and the NASA Experimental Program to Stimulate Competitive Research (EPSCoR). Taranik also served on the board of directors for Newmont Gold, and subsequently its affiliate Newmont Mining Corporation, from 1986 to 2010. He was an advocate for Newmont's expansion of its sustainability programs.

In 1987, he took on the role of President and CEO of the Desert Research Institute in Nevada, a statewide institute of the Nevada System of Higher Education devoted to cross-disciplinary environmental research. He would hold that position until 1998, when he retired as President Emeritus. As President, he refined DRI's mission for strategic and budgetary planning, created DRI Research Parks, and established new facilities for the Northern Nevada Science Center and the Southern Nevada Science Center. Under his leadership, the first Nevada Medal was awarded in 1988 to recognize exceptional scientific achievement. During this time, Taranik also served as a technical advisor to the Naval Research Laboratory's Hyperspectral Digital Imagery Collection Experiment (HYDICE).

In 1994, Taranik was a designee on the Pre-Launch Review Board for NASA's SIR-C/X-SAR missions. He was a Director of Earth Satellite Corporation (EarthSat) from 1997-2002.

In 1998, Taranik returned to the Mackay School of Mines to resume teaching and research activities as Regents Professor and Chair of the Arthur Brant Endowed Chair of Exploration Geophysics. In 2000, Taranik became the founding director of the Great Basin Center for Geothermal Energy and the Arthur Brant Laboratory for Exploration Geophysics at UNR. In 2003, as Acting Dean, he oversaw Mackay School of Mines's transition to the Mackay School of Earth Sciences and Engineering (MSESE). The following year, he became MSESE's first Director, a position he would hold until 2009, when he stepped down to focus on teaching as part of the Department of Geological Sciences and Engineering faculty.

== Professional associations and memberships ==
- American Association for the Advancement of Science
- American Association of Petroleum Geologists
- American Geological Institute
- American Geophysical Union
- American Institute for Aeronautics and Astronautics
- American Society for Photogrammetry and Remote Sensing
- Explorers Club
- Geological Society of America
- International Academy of Astronautics
- Society of Economic Geologists
- Society of Exploration Geophysicists

== Selected publications ==
Taranik, J.; Settle, M. (1981). "Space shuttle: A new era in terrestrial remote sensing". Science. 214 (4521): 619–626. doi:10.1126/science.214.4521.619. PMID 17839633. S2CID 30397869.

Settle, M.; Taranik, J. (1982). "Use of the space shuttle for remote sensing research: Recent results and future prospects". Science. 218 (4576): 993–995. doi:10.1126/science.218.4576.993. PMID 17790587. S2CID 33466855.

Taranik, J. (1982). "Geological remote sensing and space shuttle: A major breakthrough in mineral exploration technology". Mining Congress Journal. 68 (7): 18–23.
