= Dog Bone Lake =

Dog Bone Lake or Dogbone Lake may refer to:

- Dog Bone Lake (Nevada)
- Dogbone Lake (North Slope Borough, Alaska)
- Dogbone Lake (Kenai Peninsula Borough, Alaska)
