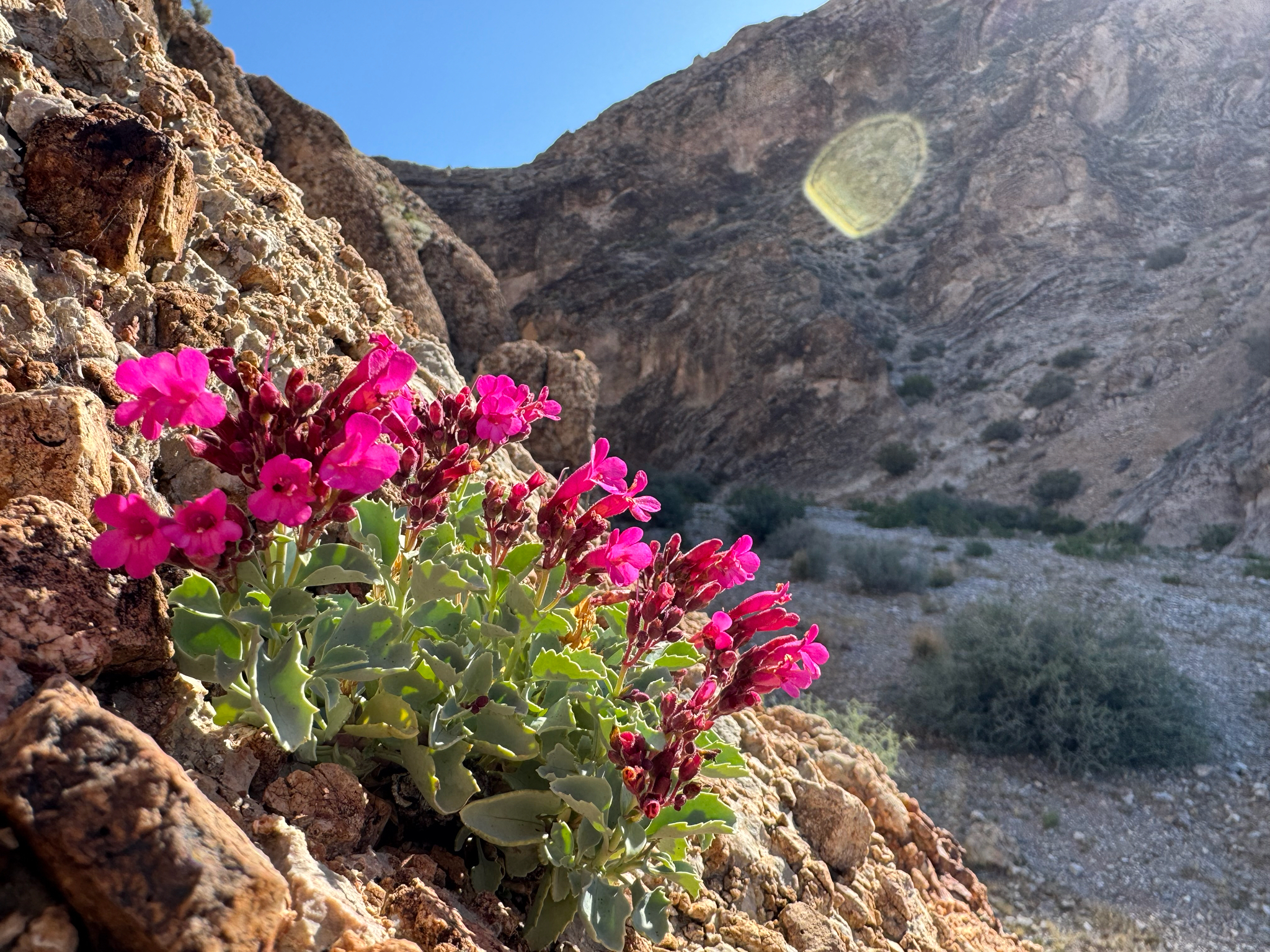
- Beaver Dam Wash National Conservation Area, Washington County, Utah

Conservation status
- Imperiled (NatureServe)

Scientific classification
- Kingdom: Plantae
- Clade: Embryophytes
- Clade: Tracheophytes
- Clade: Spermatophytes
- Clade: Angiosperms
- Clade: Eudicots
- Clade: Asterids
- Order: Lamiales
- Family: Plantaginaceae
- Genus: Penstemon
- Species: P. petiolatus

Binomial name
- Penstemon petiolatus Brandegee

= Penstemon petiolatus =

Plant species in the veronica family

Penstemon petiolatus, the crevice penstemon, is an evergreen plant with a somewhat shrubby character from the western US states of Nevada, Utah, and Arizona.

== Description ==
The crevice penstemon is a low growing shrub-like plant with evergreen leaves, typically growing 5 to 25 centimeters (2–10 in) tall but occasionally reaching as much as 40 cm (16 in), the width can be nearly 60 cm (24 in). The stems branch freely with a herbaceous character and are blue-green towards the ends and more woody with a rough texture and somewhat black in color towards the base.

The blue-green leaves are somewhat thick and sharply toothed, with the teeth ranging from symmetrical to somewhat asymmetrical and pointing forward. Each stem can have two to four leaf pairs and all the leaves fold inward along the primary vein. All but the uppermost pair of leaves are attached by petioles, short leaf stems. They are 1.4–3.5 centimeters (0.5–1.5 in) in length, though usually not longer than 3 cm (1 in), and 0.6 to 1.7 cm wide.

When blooming plants are generously covered in flowers that are magenta pink. Each flower is 1.3–1.7 centimeters long, marked with violet floral guide lines, and somewhat covered in glandular hairs on the outside. Inside the flower tube it has a small number of long, soft, off-white to pale yellow hairs on the lower surface. The staminode is covered in short yellow hairs and extends out of the flower's opening, slightly.

== Taxonomy ==
In 1899 botanist Townshend Stith Brandegee described a new species in the genus Penstemon which he named Penstemon petiolatus. Together with its genus it is classified in the Plantaginaceae family and the species has no varieties or botanical synonyms.

=== Names ===
The scientific name, petiolatus, is Botanical Latin describing the fact that its leaves have stems called petioles. Penstemon petiolatus is known by the common name crevice penstemon, but is also called the petiolate beardtongue.

== Range and habitat ==
Crevice penstemons are native to the states of Nevada, Arizona, and Utah. In Nevada they grow near Mount Charleston, in the Desert Range, and the Sheep Range in southern Nevada. In Arizona they are known from the Virgin Mountains and the Beaver Dam Mountains in both Arizona and southwestern Utah. They can be found at elevations of 1,000–1,700 meters (3,300–5,600 ft).

The species grows from cracks in limestone in the desert in areas of shadscale or blackbrush scrub as well as in the pinyon–juniper woodlands.
