= Jane Long (climatologist) =

American climatologist

Jane C. S. Long
- Education: Brown University (Sc.B.) University of California, Berkeley (M.S., Ph.D.)

Jane C. S. Long is an American energy and climate scientist. She was Associate Director at the Lawrence Livermore National Laboratory and is a fellow of the American Association for the Advancement of Science. She is known for being a climate strategist. As Associate Director for Energy and Environment Directorate at Livermore she led programs in Earth System Science and Engineering, Nuclear System Science and Engineering, National Atmospheric Release Advisory Center, and the Center for Accelerator Mass Spectrometry including disciplines ranging from Earth sciences.

== Career ==
- Principal Associate Director at Lawrence Livermore National Laboratory
- Co-Chair of the Task Force on Geoengineering UC Berkeley
- Co-chair of the 2011 California Council on Science and Technology for California's Energy Future Committee
- Co-chair of the National Commission on Energy Policies Task Force on Geoengineering
- Dean of the Mackay School of Mines at University of Nevada, Reno, Director of the Great Basin Center (1997-2003)
- Elected as an American Academy for the Advancement of Science Fellow 2012

== Summary ==
Dr. Jane Long retired from Lawrence Livermore National Laboratory (2012), where she worked as a top director and research fellow. She focused on global strategy, energy, and the environment. She is a contributing scientist for the Environmental Defense Fund while also serving as a visiting researcher at UC Berkeley.

She has led many big projects on energy and climate policy. She co-chaired studies on how California can meet its clean energy goals and worked on national and state panels about geoengineering and climate adaptation. She also advised the governor on climate issues.

Before that, she was the Dean of the Mackay School of Mines at the University of Nevada, Reno, and led the Great Basin Center for Geothermal Energy. She also chaired Nevada’s task force on renewable energy and efficiency.

At Livermore, she oversaw programs in Earth and nuclear sciences, climate studies, risk science, and accelerator mass spectrometry. Her work spans many areas, from energy solutions to environmental science, making her a well-known climate strategist.

== Life ==
Long received her bachelor's degree in biomedical engineering from the Brown University School of Engineering and her master's and doctorate from the University of California, Berkeley.

From 1997 to 2003 Long served as the dean of the Mackay School of Earth Sciences and Engineering at the University of Nevada, Reno.

Long is a senior fellow at the California Council on Science and Technology.

== Works ==
- Long, J. C. S.; Remer, J. S.; Wilson, C. R.; Witherspoon, P. A. (1982). "Porous media equivalents for networks of discontinuous fractures". Water Resources Research. 18 (3): 645–658. Bibcode:1982WRR....18..645L. doi:10.1029/WR018i003p00645. ISSN 1944-7973. S2CID 54945099.
- Endo, H. K.; Long, J. C. S.; Wilson, C. R.; Witherspoon, P. A. (1984). "A Model for Investigating Mechanical Transport in Fracture Networks". Water Resources Research. 20 (10): 1390–1400. Bibcode:1984WRR....20.1390E. doi:10.1029/WR020i010p01390. ISSN 1944-7973.
