= Great Basin (disambiguation) =

Great Basin may refer to:

== Places ==
- Great Artesian Basin (Australia), a source of inland freshwater
- Great Basin (Maine), a drainage basin in Piscataquis County, Maine
- Great Basin (western United States & Mexico), the largest North American endorheic watershed

Geographic areas associated with the Great Basin in western North America include:
- Great Basin Divide, the encompassing continental divide that demarcates the Great Basin from the Pacific watershed
- Great Basin Desert, a biologically defined desert
- Great Basin National Park, a protected area in White Pine County, Nevada
- Great Basin section, the physiographic region much smaller than the Great Basin but which extends into the Pacific watershed
- Indigenous peoples of the Great Basin area, the cultural range of historic indigenous people much larger than the Great Basin
- Ecological areas of the Great Basin:

- Great Basin floristic province, an area that contains similar flora
- Great Basin montane forest, a montane forest ecoregion defined by the World Wildlife Fund
- Great Basin shrub steppe, a sagebrush steppe WWF ecoregion

- Great Basin Highway, U.S. Route 93 in Nevada

== Fauna and flora ==
- Pinus longaeva (Great Basin Bristlecone Pine)
- Great Basin pocket mouse
- Great Basin rattlesnake
- Great Basin spadefoot
- Great Basin wildrye

== Other ==
- Journal of California and Great Basin Anthropology (Great Basin Anthropology), a topic of a regional journal published by the Malki Museum Press
- Great Basin Center for Geothermal Energy, a research organization of the University of Nevada
- Great Basin College, a state college at Elko, Nevada
