= Jane Long =

Jane Long may refer to:

- Jane Long (climatologist), American energy and climate scientist
- Jane Long (actress), 17th-century English actress
- Jane Herbert Wilkinson Long (1798–1880), Texas pioneer
