= Groom Mine =

Defunct mine in Lincoln County, Nevada

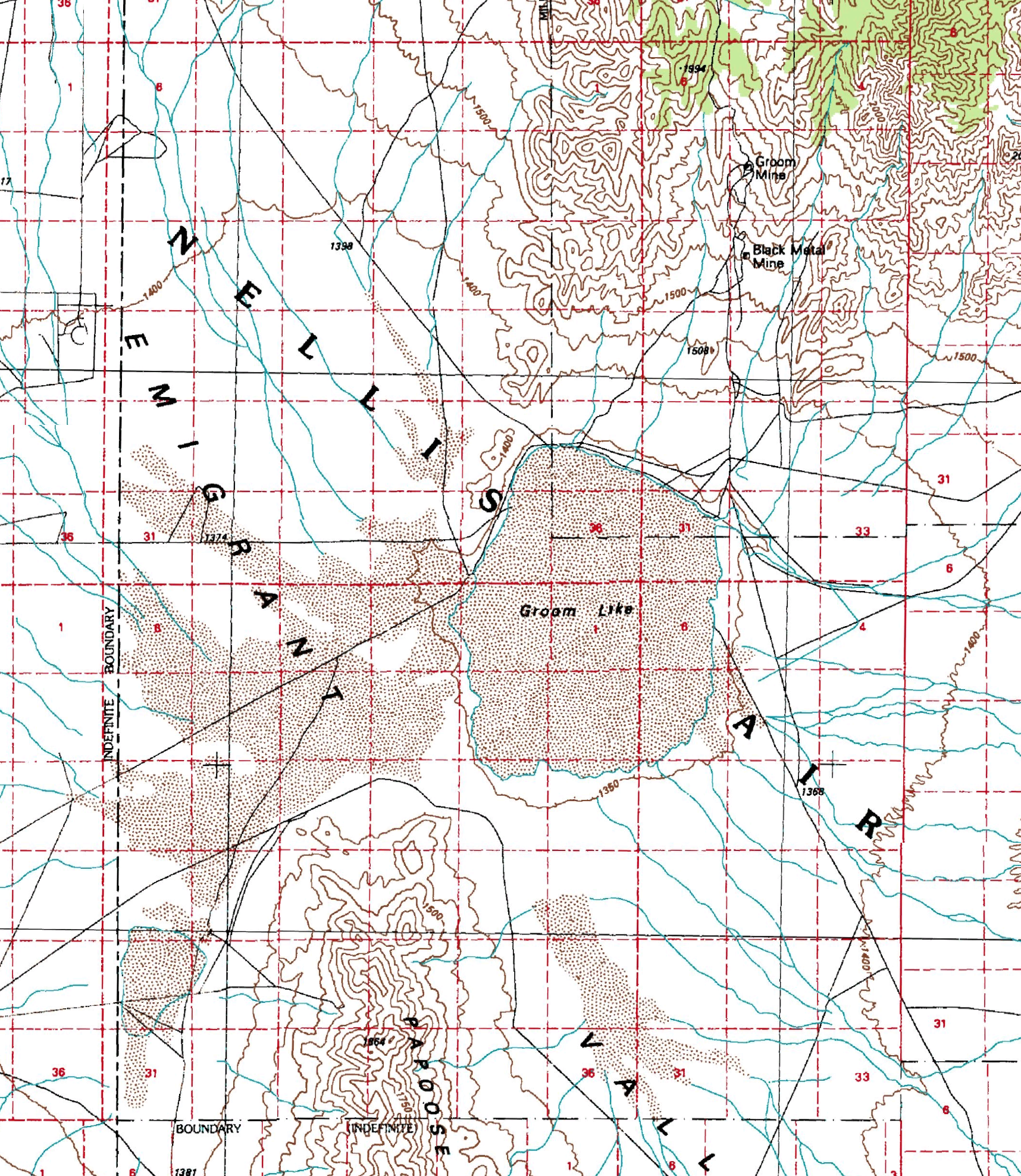
- United States Geological Survey map depicting the location of Groom Mine
- Interactive map of Groom Mine
- Location: Lincoln County, Nevada, 37.3462°N 115.7692°W
- Products: Silver
- Type: Open-pit & underground
- Greatest depth: 210 feet (64 m)
- Opened: 1866
- Active: 1872–1954
- Closed: 2015
- Company: United States Government
- Acquired: 2015

Groom Mine, located in Lincoln County, Nevada, first opened in the 1870s. Most mining in the area, mostly of silver chloride ores, had finished by 1874. Groom Mine continued to operate, finally ceasing operations in 1954. By 1956, official recordings of products of the Groom Mining District, which includes Groom Mine, shows that lead was the bulk of minerals harvested, which also included 145,000 troy ounces (4,500 kg) of silver and about 45 troy ounces (1.4 kg) of gold. During World War II, Groom Mine became surrounded by military activity, which continued into the 21st century. In the 1950s, the mine was exposed to fallout from nuclear testing that was being carried out at the Nevada Test Site. During the late 20th century, military activities, including the destruction of a mill and the restriction of access to the mine, continued to affect work there. The United States Government seized the mine under eminent domain from its previous owners in 2015. Just compensation was set at $1.204 million by the United States District Court, District of Nevada (Las Vegas), Judge Miranda Du presiding.

== Background ==
The rocks in the range date back to the Paleozoic era; the site is also covered by Tertiary rocks on its east and north sides. Prior to European exploration, the region was inhabited by Southern Paiute Native Americans. Following the discovery of minerals in the Comstock Lode in 1859, prospecting of other areas in Nevada began. Mining in the area began in the late 1860s, after minerals were discovered in the Groom Range in 1864. A mining district to organize claims, called Groom District, was formed in 1869. In 1871, the area was documented in the Wheeler Survey.

== History ==
=== Mining ===
Human habitation at the Groom Mine site may have begun as early as 1866. A patent for the Groom Mine was issued in 1872 and in 1885, the Sheahan family acquired the property. The mine was three days' travel from Indian Springs and 5,250 feet (1,600 m) above sea level, making it very isolated. According to Nevada Bureau of Mines and Geology in 1998, the property claim, which is commonly referred to as Groom, is officially named "Conception".

In addition to the Conception claim, other claims in Groom District were made and held by the Sheahan family. From 1915 until 1917, the mine was leased to Tom McCormick, who worked the mine. In September 1917, a miner from Austria-Hungary who was employed by Groom Mining Company died at the mine. In the mid-to-late 1910s the mine produced silver worth about $250,000. The shipping of mined products became difficult with the closing of the Las Vegas and Tonopah Railroad at the end of that decade, which caused the mine to become temporarily idle. By 1922, the mine had two shafts, the longest being 200 feet (61 m) deep.

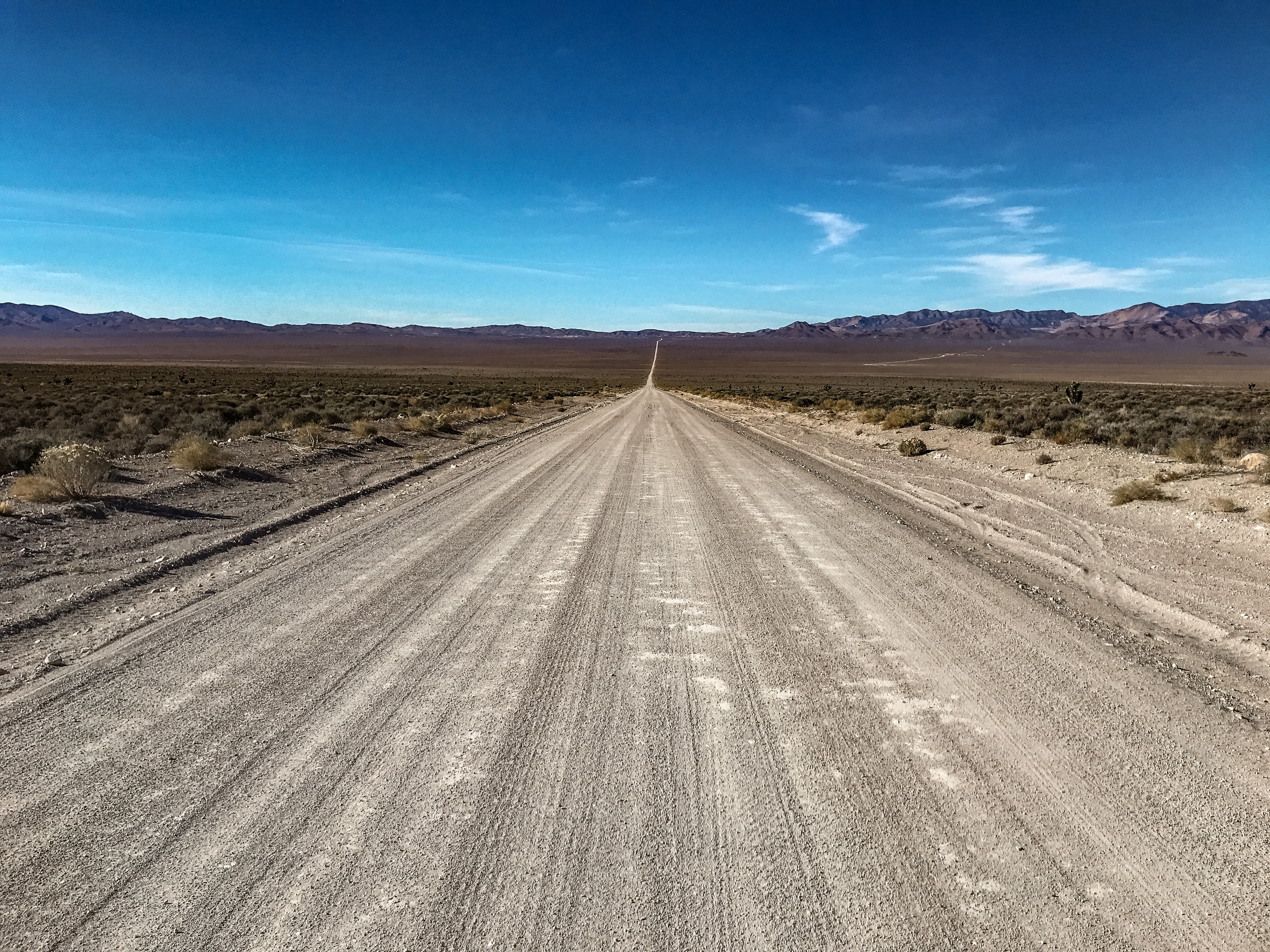
Groom Road, built by the Sheahan family and Lincoln County

In 1942, construction of a mill that used a gravity and flotation method began; a source later referred to this mill as a concentration mill. By 1951, four people were living at the mine and the concentration mill had been completed. Ore from Groom Mine, from which lead and silver were extracted, was found to contain cerussite and galena. Beginning in 1950, roads approaching the mine from the west were closed due to military activities, leading to the Sheahan family and Lincoln County to build a road from the east; this is referred to as Groom Road in a 1986 report. During the 1950s, mining operations paused due to nearby nuclear tests. In 1954, production from the mine ended due to the destruction of a mill at the mine.

Until 1956, the mine product totaled almost a million dollars in several minerals, including copper, silver, and gold; In 1977, the United States Bureau of Mines valued the output of Groom mine products at $3.75 million ($19.9 million in 2025). It was the most productive mine in the Groom Mining District and had been worked on by three generations of the Sheahan family. Based on panning samples near Groom Mine, the area may also contain deposits of antimony, barium, lead, mercury, and zinc. By 1959, the Sheahan family moved away from the mine but visited their property regularly. In 1984, the Sheahan family, who still owned the Groom Mine, also had the legal rights to most of the other 22 patented mining claims nearby. According to the Nevada Bureau of Mines and Geology, it was estimated in 1963 that there is 30,000 tonnes (30,000,000 kg) of material that can be mined at Groom Mine. A 1990 Bureau of Land Management report stated that due to restricted access to the mine, it would lead to "potential loss of income through inability to expand or further develop the claims". Until late 2015, the Sheahan family periodically blasted for minerals at the mine; by this time the family had owned the mine for 130 years.

=== Military interaction ===
In 1941, Groom Mine was visited by individuals who stayed at the mine with the Sheahan family while surveying the area for a gunnery and bombing range to be used during World War II. The outhouse and bunkhouse at the mine were accidentally strafed during the war by aircraft using the Las Vegas Bombing and Gunnery Range. Beginning in the 1950s, Groom Mine began to be impacted by nuclear tests at the Nevada Test Site; Groom Mine was 38 miles (61 km) away. In 1951, the Atomic Energy Commission informed the Sheahan family of the planned detonations and set up instrumentation at the mine. The instrumentation was monitored by an employee of the United States Public Health Service, who lived at the mine along with the Sheahan family. The first mention of a nuclear tests impacting operations at Groom Mine was the Operation Tumbler–Snapper Easy Test, which led to the mine being evacuated due to its proximity to the detonation. Following the detonation, measurements of radiation at the mine reached 0.19 roentgen per hour. It caused some structural damage, breaking the front door of the Sheahan's home. Further away, fallout impacted nearby Tempiute. Returning to the mine had to be done using a different route; the normal route was too radioactive to travel on. The following Fox test in late May 1952 led to fallout falling on the mine; the highest-recorded radiation was 0.32 roentgen per hour. It was, however, the view of the Atomic Energy Commission that the nuclear detonations "had not subjected Groom Mine personnel to any real danger from fallout".

By May 1952, most of the Sheahan family had evacuated the mine and moved to Las Vegas. In July 1952, Martha, a member of the family who had been exposed to fallout, was diagnosed with cancer. Following Operation Upshot–Knothole, the Sheahan family attempted to sell their claim to the Atomic Energy Commission but it refused, fearing it would set a precedent; instead the family received $1,100 for losses and damages resulting from the Operation Tumbler-Snapper tests. Following the adverse environmental impact observed by the two remaining family members at the mine caused by Upshot-Knothole Harry, the Atomic Energy Commission said the blasts were designed to produce winds from the testing area towards Groom rather than towards Las Vegas.

During 1953, the property was strafed and during the summer a bomb destroyed the mine's mill; no specific claim was made by the Sheahan family against the United States Air Force (USAF) for the event. In 1954, the mining buildings were strafed by aircraft using Nellis Air Force Gunnery and Bombing Range. In 1956, the Sheahan family and others filed lawsuits against the Atomic Energy Commission because of damage caused by nuclear testing. In 1959, the lawsuit was withdrawn when the Sheahan family ran out of funds to continue legal action. The property on which the mine is located has a view of an airfield known as Area 51. In the 1970s and 1980s, armed personnel arrived when the Sheahan family came onto their property, sometimes locking them into their own buildings.

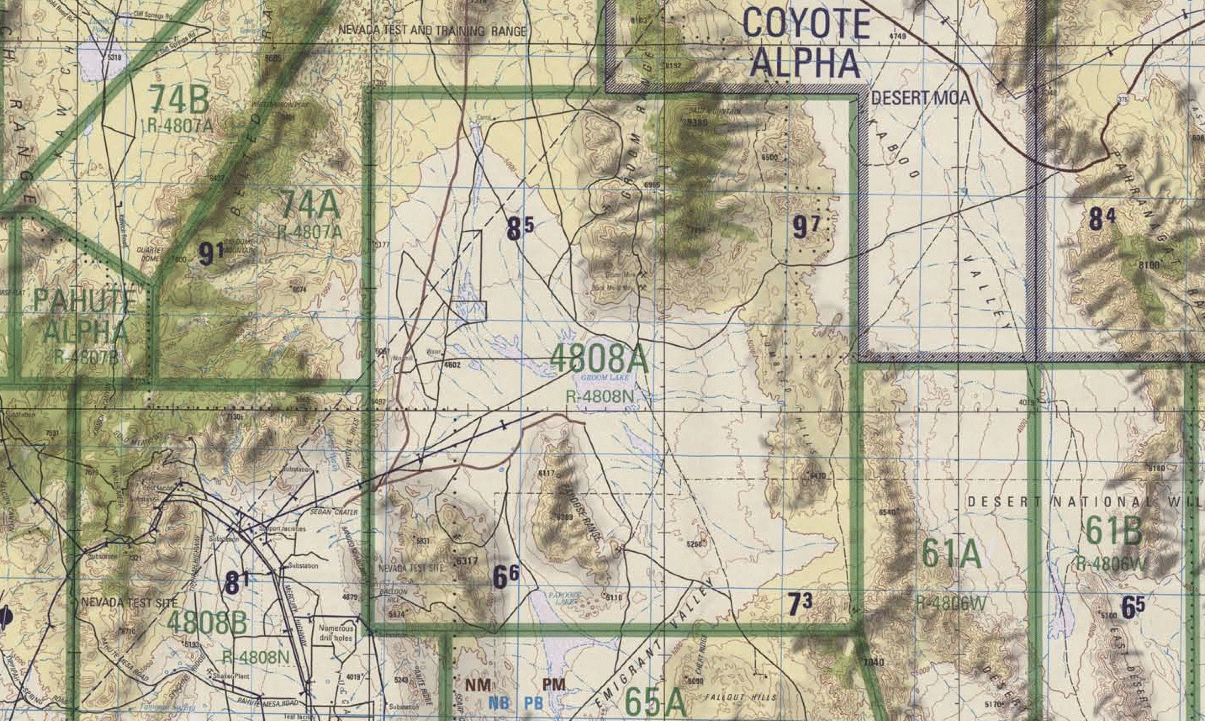
Groom Mine is depicted on a chart of the Nevada Test and Training Range made in 2008.

In 1984, the USAF seized lands around Groom Mine, restricting access to the mine for the Sheahan family. Some of the Sheahan family were issued with security clearances after 1984. In 1986, the 1953 mill-destruction event was entered into the record of a subcommittee of the United States House Committee on Natural Resources. In 1987, the position of the United States Air Force was, "we don't want to go in and tell them to get the hell out". In 1989, although it was within the Nevada Test and Training Range, the United States Air Force allowed claimants access to their claims within the Groom Mining District, including Groom Mine.

=== Government ownership ===
Beginning in late 2014, the United States Department of Defense attempted to purchase the property from the Sheahan family, originally offering $1.5 million. By August 2015, the USAF had raised the offer to $5.2 million; the family continued rejecting the offers. In August 2015, a government press release described the mine as a "safety and security risk", even though the Sheahan family had not disclosed any activities of the Groom Lake facility. In September 2015, the commander of the Nevada Test and Training Range stated that the existence of the mine within the range led to "tremendous expense" due to "canceling missions when they came out"; secret operations at the base could not proceed when civilians were present on the Sheahan's property within easy view of the installation. On 16 September 2015, the property was condemned under eminent domain and given to the United States Government by a court order signed by federal Judge Miranda Du.

It was not determined at the time of transfer of ownership how much the Sheahan family would receive in just compensation for the government acquisition of Groom Mine; the USAF in 2015 estimated the land to be worth $1.2 million. In November 2015, the Sheahan family suggested the mine be protected as a national historic site; this coincides with a suggestion in a 1980s USAF report that recommended nominating Groom Mining District to be listed on the National Register of Historic Places. By 2016, the USAF only valued Groom Mine at under a third of a million dollars; the Sheahan family's legal counsel valued the property as being worth over $100 million. In 2017, the family claimed they were forced to leave millions of dollars' worth of property at Groom Mine following the seizure; part of the property which was abandoned includes an antique anvil that was missing when personal property was reviewed in November 2015. In August 2019, it was reported that the family was hoping to have a jury trial to determine the value of the property. The trial was ultimately conducted in front of a three-member Land Commission. Prior to trial, the landowners accepted the Government's valuation of the mineral interests at $104,000 and went to trial only to contest the value of the surface rights. The landowner's experts valued those rights at $50 million based on the property being developed into a commercial tourism enterprise offering views of Area 51. The Government's experts valued it at $254,000 based on continued use as a rural recreation retreat. On May 29, 2020 the Land Commission ruled that just compensation for the taking of the surface rights is $1,100,000 based on the property's continued use for rural recreation, with a premium over the Government's valuation to account for its view of Area 51 and its historic use as a family owned mining operation.

== See also ==
- Tikaboo Peak
