= The Nevada Sagebrush =

Independent student newspaper of the University of Nevada, Reno

- Type: Student newspaper
- Format: Broadsheet
- Publisher: Associated Students of the University of Nevada
- Editor: James Wolfgang Perez (2026–present)
- Founded: October 19, 1893; 132 years ago
- Language: English
- Headquarters: Reno, Nevada, U.S.
- Website: Official website

The Nevada Sagebrush is the independent student newspaper of the University of Nevada, Reno. It was founded on October 19, 1893, as The Student Record, against the wishes of the Nevada Board of Regents. In 1910, the name was changed to The Sagebrush and then in 2004, to The Nevada Sagebrush. The newspaper currently releases a digital issue at the end of every month and employs about 10 Nevada students. All six of the university's Pulitzer Prize winners had bylines in The Nevada Sagebrush and five served as staff writers.

== Sections ==
The Nevada Sagebrush is split into five sections:

- News – The news section covers both on- and off-campus news.
- Sports – The sports section with a focus on the Nevada Wolf Pack.
- Arts & Entertainment – The section contains reviews of movies and music and features on cultural trends.
- Opinion – The editorial section.
- Multimedia – The section for developing stand alone and complementary content for the Nevada Sagebrush socials.

== Notable alumni ==
- Sig Rogich
- Geoff Schumacher

== Awards ==
The Nevada Sagebrush won the 2007–08, 2008–09, 2011–12 and most recently, 2014–15 Pacemaker Award for student journalism. It was also a finalist for a Pacemaker at the 2006, 2007 and 2015 ACP student journalism awards. It has won the best of show award at the fall 2005, 2006, 2007 and 2008 ACP national conferences in its category (weekly broadsheet at a four-year university). The website won an ACP Online Pacemaker for the first time in 2011. It was also nominated for an online ACP Pacemaker in 2008. The paper also won an award for “Best Editorial Writing” in 1986 from the Nevada State Press Association.

== Former editors ==
- 1893–1894: Charles Magill
- 1894–1895: F.H. Saxton
- 1895–1896: O.T. Williams / J. L. M. Henry
- 1896–1897: G. R. Bliss
- 1897–1898: J. J. Sullivan
- 1898–1899: H. H. Dexter
- 1899–1900: A. M. Smith
- 1900–1901: F. A. Bonham
- 1901–1902: George Springmeyer
- 1902–1903: Bernard O'Hara / J. V. Comerford
- 1903–1904: J. V. Comerford
- 1904–1905: C. C. Smith / John S. Case / D.M. McDonald
- 1905–1906: D. M. McDonald / John P. Arnot
- 1906–1907: Silas E. Ross
- 1907–1908: Elmer A. Porter / S. L. Netherton / Silas E. Ross
- 1908–1909: Silas E. Ross
- 1909–1910: Stanley M. Wilton / August Holmes
- 1910–1911: August Holmes / Lloyd B. Patrick
- 1911–1912: Chester M. Ogden
- 1912–1913: Robert P. Farrar
- 1913–1914: Robert P. Farrar
- 1914–1915: Louis J. Sommers
- 1915–1916: Bourke Healey
- 1916–1917: John Heard
- 1917–1918: Lyle Kimmel
- 1918–1919: George Hopkins
- 1919–1920: R. P. Bryan
- 1920–1921: John R Bryan
- 1921–1922: Leslie M. Bruce
- 1922–1923: John R. Ross
- 1923–1924: Paul Harwood
- 1924–1925: Walker G. Matheson
- 1925–1926: W. H. Buntin
- 1926–1927: Ernest L. Inwood
- 1927–1928: Fred M. Anderson
- 1928–1929: Allen R. Crawford
- 1929–1930: James Hammond
- 1930–1931: Harvey Dondero
- 1931–1932: Joe Jackson
- 1932–1933: Kenneth F. Johnson
- 1933–1934: William F. McMenamin
- 1934–1935: Forrest M. Bibb
- 1935–1936: Frank Sullivan
- 1936–1937: John Carr
- 1937–1938: John Brackett
- 1938–1939: Don Kinkle
- 1939–1940: Clarence Heckethom
- 1940–1941: Frank McCulloch
- 1941–1942: Byrn Armstrong
- 1942–1943: BtlJFrlel / Jack Fleming
- 1943–1944: Jack Fleming / Melba Whitaker / Betty Molignoni
- 1944–1945: Betty Molignoni
- 1945–1946: Madeline Maestretti
- 1946–1947: Bill Henley / Lloyd Rogers
- 1947–1948: Gene Evans
- 1948–1949: Jonnie Milburn
- 1949–1950: Gene McKenna
- 1950–1951: Mark Curtis
- 1951–1952: Frank Johnson / Joseph Abbott
- 1952–1953: Joseph Abbott
- 1953–1954: Rosemary Cochran / William Eaton
- 1954–1955: William Eaton / Paul Finch
- 1955–1956: Paul Finch / Ken Robbins
- 1956–1957: Bruce Bledsoe
- 1957–1958: Jim Joyce
- 1958–1959: Dewey Berscheid
- 1959–1960: Warren Lerude
- 1960–1961: Donald O'Donnel / Marybeth Varcados / Don Graydon
- 1961–1962: Toddene Watkins
- 1962–1963: Doug Buchanan
- 1963–1964: Patricia Rogero
- 1964–1965: Mike Sloan / Linda Chambers
- 1965–1966: Sig Rogich
- 1966–1967: Hampton Young
- 1967–1968: George Frank
- 1968–1969: Tim Countis
- 1969–1970: Tom Wixon / Mike Cuno
- 1970–1971: Sheila Caudle
- 1971–1972: Mike Graham
- 1972–1973: Buddy Frank
- 1973–1974: Kelsie Harder
- 1974–1975: Kelsie Harder
- 1975–1976: Bob Anderson
- 1976–1977: Gary Jesch / Bill Becker / Laura Hinton
- 1977–1978: Laura Hinton / Steve Falcone
- 1978–1979: Steve Martarano
- 1979–1980: Ruth Mills
- 1980–1981: K. J. Evans / John Roll
- 1981–1982: Charles Morse Jr.
- 1982–1983: Carol Zanetti
- 1983–1984: Lauren Belaustegui
- 1984–1985: Steve Ball
- 1985–1986: Guy Clifton
- 1986–1987: Mike Sullivan
- 1987–1988: Geoff Schumacher
- 1988–1989: Bryan Allison
- 1989–1990: Kristine Kaiser
- 1990–1991: Dan Hinxman
- 1991–1992: Rachael Conlin
- 1992–1993: Marcel Levy
- 1993–1994: Tina Crinite
- 1994–1995: James Welborn / Martha Bellisle
- 1996–1997: John Curtis
- 1997–1998: Jace Radke
- 1998–1999: Brock Radke
- 1999–2000: Adrienne Rice
- 2000–2001: Alexandra Crocket
- 2001–2002: Benjamin Larson
- 2002–2003: Jeremy Dutton
- 2003–2004: Dylan Shaver
- 2004–2005: Alex Newman
- 2005–2007: Annie Flanzraich
- 2007–2008: Brian Duggan
- 2008–2009: Nick Coltrain
- 2009–2011: Jessica Fryman
- 2011–2012: Juan López
- 2012–2013: Ben Miller
- 2013–2014: Megan Ortiz / Chris Boline
- 2014–2015: Chris Boline
- 2015–2016: Terrance Bynum
- 2016–2018: Jacob Solis
- 2018–2019: Madeline Purdue
- 2019–2021: Olivia Ali
- 2021–2022: Andrew Mendez
- 2022—2024: Emerson Drewes
- 2024–2025: Derek Raridon
- 2025–2026: Kelsea Frobes
- 2026—Present: James Wolfgang Perez
