= Kawich Range =

Mountain range in Nevada, United States

- Location within Nevada

Highest point
- Peak: Kawich Peak
- Elevation: 9,401 ft (2,865 m)
- Coordinates: 37°58′N 116°28′W

Geography
- Country: United States
- State: Nevada
- District: Nye County

The Kawich Range is a mountain range in Nye County of southern Nevada in the United States, just south of the Hot Creek Range. The southern part of the range lies on the Nellis Air Force Range. The mountains cover an area of about 250 square miles (650 km^{2}) and contain Kawich Peak, at 9,399 feet (2,865 m) above sea level. U.S. Route 6 crosses the pass between The Kawich and the Hot Creek ranges and meets State Route 375 at Warm Springs just north of the range. To the east lies the Reveille and Kawich valleys with the Reveille Range to the east of the northern portion and the Belted Range east of Quartzite Mountain at the southern end. The broad Pahute Mesa and Gold Flat lie to the south with Cactus Flat and the Cactus Range to the southwest. To the northwest across Stone Cabin Valley lies the Monitor Range.

The Bureau of Land Management manages 50.3% of the mountains, and 39.7% is part of the Air Force Range. A USFWS National Wildlife Refuge makes up 8.9% of the range.

Vegetation is primarily sagebrush scrub and piñon-juniper. The Kawich Range beardtongue (Penstemon pudicus) is a rare plant that is endemic to the range. The mountains are home to porcupines and several species of mice, and chipmunks, voles, squirrels, and gophers can also be found. American kestrels, MacGillivray's warbler, Bullock's oriole, and hairy woodpeckers also inhabit the Kawich Range.

Kawich Range was named after an Indian chieftain.
