= Hidden Forest Cabin =

- U.S. National Register of Historic Places
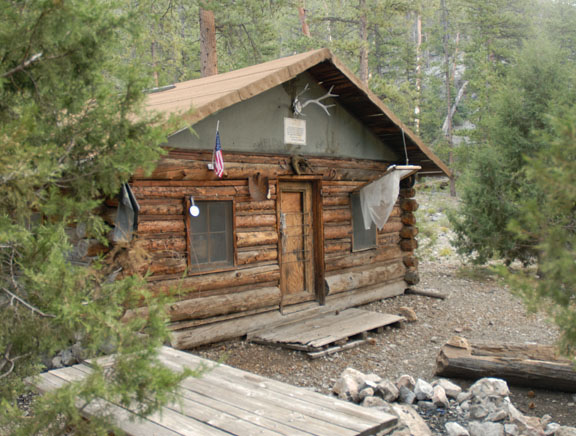
- Hidden Forest Cabin

- Location within Nevada Location within the United States
- Nearest city: Las Vegas, Nevada
- Coordinates: 36°37′54.31″N 115°13′5.12″W
- NRHP reference No.: 75001106
- Added to NRHP: February 20, 1975

The Hidden Forest Cabin is an old game warden's dwelling in Clark County, Nevada, United States in the Desert National Wildlife Refuge. It is located on Hidden Forest Road, in the Hidden Forest in the Sheep Range along the route to Hayford Peak.

== History ==
The Hidden Forest Cabin was initially thought to have been built in the 1880s, but in 2020, it was confirmed that the cabin was built in 1931 by World War I veteran Clarence Russell as a personal isolated dwelling. The cabin remained as his home until next year on June 17, 1932 when Russell headed to another cabin in the area at White Rock Canyon belonging to C. P. Moore in his car after previously consuming alcohol that day. Drunk, Russell confronted him and shot him dead with a single bullet between the eyes, with his motive likely being his resent for Moore locating his cabin within a close proximity to his own on the other side of Hayford Peak. After killing Moore, Russell was shot twice with his own pistol by Moore's son, then tied up and brought to authorities in Las Vegas. Russell then died of his wounds and Moore's son said that he fired in self defense.

The cabin remained vacant for six years until becoming a game warden's cabin in 1938 after the Desert National Wildlife Refuge was formed two years earlier in 1936. In the following decades, it has been sporadically maintained by Boy Scout troops and campers.

The cabin was added to the National Register of Historic Places on February 20, 1975.

In around 2008 to 2010, the cabin was renovated in collaboration with the Scout troops and it now acts as a first-come, first-served retreat for hikers. Today, vehicle traffic to the cabin is prohibited, but it is a popular hike.
