= Quartz Peak =

Mountain in Nevada, United States

Coordinates: 36°55′44″N 115°33′34″W

Quartz Peak is a summit in Lincoln County in the U.S. state of Nevada. The elevation is 6,247 feet (1,904 m).

Quarts Peak is part of Pintwater Range

Quartz Peak was named for deposits of quartz.
