= Kawich Peak =

Mountain in Nevada, United States of America

- Location within Nevada

Highest point
- Elevation: 9,401 ft (2,865 m) NAVD 88
- Prominence: 3,121 ft (951 m)
- Coordinates: 37°57′43″N 116°27′40″W

Geography
- Location: Nye County, Nevada, U.S.
- Parent range: Kawich Range

Kawich Peak is a mountain located in central Nye County, Nevada, United States. With an elevation of 9,401 feet (2,865 m), it is the highest mountain in the Kawich Range. It is also the 16th most isolated peak in Nevada.
