= College of Liberal Arts at the University of Nevada =

College at the University of Nevada

Coordinates: 36°6.16′N 115°8.51′W

College of Liberal Arts is the humanities and social sciences college at the University of Nevada. The Nevada School of the Arts and the School of Social Research and Justice Studies are located in the college. It was founded in 2004.

CLA contains fourteen departments and six programs and centers. More than half of all University of Nevada undergraduates enroll in CLA courses each semester. The College of Liberal Arts has over 200 full-time faculty and 44 support staff members.

== Departments, programs and centers ==
Departments:

- Anthropology
- Art
- Communication Studies
- Criminal Justice
- English
- Gender, Race and Identity
- History
- Military Science
- Music
- Philosophy
- Political Science
- Sociology
- Theatre and Dance
- World languages and Literatures

Programs and centers:

- Center for Basque Studies
- Core Humanities Program
- Grant Sawyer Center for Justice Studies
- International Affairs Program
- Latino Research Center
- Oral History Program
