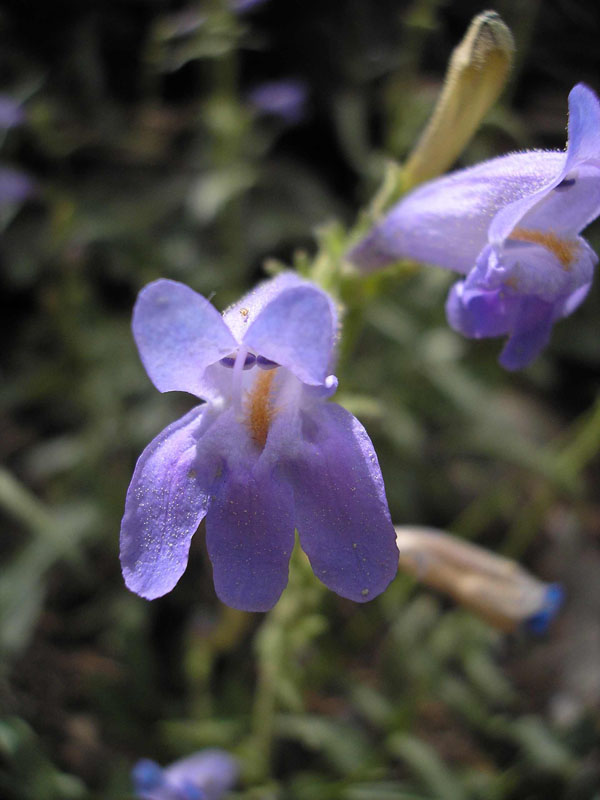

Conservation status
- Critically Imperiled (NatureServe)

Scientific classification
- Kingdom: Plantae
- Clade: Tracheophytes
- Clade: Angiosperms
- Clade: Eudicots
- Clade: Asterids
- Order: Lamiales
- Family: Plantaginaceae
- Genus: Penstemon
- Species: P. pudicus

Binomial name
- Penstemon pudicus Reveal & Beatley

= Penstemon pudicus =

Species of flowering plant

Penstemon pudicus is a rare species of flowering plant in the plantain family known by the common names bashful beardtongue and Kawich Range beardtongue. It is endemic to Nevada in the United States, where it is known only from the Kawich Range in Nye County.

This perennial herb grows up to 50 centimeters tall and bears purple-blue flowers in June and July.

The plant grows in pinyon-juniper woodland habitat in rocky soils and outcrops.

There are only about 6 known occurrences of this plant, all in the Kawich Mountains of central Nevada. While it may be locally abundant in its limited range, there are probably no more than about 1000 individuals in total.
