= Cirac Valley =

Valley in Nevada, United States

Coordinates: 38.2497°N 117.5878°W

Cirac Valley is located in the Battle Mountain District in Esmeralda County, Nevada. It covers a land area of 23,940 acres.

== Geography ==
The area is located west of the Royston hills, east of the Cedar Mountains, and 30 miles northwest away from Tonopah. The valley is managed by the Bureau of Land Management's Battle Mountain District Office.

Rhyolite exposures can be found on the west part of the area, as well as summits and a rock canyon system. The valley's elevation ranges between 3550 feet and 6300 feet. Outlaw Springs is found in the west part of the unit. They provide enough water for wildlife to thrive in the area.

=== Flora and Fauna ===
The geographical area mainly moderated by natural wild forces and is characterized by plants such as blackbrush, cholla, and saltbrush.

The eastern parts of the area are characterized with a sandy soil which predisposes the growth of greasewood. Bighorn sheep can be found near the borders of the Cedar mountain. Wild horses, pronghorn and burros are also frequent in the area.

=== Stargazing ===
The valley is far from towns and city lights, which makes it a good spot for star gazing at night.
