= Geoff Schumacher =

American journalist

Geoff Schumacher (born November 11, 1965) is a journalist and author who lives in Las Vegas, Nevada. He is the author of two books focusing on the history of Las Vegas.

== Early life ==
Schumacher, who was born in Madison, Wisconsin, moved when he was 11 to Las Vegas. He graduated from Pahrump Valley High School in 1984, and received his bachelor's degree in journalism in 1988 from the University of Nevada, Reno. He edited the college newspaper, Sagebrush, his senior year.

== Career ==
After graduation, Schumacher worked as a reporter and then as city editor at Las Vegas Sun. He then worked for three years as managing editor of Las Vegas CityLife, an alternative newsweekly. In 2000, he went to work for Stephens Media, where he launched the now-defunct Las Vegas Mercury, an alt-weekly, which published for four years until it folded after Stephens Media bought rival Las Vegas CityLife. Schumacher wrote a weekly column for the Review-Journal beginning in January 2006. In May 2008, he was named publisher of CityLife.

In 2014, Schumacher began working for the Mob Museum in Las Vegas.

== Books ==
- Schumacher, Geoff (2004). Sun, Sin And Suburbia: An Essential History Of Modern Las Vegas. Las Vegas: Stephens Press. p. 272. ISBN 978-1-932173-14-7.
- Schumacher, Geoff (2008). Howard Hughes: Power, Paranoia & Palace Intrigue. Las Vegas: Stephens Press. p. 298. ISBN 978-1-932173-59-8.
- Schumacher, Geoff (2014). Nevada: 150 Years in the Silver State. Las Vegas: Stephens Press. p. 256. ISBN 978-1935043775.
