= Nevada Bureau of Mines and Geology =

University of Nevada research and public service unit

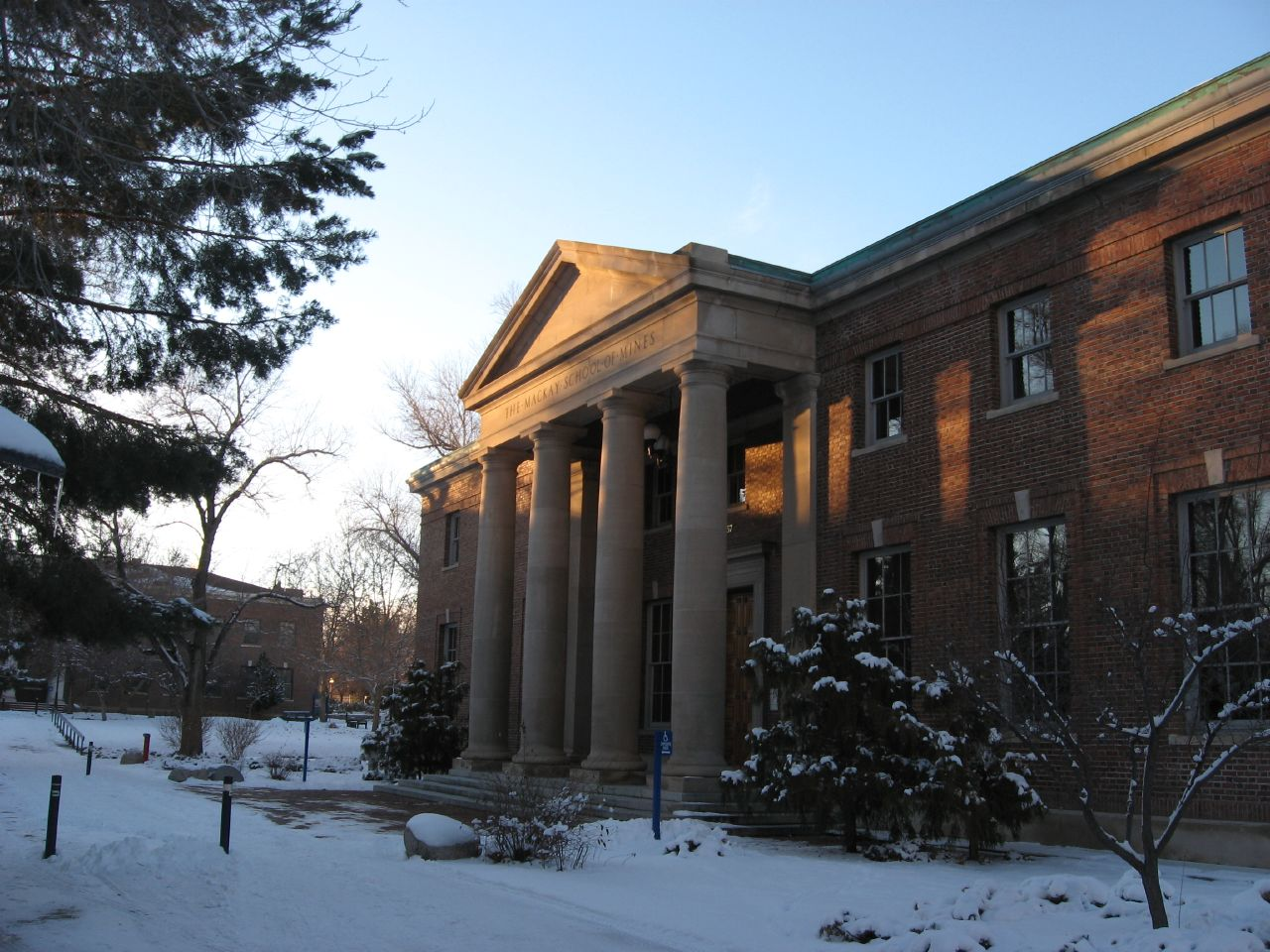
Mackay School of Mines Building, University of Nevada

The Nevada Bureau of Mines and Geology (NBMG) is a research and public service unit of the University of Nevada and the State Geological Survey. NBMG is also part of the Mackay School of Earth Sciences and Engineering at the University of Nevada in Reno. Scientists with the NBMG conduct research and publish their findings around topics which include, mineral and energy resources, engineering geology, environmental geology, earthquakes, groundwater, and geologic mapping in Nevada. In addition, the NBMG provides special services in the field of analytical geochemistry and assay standards, mineral and rock identification. The NBMG provides earth-science education and in-service teacher training and continuing education for professional geoscientists, geologic and geotechnical information.
