= Hualapai Flat =

Valley in Nevada, United States

Coordinates: 40°52′28″N 119°18′1″W

Hualapai Flat (pronounced "wall-a-pie") is a valley in northwestern Nevada, United States, located northwest of the Black Rock Desert. The two valleys are separated by the Calico Hills. The Granite Range marks the southern and western edges of Hualapai Flat. To the north the valley is constrained by the Granite Range and the Calico Hills. Washoe, Pershing, and Humboldt counties meet in the Hualapai Flat.

The northern two-thirds of the valley are used for pasturage by cattle ranches. The southern third is occupied by a playa on the Fly Ranch. The valley has a number of geothermal features associated with the northwest Nevada volcanic region, such as Fly Geyser, also called The Geyser, Cottonwood Springs, and Wards Hot Spring.

In 1997 the Burning Man festival, usually located in the Black Rock Desert, was held on private land in Hualapai Flat. The move was made in response to contain the traffic problems of the vast, open, Black Rock desert.

== See also ==
- List of valleys of Nevada
