= Hayford Peak =

Mountain in Nevada, United States

- Location within Nevada

Highest point
- Elevation: 9,924 ft (3,025 m) NAVD 88
- Prominence: 5,392 ft (1,643 m)
- Listing: US most prominent peaks 94th
- Coordinates: 36°39′28″N 115°12′03″W

Geography
- Location: Clark County, Nevada, U.S.
- Parent range: Sheep Range
- Topo map: USGS Hayford Peak

Climbing
- Easiest route: Hike class 1

Hayford Peak, elevation 9,924 feet (3,025 m), is the highest mountain in the Sheep Range of Clark County, Nevada, United States. It is the seventh-most topographically prominent peak in the state. The nearest taller mountain is Mount Charleston, 34 miles (55 km) to the southwest. In the winter months, there is snow on the peak, which usually lasts until early spring.

== See also ==
- List of Ultras of the United States
- Desert National Wildlife Refuge
- Hidden Forest Cabin
