= Pintwater Range =

Mountain range in Nevada, United States

- Location within Nevada

Highest point
- Peak: Quartz Peak, Pintwater Range (center-north)
- Elevation: 6,395 ft (1,949 m)

Geography
- Country: United States
- State: Nevada
- Counties: Clark; Lincoln
- Settlement: Indian Springs, NV
- Range coordinates: 36°56′25.855″N 115°33′44.079″W
- Borders on: Indian Springs Valley-W; Three Lakes Valley-E; East Desert Range-NE; Desert Range-SE; Spring Mountains-SSE
- Topo map: USGS Quartz Peak

The Pintwater Range is a mountain range in Clark and Lincoln counties, in the U.S. state of Nevada.

Pintwater Range was figuratively named due to a lack of water.
