= East Desert Range =

Mountain range in Nevada, United States

- Location within Nevada

Dimensions
- Length: 25 mi (40 km) NW-SE
- Width: 7 mi (11 km) (variable: linear NW, but 12 mi circular in southeast

Geography
- Country: United States
- State: Nevada
- District: Lincoln County
- Range coordinates: 36°51′29.871″N 115°15′35.049″W
- Borders on: Desert Lake & Valley-NE & E Desert Range-S; Three Lakes Valley-W & SW; Emigrant Valley-NW; Pahranagat Range-N
- Topo map: USGS Dead Horse Ridge

The East Desert Range is a mountain range in Lincoln County, Nevada.

== Description ==
The range is northwest–southeast trending around the Three Lakes Valley where Dog Bone Lake is the large landform in the valley flatlands. The range sits mostly to the north and northeast of Three Lakes Valley.

The southern terminus of the range lies in a mixture of hills associated with the north perimeter of the Desert Range to the south. The Desert Range is southwest trending around the Three Lakes Valley. The low hills region between the two ranges contain Sheep Pass (southern terminus with Desert Range) to Desert Valley and Desert Lake to the west of the Sheep Range. The region also contains Surprise Canyon, which flows due west into the east of Dog Bone Lake in Three Lakes Valley.
