= Donald W. Reynolds School of Journalism =

- Type: Public
- Established: September 14, 1984; 41 years ago
- Location: Reno, Nevada, U.S. 39.54137°N 119.81524°W
- Website: journalism.unr.edu

The Donald W. Reynolds School of Journalism (RSJ) is a professional school of the University of Nevada, Reno. Established on September 14, 1984, it counts six Pulitzer Prize recipients among its alumni. The school offers programs in advertising, public relations and integrated marketing, visual communications fields such as documentary film and graphic design, and bilingual media fields such as bilingual journalism and bilingual strategic communications.
