= Royston Hills =

Mountain range in Nye County, Nevada, US

- Location within Nevada

Highest point
- Elevation: 1,827 m (5,994 ft)

Geography
- Country: United States
- State: Nevada
- District: Nye County
- Range coordinates: 38°25′58.739″N 117°34′24.363″W
- Topo map: USGS Outlaw Springs NE

The Royston Hills are a mountain range in Nye County, Nevada.
