= Indian Springs Valley =

Desert basin in Nevada, United States

Coordinates: 36.61°N 115.69°W

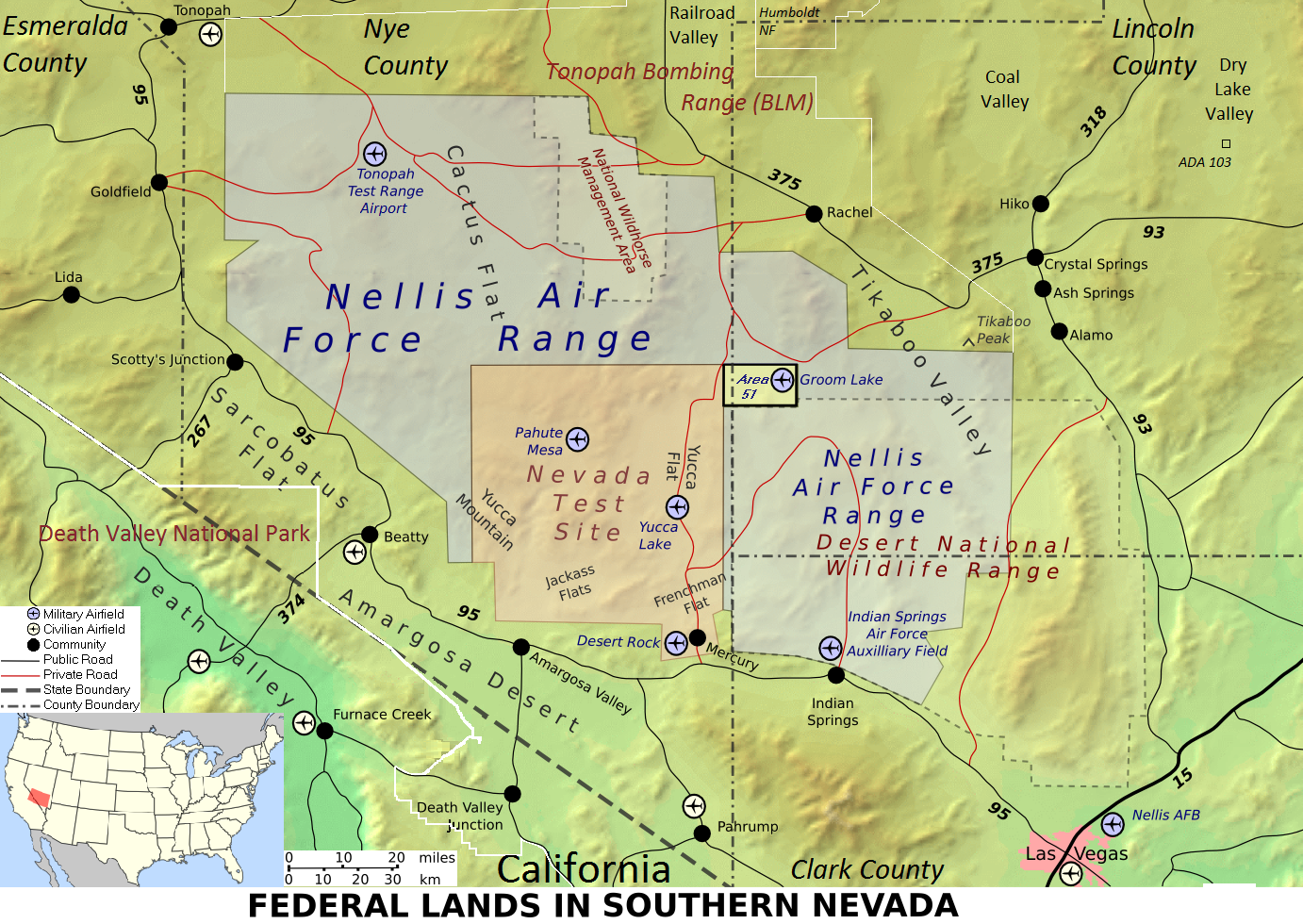
- The Indian Springs Valley is the location of Creech Air Force Base (formerly Indian Springs Air Force Auxiliary Field).

Geography
- Location: United States, Nevada

Indian Springs Valley (Basin 161) is one of the Central Nevada Desert Basins in the Clark County portion of the Nevada Test and Training Range and includes Creech Air Force Base and the communities of Cactus Springs and Indian Springs, Nevada. The south side of the valley is along the "Las Vegas Valley Shear Zone", and to the east is the Pintwater Range, to the southeast is the Las Vegas Valley, to the south are foothills near the Spring Mountains, to the southwest is Mercury Valley, and to the west is the Spotted Range. The valley's drainage basin receives ~500 acre-feet (620,000 m^{3}) of annual precipitation and is a southern portion of the Sand Springs-Tikaboo Watershed where it meets the Ivanpah-Pahrump Watershed. The Wheeler Survey in 1869 passed through the Indian Springs Valley.
