= Sage Hen Valley =

Nevadan valley

Coordinates: 40°04′12″N 119°10′16″W

Sage Hen Valley is a valley in the U.S. state of Nevada.

Sage Hen Valley was named for the sage hens which once roamed the valley. A variant name is "Sagehen Valley".
