= Groom Range =

Mountain range in Nevada, United States

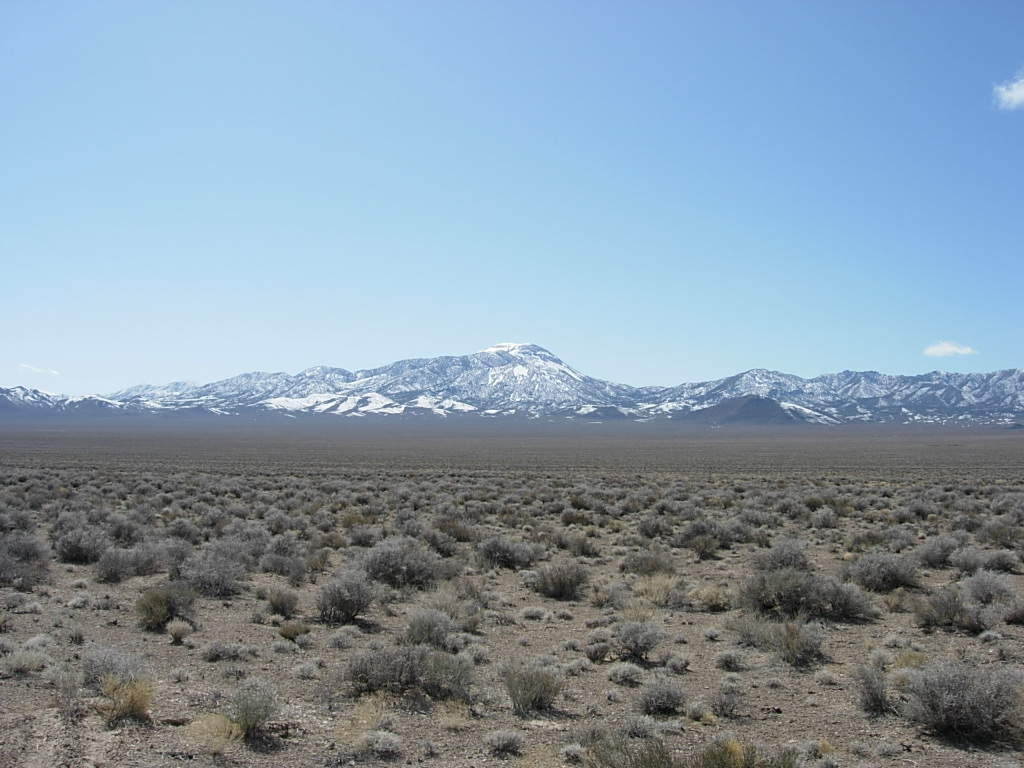
- A portion of Groom Range with highest peak in the center

Highest point
- Elevation: 2,819 m (9,249 ft)

Geography
- Location within Nevada
- Location: Part of the Nevada Test and Training Range
- Country: United States
- State: Nevada
- District: Lincoln County
- Range coordinates: 37°26′59.837″N 115°44′5.115″W
- Topo map: USGS Groom Range

The Groom Range is a mountain range in Lincoln County, Nevada. The range was renamed from Naquinta Mountains or Tequima Range in 1864, after Bob Groom, who discovered minerals in the range. It is located within the Nevada Test and Training Range, north of Groom Lake. The highest point in the Groom Range is 9,249 feet. The Groom Range is situated 26.6 miles north of the dry Groom Lake.

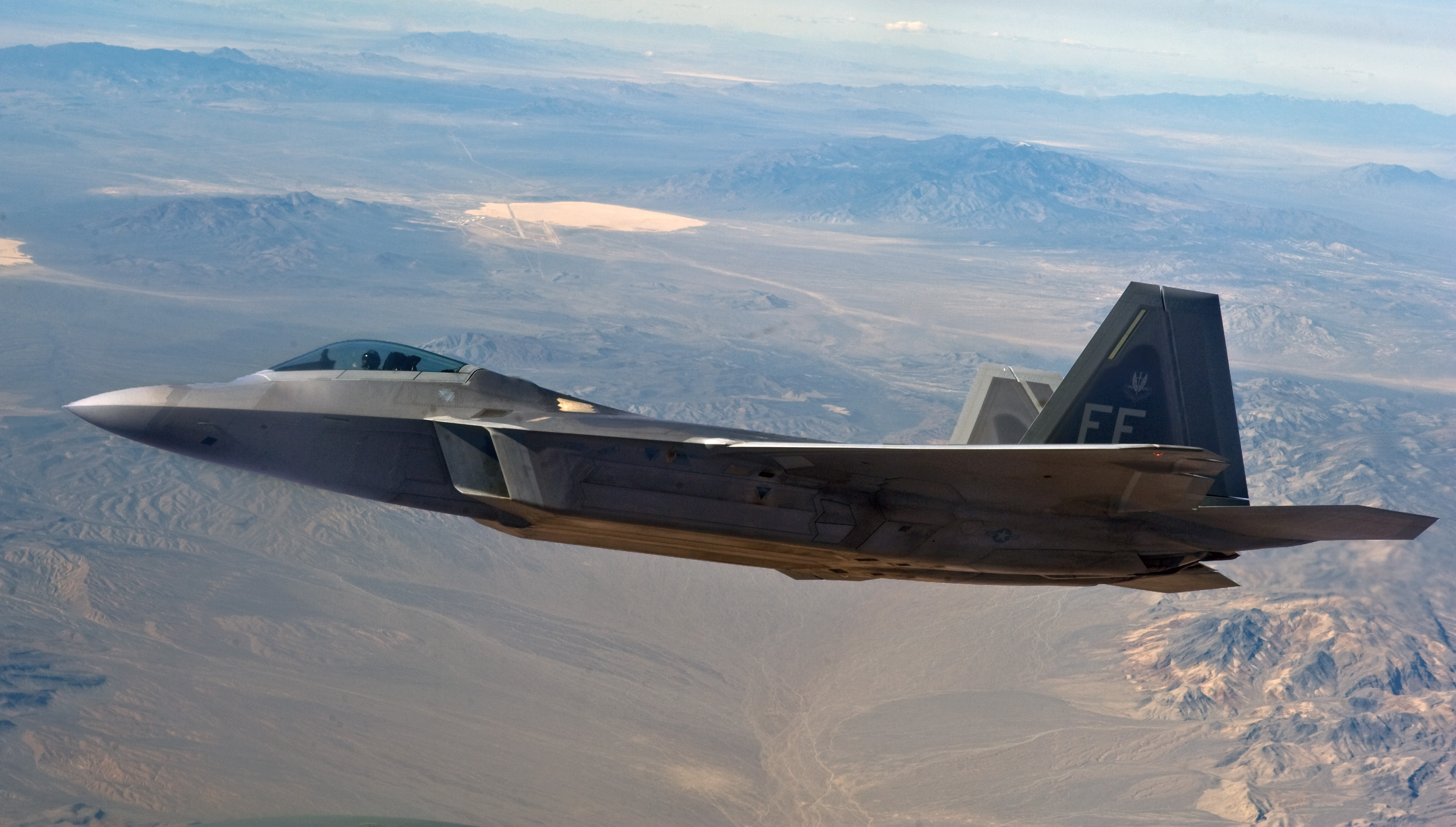
A F-22 is in the foreground, with the Groom Range in the background on the upper right

== See also ==
- Groom Mine
