= Eleana Range =

Mountain range in Nye County, Nevada, US

- Location within Nevada

Highest point
- Elevation: 1,809 m (5,935 ft)

Geography
- Country: United States
- State: Nevada
- District: Nye County
- Range coordinates: 37°6′41.824″N 116°11′45.155″W
- Topo map: USGS Tippipah Spring

The Eleana Range is a mountain range in Nye County, Nevada.
