= Little Smoky Valley =

Valley in Nevada, United States

Coordinates: 39°44′28″N 119°03′20″W

Little Smoky Valley is one of the Central Nevada Desert Basins and an eponym for the larger Little Smoky-Newark Watershed. The valley spans three counties in Nevada, namely Eureka, Nye, and White Pine.

The valley's numerous springs include Cool Tank, Mahogany, Moody, Little Nevada, Pogue Wells, and Soda Springs. Places in the valley include the Warm Springs, Nevada, community and the Little Smoky Valley Use Area for grazing.

Little Smoky Valley was so named on account of frequently foggy conditions.
