= Dogbone Lake (North Slope Borough, Alaska) =

Lake in the state of Alaska, United States

- Location within Alaska Location within North America
- Location: North Slope Borough, Alaska
- Coordinates: 69°36′N 152°03′W
- Type: Lake
- Surface elevation: 276 feet (84 m)

Dogbone Lake is a lake in North Slope Borough, Alaska, in the United States.

Dogbone Lake is shaped like a dog bone, hence the name.

== See also ==
- List of lakes in Alaska
