= Ranger Mountains =

Mountain range in Nevada, United States

- Location within Nevada

Highest point
- Elevation: 1,411 m (4,629 ft)

Geography
- Country: United States
- State: Nevada
- District: Clark County
- Range coordinates: 36°45′37.843″N 115°50′22.095″W
- Topo map: USGS Frenchman Lake SE

The Ranger Mountains are a mountain range in Clark County, Nevada.
