= Desert Range =

Mountain range in Nevada, U.S.

- Location within Nevada

Geography
- Country: United States
- State: Nevada
- County: Clark County
- Settlement: Indian Springs, NV
- Range coordinates: 36°50′25.868″N 115°20′18.055″W
- Borders on: N: East Desert Range; Three Lakes Valley-W & NW; Pintwater Range-NW; Sheep Range-(so. terminus)-E; Las Vegas Valley-S & SW; Spring Mountains-S
- Topo map: USGS Dead Horse Ridge

The Desert Range is a mountain range in Clark County, Nevada.

Desert Range was descriptively named on account of its desert landscape.
