= Mackay School of Earth Sciences and Engineering =

The Mackay School of Earth Sciences and Engineering (formerly Mackay School of Mines) is a specialized school within the University of Nevada, Reno. It is named after John Mackay, father of Clarence Mackay.

== Programs and facilities ==
Part of the College of Science, the school has three academic departments: Geological Sciences and Engineering, Mining Engineering and Geography.

The Mackay School also houses four departments devoted to public service: Nevada Bureau of Mines and Geology, Nevada Seismological Laboratory, Nevada State Climate Office and the Nevada Stable Isotope Laboratory. Research facilities include the Great Basin Center for Geothermal Energy, Center for Research in Economic Geology, Mining Life-Cycle Center, Center for Neotectonic Studies, Arthur Brant Laboratory for Exploration Geophysics, Collaboratory for Computational Geosciences, Dendro Laboratory and Geospatial Laboratory. The school is also affiliated with the U.S. Geological Survey and Desert Research Institute.

== Mackay School of Mines Building ==
- Mackay School of Mines Building
- U.S. National Register of Historic Places
- U.S. Historic district – Contributing property
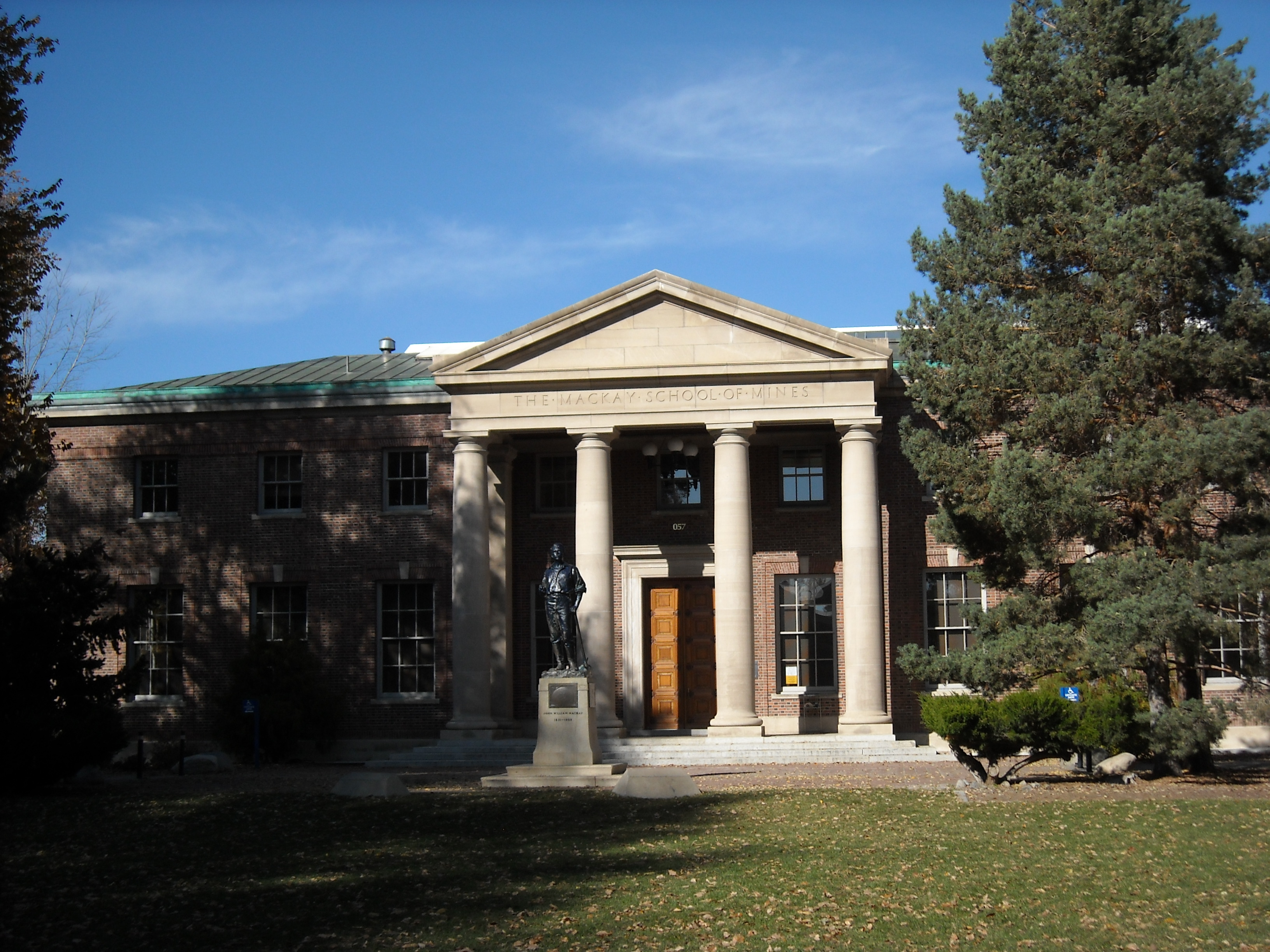
- Front of the Mackay Mines building

- Location within Nevada Location within the United States
- Location: University of Nevada, Reno campus, Reno, Nevada
- Coordinates: 39°32′22″N 119°48′48″W
- Built: June 1908; 118 years ago
- Architect: William Symmes Richardson, Frederic Joseph DeLongchamps
- Architectural style: Colonial Revival, Georgian Colonial
- NRHP reference No.: 82003258
- Added to NRHP: April 1, 1982; 44 years ago

In June 1908, the Mackay School of Mines building was presented to the University of Nevada, as a memorial to John Mackay, by his widow and son, Marie Louise Mackay and Clarence Mackay. A statue of John Mackay by Gutzon Borglum stands in front of the mining building on the main quad of the campus.

The "Mackay School of Mines Building," was listed on the National Register of Historic Places in 1982.

=== W. M. Keck Earth Science and Mineral Engineering Museum ===
The W. M. Keck Earth Science and Mineral Engineering Museum is located within the building. It focuses on early Nevada mining history, minerals, ores, fossil specimens and photographs and also contains a collection of ornate Mackay family silver completed by Tiffany & Co. in 1878.
