= Spotted Range =

Mountain range in Nevada, United States

- Location within Nevada

Highest point
- Elevation: 1,388 m (4,554 ft)

Geography
- Country: United States
- State: Nevada
- District: Clark County
- Range coordinates: 36°45′40.847″N 115°45′35.086″W
- Topo map: USGS Frenchman Lake SE

The Spotted Range is a mountain range in Clark County, Nevada.

Spotted Range was so named on account of its spotted rocks.
