= Emigrant Valley =

Valley in Nevada, United States

Coordinates: 39°35′34″N 117°41′57″W

Emigrant Valley is a valley in the U.S. state of Nevada.

Emigrant Valley was named for a party of emigrants who traveled through it. The valley is home to the Groom Lake Facility of the Nevada Test Range, popularly known as Area 51.
