= Belted Range =

Mountain range in Nevada, United States

- Location within Nevada

Highest point
- Elevation: 2,149 m (7,051 ft)

Geography
- Country: United States
- State: Nevada
- District: Nye County
- Range coordinates: 37°21′21.820″N 116°8′40.152″W
- Topo map: USGS Quartet Dome

The Belted Range is a mountain range in Nye County, Nevada, United States. The range is approximately 100 miles northwest of Las Vegas and midway between the Basin and Range National Monument to the northeast and the Death Valley Wilderness to the southwest.
