= Dog Bone Lake (Nevada) =

Lake in Nevada, United States

- Location in Nevada
- Location: Three Lakes Valley, Nevada
- Coordinates: 36°42′58″N 115°26′51″W
- Basin countries: United States
- Max. length: ~10 mi (16 km)
- Surface elevation: 3,415 ft (1,041 m)
- References: U.S. Geological Survey Geographic Names Information System: Dog Bone Lake (Nevada)

Dog Bone Lake is a dog bone-shaped topographic flat with two larger ends connected by a narrow body, which are two of the three eponymic features of their namesake, the Three Lakes Valley, Nevada.
