= Cactus Flat =

Landform in Nye County, Nevada, United States

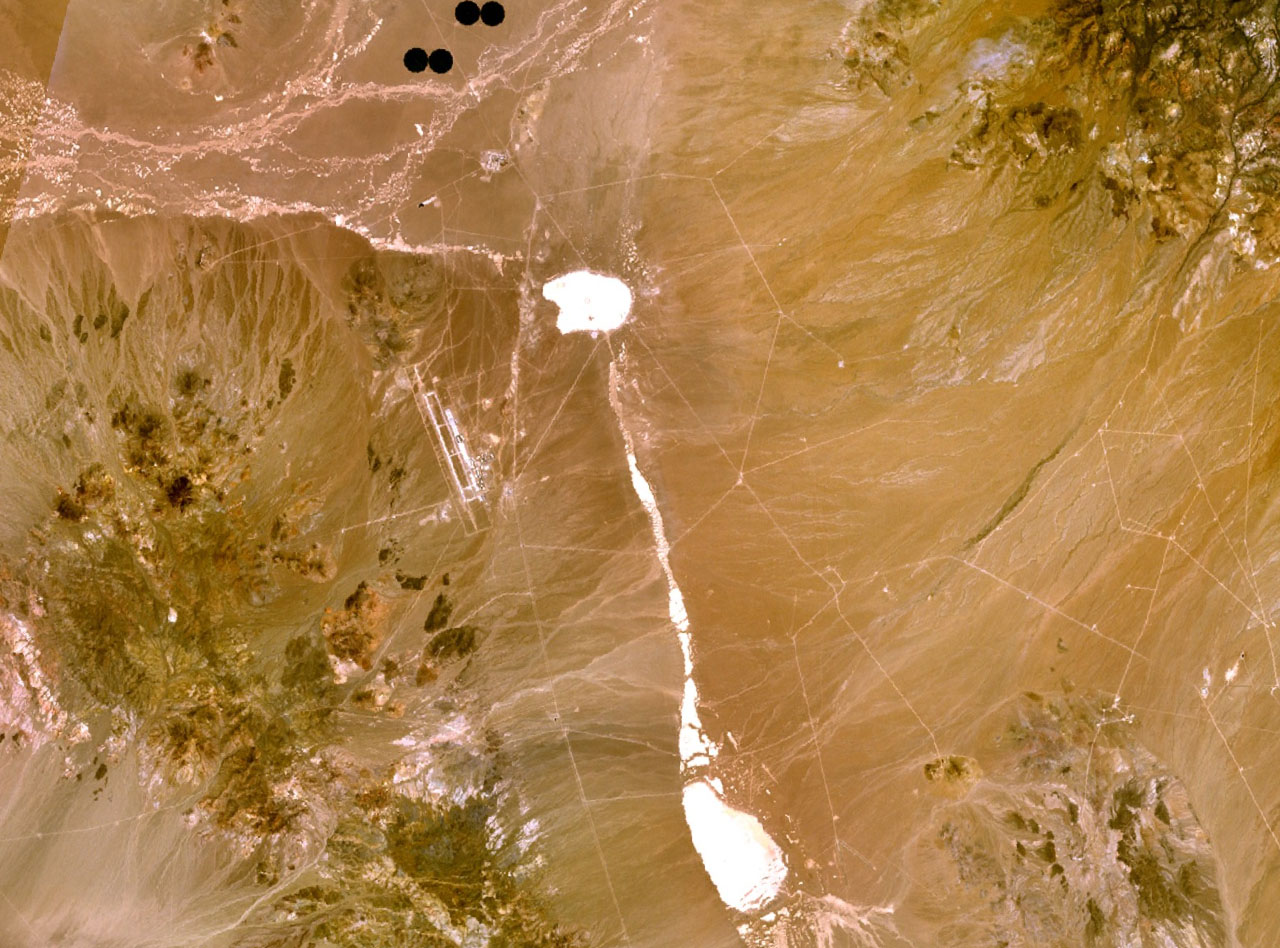
- Cactus Flat is the location of the Tonopah Test Range Airport (left of center).
- Floor elevation: 1630

Geography
- Country: United States
- State: Nevada
- Borders on: Cactus Range; Kawich Range
- Coordinates: 37°41′N 116°40′W
- Interactive map of Cactus Flat

Cactus Flat is one of the Central Nevada Desert Basins in the Cactus-Sacrobatus Watershed, for which it is an eponym. The flat is the location of the Tonopah Test Range Airport and Tonopah Test Range, a component of the Nevada Test and Training Range used for weapons testing since the 1950s. The flat is also the site of the 615 sq mi (1,590 km^{2}) Nevada Wild Horse Range of the Nellis Air Force Range.

The Kawich Range lies to the northeast and the Cactus Range to the southwest. Jack Rabbit Knob is 11.5 km (7.1 mi) east of Antelope Lake playa in Cactus Flat.

Cactus Flat has three cactus types (Beavertail cactus, Calico cactus and Barrel cactus).
