= Cactus Range =

Mountain range in Nye County, Nevada, US

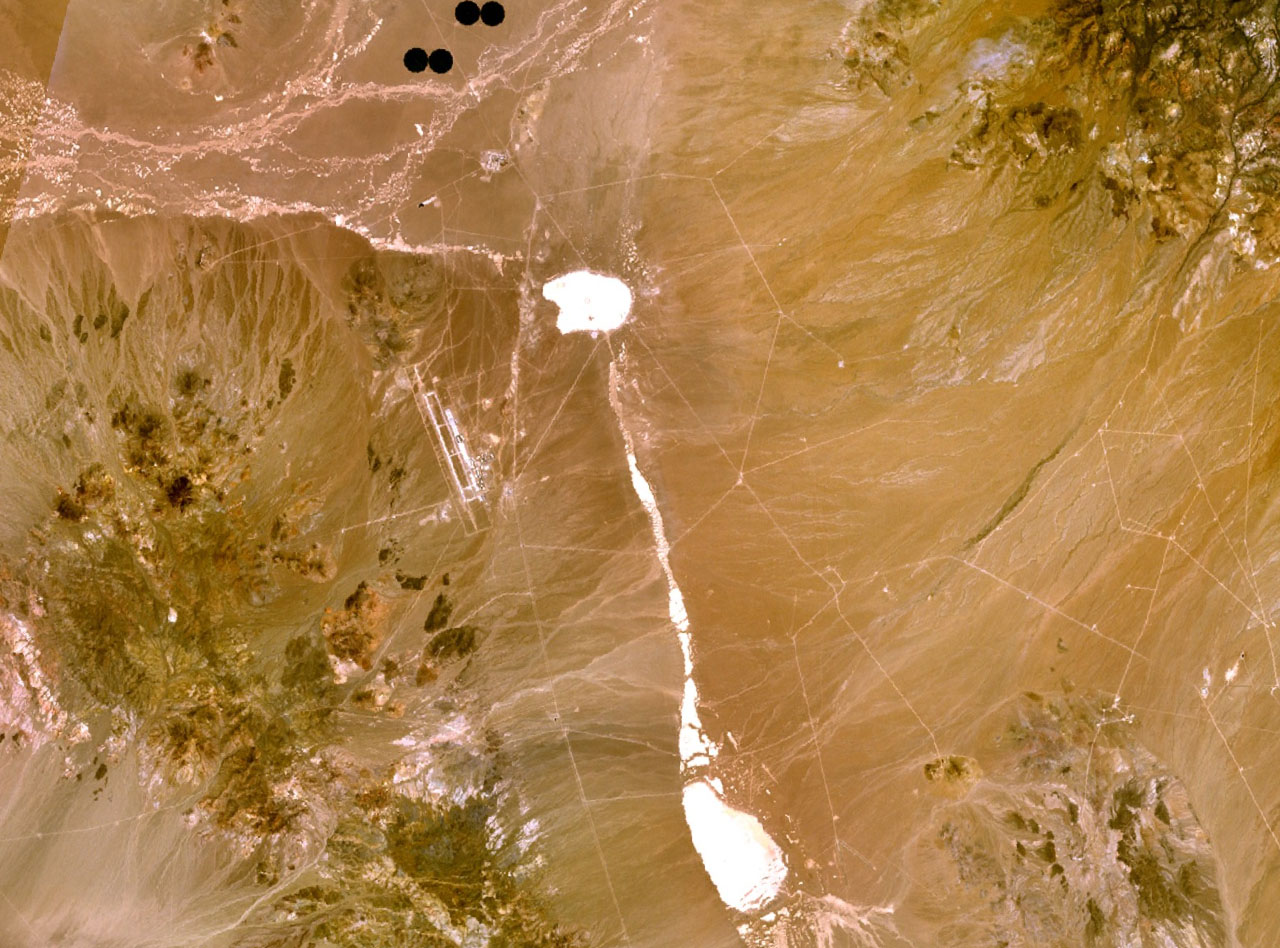
- The range is the green/brown area in the southwest part of the image. The Tonopah Test Range Airport lies on the northwest flank of the range.

Highest point
- Peak: Antelope Peak
- Elevation: 2,300 m (7,500 ft)
- Coordinates: 37°37.59′N 116°45.35′W

Geography
- Location within Nevada
- Country: United States
- State: Nevada
- District: Nye County
- Range coordinates: 37°40′53.776″N 116°49′33.233″W
- Topo map: USGS Cactus Spring

The Cactus Range is a small mountain range in Nye County, Nevada. The range lies southwest of Cactus Flat and north of Pahute Mesa. Goldfield lies 23 mi (37 km) to the west in Esmeralda County. The range lies within the restricted area of the Tonopah Test Range.

Named peaks in the range include:

- Antelope Peak 7,500 ft (2,300 m) at 37°37.59′N 116°45.35′W
- Cactus Peak 7,477 ft (2,279 m) at 37°46.97′N 116°52.69′W
- Urania Peak 7,333 ft (2,235 m) at 37°41.98′N 116°50.10′W
- Mount Helen 7,120 ft (2,170 m) at 37°30.39′N 116°44.46′W

Cactus Range was so named on account of cacti in the area.
