= Three Lakes Valley (Nevada) =

Valley in southern Nevada

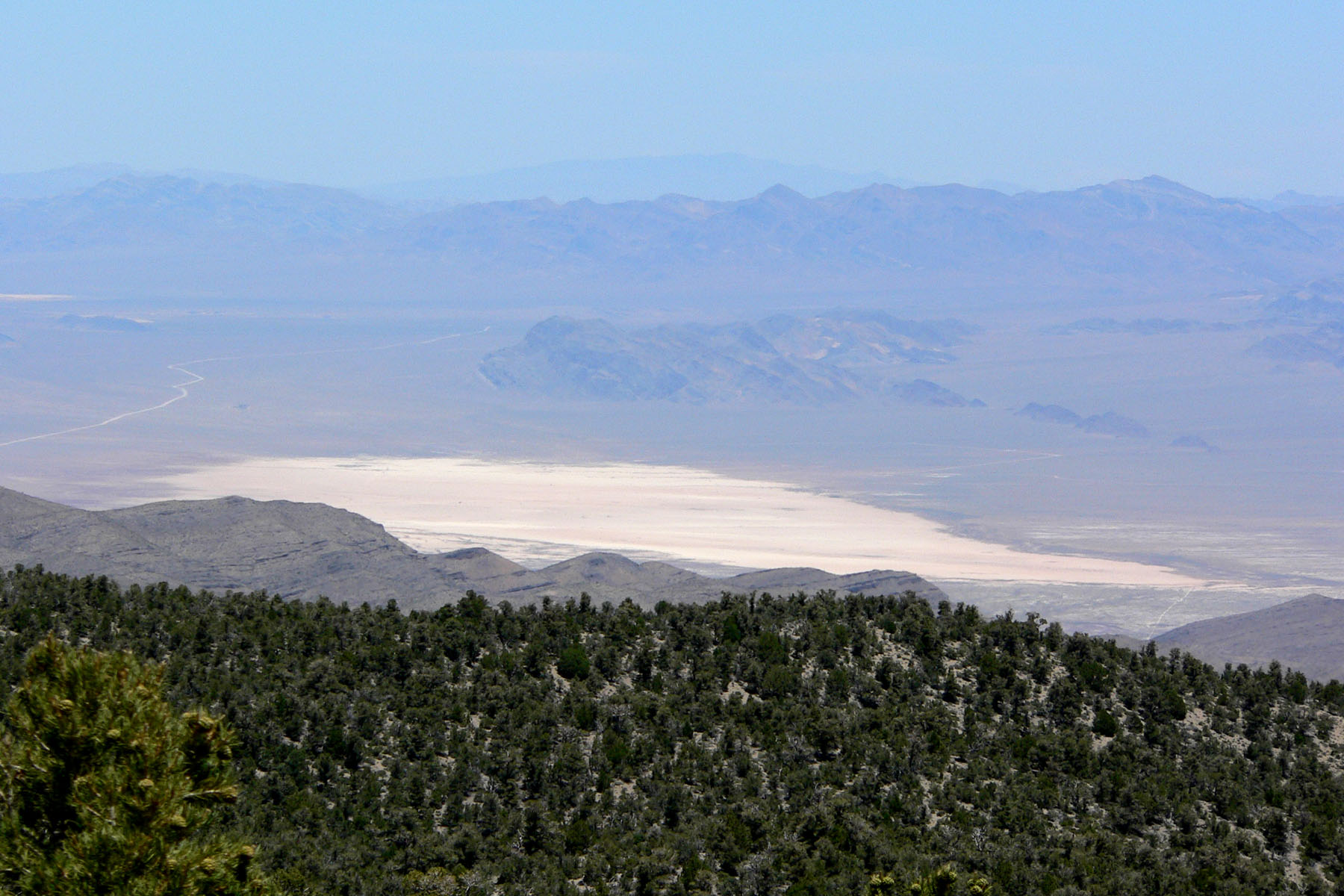
- Three Lakes Valley, Dog Bone Lake from Desert View, Spring Mountains

- Location within Nevada
- Length: 25 mi (40 km)
- Width: 8 mi (13 km)

Geography
- Location: Indian Springs, Nevada
- Borders on: Pintwater Range-W; East Desert Range-NE; Desert Range-SE; Las Vegas Valley-S & SW; Spring Mountains-S & SW
- Coordinates: 36.8801367°N 115.4476833°W
- Interactive map of Three Lakes Valley

Three Lakes Valley is a 25-mile (40 km) long, partially endorheic valley in southwest Lincoln County and northwest Clark County, Nevada. The southwest of the valley has a narrowing with washes that flow south into the watershed of the Las Vegas Valley, a tributary to Lake Mead–Colorado River watersheds.

== Description ==
Three Lakes Valley is short, only about 25 mi long, mostly north–south trending. The valley exits southwestwards between the foothills of perimeter mountains.

The bordering mountain ranges are the Pintwater Range, arc-shaped and north–south trending, on the west. The eastern borders of the valley are mostly the East Desert Range in the east and northeast; in the extreme southeast lies the northern areas of the Desert Range, where washes exit on the west to flow into the northwest-by-southeast Las Vegas Valley.

The Dog Bone Lake lakebed comprises about half the valley. Short washes mark the east and west valley perimeter; a longer string of washes extend northwest into a narrowing watershed source, between the convergence of the northern Pintwater Range and the northwest of the East Desert Range.
