= Centers, institutes, and facilities related to the University of Nevada, Reno =

There are several notable research and academic institutes, centers and facilities associated with the University of Nevada, Reno.

== Centers, Institutes & Facilities ==
- Academy for the Environment
- Applied Research Facility
- Arthur Brant Laboratory for Exploration Geophysics
- Bridge Research and Information Center
- Candida Adherence Mycology Research Unit
- Center for the Application of Substance Abuse Technologies
- Center for Applied Research
- Center for Basque Studies
- Center for Civil Engineering Earthquake Research
- Center for Economic Development
- Center for Environmental Arts and Humanities
- Center for Environmental Sciences & Engineering
- Center for Holocaust, Genocide and Peace Studies
- Center for Learning and Literacy
- Center for Logistics Management
- Center for Neotectonic Studies
- Center for Research Design and Analysis (CRDA)
- Center for Research in Economic Geology
- Center of Biomedical Research Excellence
- The Collaboratory for Computational Geosciences
- Conservation Genetics Center
- Great Basin Center for Geothermal Energy
- Great Basin Institute
- Grant Sawyer Center for Justice Studies
- Institute for Innovation and Informatics
- Institute for the Study of Gambling and Commercial Gaming
- Latino Research Center
- Materials Characterization Nevada
- Mining Life-Cycle Center
- Nevada Agricultural Experiment Station
- Nevada Bureau of Mines and Geology
- Nevada Center for Ethics & Health Policy
- Nevada Genomics Center
- Nevada Institute for Sustainability
- Nevada Seismological Laboratory
- Nevada Space Grant
- Nevada Terawatt Facility
- Nevada Training Partnership
- Nevada Transgenic Center
- Oral History Program
- Photon Ion Research Facility
- Raggio Research Center
- Research & Educational Planning Center
- Sanford Center for Aging
- University Center for Excellence in Development Disabilities
- W. M. Keck Earth Sciences and Mining Research Information Center
