= Sheep Range =

Mountain range in Nevada, United States

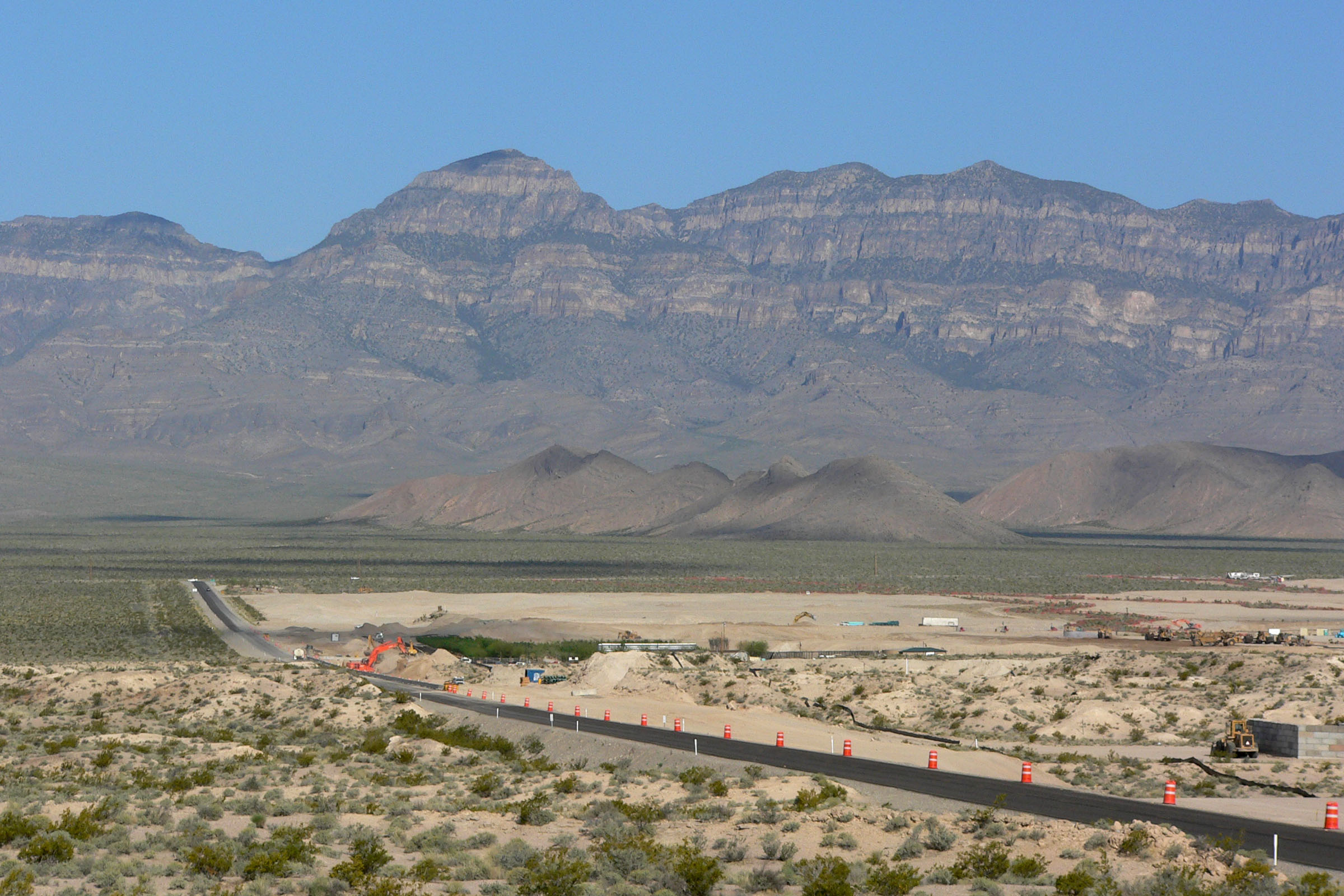
- Sheep Range from Starvation Flat

Highest point
- Peak: Hayford Peak
- Elevation: 9,912 ft (3,021 m)

Geography
- Location within Nevada
- Country: United States
- State: Nevada
- Districts: Clark County; Lincoln County
- Range coordinates: 36°48′29″N 115°07′43″W
- Borders on: East Desert Range; Desert Range; Delamar Mountains; Las Vegas Range; Las Vegas Valley

The Sheep Range is located north of Las Vegas, Nevada, in the United States. It is found in both Clark and Lincoln Counties in the Desert National Wildlife Refuge. The mountains reach a peak at Hayford Peak, 9,912 feet (3,021 m) above sea level between the Las Vegas Range to the east and the Desert Range to the west. The Sheep Range lies in a generally north-south direction.

The Great Basin Divide starts an east-west transect at the northeast of the Spring Mountains, with the east-west transect border south being all of the Las Vegas Valley, and a midsection, north perimeter of the watershed for the Las Vegas Wash. The Great Basin Divide transect goes through the south region of the Sheep Range, and the transect ends eastwards at the Utah border, the Clover and Bull Valley Mountains.

The range was named for mountain sheep which roamed there.
