= University of Nevada, Reno =

Public university in Reno, Nevada, US

- Former names: State University of Nevada (1874–1881); Nevada State University (1881–1906); University of Nevada (1906–1969)
- Motto: Omnia Pro Patria (Latin)
- Motto in English: "All for Our Country"
- Type: Public land-grant research university
- Established: October 12, 1874; 151 years ago
- Parent institution: Nevada System of Higher Education
- Accreditation: NWCCU
- Academic affiliations: ORAU; Space-grant
- Endowment: $640.3 million (2025)
- President: Brian Sandoval
- Provost: Jeff Thompson
- Faculty: 1,082
- Students: 20,945 (fall 2022)
- Undergraduates: 16,973 (fall 2022)
- Postgraduates: 3,972 (fall 2022)
- Location: Reno, Nevada, United States; 39°32′16″N 119°48′50″W
- Campus: 200 acres (81 ha); Large city
- Other campuses: Incline Village
- Newspaper: The Nevada Sagebrush
- Colors: Navy blue and silver
- Nickname: Wolf Pack
- Sporting affiliations: NCAA Division I FBS – Mountain West
- Mascots: Alphie; Wolfie Jr.; Luna
- Website: www.unr.edu
- University of Nevada Historic District
- U.S. National Register of Historic Places
- U.S. Historic district
- Location within Nevada
- Location: Virginia Street, Reno, Nevada
- Area: 290 acres (117.4 ha) (entire campus); 40 acres (16 ha) (historic district)
- Built: 1906
- Architect: Multiple
- Architectural style: Late 19th and 20th Century Revivals, Second Empire, Jeffersonian Revival
- NRHP reference No.: 87000135
- Added to NRHP: February 25, 1987

The University of Nevada, Reno (Nevada, the University of Nevada, or UNR) is a public land-grant research university in Reno, Nevada, United States. It is the state's flagship public university and primary land grant institution. It was founded on October 12, 1874, in Elko, Nevada.

The university is classified as a doctoral, R1 research university by the Carnegie Classification. In 2018, the university spent $144 million on research and development according to the National Science Foundation. Among its several schools and colleges, the university has a medical school and is home to the Donald W. Reynolds School of Journalism from which six Pulitzer Prize winners have graduated.

== History ==
The Nevada state constitution established a university when it was adopted in 1864, in order to receive funds from the Morrill Act. The State University of Nevada in Elko was created on October 12, 1874. In 1881, it became Nevada State University. In 1885, Nevada State University moved from Elko to Reno, as enrollment never exceeded 35 students and many families at the time opted to send their children to universities in California. Local rancher John Newton "Newt" Evans sold land for the university at a site north of Reno for $1,250. Its first building, Morrill Hall, was dedicated in 1886, named after Justin Morrill, whose act provided funds for the university. The first year of instruction was 1887, with fifty students.

In 1906, it was renamed the University of Nevada. The University of Nevada remained the only four-year academic institution in the state until 1965, when the Nevada Southern campus (now the University of Nevada, Las Vegas) separated into its own university. In 1969, the university's name was changed to the University of Nevada, Reno to distinguish from the new institution in Las Vegas. In 2022, UNR acquired the physical assets of the defunct Sierra Nevada University in Incline Village to create the University of Nevada, Reno at Lake Tahoe.

== Academics ==
Bachelor's, master's and doctoral programs are offered through:

=== Colleges ===
- College of Agriculture, Biotechnology and Natural Resources
- College of Business
- College of Education & Human Development
- College of Engineering
- College of Liberal Arts
- College of Science
- Honors College
- National Judicial College
- University of Nevada Cooperative Extension

=== Schools ===
- Graduate School
- School of the Arts
- School of Earth Sciences and Engineering
- School of Journalism
- School of Medicine
- School of Nursing
- School of Public Health
- School of Social Research and Justice Studies
- School of Social Work

=== Centers ===
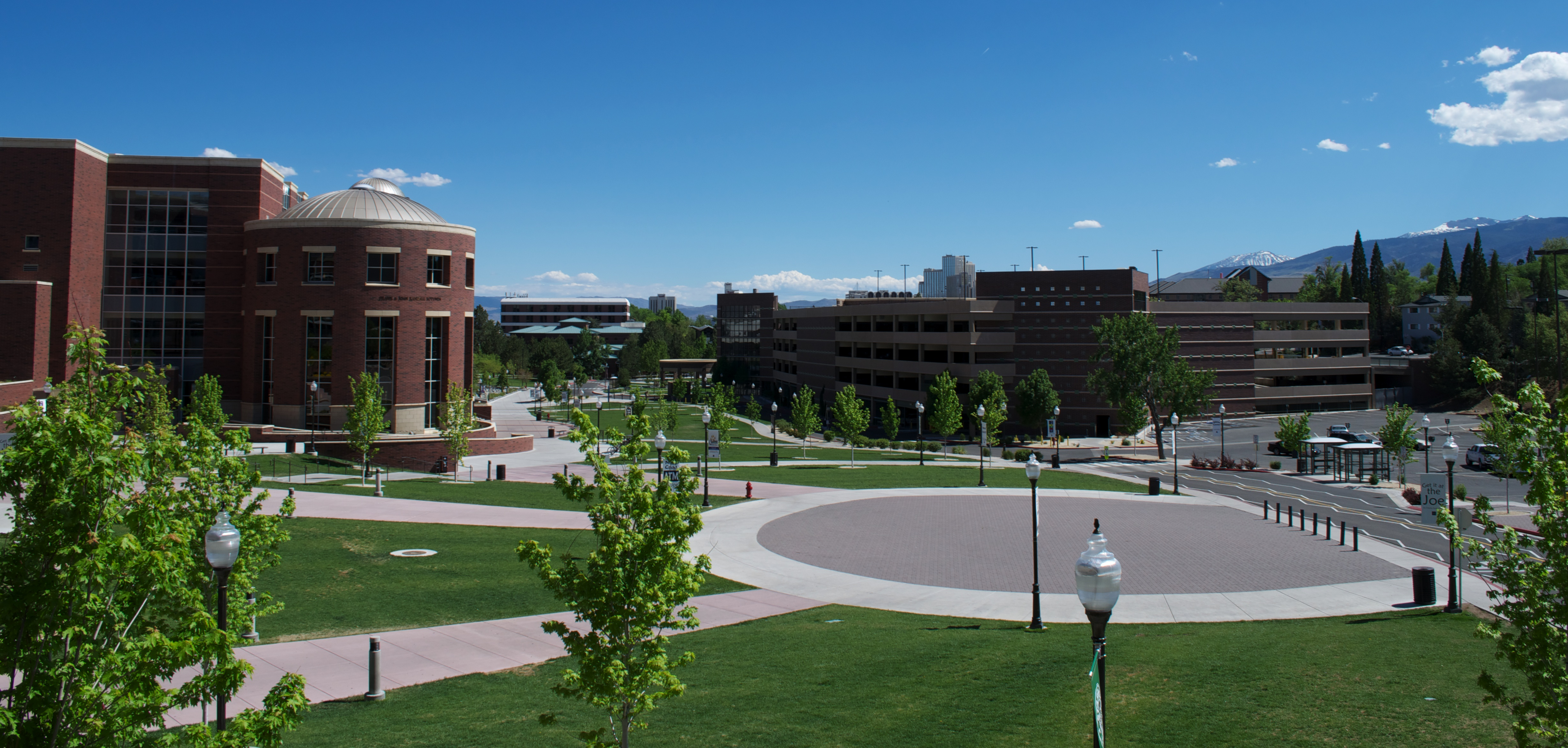
View of the Campus in front of UNR Knowledge Center

Nevada sponsors a center dedicated to Basque studies (Including the Basque language) due to the large Basque population in Northern Nevada.

In addition, the university maintains and sponsors many centers, institutes & facilities.

=== Libraries ===
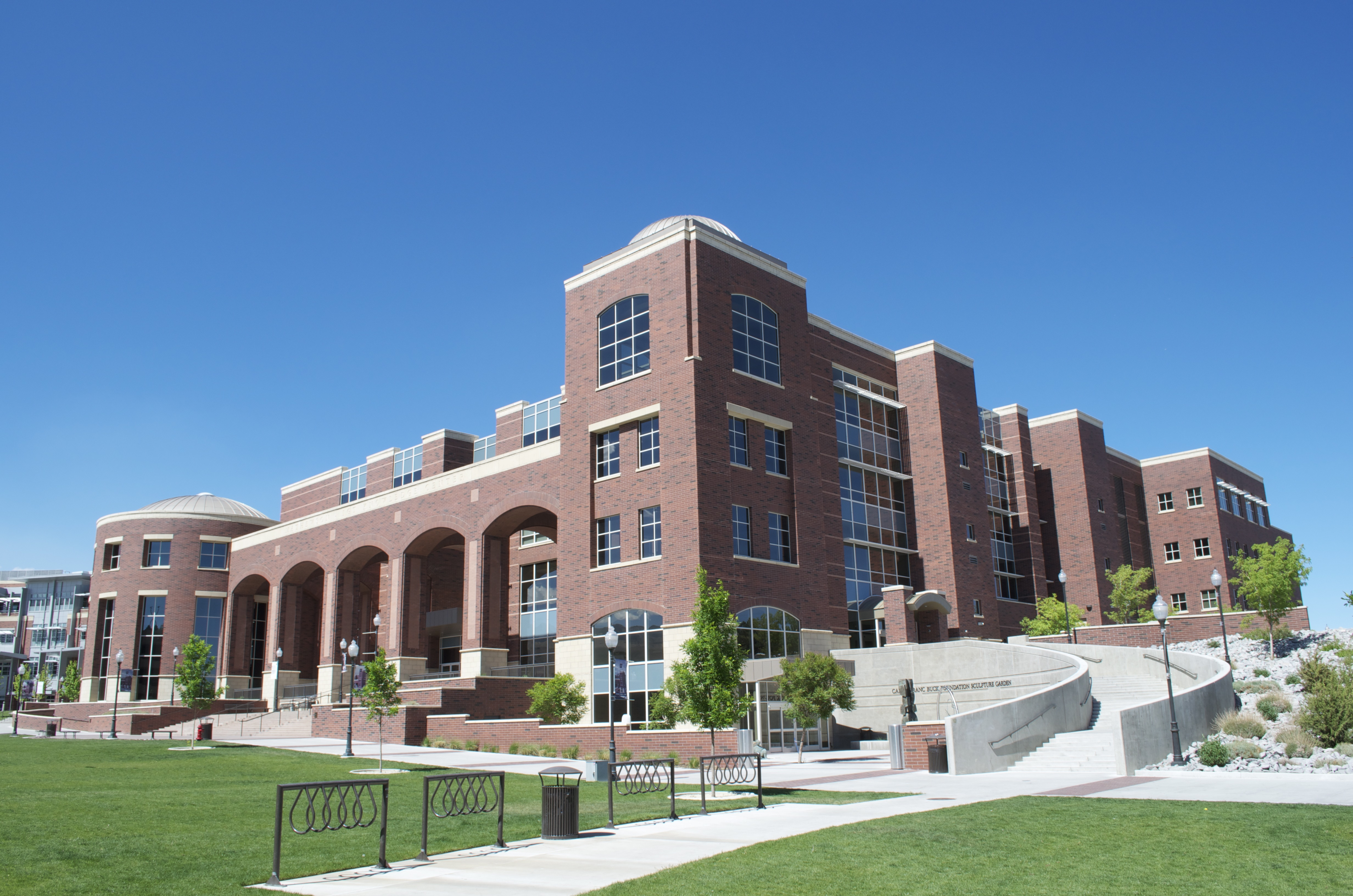
UNR Matthewson-IGT Knowledge Center

The university and surrounding community is served by several campus libraries. The libraries are:

- Mathewson-IGT Knowledge Center (main library). Opened on August 11, 2008, it was a $75.3 million project which began in September 2005. It replaced the Getchell library.
  - Basque Library (housed in separate section of the Knowledge Center)
  - Special Collections and University Archives (3rd floor of the Matthewson IGT-Knowledge Center)
- DeLaMare Library (engineering, physical sciences, computer science, mining, and geology)
  - Mary B. Ansari Map Library (housed in basement of DeLaMare)
- Savitt Medical Library
- Nell J. Redfield Learning and Resource Center (education library and resources)

For the 2024–2025 academic year, the middle 50% of enrolled students scored between 1050 and 1360 on the SAT (with a 50th percentile of 1200), between 520 and 680 on the SAT Evidence-Based Reading and Writing section (50th percentile: 600), and between 530 and 680 on the SAT Math section (50th percentile: 600).

=== Rankings and reputation ===
Academic rankings

National
- Forbes: 167
- U.S. News & World Report: 204 (tie)
- Washington Monthly: 204
- WSJ/College Pulse: 348

Global
- ARWU: 601–700
- QS: 1001-1200 [2026 published]
- U.S. News & World Report: 809

In 2025, U.S. News & World Report ranked UNR tied for 204th overall among universities nationwide and tied for 113th among public universities. Also in 2025, Forbes ranked UNR 167th overall, 74th among public universities, and 36th among western universities.

In 2020, Washington Monthly ranked UNR 138th out of 389 universities nationally based on its contribution to the public good, as measured by social mobility, research, and promoting public service.

== Campus ==
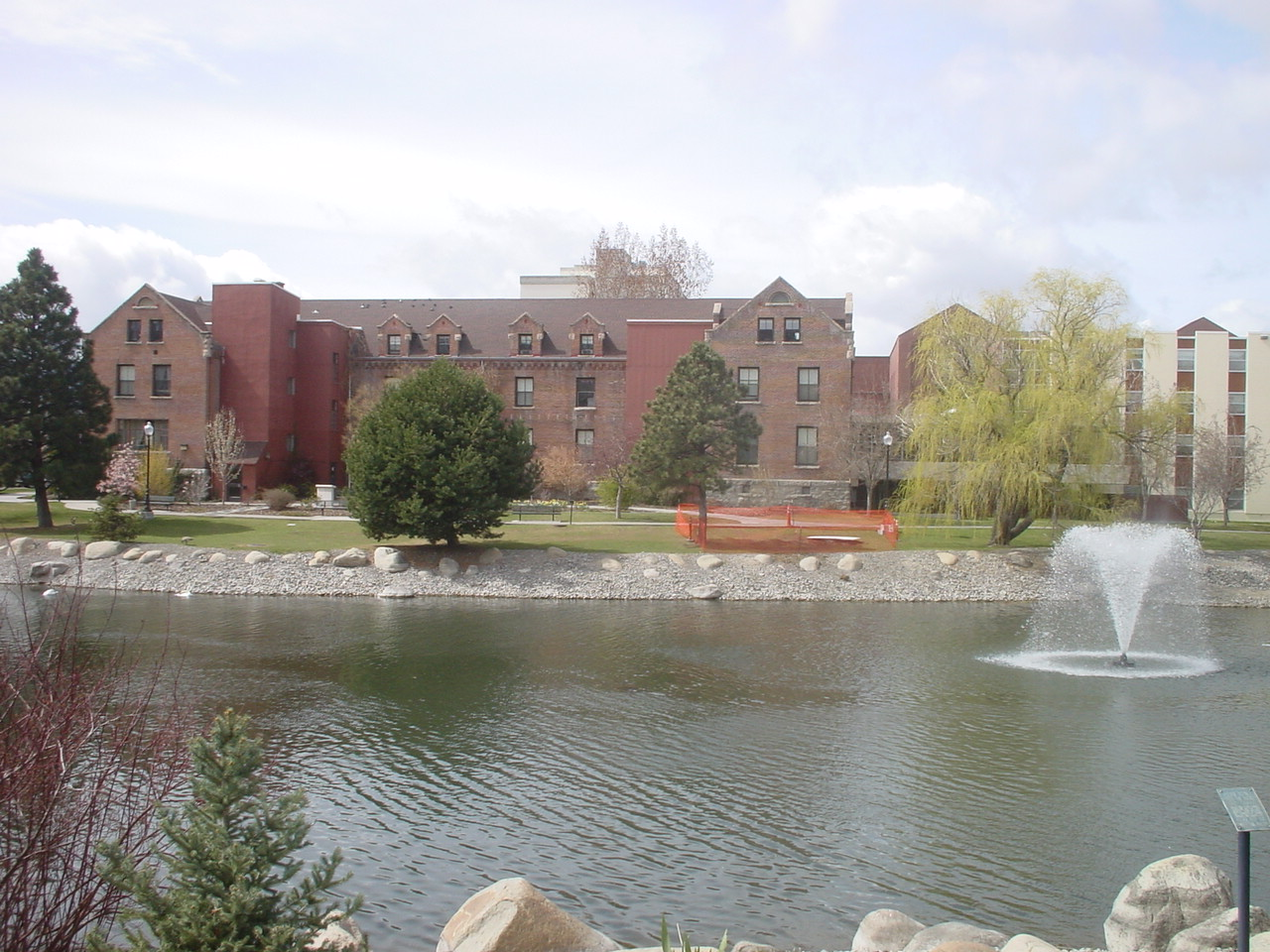
Manzanita Lake in the southwestern part of the campus.

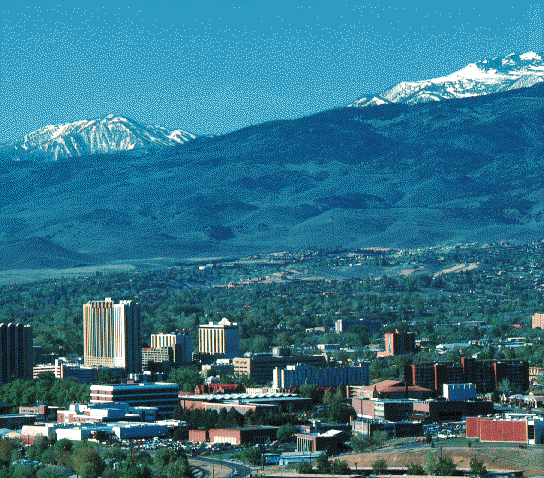
An older picture showing part of the campus in the foreground

The University of Nevada, Reno is Nevada's flagship institution of higher education. The main campus is located just north of downtown Reno overlooking Truckee Meadows and the downtown casinos.

=== Early construction ===
The university's first building, Morrill Hall, was completed in 1887 and still stands on the historic "Q" quadranagle at the campus' southern end. The hall is named after United States Senator Justin Morrill, author of the 1862 Morrill Land-Grant Acts.

Originally single-gender occupancy, Lincoln Hall for male students and Manzanita Hall for female students were both opened in 1896. While Lincoln was under construction, male students were housed in the building which had previously held the now-defunct Bishop Whitaker's School for Girls, which had closed in 1894.

=== The Quad ===
The tree-lined quadrangle, referred to as the "Quad," is located in the southern part of the campus, surrounded by Morrill Hall and the Mackay School of Mines. It is modeled after the quadrangle at the University of Virginia.

=== Herbarium ===
The herbarium at UNR is made up of the herbariums of the Nevada Agricultural Experiment Station in the College of Agriculture and the Biology Department. They have operated as one unit since 1978. Among those who worked at the herbarium were Patrick Beveridge Kennedy and Amos Arthur Heller at the experiment station and Philip Augustus Lehenbauer, Dwight Billings, Hugh Nelson Mozingo, Ira La Rivers and William Andrew Archer at the biology department.

=== Mackay Stadium ===
The football team plays at Mackay Stadium. The modern Mackay Stadium was completed in 1966 with a seating capacity of 7,500. The facility has been expanded several times in the last 15 years and now seats 30,000.

=== E.L. Wiegand Fitness Center ===
UNR began construction of a new 108,000 square foot fitness center in June 2015. Named the E.L. Wiegand Fitness Center, it opened in February 2017. Students' use of the fitness center is included in annual tuition and fees. The fitness center has four floors and includes a gym with three basketball courts, areas for weightlifting, cardio training, fitness classes, stadium stairs and an indoor running track. The project had a $46 million cost.

=== Lake Tahoe campus ===
UNR's Lake Tahoe campus, named after businessman Wayne L. Prim, operates on the former campus of Sierra Nevada University. Currently, the campus is primarily used for research with two graduate programs in interdisciplinary arts and creative writing offered at the campus. A nursing program will be launched in fall 2026, marking the first bachelor's degree program offered since SNU's closure.

=== Sustainability ===
Since its creation in the fall of 2008, UNR's sustainability committee has been gathering information on various aspects of campus sustainability and beginning the development of a plan for creating a more sustainable campus. Significant efforts are made towards recycling and keeping the campus green. Many university buses run on biodiesel fuels. The bicycle program has seen a significant increase in the number of bicycle users. The university's food services has made a commitment of 1% of the meal plan revenue to go towards funding sustainable initiatives on campus. In order to reduce energy use, UNR has installed solar panels on the Joe Crowley Student Union and built its first LEED-accredited building. It has been ranked among the nation's most sustainable colleges, receiving an overall grade of "B+" on the Sustainable Endowment Institute's College Sustainability Report Card 2010.

== Athletics ==
The university is simply called Nevada for athletics purposes. Its sports teams are nicknamed the Wolf Pack (always two words). They participate in the NCAA's Division I (FBS for football) and in the Mountain West Conference.

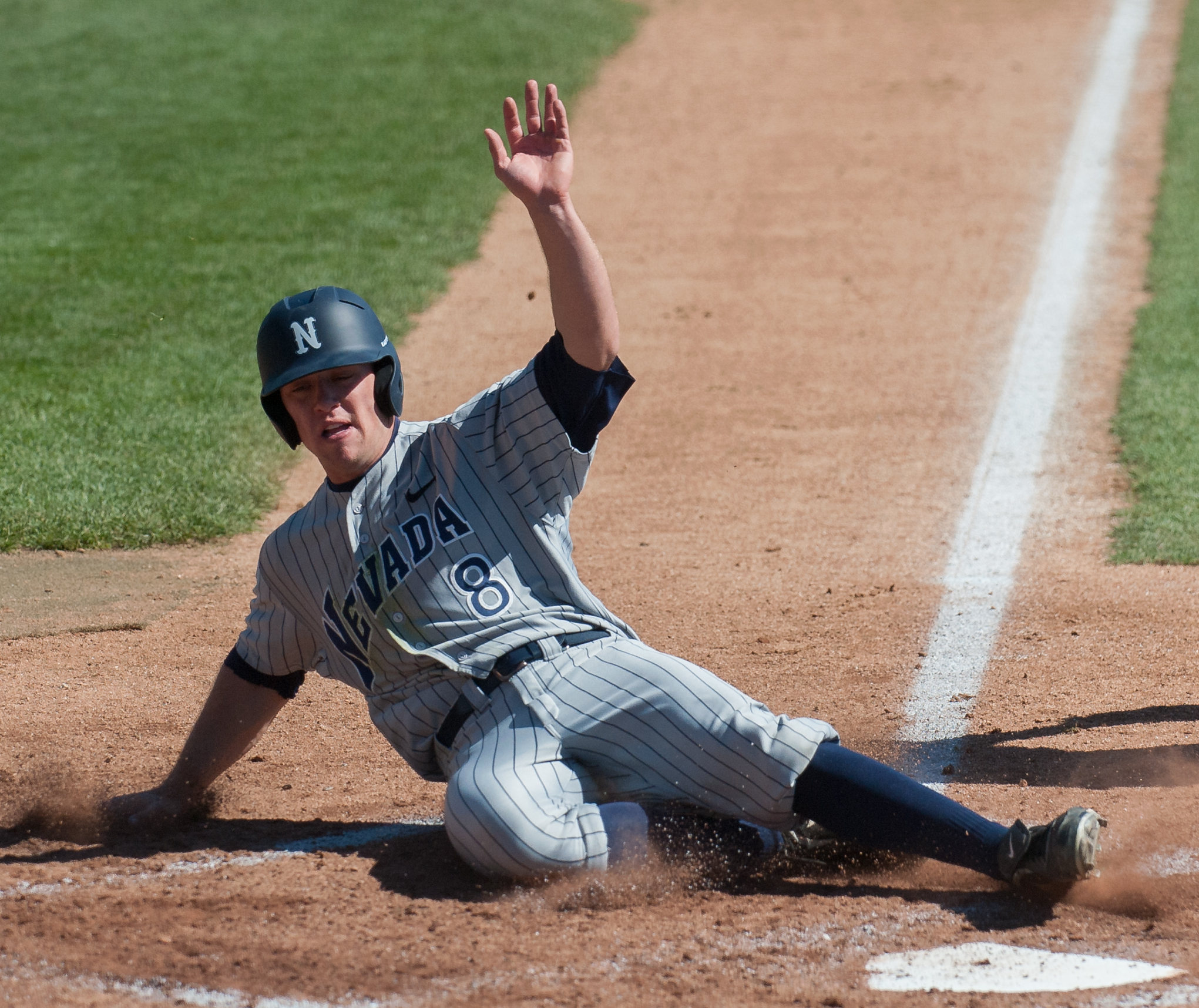
A Nevada Wolf Pack baseball player scores a run during a 2011 game in Los Angeles

=== Men's basketball ===
In March 2004, the Wolf Pack men's basketball team qualified for the NCAA tournament and advanced to the Sweet Sixteen for the first time in school history. The team earned a repeat trip in 2005 and beat Texas in the first round before falling to eventual national runner-up Illinois. The team returned for 2006 as a number five seed but was upset in the first round by former Big Sky Conference rival Montana. They began the 2006–07 season ranked 24th. The Pack's major star during this recent period of success was Nick Fazekas. In 2007, Nevada was ranked No. 9 in men's basketball, which is the highest ranking that Nevada has ever held.

=== Football ===
The football team plays at Mackay Stadium. The modern Mackay Stadium replaced its predecessor and was completed in 1966 with a seating capacity of 7,500. The facility has been expanded several times in its history and now seats 30,000. In 2005, Nevada won a share of the WAC Title. The 2010 season saw Nevada at its best finishing the season ranked No. 11 in the AP and No. 13 in the BCS, stunning Boise State, 34–31, and costing the Broncos a possible shot at the BCS title, to win another share of the WAC title.

=== Conference affiliations ===
Nevada joined the Mountain West Conference in 2012.

Previous conference memberships include:

- 1954–1968 – Northern California Athletic Conference
- 1969–1978 – West Coast Conference – (Independent for football)
- 1979–1991 – Big Sky (swapped conference affiliations with Gonzaga University, which has been without football since 1941)
- 1992–1998 – Big West
- 1999–2012 – WAC

== Student media ==
Undergraduate demographics as of Fall 2023
Race and ethnicity	Total
White	51%
Hispanic	25%
Two or more races	9%
Asian	8%
Black	3%
Unknown	2%
American Indian/Alaska Native	1%
International student	1%
Economic diversity
Low-income (Note: The percentage of students who received an income-based federal Pell grant intended for low-income students.)	26%
Affluent (Note: The percentage of students who are a part of the American middle class at the bare minimum.)	74%

The university has four official student media organizations, including The Nevada Sagebrush, Wolf Pack Radio, Insight Magazine (formally Artemisia), and The Brushfire Literature & Arts Journal.

=== The Nevada Sagebrush ===
Nevada's editorially independent, monthly student newspaper is The Nevada Sagebrush. Prior to 2004, the newspaper called itself simply the Sagebrush.

The newspaper has won the Associated Collegiate Press Pacemaker Award seven times—in 2007, 2008, 2009, 2010, 2011, 2012, and most recently 2015 (as of June 2025).

=== Wolf Pack Radio ===
Nevada's official student-run streaming-audio radio broadcast is Wolf Pack Radio. The station curates songs and creates radio shows for the student population on their official website. The station also partners with KWNK to broadcast the student-made radio shows on FM in the Reno area.

On May 1, 1922, a license was issued to the university for station KOJ, the first broadcasting station in the state of Nevada. However, KOJ apparently never made any broadcasts, and its license, although it had been issued for a three month period, was canceled on June 7.

=== Insight Magazine ===
The university also sponsors Insight Magazine, the university's photography and lifestyle magazine. Insight Magazine was previously known as Artemisia until summer 2008. Under the name Artemisia, the magazine served as the university yearbook beginning in 1896.

=== Brushfire ===
Brushfire, a literature and arts journal, was created in 1950 to promote humanties among Nevada students.

== Film history ==
The University of Nevada's classically styled campus has served as the setting for many movies, including:

- Andy Hardy's Blonde Trouble (1944)
- Margie (1946)
- Apartment for Peggy (1948)
- Mother Is a Freshman (1949)
- Mr. Belvedere Goes to College (1949)
- 5 Against the House (1955)
- Hilda Crane (1956)
