= Coal (disambiguation) =

Coal is a sedimentary rock composed mainly of carbon and used as a fossil fuel.

Coal may also refer to:

== Particular types of Coal ==
- Anthracite
- Bituminous coal
- Lignite

== Other combustible fuels ==
- Charcoal, a similar solid carbon compound also used as a fuel source, frequently shortened to coal
- Ember, a lump of solid fuel in a fire, also called a hot coal

== Media ==
- Coal (TV series), American reality show about coal miners
- Coal (book), collection of poetry by Audre Lorde, published in 1976
- Coal, a 2006 album by the indie rock band The Devastations
- Coal (Leprous album)
- Coal (Kathy Mattea album), 2008
- Coal, one of the mascots of the 2002 Winter Olympics.
- Coal, the title of a children's story from the Railway Series book Henry the Green Engine by the Reverend Wilbert Awdry

== Locations ==
- Coal, Missouri
- Coal County, Oklahoma
- Coal City (disambiguation)
- Coal Creek (disambiguation)
- Coal Fork, West Virginia
- Coal Harbor (disambiguation)
- Coal Hill (disambiguation)
- Coal Hollow (disambiguation)
- Coal Island (disambiguation)
- Coal Lake (disambiguation)
- Coal Mountain (disambiguation)
- Coal Ridge (disambiguation)
- Coal River (disambiguation)
- Coal Run (disambiguation)
- Coal Township (disambiguation)
- Coal Valley (disambiguation)
- Coalmont (disambiguation)
- Forks of Coal, West Virginia

== Animals ==
- Coal skink, a species of lizard
- Coal tit, a passerine bird in the tit family Paridae

== Other uses ==
- Wande Coal (born 1985), Nigerian singer

== See also ==
- Chal (name)
- Cole (disambiguation)
- Col (disambiguation)
- Kohl (disambiguation)
