= Meeker Peak =

Mountain summit in Lincoln County, Nevada, United States

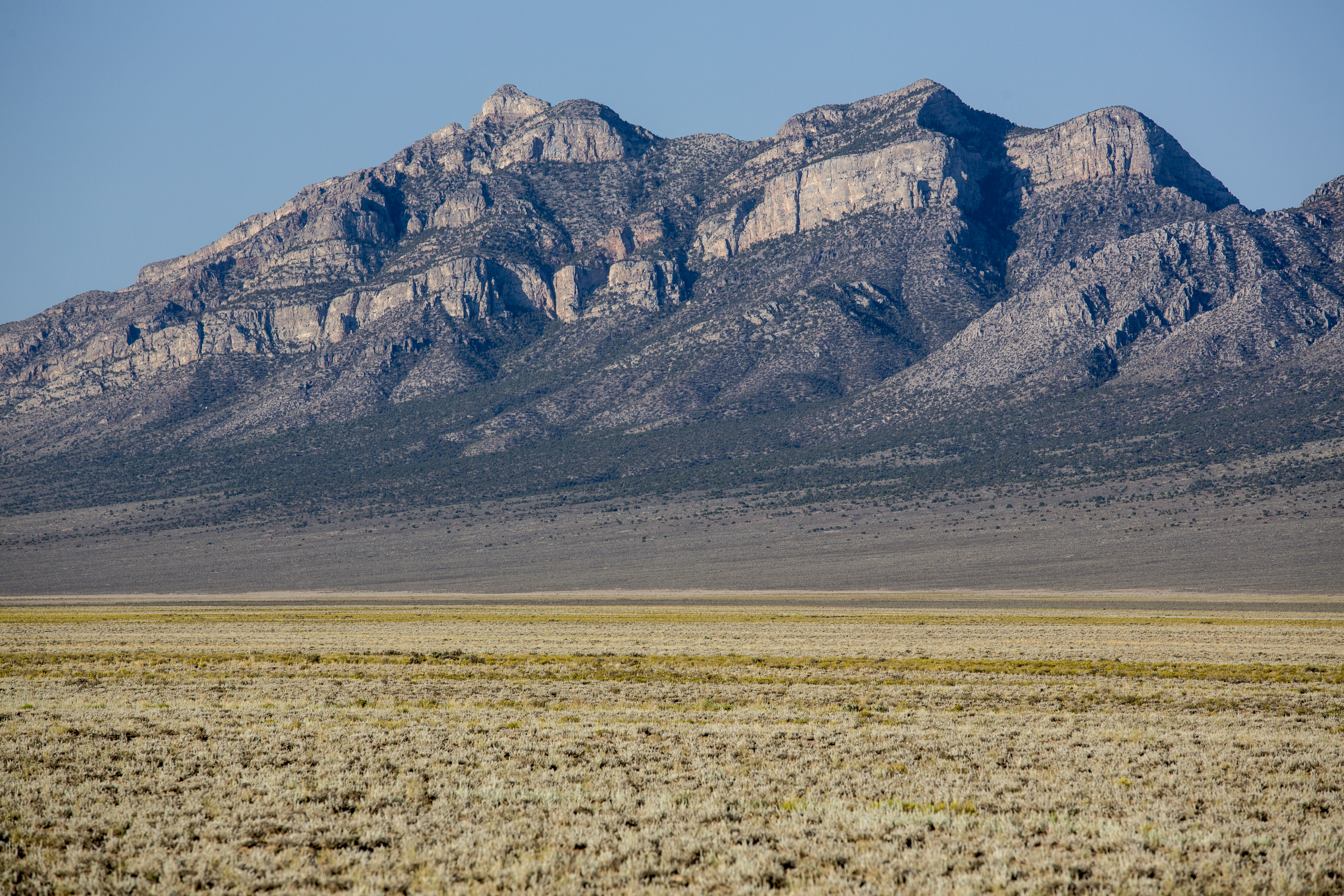
- Northeast aspect

Highest point
- Elevation: 8,768 ft (2,672 m)
- Prominence: 1,128 ft (344 m)
- Parent peak: Peak 8861
- Isolation: 5.28 mi (8.50 km)
- Coordinates: 37°49′27″N 115°35′59″W

Geography
- Location within Nevada Location within the United States
- Location: Basin and Range National Monument
- Country: United States of America
- State: Nevada
- County: Lincoln
- Parent range: Worthington Mountains; Great Basin Ranges
- Topo map: USGS Meeker Peak

Geology
- Mountain type: Fault block
- Rock type: Limestone

Meeker Peak is an 8,768-foot elevation (2,672 m) mountain summit located in Lincoln County, Nevada, United States.

== Description ==
Meeker Peak is the third-highest summit in the Worthington Mountains which are a subset of the Great Basin Ranges. This remote peak is set in the Basin and Range National Monument on land managed by the Bureau of Land Management. It is situated in the Worthington Mountains Wilderness, 6.5 miles (10.5 km) south of Worthington Peak, 105 miles (169 km) north of Las Vegas, and northeast of Nellis Air Force Base Complex. Topographic relief is significant as the summit rises 2,500 feet (760 meters) above Garden Valley in one mile, and 3,900 feet (1,200 meters) above Sand Springs Valley in three miles. This landform's toponym has been officially adopted by the U.S. Board on Geographic Names.

== Climate ==
Meeker Peak is set in the Great Basin Desert which has hot summers and cold winters. The desert is an example of a cold desert climate as the desert's elevation makes temperatures cooler than lower elevation deserts. Due to the high elevation and aridity, temperatures drop sharply after sunset. Summer nights are comfortably cool. Winter highs are generally above freezing, and winter nights are bitterly cold, with temperatures often dropping well below freezing.

== Gallery ==
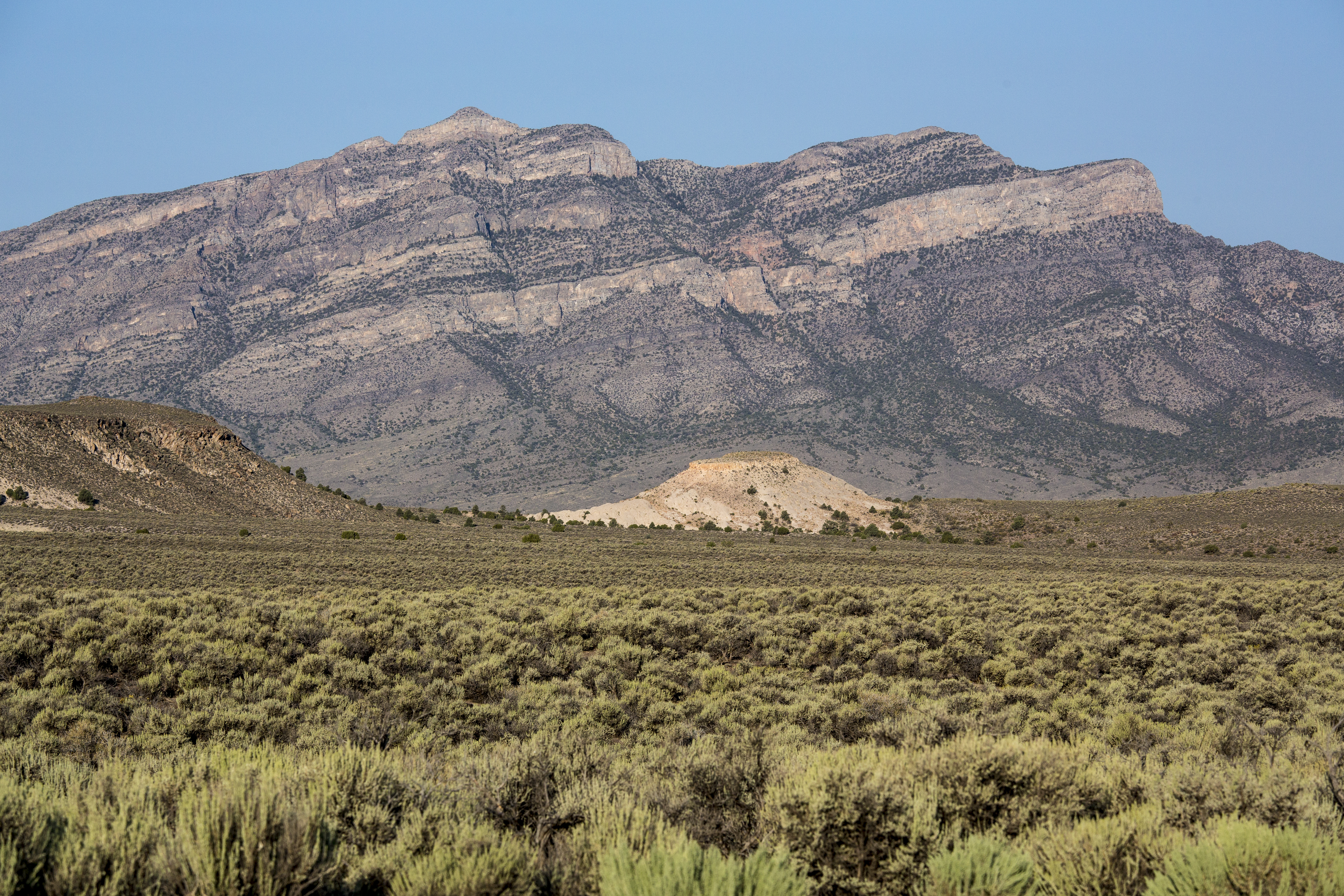
East aspect

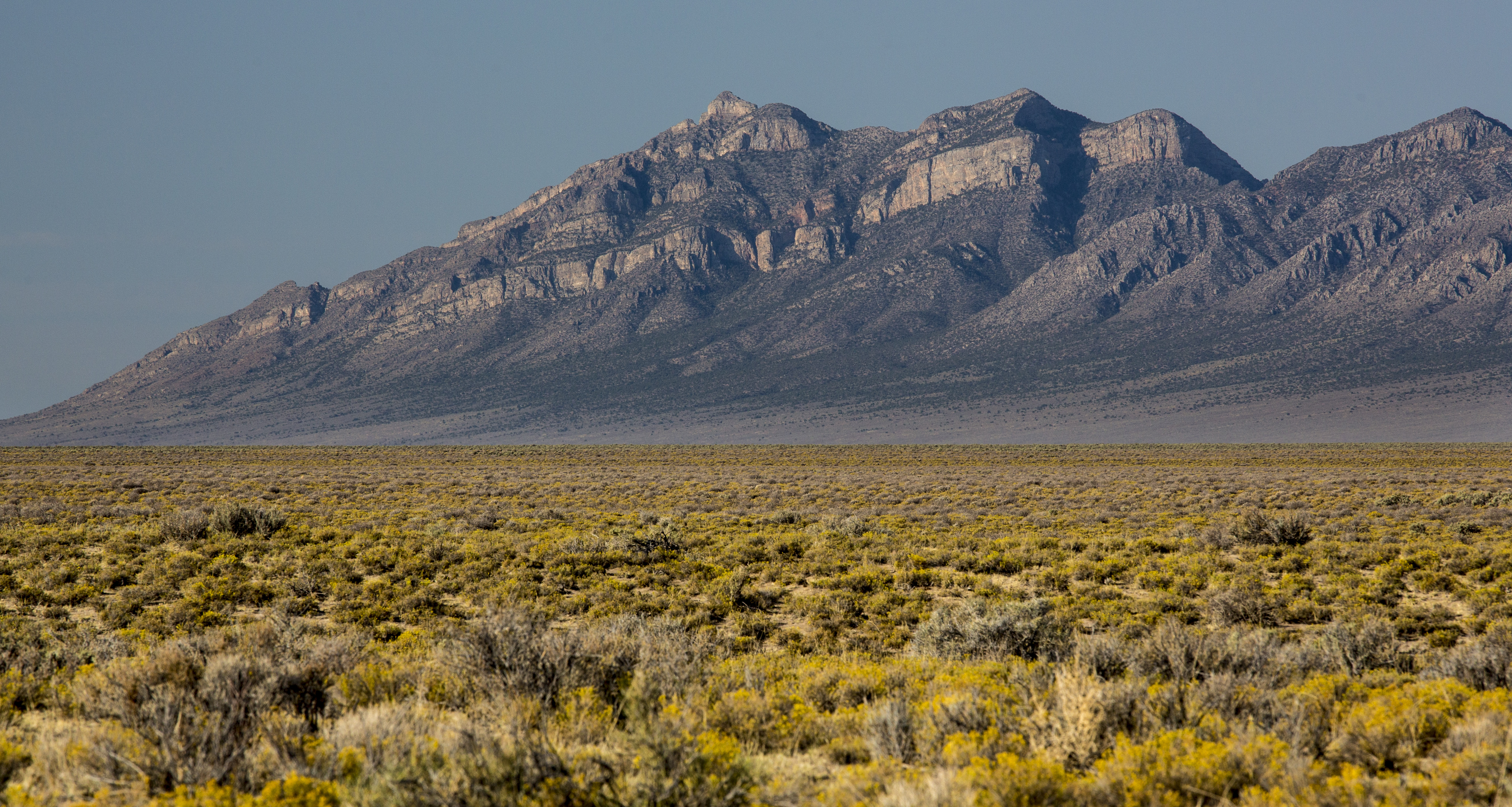
Northeast aspect

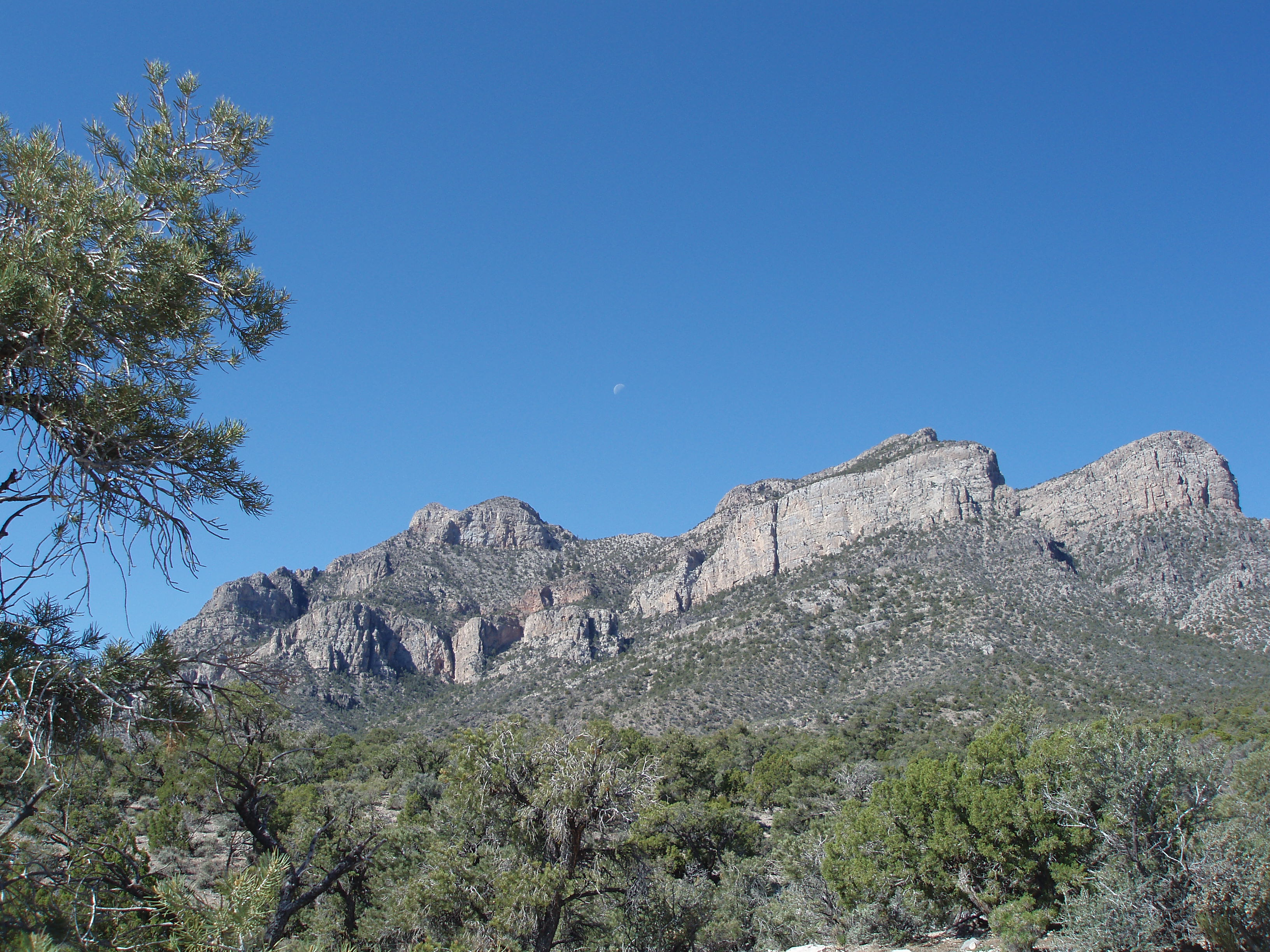
East aspect

== See also ==
- Great Basin
