= Slide Hollow =

Slide Hollow Slide Hollow Run

Physical characteristics
- Source
  - location: valley between Jones Mountain and Middle Ridge in Lewis Township, Union County, Pennsylvania
  - elevation: between 1,660 and 1,680 feet (506 and 512 m)
- Mouth
  - location: Panther Run in Hartley Township, Union County, Pennsylvania
  - coordinates: 40°57′54″N 77°10′30″W
  - elevation: 1,427 ft (435 m)
- Length: 1.2 mi (1.9 km)
- Basin size: 0.61 mi^{2} (1.6 km^{2})

Basin features
- Progression: Panther Run → North Branch Buffalo Creek → Buffalo Creek → West Branch Susquehanna River → Susquehanna River → Chesapeake Bay

Slide Hollow (also known as Slide Hollow Run) is a tributary of Panther Run in Union County, Pennsylvania, in the United States. It is approximately 1.2 miles (1.9 km) long and flows through Lewis Township and Hartley Township. The watershed of Slide Hollow has an area of 0.61 square miles (1.6 km^{2}). A total of 35 different dissolved elements have been detected in it. Wild trout also naturally reproduce within the stream and it has been stocked with trout in the past.

== Course ==
Slide Hollow begins in a valley between Jones Mountain and Middle Ridge in Lewis Township. It flows west-southwest and almost immediately enters Hartley Township. It continues flowing west-southwest for several tenths of a mile. The stream then turns west-northwest for a short distance before turning southwest. Several tenths of a mile further downstream, it reaches its confluence with Panther Run at The Hook.

Slide Hollow joins Panther Run 0.46 miles (0.74 km) upstream of its mouth.

== Hydrology (other than dissolved elements) ==
The field pH of Slide Hollow was once measured to be 6.85, while the lab pH was measured to be 6.51. The concentration of aluminum in the stream was measured to be 12 micrograms per litre (1.2×10^{−5} oz/cu ft). The concentration of dissolved oxygen was 9.39 milligrams per litre (0.00938 oz/cu ft), the specific conductivity was 24 micro-siemens per centimeter. The concentrations of sulfate, nitrate, and chloride were 0.495, 3.548, and 1.148, respectively.

== Dissolved elements ==
A total of 35 dissolved elements have been observed in the stream at concentrations above or at their detection limits.

In a 2006 study, the sodium and potassium concentrations in Slide Hollow were 317 and 710 micrograms per litre (0.000317 and 0.000709 oz/cu ft), respectively. The rubidium concentration was only 0.728 micrograms per litre (7.27×10^{−7} oz/cu ft), however. The magnesium concentration was 1,100 micrograms per litre (0.0011 oz/cu ft), and the calcium concentration was 1,300 micrograms per litre (0.0013 oz/cu ft). The strontium and barium concentrations were considerably lower, only 5.68 and 11.9 micrograms per litre (5.67×10^{−6} and 1.189×10^{−5} oz/cu ft).

In the 2006 study, the vanadium concentration in Slide Hollow was 0.1 micrograms per litre (1.00×10^{−7} oz/cu ft). The manganese concentration was 1.9 micrograms per litre (1.9×10^{−6} oz/cu ft), the cobalt concentration was 0.022 micrograms per litre (2.2×10^{−8} oz/cu ft), and the nickel and copper concentrations were both 0.8 micrograms per litre (8.0×10^{−7} oz/cu ft). The concentration of zinc was 2.7 micrograms per litre (2.7×10^{−6} oz/cu ft). The concentration of yttrium was 0.038 micrograms per litre (3.8×10^{−8} oz/cu ft) and the cadmium concentration was 0.02 micrograms per litre (2.0×10^{−8} oz/cu ft). All of the non-radioactive lanthanides were detected in the stream, with the exception of thulium and lutetium. Concentrations ranged from 0.001 micrograms per litre (1.00×10^{−9} oz/cu ft) (terbium and holmium) to 0.024 micrograms per litre (2.4×10^{−8} oz/cu ft) (cerium). The highest-numbered transition metal to be observed in concentrations above the detection limit was hafnium (0.002 micrograms per litre (2.0×10^{−9} oz/cu ft)). However, the concentration of lead was 0.03 micrograms per litre (3.0×10^{−8} oz/cu ft) and the uranium concentration was 0.006 micrograms per litre (6.0×10^{−9} oz/cu ft).

The silicon concentration was 2,300 micrograms per litre (0.0023 oz/cu ft). However, the arsenic concentration was only 0.08 micrograms per litre (8.0×10^{−8} oz/cu ft) and the antimony concentration was 0.01 micrograms per litre (1.00×10^{−8} oz/cu ft). The concentration of bromine was 12 micrograms per litre (1.2×10^{−5} oz/cu ft), while the iodine concentration was 1 microgram per litre (1.00×10^{−6} oz/cu ft).

== Geography, geology, and watershed ==
The elevation near the mouth of Slide Hollow is 1,427 feet (435 m) above sea level. The elevation of the stream's source is between 1,660 and 1,680 feet (506 and 512 m) above sea level.

The watershed of Slide Hollow has an area of 0.61 square miles (1.6 km^{2}). The stream and its valley are entirely within the United States Geological Survey quadrangle of Hartleton.

== History and biology ==
The valley of Slide Hollow was entered into the Geographic Names Information System on August 2, 1979. Its identifier in the Geographic Names Information System is 1187806. Slide Hollow is an unofficially named stream that is named after the valley through which it flows. The stream is also known as Slide Hollow Run.

Wild trout naturally reproduce in Slide Hollow from its headwaters downstream to its mouth. In the 1930s, the stream was known to be a good brook trout stream. It was also stocked with trout during this time.

In a 2006 survey, eight fish were observed in Slide Hollow.

== See also ==
- List of rivers of Pennsylvania
