= Black coal =

Black coal may refer to:

== Minerals ==
- Anthracite, a.k.a. black coal
- Bituminous coal or black coal, containing tar-like bitumen

== Other uses ==
- "Black Coal", a song on the 2008 Sanctus Real album We Need Each Other
- Chief Black Coal (c. 1840–1893), leader of the Northern Arapaho people

== See also ==
- Black Coal, Thin Ice, a 2014 Chinese film
- Black coral
- Black coal equivalent (BCE)
- Coal Black (disambiguation)
- Black (disambiguation)
- Coal (disambiguation)
