= Panther Run =

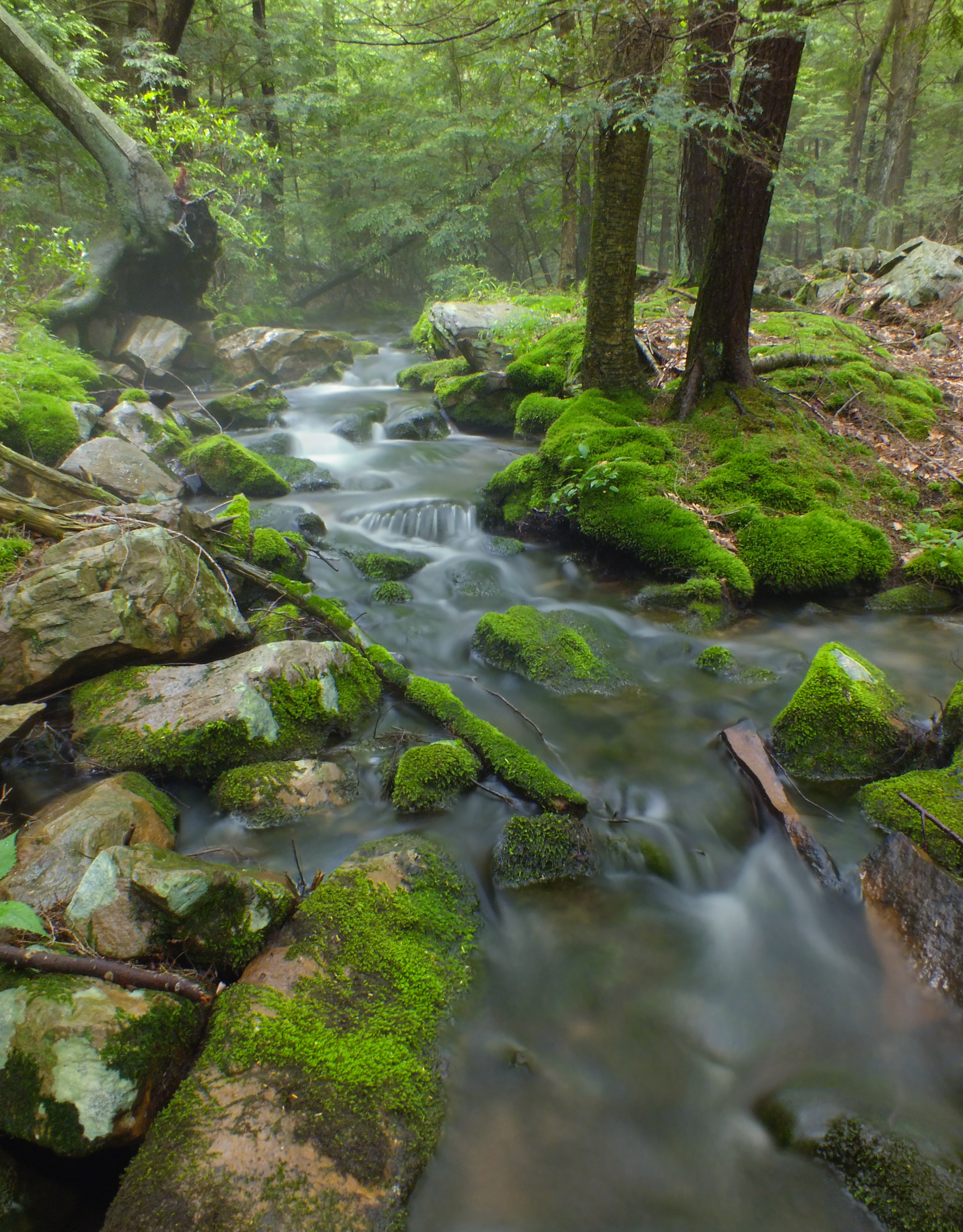
- Panther Run in The Hook Natural Area

Physical characteristics
- Source
  - location: valley in Haines Township, Centre County, Pennsylvania
  - elevation: between 1,780 and 1,800 feet (540 and 550 m)
- Mouth
  - location: North Branch Buffalo Creek in Hartley Township, Union County, Pennsylvania
  - coordinates: 40°57′39″N 77°10′49″W
  - elevation: 1,289 ft (393 m)
- Length: 3.9 mi (6.3 km)
- Basin size: 3.79 mi^{2} (9.8 km^{2})

Basin features
- Progression: North Branch Buffalo Creek → Buffalo Creek → West Branch Susquehanna River → Susquehanna River → Chesapeake Bay
- Tributaries
  - left: Slide Hollow

Panther Run is a tributary of North Branch Buffalo Creek in Centre County and Union County, Pennsylvania, in the United States. It is approximately 3.9 miles (6.3 km) long and flows through Haines Township in Centre County and Hartley Township in Union County. The watershed of the stream has an area of 3.79 square miles (9.8 km^{2}). The stream's headwaters are in a forest spring and it has one named tributary. Virtually all of the watershed is forested. In addition to hardwood forests and white pine, rhododendrons, sedges, grasses, and clubmosses occur in the stream's vicinity.

== Course ==
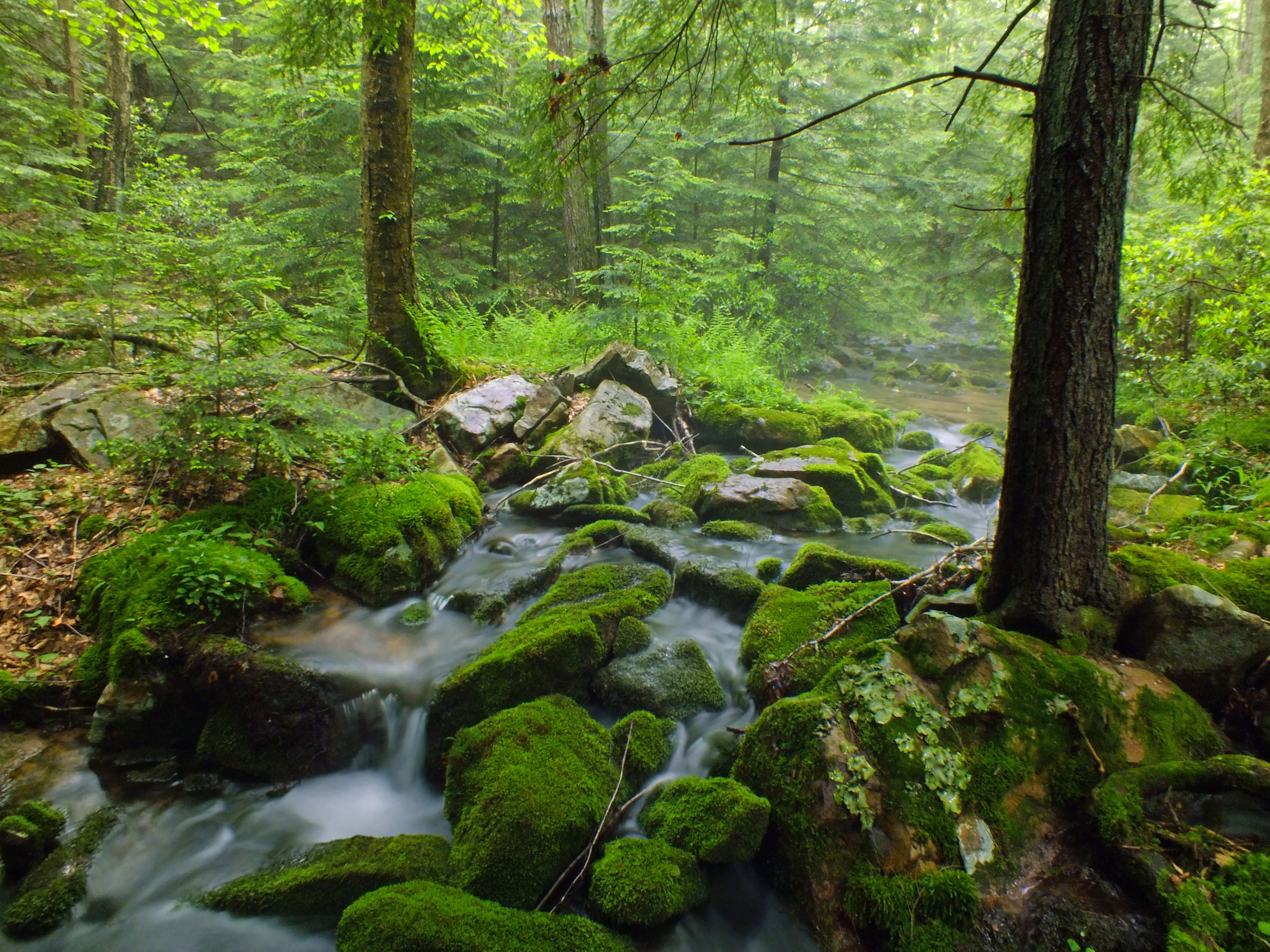
Panther Run in The Hook Natural Area

Panther Run begins in a valley in Haines Township, Centre County. It flows east-northeast for a few tenths of a mile before entering Hartley Township, Union County. Here, the stream continues to flow east-northeast for a few miles. It then begins flowing southeast past Buck Ridge. The stream then enters The Hook, where it receives Slide Hollow, its only named tributary, from the left. It then turns southwest for a few tenths of a mile before reaching its confluence with North Branch Buffalo Creek across from Dogback Mountain.

Panther Run joins North Branch Buffalo Creek 9.42 miles (15.16 km) upstream of its mouth.

=== Tributaries ===
Panther Run has one named tributary, which is known as Slide Hollow. Slide Hollow joins Panther Run 0.46 miles (0.74 km) upstream of its mouth and its watershed has an area of 0.61 square miles (1.6 km^{2}).

== Geography and geology ==
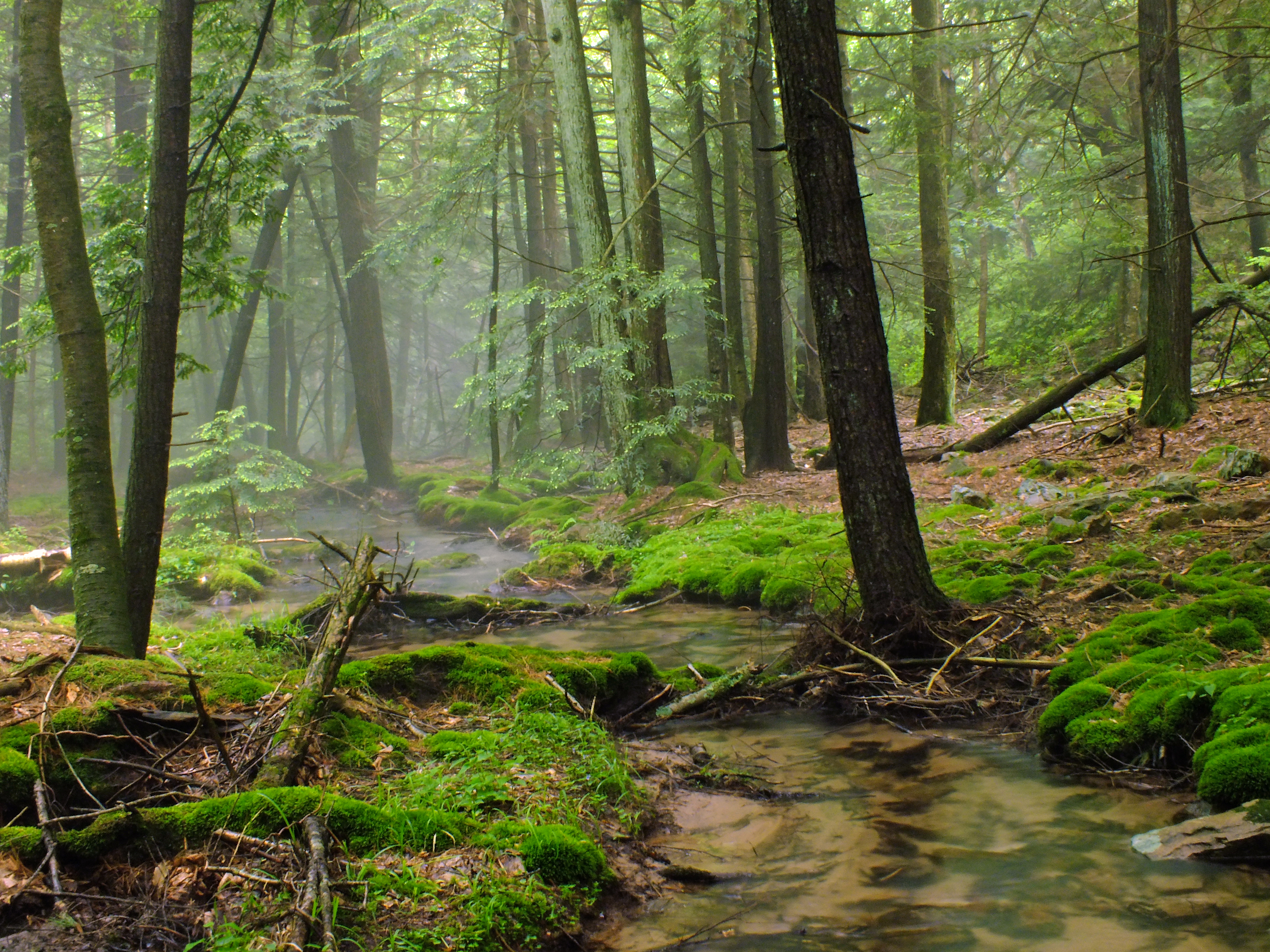
Panther Run in the woods

The elevation near the mouth of Panther Run is 1,289 feet (393 m) above sea level. The elevation of the stream's source is between 1,780 and 1,800 feet (540 and 550 m) above sea level.

The headwaters of Panther Run are in a spring on the forest floor. The stream is a "sizable stream" in some reaches. However, it is considerably smaller than North Branch Buffalo Creek, which it is a tributary of.

== Watershed ==
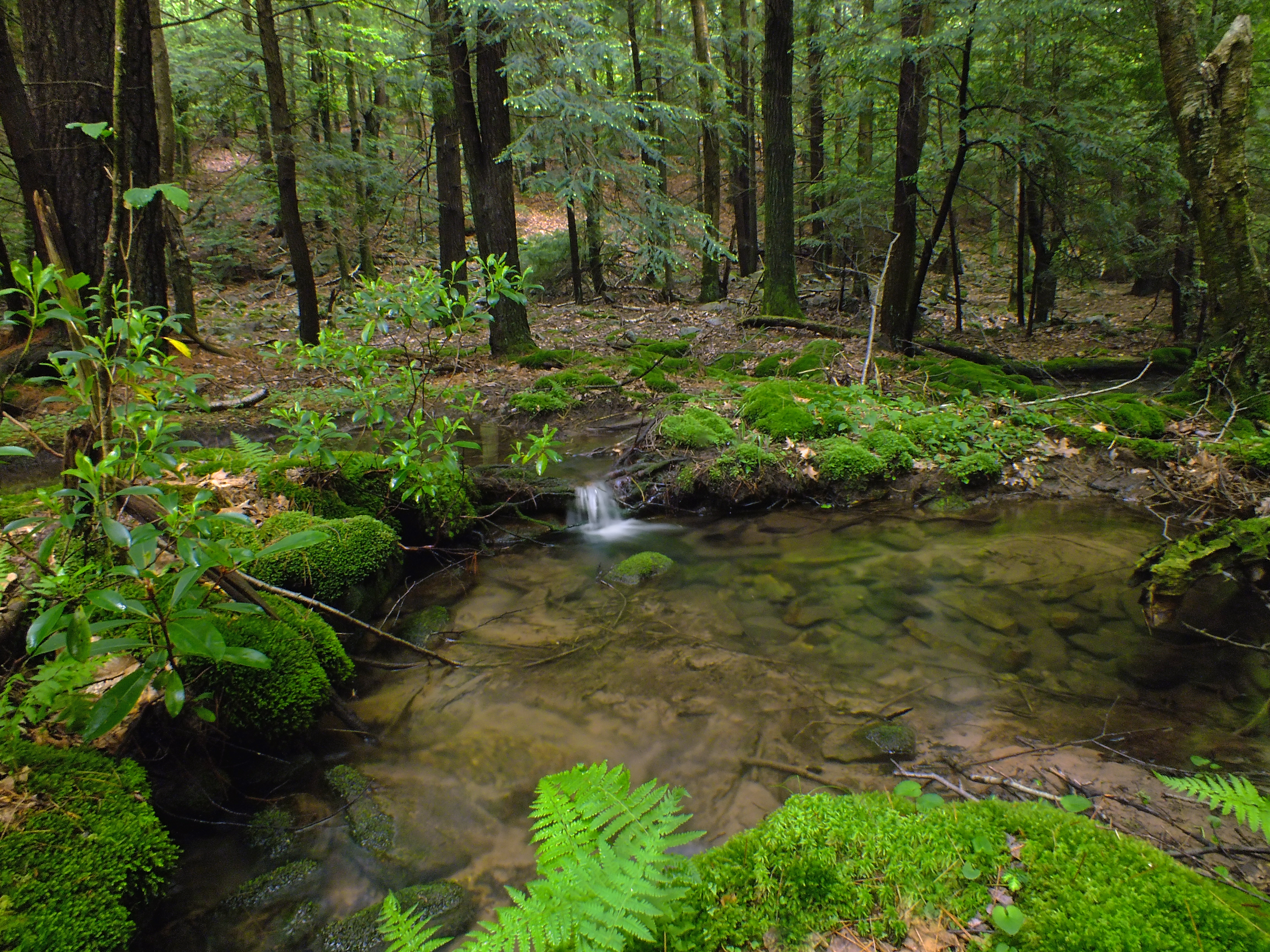
Another view of Panther Run

The watershed of Panther Run has an area of 3.79 square miles (9.8 km^{2}). The stream is entirely within the United States Geological Survey quadrangle of Hartleton. The watershed makes up approximately 2 percent of the Buffalo Creek drainage basin.

About 100 percent of the watershed of Panther Run is on forested land.

== History and recreation ==
Panther Run was entered into the Geographic Names Information System on August 2, 1979. Its identifier in the Geographic Names Information System is 1183261.

In a 2008 report, the watershed of Panther Run was ranked eighth amongst sub-watersheds in the Buffalo Creek drainage basin for restoration priority.

A hiking trail in The Hook Natural Area is located along Panther Run and also crosses the stream several times.

== Biology ==
Wild trout naturally reproduce in Panther Run from its upper reaches downstream to its mouth. The stream's headwaters are designated as a Wilderness Trout Stream.

In the upper reaches, Panther Run's streambanks are flanked by hardwood forest. Eventually, this gives way to white pine and various sedges and grasses. In other reaches, the understory along the stream is dominated by rhododendrons. Additionally, patches of a clubmoss known as Lycopodium annotinum occur close to it.

== See also ==
- Coal Run (North Branch Buffalo Creek), next tributary of North Branch Buffalo Creek going downstream
- List of rivers of Pennsylvania
