= Worthington Peak =

Mountain summit in Lincoln County, Nevada, United States

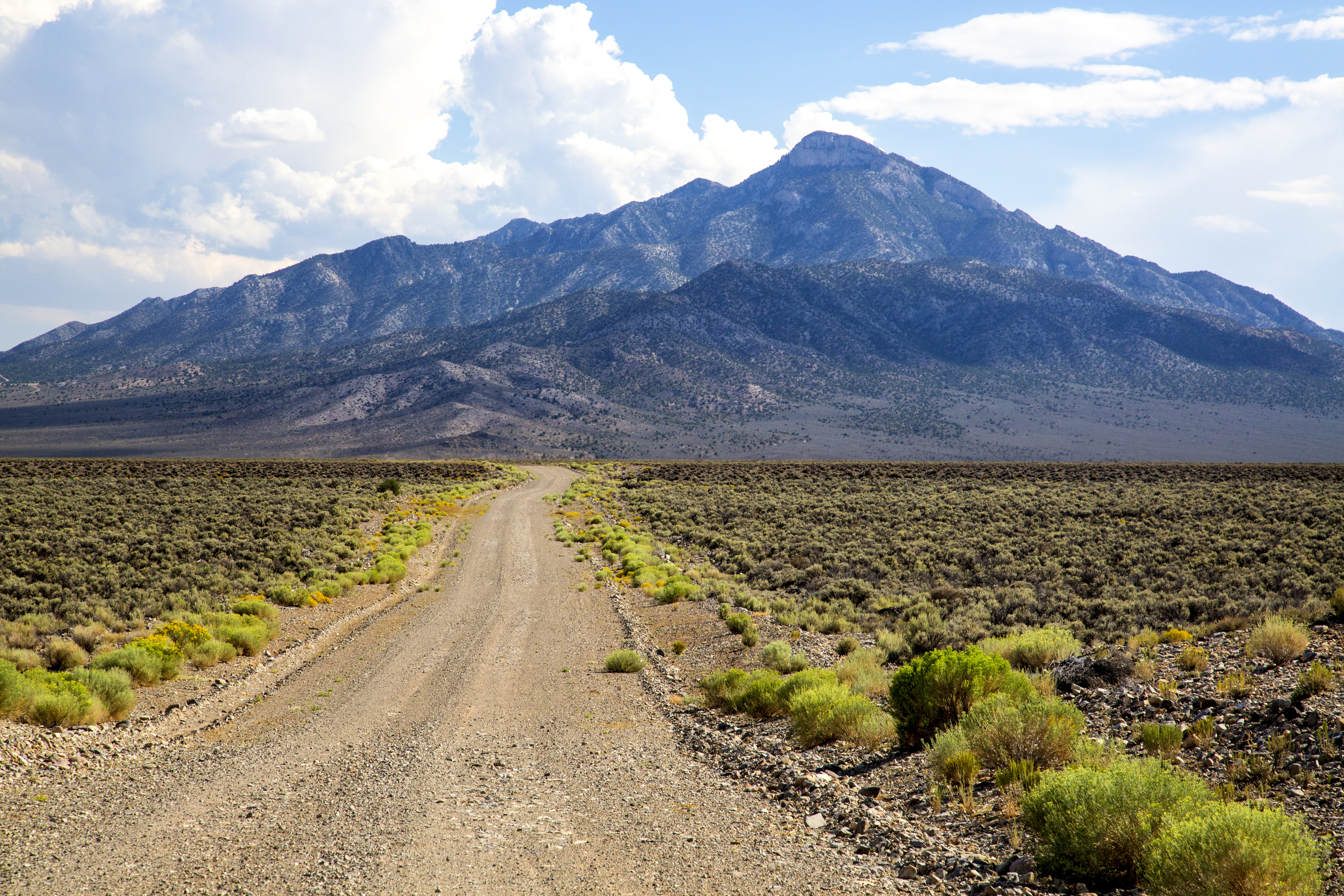
- North aspect

Highest point
- Elevation: 8,968 ft (2,733 m)
- Prominence: 3,088 ft (941 m)
- Parent peak: Peak 9015
- Isolation: 11.14 mi (17.93 km)
- Coordinates: 37°55′04″N 115°36′42″W

Naming
- Etymology: Rossiter Worthington Raymond

Geography
- Location within Nevada Location within the United States
- Location: Basin and Range National Monument
- Country: United States of America
- State: Nevada
- County: Lincoln
- Parent range: Worthington Mountains; Great Basin Ranges
- Topo map: USGS Worthington Peak

Geology
- Rock age: Silurian
- Mountain type: Fault block
- Rock type: Limestone

Climbing
- Easiest route: class 2 hiking

Worthington Peak is an 8,968-foot elevation (2,733 m) mountain summit located in Lincoln County, Nevada, United States.

== Description ==
Worthington Peak is the highest summit in the Worthington Mountains which are a subset of the Great Basin Ranges. This remote peak is set in the Basin and Range National Monument on land managed by the Bureau of Land Management. It is situated on the boundary of the Worthington Mountains Wilderness, 6.5 miles (10.5 km) north of Meeker Peak, 112 miles (180 km) north of Las Vegas, and northeast of Nellis Air Force Base Complex. Topographic relief is significant as the summit rises 3,000 feet (910 meters) above Garden Valley in two miles, and 3,400 feet (1,000 meters) above Sand Springs Valley in three miles. The peak is composed primarily of limestone with some sandstone, with abundant fossils of the Silurian within the limestone. This landform's toponym has been officially adopted by the U.S. Board on Geographic Names. The name was applied by the Wheeler Survey and has been printed in publications since 1877.

== Climate ==
Worthington Peak is set in the Great Basin Desert which has hot summers and cold winters. The desert is an example of a cold desert climate as the desert's elevation makes temperatures cooler than lower elevation deserts. Due to the high elevation and aridity, temperatures drop sharply after sunset. Summer nights are comfortably cool. Winter highs are generally above freezing, and winter nights are bitterly cold, with temperatures often dropping well below freezing.

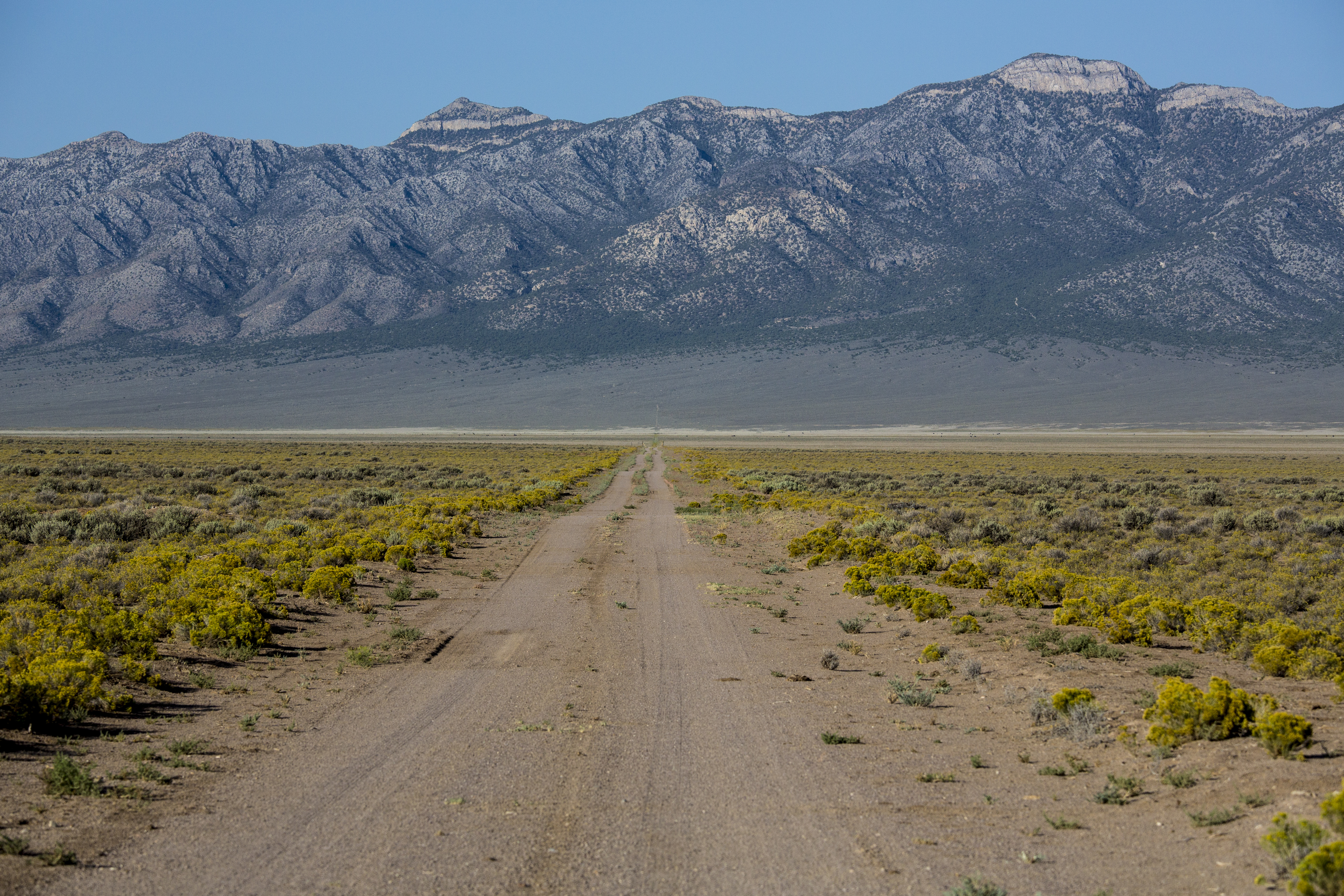
Peak 8881 (left of center) and Worthington Peak to right, east aspect from Garden Valley

== See also ==
- Great Basin
