= Coal Run =

Coal Run may refer to:

- Coal Run, Ohio
- Coal Run (Archers Fork tributary), a stream in Ohio
- Coal Run (North Branch Buffalo Creek), a stream in Union County, Pennsylvania
- Coal Run (novel), a novel by Tawni O'Dell
- Coal Run (Shamokin Creek), a stream in Northumberland County, Pennsylvania
- Coal Run Village, Kentucky, a city in Pike County, Kentucky, United States
