= Coal Black =

Coal Black or coalblack may refer to:

- The color black
- "Coal Black Rose", an American folk song
- Coal Black and de Sebben Dwarfs, a 1943 Warner Brothers cartoon infamous for its racial stereotypes
- Coalblack and the Seven Giants, a 1965 stage show by King Palmer
- Coalblack, a Narnia character; see List of The Chronicles of Narnia characters

== See also ==
- Black coal (disambiguation)
- Black (disambiguation)
- Coal (disambiguation)
