= Coal Ridge =

Coal Ridge and Coalridge may refer to:

- Coalridge, West Virginia, an unincorporated community in Kanawha County
- Coal Ridge High School, in Garfield County, Colorado
- Coal Ridge Baptist Church and Cemetery, in Knoxville, Iowa
