= Coal Island =

Coal Island may refer to:

- Coal Island, New Zealand, a small island in southwestern New Zealand
- Coal Island, South Georgia, a small sub-Antarctic island close to South Georgia Island

== See also ==
- Coalisland, town in County Tyrone, Northern Ireland
