= Worthington Mountains =

Mountain range in Nevada, United States

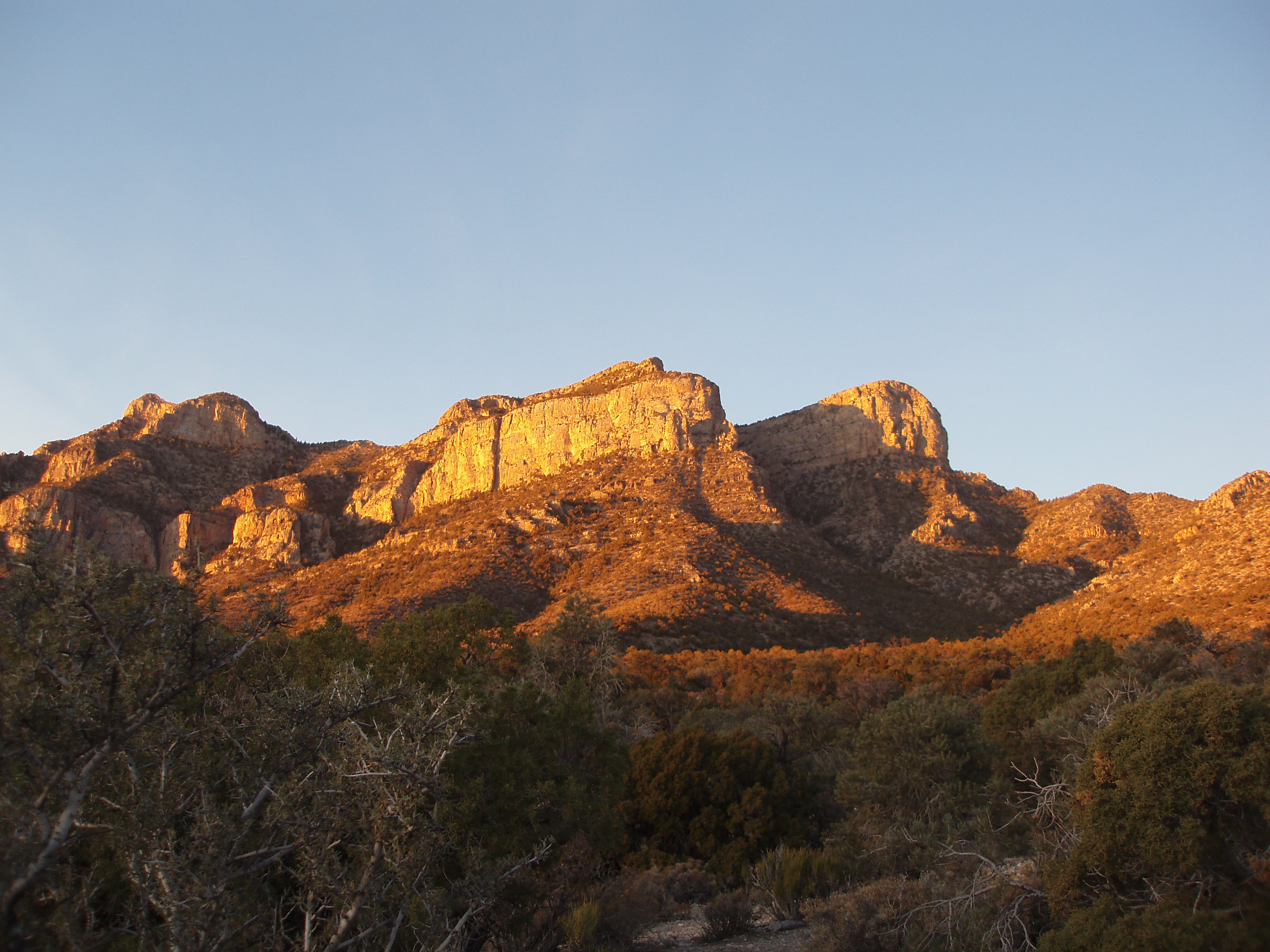
- Worthington Mountains Wilderness at Sunset

Highest point
- Peak: Worthington Peak
- Elevation: 2,738 m (8,983 ft)
- Coordinates: 37°55′4″N 115°36′41″W

Dimensions
- Length: 12 mi (19 km) N-S
- Width: 2.8 mi (4.5 km) E-W
- Area: 25 mi^{2} (65 km^{2})

Geography
- Location within Nevada
- Country: United States
- State: Nevada
- District: Lincoln County
- Range coordinates: 37°53′6″N 115°36′23″W
- Topo map: USGS Worthington Peak

The Worthington Mountains is a small 12 miles (19 km) long north–south trending mountain range in northwestern Lincoln County, Nevada. The range is bounded by the Sand Spring Valley to the west and Garden Valley to the east. The Quinn Canyon Range lies to the northwest, the Golden Gate Range lies to the east and the Timpahute Range lies to the south and southeast.

The range has two prominent peaks: Worthington Peak at 8,983 feet (2,738 m) near the north end and Meeker Peak at 8,766 feet (2,672 m) near the south end. The surrounding basins have elevations of 4,900 to 5,900 feet (1,500 to 1,800 m). There is no surface water and few springs within the range.

The Worthington Mountains are within the Basin and Range National Monument, created by President Barack Obama in 2015.

== Geology and mining ==
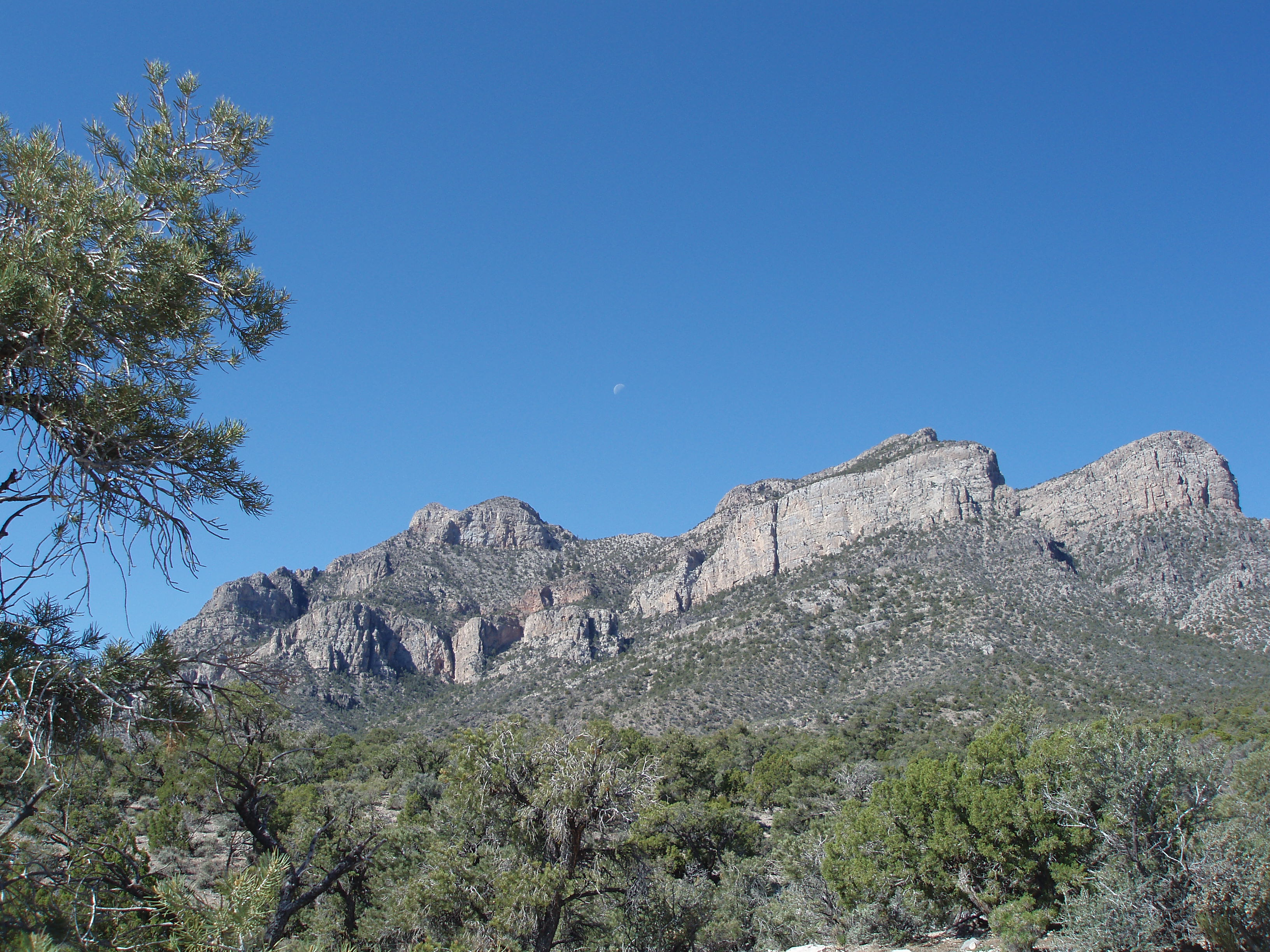
The Worthington Range from the east. Meeker Peak is on the left.

The Freiberg district on the northeast end of the range, located northeast of Worthington Peak, has had a long history of mining. The bedrock in the area is Pogonip Group limestone and dolomites of Ordovician age which strike north south and dip 20° to the west. The sedimentary rocks have been faulted and intruded by numerous felsic intrusives. The old Freiberg mine was worked for gold and silver starting in 1865. Later the New Freiberg mine was worked with underground and open pit methods for silver, lead, zinc and copper from 1919 through 1948.

The Upper Devonian Guilmette Formation outcrops in the southern portion of the range. The Guilmette contains exposures of the Alamo Breccia related to the Alamo Impact which is approximately centered in the Timpahute Range some 12 miles (19 km) to the south.

== Flora and fauna ==
The lower elevations of the mountains are characterized by a sagebrush community and other shrubs. The middle elevations are primarily forested by singleleaf pinyon pine (Pinus monophylla), Utah Juniper (Juniperus osteosperma), and mountain mahogany (Cercpcarpus ledifolius). At the higher elevations are bristlecone pine (Pinus longaeva) and, in two small areas south of Worthington Peak, ponderosa pine (Pinus ponderosa).

Large mammals found within the range are mule deer (Odocoileus hemionus), pronghorn (Antilocapra americana), desert bighorn sheep (Ovis canadensis nelsoni), bobcat (Lynx rufus baileyi), and mountain lion (Felis concolor).

== Wilderness area ==
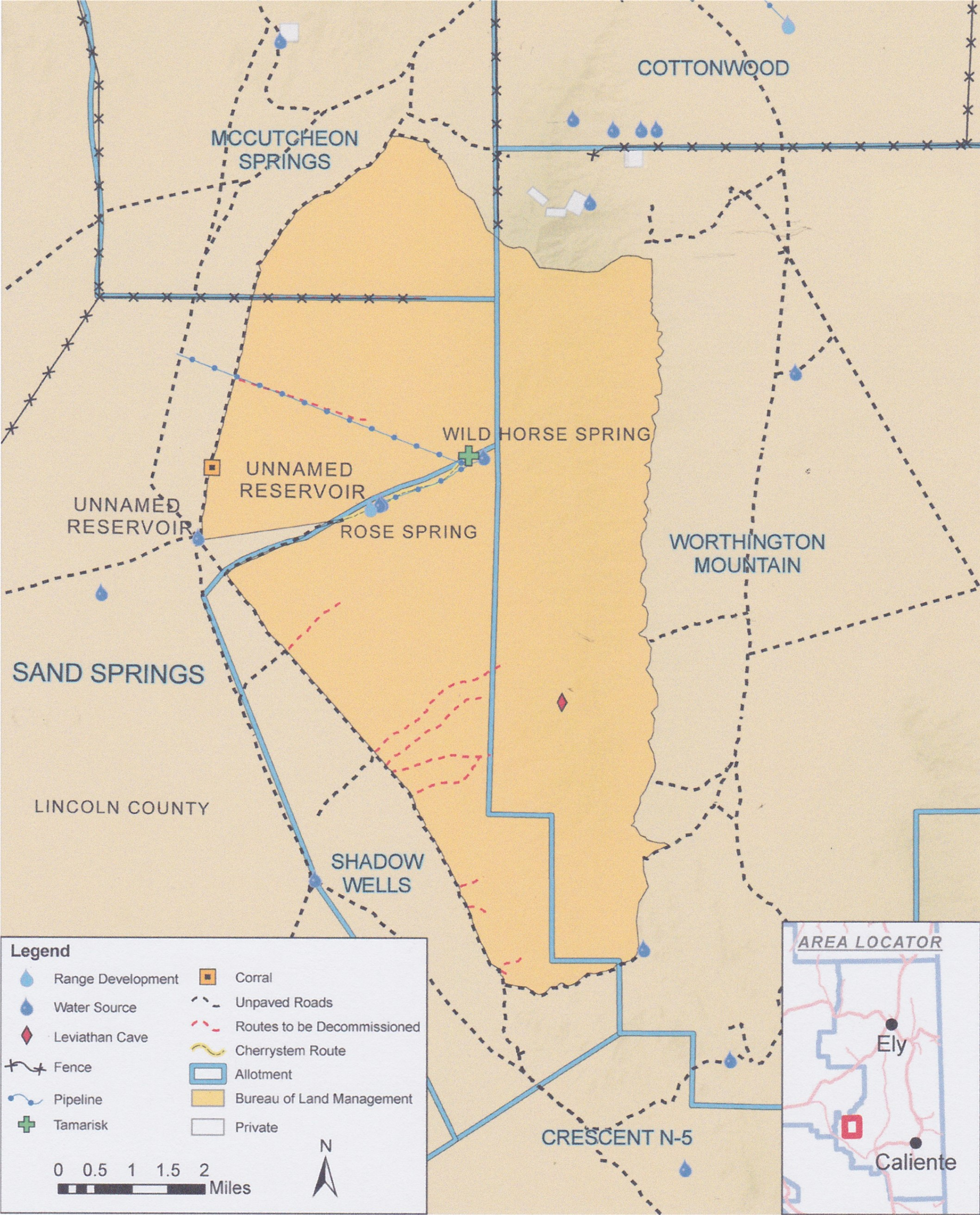
Worthington Mountains Wilderness, Nevada

Worthington Mountains Wilderness Area was created by the U.S. Congress in 2004 and consists of most of the Worthington Mountains. The wilderness area encompasses 30,664 acres (124.09 km^{2}) of the range and the extensive alluvial fans on the western slopes of the mountains. Worthington Peak is on the northern border of the wilderness. The northernmost part of the range, north of Worthington Peak, includes an old mining area and is outside the wilderness. The wilderness ranges from 4,900 feet (1,500 m) to 8,968 feet (2,733 m) in elevation.

The Bureau of Land Management says that "no other Nevada area expresses the wilderness characteristics of stark beauty, chaotic topography, and remoteness quite as well as the Worthington Wilderness." The terrain consists of jagged peaks and ridges, narrow canyons, and steep escarpments sloping down to the washes and the desert floor.

The most notable attraction of the wilderness is probably Leviathan Cave just northeast of Meeker Peak. The cave is reached by a difficult informal two-plus miles long trail which climbs the east side of the range. The cave is located at 7,800 feet (2,400 m) in elevation and entrance requires ropes to descend a 30-foot vertical drop. The cave contains stalactites and stalagmites and is about 350 yards (320 m) long. In the 2000–2010 period, about 40 people annually visited the cave.
