= North Branch Buffalo Creek =

River in Pennsylvania, USA

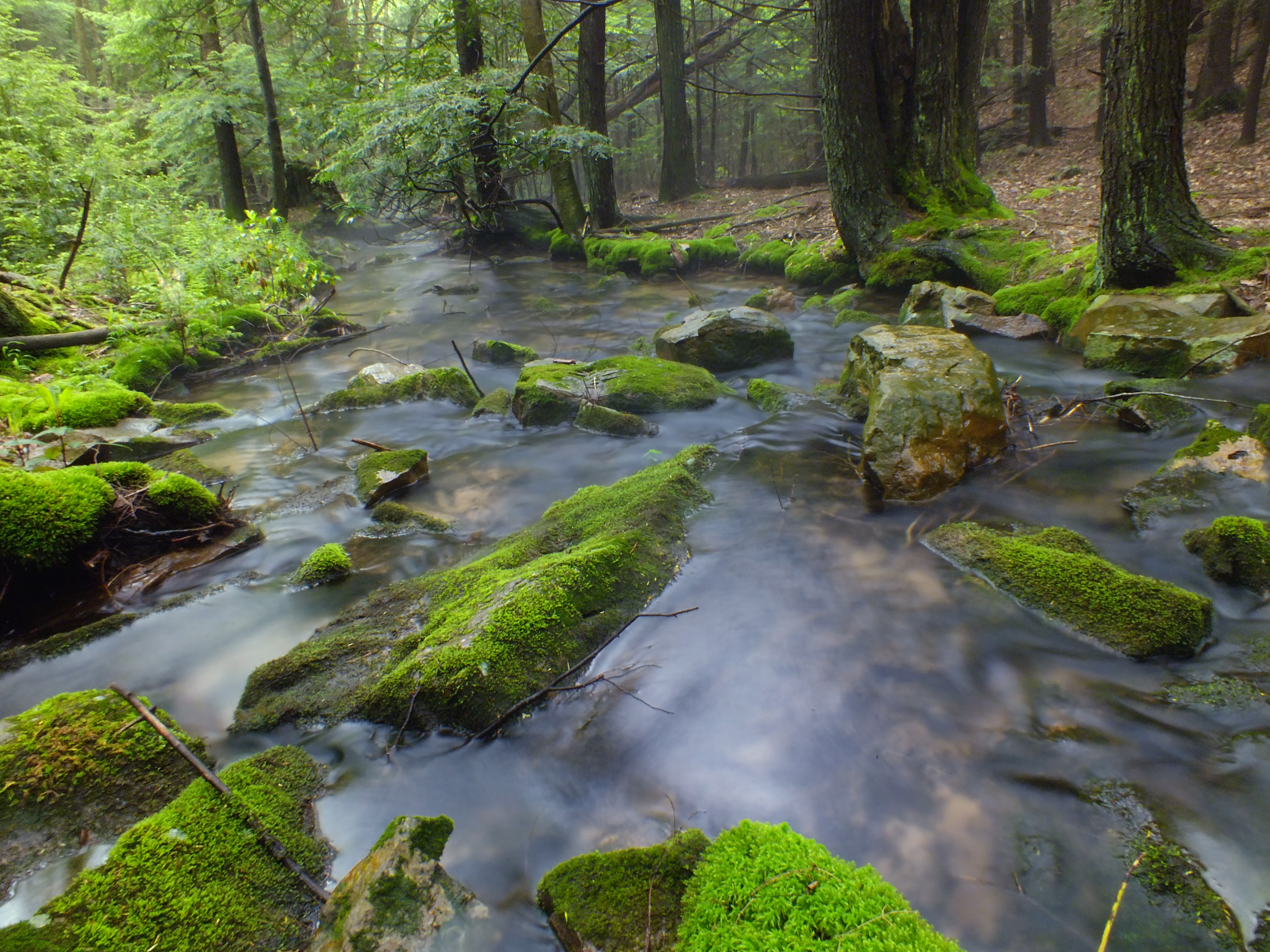
- North Branch Buffalo Creek in The Hook Natural Area

Physical characteristics
- Source
  - location: wetland in Haines Township, Centre County, Pennsylvania
  - elevation: between 1,720 and 1,740 feet (520 and 530 m)
- Mouth
  - location: Buffalo Creek in West Buffalo Township, Union County, Pennsylvania
  - coordinates: 40°55′54″N 77°02′10″W
  - elevation: 531 ft (162 m)
- Length: 13.5 mi (21.7 km)
- Basin size: 22.9 mi^{2} (59 km^{2})

Basin features
- Progression: Buffalo Creek → West Branch Susquehanna River → Susquehanna River → Chesapeake Bay
- Tributaries
  - left: Panther Run
  - right: Coal Run

North Branch Buffalo Creek is a tributary of Buffalo Creek in Centre County and Union County, in Pennsylvania, in the United States. It is approximately 13.5 miles (21.7 km) long and flows through Haines Township in Centre County and Hartley Township, Lewis Township, and West Buffalo Township. The watershed of the creek has an area of 22.9 square miles (59 km^{2}). The creek has two named tributaries: Panther Run and Coal Run. Some streams in the watershed are impacted by nutrients, sedimentation, and siltation. The creek generally flows through mountainous terrain and has a sinuous channel. Rock formations made of sandstone are in its watershed and rock containing carbonate minerals is at its headwaters.

Roughly seven eighths of the watershed of North Branch Buffalo Creek is on forested land, but agricultural land such as row crops and pastures occurs, as do impervious surfaces. The creek was historically used as water power for a number of mills and logging and agriculture have also been historically done in its watershed. It passes through a water supply reservoir known as the Mifflinburg Reservoir. A number of bridges have also been constructed across it.

The drainage basin of North Branch Buffalo Creek is designated as Exceptional Value waters in one reach, a High-Quality Coldwater Fishery in another reach, and a Migratory Fishery throughout. Several types of trout inhabit it, both naturally and through stocking. The creek has a healthy population of benthic macroinvertebrates. It flows through The Hook Natural Area and Bald Eagle State Forest. A number of hiking trails are in its vicinity.

== Course ==
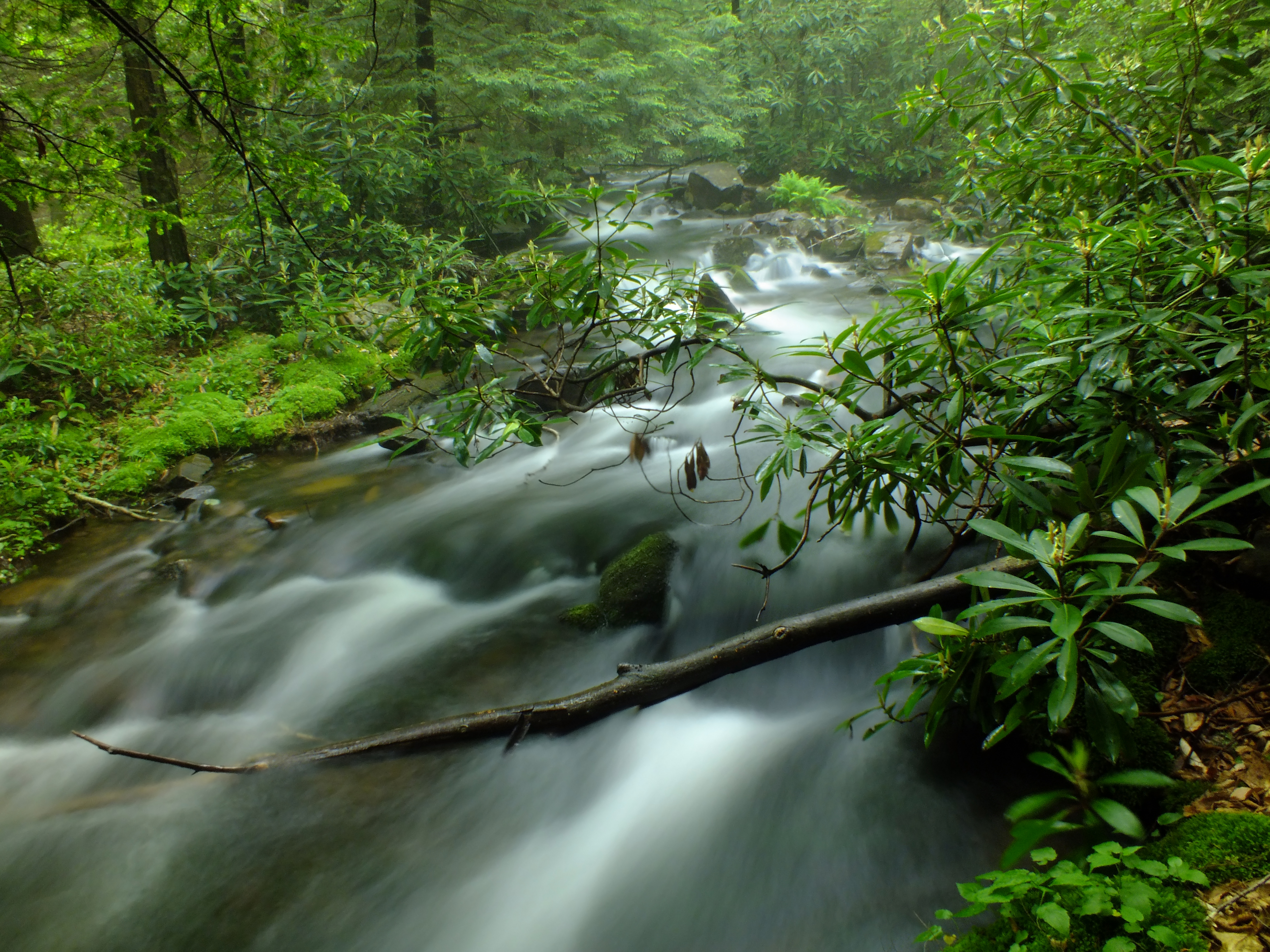
Another view of North Branch Buffalo Creek

North Branch Buffalo Creek begins in a wetland in Haines Township, Centre County. It flows east-northeast for several tenths of a mile through a deep, narrow valley before exiting Haines Township and Centre County.

Upon exiting Centre County, North Branch Buffalo Creek enters Hartley Township, Union County. It continues flowing east-northeast through the valley for a few miles. The creek then flows between Buck Ridge and Dogback Mountain before turning south-southeast for a few tenths of a mile. In this reach, it receives Panther Run, its first named tributary, from the left. It also passes by Ice Spring and the western edge of Jones Mountain. The creek then turns east for more than a mile, flowing between Jones Mountain and Little Mountain. It then reaches Lewis Township and turns east-southeast. After some distance, the creek turns northeast and then east-northeast, passing through the Mifflinburg Reservoir. Several tenths of a mile further downstream, its valley broadens considerably and it flows east for a few miles. The creek then turns south-southeast for a few miles, passing by Lake McClure and receiving the tributary Coal Run from the right. It then turns southeast for several tenths of a mile before reaching its confluence with Buffalo Creek.

North Branch Buffalo Creek joins Buffalo Creek 13.34 miles (21.47 km) upstream of its mouth.

=== Tributaries ===
North Branch Buffalo Creek has two named tributaries: Coal Run and Panther Run. Coal Run joins North Branch Buffalo Creek 0.46 miles (0.74 km) upstream of its mouth and its watershed has an area of 5.33 square miles (13.8 km^{2}). Panther Run joins North Branch Buffalo Creek 9.42 miles (15.16 km) upstream of its mouth and its watershed has an area of 3.79 square miles (9.8 km^{2}).

== Hydrology ==
Some stream reaches in the watershed of North Branch Buffalo Creek are designated as impaired. The causes of impairment are nutrients and sedimentation/siltation, while the source of impairment is grazing-related agriculture. However, it is not impacted by acid deposition, even though the nearby Buffalo Creek is. On November 29, 1945, the discharge of the creek upstream of the Mifflinburg Reservoir was measured to be 6.28 cubic feet per second (0.178 m^{3}/s).

In 2000, the load of sediment in North Branch Buffalo Creek was 1,173,659 pounds (532,363 kg) and in 2008, it was 1,147,538 pounds (520,514 kg). This equates to a load of around 100 pounds per acre (110 kg/ha). However, the annual load could be reduced by up to 61.31 percent to 443,963 pounds (201,378 kg). In 2000, a total of 588,714 pounds (267,036 kg) of sediment per year came from streambank erosion, while 188,406 pounds (85,460 kg) came from row crops, 20,202 pounds (9,163 kg) came from hay/pastures, 6,835 pounds (3,100 kg) came from low-density urban land, and 4,546 pounds (2,062 kg) came from unpaved roads. Additionally, 47 pounds (21 kg) came from high-density urban land and 364,909 pounds (165,520 kg) came from other sources.

In 2000, the nitrogen load in North Branch Buffalo Creek was 42,881 pounds (19,450 kg), while in 2008, it was 42,554 pounds (19,302 kg). This equates to a load of less than 5 pounds per acre (5.6 kg/ha). However, in the future, the load could be reduced by 28.62 percent to 30,377 pounds (13,779 kg) per year. The phosphorus load of North Branch Buffalo Creek was 2,107 pounds (956 kg) in 2000 and 2,079 pounds (943 kg) in 2008. This equates to slightly under 0.2 pounds per acre (0.22 kg/ha). The load of phosphorus could be reduced by 31.99 percent to 1,414 pounds (641 kg) per year in the future.

The waters of a stream in the watershed of North Branch Buffalo Creek in The Hook Natural Area are a dark amber color. This coloration is caused by decaying organic matter in the groundwater that flows into the creek.

== Geography and geology ==
The elevation near the mouth of North Branch Buffalo Creek is 531 feet (162 m) above sea level. The elevation of the creek's source is between 1,720 and 1,740 feet (520 and 530 m) above sea level. The creek flows in a generally easterly direction, though its route is circuitous.

The headwaters of North Branch Buffalo Creek are on rock containing carbonate minerals, such as limestone and dolomite. Jökulhlaup surfaces occur in the vicinity of the creek. The surface consists of a northern arm and a southern arm, with the former being younger than the latter, though both date to the middle Pleistocene. The surface is bouldery and has a low gradient. An ice-dammed lake also used to exist on the creek. It had a volume of 0.215 square kilometers (0.083 sq mi), a surface area of 3.56 square kilometers (1.37 sq mi), and a depth of 60 meters (200 ft). Mountains in the vicinity of the creek include Jones Mountain and Buffalo Mountain.

North Branch Buffalo Creek flows through a narrow valley surrounded by steep hills in mountainous terrain. Its channel is sinuous and flows through rock formations consisting of sandstone.

In the northern arm of its jökulhlaup surface, North Branch Buffalo Creek has a braided channel. The channel has only cut slightly into the surface in this reach. The creek has been designated as a High-Gradient Clearwater Creek. A gravelly loam known as the Elkinsville gravelly loam occurs near North Branch Buffalo Creek, as well as many other major steams in Union County. The top 6 to 8 inches (15 to 20 cm) of this soil are a pale brown, porous loam that contains some organic matter. From the bottom of this layer down to 15 inches (38 cm), the soil becomes a light yellow-brown. Further down, the soil becomes heavier and contains less gravel. Below 36 inches (91 cm), it is a yellowish, heavy loam or crumbly clay loam.

A total of 0.1 miles (0.16 km) of streams in the watershed of North Branch Buffalo Creek have fences. A total of 0.2 miles (0.32 km) of streams contain stabilization.

In the early 1900s, the average rate of precipitation in the watershed of North Branch Buffalo Creek was 40 to 45 inches (100 to 110 cm) per year.

== Watershed ==
The watershed of North Branch Buffalo Creek has an area of 22.9 square miles (59 km^{2}). Of this, 22.09 square miles (57.2 km^{2}) is in Union County. The mouth of the creek is in the United States Geological Survey quadrangle of Mifflinburg. However, the source is in the quadrangle of Woodward. The creek also passes through the quadrangle of Hartleton. The watershed contains 32.1 miles (51.7 km) of streams. Of these, 3.2 miles (5.1 km) are in agricultural land. In general, the stream flows through countryside, including farms and meadows.

North Branch Buffalo Creek is one of the major tributaries of Buffalo Creek. The watershed of the main stem (discounting named tributaries) makes up 10 percent of the watershed of Buffalo Creek. The headwaters of the creek are in a wetland that is relatively large for the area.

A total of 87 percent of the watershed of the main stem of North Branch Buffalo Creek is on forested land. Another 9 percent of the main stem watershed is on agricultural land. Another 2 percent is on impervious surfaces, though this could rise to 10 percent in the future. The agricultural land in the watershed includes 477 acres (193 ha) of row crops and 502 acres (203 ha) of hay and pastures. A total of 129 acres (52 ha) of agricultural land in the watershed is on slopes of more than 3 percent.

There is a water supply reservoir on North Branch Buffalo Creek. It is owned by the borough of Mifflinburg and is one of two water supply reservoirs in the Buffalo Creek drainage basin. There are 1.1 miles (1.8 km) of unpaved roads in the watershed. The creek's mouth is about 1 mile (1.6 km) northeast of Mifflinburg.

== History ==
North Branch Buffalo Creek was entered into the Geographic Names Information System on August 2, 1979. Its identifier in the Geographic Names Information System is 1182528. The creek is also known as Branch Run and North Branch Run. These variant names both appear in David G. Stephenson's Place Names of Centre County Pennsylvania: A Geographical Analysis, which was published in 1969.

In 1771, Jacob Fought purchased a tract of land at the mouth of North Branch Buffalo Creek from Captain Joseph Green. The tract had an area of 216 acres (87 ha) and Fought built the first gristmill in the area on it. It was also for a period of time used as the polling location for Northumberland County's third election district.

North Branch Buffalo Creek was historically used as the power source of a number of small mills that produced grist, lumber, woolens, and cider. The mills have since ceased operation. Logging was done in a section of the North Branch Buffalo Creek watershed between 1893 and 1896. There were also railroads in the area during this period. However, the area was purchased by the Commonwealth of Pennsylvania in the early 1900s and is now The Hook Natural Area. In the early 1900s, the watershed of North Branch Buffalo Creek had relatively little settlement throughout. The main industry in the watershed was agriculture. However, it was also used as a water supply in Mifflinburg.

A steel stringer/multi-beam or girder bridge carrying T-357 was built over North Branch Buffalo Creek in 1954 and is closed. The bridge is 55.1 feet (16.8 m) long. Another bridge of the same type, but carrying T-359, was built over the creek in 1954 and is 48.9 feet (14.9 m) long. A two-span prestressed box beam or girder bridge carrying State Route 3007 was built over the creek in 1972. It is 91.9 feet (28.0 m) long and is located 1 mile (1.6 km) north of Mifflinburg.

In a 2008 report, the watershed of North Branch Buffalo Creek was ranked sixth amongst sub-watersheds in the Buffalo Creek drainage basin for restoration priority. There is a gauging station for discharge on the stream.

== Biology ==
The drainage basin of North Branch Buffalo Creek upstream of the Mifflinburg Water Supply Dam is designated as Exceptional Value and a Migratory Fishery. From the dam downstream to the creek's mouth, the drainage basin is designated as a High-Quality Coldwater Fishery and a Migratory Fishery. Wild trout naturally reproduce in the creek from its headwaters downstream to its mouth. Two reaches of the creek are classified as a Class B trout stream. A reach of the creek has also been stocked with brown trout and rainbow trout. However, brook trout naturally inhabit it.

North Branch Buffalo Creek has a healthy population of benthic macroinvertebrates. The pathogen load in the stream is 2.320 × 10^{16} organisms per month. Urban areas are by far the largest source, contributing 2.289 × 10^{16} organisms per month. Other sources of pathogens include farm animals (3.085 × 10^{14} organisms per month), wildlife (3.493 × 10^{12} organisms per month), and septic systems (3.419 × 10^{12} organisms per month).

No agricultural stream reaches in the watershed of North Branch Buffalo Creek contain forested riparian buffer strips. Shrub swamps and conifer swamps occur in the wetland at the headwaters of the creek. The shrub swamp type contains speckled alder, sedges, and peat moss. The conifer swamp contains eastern hemlock, rhododendron, peat moss, and various shrubs and herbs. There are no known species of special concern in the wetland, but one was observed nearby in 1990.

The part of the North Branch Buffalo Creek watershed that is in The Hook Natural Area once was dominated by hemlock, white oak, and white pine. However, trees such as white pine, red maple, white oak, red oak, scarlet oak, black oak, and chestnut oak are predominant in the area today, as are white birch, yellow birch, and black birch.

== Recreation ==
A reach of North Branch Buffalo Creek is in Bald Eagle State Forest. Part of it also flows through The Hook Natural Area. Villages in the watershed include Johnstown and Red Bank. The creek can be accessed from both of these. At least one hiking trail closely follows the creek as far downstream as the Mifflinburg Reservoir. Trails in the creek's vicinity include the Frederick Trail and the Braucher Path. Additionally, the Mid State Trail passes by its headwaters.

Although North Branch Buffalo Creek historically had industrial uses, its main applications in modern times are recreational. The Buffalo Mills Hunting Camp, a hunting camp that was used by lumberjacks and sawmill workers, is in the vicinity of the creek.

== See also ==
- Rapid Run (Buffalo Creek), next tributary of Buffalo Creek going downstream
- List of rivers of Pennsylvania
