= Coal City =

Coal City may refer to:

- Coal City, Illinois, USA
- Coal City, Indiana, USA
- Coal City, Iowa, US
- Coal City, Utah, USA
- Coal City, West Virginia, USA
- Nickname for Enugu (city), Nigeria
