= Coal Mountain =

Coal Mountain may refer to:

- Coal Mountain, British Columbia, Canada
  - Coal Mountain Mine
- Coal Mountain, Colorado, a peak in the West Elk mountains, U.S.
- Coal Mountain, Georgia, U.S.
- Coal Mountain, West Virginia, U.S.
- Kolfjellet, Norway

== See also ==
- Cool Mountain
