= Coal Hollow, Pennsylvania =

Unincorporated community in Pennsylvania, US

- Unincorporated community
- Location within the state of Pennsylvania Coal Hollow (the United States)
- Coordinates: 41°20′42″N 78°36′37″W
- Country: United States
- State: Pennsylvania
- County: Elk
- Township: Fox
- Elevation: 1,749 ft (533 m)
- Time zone: UTC-5 (Eastern (EST))
  - Summer (DST): UTC-4 (EDT)
- GNIS feature ID: 1172056

Coal Hollow is an unincorporated community and coal town in Elk County, Pennsylvania, United States. Situated near Coal Hollow Road (PA 2005) and Toby Road (PA 2003), it was also known as Toby Mines. Dagus Mines, another unincorporated community, is nearby.
