= White River Narrows =

Canyon in Nevada, United States

Coordinates: 37.8280°N 115.0369°W

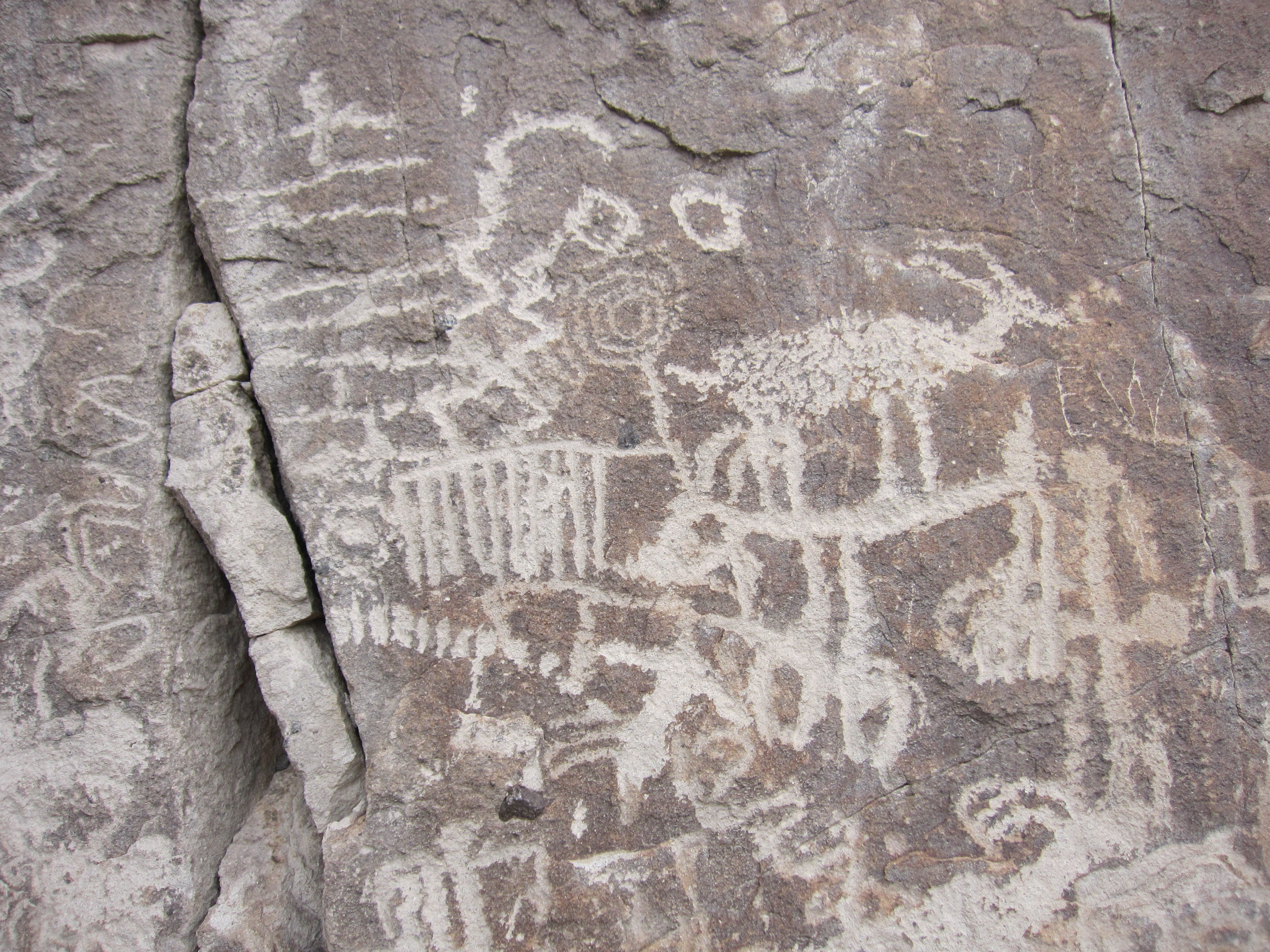

White River Narrows is a winding canyon in the Weepah Spring Wilderness, part of Basin and Range National Monument, Nevada, notable for its rock art.

The canyon was carved by the White River during the Pleistocene. It is home to one of the largest concentrations of prehistoric rock art in eastern Nevada. The rock art sites cover more than 4,000 acres and are listed on the National Register of Historic Places. The rock art consists of two styles, one associated with hunter-gatherers (Basin and Range tradition) and one with Fremont groups.
