= Coleshill =

Coleshill may refer to:

== England ==
- Coleshill, Warwickshire, a town near to Birmingham
- Coleshill, Buckinghamshire, a village and civil parish
- Coleshill, Oxfordshire, a village and civil parish (formerly Berkshire)
  - nearby Coleshill House, destroyed "best Jonesian mid C17 house in England".

== Wales ==
- Coleshill, Flintshire, a historic administrative subdivision of Flintshire

== See also ==
- Cole's Hill, an historical landmark in Plymouth, Massachusetts, US
- Coal Hill (disambiguation)
