= Coal Hollow =

Coal Hollow may refer to:

- Coal Hollow, Illinois, a community in Bureau County
- Coal Hollow, Pennsylvania, a community in Elk County
