= Coal City, Utah =

Coal City
- Ghost town
- Location within Utah Location within the United States
- Coordinates: 39°40′00″N 111°00′59″W
- Country: United States
- State: Utah
- County: Carbon
- Founded: 1885
- Abandoned: 1940
- Named for: Coal
- Elevation: 7,133 ft (2,174 m)
- GNIS feature ID: 1451215

Coal City is a ghost town in Carbon County, Utah, United States. Established in 1885, Coal City was initially a farming community until coal was discovered in the area. Small-scale mining began to take place, and because the mining operations were a mile or two away from the mines at National and Consumers, it was assumed that the citizens of the town would lack workplace stress. Coal production began to decline in 1935, and the town was essentially abandoned with just two residences occupied by the late 1960s.

== History ==
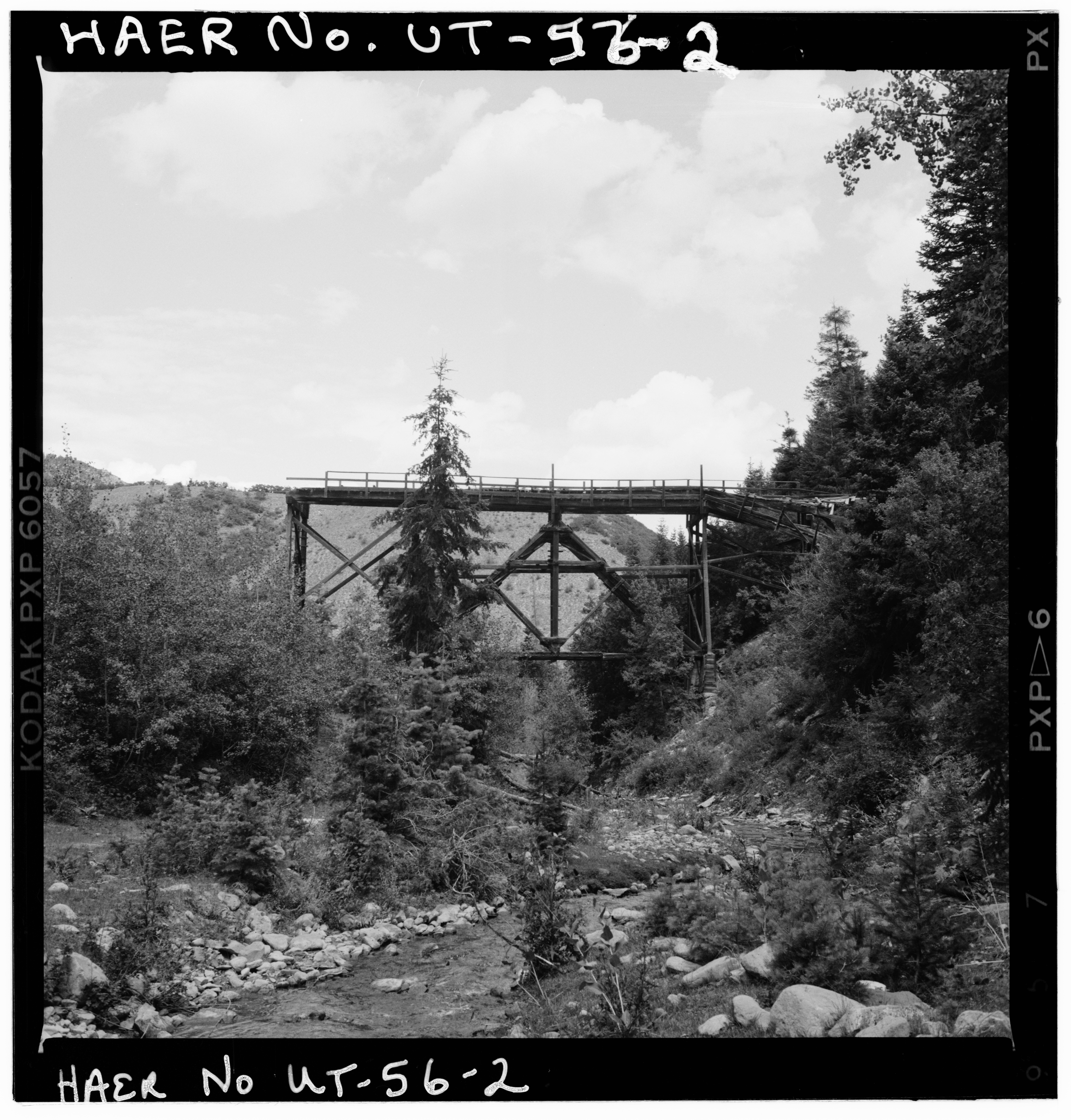
Former mining trestle in Coal City

In 1885, a group of settlers established a town in Carbon County, Utah, and called it Oak Springs Bench. Because the town's elevation was approximately 7,000 feet (2,100 m), farming and ranching were difficult. However, soon after the town was settled, coal was discovered in the area. Small-scale mining took place under the Great Western Coal Mines Company, but mining operations weren't large due to the town's distance from the nearest railroad. In August 1921, the permanent town site was platted and renamed Coal City, after the deposits of coal in the area. The town was incorporated in October 1921. Although most of the houses were tents, a log school house served Coal City in 1925, and was replaced by a brick schoolhouse in 1927. Later that year, a couple stores and a bakery were constructed, and made up the business district. A few dozen homes were constructed around the stores. The town's residents lacked stress from mining operations because they were located away from the larger mining operations in National and Consumers. At its peak, the population was about 70. In 1926, the mine superintendent, George Storrs, was indicted for mail fraud. Though he was cleared of charges, in December 1926, Storrs's mining company went bankrupt and halted operations. The town began to decline in 1935 and by 1940 it was uninhabited. A few buildings remain in Coal City, including two stores, several houses, and a few outbuildings.

== See also ==
- List of ghost towns in Utah
- Coal mining in the United States
