= Coal Valley =

Coal Valley may refer to:

- Coal Valley, Illinois
- Coal Valley, Iowa
- Coal Valley (Nevada), a valley in Nevada
- Coal Valley, West Virginia
- Coal Valley Township, Rock Island County, Illinois
