= Coal Lake =

Coal Lake may refer to:

- Coal Lake (Alberta)
- Coal Lake (Minnesota)
