= Coal River =

Coal River may refer to:

Rivers

- Coal River (Canada), in Yukon and British Columbia
- Coal River (Fiordland), in New Zealand
- Coal River (Canterbury), in New Zealand
- Coal River (West Virginia), in the United States
- Coal River (Tasmania), in Australia

Other

- Coal River (book), a 2008 nonfiction book about mountaintop removal mining in the United States
- Coal River was the early name for the Australian settlement which became Newcastle, New South Wales
