= National, Utah =

Coordinates: 39.6895°N 111.0519°W

National
- Ghost town
- Interactive map of National
- Country: United States
- State: Utah
- County: Carbon
- Founded: c. 1920s
- Abandoned: 1950
- Named for: National Coal Company

National is a ghost town in Carbon County, Utah, United States. It is located along upper Gordon Creek.

== History ==
Coal was discovered in the area in 1908, but large-scale mining did not begin until the National Coal Company purchased the mines in the 1920s. All of the buildings in National were constructed of the same brick material. However only supervisors, foremen and those living in apartments had access to indoor plumbing. In 1921, the National Coal Company, together with the Gordon Creek Coal Company, began building a railroad line from Helper to the mining operations but which was not completed until the fall of 1925. In July 1938, the National Coal Company discontinued mining operations in the area. The mine was sold under foreclosure by the end of the year. All of the mining equipment that had value was sold. Mining continued in 1940 under a new owner and operated through World War Two, but the town was abandoned by 1950. A few foundations and deteriorating buildings remain in National.

National is located less than a mile from the ghost towns of Consumers and Sweets; the three towns shared a post office, school house, hospital and amusement hall. National is also only a few miles away from the ghost town of Coal City.

== See also ==
- List of ghost towns in Utah
- Coal mining in the United States
