= Kolfjellet =

Mountain in Nordenskiöld Land, Spitsbergen, Svalbard

Coordinates: 77.8087°N 14.9424°E

Kolfjellet is a mountain in Nordenskiöld Land at Spitsbergen, Svalbard. The mountain is located north of Van Mijenfjorden and east of Berzeliusdalen, and is separated from Hesselbergaksla and Iskollen by the valley Kolfjelldalen and the glacier Kolfjellbreen. The name Kolfjellet ("Coal mountain") stems from coal deposits in the mountain. The first registered ascent was accomplished in 1912. The mountain is included in the Nordenskiöld Land National Park.
