= Coal Township =

Coal Township may refer to the following townships in the United States:

- Coal Township, Northumberland County, Pennsylvania
- Coal Township, Jackson County, Ohio
- Coal Township, Perry County, Ohio
- Coal Township, Vernon County, Missouri
