= Coal Lake (Minnesota) =

Lake in Minnesota, United States

- Location within Minnesota
- Location: Todd County, Minnesota
- Coordinates: 46°4′53″N 94°45′19″W
- Type: Lake
- Surface elevation: 1,299 feet (396 m)

Coal Lake is a lake in Todd County, in the U.S. state of Minnesota.

Coal Lake was named after nearby deposits of lignite coal.

== See also ==
- List of lakes in Minnesota
