= Coal Island (South Georgia) =

Coal Island (54°2′S 37°57′W) is a small tussock-covered island with off-lying rocks marking the west side of the entrance to Coal Harbor, near the west end of South Georgia. It was charted by Discovery Investigations personnel on the Discovery during the period 1926–30, and by HMS Owen in 1960–61. It was named by the UK Antarctic Place-Names Committee in 1963 in association with Coal Harbor.

== See also ==
- List of Antarctic and sub-Antarctic islands
