= Coalmont =

Coalmont may refer to one of the following places:

United States

- Coalmont, Colorado
- Coalmont, Indiana
- Coalmont, Pennsylvania
- Coalmont, Tennessee

Canada

- Coalmont, British Columbia
