= Basin and Range National Monument =

National monument in southeastern Nevada, United States

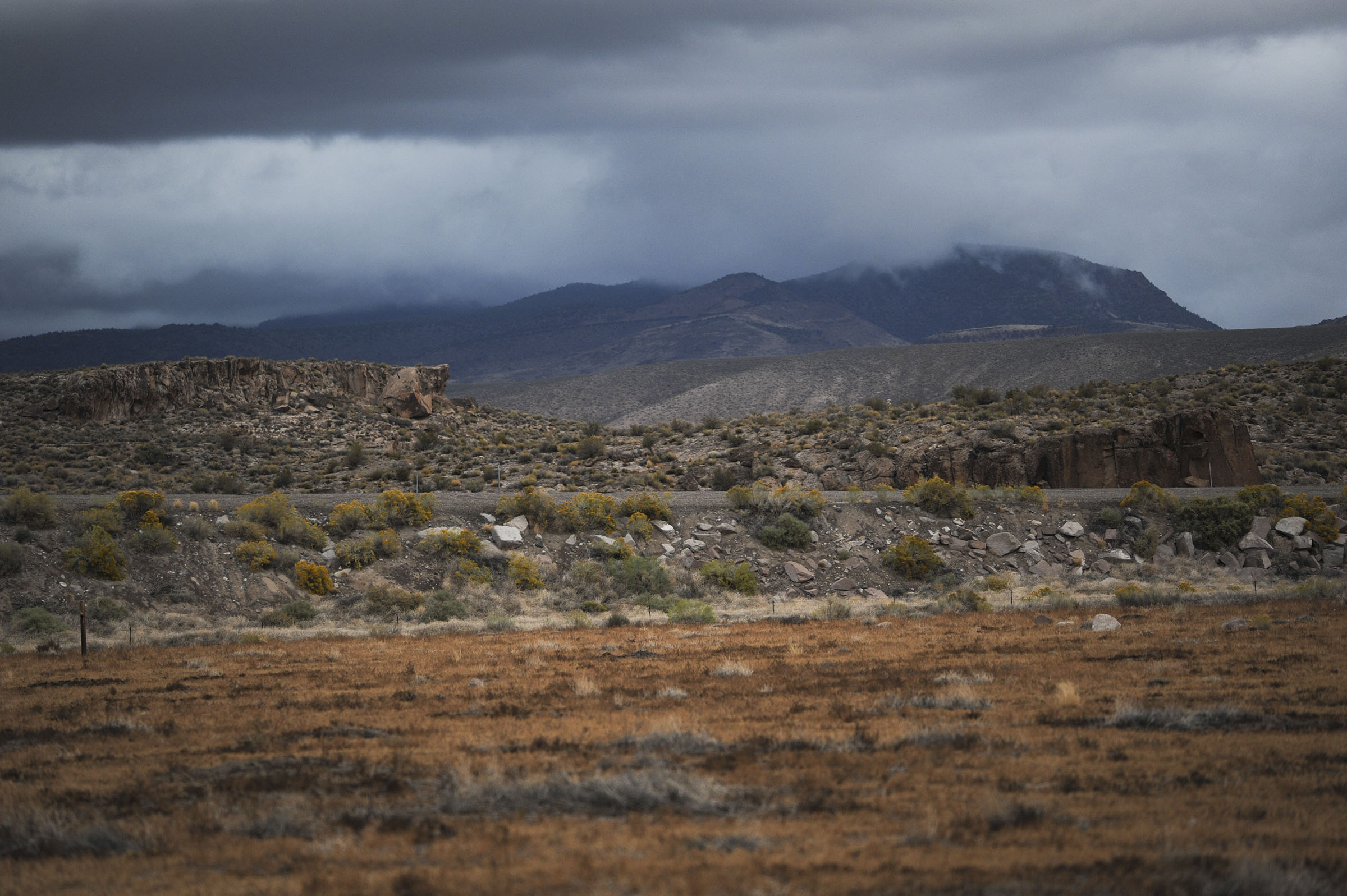

- Location within Nevada Location within the United States
- Location: Lincoln and Nye counties, Nevada, United States
- Nearest city: Las Vegas, Nevada
- Coordinates: 37°55′41″N 115°23′50″W
- Area: 704,000 acres (285,000 ha)
- Established: July 10, 2015
- Governing body: U.S. Bureau of Land Management
- Website: Basin and Range National Monument

U.S. National Monument
- Designated: July 10, 2015

Basin and Range National Monument is a national monument of the United States spanning approximately 704,000 acres (1,100 sq mi; 2,800 km^{2}) of remote, undeveloped mountains and valleys in Lincoln and Nye counties in southeastern Nevada. It is described as "one of the emptiest spaces in a state famous for its emptiness."

== Creation ==
The national monument was created by a proclamation issued on July 10, 2015, by President Barack Obama under the Antiquities Act. Obama also signed proclamations creating two other national monuments (the Berryessa Snow Mountain National Monument in northern California and the Waco Mammoth National Monument in central Texas) the same day. Basin and Range was also the second national monument to be created in Nevada in less than eight months; the Tule Springs Fossil Beds National Monument had been designated in 2014.

Senator Harry Reid and Representative Dina Titus, both Democrats of Nevada, were major proponents of protecting the Basin and Range area; before the area's designation by executive action, they had sponsored a bill to protect the Basin and Range area (withdrawing it from mining and other uses) by legislation. The campaign to designate Basin and Range as a national monument had the support of Nevada's largest employer, MGM Resorts International, as well as Wynn Resorts, Barrick Gold Corporation, Rockwood Lithium North America, the Las Vegas Metro Chamber of Commerce, and the Las Vegas Convention and Visitors Authority. Some members of the local population opposed the designation and complained of limited public involvement.

The creation of the national monument was applauded by Reid, Titus, and Secretary of the Interior Sally Jewell. The Sierra Club also praised the designation, stating that the area was "a fitting addition to our protected public lands" because it is "one of the best examples of the spectacular basins framed by Nevada's breathtaking mountain ranges, a resting place for historic artifacts critical to understanding our nation's Native American cultural history, and home to unique plants and animals, some found only in Nevada and this region." Conversely, three Republican U.S. Representatives from Nevada, Mark Amodei, Joe Heck, and Cresent Hardy, condemned the new monument, and Republican U.S. Representative Rob Bishop, the chairman of the House Committee on Natural Resources, called it a "surreptitious land grab" by the Obama administration.

The creation of the national monument was a setback for long-controversial plans to open a nuclear waste repository at Yucca Mountain, Nevada. Previously, a U.S. Department of Energy study had looked at possible railroad routes to carry radioactive waste to Yucca Mountain and had proposed a Caliente-to-Yucca Mountain route, of which 300 miles (480 km) would run through an area later designated at Basin and Range National Monument. Robert Halstead, the executive director of the Nevada Agency for Nuclear Projects, said the proclamation of the Basin and Range National Monument was the "final nail in the coffin" of the railroad project and would "really complicate life" for the Nuclear Regulatory Commission.

== Description and significance ==
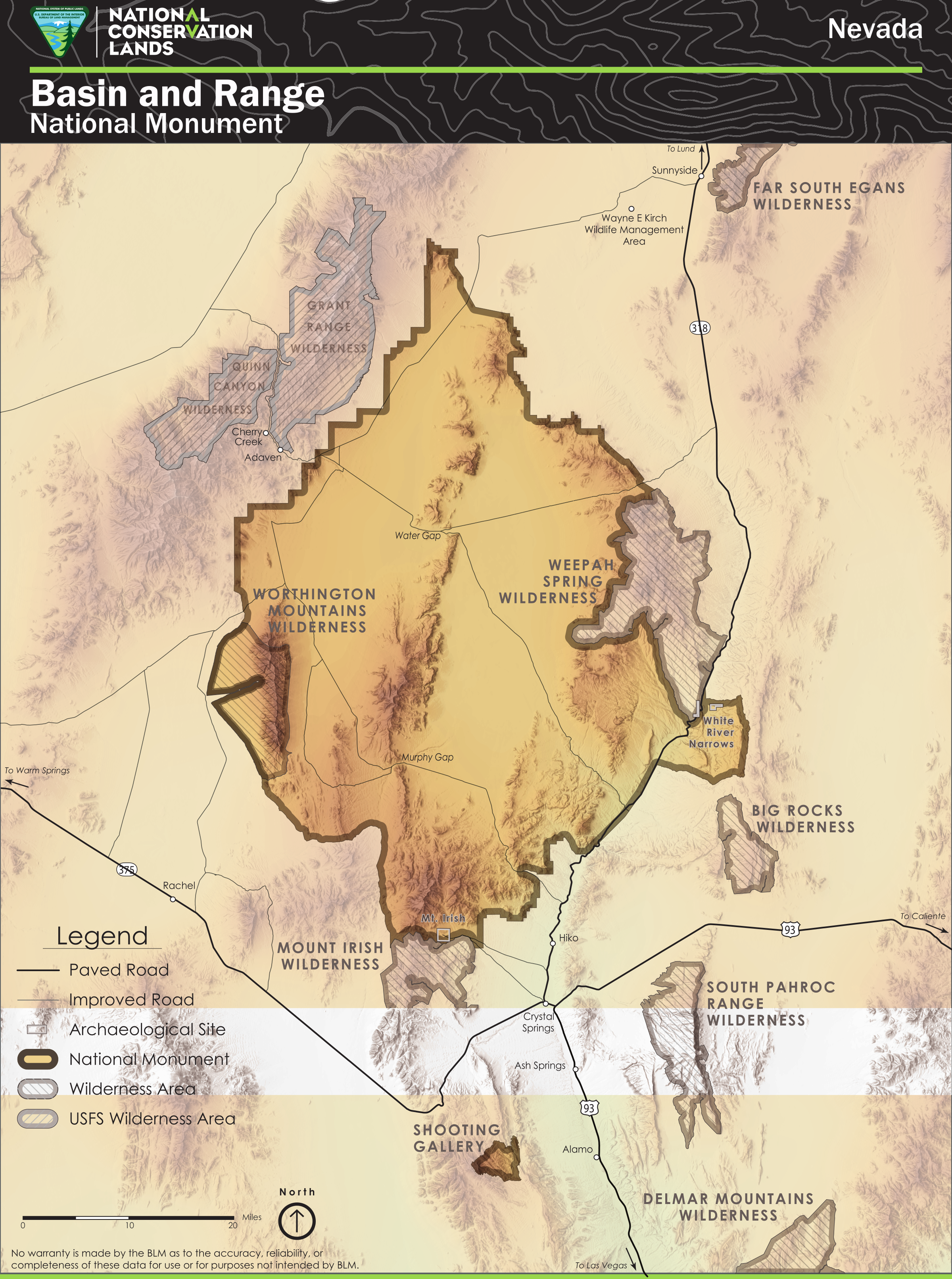
Basin and Range National Monument, Nevada

The Basin and Range National Monument area has geological, ecological, cultural, historical, paleoecological, seismological, archaeological, and paleoclimatological significance. The area is located in a transitional region between the Mojave Desert and the Sagebrush Steppe of the Great Basin.

Major features within the national monument include: Garden Valley and Coal Valley; the Worthington Mountains, containing the Worthington Mountains Wilderness Area; the Golden Gate Range; the Seaman Range; the Mount Irish Range; the Hiko Narrows; the White River Narrows; and the Shooting Gallery rock art site. Native American rock art at the site is about 4,000 years old.

The national monument consists largely of existing federal lands, managed by Bureau of Land Management of the United States Department of the Interior both before and after the national monument's creation. Within the monument boundary there are privately owned lands including Michael Heizer's City, a massive earth art piece similar in size to the National Mall in Washington. At the time of the monument's creation, the Los Angeles County Museum of Art held a conservation easement over the area of the still-incomplete artwork; the museum plans to donate this easement to the United States when the work is completed.

The proclamation allows for continued historic uses of the area (e.g., hunting and fishing) under preexisting regulations. The proclamation also does not affect grazing operations within the monument (including "use of motorized vehicles, construction and maintenance of water infrastructure, and construction of fences and other range improvements"). The proclamation also does not affect U.S. military uses of monument; the military will continue to use the monument's land and airspace for emergency response and training.

Fauna of significance in the national monument include desert bighorn sheep, golden eagle, and many species of bat, lizard, and snake.

== See also ==
- Basin and Range Province
- Basin and range topography
- List of national monuments of the United States
