= Coal Ridge Baptist Church and Cemetery =

Historic site in Marion County, Iowa

- U.S. National Register of Historic Places
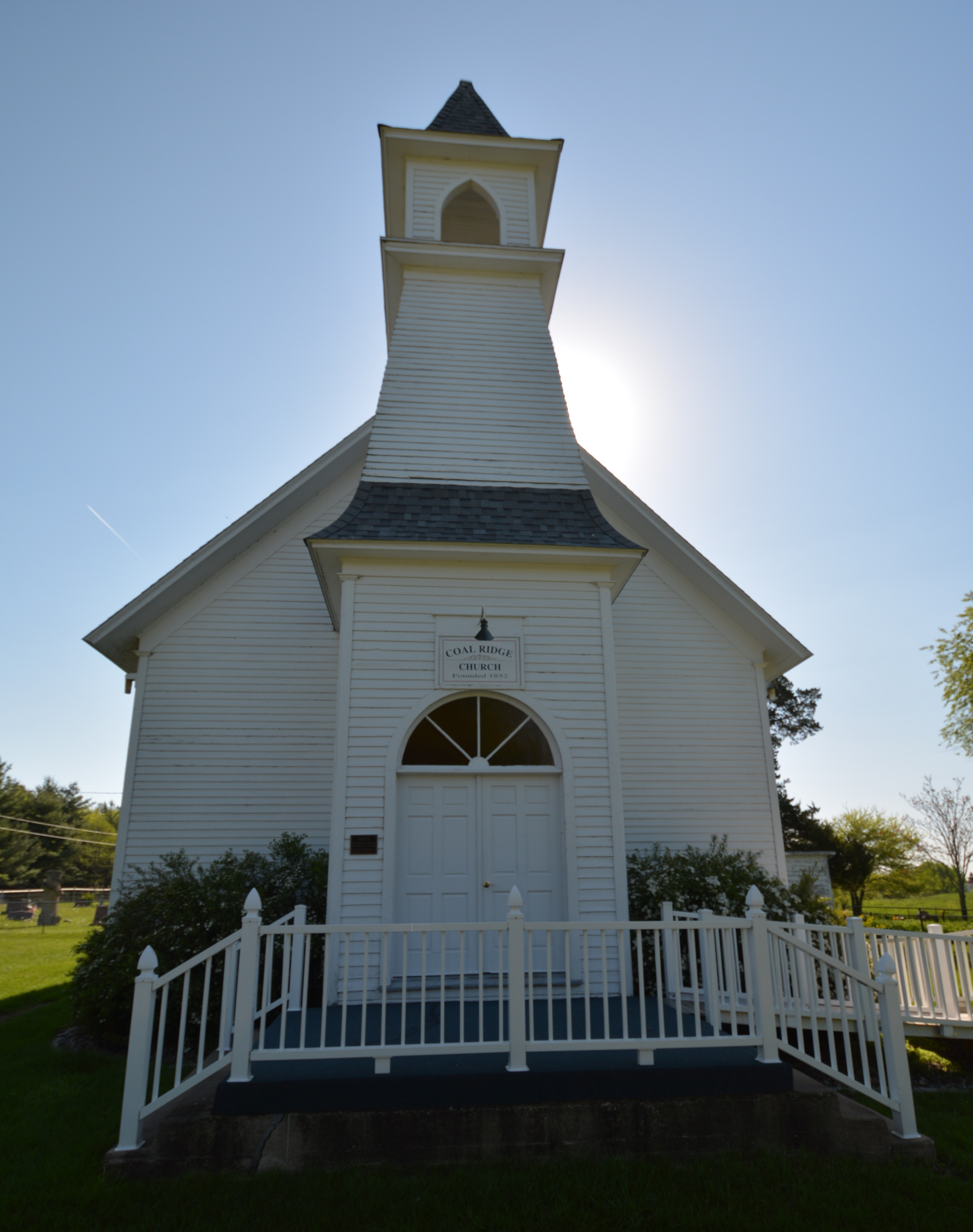

- Location within Iowa Location within the United States
- Location: 1034 IA S71, Knoxville, Iowa
- Coordinates: 41°22′41″N 93°1′15″W
- Area: less than one acre
- Built: 1909
- Built by: Oliver Reynolds
- Architectural style: Late 19th And 20th Century Revivals
- NRHP reference No.: 06000711
- Added to NRHP: August 23, 2006

Coal Ridge Baptist Church and Cemetery (also known as Coal Ridge Church; Coal Ridge Community Church; Coal Ridge Church Museum) is a historic church at 1034 IA S71 in Knoxville, Iowa that was built in 1909. It replaced an 1860-built church that was destroyed in a fire on October 11, 1908, and it served the community of Coalport, which is long gone. Coalport, built in the floodplain of the Des Moines River, disappeared under man-made Lake Red Rock when the river was dammed in 1969. The church and cemetery are on a hill above the lake.

It was added to the National Register of Historic Places (NRHP) in 2006. Its three contributing resources are the church, the cemetery, and a historic tool shed. The property was deemed significant for its social history and its architecture. Regarding its social history, its NRHP nomination describes:

The church became a gathering place in the early 20th century for the unincorporated "Down on the Ridge" community of Coalport and Coal Ridge. The church is the last remaining building of this historic community. Over the years, church activities shifted to accommodate the changing social and religious life of local residents. As Coalport and Coal Ridge declined in population, the surrounding rural population became the church's chief focus. Then, in the late 20th century, this rural area experienced a renaissance, and the church adapted to these needs. Throughout this time, the Coal Ridge Baptist Ladies Aid, an organization founded by the church in 1913 and still active, nurtured the social ties among local residents and promoted community betterment.

And regarding its architecture:

The exterior of the building blends the influences of Neo-Classical and late Gothic Revival styling together in a design of striking simplicity, while the interior of the building shows a careful regard for practicality.
