= Consumers, Utah =

Coordinates: 39°42′02″N 111°03′46″W

Consumers
- Ghost town
- Interactive map of Consumers
- Country: United States
- State: Utah
- County: Carbon
- Founded: c. 1921
- Abandoned: 1950
- Named for: Consumers Coal Company
- Elevation: 8,101 ft (2,469 m)
- GNIS feature ID: 1451217

Consumers is a ghost town in Carbon County, Utah, United States. It is located in the Gordon Valley near several other former coal mining communities that also are now ghost towns. It is less than a mile from the ghost town of National, and also quite near to Clear Creek.

== History ==
Coal was discovered in the area in 1908, but large-scale mining did not begin until the 1920s. The settlement was originally named Gibson, after Arthur E. Gibson who secured almost 1,500 acres of land sometime before 1920. During the winter of 1921–22, Gibson began to develop a seam of coal, hiring labor to work the mine. By 1924, the Consumers Mutual Coal Company was formed; the town that was originally called Gibson changed its name to Consumers. The Consumers Mine was the first in Utah to use conveyor belts to haul the coal, rather than mine cars. In September, 1927, the company rebranded to the Blue Blaze Coal Company.

The town shared a post office, school house, hospital and amusement hall with the nearby towns of National and Sweet. Consumers had its own store and a central well shared by all community members via standpipes. None of the general workforce had indoor plumbing inside their homes.

The mine closed in February 1938, although it reopened in October 1939 under new ownership. Sometime in the 1940s, the Hudson Coal Company took ownership of all the coal mining operations in the Gordon Valley area. Modern mining operations continue in the area today, but Consumers itself was abandoned by the end of the 1940s. All that remains today are a few decaying buildings and foundations.

== See also ==
- List of ghost towns in Utah
- Coal mining in the United States
