= Dagus Mines, Pennsylvania =

Unincorporated community in Pennsylvania, US

- Unincorporated community
- Location within the state of Pennsylvania Dagus Mines (the United States)
- Coordinates: 41°21′14″N 78°36′20″W
- Country: United States
- State: Pennsylvania
- County: Elk
- Township: Fox
- Elevation: 1,906 ft (581 m)
- Time zone: UTC-5 (Eastern (EST))
  - Summer (DST): UTC-4 (EDT)
- ZIP codes: 15831
- GNIS feature ID: 1213086

Dagus Mines is an unincorporated community and coal town located in Elk County, Pennsylvania, United States. Their post office opened in 1880. Dagus Mines was built by the Northwestern and Mine Exchange Company for its many workers. The company would open multiple mines in the area with the first one being Eureka. The most famous mine was a 36" thick section of the Lower Kittanning seam, sometimes locally known as the Dagus seam. J.H. Steele would open the "Company Store," carrying mining supplies, clothing, footwear, groceries and feed for farm animals. It later became G.H. Gatto's store. The building then served as an apartment building until December 2016 when it was destroyed by fire and razed. Dagus Mines also featured a hotel and union hall. "Where the Fox Township Medical Center is located today, the Dagus Mines Union Hall once stood. Besides union meetings, medicine shows often appeared there. Across the street from the union hall was the Hau Hotel."
