= Coal Run (North Branch Buffalo Creek tributary) =

Stream in Pennsylvania, United States

Physical characteristics
- Source
  - location: near a valley in Lewis Township, Union County, Pennsylvania
  - elevation: between 740 and 760 feet (226 and 232 m)
- Mouth
  - location: North Branch Buffalo Creek in West Buffalo Township, Union County, Pennsylvania
  - coordinates: 40°56′04″N 77°02′36″W
  - elevation: 538 ft (164 m)
- Length: 3.6 mi (5.8 km)
- Basin size: 5.33 mi^{2} (13.8 km^{2})

Basin features
- Progression: North Branch Buffalo Creek → Buffalo Creek → West Branch Susquehanna River → Susquehanna River → Chesapeake Bay
- Tributaries
  - left: five unnamed tributaries

Coal Run is a tributary of North Branch Buffalo Creek in Union County, Pennsylvania, in the United States. It is approximately 3.6 miles (5.8 km) long and flows through Lewis Township and West Buffalo Township. The watershed of the stream has an area of 5.33 square miles (13.8 km^{2}). A few streams in its watershed are designated as impaired due to nutrients and siltation. The watershed mostly consists of agricultural and forested land. Wild trout occur within the stream.

== Course ==
Coal Run begins near a valley in Lewis Township. It flows southeast for several tenths of a mile before entering West Buffalo Township. Immediately upon entering that township, the stream turns east-southeast for several tenths of a mile, receiving one unnamed tributary from the left. It then flows east for a few miles, receiving three more unnamed tributaries from the left. After a while, it turns east-southeast for a few tenths of a mile before turning east again and receiving another unnamed tributary from the left. The stream then flows east-northeast for several tenths of a mile until it reaches its confluence with North Branch Buffalo Creek.

Coal Run joins North Branch Buffalo Creek 0.46 miles (0.74 km) upstream of its mouth.

=== Tributaries ===
Coal Run has no named tributaries. However, it has a number of unnamed tributaries. The stream codes of these unnamed tributaries include 19039, 19041, and 19042.

== Hydrology ==
Various tributaries to Coal Run are designated as impaired waterbodies. The cause of the impairment is nutrients and siltation, while the source is grazing-related agriculture. The total maximum daily load date is 2015. Streams in its watershed are also impacted by E. coli and thermal radiation. The stream and a number of others in Union County have been described as "not as clean as they should be".

In 2000, the load of sediment in Coal Run was 608,838 pounds (276,164 kg) and in 2008, it was 571,464 pounds (259,212 kg). This equates to between 150 and 200 pounds per acre (170 and 220 kg/ha) per year. However, in the future, it could be reduced by 61.76 percent to 218,504 pounds (99,112 kg) per year. In 2000, row crops and streambank erosion were the largest contributors of sediment, contributing 289,101 and 230,144 pounds (131,134 and 104,392 kg), respectively. A total of 56,742 pounds (25,738 kg) came from hay and pastures, 9,808 pounds (4,449 kg) came from unpaved roads, 5,639 pounds (2,558 kg) came from low-density urban land, and 17,404 pounds (7,894 kg) came from other sources.

The nitrogen load of Coal Run in 2000 was 58,691 pounds (26,622 kg), while in 2008, it was 58,248 pounds (26,421 kg). This corresponds to between 15 and 20 pounds per acre (17 and 22 kg/ha). In the future, the annual nitrogen load could be reduced by as much as 20.57 percent to 46,264 pounds (20,985 kg).

In 2000, the phosphorus load of Coal Run was 2,033 pounds (922 kg), while in 2008, it was 1,999 pounds (907 kg). This equates to slightly less than 0.6 pounds per acre (0.67 kg/ha) per year. However, in the future, the phosphorus load could be reduced by 43.82 percent to 1,123 pounds (509 kg) per year.

== Geography and geology ==
The elevation near the mouth of Coal Run is 538 feet (164 m) above sea level. The elevation of the stream's source is between 740 and 760 feet (226 and 232 m) above sea level.

There is no fencing or streambank stabilization in the watershed of Coal Run.

== Watershed ==
The watershed of Coal Run has an area of 5.33 square miles (13.8 km^{2}). The stream is entirely within the United States Geological Survey quadrangle of Mifflinburg. The watershed of the stream makes up 3 percent of the Buffalo Creek drainage basin. There are 13.4 miles (21.6 km) of streams in the watershed, including 6.1 miles (9.8 km) in agricultural land.

Agricultural land makes up 50 percent of the watershed of Coal Run and forested land makes up 40 percent. Impervious surface make up 3 percent of the watershed, though this could rise to 24 percent in the future. There are 21 acres (8.5 ha) of no-till conversions in the watershed.

The agricultural land in the watershed of Coal Run includes 974 acres (394 ha) of row crops and 969 acres (392 ha) of hay and pastures. A total of 346 acres (140 ha) of agricultural land are on slopes of more than 3 percent.

== History ==
Coal Run was entered into the Geographic Names Information System on August 2, 1979. Its identifier in the Geographic Names Information System is 1172067.

A steel arch bridge carrying T-394 over Coal Run was built in 1984. It is 21.0 feet (6.4 m) long and is located 1 mile (1.6 km) north of Mifflinburg.

== Biology ==
Wild trout naturally reproduce in Coal Run from its headwaters downstream to its mouth.

Vegetated buffer strips occur along 3.3 miles (5.3 km) of streams in the watershed of Coal Run.

The pathogen load of Coal Run is 7.058 × 10^{15} organisms per month, though this could be reduced to 6.686 × 10^{15} organisms per month in the future. The largest contributors of pathogens are urban areas and farm animals (6.526 × 10^{15} and 5.503 × 10^{14} organisms per month, respectively). Septic systems and wildlife contribute 1.054 × 10^{12} and 4.451 × 10^{11} organisms per month, respectively.

== See also ==
- Panther Run, next tributary of North Branch Buffalo Creek going upstream
- List of rivers of Pennsylvania
