= Coal Hill =

Coal Hill may refer to:

- Coal Hill, Arkansas
- Coal Hill, Ohio
- A hill located in Jingshan Park to the north of the Forbidden City in Beijing
- Coal Hill in McCone County, Montana
- Coal Hill Coal Railroad, a railroad in Mt Washington, Pittsburgh, Pennsylvania
- Coal Hill School, a fictional London school in the Doctor Who universe

== See also ==
- Coleshill (disambiguation)
