= Coal Run (Archers Fork tributary) =

Stream in Ohio, United States

Coordinates: 39°28′44″N 81°13′16″W

Coal Run is a stream in the U.S. state of Ohio. It is a tributary to Archers Fork.

Coal Run is noted for deposits of coal near its course.
