= Coal River (Fiordland) =

- Route of the Coal River
- Mouth of the Coal River Coal River (Fiordland) (South Island) Coal River (Fiordland) (New Zealand)
- Native name: Waimaku

Location
- Country: New Zealand

Physical characteristics
- Source
  - location: Lake Swan
  - coordinates: 45°28′48″S 166°48′19″E
  - elevation: 645 m (2,116 ft)
- Mouth
  - location: Coal Bay
  - coordinates: 45°30′10″S 166°43′40″E
  - elevation: 0 m (0 ft)
- Length: 13 km (8 mi)

Basin features
- Progression: Coal River → Coal Bay → Tasman Sea
- Waterbodies: Lake Beattie

The Coal River is a river of Fiordland, New Zealand. It rises south of Stephens Peak and flows south-westward into the Tasman Sea, draining Lakes Beattie, Swan and Paradise.

== See also ==
- List of rivers of New Zealand
