= Coalridge, West Virginia =

Unincorporated community in West Virginia, United States

- Unincorporated community
- Location within West Virginia Location within the United States
- Coordinates: 38°22′21″N 81°23′35″W
- Country: United States
- State: West Virginia
- County: Kanawha
- Elevation: 689 ft (210 m)
- Time zone: UTC-5 (Eastern (EST))
  - Summer (DST): UTC-4 (EDT)
- FIPS code: 1549634

Coalridge is an unincorporated community in Kanawha County, West Virginia, United States.
