= Coal Valley (Nevada) =

Valley in Nevada, United States

Coordinates: 37°56′12″N 115°14′39″W

Coal Valley is a valley in the U.S. state of Nevada.

Coal Valley was so named on account of coal resources in the area.
