= The Hook Natural Area =

Natural area in Pennsylvania

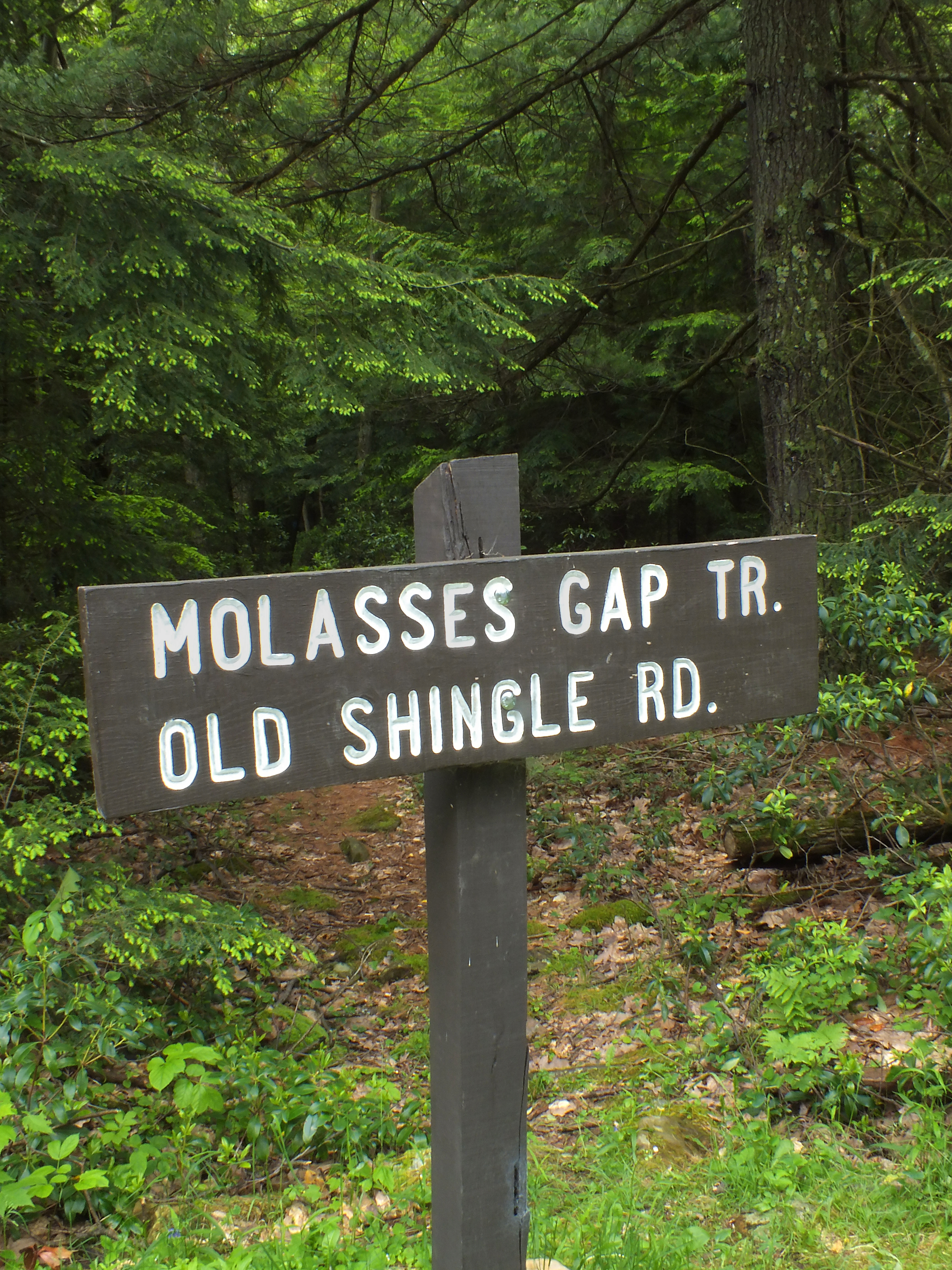
- A sign for hikers in The Hook Natural Area.

- Location within Pennsylvania
- Location: Union County, Pennsylvania
- Nearest town: Hartleton
- Coordinates: 40°57′48″N 77°10′28″W
- Area: 5,119 acres (2,072 ha)

The Hook Natural Area is a 5,119-acre (2,072 ha) protected area in Union County, Pennsylvania, United States. It is part of Bald Eagle State Forest. It was once the largest protected Natural Area in Pennsylvania but has since been surpassed by Pine Creek Gorge Natural Area.

== Description ==
The Natural Area was established to protect the complete watershed of the North Branch of Buffalo Run, which has been named a Class A wild trout fishery. The area is also known for housing songbirds and robust populations of black bears, coyotes, and most notably bobcats which are rare in Pennsylvania. Equally uncommon flying squirrels have also been reported. The Natural Area is named "The Hook" after a distinct meander in the creek, and the area can be explored via a wide variety of maintained hiking trails.
