= List of mountain peaks of Nevada =

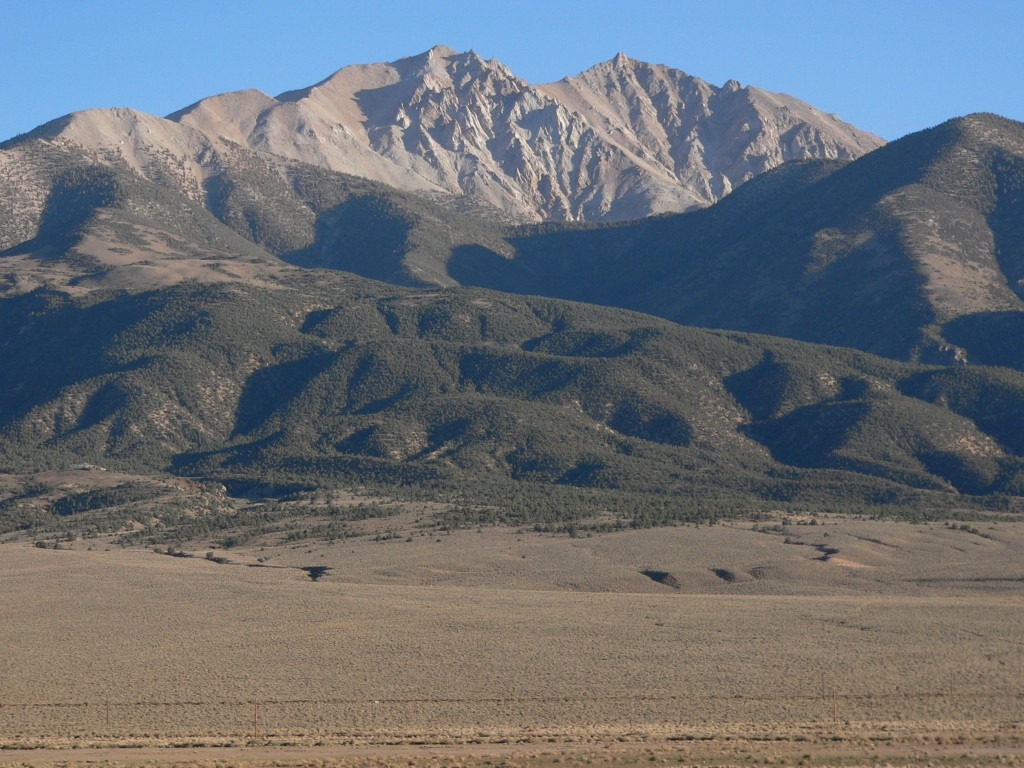
Boundary Peak is the highest summit in the U.S. State of Nevada.

This article comprises three sortable tables of major mountain peaks (Note: This article defines a significant summit as a summit with at least 100 meters (328.1 feet) of topographic prominence, and a major summit as a summit with at least 500 meters (1640 feet) of topographic prominence. All summits in this article have at least 500 meters of topographic prominence. An ultra-prominent summit is a summit with at least 1500 meters (4921 feet) of topographic prominence.) of the U.S. State of Nevada.

The summit of a mountain or hill may be measured in three principal ways:

1. The topographic elevation of a summit measures the height of the summit above a geodetic sea level. (Note: All elevations in this article include an elevation adjustment from the National Geodetic Vertical Datum of 1929 (NGVD 29) to the North American Vertical Datum of 1988 (NAVD 88). For further information, please see this United States National Geodetic Survey note.) (Note: If the elevation or prominence of a summit is calculated as a range of values, the arithmetic mean is shown.) The first table below ranks the 50 highest major summits of Nevada by elevation.
2. The topographic prominence of a summit is a measure of how high the summit rises above its surroundings. (Note: The topographic prominence of a summit is the topographic elevation difference between the summit and its highest or key col to a higher summit. The summit may be near its key col or quite far away. The key col for Denali in Alaska is the Isthmus of Rivas in Nicaragua, 7642 kilometers (4749 miles) away.) The second table below ranks the 52 most prominent summits of Nevada.
3. The topographic isolation (or radius of dominance) of a summit measures how far the summit lies from its nearest point of equal elevation. (Note: The topographic isolation of a summit is the great-circle distance to its nearest point of equal elevation.) The third table below ranks the 50 most isolated major summits of Nevada.

== Highest major summits ==
Of the highest major summits of Nevada, eight peaks exceed 3500 meters (11,483 feet) elevation and 38 peaks exceed 3000 meters (9843 feet) elevation.

The 50 highest summits of Nevada with at least 500 meters of topographic prominence
Rank	Mountain peak	Mountain range	Elevation	Prominence	Isolation	Location
1	Boundary Peak (Note: The summit of Boundary Peak is the highest point of the Snake Range.)	White Mountains	13,146 ft 4007 m	253 ft 77 m	0.53 mi 0.86 km	37.8461111°N 118.3513889°W
2	Wheeler Peak (Note: The summit of Wheeler Peak is the highest point of the Snake Range.)	Snake Range	13,065 ft 3982.3 m	7,568 ft 2307 m	232 mi 373 km	38.9858°N 114.3139°W
3	Mount Moriah	Snake Range	12,072 ft 3679.6 m	4,909 ft 1496 m	20.3 mi 32.7 km	39.2732°N 114.1988°W
4	Mount Jefferson (Note: The summit of Mount Jefferson is the highest point of the Toquima Range.) (Note: The elevation of Mount Jefferson includes an adjustment of +1.666 m (5.47 ft) from NGVD 29 to NAVD 88.)	Toquima Range	11,946 ft 3641 m	5,871 ft 1789 m	98.6 mi 158.7 km	38.7519°N 116.9267°W
5	Charleston Peak (Note: The summit of Charleston Peak is the highest point of the Spring Mountains.) (Mount Charleston)	Spring Mountains	11,916 ft 3632 m	8,258 ft 2517 m	135.1 mi 218 km	36.2716°N 115.6956°W
6	North Schell Peak (Note: The summit of North Schell Peak is the highest point of the Schell Creek Range.)	Schell Creek Range	11,895 ft 3625.6 m	5,413 ft 1650 m	23.5 mi 37.9 km	39.4132°N 114.5997°W
7	Arc Dome (Note: The summit of Arc Dome is the highest point of the Toiyabe Range.) (Note: The elevation of Arc Dome includes an adjustment of +1.665 m (5.46 ft) from NGVD 29 to NAVD 88.)	Toiyabe Range	11,778 ft 3590 m	5,233 ft 1595 m	23.1 mi 37.2 km	38.8327°N 117.3531°W
8	Currant Mountain (Note: The summit of Currant Mountain is the highest point of the White Pine Range.)	White Pine Range	11,518 ft 3510.7 m	4,575 ft 1394 m	52.8 mi 85 km	38.9097°N 115.4246°W
9	Bunker Hill	Toiyabe Range	11,477 ft 3498.3 m	2,813 ft 857 m	31.3 mi 50.3 km	39.2529°N 117.1261°W
10	Ruby Dome (Note: The summit of Ruby Dome is the highest point of the Ruby Mountains.) (Note: The elevation of Ruby Dome includes an adjustment of +1.429 m (4.69 ft) from NGVD 29 to NAVD 88.)	Ruby Mountains	11,392 ft 3472 m	4,810 ft 1466 m	94.7 mi 152.5 km	40.6217°N 115.4754°W
11	Toiyabe Dome (Note: The elevation of Toiyabe Dome includes an adjustment of +1.579 m (5.18 ft) from NGVD 29 to NAVD 88.)	Toiyabe Range	11,366 ft 3464 m	2,101 ft 640 m	5.95 mi 9.58 km	38.7989°N 117.2516°W
12	Hole in the Mountain Peak (Note: The summit of Hole in the Mountain Peak is the highest point of the eastern Humboldt Range.) (Note: The elevation of Hole in the Mountain Peak includes an adjustment of +1.457 m (4.78 ft) from NGVD 29 to NAVD 88.)	East Humboldt Range	11,311 ft 3448 m	4,849 ft 1478 m	26.6 mi 42.8 km	40.9508°N 115.1224°W
13	Mount Grant (Note: The summit of Mount Grant is the highest point of the Wassuk Range.) (Note: The elevation of Mount Grant includes an adjustment of +1.456 m (4.78 ft) from NGVD 29 to NAVD 88.)	Wassuk Range	11,305 ft 3446 m	3,960 ft 1207 m	28.1 mi 45.2 km	38.5685°N 118.7911°W
14	Troy Peak (Note: The summit of Troy Peak is the highest point of the Grant Range.)	Grant Range	11,302 ft 3445 m	4,790 ft 1460 m	40 mi 64.3 km	38.3194°N 115.5019°W
15	Aiken Peak (Note: The elevation of Aiken Peak includes an adjustment of +1.483 m (4.87 ft) from NGVD 29 to NAVD 88.)	Toiyabe Range	11,090 ft 3380 m	2,025 ft 617 m	7.34 mi 11.82 km	39.1531°N 117.1740°W
16	Mount Grafton	Schell Creek Range	10,997 ft 3351.8 m	3,257 ft 993 m	26.8 mi 43.2 km	38.6922°N 114.7424°W
17	Ward Mountain (Note: The summit of Ward Mountain is the highest point of the Egan Range.)	Egan Range	10,941 ft 3334.8 m	3,676 ft 1120 m	18.41 mi 29.6 km	39.1002°N 114.9206°W
18	Shoshone Mountain (Note: The elevation of Shoshone Mountain includes an adjustment of +1.521 m (4.99 ft) from NGVD 29 to NAVD 88.)	Toquima Range	10,912 ft 3326 m	2,167 ft 661 m	6 mi 9.65 km	38.6699°N 116.9634°W
19	Table Mountain (Note: The summit of Table Mountain is the highest point of the Monitor Range.)	Monitor Range	10,894 ft 3320.5 m	3,668 ft 1118 m	17.4 mi 28 km	38.8118°N 116.5883°W
20	Pearl Peak	Ruby Mountains	10,852 ft 3307.6 m	3,628 ft 1106 m	13.37 mi 21.5 km	40.2352°N 115.5407°W
21	Matterhorn (Note: The summit of Matterhorn is the highest point of the Jarbidge Mountains.) (Note: The elevation of Matterhorn includes an adjustment of +1.429 m (4.69 ft) from NGVD 29 to NAVD 88.)	Jarbidge Mountains	10,843 ft 3305 m	4,688 ft 1429 m	60.4 mi 97.2 km	41.8107°N 115.3745°W
22	Mount Rose	Carson Range	10,785 ft 3287.2 m	3,630 ft 1106 m	33.2 mi 53.5 km	39.3438°N 119.9179°W
23	Pilot Peak (Note: The summit of Pilot Peak is the highest point of the Pilot Range.)	Pilot Range	10,720 ft 3267.6 m	5,731 ft 1747 m	53.7 mi 86.4 km	41.0211°N 114.0774°W
24	Diamond Peak (Note: The summit of Diamond Peak is the highest point of the Diamond Mountains.)	Diamond Mountains	10,631 ft 3240.3 m	3,604 ft 1099 m	27.9 mi 44.9 km	39.5849°N 115.8187°W
25	Cherry Creek Benchmark (Note: The summit of Cherry Creek Benchmark is the highest point of the Cherry Creek Range.)	Cherry Creek Range	10,527 ft 3208.5 m	3,734 ft 1138 m	34.3 mi 55.3 km	39.9662°N 114.8958°W
26	Summit Mountain	Monitor Range	10,468 ft 3190.7 m	2,721 ft 829 m	29.2 mi 47 km	39.3767°N 116.4620°W
27	McAfee Peak (Note: The summit of McAfee Peak is the highest point of the Independence Mountains.) (Note: The summit elevation of McAfee Peak includes a vertical offset of +0.03 m (0.1 ft) from the station benchmark.)	Independence Mountains	10,442 ft 3182.8 m	4,168 ft 1270 m	35.6 mi 57.3 km	41.5217°N 115.9734°W
28	Sherman Mountain	Ruby Mountains	10,324 ft 3146.9 m	1,740 ft 530 m	5.85 mi 9.41 km	40.1191°N 115.5865°W
29	North Shoshone Peak (Note: The summit of North Shoshone Peak is the highest point of the Shoshone Mountains.)	Shoshone Mountains	10,318 ft 3144.9 m	2,853 ft 870 m	14.93 mi 24 km	39.1504°N 117.4800°W
30	Spruce Mountain (Note: The summit of Spruce Mountain is the highest point of the Pequop Mountains.)	Pequop Mountains	10,267 ft 3129.3 m	3,939 ft 1201 m	27.1 mi 43.6 km	40.5521°N 114.8217°W
31	Morey Peak (Note: The summit of Morey Peak is the highest point of the Hot Creek Range.)	Hot Creek Range	10,251 ft 3124.4 m	2,586 ft 788 m	20.6 mi 33.2 km	38.6276°N 116.2880°W
32	Mount Callaghan	Toiyabe Range	10,195 ft 3107.4 m	3,047 ft 929 m	24.5 mi 39.4 km	39.7094°N 116.9508°W
33	Quinn Canyon Range high point (Note: The elevation of Quinn Canyon Range high point includes an adjustment of +1.292 m (4.24 ft) from NGVD 29 to NAVD 88.)	Quinn Canyon Range	10,193 ft 3107 m	2,606 ft 794 m	15.55 mi 25 km	38.1223°N 115.7086°W
34	Roberts Creek Mountain	Roberts Mountains	10,132 ft 3088.1 m	3,584 ft 1092 m	32.3 mi 52.1 km	39.8699°N 116.3106°W
35	Becky Peak (Note: The elevation of Becky Peak includes an adjustment of +1.306 m (4.28 ft) from NGVD 29 to NAVD 88.)	Schell Creek Range	10,027 ft 3056 m	2,434 ft 742 m	15.56 mi 25 km	39.9718°N 114.6029°W
36	Desatoya Peak (Note: The summit of Desatoya Peak is the highest point of the Desatoya Mountains.)	Desatoya Mountains	9,979 ft 3041.69 m	3,545 ft 1081 m	21.1 mi 33.9 km	39.3652°N 117.7591°W
37	Mount Augusta (Note: The summit of Mount Augusta is the highest point of the Clan Alpine Mountains.)	Clan Alpine Mountains	9,970 ft 3038.9 m	4,386 ft 1337 m	14.8 mi 23.8 km	39.5399°N 117.9195°W
38	Hayford Peak (Note: The summit of Hayford Peak is the highest point of the Sheep Range.)	Sheep Range	9,924 ft 3024.9 m	5,412 ft 1650 m	33.8 mi 54.3 km	36.6577°N 115.2008°W
39	Star Peak (Note: The summit of Star Peak is the highest point of the Humboldt Range.)	Humboldt Range	9,840 ft 2999.1 m	5,400 ft 1646 m	69 mi 111.1 km	40.5224°N 118.1708°W
40	Mount Tobin (Note: The summit of Mount Tobin is the highest point of the Tobin Range.)	Tobin Range	9,778 ft 2980.4 m	4,851 ft 1479 m	35.4 mi 57 km	40.3765°N 117.5261°W
41	Granite Peak (Note: The summit of Granite Peak is the highest point of the Santa Rosa Range.)	Santa Rosa Range	9,732 ft 2966.3 m	4,400 ft 1341 m	82.4 mi 132.6 km	41.6681°N 117.5889°W
42	Mount Lewis (Note: The summit elevation of Mount Lewis includes a vertical offset of +0.305 m (1 ft) from the station benchmark.)	Shoshone Range	9,679 ft 2950.1 m	4,290 ft 1308 m	34.9 mi 56.2 km	40.4034°N 116.8615°W
43	Goshute Peak (Note: The summit of Goshute Peak is the highest point of the Goshute Range.)	Goshute Range	9,615 ft 2930.7 m	3,700 ft 1128 m	27.7 mi 44.5 km	40.4995°N 114.2955°W
44	Mount Siegel	Pine Nut Mountains	9,456 ft 2882.1 m	3,477 ft 1060 m	19.49 mi 31.4 km	38.8896°N 119.5022°W
45	Piper Peak (Note: The summit of Piper Peak is the highest point of the Silver Peak Range.)	Silver Peak Range	9,451 ft 2880.7 m	4,083 ft 1245 m	16.13 mi 26 km	37.7043°N 117.9088°W
46	Duffer Peak (Note: The summit of Duffer Peak is the highest point of the Pine Forest Range.) (Note: The elevation of Duffer Peak includes an adjustment of +1.337 m (4.39 ft) from NGVD 29 to NAVD 88.)	Pine Forest Range	9,432 ft 2875 m	4,139 ft 1262 m	55.1 mi 88.7 km	41.6574°N 118.7322°W
47	Kawich Peak (Note: The summit of Kawich Peak is the highest point of the Kawich Range.)	Kawich Range	9,406 ft 2867 m	3,101 ft 945 m	39.4 mi 63.5 km	37.9616°N 116.4617°W
48	Sonoma Peak (Note: The summit of Sonoma Peak is the highest point of the Sonoma Range.)	Sonoma Range	9,401 ft 2865.3 m	3,906 ft 1191 m	32.7 mi 52.6 km	40.8605°N 117.6071°W
49	Highland Peak (Note: The summit of Highland Peak is the highest point of the Highland Range.)	Highland Range	9,399 ft 2864.7 m	3,285 ft 1001 m	43.8 mi 70.4 km	37.8938°N 114.5787°W
50	Bald Mountain (Note: The summit of Bald Mountain is the highest point of the Groom Range.)	Groom Range	9,352 ft 2850.5 m	3,758 ft 1145 m	43 mi 69.2 km	37.4495°N 115.7337°W
51	Pilot Peak (Note: The summit of Pilot Peak is the highest point of the Pilot Mountains.)	Pilot Mountains	9,188 ft 2800.5 m	3,212 ft 979 m	33.6 mi 54.1 km	38.3430°N 117.9741°W

== Most prominent summits ==
Of the most prominent summits of Nevada, Charleston Peak and Wheeler Peak exceed 2000 meters (6562 feet) of topographic prominence, eight peaks are ultra-prominent summits with more than 1500 meters (4921 feet) of topographic prominence, and the following 52 peaks exceed 1400 meters (4593 feet).

The 52 most topographically prominent summits of Nevada
Rank	Mountain peak	Mountain range	Elevation	Prominence	Isolation	Location
1	Charleston Peak (Mount Charleston)	Spring Mountains	11,916 ft 3632 m	8,258 ft 2517 m	135.1 mi 218 km	36.2716°N 115.6956°W
2	Wheeler Peak	Snake Range	13,065 ft 3982.3 m	7,568 ft 2307 m	232 mi 373 km	38.9858°N 114.3139°W
3	Mount Jefferson	Toquima Range	11,946 ft 3641 m	5,871 ft 1789 m	98.6 mi 158.7 km	38.7519°N 116.9267°W
4	Pilot Peak	Pilot Range	10,720 ft 3267.6 m	5,731 ft 1747 m	53.7 mi 86.4 km	41.0211°N 114.0774°W
5	North Schell Peak	Schell Creek Range	11,895 ft 3625.6 m	5,413 ft 1650 m	23.5 mi 37.9 km	39.4132°N 114.5997°W
6	Hayford Peak	Sheep Range	9,924 ft 3024.9 m	5,412 ft 1650 m	33.8 mi 54.3 km	36.6577°N 115.2008°W
7	Star Peak	Humboldt Range	9,840 ft 2999.1 m	5,400 ft 1646 m	69 mi 111.1 km	40.5224°N 118.1708°W
8	Arc Dome	Toiyabe Range	11,778 ft 3590 m	5,233 ft 1595 m	23.1 mi 37.2 km	38.8327°N 117.3531°W
9	Mount Moriah	Snake Range	12,072 ft 3679.6 m	4,909 ft 1496 m	20.3 mi 32.7 km	39.2732°N 114.1988°W
10	Jackson Mountain (Note: The summit of Jackson Mountain is the highest point of the Jackson Mountains.) (Note: The elevation of Jackson Mountain includes an adjustment of +1.275 m (4.18 ft) from NGVD 29 to NAVD 88.)	Black Rock Desert	9,099 ft 2773 m	4,879 ft 1487 m	29.2 mi 46.9 km	41.3033°N 118.4163°W
11	Mount Tobin	Tobin Range	9,778 ft 2980.4 m	4,851 ft 1479 m	35.4 mi 57 km	40.3765°N 117.5261°W
12	Hole in the Mountain Peak	East Humboldt Range	11,311 ft 3448 m	4,849 ft 1478 m	26.6 mi 42.8 km	40.9508°N 115.1224°W
13	Ruby Dome	Ruby Mountains	11,392 ft 3472 m	4,810 ft 1466 m	94.7 mi 152.5 km	40.6217°N 115.4754°W
14	Troy Peak	Grant Range	11,302 ft 3445 m	4,790 ft 1460 m	40 mi 64.3 km	38.3194°N 115.5019°W
15	Matterhorn	Jarbidge Mountains	10,843 ft 3305 m	4,688 ft 1429 m	60.4 mi 97.2 km	41.8107°N 115.3745°W
16	Currant Mountain	White Pine Range	11,518 ft 3510.7 m	4,575 ft 1394 m	52.8 mi 85 km	38.9097°N 115.4246°W
17	Granite Peak	Santa Rosa Range	9,732 ft 2966.3 m	4,400 ft 1341 m	82.4 mi 132.6 km	41.6681°N 117.5889°W
18	Mount Augusta	Clan Alpine Mountains	9,970 ft 3038.9 m	4,386 ft 1337 m	14.8 mi 23.8 km	39.5399°N 117.9195°W
19	Mount Lewis	Shoshone Range	9,679 ft 2950.1 m	4,290 ft 1308 m	34.9 mi 56.2 km	40.4034°N 116.8615°W
20	McAfee Peak	Independence Mountains	10,442 ft 3182.8 m	4,168 ft 1270 m	35.6 mi 57.3 km	41.5217°N 115.9734°W
21	Duffer Peak	Pine Forest Range	9,432 ft 2875 m	4,139 ft 1262 m	55.1 mi 88.7 km	41.6574°N 118.7322°W
22	Piper Peak	Silver Peak Range	9,451 ft 2880.7 m	4,083 ft 1245 m	16.13 mi 26 km	37.7043°N 117.9088°W
23	Mormon Peak	Mormon Mountains	7,414 ft 2259.7 m	4,034 ft 1230 m	27.6 mi 44.4 km	36.9741°N 114.5006°W
24	Mount Grant	Wassuk Range	11,305 ft 3446 m	3,960 ft 1207 m	28.1 mi 45.2 km	38.5685°N 118.7911°W
25	Spruce Mountain	Pequop Mountains	10,267 ft 3129.3 m	3,939 ft 1201 m	27.1 mi 43.6 km	40.5521°N 114.8217°W
26	Job Peak (Note: The summit of Job Peak is the highest point of the Stillwater Range.)	Stillwater Range	8,785 ft 2678 m	3,915 ft 1193 m	17.13 mi 27.6 km	39.5832°N 118.2355°W
27	Sonoma Peak	Sonoma Range	9,401 ft 2865.3 m	3,906 ft 1191 m	32.7 mi 52.6 km	40.8605°N 117.6071°W
28	Lone Mountain	Lone Mountain	9,112 ft 2777.3 m	3,818 ft 1164 m	25.1 mi 40.4 km	38.0244°N 117.4944°W
29	Bald Mountain	Groom Range	9,352 ft 2850.5 m	3,758 ft 1145 m	43 mi 69.2 km	37.4495°N 115.7337°W
30	Cherry Creek Benchmark	Cherry Creek Range	10,527 ft 3208.5 m	3,734 ft 1138 m	34.3 mi 55.3 km	39.9662°N 114.8958°W
31	Goshute Peak	Goshute Range	9,615 ft 2930.7 m	3,700 ft 1128 m	27.7 mi 44.5 km	40.4995°N 114.2955°W
32	Kumiva Peak (Note: The summit of Kumiva Peak is the highest point of the Selenite Range.)	Selenite Range	8,241 ft 2511.8 m	3,686 ft 1123 m	25.6 mi 41.2 km	40.4061°N 119.2632°W
33	Ward Mountain	Egan Range	10,941 ft 3334.8 m	3,676 ft 1120 m	18.41 mi 29.6 km	39.1002°N 114.9206°W
34	Table Mountain	Monitor Range	10,894 ft 3320.5 m	3,668 ft 1118 m	17.4 mi 28 km	38.8118°N 116.5883°W
35	Virginia Peak (Note: The summit of Virginia Peak is the highest point of the Pah Rah Range.)	Pah Rah Range	8,302 ft 2530.4 m	3,658 ft 1115 m	21.4 mi 34.4 km	39.7540°N 119.4621°W
36	Mount Rose	Carson Range	10,785 ft 3287.2 m	3,630 ft 1106 m	33.2 mi 53.5 km	39.3438°N 119.9179°W
37	Pearl Peak	Ruby Mountains	10,852 ft 3307.6 m	3,628 ft 1106 m	13.37 mi 21.5 km	40.2352°N 115.5407°W
38	Diamond Peak	Diamond Mountains	10,631 ft 3240.3 m	3,604 ft 1099 m	27.9 mi 44.9 km	39.5849°N 115.8187°W
39	Roberts Creek Mountain	Roberts Mountains	10,132 ft 3088.1 m	3,584 ft 1092 m	32.3 mi 52.1 km	39.8699°N 116.3106°W
40	Adam Peak (Note: The summit of Adam Peak is the highest point of the Osgood Mountains.)	Osgood Mountains	8,681 ft 2646 m	3,568 ft 1088 m	24.7 mi 39.8 km	41.1607°N 117.3055°W
41	Orevada View Benchmark (Note: The summit of Orevada View Benchmark is the highest point of the Trout Creek Mountains.)	Trout Creek Mountains	8,510 ft 2593.8 m	3,548 ft 1081 m	23.5 mi 37.8 km	41.9793°N 118.2230°W
42	Mount Moses (Note: The summit of Mount Moses is the highest point of the Fish Creek Mountains.)	Fish Creek Mountains	8,649 ft 2636.3 m	3,546 ft 1081 m	16.88 mi 27.2 km	40.1472°N 117.4154°W
43	Desatoya Peak	Desatoya Mountains	9,979 ft 3041.69 m	3,545 ft 1081 m	21.1 mi 33.9 km	39.3652°N 117.7591°W
44	Tohakum Peak (Note: The summit of Tohakum Peak is the highest point of the Lake Range.) (Note: The elevation of Tohakum Peak includes an adjustment of +1.111 m (3.65 ft) from NGVD 29 to NAVD 88.)	Lake Range	8,186 ft 2495 m	3,509 ft 1070 m	18.64 mi 30 km	40.1794°N 119.4551°W
45	Mount Siegel	Pine Nut Mountains	9,456 ft 2882.1 m	3,477 ft 1060 m	19.49 mi 31.4 km	38.8896°N 119.5022°W
46	Granite Peak (Note: The summit of Granite Peak is the highest point of the Granite Range.) (Note: The elevation of Granite Peak includes an adjustment of +1.167 m (3.83 ft) from NGVD 29 to NAVD 88.)	Granite Range	8,984 ft 2738 m	3,470 ft 1058 m	49.1 mi 79 km	40.7911°N 119.4333°W
47	Tule Peak (Note: The summit of Tule Peak is the highest point of the Virginia Mountains.)	Virginia Mountains	8,726 ft 2659.7 m	3,425 ft 1044 m	32.1 mi 51.7 km	39.9760°N 119.7441°W
48	North Peak (Note: The summit of North Peak is the highest point of Battle Mountain.)	Battle Mountain	8,554 ft 2607.2 m	3,340 ft 1018 m	22.2 mi 35.8 km	40.6750°N 117.1325°W
49	Seaman Range high point (Note: The elevation of Seaman Range high point includes an adjustment of +1.175 m (3.85 ft) from NGVD 29 to NAVD 88.)	Seaman Range	8,610 ft 2624 m	3,336 ft 1017 m	27 mi 43.5 km	37.9807°N 115.1015°W
50	Eugene Mountains high point (Note: The elevation of Eugene Mountains high point includes an adjustment of +1.107 m (3.63 ft) from NGVD 29 to NAVD 88.)	Eugene Mountains	7,586 ft 2312 m	3,325 ft 1013 m	19.24 mi 31 km	40.8359°N 118.1852°W
51	Jumbo Peak (Note: The elevation of Jumbo Peak includes an adjustment of +0.726 m (2.38 ft) from NGVD 29 to NAVD 88.)	Virgin Mountains	5,763 ft 1757 m	3,317 ft 1011 m	20.1 mi 32.4 km	36.2065°N 114.1809°W
52	Highland Peak	Highland Range	9,399 ft 2864.7 m	3,285 ft 1001 m	43.8 mi 70.4 km	37.8938°N 114.5787°W

== Most isolated major summits ==
Of the most isolated major summits of Nevada, Wheeler Peak and Charleston Peak exceed 200 kilometers (124.3 miles) of topographic isolation and six peaks exceed 100 kilometers (62.14 miles) of topographic isolation.

The 50 most topographically isolated summits of Nevada with at least 500 meters of topographic prominence
Rank	Mountain peak	Mountain range	Elevation	Prominence		
1	Wheeler Peak	Snake Range	13,065 ft 3982.3 m	7,568 ft 2307 m	232 mi 373 km	38.9858°N 114.3139°W
2	Charleston Peak (Mount Charleston)	Spring Mountains	11,916 ft 3632 m	8,258 ft 2517 m	135.1 mi 218 km	36.2716°N 115.6956°W
3	Mount Jefferson	Toquima Range	11,946 ft 3641 m	5,871 ft 1789 m	98.6 mi 158.7 km	38.7519°N 116.9267°W
4	Ruby Dome	Ruby Mountains	11,392 ft 3472 m	4,810 ft 1466 m	94.7 mi 152.5 km	40.6217°N 115.4754°W
5	Granite Peak	Santa Rosa Range	9,732 ft 2966.3 m	4,400 ft 1341 m	82.4 mi 132.6 km	41.6681°N 117.5889°W
6	Star Peak	Humboldt Range	9,840 ft 2999.1 m	5,400 ft 1646 m	69 mi 111.1 km	40.5224°N 118.1708°W
7	Matterhorn	Jarbidge Mountains	10,843 ft 3305 m	4,688 ft 1429 m	60.4 mi 97.2 km	41.8107°N 115.3745°W
8	Virgin Peak (Note: The summit of Virgin Peak is the highest point of the Virgin Mountains.) (Note: The elevation of Virgin Peak includes an adjustment of +0.888 m (2.91 ft) from NGVD 29 to NAVD 88.)	Virgin Mountains	8,090 ft 2466 m	3,215 ft 980 m	56.8 mi 91.5 km	36.6027°N 114.1123°W
9	Duffer Peak	Pine Forest Range	9,432 ft 2875 m	4,139 ft 1262 m	55.1 mi 88.7 km	41.6574°N 118.7322°W
10	Pilot Peak	Pilot Range	10,720 ft 3267.6 m	5,731 ft 1747 m	53.7 mi 86.4 km	41.0211°N 114.0774°W
11	Currant Mountain	White Pine Range	11,518 ft 3510.7 m	4,575 ft 1394 m	52.8 mi 85 km	38.9097°N 115.4246°W
12	Granite Peak	Granite Range	8,984 ft 2738 m	3,470 ft 1058 m	49.1 mi 79 km	40.7911°N 119.4333°W
13	Highland Peak	Highland Range	9,399 ft 2864.7 m	3,285 ft 1001 m	43.8 mi 70.4 km	37.8938°N 114.5787°W
14	Bald Mountain	Groom Range	9,352 ft 2850.5 m	3,758 ft 1145 m	43 mi 69.2 km	37.4495°N 115.7337°W
15	Troy Peak	Grant Range	11,302 ft 3445 m	4,790 ft 1460 m	40 mi 64.3 km	38.3194°N 115.5019°W
16	Kawich Peak	Kawich Range	9,406 ft 2867 m	3,101 ft 945 m	39.4 mi 63.5 km	37.9616°N 116.4617°W
17	McAfee Peak	Independence Mountains	10,442 ft 3182.8 m	4,168 ft 1270 m	35.6 mi 57.3 km	41.5217°N 115.9734°W
18	Mount Tobin	Tobin Range	9,778 ft 2980.4 m	4,851 ft 1479 m	35.4 mi 57 km	40.3765°N 117.5261°W
19	Mount Lewis	Shoshone Range	9,679 ft 2950.1 m	4,290 ft 1308 m	34.9 mi 56.2 km	40.4034°N 116.8615°W
20	Cherry Creek Benchmark	Cherry Creek Range	10,527 ft 3208.5 m	3,734 ft 1138 m	34.3 mi 55.3 km	39.9662°N 114.8958°W
21	Hayford Peak	Sheep Range	9,924 ft 3024.9 m	5,412 ft 1650 m	33.8 mi 54.3 km	36.6577°N 115.2008°W
22	Pilot Peak	Pilot Mountains	9,188 ft 2800.5 m	3,212 ft 979 m	33.6 mi 54.1 km	38.3430°N 117.9741°W
23	Mount Rose	Carson Range	10,785 ft 3287.2 m	3,630 ft 1106 m	33.2 mi 53.5 km	39.3438°N 119.9179°W
24	Sonoma Peak	Sonoma Range	9,401 ft 2865.3 m	3,906 ft 1191 m	32.7 mi 52.6 km	40.8605°N 117.6071°W
25	Roberts Creek Mountain	Roberts Mountains	10,132 ft 3088.1 m	3,584 ft 1092 m	32.3 mi 52.1 km	39.8699°N 116.3106°W
26	Tule Peak	Virginia Mountains	8,726 ft 2659.7 m	3,425 ft 1044 m	32.1 mi 51.7 km	39.9760°N 119.7441°W
27	Bunker Hill	Toiyabe Range	11,477 ft 3498.3 m	2,813 ft 857 m	31.3 mi 50.3 km	39.2529°N 117.1261°W
28	Summit Mountain	Monitor Range	10,468 ft 3190.7 m	2,721 ft 829 m	29.2 mi 47 km	39.3767°N 116.4620°W
29	Jackson Mountain	Black Rock Desert	9,099 ft 2773 m	4,879 ft 1487 m	29.2 mi 46.9 km	41.3033°N 118.4163°W
30	Mount Grant	Wassuk Range	11,305 ft 3446 m	3,960 ft 1207 m	28.1 mi 45.2 km	38.5685°N 118.7911°W
31	Diamond Peak	Diamond Mountains	10,631 ft 3240.3 m	3,604 ft 1099 m	27.9 mi 44.9 km	39.5849°N 115.8187°W
32	Goshute Peak	Goshute Range	9,615 ft 2930.7 m	3,700 ft 1128 m	27.7 mi 44.5 km	40.4995°N 114.2955°W
33	Mormon Peak	Mormon Mountains	7,414 ft 2259.7 m	4,034 ft 1230 m	27.6 mi 44.4 km	36.9741°N 114.5006°W
34	Spruce Mountain	Pequop Mountains	10,267 ft 3129.3 m	3,939 ft 1201 m	27.1 mi 43.6 km	40.5521°N 114.8217°W
35	Seaman Range high point	Seaman Range	8,610 ft 2624 m	3,336 ft 1017 m	27 mi 43.5 km	37.9807°N 115.1015°W
36	Mount Grafton	Schell Creek Range	10,997 ft 3351.8 m	3,257 ft 993 m	26.8 mi 43.2 km	38.6922°N 114.7424°W
37	Hole in the Mountain Peak	East Humboldt Range	11,311 ft 3448 m	4,849 ft 1478 m	26.6 mi 42.8 km	40.9508°N 115.1224°W
38	Kumiva Peak	Selenite Range	8,241 ft 2511.8 m	3,686 ft 1123 m	25.6 mi 41.2 km	40.4061°N 119.2632°W
39	Lone Mountain	Lone Mountain	9,112 ft 2777.3 m	3,818 ft 1164 m	25.1 mi 40.4 km	38.0244°N 117.4944°W
40	Adam Peak	Osgood Mountains	8,681 ft 2646 m	3,568 ft 1088 m	24.7 mi 39.8 km	41.1607°N 117.3055°W
41	Mount Callaghan	Toiyabe Range	10,195 ft 3107.4 m	3,047 ft 929 m	24.5 mi 39.4 km	39.7094°N 116.9508°W
42	North Schell Peak	Schell Creek Range	11,895 ft 3625.6 m	5,413 ft 1650 m	23.5 mi 37.9 km	39.4132°N 114.5997°W
43	Orevada View Benchmark	Trout Creek Mountains	8,510 ft 2593.8 m	3,548 ft 1081 m	23.5 mi 37.8 km	41.9793°N 118.2230°W
44	Arc Dome	Toiyabe Range	11,778 ft 3590 m	5,233 ft 1595 m	23.1 mi 37.2 km	38.8327°N 117.3531°W
45	North Peak	Battle Mountain	8,554 ft 2607.2 m	3,340 ft 1018 m	22.2 mi 35.8 km	40.6750°N 117.1325°W
46	Virginia Peak	Pah Rah Range	8,302 ft 2530.4 m	3,658 ft 1115 m	21.4 mi 34.4 km	39.7540°N 119.4621°W
47	Desatoya Peak	Desatoya Mountains	9,979 ft 3041.69 m	3,545 ft 1081 m	21.1 mi 33.9 km	39.3652°N 117.7591°W
48	Morey Peak	Hot Creek Range	10,251 ft 3124.4 m	2,586 ft 788 m	20.6 mi 33.2 km	38.6276°N 116.2880°W
49	Mount Moriah	Snake Range	12,072 ft 3679.6 m	4,909 ft 1496 m	20.3 mi 32.7 km	39.2732°N 114.1988°W
50	Jumbo Peak	Virgin Mountains	5,763 ft 1757 m	3,317 ft 1011 m	20.1 mi 32.4 km	36.2065°N 114.1809°W

== Gallery ==
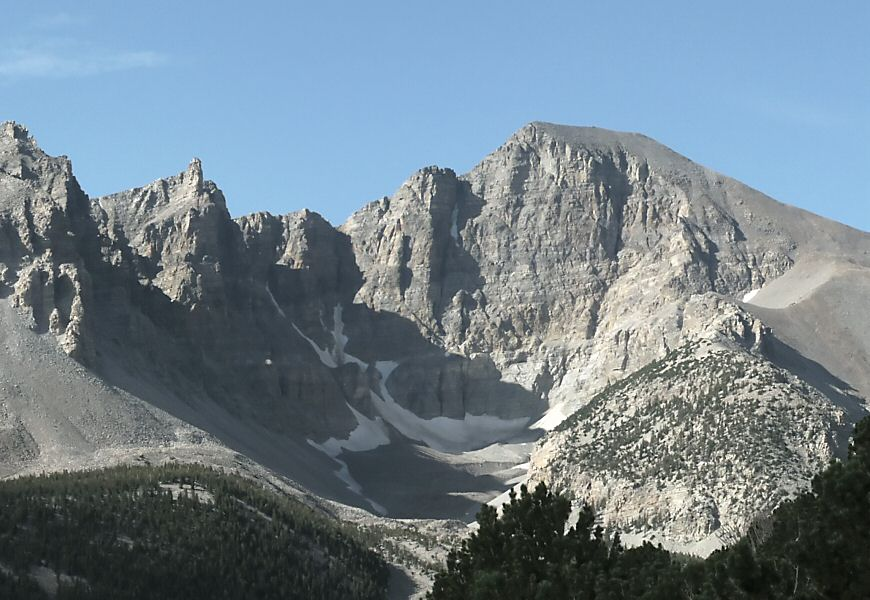
Wheeler Peak

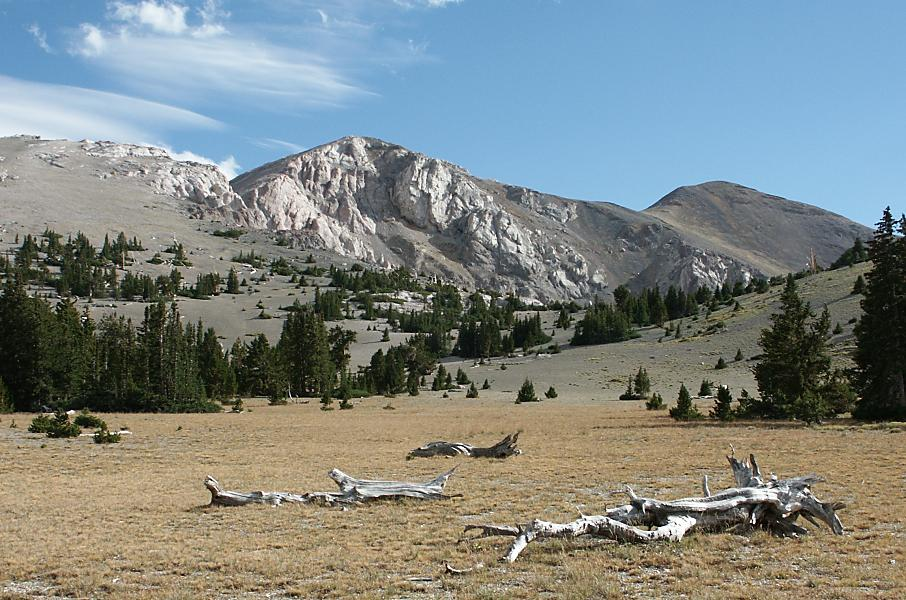
Mount Moriah

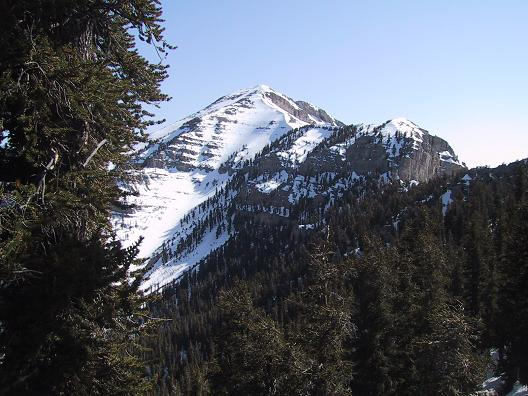
Charleston Peak

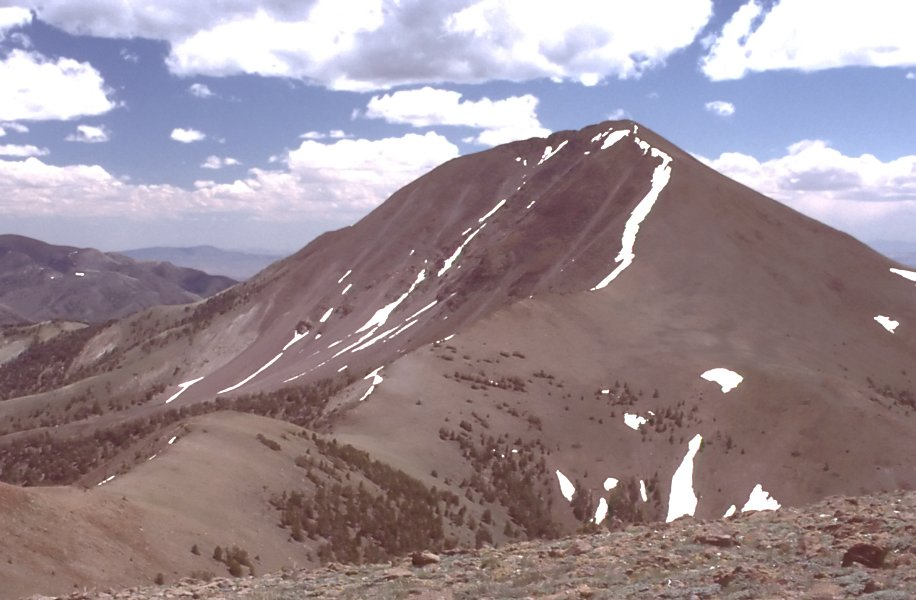
Arc Dome

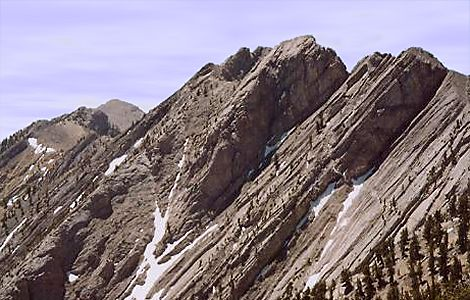
Currant Mountain

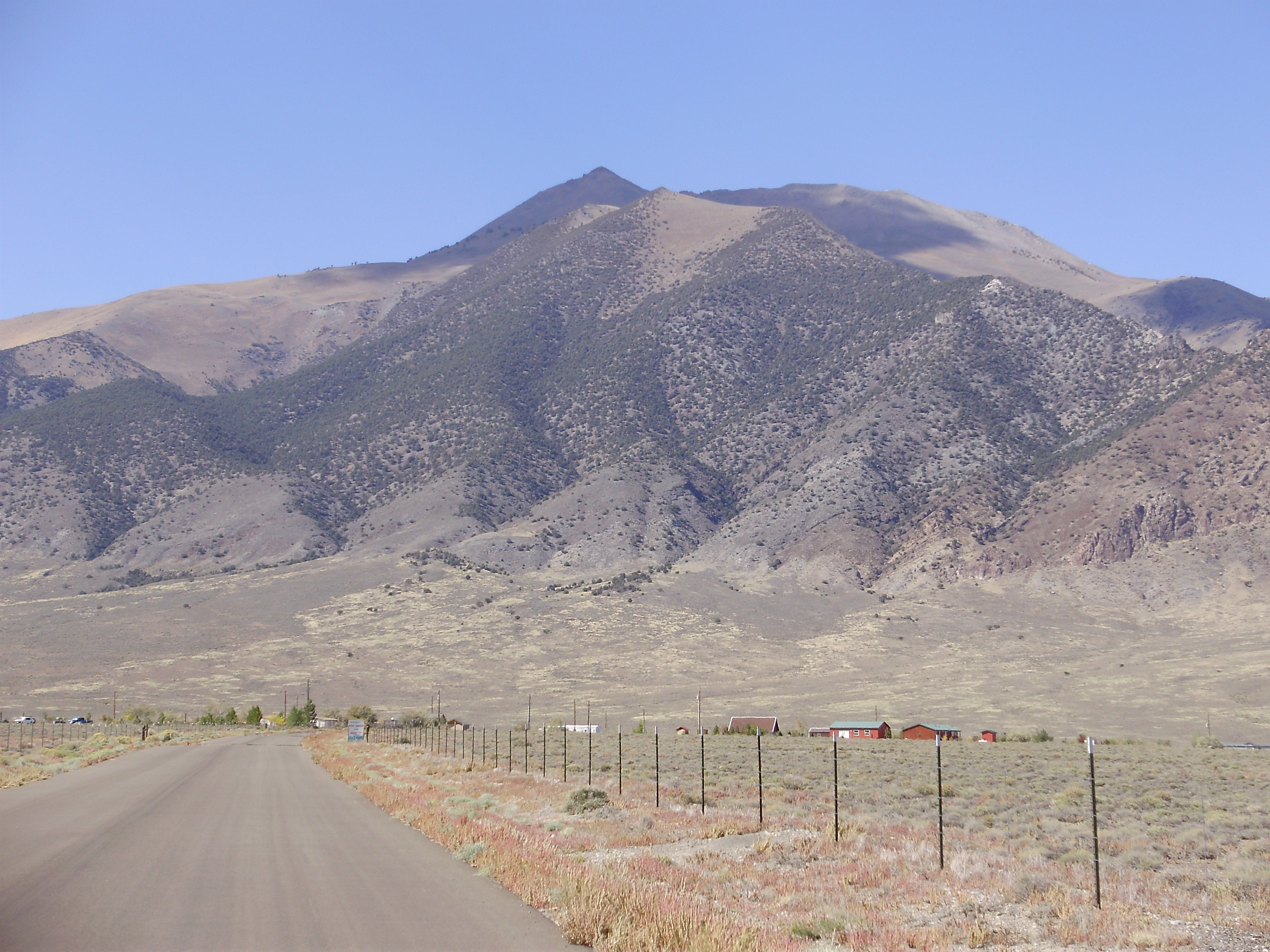
Bunker Hill

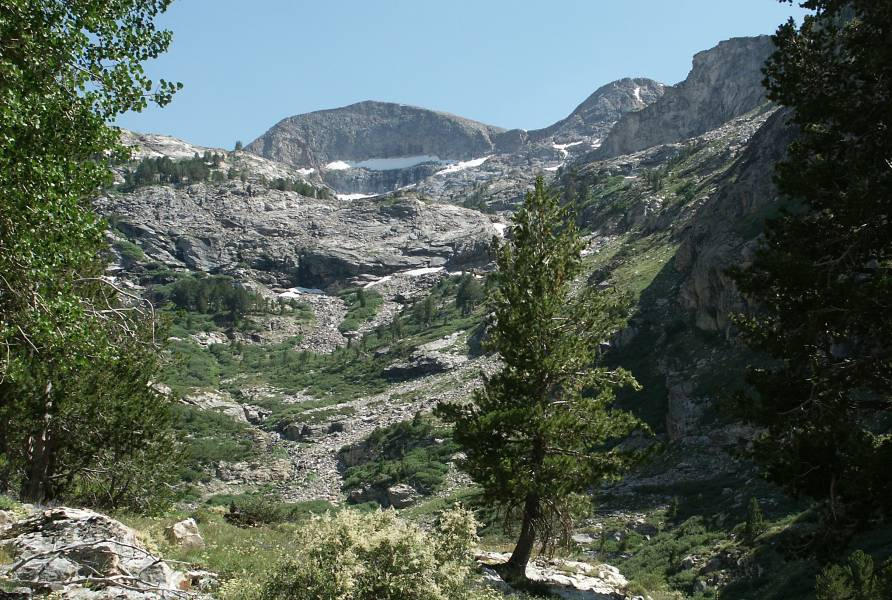
Ruby Dome

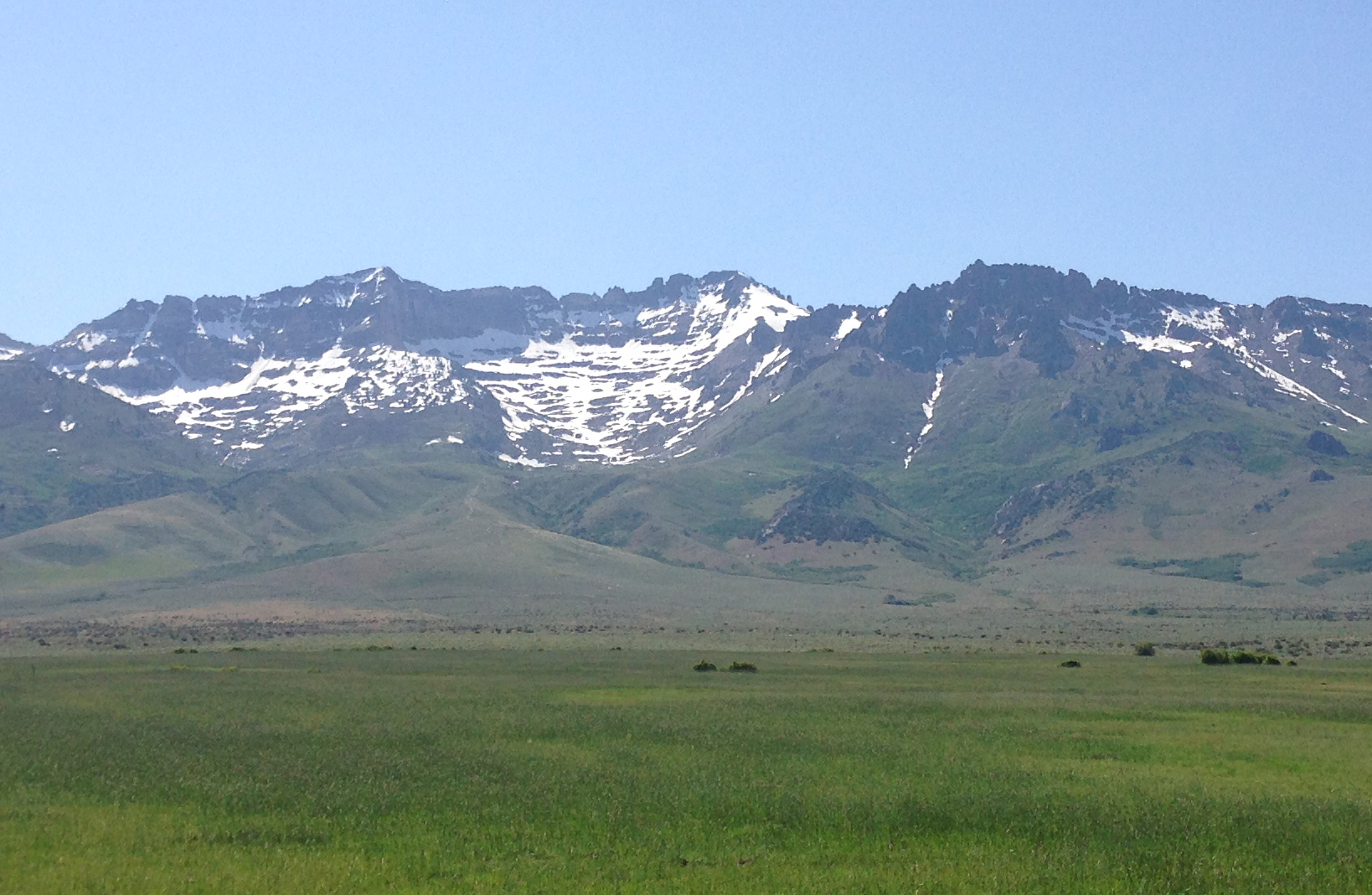
Hole in the Mountain Peak

== See also ==
- List of mountain peaks of North America
  - List of mountain peaks of Greenland
  - List of mountain peaks of Canada
  - List of mountain peaks of the Rocky Mountains
  - List of mountain peaks of the United States
    - List of mountain peaks of Alaska
    - List of mountain peaks of Arizona
    - List of mountain peaks of California
    - List of mountain peaks of Colorado
    - List of mountain peaks of Hawaiʻi
    - List of mountain peaks of Idaho
    - List of mountain peaks of Montana
    - List of mountain peaks of Nevada
      - List of mountains of the United States#Nevada
      - List of mountain ranges of Nevada
    - List of mountain peaks of New Mexico
    - List of mountain peaks of Oregon
    - List of mountain peaks of Utah
    - List of mountain peaks of Washington (state)
    - List of mountain peaks of Wyoming
  - List of mountain peaks of México
  - List of mountain peaks of Central America
  - List of mountain peaks of the Caribbean
- Nevada
  - Geography of Nevada
    - Category:Mountains of Nevada
      - commons:Category:Mountains of Nevada
- Physical geography
  - Topography
    - Topographic elevation
    - Topographic prominence
    - Topographic isolation
