= Lake Range =

Mountain range in Nevada, United States

- Location within Nevada

Highest point
- Peak: Tohakum Peak
- Elevation: 2,494 m (8,182 ft)

Geography
- Country: United States
- State: Nevada
- District: Washoe County
- Range coordinates: 40°10.8′N 119°27.3′W
- Topo map(s): USGS Nixon NW; Dove Creek; Tohakum Peak NW; San Emidio Desert South; 7.5 minute quads

The Lake Range is a mountain range located in western Nevada in the United States. It is entirely in Washoe County, and the southern two-thirds are in the Pyramid Lake Indian Reservation. The range runs north-south for approximately 36 miles (58 km) and a width of generally less than 8 mi (13 km).

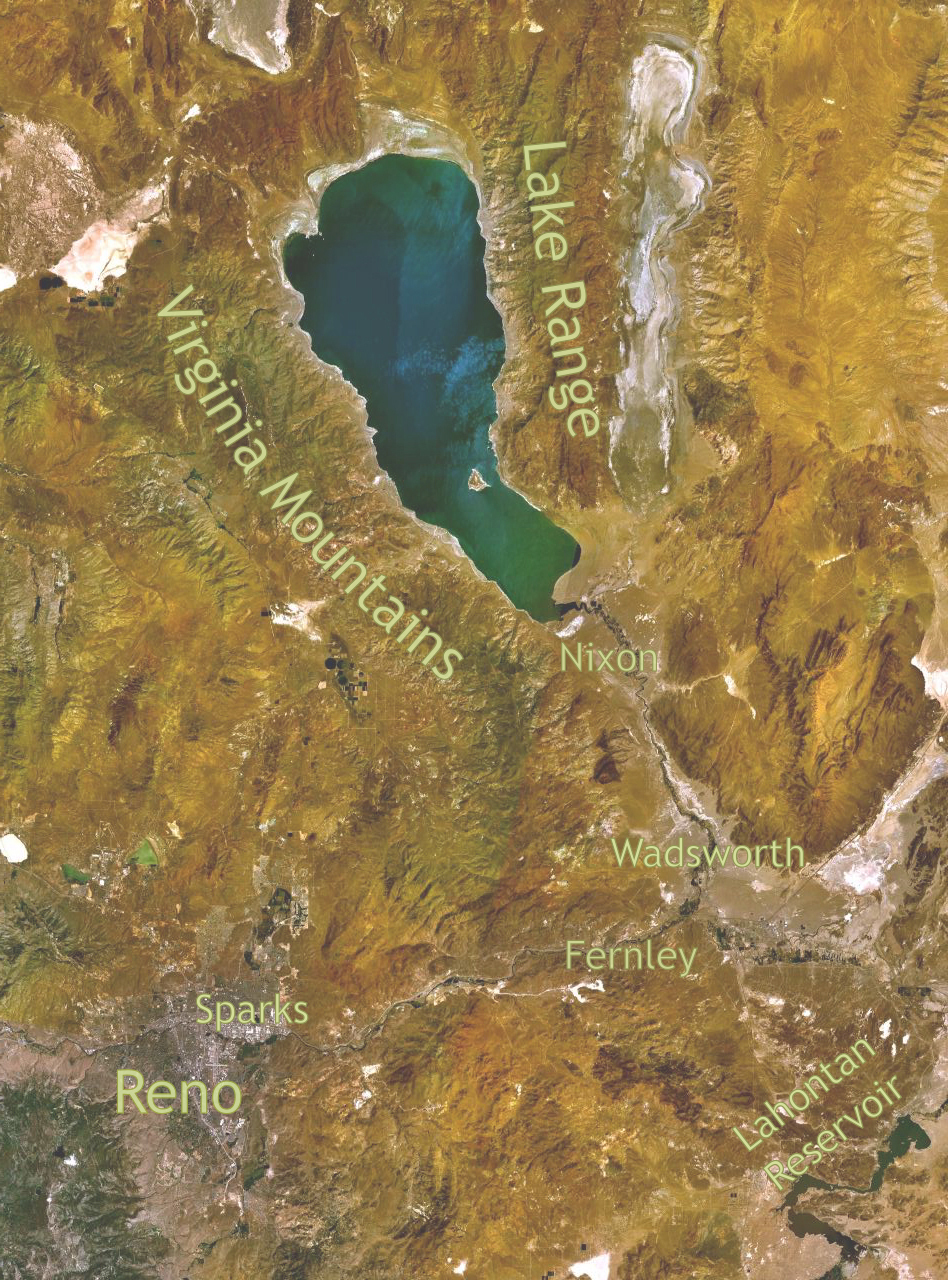
NASA Landsat view of the Lake Range and surrounding area

The range is situated between Pyramid Lake to the west and the dry Winnemucca Lake to the east. To the southeast is the Mud Lake Slough, which previously connected Pyramid Lake to Winnemucca Lake. To the northwest is the San Emido Desert with the Fox Range beyond. To the east, Winnemucca Lake separates the Lake Range from the Nightingale Mountains and the Selenite Range. To the west, beyond Pyramid Lake are the Virginia and the Pah Rah ranges.

The named peaks of the Lake Range are (in order from north to south) Sweetwater Peak 7,114 ft (2,168 m), Wildcat Peak 5,843 ft (1,781 m), Tohakum Peak 8,182 ft (2,494 m) and Pyramid Peak 8,101 ft (2,469 m)).

The Lake Range is the site of the final skirmish of the second battle of the Pyramid Lake War.
