= Tobin Range =

Mountain range in Nevada, United States

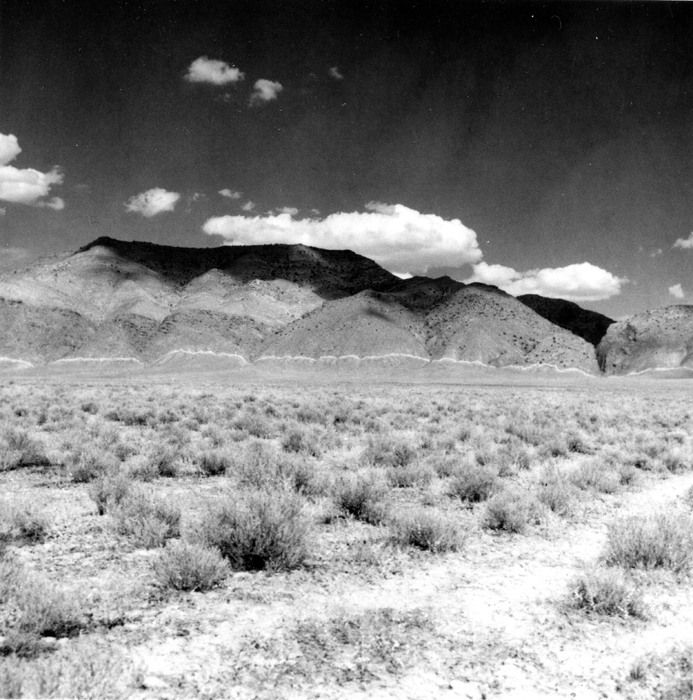
- West side of the Tobin Range showing the 1915 earthquake scarp as an irregular white line along the mountain base

Highest point
- Peak: Mount Tobin
- Elevation: 2,973 m (9,754 ft)
- Coordinates: 40°22′37″N 117°31′33″W

Dimensions
- Length: 32.5 mi (52.3 km) NNE
- Width: 6 mi (9.7 km)

Geography
- Location within Nevada
- Country: United States
- State: Nevada
- District: Pershing County
- Range coordinates: 40°26′17″N 117°30′42″W
- Topo map(s): USGS Fish Creek Mts, NV and Winnemucca, NV 30x60 minute

The Tobin Range is a mountain range in eastern Pershing County, Nevada. The linear range is typical of the basin and range structure with an approximate length and width of 32.5 miles (52.3 km) by 6 miles (9.7 km) with a NNE orientation. The Tobin Range includes Mount Tobin, a 9,754 feet (2,973 m) summit that dominates the surrounding area. Mount Tobin has a latitude of 40°22′37″N and a longitude of 117°31′33″W.

To the north the Tobins are separated from Buffalo Mountain in Humboldt County by Smelser Pass and to the northeast from the Battle Mountains in Lander County by the broad Buffalo Valley. To the east and southeast lie the Fish Creek Mountains and the small Augusta Mountains. To the west and southwest lie the East Range and the Stillwater Range across Pleasant Valley. To the northwest is the Sonoma Range in Humboldt County.

The 1915 Pleasant Valley earthquake produced dramatic fault scarps along the west margin of the range with up to 5.8 metres (19 ft) of vertical displacement. publisher Tobin Range was named after Clement L. Tobin.
