= Mount Augusta (disambiguation) =

Mount Augusta is a mountain in the Saint Elias Mountains along the border of Alaska, United States and Yukon Territory, Canada.

Mount Augusta can also refer to:

- Mount Augusta (Antarctica), a mountain in the Queen Alexandra Range of Antarctica
- Mount Augusta (Nevada), a mountain in Churchill County, Nevada
