= Wassuk Range =

Mountain range in Nevada, United States

Coordinates: 38°34′19″N 118°50′21″W

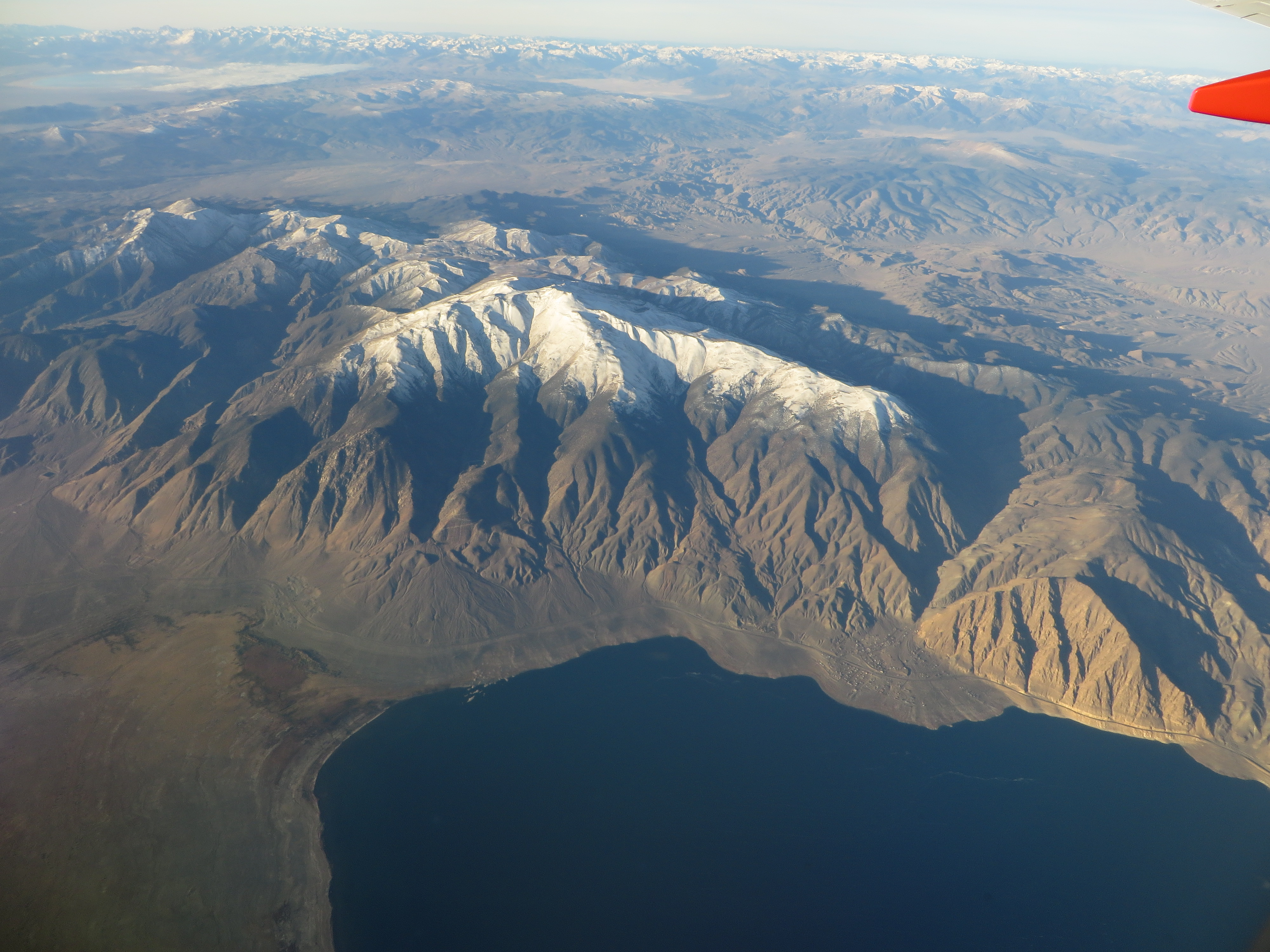

Highest point
- Elevation: 11,239 (Mount Grant)

Geography
- Country: United States
- State: Nevada

The Wassuk Range is located in west-central Nevada in the United States. It is found to the west of Walker Lake in Mineral County.

The mountains reach an elevation of 11,239 feet (3,425 m) at Mount Grant, approximately eight miles northwest of Hawthorne. The mountains lie in a north-south direction west of Highway 95, and cover an area of 1,170 km² (451 sq mi). They form one side of the Mason Valley. The Northern Paiute word for the range is Kaiba.

The range, and specifically Mount Grant (Northern Paiute: Kurangwa), play a major role in the creation story of the groups of Northern Paiute people whose ancestors periodically lived near the mountain during their seasonal migrations. Kurangwa is a sacred being to them and is responsible for the creation of the Walker Lake (Agai Pah).

== Highest peaks ==
- Mount Grant
- Cory Peak
- East Cory Peak
- Big Indian Mountain
