= Pearl Peak =

Peak in Ruby Mountains, Nevada, USA

- Location within Nevada

Highest point
- Elevation: 10,777 ft (3,285 m)
- Prominence: 3,608 ft (1,100 m)
- Parent peak: Tipton Peak
- Isolation: 13.37 mi (21.52 km)
- Coordinates: 40°14′07″N 115°32′31″W

Geography
- Location: Elko County, Nevada
- Parent range: Ruby Mountains
- Topo map: USGS Pearl Peak

Pearl Peak is a 10,777-foot (3,285 m) summit in the southern part of the Ruby Mountains, in Elko County, Nevada in the United States. The peak, which is within the Humboldt-Toiyabe National Forest, is primarily composed of Ordovician to early Devonian dolomite and limestone, with minor amounts of sandstone and quartzite. It hosts a stand of bristlecone pine.

Pearl Peak is about 40 miles (64 km) south of Elko and 50 miles (80 km) north of Eureka. The Ruby Lake National Wildlife Refuge is located a short distance to the southeast.

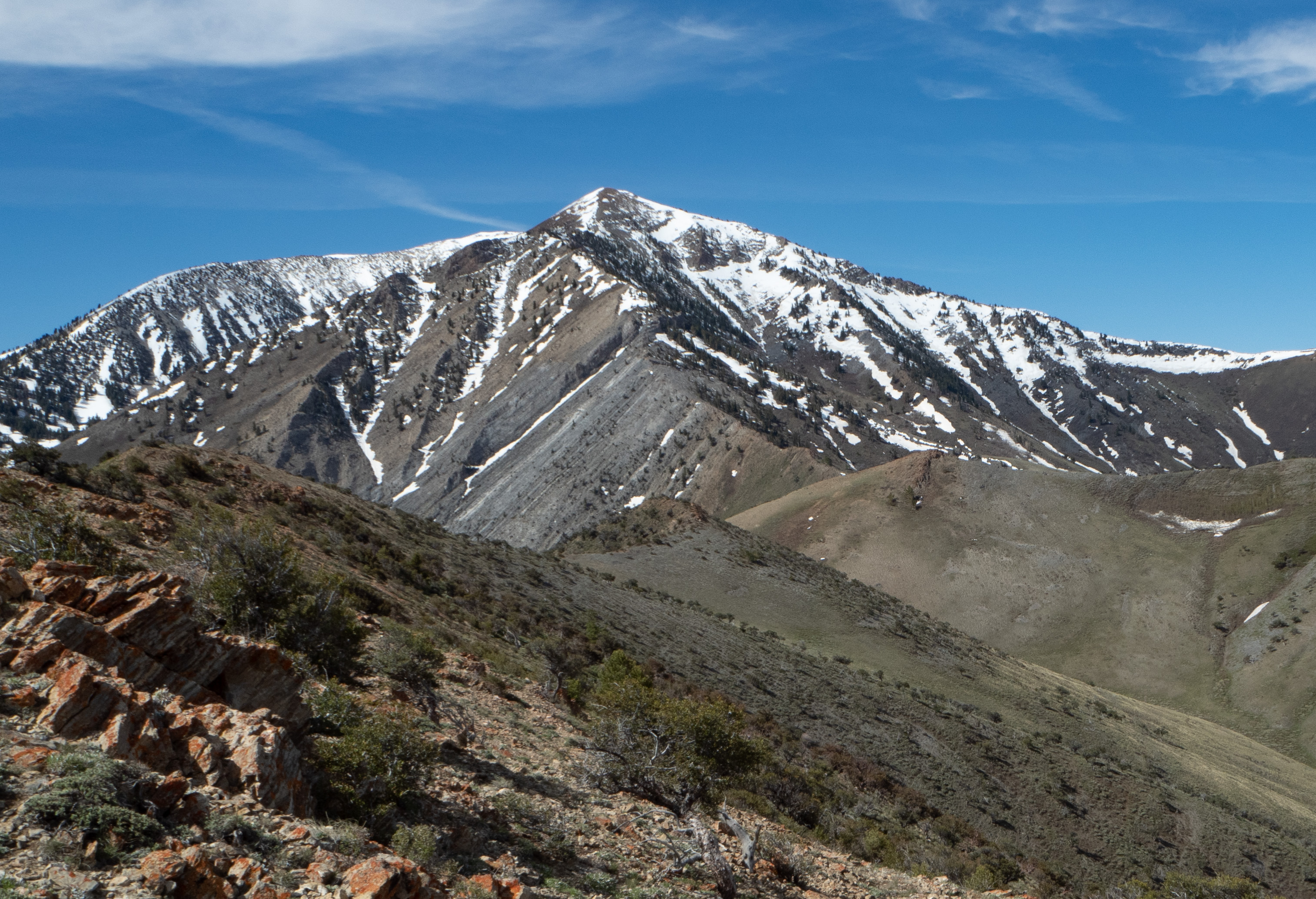
North ridge of Pearl Peak, Nevada

== See also ==
- List of mountain peaks of Nevada
