= List of highest points in Nevada by county =

This is a list of highest points in the U.S. state of Nevada, in alphabetical order by county.

All elevations use the North American Vertical Datum of 1988 (NAVD88), the currently accepted vertical control datum for United States, Canada and Mexico. Elevations are from the National Geodetic Survey when available. Others are from the United States Geological Survey topographic maps when available. Elevations followed by a plus sign (+) were interpolated using topographic map contour lines. The true elevation is between that shown and the elevation plus forty feet since the relevant topographic maps all use 40-foot contours.

Boundary Peak is the highest peak in terms of elevation, however, it has only 253 feet of clean prominence and so is usually considered a subsidiary peak of Montgomery Peak in California. Wheeler Peak, the next highest, has a clean prominence of 7,563 feet.

County	Name	Height feet / m	Source
Carson City	Snow Valley Peak	9,218 / 2,809	PB
Churchill	Desatoya Peak	9,977 / 3,041	NGS
Clark	Mount Charleston	11,916 / 3,632	NGS
Douglas	East Peak	9,595 / 2,924	PB
Elko	Ruby Dome	11,392 / 3,472	PB
Esmeralda	Boundary Peak	13,147 / 4,007	NGS
Eureka	Diamond Peak	10,631 / 3,240	NGS
Humboldt	Granite Peak	9,736 / 2,967	PB
Lander	Bunker Hill	11,477 / 3,498	NGS
Lincoln	Mount Grafton (South Ridge)	10,645+ / 3,244+	PB
Lyon	Middle Sister (Northeast Ridge)	10,565+ / 3,221+	PB
Mineral	Mount Grant	11,285+ / 3,439+	PB
Nye	Mount Jefferson	11,946 / 3,642	PB
Pershing	Star Peak	9,840 / 2,999	NGS
Storey	Mount Davidson	7,868 / 2,398	NGS
Washoe	Mount Rose	10,785 / 3,287	NGS
White Pine	Wheeler Peak	13,065 / 3,982	NGS
