= Clan Alpine Mountains =

Mountain range in Nevada, U.S.

- Location within Nevada

Highest point
- Peak: Mount Augusta
- Elevation: 3,038 m (9,967 ft)
- Coordinates: 39°32′23″N 117°55′11″W

Geography
- Country: United States
- State: Nevada
- District: Churchill County
- Range coordinates: 39°33′10″N 117°54′44″W
- Topo map: USGS Mount Augusta

The Clan Alpine Mountains are a mountain range located in west-central Nevada in the United States. The range lies in a southwest-northeasterly direction in Churchill County, and contains Mount Augusta, at 9,967 feet (3,038 m) above sea level. The mountains lie to the west of the Desatoya Mountains and southeast of the Stillwater Range. The Augusta Mountains lie to the northeast and the New Pass Range to the east. A large part of the range, 196,128 acres (793.70 km^{2}), lies within the Clan Alpine Mountains Wilderness Study Area. The Clan Alpine Mountains lie to the north and northwest of Highway 50.

Clan Alpine Mountains took its name from a nearby mining district. At least eight mines are located in the northwestern part of the range north of Healy Peak in the Bernice and Hoyt canyons on the northwest flank of the range. This mine group was worked from 1866 and known as the Bernice, Salina or Alamo district. The mines produced antimony, silver, gold and tungsten.
