= East Peak (Douglas County, Nevada) =

Highest point in Douglas County, Nevada

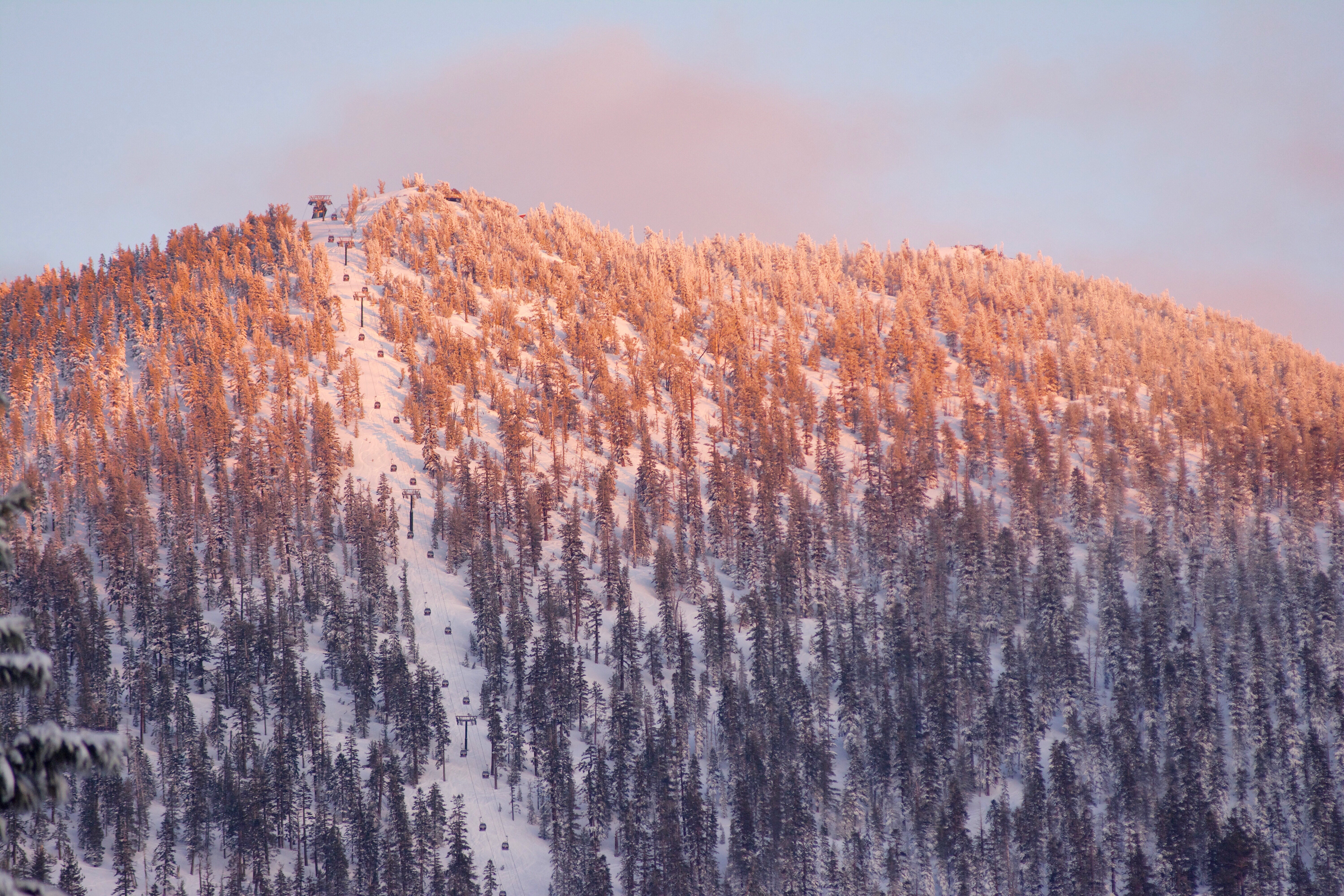

Highest point
- Elevation: 9,595 ft (2,925 m) NAVD 88
- Prominence: 311 ft (95 m)
- Listing: Nevada County High Points 15th; Great Basin Peaks List
- Coordinates: 38°56′33″N 119°54′26″W

Geography
- Location within Nevada
- Location: Douglas County, Nevada, U.S.
- Parent range: Carson Range
- Topo map: USGS South Lake Tahoe

East Peak is a mountain in the Carson Range of western Nevada, United States. It is the highest point in Douglas County. The summit is in the Heavenly ski area and is the location of East Peak Lodge.
