= Duffer Peak =

Mountain in Nevada, United States

- Location within Nevada

Highest point
- Elevation: 9,432 ft (2,875 m) NAVD 88
- Prominence: 4,139 ft (1,262 m)
- Coordinates: 41°39′43″N 118°43′49″W

Geography
- Location: Humboldt County, Nevada, U.S.

Duffer Peak is the highest mountain in the Pine Forest Range of northwestern Humboldt County, Nevada, United States. It ranks twenty-second among the most topographically prominent peaks in the state. The peak is located on public land managed by the Bureau of Land Management and thus has no access restrictions.
