= Sonoma Peak =

Mountain in Nevada, United States

- Location within Nevada

Highest point
- Elevation: 9,396 ft (2,864 m) NAVD 88
- Prominence: 3,916 ft (1,194 m)
- Coordinates: 40°51′36″N 117°36′30″W

Geography
- Location: Humboldt County, Nevada, U.S.
- Parent range: Sonoma Range

Sonoma Peak is a mountain located in southeastern Humboldt County, Nevada, United States. With an elevation of 9,396 feet (2,864 m), it is the highest mountain in the Sonoma Range. The peak is also the 28th most prominent peak in Nevada.
