= Pine Forest Range =

Mountain range in Humboldt County, Nevada, United States

- Location within Nevada

Highest point
- Peak: Duffer Peak
- Elevation: 2,858 m (9,377 ft)

Geography
- Country: United States
- State: Nevada
- District: Humboldt County
- Range coordinates: 41°44′10.628″N 118°41′9.619″W
- Topo map: USGS Duffer Peak

The Pine Forest Range (also known as the Pine Forest Mountains) is a mountain range in Humboldt County, in the U.S. state of Nevada. It is north of the Black Rock Desert.

The range was so named on account of pine timber in the area.

== Gallery ==
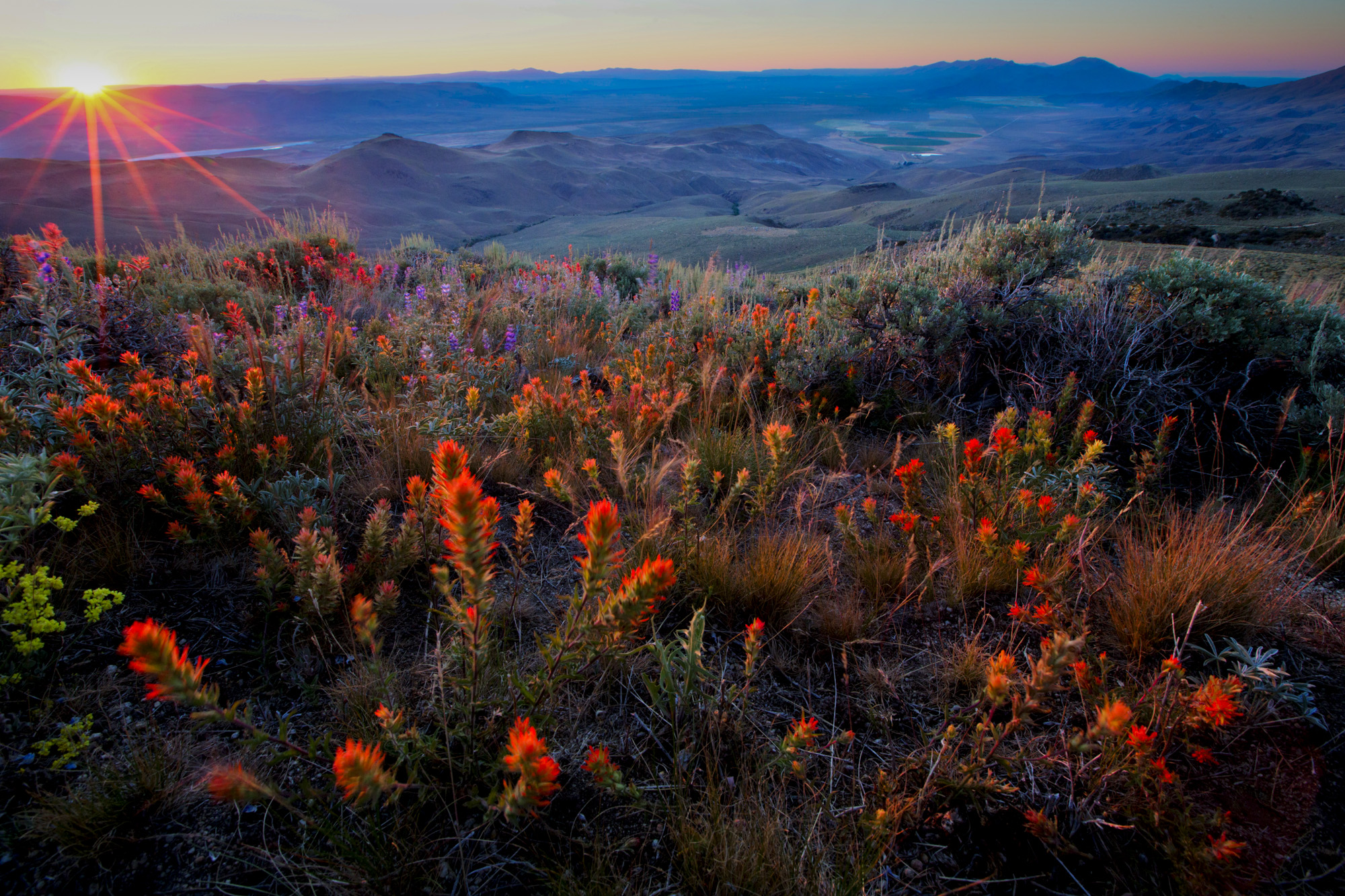

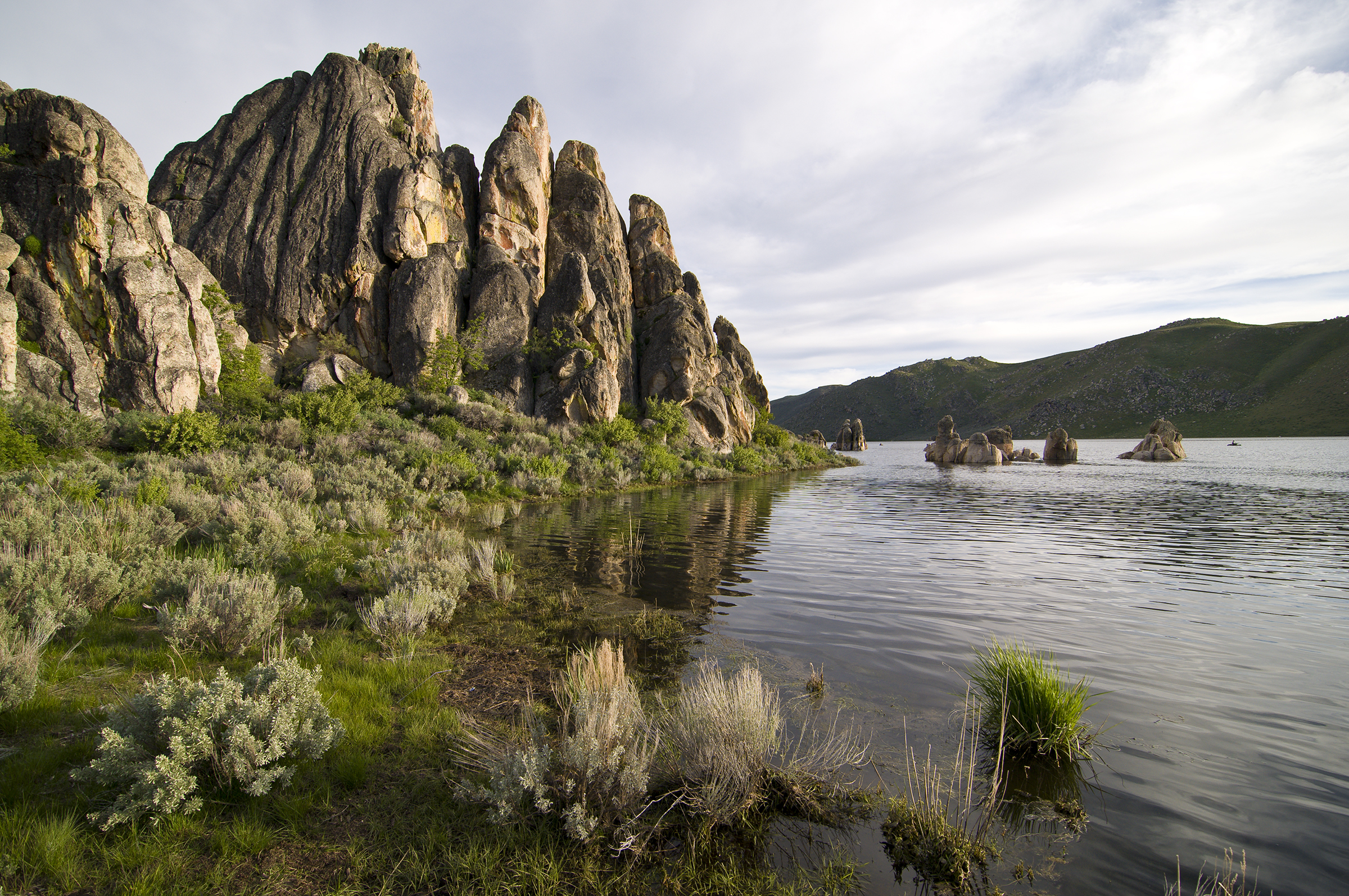

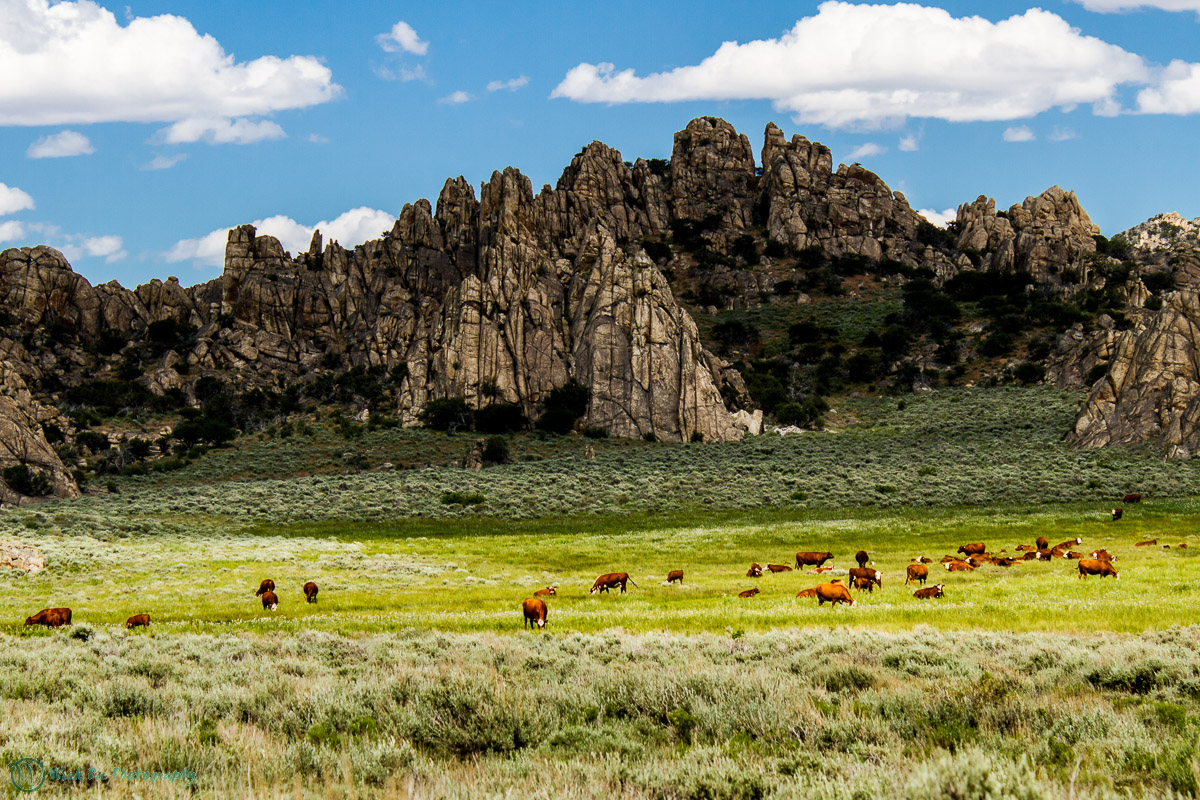

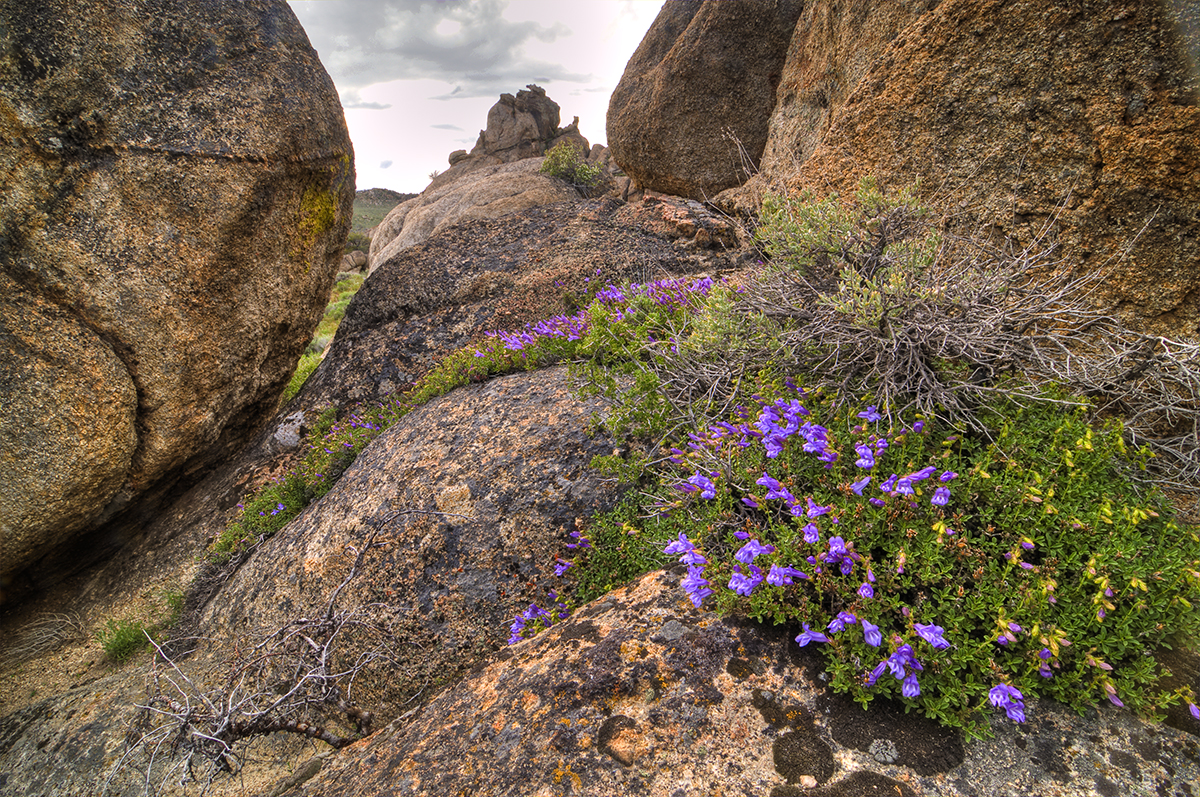

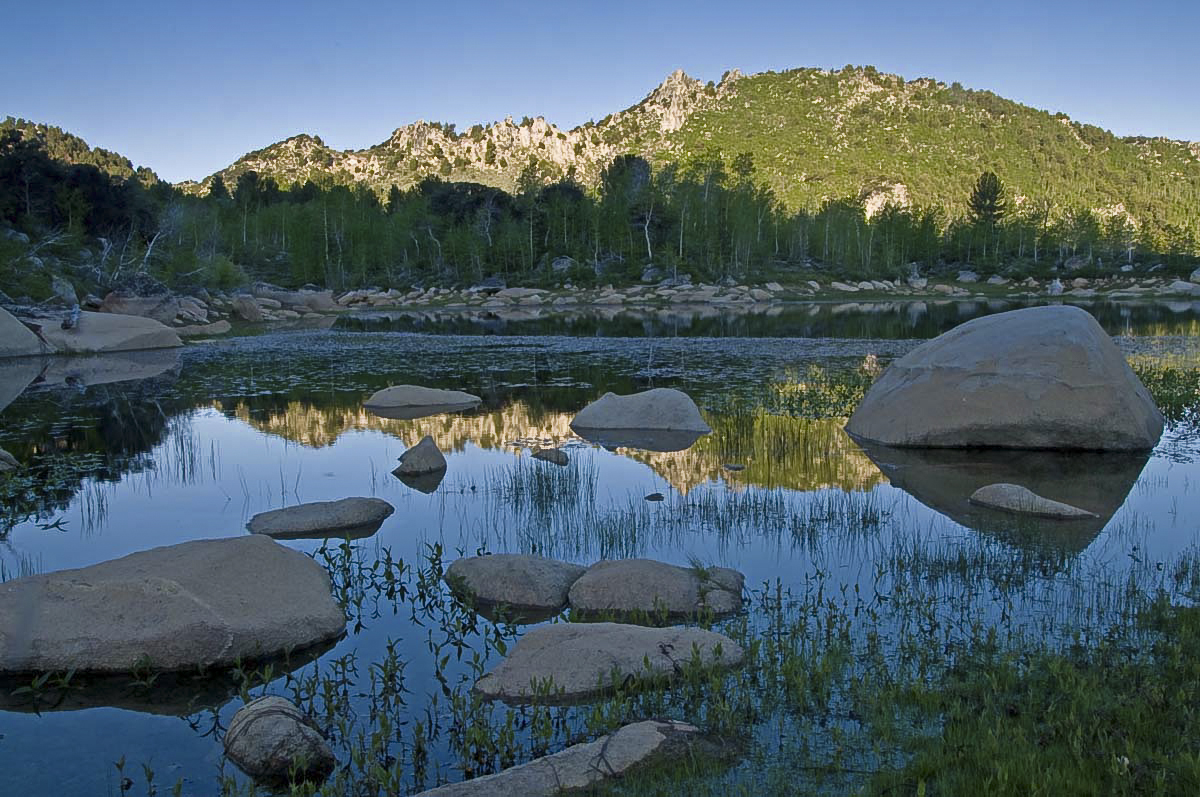
