= North Peak =

Mountain in Nevada, United States

Coordinates: 35°15′04″N 114°44′50″W

North Peak is a summit in the U.S. state of Nevada. The elevation is 4,911 feet (1,497 m).

North Peak was named for the fact it is north of other nearby mountains.
