= Eugene Mountains =

Mountain range in Nevada, United States

- Location within Nevada

Highest point
- Elevation: 2,075 m (6,808 ft)

Geography
- Country: United States
- State: Nevada
- District: Pershing County
- Range coordinates: 40°48′25.654″N 118°10′30.522″W
- Topo map: USGS Woody Canyon

The Eugene Mountains are a mountain range in Pershing County, Nevada.
