= Star Peak (Nevada) =

Mountain in Nevada, United States

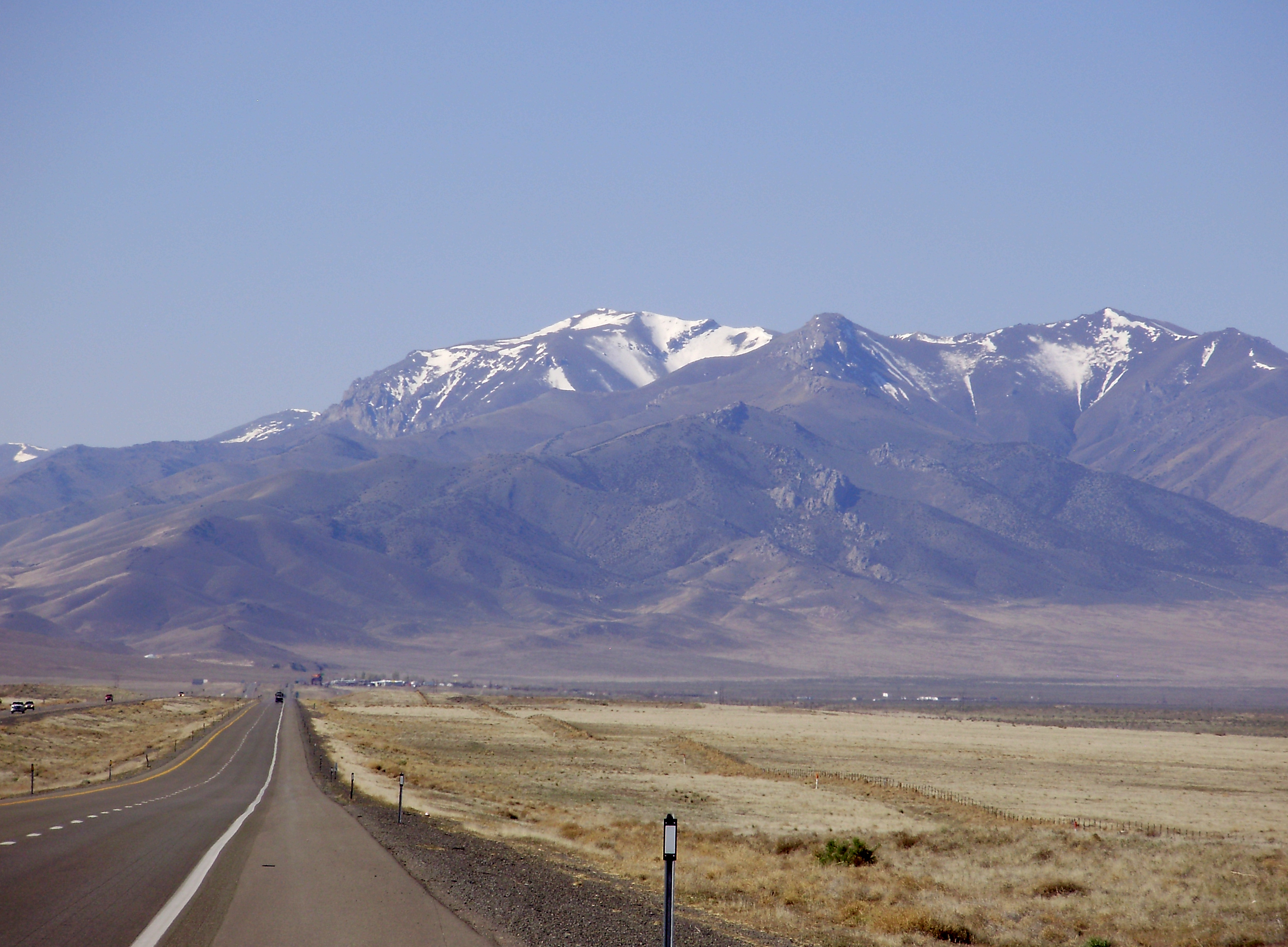
- View of Star Peak from Milepost 157 on Interstate 80

Highest point
- Elevation: 9,840 ft (2,999 m) NAVD 88
- Prominence: 5,400 ft (1,646 m)
- Listing: US most prominent peaks 95th; Nevada County High Points 13th; Great Basin Peaks List
- Coordinates: 40°31′21″N 118°10′15″W

Geography
- Location within Nevada
- Location: Pershing County, Nevada, U.S.
- Parent range: Humboldt Range
- Topo map: USGS Star Peak

Climbing
- Easiest route: 4-wheel route followed by a one mile hike, class 1

Star Peak is both the highest and most topographically prominent mountain in both the Humboldt Range and Pershing County in Nevada, United States. It is the sixth-most topographically prominent peak in Nevada. The peak is on public land administered by the Bureau of Land Management and has no access restrictions.

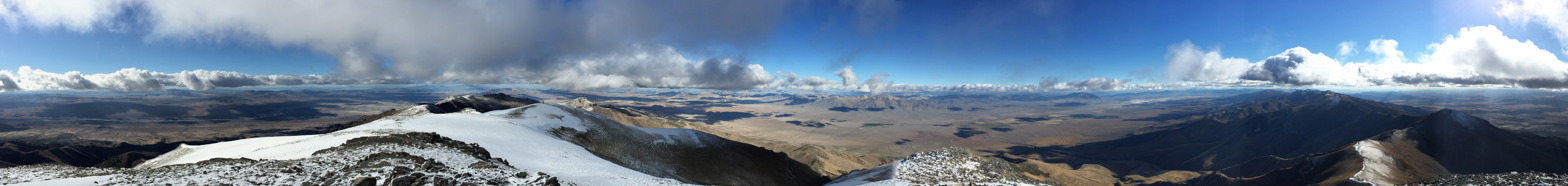
360-degree panorama from the summit

== See also ==
- List of Ultras of the United States
