= Piper Peak (Nevada) =

Mountain in the state of Nevada

- Location within Nevada

Highest point
- Elevation: 9,451 ft (2,881 m) NAVD 88
- Prominence: 4,083 ft (1,244 m)
- Coordinates: 37°42′15″N 117°54′32″W

Geography
- Location: Esmeralda County, Nevada, U.S.
- Parent range: Silver Peak Range
- Topo map: USGS PIPER PEAK

Piper Peak is the highest mountain in the Silver Peak Range of Esmeralda County in Nevada, United States. It is the most topographically prominent peak in Esmeralda County and ranks twenty-third among the most topographically prominent peaks in Nevada. The peak is on public land administered by the Bureau of Land Management and thus has no access restrictions.

The summit was named after N. T. Piper. Variant names are "Mount Piper" and "Pipers Peak".
