= Mount Tobin =

Mountain in the state of Nevada

- Location within Nevada

Highest point
- Elevation: 9,778 ft (2,980 m) NAVD 88
- Prominence: 4,831 ft (1,472 m)
- Coordinates: 40°22′35″N 117°31′34″W

Geography
- Location: Pershing County, Nevada, U.S.
- Parent range: Tobin Range
- Topo map: USGS MT TOBIN

Mount Tobin is the highest mountain in the Tobin Range of Pershing County in Nevada, United States. It is the second-most topographically prominent peak in Pershing County and ranks twelfth among the most topographically prominent peaks in Nevada. The peak is on public land administered by the Bureau of Land Management and thus has no access restrictions, though private property is located along the most popular route to the summit.
