= Mount Grafton =

Mountain in Nevada, United States

- Location within Nevada

Highest point
- Elevation: 10,997 ft (3,352 m) NAVD 88
- Prominence: 3,257 ft (993 m)
- Listing: Nevada County High Points 9th
- Coordinates: 38°41′32″N 114°44′33″W

Geography
- Location: White Pine County, Nevada, U.S.
- Parent range: Schell Creek Range
- Topo map: USGS Mount Grafton

Mount Grafton is the high point of the southern section of the Schell Creek Range in southern White Pine County, in eastern Nevada in the western United States. The summit is located 39 miles (63 km) south of the community of Ely. The south ridge crosses into Lincoln County, making it that county's highest point at 10,640 feet (3,240 m).
