= Cory Peak =

Mountain in the state of Nevada

Coordinates: 38.4482555°N 118.7823602°W

Cory Peak is a summit in the U.S. state of Nevada. The elevation is 10,502 feet (3,201 m).

Cory Peak was named after James Manning Cory (1830-1897), a businessperson in the mining industry. Variant names are "Corey Peak", "Corys Peak", "Mount Corey", "Mount Hull".
