= Virginia Peak (Nevada) =

Mountain in the American state of Nevada

- Location within Nevada

Highest point
- Elevation: 8,370 ft (2,551 m) NAVD 88
- Prominence: 3,642 ft (1,110 m)
- Coordinates: 39°45′20″N 119°27′41″W

Geography
- Location: Washoe County, Nevada, U.S.
- Parent range: Pah Rah Range
- Topo map: USGS PAH RAH MTN

Virginia Peak is the highest mountain in the Pah Rah Range of Washoe County in Nevada, United States. It is the most topographically prominent peak in Washoe County and ranks thirty-sixth among the most topographically prominent peaks in Nevada. The peak is on public land administered by the Bureau of Land Management and thus has no access restrictions. A National Weather Service NEXRAD doppler weather radar station is located on the summit.
