= Jumbo Peak =

Jumbo Peak may refer to:

- Jumbo Peak (Washington), Washington State, United States
- Jumbo Peak, in the Tararua Range, New Zealand

== See also ==
- Jumbo Mountain, Washington State, United States
- Jumbo Mountain (Canada), British Columbia
