= Tule Peak =

Mountain in Nevada, US

- Location within Nevada

Highest point
- Elevation: 8,726 ft (2,660 m)
- Prominence: 3,425 ft (1044 m)
- Coordinates: 39°58′34″N 119°44′39″W

Geography
- Location: Washoe County, Nevada, U.S.
- Parent range: Virginia Mountains

Tule Peak is a summit located in the northwest part of the US state of Nevada, within Washoe County. It is the highest peak in the Virginia Mountains with a height of 2659.7m.

== Flora and fauna ==
Tule Peak's 38,341 acres of land allow for a diverse natural habit. The western area of the summit is broad and rises gently, allowing for Great Basin sagebrush and grass to freely grow.

The hills terminate in very steep canyons and rugged walls, which eventually climb all the way up to the peaks of Virginia Range.

The highest elevations of the peak allow for dwarf sagebrush and grasslands communities to grow and be used as food for mule deer during the summer, as well as birds.

The northern part of the area has characteristics upland grasses and is considered good forage for cattle and even pronghorn antelope.

== Geography ==
Tule peak has an isolation of 51.7 km. From Tule peak, to the southwest the Pyramid Lake, which borders with Virginia Mountains can be seen. Other views are Tohakum Peak, as well as Kumiva Peak, and King Lear Peak. The north side is steeper, near the Pyramid Lake side, with almost 5,000 feet of vertical gain, whereas the south side the peak has 3,700 feet of vertical gain.

The closest city is Reno, which is often used as a starting point by enthusiasts who hike toward the Tule Peak.
