= Virgin Peak =

Mountain in Nevada, United States

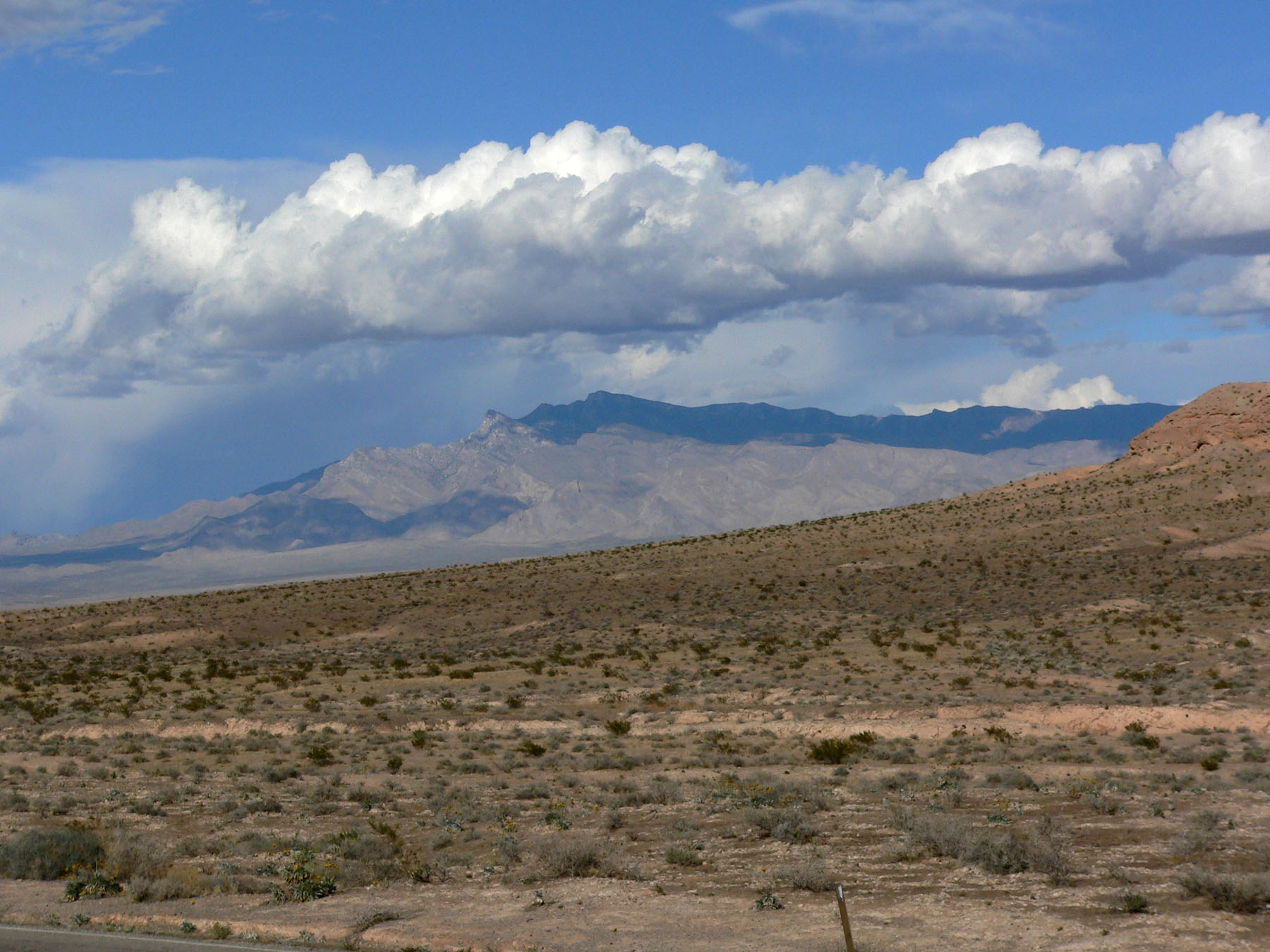
- Photo of Virgin Mountains Range

Highest point
- Elevation: 8,074 ft (2,461 m)
- Prominence: 3,182 ft (970 m)
- Coordinates: 36°36′11″N 114°06′40″W

Geography
- Location within Nevada
- Location: Clark County, Nevada, U.S.
- Parent range: Virgin Mountains

Climbing
- Easiest route: Hike along the South Ridge

Virgin Peak is the highest point of Virgin Mountain range, located northeast of Lake Mead, in the state of Clark County, Nevada, United States. The peak has an elevation of 8,074 feet (2,461 m) and a prominence of 3,182 ft (970 m). The peak is part of the Gold Butte National Monument, northeast of Las Vegas.

== Geography ==
The peak is located nine miles from the city of Mesquite. The terrain around the peak is very rugged and rocky, thus few hikers visit. Many red rock formations can be viewed while exploring the peak.

The south ridge is the preferred route hikers choose.

The mountain's ridge is mostly formed out of carbonate rock. The east facing slopes are shady and tall conifer trees like Yellow Pine can be seen.
