= Mount Siegel =

Mountain in the state of Nevada

- Location within Nevada

Highest point
- Elevation: 9,456 ft (2,882 m) NAVD 88
- Prominence: 3,477 ft (1,060 m)
- Coordinates: 38°53′22″N 119°30′08″W

Geography
- Location: Douglas County, Nevada, U.S.
- Parent range: Pine Nut Mountains
- Topo map: USGS MT SIEGEL

Mount Siegel, elevation 9456 ft., is the highest mountain in the Pine Nut Mountains of Douglas County in Nevada, United States. It is the most topographically prominent peak in Douglas County and ranks forty-sixth among the most topographically prominent peaks in Nevada. The peak is on public land administered by the Bureau of Land Management and thus has no access restrictions.
