= Shoshone Mountain =

Mountain range in Nevada, United States

- Location within Nevada

Highest point
- Elevation: 2,083 m (6,834 ft)

Geography
- Country: United States
- State: Nevada
- District: Nye County
- Range coordinates: 36°55′30.827″N 116°13′10.154″W
- Topo map: USGS Mine Mountain

Shoshone Mountain is a mountain range in Nye County, Nevada.
