= Pine Nut Mountains =

Mountain range in Nevada, United States

Coordinates: 39°03′44″N 119°32′59″W

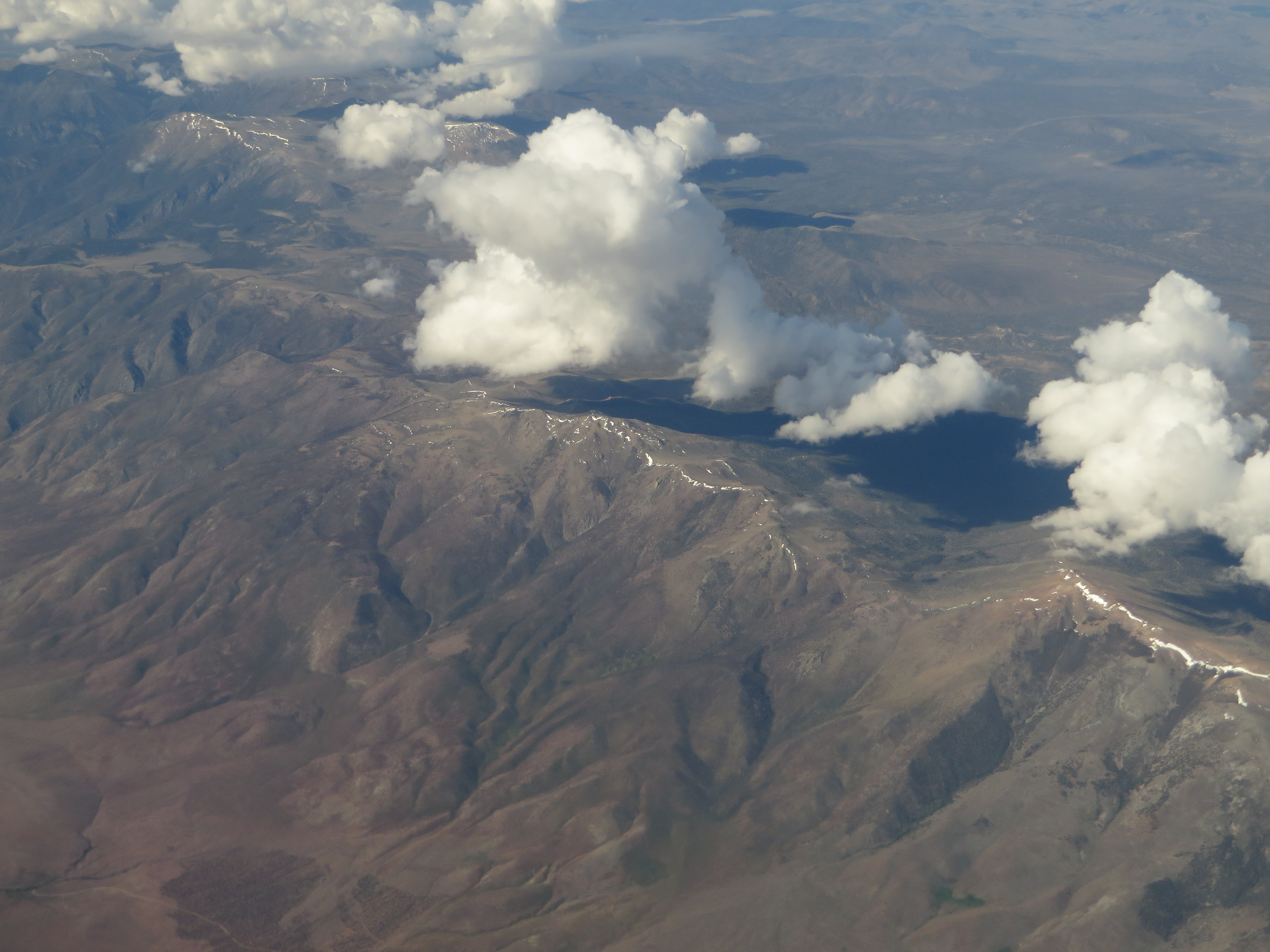
2015 aerial photo of the Pine Nut Mountains

The Pine Nut Mountains are a north–south mountain range in the Great Basin, in Douglas and Lyon counties of northwestern Nevada, United States. The highest mountain in the range is Mount Siegel at 9,456 ft (2,882 m).

== Geography ==
Pine Nut Mountains with snow-capped Carson Range

The range starts in the north at the Virginia Range (famous for Virginia City and the Comstock Lode). They continue south for approximately 40 miles where they join with the Sierra Nevada near Topaz Lake and Leviathan Peak. They are bounded on the west by the Carson Valley and to the east by Mason Valley.

== Flora ==
The Pine Nut Mountains take their name from the single-leaf pinyon pines that dominate the slopes between 5000 and 7000 ft. This is mixed with juniper to form the standard pinyon–juniper woodland plant community. Lower slopes are dominated by sage–juniper.

== Cultural ==
The Pine Nut Mountains have been used throughout history by a number of groups for various purposes. The Washoe tribe used (and still uses) the vast quantities of Pinyon pine for the nuts as a staple in their diet. The nuts were collected, roasted, and cached during the fall for use during the lean months of winter. After the discovery of silver and gold in the area, the Pine Nut Mountains became a key source of timber for the building boom and charcoal for the smelters, thus depleting many of the traditional Washoe collection areas. Today, the range is still used by the Washoe for traditional purposes as well as by hikers, hunters, and other outdoor enthusiasts.
