= Silver Peak Range =

Mountain range in Nevada, United States

- Location within Nevada

Highest point
- Peak: Piper Peak
- Elevation: 2,880 m (9,450 ft)

Geography
- Country: United States
- State: Nevada
- District: Esmeralda County
- Range coordinates: 37°39′11.750″N 117°50′40.347″W
- Topo map: USGS Mohawk Mine

The Silver Peak Range is a mountain range in southwest Esmeralda County, Nevada, United States.

== Geography ==
The range forms the east and southeast side of Fish Lake Valley. The towering White Mountains lie across the valley to the west and southwest. The Palmetto Mountains are to the south.

Piper Peak, Red Mountain, and Emigrant Peak are in the range.
