= Osgood Mountains =

Mountain range in Nevada, United States

- Location within Nevada

Highest point
- Elevation: 2,401 m (7,877 ft)

Geography
- Country: United States
- State: Nevada
- District: Humboldt County
- Range coordinates: 41°7′4.646″N 117°21′2.428″W
- Topo map: USGS Red House Flat West

The Osgood Mountains are a mountain range in Humboldt County, Nevada.

The Osgood Mountains climb to 7,877 feet (2,401 meters) above sea level, and are located at latitude - longitude coordinates (also called lat - long coordinates or GPS coordinates) of N 41.117957 and W -117.350675.
