= Morey Peak =

Mountain in Nevada, United States

- Location within Nevada

Highest point
- Elevation: 10,246 ft (3,123 m)
- Prominence: 166 ft
- Coordinates: 38°37′39″N 116°17′17″W

Geography
- Location: Nevada, United States
- Parent range: Hot Creek Range

Morey Peak is a mountain summit with an elevation of 3123 meters (10246 ft), with a prominence of 51 meters. It is located in the Hot Creek Range in the state of Nevada, United States.

== Geography ==
The past volcanic activity in the area has formed many steep and cliffs and gullies across the summit.

The mountains near Morey Peak are composed out of quartz latite and rhyolite intrusives. Most of which come from the Oligocene epoch, estimated to be between 25 - 30 million years ago.

=== Flora and fauna ===
Most flowers in Hot Creek Range around Morey Peak can typically be found in wetter areas like near streams. Such are Irises, Lupines, Wild roses, primroses, scarlet columbines, palmer penstemons, purple penstemons, red penstemons, and lavender.

A lot of feral horses, elk and jackrabbits find refuge in the mountain, as well as eagles.
