= Desatoya Peak =

Mountain in Nevada, United States

Desatoya Peak (South)
- Location within Nevada

Highest point
- Elevation: 9,977 ft (3,041 m) NAVD 88
- Prominence: 3,545 ft (1,081 m)
- Listing: Nevada County High Points 12th
- Coordinates: 39°21′55″N 117°45′33″W

Geography
- Location: Churchill / Lander, counties, Nevada, U.S.
- Parent range: Desatoya Mountains
- Topo map: USGS Desatoya Peak

Desatoya Peak is the tallest mountain in both the Desatoya Mountains and Churchill County, in Nevada, United States. It ranks forty-third among the most topographically prominent peaks in the state. The mountain has two peaks with the south peak being the taller at 9,977 feet (3,041 m) while the north peak has an elevation of 9,970 feet (3,039 m). It is located about 38 miles (61 km) west of Austin and 55 miles (89 km) east of Fallon, along the boundary between Churchill County and Lander County. The peak is on public land administered by the Bureau of Land Management and thus has no access restrictions.

== Conservation ==
The 51,402 acres (20,802 ha) surrounding Desatoya Peak are part of the Desatoya Mountains Wilderness Study Area which is administered by the Bureau of Land Management. Wildlife that make their home here are mountain lion, mule deer, gray fox, sage grouse, red-tailed hawk, golden eagle and pika. Additionally, brook trout and Humboldt cutthroat trout live in some of the permanent streams on the flanks of Desatoya Peak.
