= Highland Peak (Nevada) =

Summit in Nevada, US

Coordinates: 37°53′38″N 114°34′45″W

Highland Peak is a summit in the U.S. state of Nevada. The elevation is 9,337 feet (2,846 m).

Highland Peak was named after the Scottish Highlands, the ancestral home of a pioneer citizen.
