= Sonoma Range =

Mountain range in Nevada, United States

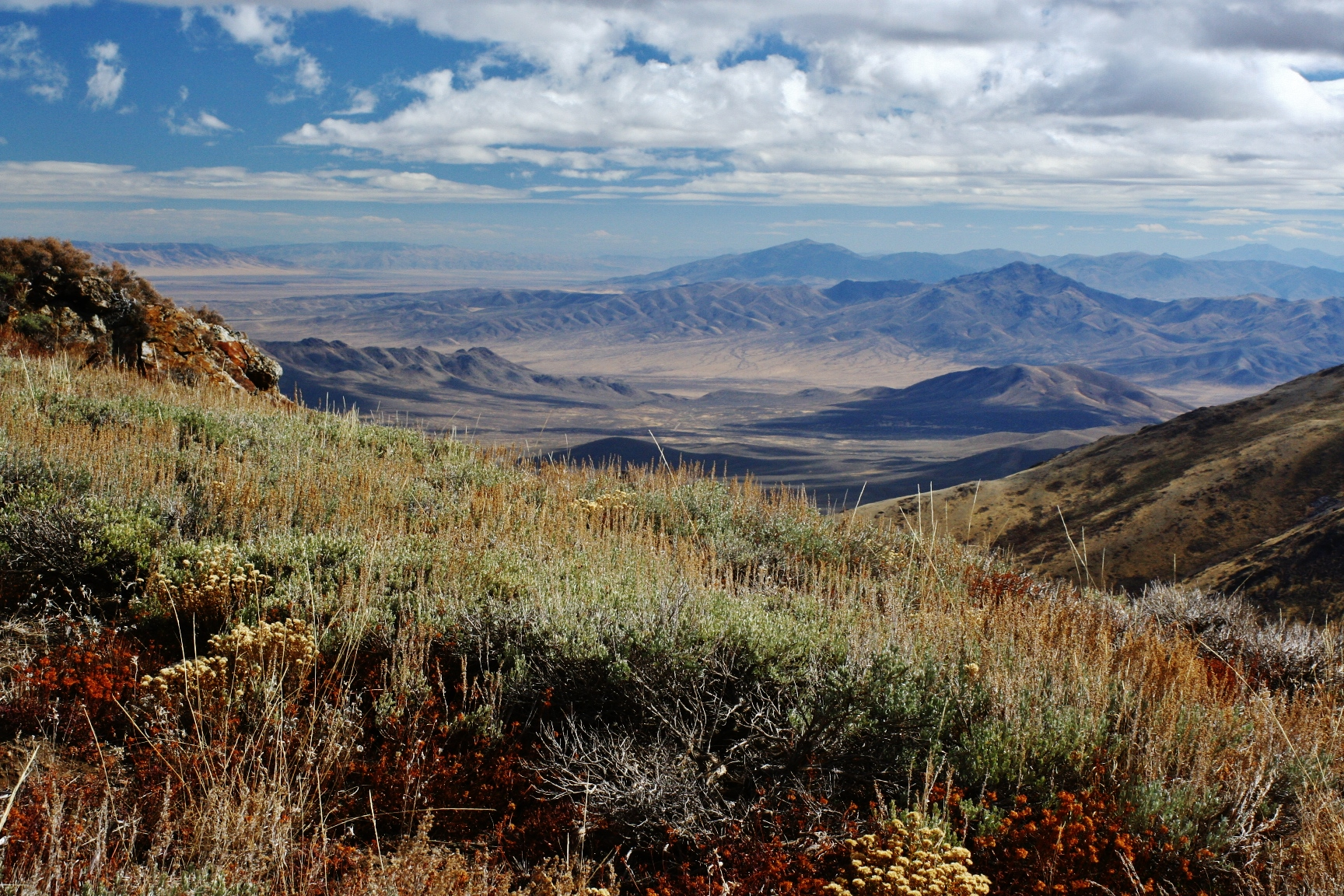
Looking north from the crest of the Sonoma Range

The Sonoma Range is a small mountain range in northwest Nevada, USA. It lies just south of the Humboldt River between Winnemucca and Golconda. It is one of the many ranges of the basin and range geologic province of the Great Basin. Sonoma Peak is the highest mountain in the range at (9,396 feet or 2,864 metres). Its summit is located at 40°51′36″N 117°36′30″W.

The range's name is a transfer from Sonoma County in California.
