= Stillwater Range =

Mountain range in Nevada, United States

- Location within Nevada

Highest point
- Peak: Job Peak
- Elevation: 8,727 ft (2,660 m)
- Coordinates: 39°35′00″N 118°14′07″W

Geography
- Country: United States
- State: Nevada
- Counties: Churchill; Pershing
- Range coordinates: 39°51′24″N 118°06′21″W
- Parent range: Basin and Range
- Borders on: East Range; Sand Springs Range

The Stillwater Range is a mountain range located in western Nevada in the United States. It is a SSW–NNE running ridge, approximately 70 miles (110 km) long. It cuts across the center of Churchill County and extends partway into Pershing County.

The Stillwater Range separates the Carson Sink (to the west) from Dixie Valley (to the east). To the north, a low pass separates it from the East Range. To the south, the Sand Springs Pass separates it from the Sand Springs Range. Nestled against the south end of the range is Sand Mountain, an enormous 600-foot (180 m) tall sand dune which draws off-road vehicle enthusiasts from across Nevada and California.

A series of earthquakes measuring 6.6–7.1 on the Richter Scale, centered beneath or near the Stillwater Range, occurred between July and December 1954. As the area was then (and still is) sparsely populated, no fatalities and little property damage resulted. Extensive surface rupturing can be seen on the east slope of the range.

Several small mines can be found in the cliffsides of the mountains, many of which may not be marked on maps. Water running off the mountains is sometimes used to irrigate alfalfa fields. A notable point is the Steam Tractor Trail that begins of the eastern side. At the top of the trail is a steam tractor that was left there when the road was originally made.

The principal peaks of the Stillwater Range include Table Mountain (8,330 feet (2,540 m)), Mount Lincoln (8,450 feet (2,580 m)) and Job Peak (8,727 feet (2,660 m)).
