= Mount Augusta (Nevada) =

Mountain in the state of Nevada

- Location within Nevada

Highest point
- Elevation: 9,970 ft (3,039 m) NAVD 88
- Prominence: 4,366 ft (1,331 m)
- Coordinates: 39°32′24″N 117°55′11″W

Geography
- Location: Churchill County, Nevada, U.S.
- Parent range: Clan Alpine Mountains
- Topo map: USGS MT AUGUSTA

Mount Augusta is the highest mountain in the Clan Alpine Mountains of Churchill County in Nevada, United States. It is the most topographically prominent peak in Churchill County and ranks nineteenth among the most topographically prominent peaks in Nevada. The peak is on public land administered by the Bureau of Land Management and thus has no access restrictions.
