= Virginia Mountains =

Mountain range in Nevada, United States

- Location within Nevada

Highest point
- Peak: Tule Peak
- Elevation: 2,659 m (8,724 ft)

Geography
- Country: United States
- State: Nevada
- District: Washoe County
- Range coordinates: 39°58.6′N 119°44.7′W
- Topo map(s): USGS Tule Peak and Pyramid SW; 7.5 minute quads

The Virginia Mountains is an irregular mountain range entirely in Washoe County, Nevada, that generally extends north-northwest to south-southeast for 22 miles (35 km).

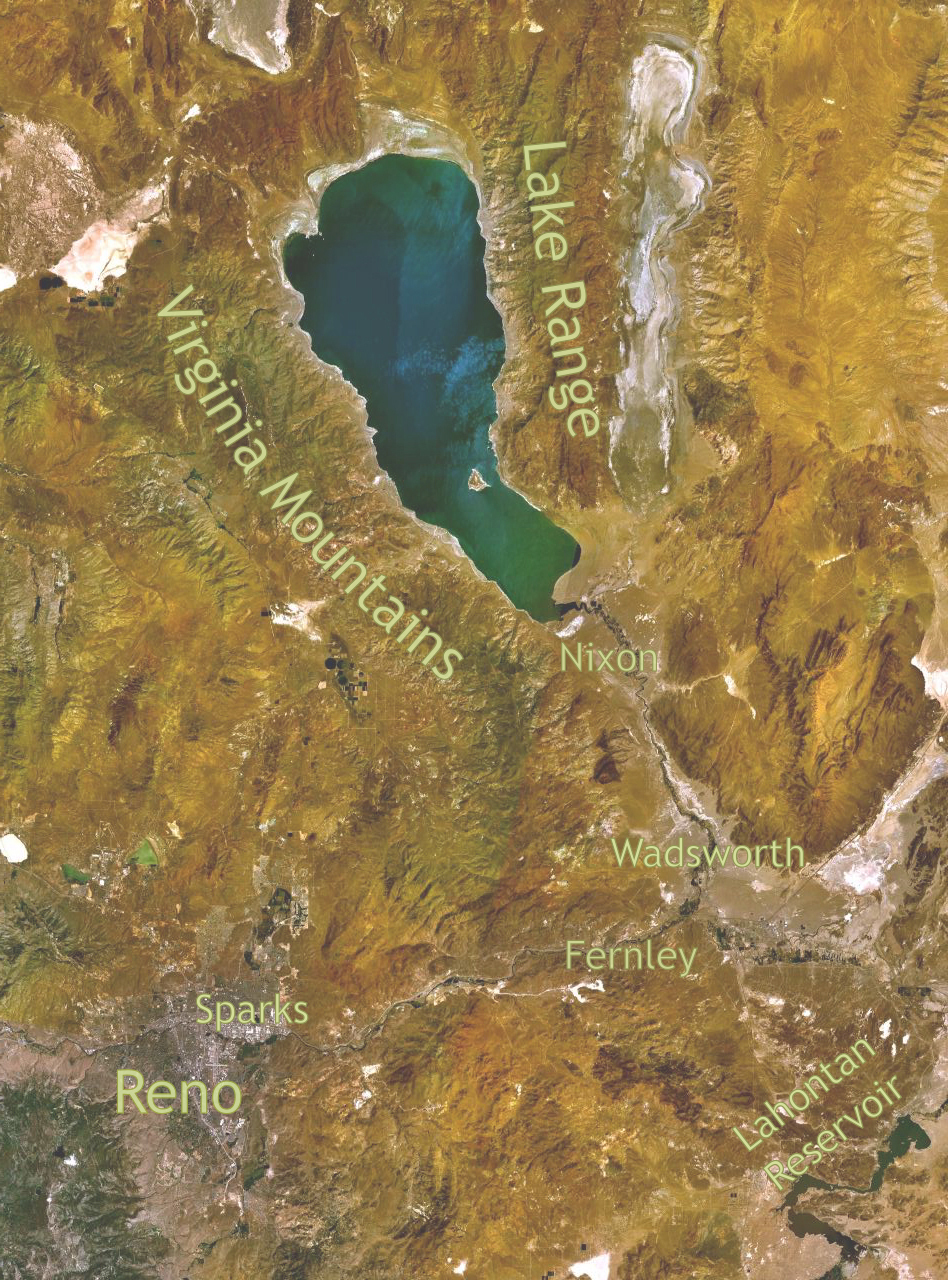
NASA Landsat view of the Virginia Mountains and surrounding area

The range is bordered by Astor Pass and Terraced Hills to the north, Pyramid Lake to the east, Mullen Pass and the Pah Rah Range to the south and Honey Lake Valley, Winnemucca Valley and Dogskin Mountain on the west. The eastern portion along Pyramid Lake is within the Pyramid Lake Indian Reservation.

The highest summit is Tule Peak 8,724 feet (2,659 m) and notable features include Needle Rock, the "Monkey Condos", the Painted Hills, and Mahogany Flat (7,800 ft (2,400 m)) near the center of the range.

The town of Sutcliffe lies on shore of Pyramid Lake adjacent to the range. Nevada State Route 445 runs along the east side of the range along the shore of Pyramid Lake and continues to southwest through Mullen Pass between the Virginia Mountains and the Pah Rah Range to the southeast.

== Structure ==
“The Virginia Mountains of Washoe County, Nevada, is an uplifted and collapsed anticlinal structure having a N-S trend but bending toward the southeast at the southern end of the range. NW and NNW fault trends in Winnemucca Valley and within the low hills on the eastern range front are believed to be a part of the Walker Lane lineament. Topographic, structural, and geologic evidence yields confidently a first-order, right-lateral, strike-slip fault interpretation. Also indicated are second-order left-lateral, strike slip movements along the eastern mountain front. The structurally very complex southern one-fifth of the range together with the northern portion of the Pah Rah Range suggest distributive branching of the Walker Lane lineament in the brittle Hartford Hill rhyolite as the lineament nears termination in southern Washoe County. The present topography of the Virginia Mountains is the result of bending of layers of volcanic rocks, high- angle and strike-slip faulting, and erosion in an arid to semi-arid climate. Major and minor drainage is controlled almost exclusively by the structure. Fault valleys are characteristic of the entire range and are the principal topographic forms, but many other types of drainage are present. The higher elevations are representative of old erosion surfaces.”
