= Pah Rah Range =

Mountain range in Nevada, United States

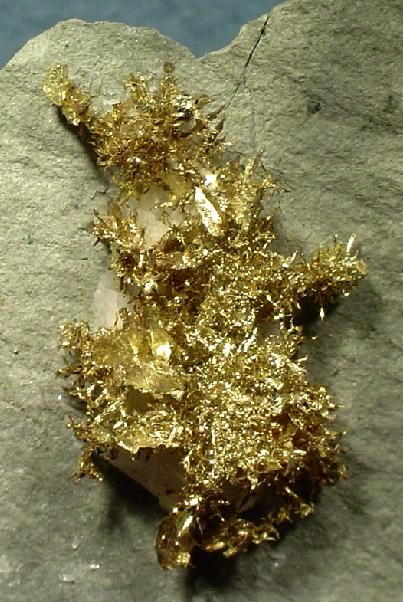
- Gold from Olinghouse district

Highest point
- Peak: Virginia Peak
- Elevation: 2,547 m (8,356 ft)

Geography
- Location within Nevada
- Country: United States
- State: Nevada
- District: Washoe County
- Range coordinates: 39°45.3′N 119°27.7′W
- Topo map(s): USGS Nixon, Wadsworth and Spanish Springs Valley; 15 minute quads

The Pah Rah Range is a mountain range located in western Nevada in Washoe County just to the northeast of Reno. It is a hook shaped range with the main eastern portion oriented northwest–southeast, approximately 20 miles (32 km) long. The northwest flowing Cottonwood Creek in Warm Springs Valley is bounded on three sides by the range. To the south and east the Truckee River forms the boundary and Pyramid Lake is at the northeast. Spanish Springs Valley north of Reno forms the southwest margin. To the north, the narrow Mullen Pass separates the Pah Rah Range from the Virginia Mountains.

The highest peaks (in order from south to north) are Pond Peak (elevation 8,035 ft (2,449 m)), Virginia Peak (elevation 8,357 ft (2,547 m)) and Pah Rah Peak (elevation 8,249 ft (2,514 m)). In the southwest portion Spanish Springs Peak (elevation 7,404 ft (2,257 m)) is the highest. Both Pond Peak and Virginia Peak host several radio towers. Virginia Peak is also the site of a doppler radar station.

Interstate 80 follows the Truckee River basin to the south of the range. Nevada State Route 445 follows the Spanish Springs Valley to the west of the range, Nevada State Route 446 crosses through Mullen Pass to the north and Nevada State Route 447 follows the lakeshore and the Truckee Valley on the east side of the range.

The Pyramid Lake Indian Reservation occupies the eastern portion of the range.

"Pah Rah" is a Paiute term which translates roughly to "Lake Mountain" in reference to Pyramid Lake adjacent to the northeast margin of the range. This term applies to the Virginia Mountains better. This apparent mix-up is likely due to confusion on the part of the early surveyors of the region.

== Olinghouse mining district ==
The former community and historic mining district of Olinghouse is located in the southeastern foothills of the Pah Rah Range about 8 miles (13 km) WNW of Wadsworth, Nevada and 2 miles (3.2 km) east of Pond Peak. The mines of the district produced gold from placer deposits and veins associated with granite porphyry dikes in a faulted basaltic to andesitic volcanic terrain of Oligocene to Miocene age. Mining for gold as collector's specimens occurred during the late 1990s and early 2000s.

The area had four names: White Horse, McLanesville, Ora and finally Olinghouse. The district and the former town that served it were named for Elias Olinghouse, who settled there and ran a mule team transport service.

The Olinghouse post office was in operation from October 1903 until July 1923.

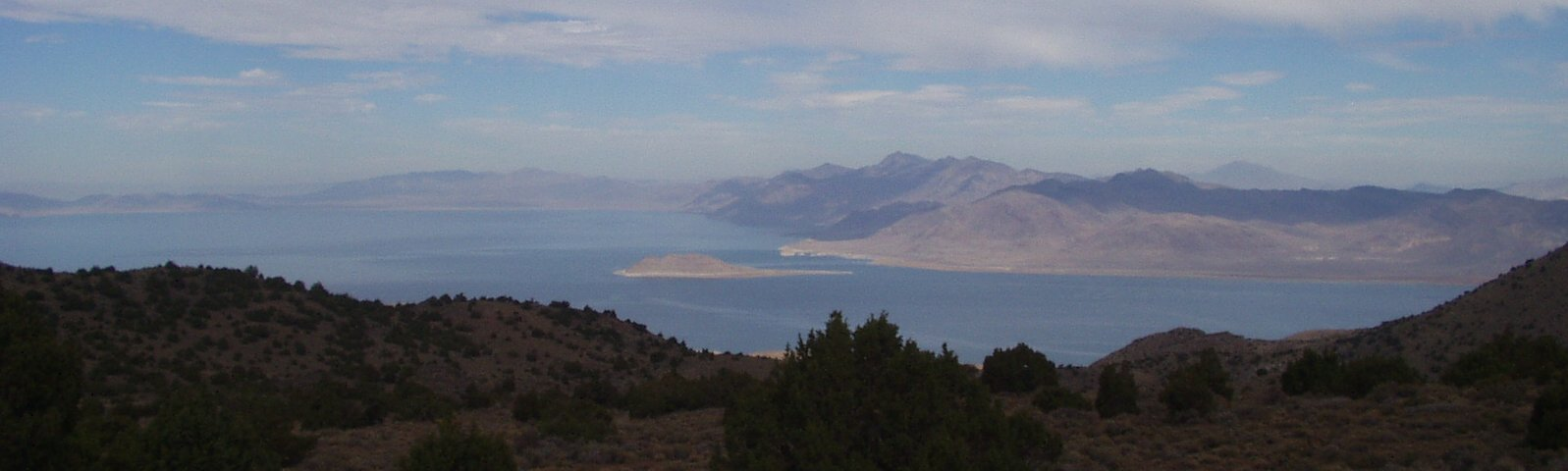
Pyramid Lake viewed from Pah Rah

== Fauna of Pah Rah Range ==
Wildlife of the range include pronghorn antelopes, bighorn sheep, coyotes, mountain lions and feral horses. The bighorn was seen wandering in the foothills of the range in Sparks(Wingfield Springs). It is thought to be from a group of bighorns transplanted to the nearby Virginia Range. Bird species include golden eagles, prairie falcons and red-tailed hawks.

== See also ==
- List of mountain ranges of Nevada
