= Job Peak =

Mountain in the state of Nevada

Coordinates: 39°35′00″N 118°14′07″W

Job Peak is a summit in the U.S. state of Nevada. The elevation is 8,727 feet (2,660 m).

Job Peak was named after Moses Job, proprietor of a local toll road.
