= Kingston, Nevada =

Unincorporated community in Lander County, Nevada, United States

- Census-designated place
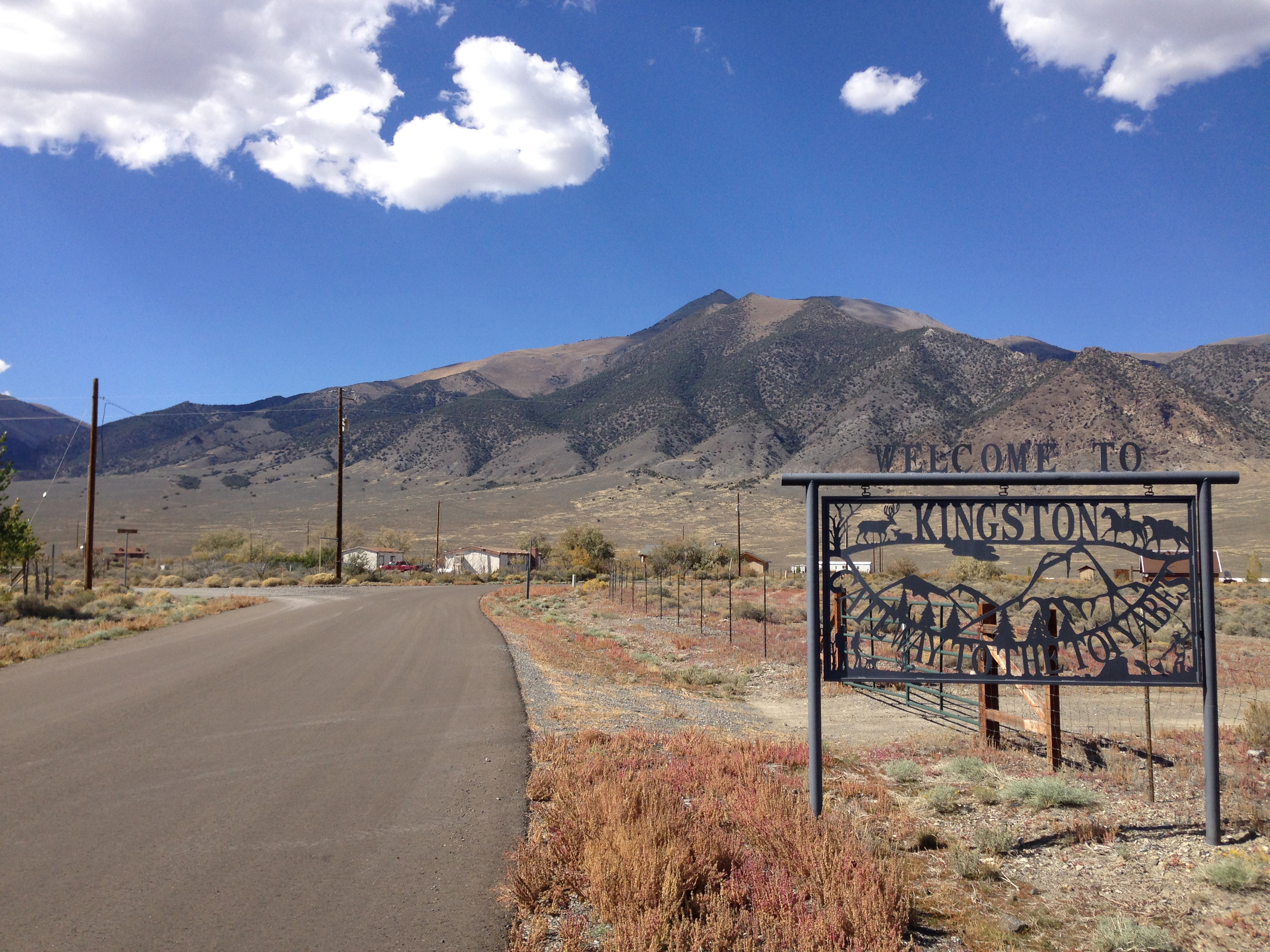
- Entrance to Kingston from Nevada State Route 376. Bunker Hill is visible in the background.

- Location of Kingston, Nevada
- Coordinates: 39°12′36″N 117°04′05″W
- Country: United States
- State: Nevada

Area
  - Total: 4.07 sq mi (10.54 km^{2})
  - Land: 4.07 sq mi (10.54 km^{2})
  - Water: 0 sq mi (0.00 km^{2})
- Elevation: 5,955 ft (1,815 m)

Population (2020)
  - Total: 194
  - Density: 47.7/sq mi (18.41/km^{2})
- Time zone: UTC-8 (Pacific (PST))
  - Summer (DST): UTC-7 (PDT)
- ZIP code: 89310
- Area code: 775
- FIPS code: 32-38100
- GNIS feature ID: 2583936

Kingston is a census-designated place in Lander County, Nevada, United States. As of the 2020 census, the population was 194.

== Geography ==
Kingston is located along Nevada State Route 376 in Lander County and the southern border with Nye County. It sits on the western edge of the Big Smoky Valley with the Toiaybe Range is to its west and the Toquima Range across the Big Smoky Valley to its east. Bunker Hill, the highest peak in Lander County, is located just a few miles to its northwest.

Austin, the seat of Lander County, is 20 miles (32 km) to its north and Tonopah in nearby Nye County is 90 miles (140 km) to its southwest.

Kingston has an area of 4.1 square miles (10.5 km^{2}), all of which is land.

== Demographics ==
Historical population
Census	Pop.	Note	%±
2010	113		—
2020	194		71.7%
U.S. Decennial Census

== See also ==
- Kingston Airport (Nevada)
- Round Mountain, Nevada
- Carvers, Nevada
- Hadley, Nevada
