= Mount Jefferson (Nevada) =

Mountain in Nevada, United States

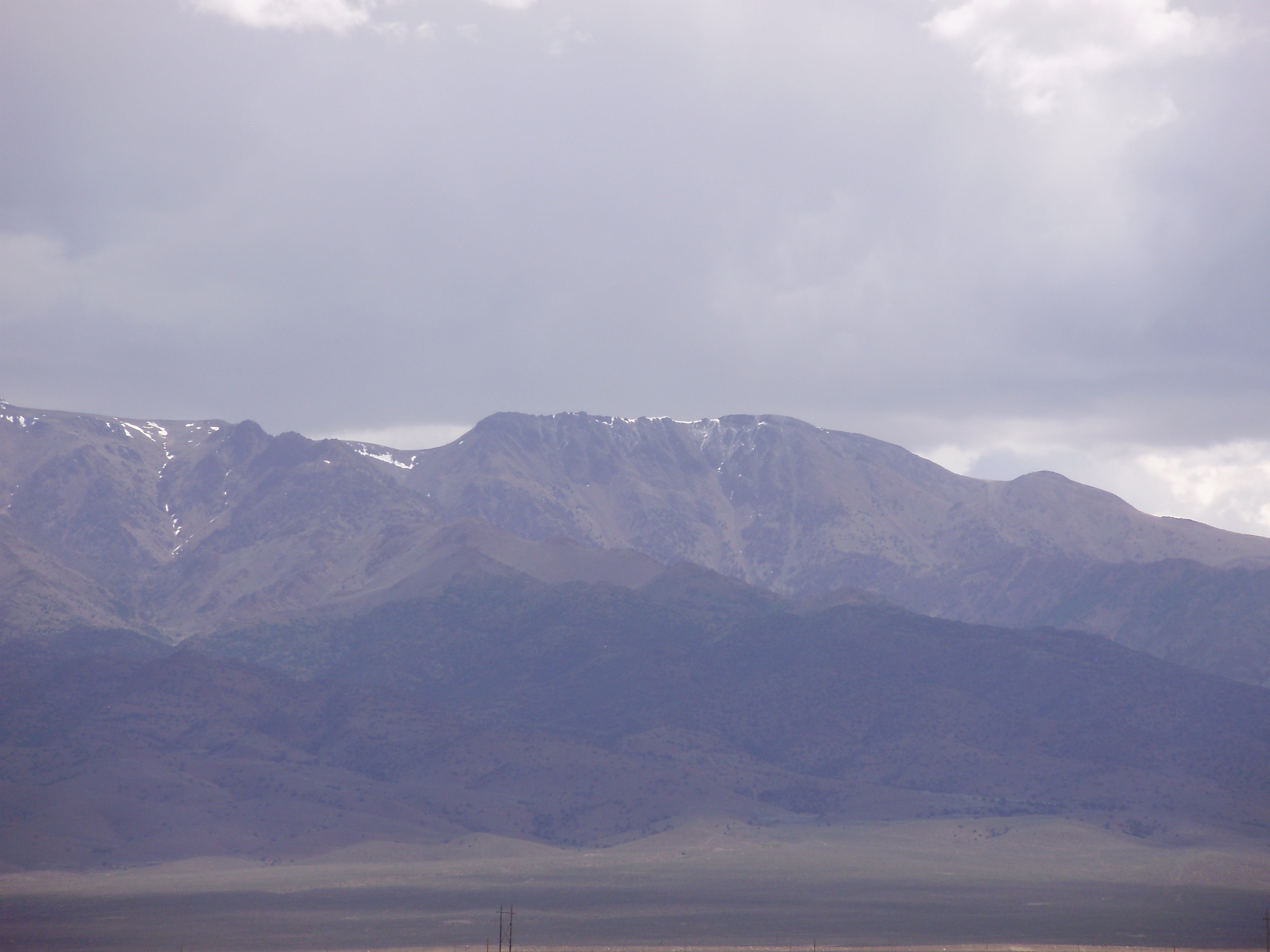
- View of the South Summit of Mt. Jefferson from SR 376 near Round Mountain

Highest point
- Elevation: 11,946 ft (3,641 m) NAVD 88
- Prominence: 5,861 ft (1,786 m)
- Listing: US most prominent peaks 71st; Nevada County High Points 3rd
- Coordinates: 38°45′07″N 116°55′36″W

Geography
- Location within Nevada
- Location: Nye County, Nevada, U.S.
- Parent range: Toquima Range
- Topo map: USGS Mount Jefferson

Climbing
- Easiest route: From Jefferson Summit near Meadow Canyon, a four-wheel drive road leads north to a trail which ascends directly to the Mount Jefferson South Summit, Hide class 1

Mount Jefferson is the highest mountain in both the Toquima Range and Nye County in Nevada, United States. It is the sixth highest mountain in the state. As the high point of a range which is well separated from other ranges by low basins, Mount Jefferson has a high topographic prominence of 5,861 feet (1,786 m). This makes it the most prominent peak in Nye County and the third most prominent peak in Nevada (after Charleston Peak and Wheeler Peak). For similar reasons, it is also the highest mountain for over 90 miles in all directions. It is located about 50 miles (80 km) northeast of the county seat of Tonopah within the Alta Toquima Wilderness of the Humboldt-Toiyabe National Forest, near the smaller towns of Carvers and Round Mountain. Three distinct summits are located on a broad area of subalpine tundra: North Summit rises to 11,820 feet (3,603 m), Middle Summit to 11,692 feet (3,564 m), and South Summit to 11,949 feet (3,642 m). During the Pleistocene, alpine glaciers eroded several cirques east of the summit plateau.

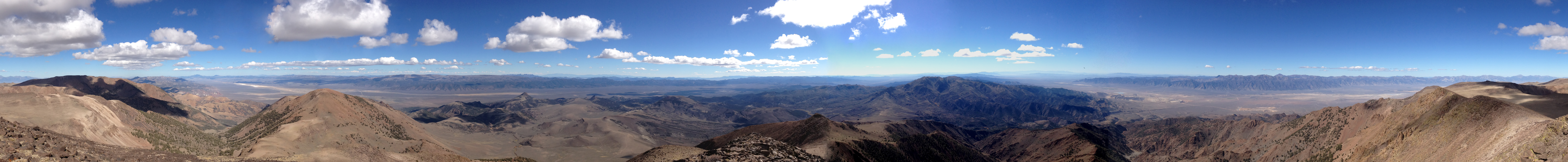
360-degree panorama from Mount Jefferson's South Summit

== Climate ==
Climate data for Mt Jefferson (South Summit) 38.7495 N, 116.9272 W, Elevation: 11,568 ft (3,526 m) (1991–2020 normals)
Month	Jan	Feb	Mar	Apr	May	Jun	Jul	Aug	Sep	Oct	Nov	Dec	Year
Mean daily maximum °F (°C)	29.4 (−1.4)	28.6 (−1.9)	32.7 (0.4)	35.0 (1.7)	43.8 (6.6)	54.8 (12.7)	63.7 (17.6)	62.7 (17.1)	55.7 (13.2)	45.3 (7.4)	35.6 (2.0)	29.3 (−1.5)	43.1 (6.2)
Daily mean °F (°C)	20.3 (−6.5)	18.9 (−7.3)	22.3 (−5.4)	25.0 (−3.9)	33.3 (0.7)	43.3 (6.3)	51.5 (10.8)	50.5 (10.3)	44.0 (6.7)	34.8 (1.6)	26.2 (−3.2)	20.2 (−6.6)	32.5 (0.3)
Mean daily minimum °F (°C)	11.2 (−11.6)	9.2 (−12.7)	12.0 (−11.1)	14.9 (−9.5)	22.9 (−5.1)	31.9 (−0.1)	39.3 (4.1)	38.4 (3.6)	32.2 (0.1)	24.4 (−4.2)	16.8 (−8.4)	11.1 (−11.6)	22.0 (−5.5)
Average precipitation inches (mm)	2.59 (66)	2.40 (61)	2.90 (74)	2.71 (69)	2.55 (65)	1.82 (46)	1.85 (47)	1.33 (34)	1.56 (40)	1.84 (47)	2.00 (51)	2.30 (58)	25.85 (658)
Source: PRISM Climate Group

== See also ==
- List of Ultras of the United States
