= Toquima Range =

Mountain range in Nevada, United States

Coordinates: 38°56′27″N 116°50′09″W

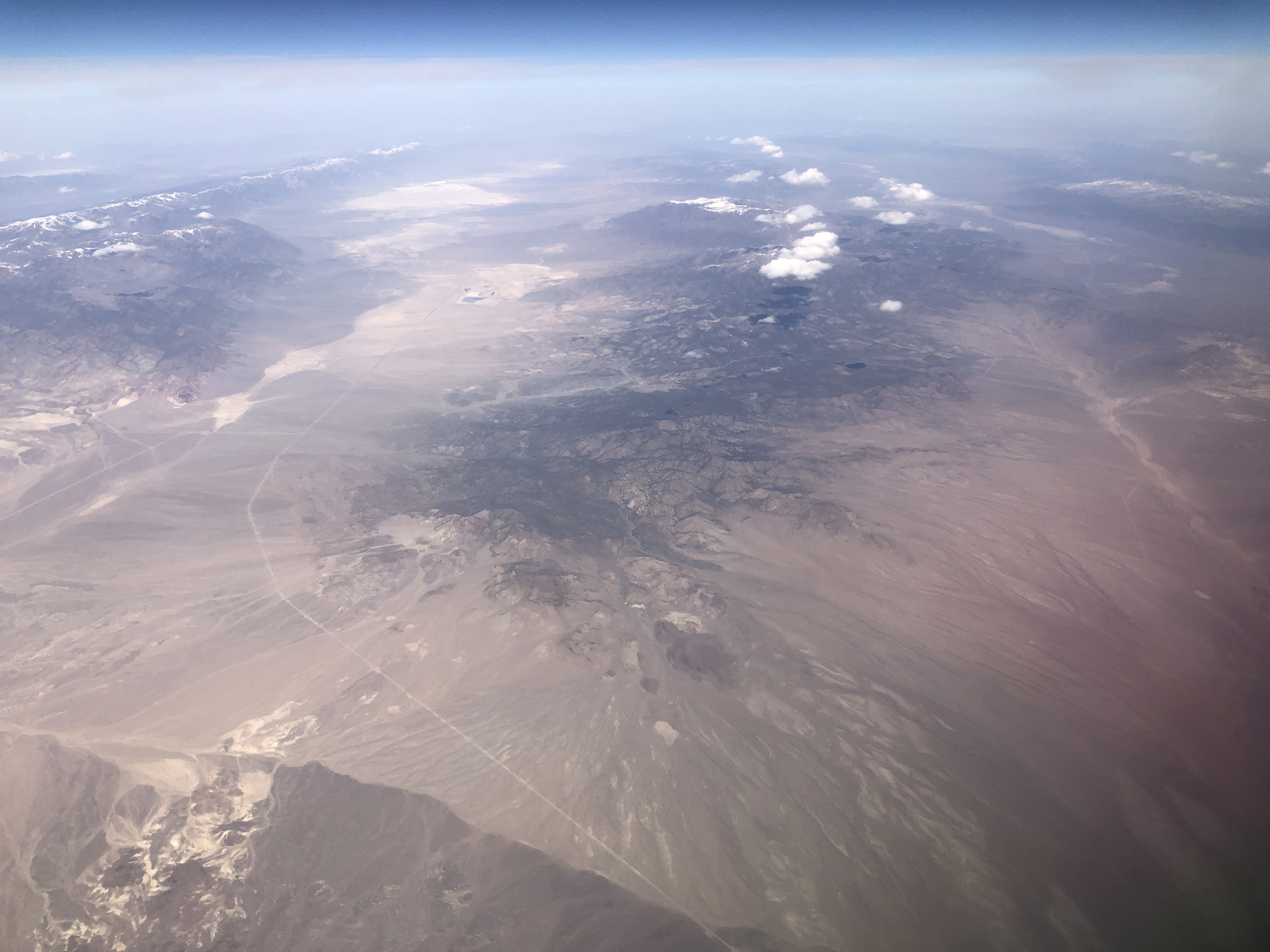
View north along the Toquima Range from an airplane

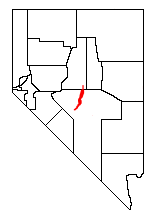
Location of the Toquima Range within Nevada

The Toquima Range is a mountain range, located primarily in Nye County with a small extension into Lander County, in Nevada, United States. Most of the range is included within the Humboldt–Toiyabe National Forest. The range reaches a maximum elevation of 11,949 feet (3,642 m) at the southern summit of Mount Jefferson. From Hickison Summit on U.S. Route 50, the range runs for approximately 71 miles (114 km) to the south-southwest. To its west are Big Smoky Valley, scenic State Route 376, and the large Toiyabe Range. To the east are remote Monitor Valley and the Monitor Range. Lying to the south of the range are U.S. Route 6 (Nevada) and the community of Tonopah, while to the north is U.S. Route 50 ("The Loneliest Highway in America"), leading to the small community of Austin.

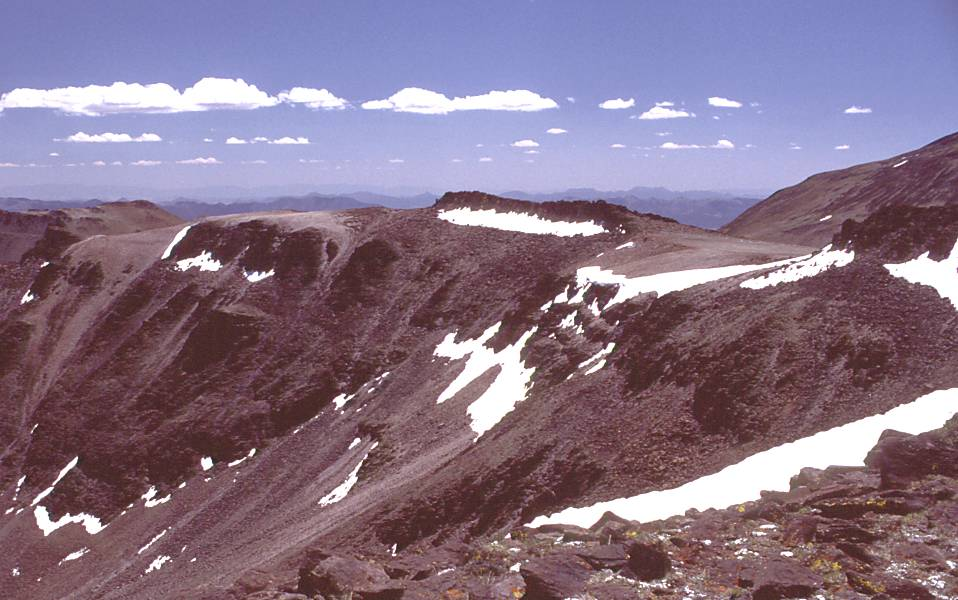
Cliffs on the eastern flanks of Mt. Jefferson, in the Toquima Range

The high central section of the Toquima Range is a large area of subalpine tundra surrounding the three summits of Mount Jefferson. This section of the range is protected as the Alta Toquima Wilderness Area.

South of this area are the historic mining district of Manhattan, Spanish Peak (10,746 ft; 3,275 m), and Shoshone Mountain (10,907 ft; 3,324 m). To the north are Wildcat Peak (10,507 ft; 3,203 m) and White Rock Mountain (10,156 ft; 3,096 m).
