= N15 =

N15 may refer to:

== Roads ==
- N15 road (Belgium), a National Road in Belgium
- Route nationale 15, in France
- N15 road (Ireland)
- A15 motorway (Netherlands)
- Nebraska Highway 15, in the United States

== Vehicles ==
- HMS Triton (N15), a submarine of the Royal Navy
- LNER Class N15, a British 0-6-2 steam locomotive class
- LSWR N15 class, a British 4-6-0 steam locomotive
- Nissan Almera (N15), a Japanese automobile sold in Europe
- Nissan Pulsar (N15), a Japanese automobile sold domestically

== Other uses ==
- N15 (Long Island bus), New York
- Enterobacteria phage N15
- Kingston Airport (Nevada), in Lander County, Nevada, United States
- London Buses route N15
- Nitrogen-15, an isotope of nitrogen
- Tonga language (Malawi)
- N15, a postcode district in the N postcode area

== See also ==
- 15N (disambiguation)
