= Draba serpentina =

Conservation status
- Critically Imperiled (NatureServe)

Scientific classification
- Kingdom: Plantae
- Clade: Tracheophytes
- Clade: Angiosperms
- Clade: Eudicots
- Clade: Rosids
- Order: Brassicales
- Family: Brassicaceae
- Genus: Draba
- Species: D. serpentina

Binomial name
- Draba serpentina (Tiehm & P.K.Holmgren) Al-Shehbaz & Windham

Species of flowering plant

Draba serpentina is a species of flowering plant in the family Brassicaceae known by the common name serpentine draba. It is endemic to Nevada in the United States, where it occurs in the Snake Range in White Pine County and the Toiyabe Range of Lander County.

Until 2007 this taxon was treated as a variety of Draba oreibata. The two were separated because they are different in morphology, in chromosome number, and in distribution, as they grow over 480 kilometers apart.

This is a small cushion-like plant with stems 3 to 13 centimeters long. It has up to 14 white flowers in its inflorescence, each with petals 5 or 6 millimeters long.
