= Hadley, Nevada =

Unincorporated community in Nevada, U.S.

- Unincorporated community
- View of Hadley from Nevada State Route 376

- Location within Nevada
- Coordinates: 38°41′53″N 117°09′44″W
- Country: United States
- State: Nevada
- Elevation: 5,761 ft (1,756 m)
- Time zone: UTC-8 (Pacific)
  - Summer (DST): UTC-7 (PDT)

Hadley, Nevada is an unincorporated community and company town in Nye County, Nevada, located off of State Route 376 approximately 56 miles by road north of Tonopah and approximately 66 miles by road south of Austin. The nearest town is Carvers, 5 miles to the north (8 miles by road).

As mining properties at Round Mountain changed hands in the 1970s and 1980s the emphasis on the methodology of the recovery of ore swung from the adits and stopes of underground mining to the open pit. In 1987 Round Mountain Gold began expanding their operations and the need to open up additional housing for the influx of employees became apparent. Legal questions regarding the land at the Round Mountain townsite precluded expansion at that location; the company began exploring other feasible options and within the next two years had acquired the ICT Ranch in Smoky Valley from one Ingvard Christianson and began platting and construction at the new town's site.

While the original town of Round Mountain remains near the current mining operation, the construction of Hadley served, in essence, as a relocation of the former community. As such, and with the new town existing as of, by, and for Round Mountain Gold, the surrounding areas, including both towns (occasionally including the town of Carvers as well), are often generically referred to as Round Mountain. In Hadley there is an elementary school, a high school, a library, a swimming pool, a golf course and a football field.
