= 15N =

15N may refer to:

- Nitrogen-15 (^{15}N), an isotope of nitrogen
  - Δ15N, use of the isotope in paleoclimatology and hydrology
  - Nitrogen-15 nuclear magnetic resonance spectroscopy, use of the isotope in spectroscopy
- Jenkins Airport (FAA code: N15), Wyoming, Kent County, Delaware, United States

== See also ==
- N15 (disambiguation)
