= Arc Dome Wilderness =

Protected wilderness area in Nevada, United States

- IUCN category Ib (wilderness area)
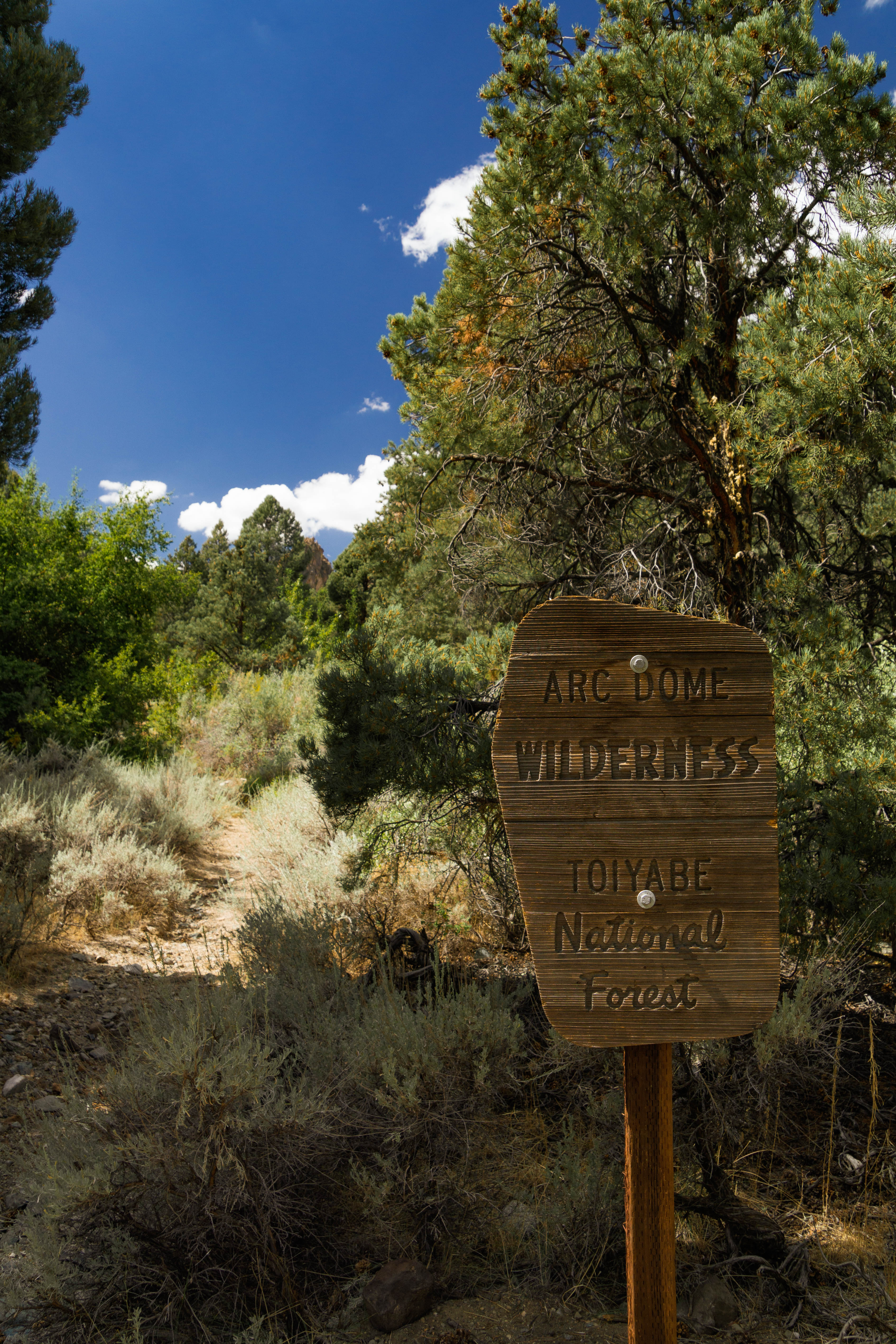
- Arc Dome Wilderness Boundary

- Location within Nevada Location within the United States
- Location: Nye County, Nevada USA
- Nearest city: Tonopah, NV
- Coordinates: 38.8032635°N 117.3228693°W
- Area: 115,000 acres (47,000 ha)
- Established: 1989
- Governing body: U.S. Forest Service
- Website: www.fs.fed.us/r4/htnf/recreation/wilderness/arc_dome.shtml

The Arc Dome Wilderness is a protected wilderness area in the Toiyabe Range of Nye County, in the central section of the state of Nevada in the western United States. It covers an area of approximately 115,000 acres (47,000 ha), Nevada's largest Wilderness area. Attractions include the 70-mile (110 km)-long Toiyabe Crest Trail offers travelers atop the ridge of the Toiyabe Range, including 30 miles (48 km) within the Arc Dome Wilderness.

Wildlife in the Wilderness includes Columbia spotted frog, mule deer, sharp-shinned hawk, golden eagle, Clark's nutcracker, sagebrush sparrow, sagebrush vole, black-throated gray warbler, yellow warbler, northern goshawk, big brown bat, and Great Basin skink.

The Arc Dome Wilderness is administered by the Humboldt-Toiyabe National Forest.

== Gallery ==
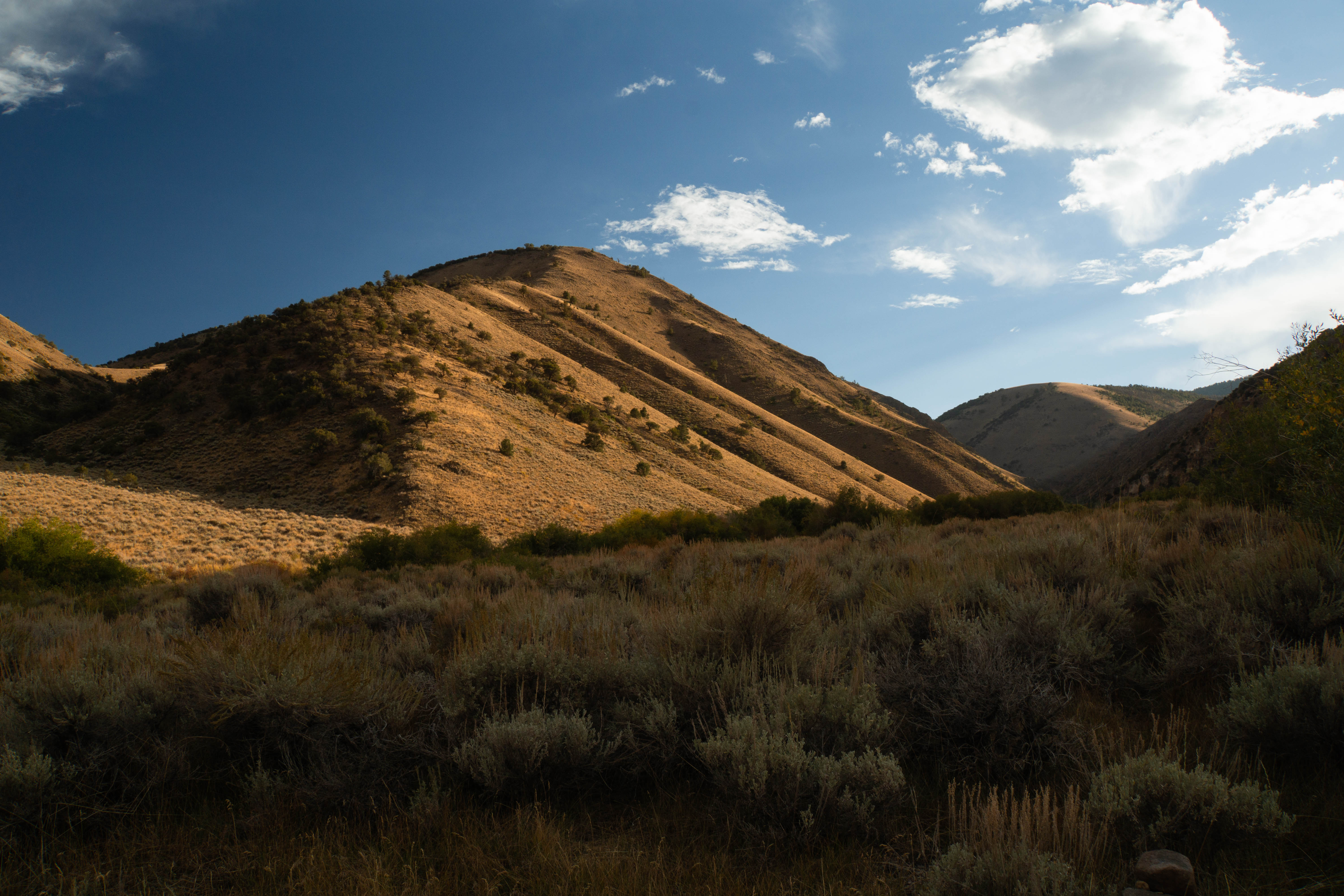
View of the relief of the Toiyabe Range within the Arc Dome Wilderness

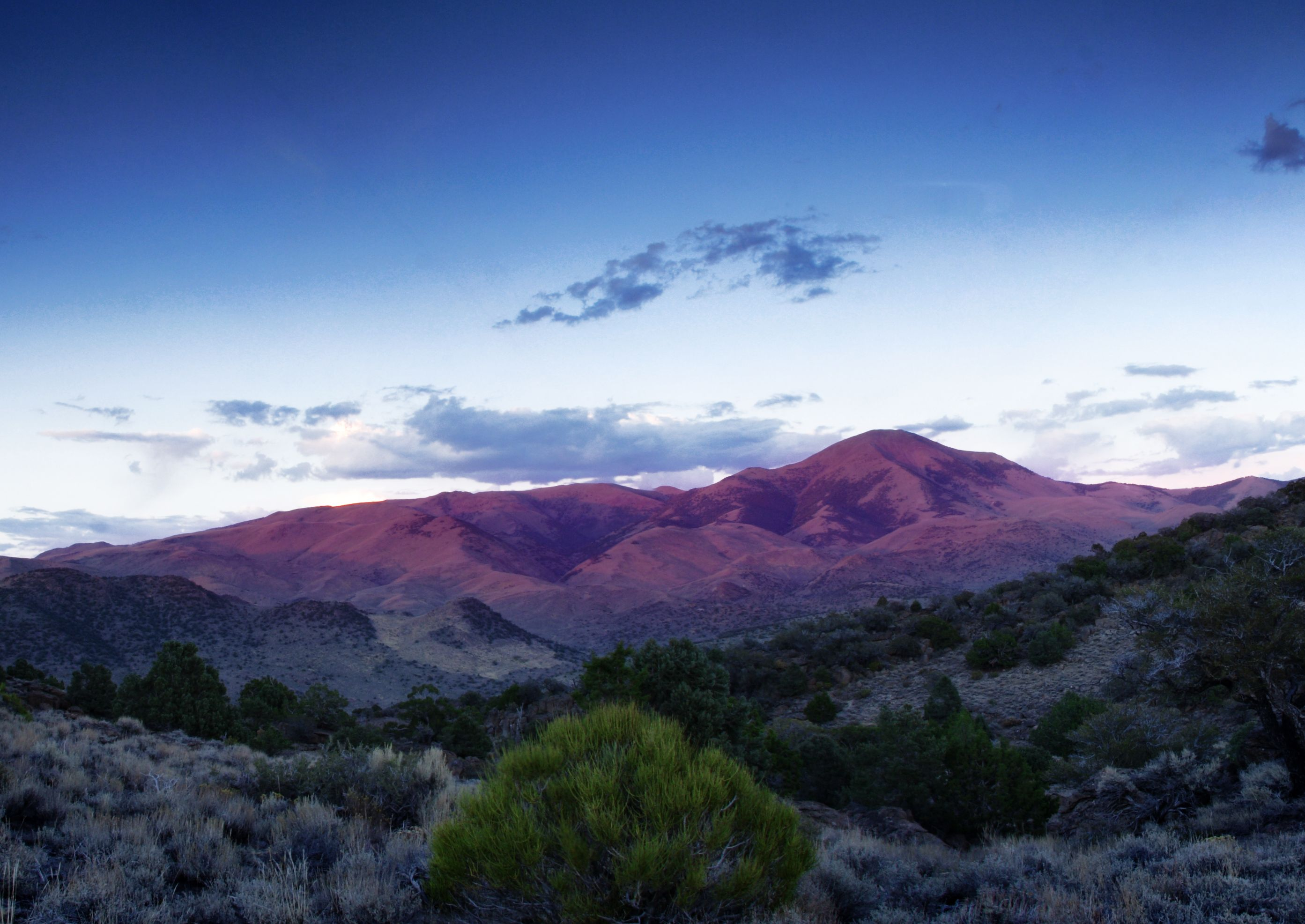
View of Arc Dome at Sunset from Cow Canyon Trailhead

== See also ==
- Arc Dome
- List of U.S. Wilderness Areas
- Wilderness Act
