= Nevada State Route 376 =

State highway in Nye and Lander counties in Nevada, United States

State Route 376
- Tonopah–Austin Road
- SR 376 highlighted in red

Route information
- Maintained by NDOT
- Length: 99.810 mi (160.629 km)
- Existed: 1976–present
- History: Established as part of SR 8A by 1929

Major junctions
- South end: US 6 east of Tonopah
- North end: US 50 southeast of Austin

Location
- Country: United States
- State: Nevada
- Counties: Nye, Lander

Highway system
- Nevada State Highway System; Interstate; US; State; Pre‑1976; Scenic
← SR 375	→ SR 377

State Route 376 (SR 376) is a 100-mile (160 km) state highway in Nye and Lander counties in central Nevada, United States. It connects U.S. Route 6 (US 6) near Tonopah north to U.S. Route 50 near Austin. The Tonopah–Austin Road existed as early as 1919, and was designated the southernmost segment of State Route 8A before being renumbered to SR 376 in 1976.

== Route description ==
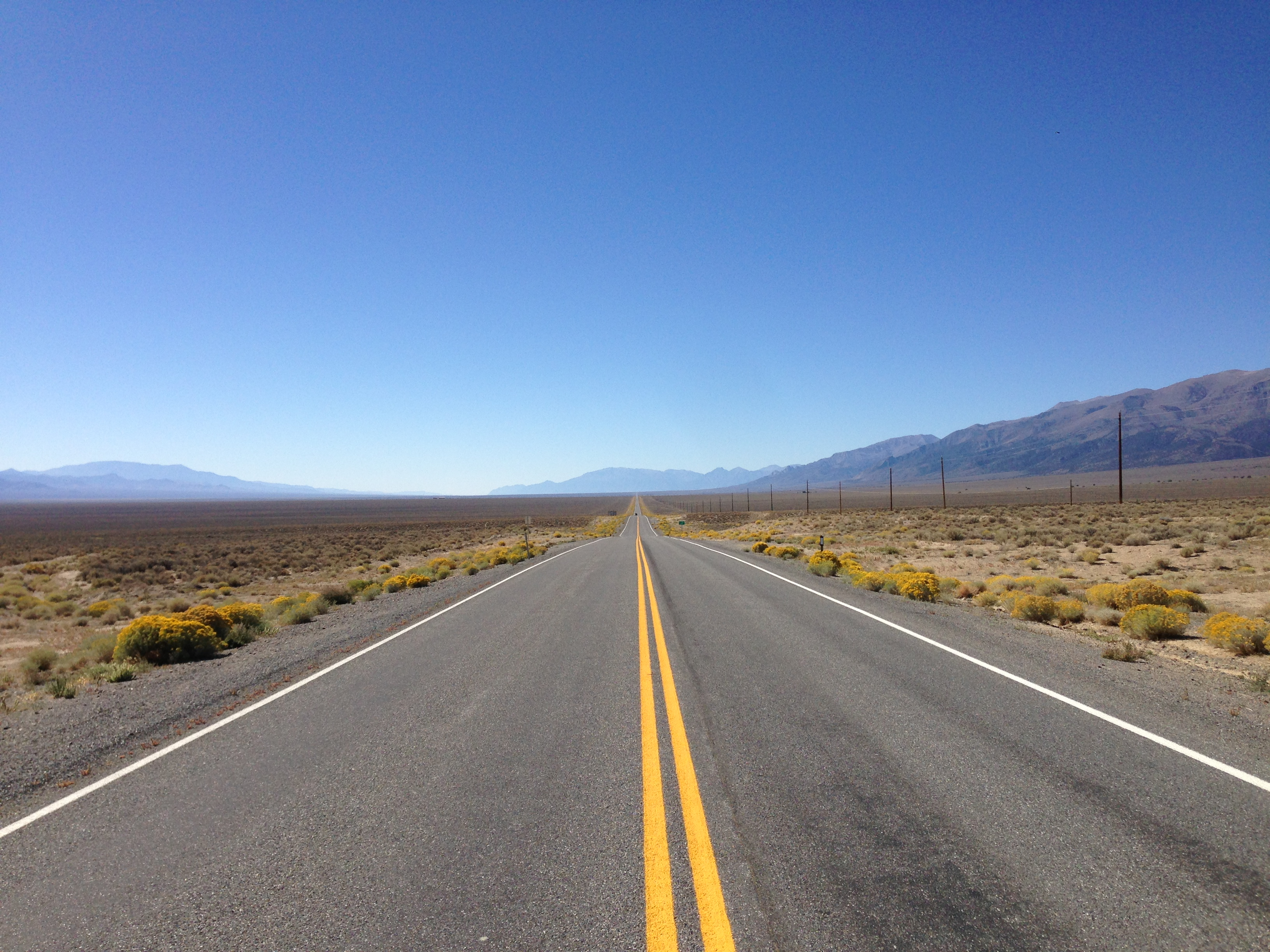
View south along State Route 376 near US 50, September 2013

The southern terminus of State Route 376 is located about 5 miles (8.0 km) east of Tonopah on US 6 in western Nye County. From there, the highway heads north through the Ralston Valley for about 13 miles (21 km). The route then curves westward around some mountains to enter the southern end of the Big Smoky Valley. SR 376 continues northeastward through the center of the valley, providing access to Manhattan (via State Route 377) and Round Mountain.

Passing the Round Mountain turnoff, SR 376 shifts to the west edge of Big Smoky Valley, passing through Carvers in the process. The highway passes east of the Arc Dome, the highest point of the Toiyabe Range. Following the base of the Toiyabe mountains, the route continues northward for several miles to enter Lander County near the community of Kingston. 16 miles (26 km) north of Kingston, State Route 376 reaches its northern terminus at a junction with US 50 about 12 miles (19 km) southeast of Austin.

== History ==
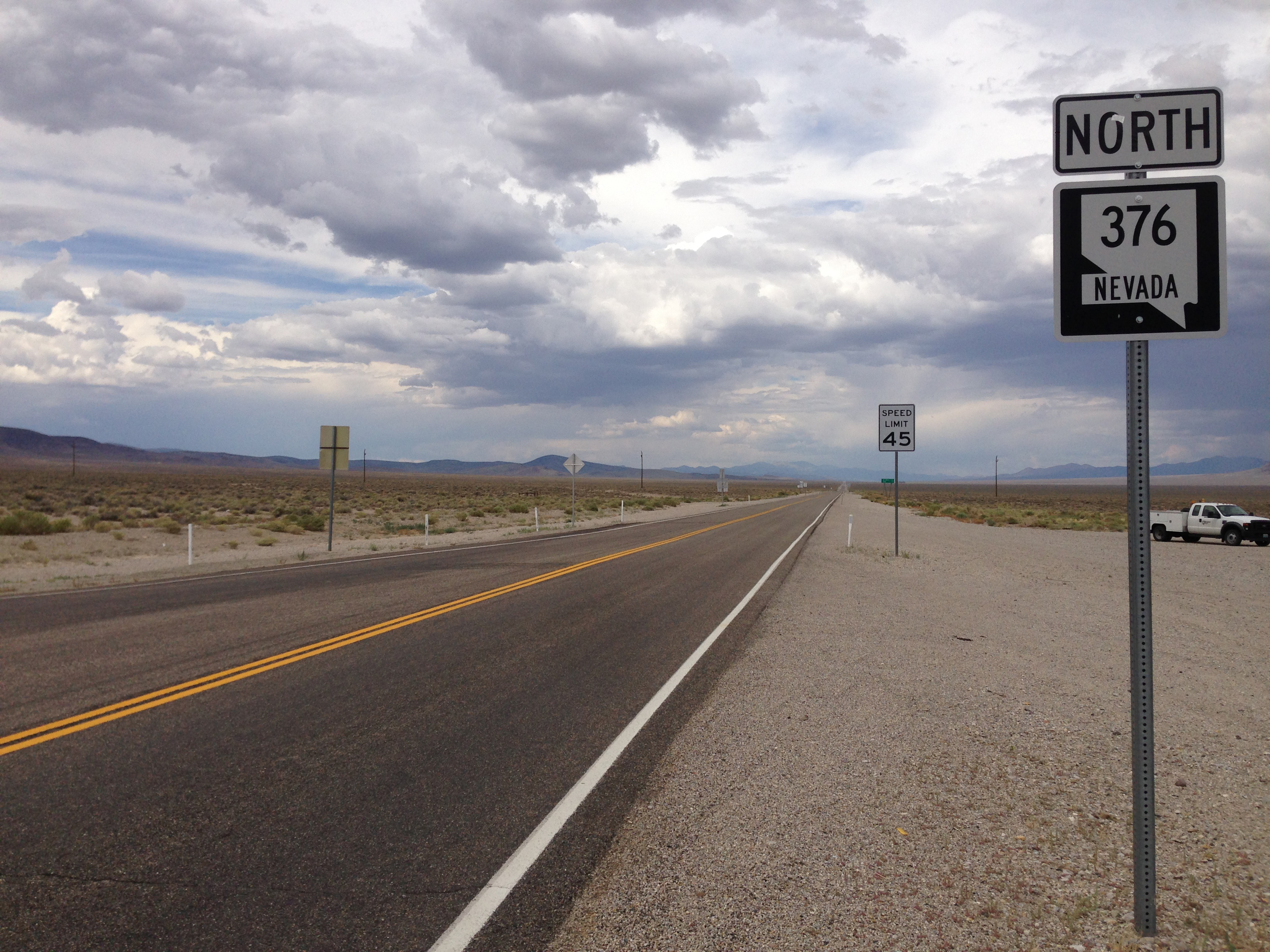
First reassurance sign along northbound SR 376, July 2014

SR 376 was previously the southernmost segment of State Route 8A

Roads linking Tonopah to Austin appear on Nevada maps as early as 1919, although it the exact composition of the route and its highway number was not clearly distinguished. By 1929, a mostly-unimproved route connecting Tonopah to US 50 east of Austin had been clearly established as the southern portion of State Route 8A. This early iteration of the route passed directly through Manhattan and Round Mountain. By 1933, the routing of SR 8A had bypassed the two towns to the west. The southern terminus of the highway was moved 6 miles (9.7 km) east of Tonopah on US 6 by 1937. SR 8A had become a paved highway throughout its entire length by 1950.

State Route 8A remained relatively unchanged for many years after it was paved. However, the route number was changed in the 1976 renumbering of Nevada's state highways. The SR 8A designation was eliminated and replaced by State Route 376 on July 1, 1976. This change was first seen on the 1978–79 version of Nevada's state highway map. The highway has not been changed since its renumbering.

== Major intersections ==
Note: Mileposts in Nevada reset at county lines. The start and end mileposts for each county are given in the county column.

County	Location	mi	km	Destinations	Notes
Nye; 0.00-81.75		0.00	0.00	US 6 – Tonopah, Ely	Southern terminus
Nye; 0.00-81.75				Belmont Road – Belmont	former SR 82
Nye; 0.00-81.75				SR 377 – Manhattan	
Nye; 0.00-81.75				Round Mountain Road – Round Mountain	
Lander; 0.00-18.06		18.06	29.06	US 50 (Lincoln Highway) – Austin, Eureka	Northern terminus
1.000 mi = 1.609 km; 1.000 km = 0.621 mi

== See also ==
- Other segments of former State Route 8A:
  - State Route 140, the northern segment that ran west from U.S. Route 95 via Denio to northwestern Nevada.
  - State Route 305, the central segment that ran from Austin to Battle Mountain.
