= Arc Dome =

Mountain in Nevada, United States

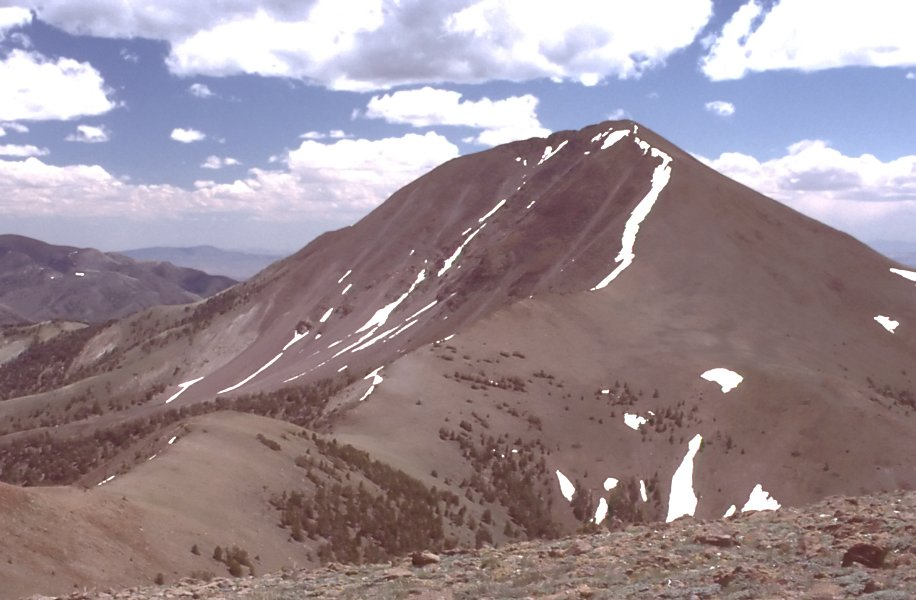

Highest point
- Elevation: 11,780 ft (3,591 m) NAVD 88
- Prominence: 5,213 ft (1,589 m)
- Listing: U.S. most prominent peaks 112th; Desert Peaks Section List; Great Basin Peaks List Star peak
- Coordinates: 38°49′58″N 117°21′11″W

Geography
- Location within Nevada
- Location: Nye County, Nevada, U.S.
- Parent range: Toiyabe Range
- Topo map: USGS Arc Dome

Climbing
- Easiest route: Hike along the North ridge, class 1

Arc Dome is the highest mountain of the Toiyabe Range in northwestern Nye County, Nevada, United States. It is the thirteenth-highest mountain in the state. Arc Dome also ranks as the second-most topographically prominent peak in Nye County and the eighth-most prominent peak in the state. The peak is located about 53 miles (85 km) north of the community of Tonopah, within the Arc Dome Wilderness of the Humboldt-Toiyabe National Forest.

Arc Dome is sometimes confused with Toiyabe Dome. The fact that the summit benchmark is marked “Toiyabe Dome” only adds to this confusion. However, these are separate peaks. Toiyabe Dome at 11,361 feet (3,463 m) is about 5 miles (8.0 km) southeast of Arc Dome, above the small community of Carvers, Nevada.

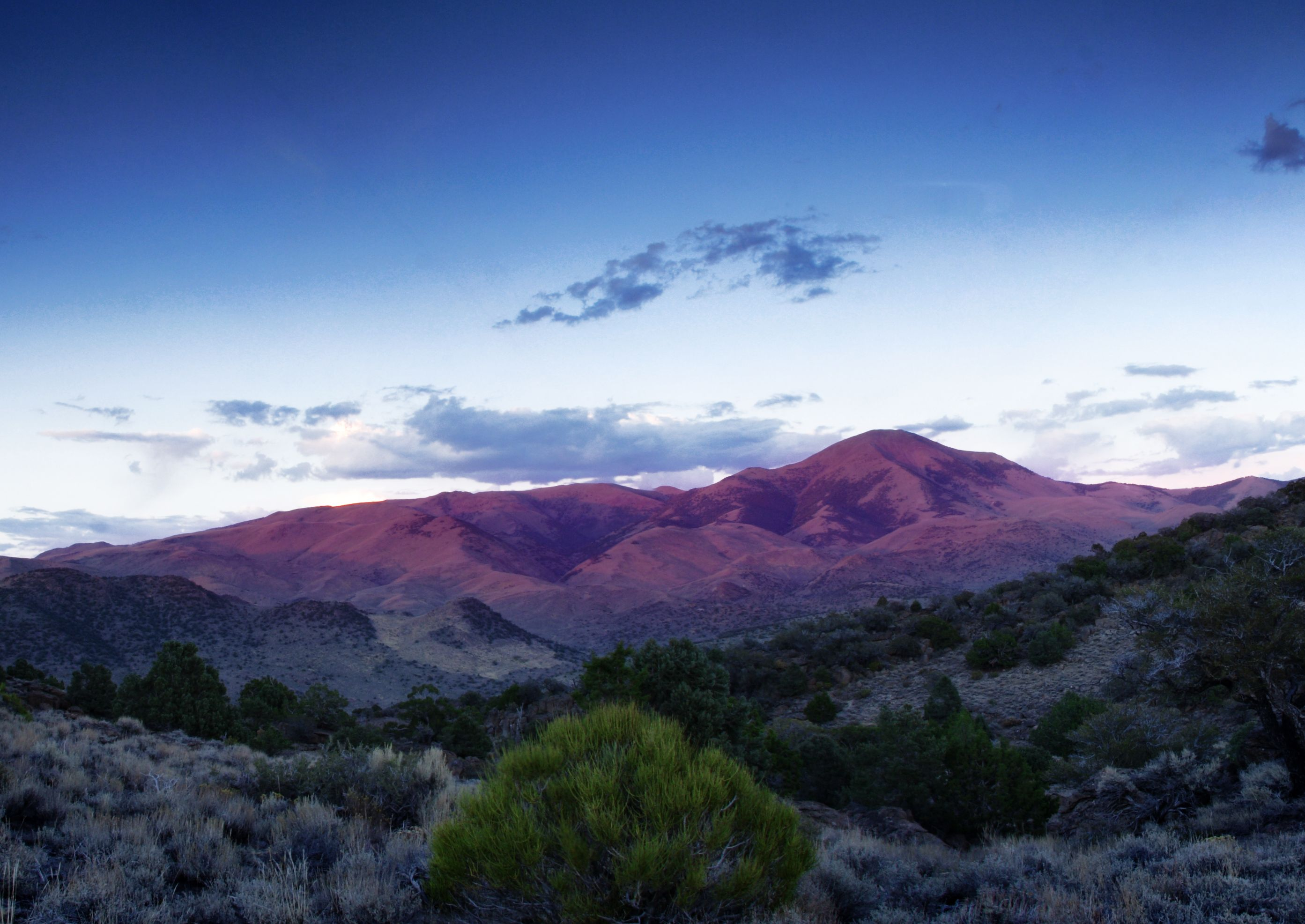
Arc Dome at sunset from Cow Canyon Trailhead

== See also ==
- List of Ultras of the United States
