= Belmont, Nevada =

Ghost town in Nevada, United States

- Belmont
- U.S. National Register of Historic Places
- U.S. Historic district
- Nevada Historical Marker No. 138
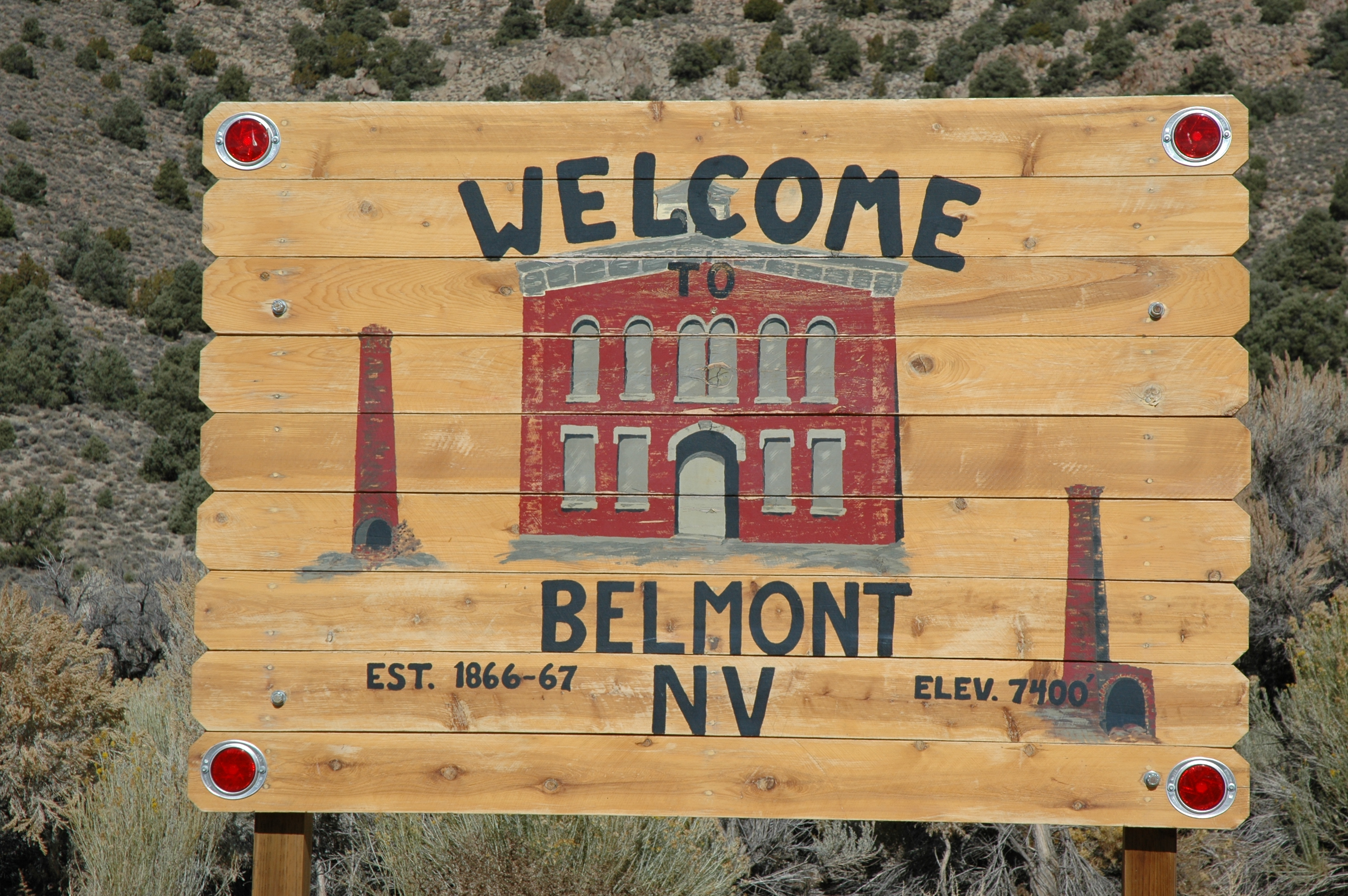
- Belmont welcome sign on the edge of town

- Location within Nevada Location within the United States
- Location: 46 miles northeast of Tonopah off State Route 376
- Nearest city: Tonopah, Nevada
- Coordinates: 38°35′42″N 116°52′34″W
- Built: 1865
- NRHP reference No.: 72000766
- Marker No.: 138
- Added to NRHP: June 13, 1972

Belmont is a ghost town in Nye County, Nevada, United States along former State Route 82. The town is a historic district listed in the National Register of Historic Places. It is Nevada Historical Marker number 138.

== History ==
Belmont was established following a silver strike in 1865. Other minerals, such as copper, lead and antimony, were also mined in addition to the silver. The boom brought settlers in and the town of Belmont grew. In 1867, Belmont became the county seat of Nye County. The town boasted four stores, two saloons, five restaurants, livery stable, post office, assay office, bank, school, telegraph office, two newspapers, and a blacksmith shop. As the price of metals fluctuated, so did the fortunes of the town.

By 1887, several of the mines closed. In 1905, the county seat of Nye County was relocated from Belmont to Tonopah. The mine dumps were reworked in the early part of the 20th century

The post office was in operation from April 1867 until May 1911 and then again from September 1915 until 1922.

During the 1870s it was known as a major mining boomtown producing silver, and was rumored to have a population of 15,000. However, the total population for the whole county did not top 9,000 people until 1980 so the rumored population total is highly unlikely. Another source puts the peak population of Belmont at 2,000 in the 1870s. Like many towns which are now ghost towns, this one lasted for only a short time.

The population was 28 in 1940.

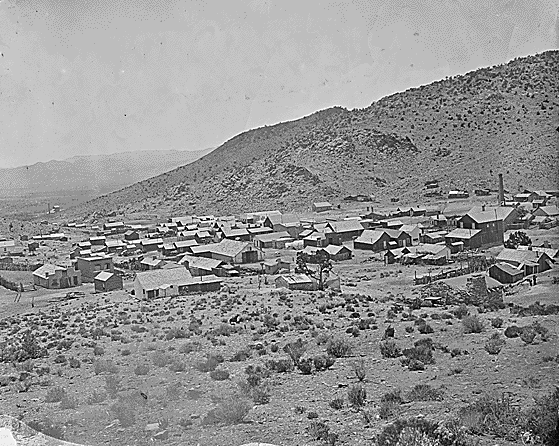
Belmont in 1871. Photo by Timothy H. O'Sullivan.

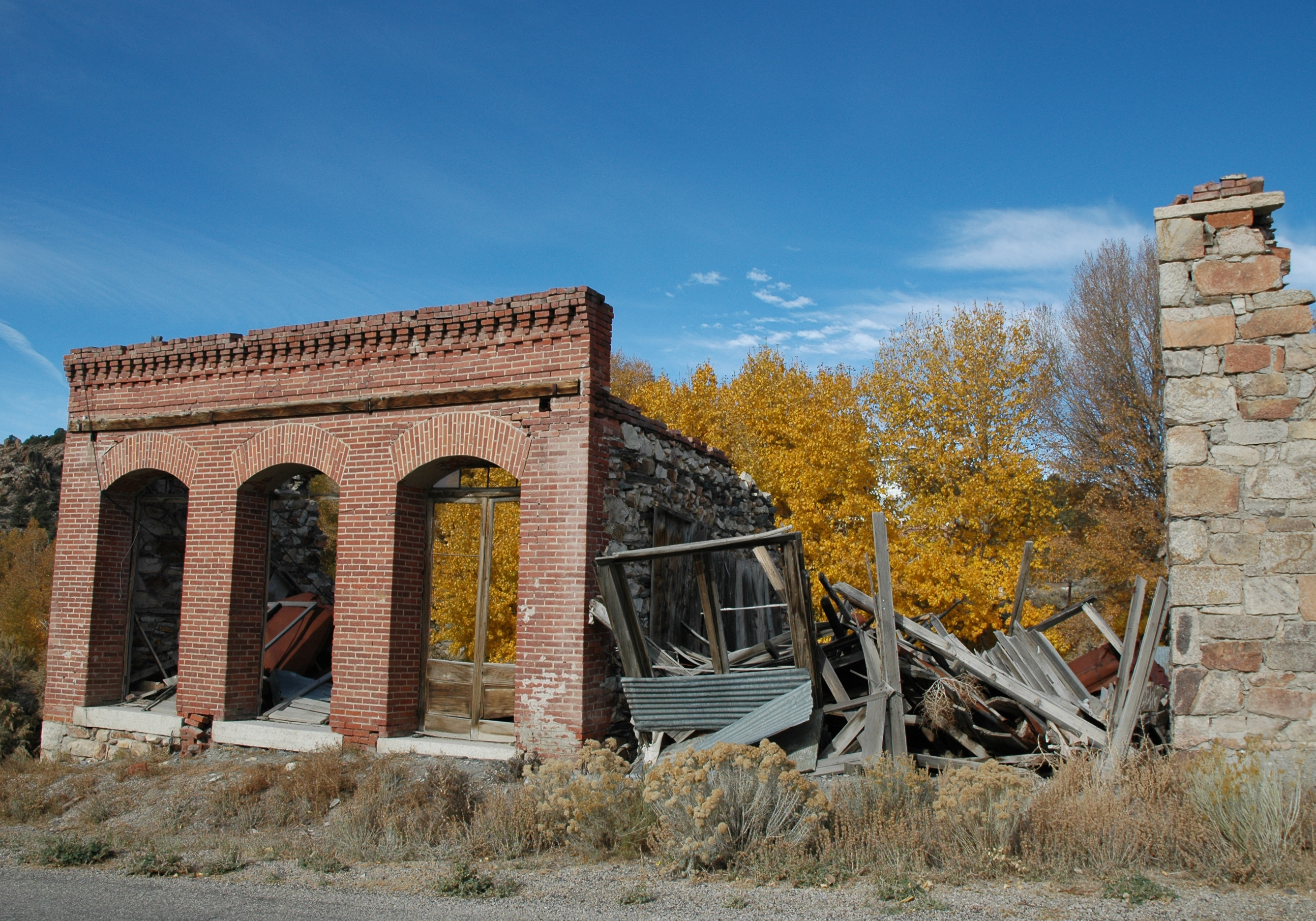
Ruined building

== Present-day Belmont ==
Some of the buildings still standing include the original Nye County Courthouse, the Cosmopolitan Saloon, the Monitor-Belmont Mill, and the combination mill. Currently, the old Combination Mine and Mill office and Belmont Courier Newspaper office and associated buildings are under restoration and preservation, known as the Philadelphia House, a reference to the name of the lodging house in the 1880s, and the Philadelphia mining district. This building complex was a business for about 15 years known as the Belmont Inn and Saloon, and also the Monitor Inn. Restoration volunteers are being solicited.

To the south of the site there is the Belmont Courthouse now belonging to Nye County and cared for by the "Friends of the Belmont Courthouse". The transfer from the Belmont Courthouse State Historical Park to Nye County took place in 2012.

== See also ==
- List of ghost towns in Nevada
