= Bunker Hill (Nevada) =

Mountain in Nevada, United States

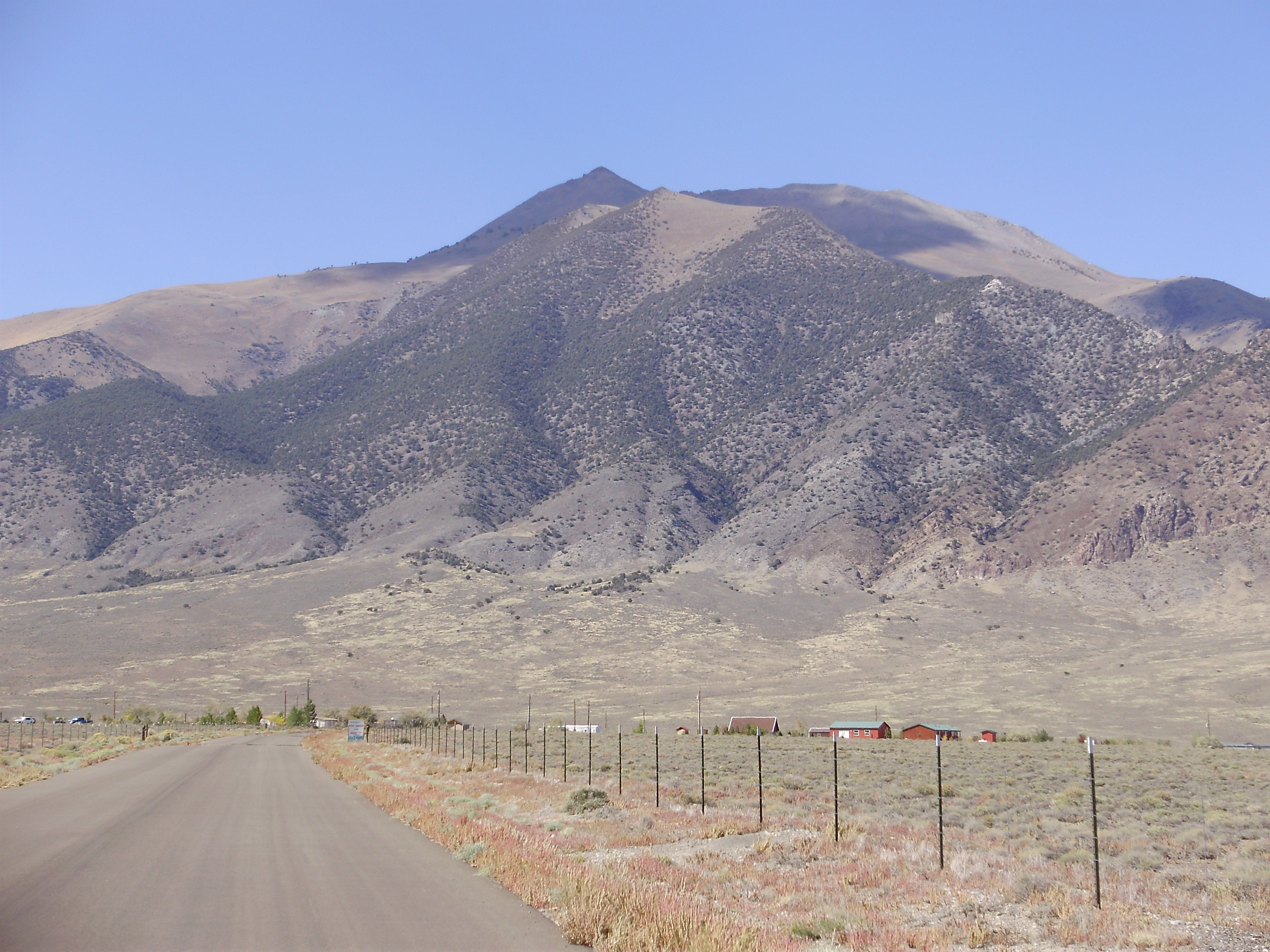
- View of Bunker Hill from Kingston

Highest point
- Elevation: 11,477 ft (3,498 m) NAVD 88
- Prominence: 2,793 ft (851 m)
- Listing: Nevada County High Points 5th
- Coordinates: 39°15′10″N 117°07′34″W

Geography
- Location within Nevada
- Location: Lander County, Nevada, U.S.
- Parent range: Toiyabe Range
- Topo map: USGS BUNKER HILL

Climbing
- Easiest route: From Kingston Summit, southeast along a 4-wheel drive road and then the ridgeline, Class 2 scramble

Bunker Hill is the highest mountain in Lander County, within the Toiyabe Range of central Nevada, United States. It is the twenty-second highest mountain in the state. The peak is located within the Austin Ranger District of the Humboldt-Toiyabe National Forest, about 17 miles south of the small town of Austin and just northwest of the small town of Kingston.

== Summit panorama ==
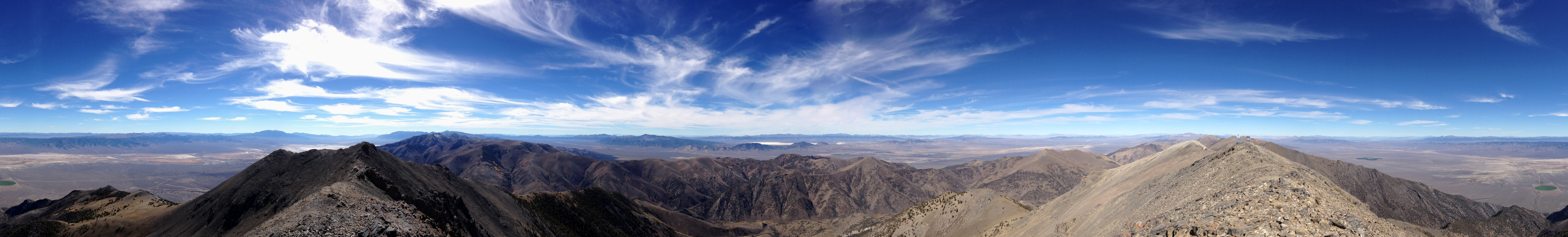
360-degree panorama from the summit of Bunker Hill
