= Alta Toquima Wilderness =

Protected wilderness area in Nevada, United States

- IUCN category Ib (wilderness area)
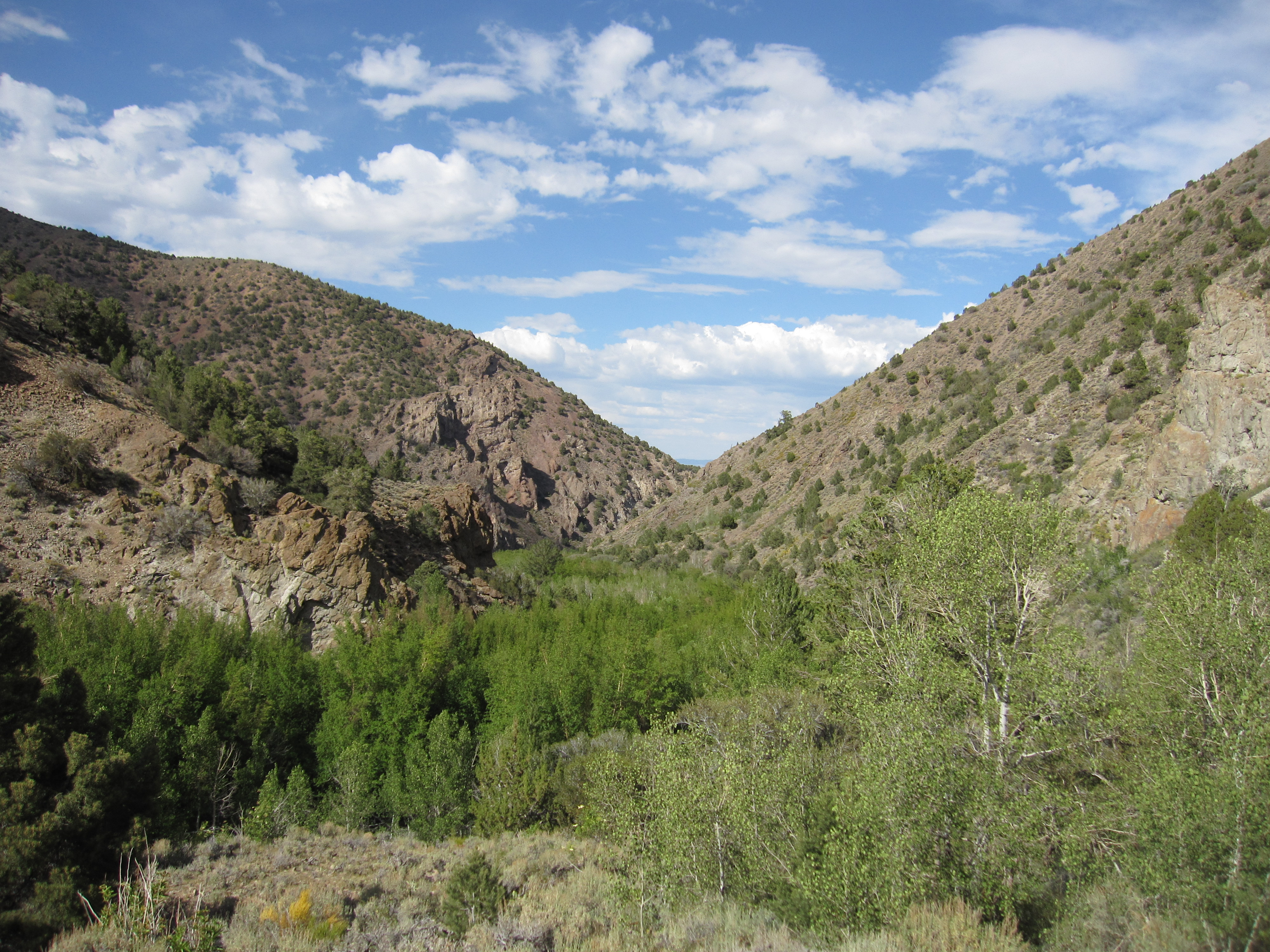

- Location within the United States
- Location: Nye County, Nevada U.S.
- Nearest city: Tonopah, Nevada
- Coordinates: 38°47′20″N 116°55′26″W
- Area: 35,860 acres (14,510 ha)
- Designated: 1989
- Governing body: U.S. Forest Service

The Alta Toquima Wilderness is a protected wilderness area in the Toquima Range of Nye County, in the central section of the state of Nevada in the western United States. It covers an area of 35,860 acres (14,510 ha), and is administered by the Humboldt-Toiyabe National Forest. The Mount Jefferson Research Natural Area protects 4,953 acres (2,004 ha) around Mount Jefferson, the highest peak in the Toquima Range and Nye County. The Mount Jefferson Research Natural Area is one of the most unusual environments in the United States, due to its extreme alpine conditions. Wildlife is plentiful in the Wilderness, including bighorn sheep, deer, grouse, chukar and native trout.

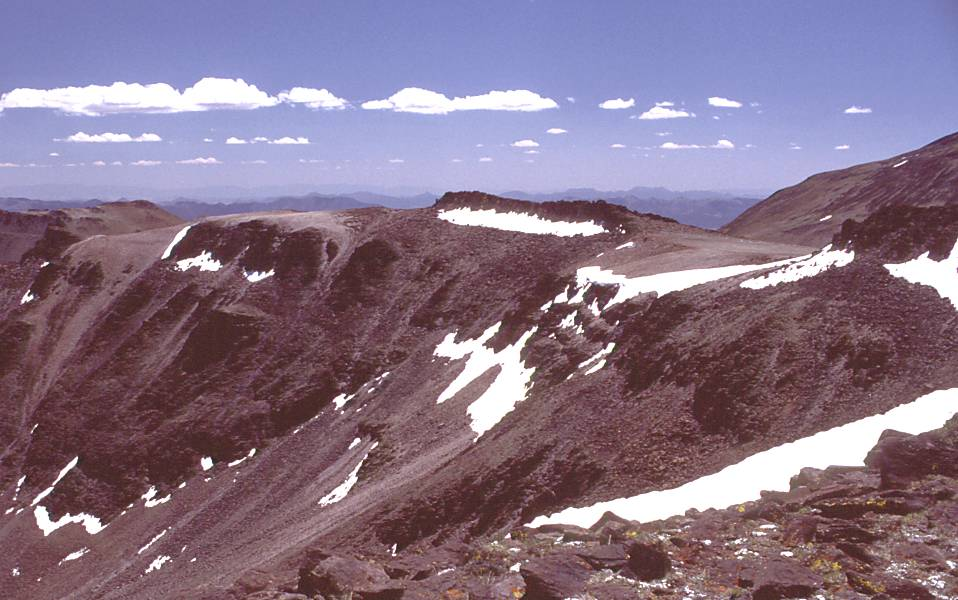
Cliffs on the eastern flanks of Mt. Jefferson, in the Alta Toquima Wilderness

== See also ==
- List of U.S. Wilderness Areas
- Wilderness Act
