= Nevada State Route 82 =

State highway in Nevada, United States

State Route 82

Route information
- Length: 121 mi (195 km)
- Existed: 1942–1981

Major junctions
- South end: SR 8A
- North end: US 50

Location
- Country: United States
- State: Nevada

Highway system
- Nevada State Highway System; Interstate; US; State; Pre‑1976; Scenic

Former State Route 82 (SR 82), also known as Belmont Road, is a road in Nye and Eureka counties in the U.S. state of Nevada, extending from State Route 376 (former State Route 8A) north of Tonopah northeast to U.S. Route 50 west of Eureka via Belmont. The southern portion from SR 376 to Belmont is paved, but the northern segment is unimproved.

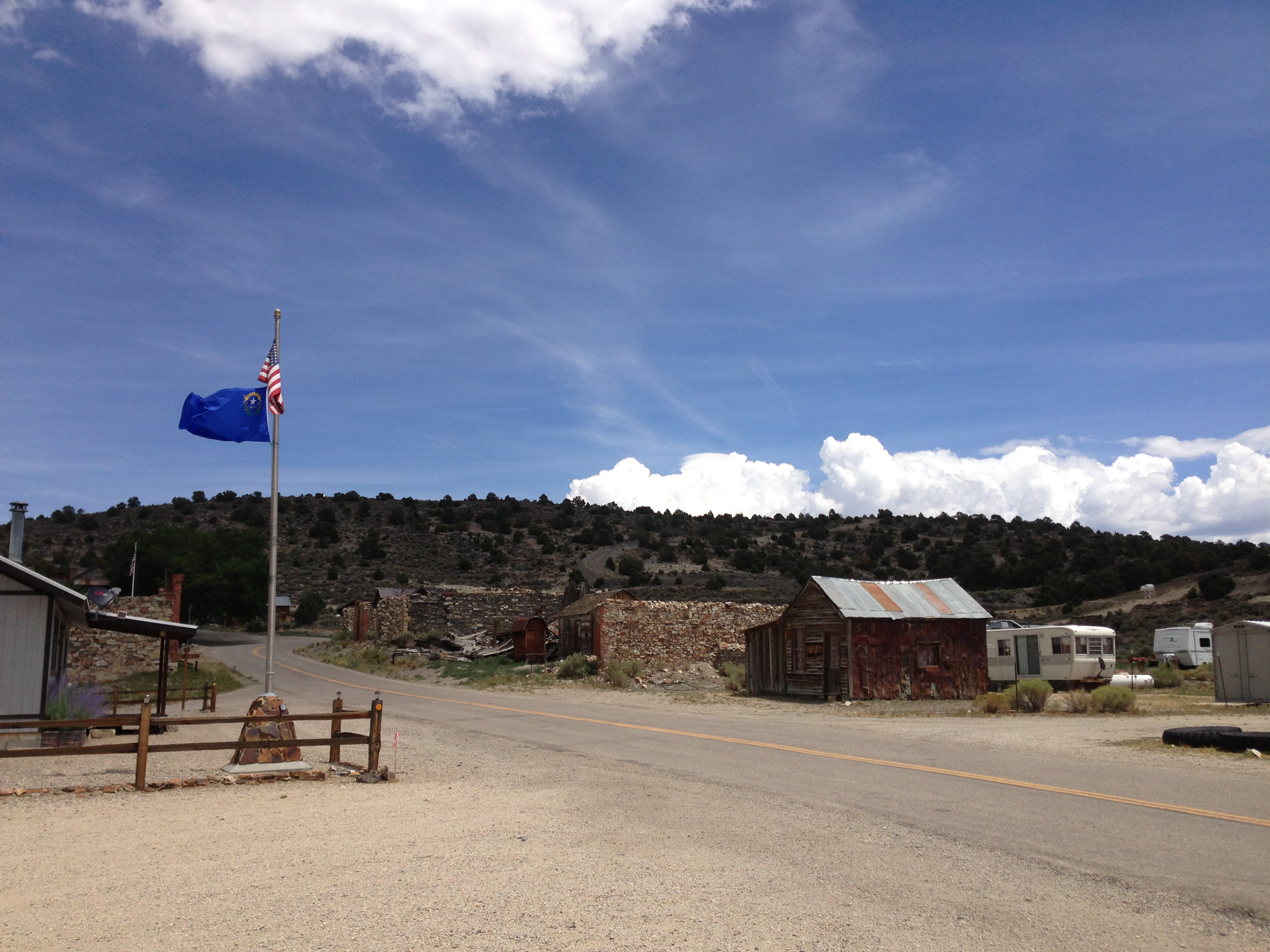
Former SR 82 in Belmont

Although still commonly referred to as State Route 82, the highway is not maintained by the Nevada Department of Transportation. It was eliminated as a state route as part of a Nevada state route renumbering project that began in 1976. The highway last appeared as a state route in the 1980 edition of the official Nevada Highway Map.
