= Nevada State Route 377 =

State highway in Nevada, United States

State Route 377
- Manhattan Road
- SR 377 highlighted in red

Route information
- Maintained by NDOT
- Length: 6.597 mi (10.617 km)
- Existed: 1976–present

Major junctions
- West end: SR 376 near Manhattan
- East end: Manhattan

Location
- Country: United States
- State: Nevada
- County: Nye

Highway system
- Nevada State Highway System; Interstate; US; State; Pre‑1976; Scenic
← SR 376	→ SR 379

State Route 377 (SR 377) is a 6.6-mile (10.6 km) state highway in Nye County, Nevada, United States. The route connects the town of Manhattan to State Route 376. The highway previously existed as State Route 69.

== Route description ==
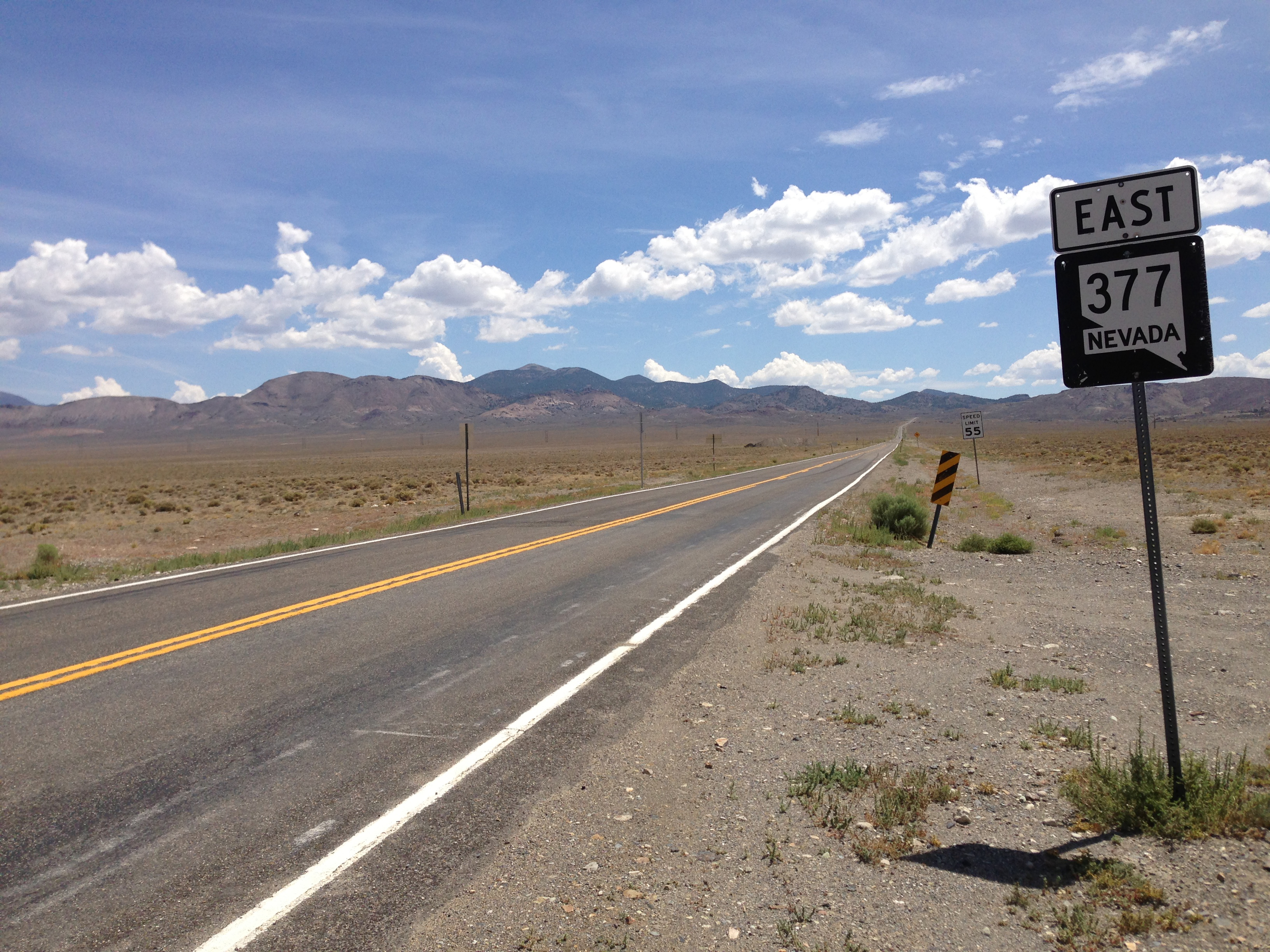
First reassurance sign along eastbound SR 377

SR 377 begins at a junction with SR 376 in the center of the Big Smoky Valley in northwestern Nye County. The route heads southeasterly, passing through some mountains as it heads towards Manhattan. The highway comes to an end on Main Street in the middle of the town.

== History ==
State Route 69
- Existed: 1942–1976

An unimproved road linking Manhattan westward to State Route 8A (now SR 376) existed as early as 1936. By 1942, this road was designated as State Route 69. The route was improved to a gravel surface by 1946 but would not actually be paved until 1976.

Shortly after paving, the highway was affected by the 1976 renumbering of Nevada's state highways. The SR 69 designation was eliminated and replaced by State Route 377 on July 1, 1976, possibly due to the sexual connotation of the number; maps began to reflect this change in 1978.

== Major intersections ==
The entire route is in Nye County.

Location	mi	km	Destinations	Notes
	0.00	0.00	SR 376 – Austin, Tonopah	Western terminus
Manhattan	6.60	10.62	Main Street	Continuation beyond terminus
1.000 mi = 1.609 km; 1.000 km = 0.621 mi
