= Kingston Airport (Nevada) =

- IATA: none; ICAO: none; FAA LID: N15

Summary
- Airport type: Public
- Operator: U.S. Bureau of Land Management
- Location: Kingston, Nevada
- Elevation AMSL: 5,950 ft (1,810 m)
- Coordinates: 39°12′11″N 117°03′52″W
- Interactive map of Kingston Airport

Runways
Direction	Length		Surface
Direction	ft	m	Surface
7/25	3,700	1,128	Gravel/soil
16/34	3,072	936	Gravel/dirt

Kingston Airport (FAA LID: N15) is a public airport located two miles (3 km) east of the central business district (CBD) of Kingston, in Lander County, Nevada, United States.

== Facilities ==
Kingston Airport covers 144 acres (58 ha) and has two runways:

- Runway 7/25: 3,700 x 80 ft. (1,128 x 24 m), surface: gravel/dirt
- Runway 16/34: 3,072 x 60 ft. (936 x 18 m), surface: gravel/dirt

== See also ==
- List of airports in Nevada
