= White Rock Mountain =

Mountain in southeastern Oklahoma

Coordinates: 34°21′03″N 95°41′27″W

White Rock Mountain is an officially-designated mountain in Pushmataha County, Oklahoma. Its elevation is 1,027 feet.

The mountain is thought to receive its name from its most distinctive, defining characteristic: a high ridge of white rock which runs east to west across the top of its southern slope. The mountain and its band of white rock may be seen from as far away as Antlers, Oklahoma (eight miles).

White Rock Mountain is a part of the Kiamichi Mountains, an ancient mountain chain. These mountains, which originally reached a height of 17,000 feet, date from 358 to 323 million years ago. White Rock Mountain forms part of the eastern edge of Impson Valley, and overlooks Moyers, Oklahoma. White Rock Mountain is part of the sandstone Wildhorse Formation, part of the Jackfork Group, for stratigraphic nomenclature, along with the neighboring mountain peaks of Razorback and Parker.

The area’s scenic and tourist potential has been noted by local residents for many years. In 1926 several area residents climbed the mountain, despite the difficulty of getting from bottom to top, an event recorded by a local newspaper. In 1961 a pioneer recalled scaling the mountain in his youth and then having to walk several miles along its top to find a way back down. The mountain has a series of bluffs, one of which he said is “hundreds of feet high.” It was the view from the top and these bluffs which prompted one local columnist in 1962 to suggest that White Rock Mountain was ripe for tourism, prompting him to describe it as a “geological phenomena, and unsurpassed as a potential tourist attraction.”

In 1976 the area’s tourist potential was tested for the first time with the launch of Kiamichi Wilderness, Inc., a large-scale real estate development encompassing over 12,000 acres. Portions of the development took place on White Rock Mountain, although the development itself centers on adjacent Big Mountain (Oklahoma). While tourism did not pan out in the Kiamichi Wilderness, all its available parcels sold and today its residents form a rural, if sprawling, community. Its front gate is on Big Mountain; interior roads maintained by landowners provide access to the northern and western areas of White Rock Mountain.

During World War II two Royal Air Force military aircraft known as Advanced Trainers, or AT6s, flying from a British flying training school at Terrell, Texas, crashed in the Kiamichi Mountains during poor weather. One AT6 crash, on the southern slope of White Rock Mountain, killed its pilot and navigator. A monument to the fallen British airmen, the Royal Air Force AT6 Monument, stands at the other crash site on Big Mountain.
