= Toiyabe Range =

Mountain range in Nevada, United States

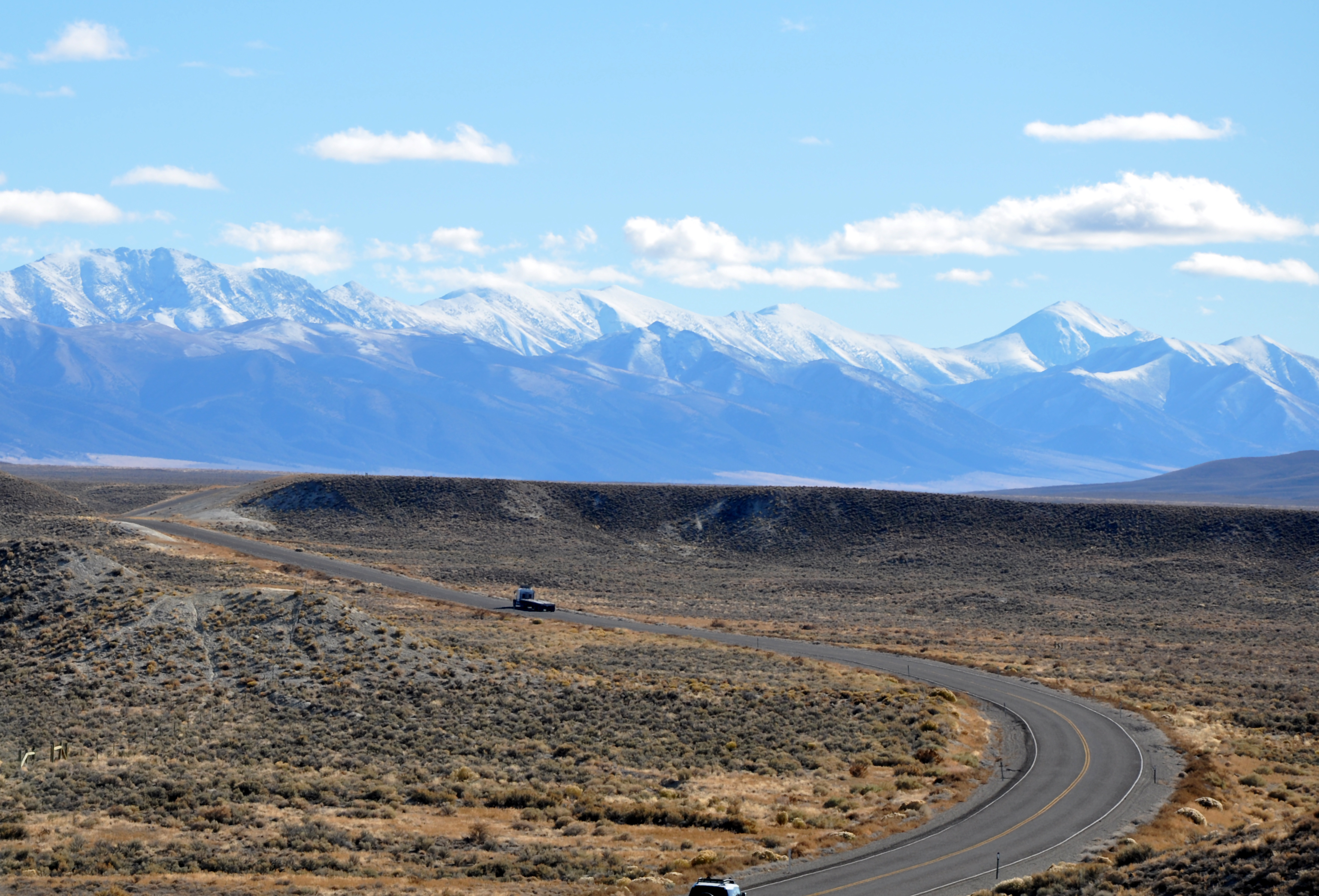
- Looking southeast from above State Route 305 north of Austin

Highest point
- Peak: Arc Dome
- Elevation: 11,778 ft (3,590 m)
- Coordinates: 38°49′57″N 117°21′10″W

Geography
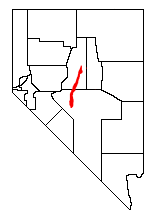
- Location of Toiyabe Range in Nevada
- Country: United States
- State: Nevada
- Region: Central Basin and Range ecoregion
- District(s): Lander and Nye counties
- Range coordinates: 39°59′59″N 116°43′03″W

The Toiyabe Range is a mountain range in Lander and Nye counties, Nevada, United States. Most of the range is included within the Humboldt-Toiyabe National Forest. The highest point in the range, near its southern end, is Arc Dome (11,788 feet, 3592 m), an area protected as the Arc Dome Wilderness. The highest point in Lander County, Bunker Hill, is also located within the Toiyabe Range. The range starts in northwestern Nye County north of Tonopah, Nevada and runs approximately 120 miles (190 km) north-northeast into southern Lander County, making it the second longest range in the state.

== Geography ==
Although the Toiyabe Range is in the rain shadow of the higher Sierra Nevada (U.S.) range to the west and is too arid to support forests except for scattered pines, the climate was cold and snowy enough during the Pleistocene to develop alpine glaciers in several places, with cirques, moraines, and other glacial features still apparent. There are numerous hiking routes in the Toiyabes, including one along the crest.

The Toiyabe Range is separated from the Shoshone Mountains to the west by the Reese River Valley, although they intermingle at their southern extremes. On the east the Toiyabe Range is separated from the Toquima Range by the Big Smoky Valley.

The historic mining community of Austin is located on the western slope of the Toiyabe Range, about midway along its length. U.S. Route 50, the "Loneliest Highway in America", runs through Austin and then crosses the range at Austin Summit at an elevation of 7,484 feet (2,281 m). U.S. Route 6 passes to the south of the range between Tonopah and Ely.

== Humboldt-Toiyabe National Forest ==
The Toiyabe Range is in the Austin Ranger District of the Humboldt-Toiyabe National Forest

=== Toiyabe Crest Trail ===
The National Recreation Toiyabe Crest Trail runs through the Humboldt-Toiyabe National Forest in the Toiyabe Range, consisting of over 70 miles (110 km) of trail atop the ridge, 30 miles (48 km) of which travel through the Arc Dome Wilderness. The Army Corps of Engineers constructed the trail and its many "feeder" trails in the 1930s. It travels through one of the longest roadless areas in the state, and sits atop the longest mountain range in Nevada at over 120 miles (190 km) long. It is the longest continuous maintained trail in Nevada.

==== Trailheads ====
Its northern terminus, with an elevation of approximately 7,500 feet (2,300 m), is the trailhead on Kingston Creek Road and its southern terminus, with an elevation of approximately 6,100 feet (1,900 m) is the trailhead on Twin River Road (Forest route 080); both of which are roads off SR 376.
