= Round Mountain, Nevada =

Unincorporated community in Nevada, US

Coordinates: 38°42′36″N 117°03′58″W

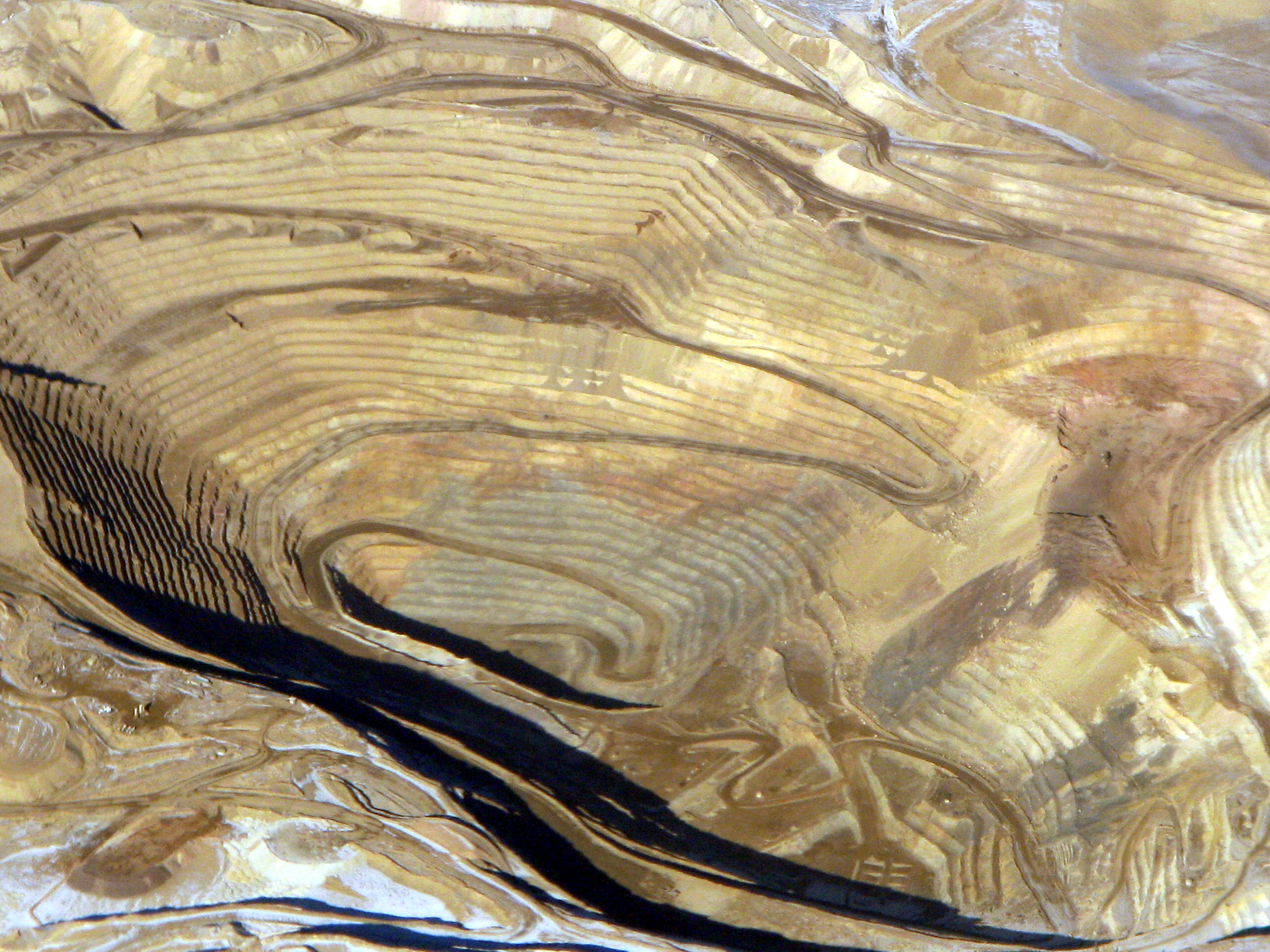
Aerial photo of Round Mountain open pit, 2008. Dimensions of the pit are about 2,500 m × 1,500 m (8,200 ft × 4,900 ft). Mining benches (the "contour lines") are about 10.7 m (35 ft) high.

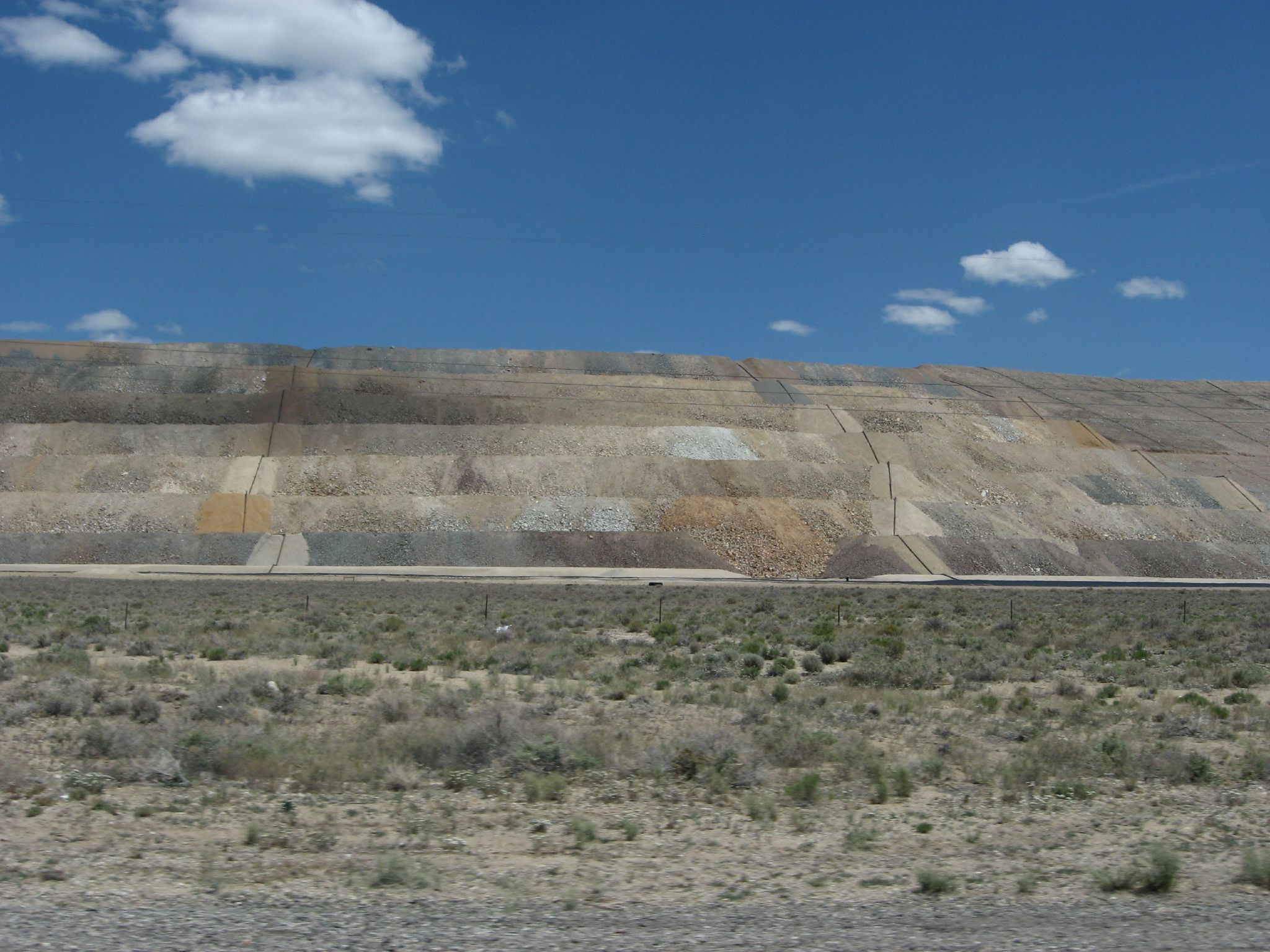
Round Mountain gold mine, heap-leach pads, 2008

Round Mountain is an unincorporated town in Nye County, Nevada, United States. The population of Round Mountain as of 2014 is 1,868. The town's ZIP code is 89045.

Round Mountain is best known for the Round Mountain Gold Mine, a large open pit heap-leach gold mine owned by Kinross Gold Corporation. The first gold production from the Round Mountain District was in 1906, and by 2006 the mine had produced over 10 million ounces of gold, worth about US$9.5 billion at 2009 prices. Ore reserves and resources total about 1.8 million ounces of gold as of the end of 2007. The gold occurs on the rim of an ancient collapsed caldera and is mainly fine-grained, with visible (and sometimes spectacular) gold occurring in structural intersections.

While the original town of Round Mountain remains near the current mining operation, the construction of Hadley served, in essence, as a relocation of the former community. As such, and with the new town existing as of, by, and for Round Mountain Gold, the surrounding areas, including both towns (occasionally including the town of Carvers as well), are often generically referred to as Round Mountain.

== Neighborhoods ==
=== Hadley subdivision ===
Hadley has an elementary school, a high school, a football field, a library, an indoor swimming pool, a golf course, three baseball fields, a fitness trail around the gym and baseball fields, a post office, a grocery store, two gym facilities (one with a weight room, treadmill room, and two racquetball courts), a recreational park, a gas station/laundromat, a bed & breakfast, a few churches, a fishing pond, two tennis courts, a community center, a fire department, an E.M.S, a RV park, storage units, a nail salon, horse corrals, a restaurant/bar, and many children's playgrounds.

=== Carvers area ===
Carvers has a gas station, a motel, storage units, a church, a rest stop, a restaurant/bar, a RV park, a roping arena, a museum, a hardware store, an auto parts store, a tire repair shop, a hair salon, and a small apartment complex.

== Public services ==
The Round Mountain Volunteer Fire Department has one fire station located in Hadley, with one paid position and 23 volunteer firefighters. Round Mountain also has a volunteer emergency medical service, The Smoky Valley E.M.S.

Round Mountain Public Library is affiliated with the library system that serves Round Mountain. Its collection contains 35,000 volumes, and it circulates 39,759 items per year. The library serves a population of 1,868 residents. The Smoky Valley Library District (Round Mountain Public Library) is the only four-star and above library in the state (out of a five-star rating), based on the LJ index of 2013.

== Education ==
Round Mountain Jr./Sr. High School houses students grades 6 through 12. The school mascot is the Knight, and the school colors are black, white, and silver. Round Mountain Elementary School houses students in kindergarten through grade 5. The school mascot is the Squire. The Jr./Sr. high school offers football, volleyball, wrestling, boys' & girls' basketball, track & field, softball, baseball, and boys' & girls' golf. Round Mountain Jr./Sr. high school offers cheerleading, drill team, FBLA, FFA, National Honor Society, Science Club, Student Council, and Academic Olympics.

== History ==
=== Mining ===
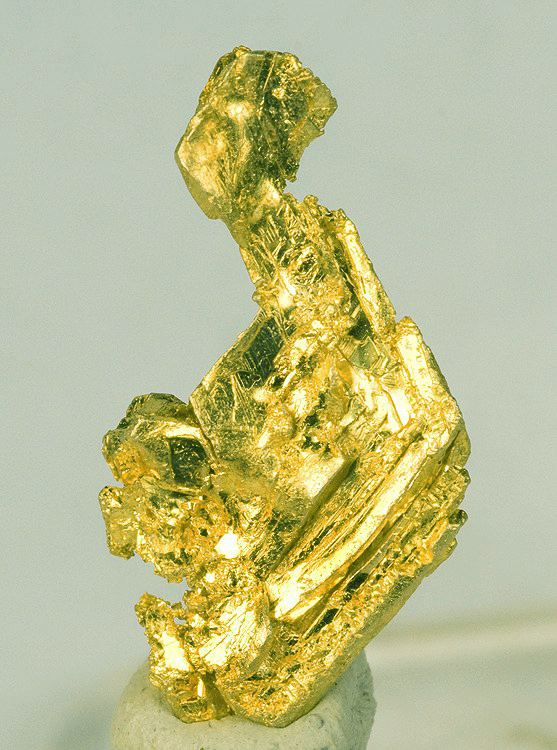
Crystalline gold specimen from Round Mountain Mine

Gold was discovered in 1905 and the town of Round Mountain was established in 1906. The town started as an underground lode mining venture, which continued up to 1935. Surface mining with earth moving equipment lasted until 1940. In 1950 placer mining was done, with a dry land washing plant operating until 1957. Much hydraulic mining was done. Total district production was over $8 million. Some people still lived there in 1965 to 1969.

Gold was discovered at Round Mountain in 1905, but it was not until the following year that more substantial discoveries aroused interest in the area. High-grade gold ore was discovered on a hill known as Round Mountain. By mid-year, the population was close to 400. A number of major mining companies became active in the area and soon the town was given the name of Round Mountain. By 1907, there were daily stages running from Round Mountain to Tonopah. The town contained many wood structures containing mercantiles, saloons, brokerage agencies, a school and a library. In 1906, the first two mining companies to begin operations were the Round Mountain Mining Company and the Fairview Round Mountain Mines Company. The value of the ore produced by the Round Mountain Company during the first ten years (1906 to 1916) was a little over $3 million. By the beginning of 1909 there were six mills operating in the district. Businesses included hotels, general stores, banks, restaurants, lodging houses, a school, a library, and a hospital. By 1939 the town's population was still only 234. The value of total production through 1940 was $7.8 million. New surface operations on the side of Round Mountain began in 1970 and continue to this day.

=== Historic school ===
The Round Mountain School was built in 1936 with two teachers and children from first through twelfth grade housed within its walls. The school was used until the mid-1990s, when Karl W. Berg relocated it and turned it into the Sunnyside Museum.
