= Carvers, Nevada =

Unincorporated community in Nevada, United States

- Unincorporated community
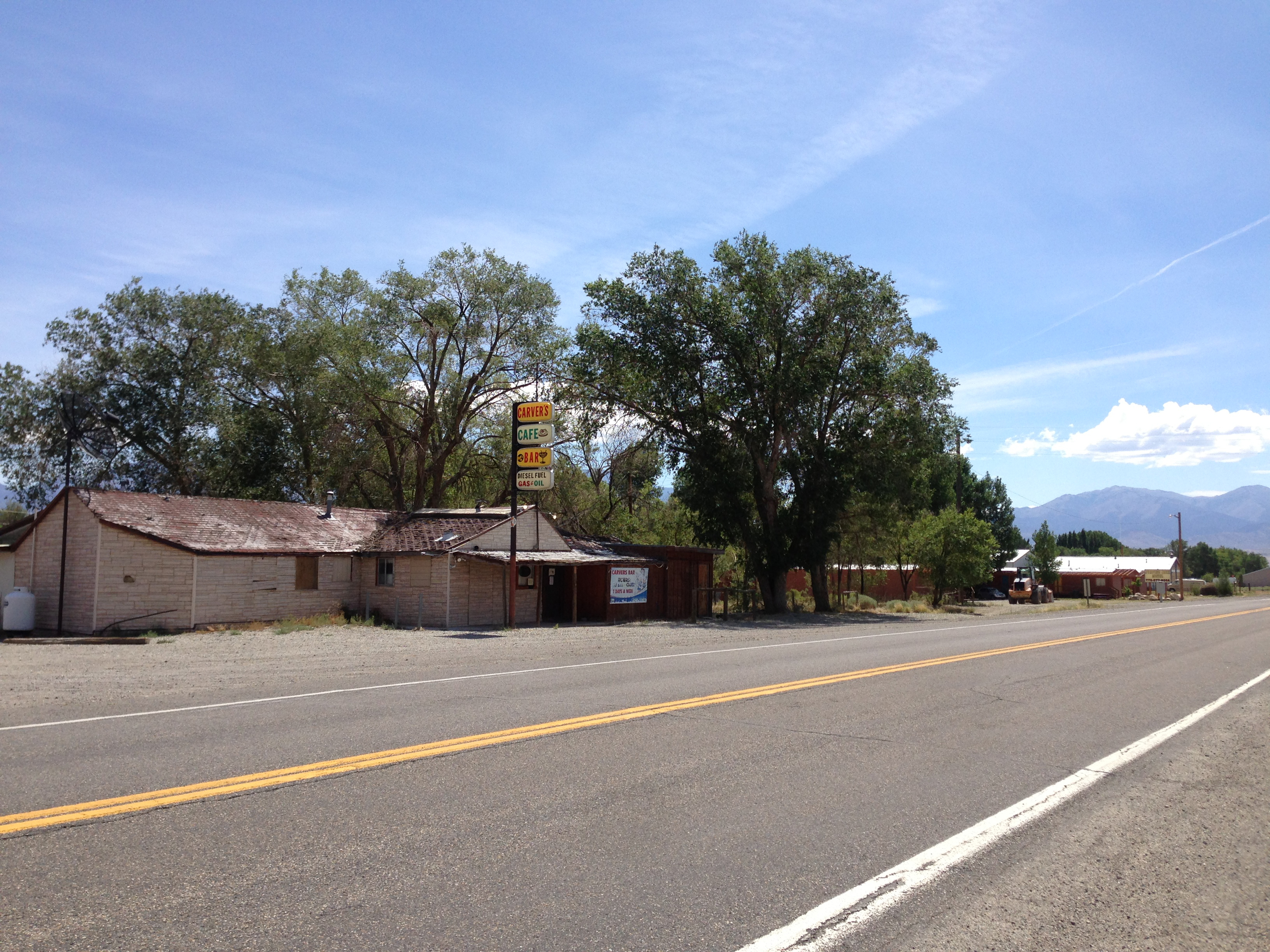
- Businesses on SR 376 in Carvers

- Location within Nevada
- Coordinates: 38°47′12″N 117°10′45″W
- Country: United States
- State: Nevada
- County: Nye
- Elevation: 5,643 ft (1,720 m)
- Time zone: UTC-8 (Pacific (PST))
  - Summer (DST): UTC-7 (PDT)
- Area code: 775
- GNIS feature ID: 859166

Carvers (also known as Carvers Station) is an unincorporated community in Nye County, Nevada, United States. Its elevation is 5,643 feet (1,720 m). Carvers is the northernmost of the three settlements that make up the Big Smoky Valley's Round Mountain mining region. Its zip code is 89045.

== Demographic profile ==
Carvers has a diverse demographic profile with key characteristics. The average household size in Carvers is 2.58 people, likely reflecting both single-occupant homes and small family units. The population is majorly male-dominated, with 52.1% of the population being male and 47.9% female.

The median age of the population is 35.3 years, which suggests that Carvers has a relatively young adult population, with a balance of middle-aged individuals. When broken down by gender, males have a median age of 37.1, while females are slightly younger, with a median age of 32.0. This indicates that the male population tends to be older than the female population on average.

In terms of racial and ethnic composition, the population is predominantly white, making up 91.1% of residents. Hispanics account for 12.2%, representing the largest minority group. Other racial groups include 5.4% identifying as "Other," 4.3% Indian, 1.5% Asian, 0.8% Black, and 0.1% Hawaiian.

== History ==
Carvers was founded by Gerald and Jean Carver. Gerald Carver came to Smoky Valley, Nevada in 1939 and purchased a 300-acre ranch. He later added 640 acres purchased from Mimosa Pittman, widow of Senator Key Pittman. When work began in 1947 on route 8A (now Nevada Route 376) it cut across a corner of their property and the Carvers decided to open a cafe and bar to take advantage of the increased traffic. The Rainbow Ranch Bar and Café opened in April 1948 and was renamed Carvers Station soon after.

== Climate ==
Climate data for Carvers, Nevada (1991–2020 normals, extremes 1949–present)
Month	Jan	Feb	Mar	Apr	May	Jun	Jul	Aug	Sep	Oct	Nov	Dec	Year
Record high °F (°C)	67 (19)	76 (24)	84 (29)	88 (31)	96 (36)	102 (39)	103 (39)	101 (38)	102 (39)	98 (37)	81 (27)	68 (20)	103 (39)
Mean daily maximum °F (°C)	42.4 (5.8)	48.0 (8.9)	56.4 (13.6)	62.7 (17.1)	72.4 (22.4)	83.5 (28.6)	91.2 (32.9)	89.5 (31.9)	81.1 (27.3)	68.3 (20.2)	54.0 (12.2)	42.2 (5.7)	66.0 (18.9)
Daily mean °F (°C)	29.7 (−1.3)	34.4 (1.3)	41.7 (5.4)	47.1 (8.4)	56.1 (13.4)	65.5 (18.6)	73.3 (22.9)	71.3 (21.8)	62.7 (17.1)	50.8 (10.4)	38.7 (3.7)	29.2 (−1.6)	50.0 (10.0)
Mean daily minimum °F (°C)	16.9 (−8.4)	20.8 (−6.2)	27.0 (−2.8)	31.6 (−0.2)	39.7 (4.3)	47.5 (8.6)	55.4 (13.0)	53.1 (11.7)	44.4 (6.9)	33.3 (0.7)	23.4 (−4.8)	16.1 (−8.8)	34.1 (1.2)
Record low °F (°C)	−20 (−29)	−12 (−24)	−8 (−22)	6 (−14)	14 (−10)	19 (−7)	28 (−2)	26 (−3)	19 (−7)	2 (−17)	−5 (−21)	−31 (−35)	−31 (−35)
Average precipitation inches (mm)	0.68 (17)	0.49 (12)	0.61 (15)	0.46 (12)	0.56 (14)	0.37 (9.4)	0.56 (14)	0.52 (13)	0.44 (11)	0.65 (17)	0.50 (13)	0.58 (15)	6.42 (163)
Average snowfall inches (cm)	3.9 (9.9)	1.3 (3.3)	0.8 (2.0)	0.8 (2.0)	0.0 (0.0)	0.0 (0.0)	0.0 (0.0)	0.0 (0.0)	0.0 (0.0)	0.0 (0.0)	0.8 (2.0)	2.0 (5.1)	9.6 (24)
Average precipitation days (≥ 0.01 in)	4.6	4.3	4.3	3.9	4.4	2.7	2.7	2.2	2.4	3.0	2.8	4.0	41.3
Average snowy days (≥ 0.1 in)	1.4	0.8	0.7	0.3	0.0	0.0	0.0	0.0	0.0	0.0	0.5	1.5	5.2
Source: NOAA

== Trails ==
The community lies along the route of the American Discovery Trail.
