= Duckwater Valley =

Valley in Nye County, Nevada, United States

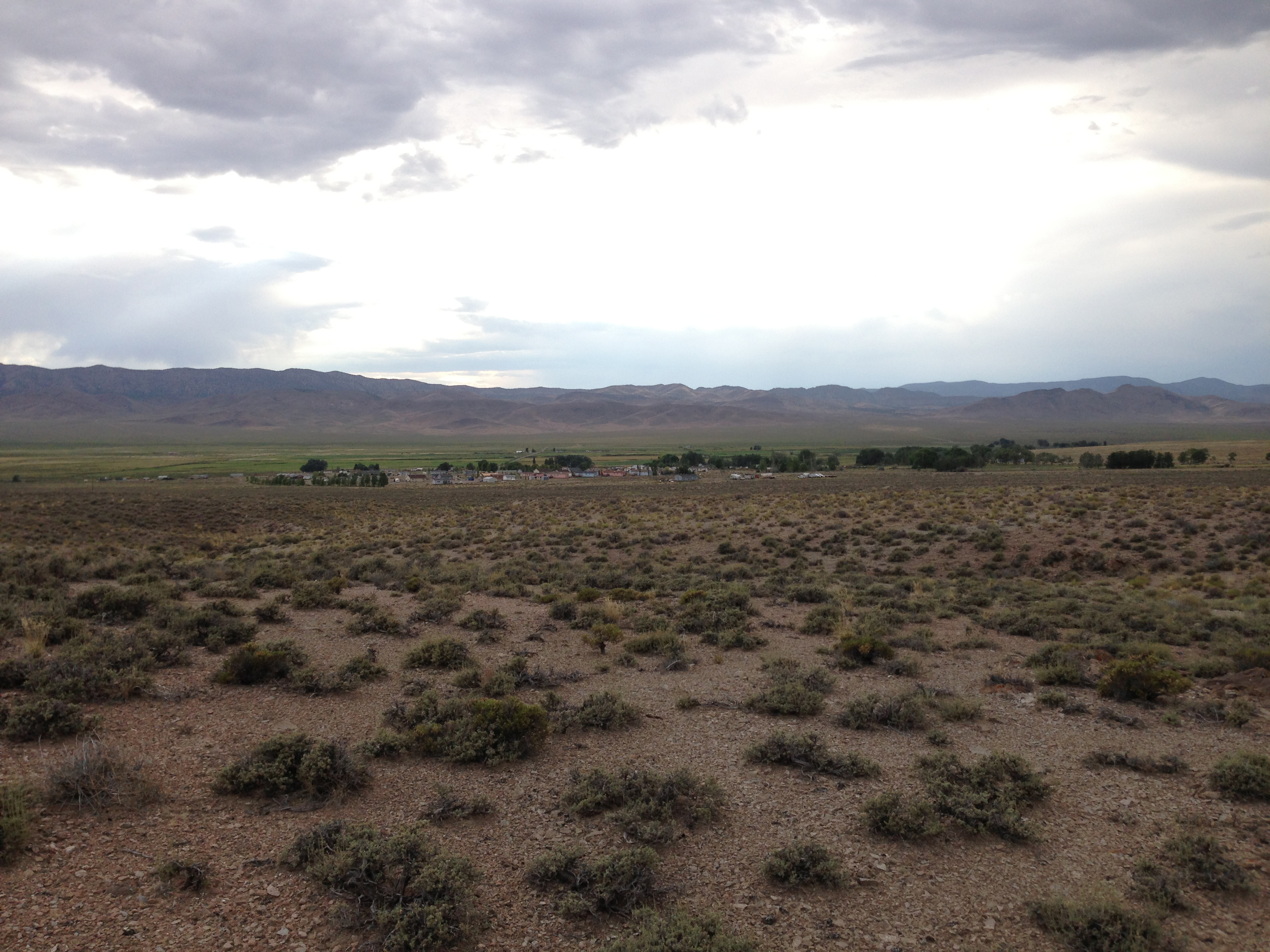
- The basin with the village Duckwater and in the background the Pancake Range, seen from SR 379

- Location within Nevada
- Floor elevation: 5,495 feet (1,675 m)
- Length: 12 miles (19 km) North-south

Geography
- Location: Location of the Duckwater Valley in Nevada
- Population centers: Duckwater
- Borders on: Pancake Range (west) and Duckwater Hills (east)
- Coordinates: 38°57′N 115°42′W
- Traversed by: Duckwater Creek
- Interactive map of Duckwater Valley

Duckwater Valley is a valley in Nye County, Nevada. It starts south of the northern border of Nye County, and runs south for a distance of approximately 12 miles (19 km) to Railroad Valley. The Duckwater Valley is enclosed by the Pancake Range in the west and by the Duckwater Hills in the east. The Duckwater Creek crosses the valley. State Route 379 goes partially through the Duckwater Valley as well. The only populated place in the valley is Duckwater. Part of the valley is occupied by the Duckwater Reservation.

== History ==
The valley had been inhabited for a long time by Native Americans, when the first white Americans settled in the Duckwater Valley in the 1860s after silver ore was discovered in nearby Hamilton. Agriculture arose in the valley, and for years hay, grain, vegetables, and fruit were grown for the inhabitants of Hamilton. Isaak "Ike" Irwin, who produced hay, was in 1868 the first person to settle in the present-day village Duckwater. When Hamilton was in decline, farmers in the Duckwater Valley started focussing on hay and grain, that they fed to their cattle. According to the 1881 book History of Nevada by Thompson and West, the valley consisted almost entirely of meadows, of which 800 acres (320 ha) was occupied by agricultural lands. That land was used for growing grain and vegetables. Back then, some fruit plants had been planted recently.

Thereafter, the livestock sector gradually grew in the Duckwater Valley, and it became the biggest in the valley. Around 1910, the farmers reduced the size of their cattle, because their rangelands were damaged by flocks of wild sheep in the winter season. In 1913, the Ely Record said the Duckwater Valley was "one of the most extensive ranching and farming sections in Eastern Nevada." The newspaper wrote that there were a number of ranches, one of which with 1,000 acres (400 ha) of land, of which 600 acres (240 ha) were in cultivation. Those ranches grew hay, grain, alfalfa, and potatoes, and were grazed by herds of cattle.

The reservation of the Duckwater Shoshone Tribe, that is situated entirely in the Duckwater Valley, has a surface area of over 3,850 acres (1,560 ha), and was officially created in 1940. The idea to establish a reservation had first been raised in 1937 by employees of the Florio Ranch, of which the owner wasn't able to pay the mortgage after he lost all his sheep in a blizzard. They figured they could sell the ranch together with some other ranches to the government for an Indian reservation. After the idea received the support of the Shoshone, the Bureau of Indian Affairs bought two ranches, and thus created the Indian reservation. At its creation, it had a size of 3,240 acres (1,310 ha), but the government has expanded it since by acquiring more ranch lands.
