= Pancake Range =

Mountain range in Nevada, United States

Coordinates: 38°44.5′N 115°51.0′W

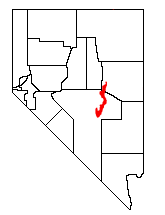
Location of the Pancake Range within Nevada

The Pancake Range is located in east-central Nevada in the United States. The range extends as an irregular sinuous line for approximately 90 miles (140 km) with a roughly north-south trend (N 10 E) in Nye and White Pine counties. The range reaches an elevation of 9,240 feet (2,820 m) at Portuguese Mountain. Neighboring ranges include the White Pine, Grant and Quinn Canyon ranges across Railroad Valley on the east-southeast; and Park and Hot Creek ranges across Big Sandy Springs and Hot Creek valleys on the west-northwest. The south end of Newark Valley lies at the extreme north end of the range. The Lunar Crater Volcanic Field lies at the southwestern end of the chain with the Reveille Range to the south.

Ely lies to the east and Eureka lies to the west of the north end of the Pancake Range. US route 50 between these two cities crosses the very north end of the range at Pancake Summit (elevation 6,521 feet (1,988 m)). Further south the community of Duckwater and the Duckwater Indian Reservation lies in the Duckwater Valley portion of Railroad Valley to the east of the range. The unpaved former Nevada route 20/379 crosses the range between Duckwater and Eureka at Red Rock Summit in the southwest corner of White Pine County. U.S. Route 6 crosses the Pancake Range at Sandy Summit north of Lunar Crater between Currant to the east and Warm Springs to the southwest of the range. Nevada route 375, the Extraterrestrial Highway, traverses the valley east from Warm Springs between the Pancake and Reveille ranges.

The Bureau of Land Management manages 99.9% of the 864 square mile (2,238 km^{2}) mountain area. Trees found in the range include: Utah juniper (Juniperus osteosperma), single-leaf pinyon (Pinus monophylla), and Rocky Mountain juniper (Juniperus scopulorum). Mammals found in the Pancake Range include: pronghorn, long-tailed pocket mouse, chisel-toothed kangaroo rat, and the little pocket mouse.

Pancake Range was so named on account of its relatively flat outline.
