= List of mountain ranges named Antelope =

The United States contains a number of mountain ranges named Antelope (or similar):

Name	USGS link	State	County	USGS map	Coordinates	Elevation	
Antelope Ridge		Arizona	Apache	Mexican Water SW	36°45′03″N 109°44′49″W	5,364 ft	1,635 m
Antelope Hills		Arizona	Apache	Boundary Butte	34°11′18″N 109°44′46″W	7,900 ft	2,400 m
Antelope Hills		Arizona	Graham	Sontag Mesa	33°24′17″N 110°19′10″W	4,321 ft	1,317 m
Antelope Hills		Arizona	Pima	Antelope Hills	32°11′53″N 113°16′42″W	1,398 ft	426 m
Antelope Hills		Arizona	Yavapai	Clarkdale	34°50′28″N 112°07′18″W	4,623 ft	1,409 m
Antelope Hills		California	Kern	Blackwells Corner	35°32′07″N 119°48′21″W	728 ft	222 m
Antelope Ridge		Idaho	Clark	Antelope Valley	44°26′33″N 111°49′35″W	6,591 ft	2,009 m
Antelope Ridge		Idaho	Owyhee	Hurry Up Creek	42°43′55″N 116°31′09″W	6,017 ft	1,834 m
Antelope Hills		Minnesota	Lac qui Parle	Gary SE	44°51′12″N 096°16′59″W	1,161 ft	354 m
Antelope Ridge		Montana	Lake	Ravalli	47°19′35″N 114°10′14″W	3,261 ft	994 m
Antelope Range		Nevada	Eureka	Segura Ranch	39°05′48″N 116°15′53″W	9,281 ft	2,829 m
Antelope Range		Nevada	Pershing	Majuba Mountain	40°44′46″N 118°30′00″W	6,165 ft	1,879 m
Antelope Range		Nevada	White Pine	Baldy Peak	39°57′54″N 114°24′03″W	9,088 ft	2,770 m
Antelope Ridge		New Mexico	Grant	Antelope Ridge	32°58′01″N 108°41′39″W	5,695 ft	1,736 m
Antelope Ridge		New Mexico	Lea	Tip Top Wells	32°18′38″N 103°34′48″W	3,704 ft	1,129 m
Antelope Hills		North Dakota	Grant	Brisbane	46°17′50″N 101°26′16″W	2,438 ft	743 m
Antelope Hills		Oklahoma	Roger Mills	Antelope Hills	35°54′15″N 099°53′04″W	2,598 ft	792 m
Antelope Mountain		Oregon	Lake	Antelope Mountain	43°10′15″N 121°19′30″W	6,529 ft	1,990 m
Antelope Mountain		Utah	Millard	Pinnacle Pass NW	38°36′26″N 112°49′20″W	7,230 ft	2,200 m
Antelope Ridge		South Dakota	Custer	Dead Horse Flats	43°47′07″N 103°52′38″W	6,033 ft	1,839 m
Antelope Hills		Texas	Shackelford	Antelope Hills	32°55′52″N 099°23′19″W	1,722 ft	525 m
Antelope Range		Utah	Iron	Silver Peak	37°43′14″N 113°26′06″W	7,146 ft	2,178 m
Antelope Ridge		Utah	Juab	Topaz Mountain East	39°42′30″N 113°03′13″W	5,417 ft	1,651 m
Antelope Ridge		Wyoming	Fremont	Antelope Ridge	43°34′10″N 108°57′17″W	7,611 ft	2,320 m
Antelope Hills		Wyoming	Fremont	Radium Springs	42°22′54″N 108°32′09″W	7,493 ft	2,284 m
