= Reveille Range =

Mountain range in Nye County, Nevada, United States

- Location within Nevada

Highest point
- Elevation: 2,686 m (8,812 ft)
- Coordinates: 37°51.2′N 116°08.2′W

Geography
- Country: United States
- State: Nevada
- District: Nye County
- Range coordinates: 38°3′15″N 116°12′23″W
- Topo map(s): USGS Reveille and Reveille Peak 15 minute quads

The Reveille Range is the Nye County, Nevada mountain range that is the location of the Reveille Range volcanic field. The highest point is Reveille Peak in the southern part of the range with an elevation of 8,812 feet (2,686 m).

The range is approximately 26 miles (42 km) long and 8 miles (13 km) in width and is oriented approximately north south. The Railroad Valley lies to the east and the Reveille Valley to the west. Immediately to the north northeast lies the Pancake Range and the Lunar Crater volcanic field with Lunar Crater National Natural Landmark. The community of Warm Springs and U.S. Route 6 are seven miles west of the north end of the range. Nevada State Route 375, the Extraterrestrial Highway, runs east from Warm Springs through the divide between the Reveilles and the Pancake Range and then south into Railroad Valley past the east side of the range. West of the Reveille Valley lies the Kawich Range and to the east across Railroad Valley lies the Quinn Canyon Range. The restricted Nellis Air Force Range lies to the south.

== Names ==
- Goblin Knobs - Five miles north of Reveille were so named because local tuff weathers into hoodoos and weird knobs.
- Reveille - Mr Fairchild, a member of a prospecting party who was an editor of the Reese River Reveille named the mining district in 1866 to commemorate the newspaper.
