= Hot Creek Range =

Volcanic mountain range in Nevada, US

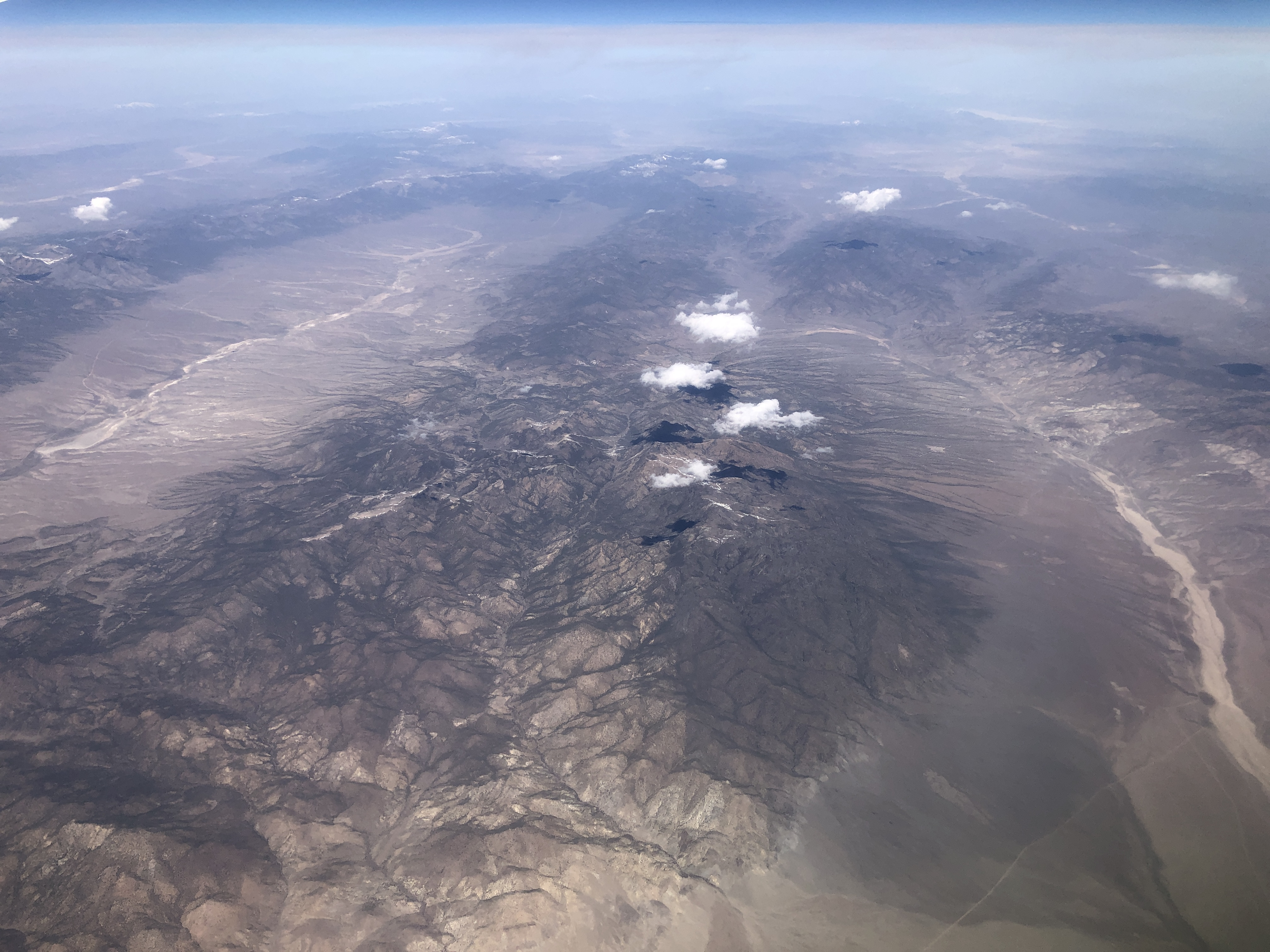
- View of the Hot Creek Range from above to the south

Highest point
- Peak: Morey Peak
- Elevation: 3,123 m (10,246 ft)
- Coordinates: 38°37.66′N 116°17.29′W

Geography
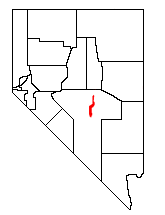
- Location of the Hot Creek Range within Nevada
- Country: United States
- State: Nevada
- District: Nye County
- Range coordinates: 38°35′N 116°23′W
- Topo map: USGS Mount Jefferson 30x60, Warm Springs 30x60

The Hot Creek Range is a volcanic mountain range in Nye County, in central Nevada in the western United States. From the historic community of Warm Springs, the range runs north-northeast for approximately 43 miles (69 km).

To the west are Stone Cabin Valley, Little Fish Lake Valley, and the large Monitor Range. To the east are Hot Creek Valley, Big Sand Springs Valley, and the Lunar Craters Volcanic Field. Further east lies the large Railroad Valley, and the Grant and Quinn Canyon Ranges. Highway 6 passes south of the range at 6,293-foot (1,918-meter) Warm Springs Summit. To the north, the range almost merges with the smaller Antelope and Park Ranges.

The northern section of the Hot Creek Range has two distinct crests. The eastern crest rises to Morey Peak (10,246 feet; 3,123 meters), the highest point of the range. Nearby is the historic silver mining district of Morey. The western crest, across Sixmile Canyon, includes Mahogany Peak (9,825 feet; 2,995 meters), Hot Creek Canyon, and the rugged Fandango Wilderness Study Area.

The range took its name from a nearby hot spring.

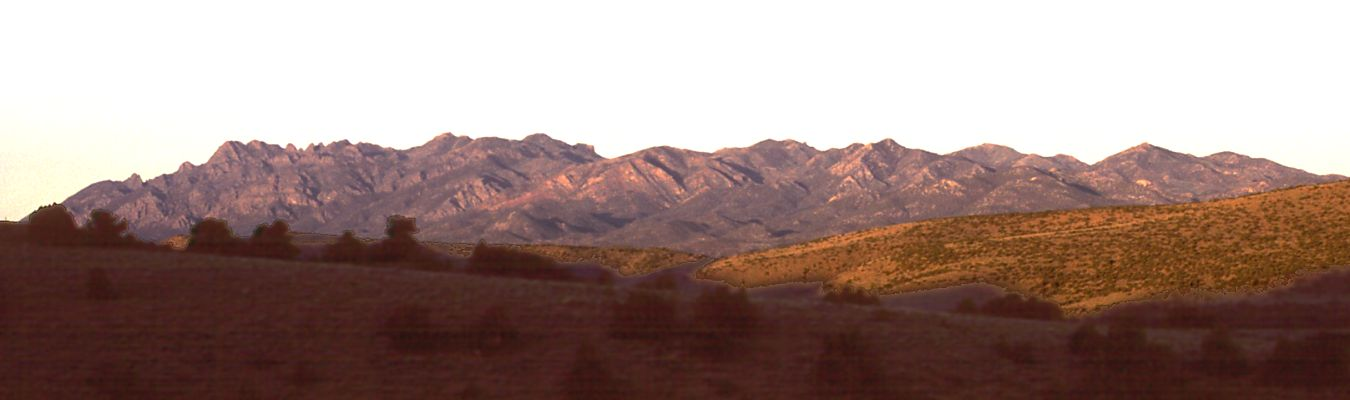
The Hot Creek Range, including Morey Peak, looking southwest at sunrise
