= Nevada State Route 379 =

Highway in Nevada

State Route 379
- Duckwater Road
- SR 379 highlighted in red

Route information
- Maintained by NDOT
- Length: 19.532 mi (31.434 km)
- Existed: 1976–present

Major junctions
- South end: US 6 in Currant
- North end: Duckwater

Location
- Country: United States
- State: Nevada

Highway system
- Nevada State Highway System; Interstate; US; State; Pre‑1976; Scenic
← SR 377	→ US 395

State Route 379 (SR 379) covers Duckwater Road, a 19.532-mile (31.434 km) state highway in Nye County, Nevada, United States. The route serves the Duckwater Indian Reservation, connecting the community of Duckwater to U.S. Route 6 at Currant. The highway was formerly a part of State Route 20 prior to the 1970s.

== Route description ==
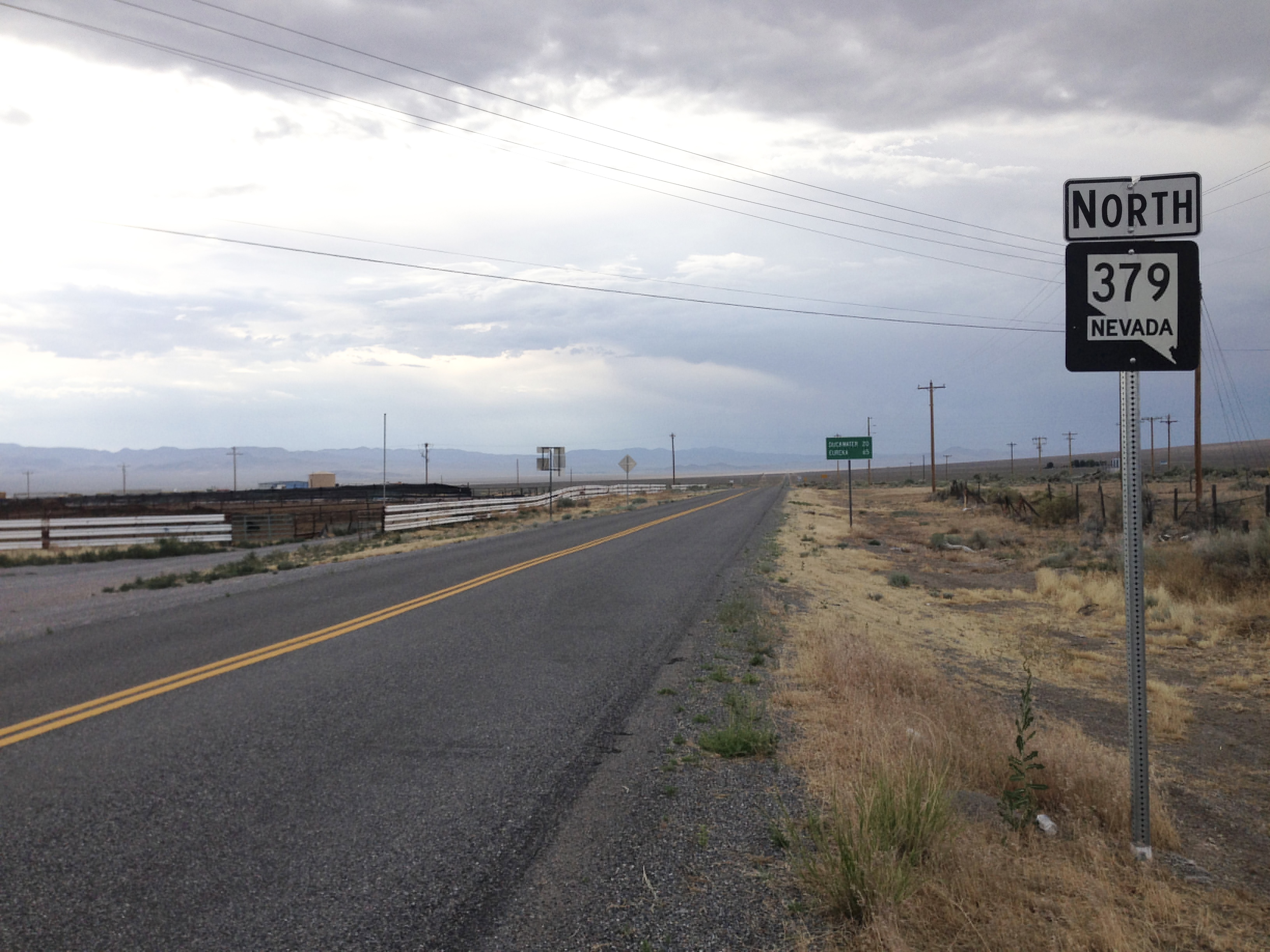
First reassurance sign along northbound SR 379

SR 379 begins in the small town of Currant, located approximately 52 miles (84 km) southwest of Ely. From there, the highway heads northwest about 15 miles (24 km) as it passes through Railroad Valley. Upon meeting the foothills of the Pancake Range, the route curves northward and then turns west again before reaching the town of Duckwater.

== History ==
SR 379 was originally a part of State Route 20.

State maps show a road leading to Duckwater existed as early as 1919, although it was longer and followed a more north–south alignment. The route connected to State Route 4 (now US 6) southwest of Currant at the town of Butler's and proceeded north of Duckwater to a junction with State Route 2 (now US 50) south of Eureka. This road was designated State Route 20 by 1929. In 1941, the southern end of the 57 miles (92 km) route to Duckwater had been graded. This portion of the SR 20 was paved and the remainder of the highway graded by 1956. (Another unimproved road, stretching north from Eureka to Carlin via Blackburn and Palisade, was also designated part of SR 20 in 1929. This northern section would be renumbered to State Route 51 by 1965; it is now State Route 278.)

The highway remained unchanged for several years afterward. In the 1976 renumbering of Nevada's state highways, SR 20 was altered. The paved portion of the road, from US 6 to Duckwater, was reassigned to State Route 379 on July 1, 1976; this change was first seen on state maps in 1978. The unpaved remainder of SR 20 was deleted from the state highway system by 1982.

== Major intersections ==
The entire route is in Nye County.

Location	mi	km	Destinations	Notes
Currant	0.00	0.00	US 6 – Ely, Tonopah	Southern terminus
Duckwater	19.53	31.43	Duckwater Road	Continuation beyond northern terminus
1.000 mi = 1.609 km; 1.000 km = 0.621 mi
