= Antelope Hills =

Antelope Hills may refer to several places or geographic features in the US:

== Communities ==
- Antelope Hills, California, Kern County, California
- Antelope Hills, Colorado, Arapahoe County, Bennett, Colorado
- Antelope Hills, Wyoming, Natrona County, Wyoming

== Other uses ==
- One of a list of mountain ranges named Antelope

== See also ==
- Antelope Hill, Arizona
- Angora, Nebraska, also called Antelope Hill
