= Park Range =

Park Range may refer to:

- The Park Range in northern Colorado in the United States
- The Park Range in Nevada in the United States
- The Park Ranges in the Canadian Rockies
