= ECSD =

ECSD may refer to:

- Edmonton Catholic School District in Alberta, Canada
- Elko County School District, Nevada, United States
- Eureka County School District, Nevada, United States
- Escambia County School District in Florida, United States
- Emmetsburg Community School District in Iowa, United States
- Enhanced Circuit Switched Data, mobile data technology
