= Quinn Canyon Wilderness =

Wilderness area in Nevada, United States

- IUCN category Ib (wilderness area)
- Location within the United States Location within Nevada
- Location: Nye County, Nevada USA
- Nearest city: Tonopah, NV
- Coordinates: 38°09′N 115°41′W
- Governing body: U.S. Forest Service

The Quinn Canyon Wilderness is a protected wilderness area in the Quinn Canyon Range of Nye County, in the central section of the state of Nevada in the western United States.

The Quinn Canyon Wilderness covers an area of 26,256 acres (10,625 ha), and is administered by the Humboldt-Toiyabe National Forest. The nearest city is Ely, Nevada which is more than 100 miles (160 km) distant by road. The wilderness is about 12 miles (19 km) long and 4 miles (6.4 km) wide. The wilderness was established by the United States Congress in 1989.

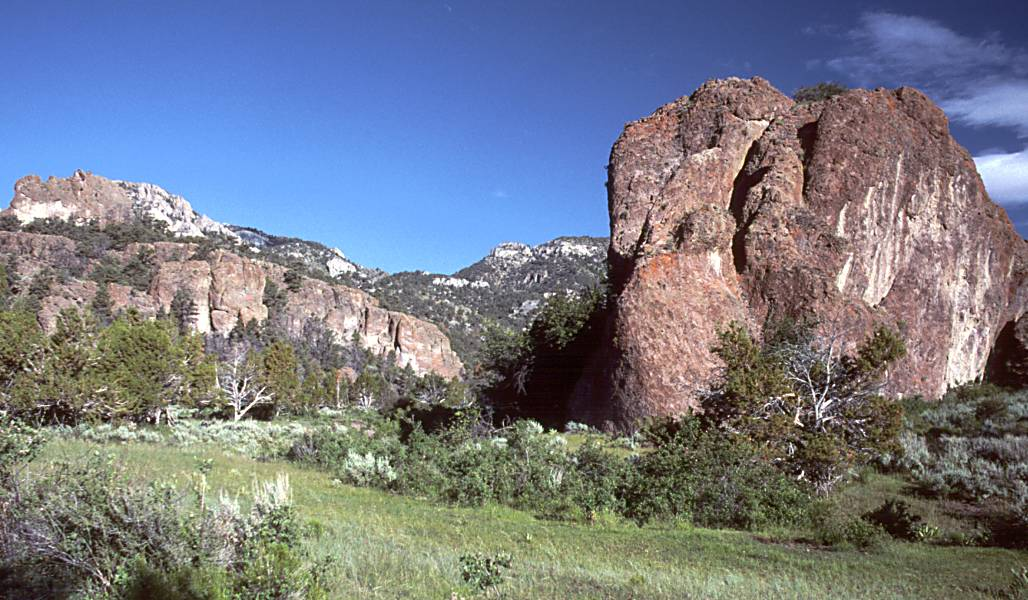
Little Cherry Creek Valley in the Quinn Canyon Wilderness Area

== Description ==
Elevations of the wilderness range from 6,719 feet (2,048 m) at Cherry Creek trailhead to 10,189 feet (3,106 m) at an unnamed high point on the southern edge of the wilderness. The high point is located at 38° 07′ 20″ N and 115° 42′ 31″ W

Wilderness.net described Quinn Canyon Wilderness: "Extreme isolation defines Quinn Canyon, a remote central Nevada wilderness. From the main ridgeline of the area, cresting at more than 10,000 feet, many smaller ridges and narrow canyons extend out east and west. In the Vshaped drainages, snowmelt along with summer rains collect in four year-round streams. Several springs usually provide water. From pinyon pine and juniper, the vegetation gives way to sagebrush with scattered white fir, aspen, and mahogany higher up. Small stands of bristlecone pine can be found here, too. Mule deer move into the higher elevations in summer."

A ten-mile crest of the Quinn Canyon Range is above 9,000 feet (2,700 m) in elevation and is an important summer range for bighorn sheep.

Only a dirt road divides Quinn Canyon Wilderness from the larger Grant Range Wilderness to the north.

== See also ==
- Nevada Wilderness Areas
- List of wilderness areas in Nevada
- List of U.S. Wilderness Areas
- Wilderness Act
