= Lunar Crater volcanic field =

Volcanic field in Nye County, Nevada

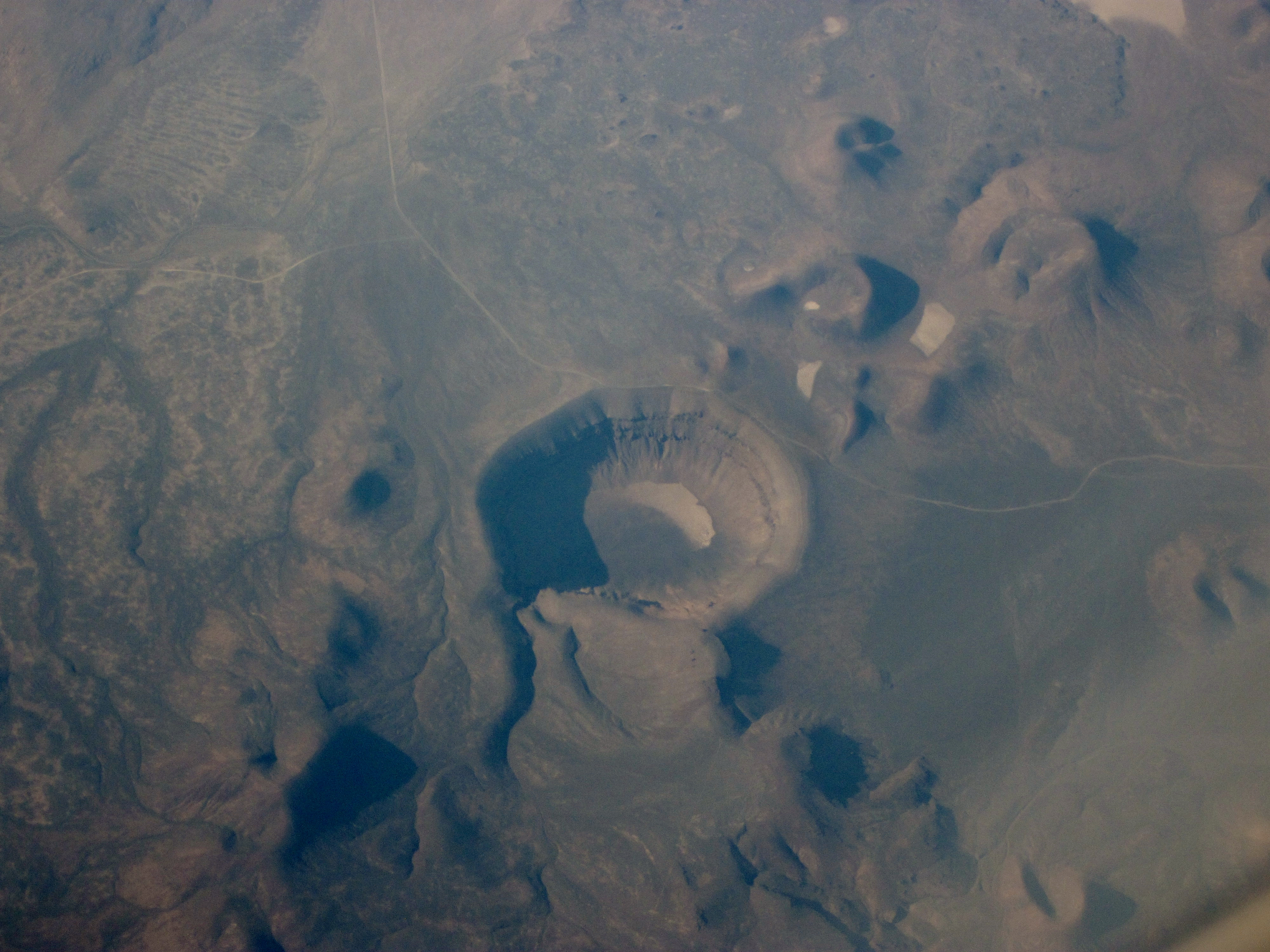
- Aerial view of Lunar Crater and surrounding vents

Highest point
- Elevation: 2,255 m (7,398 ft)
- Coordinates: 38.4°N 116.05°W

Geography
- Location within Nevada

Geology
- Last eruption: 38,100 ± 10,000 years ago

Lunar Crater volcanic field is a volcanic field in Nye County, Nevada, United States. It lies along the Reveille and Pancake Ranges and consists of over 200 vents, mostly small volcanic cones with associated lava flows but also several maars, including one maar named Lunar Crater. Some vents have been eroded so heavily that the structures underneath the volcanoes have been exposed. Lunar Crater itself has been used as a testing ground for Mars rovers and as training ground for astronauts.

The volcanic field has formed on top of older, Oligocene-to-Miocene-age volcanic rocks and calderas, but its own activity commenced only about 6 million years ago. The reasons for the volcanic activity there are not well known. The volcanic field has produced various types of basaltic magma and also trachyte; the most recent eruption was about 38,000 years ago, and renewed activity is possible.

== Etymology and human use ==
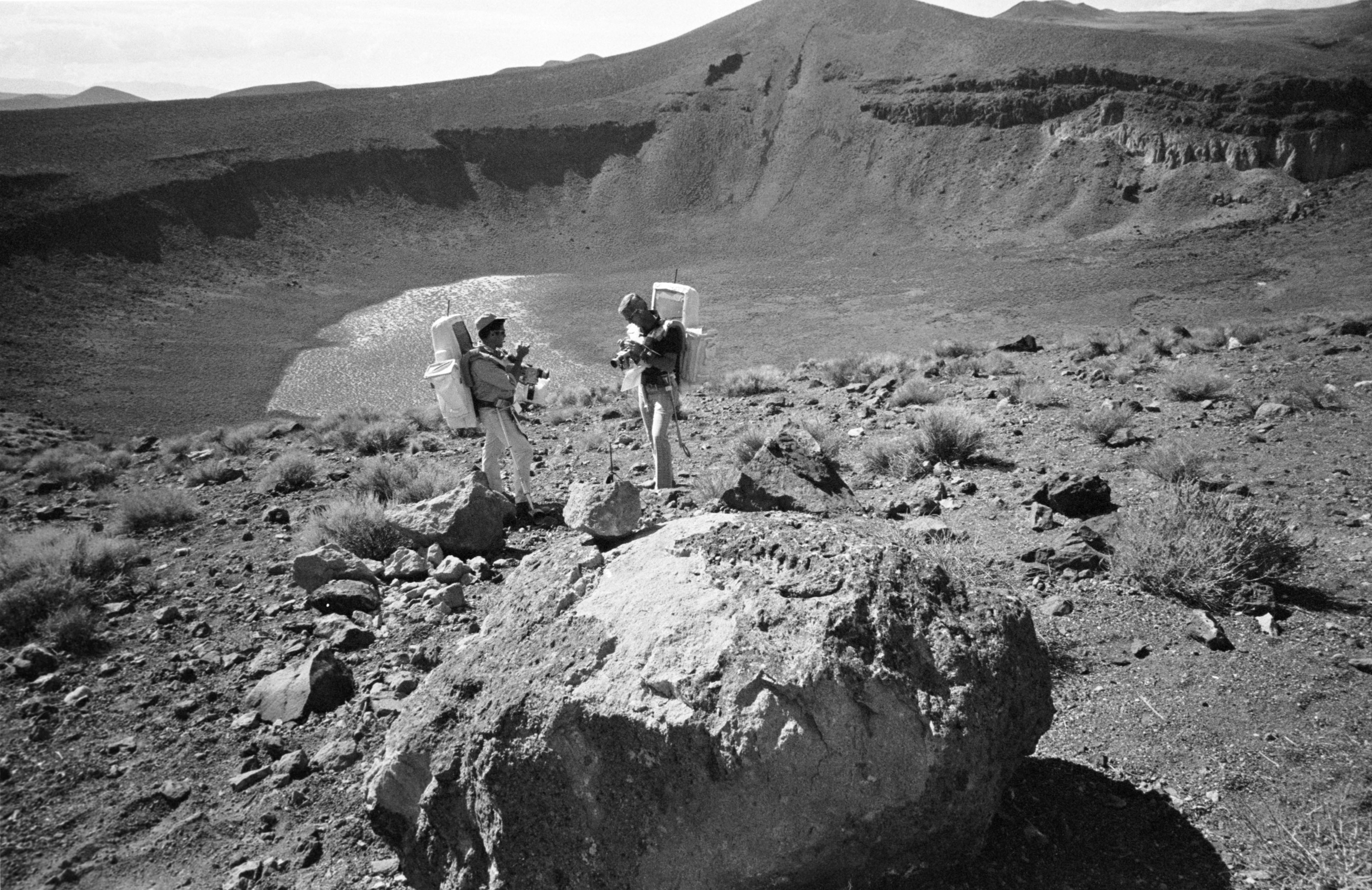
Astronaut training at Lunar Crater

The volcanic field is named after the Lunar Crater vent, the most distinctive vent in the volcanic field. The area is dry and rugged and thus uninhabited. Owing to its diverse geology and accessibility, Lunar Crater volcanic field was used to test prototype Mars rovers and as a training ground for astronauts for the Moon landings. Parts of the volcanic field lie within the Palisade Mesa wilderness study area, and Lunar Crater is classified as a National Natural Landmark, known as Lunar Crater National Natural Landmark.

== Geography and geomorphology ==
The Lunar Crater volcanic field is located in Nye County, in the central part of the state of Nevada. The field lies almost north of Rachel, 62 miles (100 km) east-northeast of Tonopah, and 250 miles (400 km) north of Las Vegas. Two highways run past its western and eastern margins, and both Nevada State Route 375 and U.S. Route 6 pass through the volcanic field; the volcanic field is about halfway between Tonopah and Ely along Route 6, and dirt roads run through the area. A parking place lies at the foot of the Easy Chair crater and another on the rim of Lunar Crater.

The volcanic field covers a 50-mile-long (80 km) and 12.4–6.2-mile-wide (20–10 km) area with a surface of about 390 square miles (1,000 km^{2}). Lunar Crater volcanic field extends in a north-northeast to south-southwest direction along the Reveille Range and Pancake Range and between Railroad Valley to the southeast and Hot Creek Valley/Big Sand Springs Valley/Kawich Valley in the northwest. Over 200 vents (Note: The exact number of vents is not known as many of them are eroded or otherwise degraded and some volcanoes may be buried under sediments in the basins. Older tephra deposits crop out in a quarry.) are located within the field, mostly monogenetic volcanoes with 0.62–6.21-mile-long (1–10 km) aa lava flows along with a few lava domes, dykes, four maars (craters formed by gas or steam explosions), scoria cones, tuff rings, and volcano clusters; cones reach heights of 660 feet (200 m) and widths of 3,900 feet (1,200 m) and often are open on one side, while fissure vents are often associated with elongated ramparts. The vents reach elevations of 1,800–2,100 meters (6,000–7,000 ft). The Hot Creek geothermal field is within 18 kilometers (11 mi) of the Lunar Crater volcanic field but does not appear to have its heat source there.

Erosion has led to topographic inversion at some volcanoes, forming lava-capped mesas (hills with flat tops), broadening and flattening volcanic cones, and has led to the formation of soils and drainage networks especially on older vents; additionally, desert pavement and wind-transported material have accumulated on some lava flows.

The 5.4-square-mile (14 km^{2}) Lunar Lake playa (Note: Dry lake) is located in the northern part of the volcanic field; it lies at 5,740 feet (1,750 m) elevation and collects water from local drainages, which only ephemerally contain water.

=== Individual vents ===
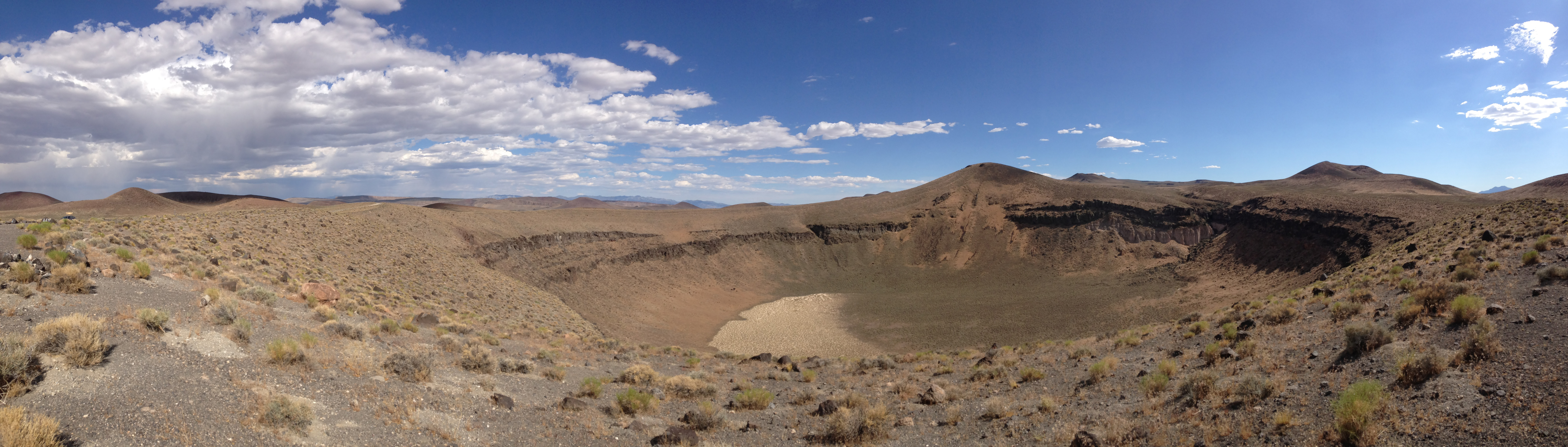
Lunar Crater

Lunar Crater itself is almost circular and embedded in basaltic lavas, underlying tuffs and two older volcanic cones including Lunar Cone. A tephra ring (ring of volcanic material) defines a 3,600-foot-wide (1,100 m) and 430-foot-deep (130 m) crater which is the endpoint of a small canyon that appears to predate the formation of Lunar Crater. An alluvial fan and a playa fill the bottom of the crater, which is the lowest point in this volcanic field, while its margins are surrounded by tephra beds including ash, lapilli, scoria, and tuff blocks; it appears that most of these are older rocks that were torn out of the ground and ejected during the formation of Lunar Crater. Cinder cones are found at Lunar Crater; two vents east and southeast of Lunar Crater are known as North Kidney Butte and South Kidney Butte.

The extremely well-preserved Marcath cone (also known as Black Rock) only a few kilometers north of U.S. Route 6 is an approximately 490-foot-high (150 m) and 1,600-by-3,000-foot-wide (500 by 900 m) volcanic cone, which formed over a fissure vent. Lava flows emanate from its western side, which reach lengths of several kilometers and after bypassing an older cone emerge onto the valley floor. The flows have flow fronts about 16 feet (5 m) high; lobes, inflation structures, and material rafted off the cone appear on the lava flows, which are classified as aa lava. During the eruption of Marcath, tephra was emplaced northeastward for over 3.1 miles (5 km) and is formed by lapilli and scoria; another tephra deposit extends south from Marcath cone. The Marcath cone forms the Marcath unit, the total volume of rocks is about 0.024 cubic miles (0.1 km^{3}).

The eroded Kimana ("butterfly" in Shoshone) volcano is formed by aa lava flows and pyroclastic deposits that cover an area of 10 square miles (26 km^{2}) and have a volume of 0.096 cubic miles (0.4 km^{3}). Broken Cone volcano along with several neighboring bodies likely formed atop a fault (an offset in the ground formed by tectonic movements) and consists of a pyroclastic pile, while the neighboring bodies are remnants of lava flows. There are also dykes, and the volcano may have featured a now-disappeared scoria cone.

Easy Chair is an about 790-foot-high (240 m) and c. 1.6-mile-long (2.5 km) ridge in the Lunar Lake basin. The ridge is formed by pyroclastics emplaced on a fissure vent and partly buried/destroyed by two scoria cones and a maar; the cones in turn are the source of a lava flow field. The total volume of this structure is about 0.024 cubic miles (0.1 km^{3}), without counting a poorly measured tephra deposit.

Bea's Crater just southeast from Marcath volcano is the third maar in the volcanic field and appears to have had a complex history. It formed within a dense cluster of older vents as two overlapping roughly 1,440-foot (440 m) and 3,440-foot-wide (1,050 m) craters with a maximum depth of 482 feet (147 m); at the bottom lies a playa and to its north lies Northeast Cone, which formed together with Bea's Crater. Deposits including lapilli tuffs and possibly older volcanics surround Bea's Crater. The so-called "Middle Maar" is the fourth maar in the volcanic field.

Dark Peak in the Reveille Range is a Pliocene volcano whose underground structure, a dyke (a steep, tabular magma intrusion into rock), is exposed as an almost 0.62-mile-long (1 km) body that also contains the main conduit of the volcano. There are also other traces of dykes that formed when magma propagated away from the vent, and a subdued lava field west from the vents. Erosion has removed most of the volcano, exposing part of the underlying terrain.

== Geology ==
=== Regional ===
Intraplate volcanoes occur in many places of the Western United States, including along the Sierra Nevada, on the Colorado Plateau, the Basin and Range province, and the Rio Grande Rift. Lunar Crater volcanic field lies within the Basin and Range province along with other volcanic fields, but in an unusually central (Note: Recent volcanism in the Basin and Range province usually occurs at the margins of the province where it has migrated to over time.) position. Upwelling of asthenospheric mantle in response to the tectonic regime of the Basin and Range may be responsible for the eruptive activity there, although other processes have also been proposed such as mantle downwelling and compensating flow in the asthenosphere; older volcanism in the region is related to the subduction of the Farallon Plate.

The Basin and Range province has had a complicated geological history and in the last 20 million years features extensional tectonics (tectonic processes involving a dilatation of the crust) represented by normal faults (faults where the downmoving blocks move in a way consistent with gravity). The crust is relatively thin, 19–21 miles (30–33 km), and underpinned by an unusually hot mantle which underneath Lunar Crater volcanic field has a slow seismic velocity. Crustal heat flow is low.

The Lunar Crater volcanic field is part of a larger Pliocene and Pleistocene volcanic zone that extends over the Crater Flat area southward into Death Valley, California; it is known as the "Death Valley–Pancake Range basalt zone". This volcanic zone has received attention due to its proximity and relationship to Yucca Mountain, where a nuclear waste repository is planned, although a relationship between Lunar Crater volcanic field and volcanics close to Yucca Mountain is debatable.

=== Local ===
Older volcanic activity occurred in the field during the Oligocene and Miocene, generating calderas (usually large craters formed by the explosion or collapse of a volcano) such as the Central Nevada Caldera Complex and the Lunar Lake caldera which underlies much of the northern Lunar Crater volcanic field. The volcanism produced ignimbrites, andesitic lavas, and tuffs such as the 24-million-year-old Buckwheat Rim Tuff that Lunar Crater is embedded in; some of these volcanic rocks form structural blocks such as the Citadel Mountain block and the Pancake Range, and others are correlated to ignimbrite sheets elsewhere in Nevada. An early caldera-forming ignimbritic phase was followed by an andesitic lavic phase, and in the last 11 million years, basaltic eruptions have taken place in the Basin and Range.

These older volcanics also form the basement (underground rock surface) in the area, while parts of the region are covered by alluvium (sediment that was transported by water); sometimes the older volcanics are buried beneath this alluvium and playa deposits. In turn, Paleozoic rocks crop out at the northeastern margin of the Lunar Crater volcanic field and underlie the older volcanics. Finally, Proterozoic crystalline rocks occur within the crust. The geology of the region is dominated by fault-separated blocks with only little folding.

Some vents form alignments, and the positions of (not all) individual volcanoes appear to be controlled by normal faults, although isolated volcanoes or clusters also occur and the ascent of magma at many vents was influenced by the general tectonic regime rather than by specific faults. The faults have also influenced the older volcanism and in turn the Lunar Crater volcanic field. Volcanic activity has buried many of the faults in the area, and there is little evidence of ongoing faulting and deformation.

=== Composition ===
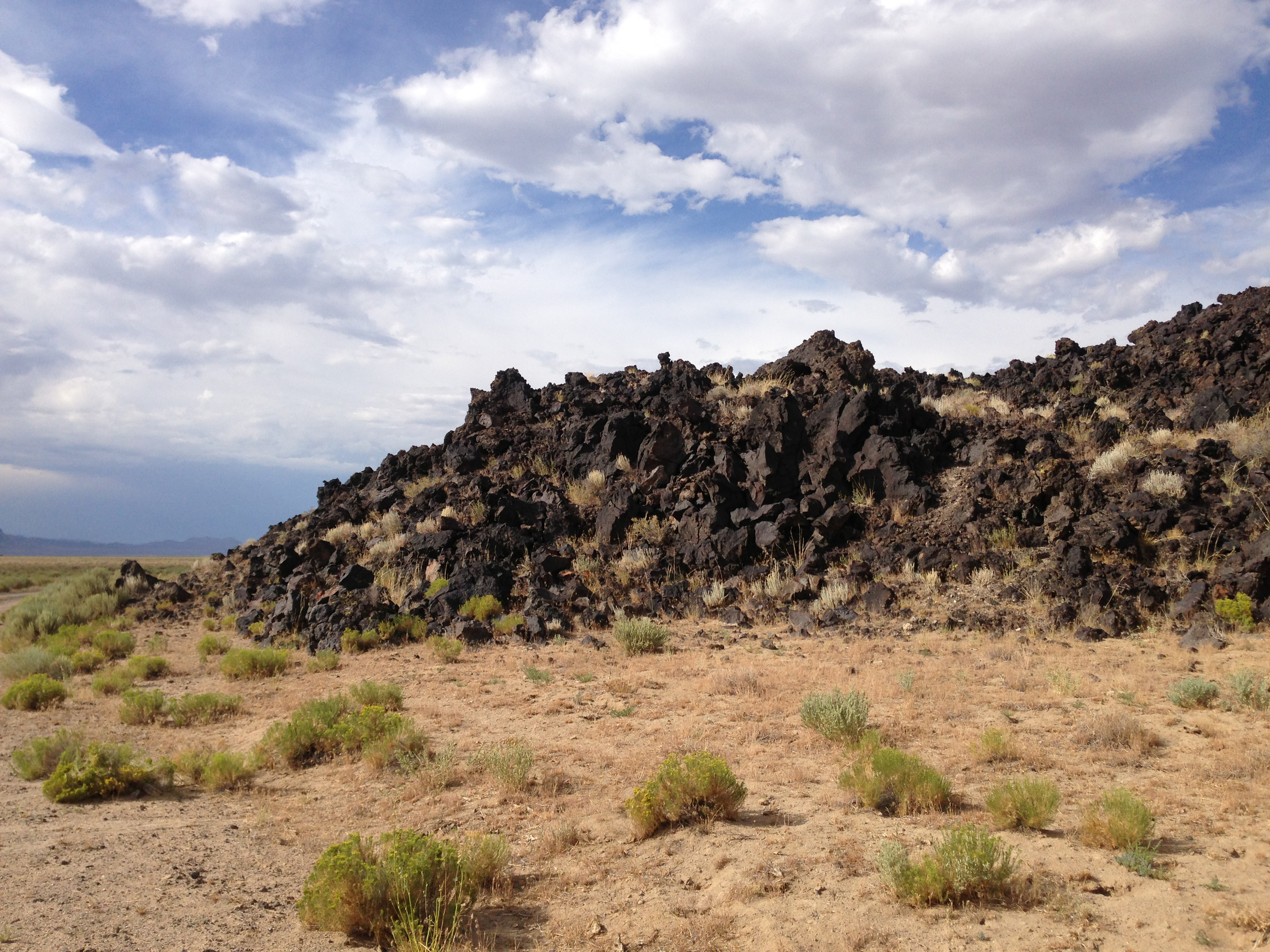
A close-up of the youngest lava flow

The Lunar Crater vents have erupted alkali basalts; trachyte occurs at two lava domes and basalts, basanite, tephrite, and trachybasalt have been reported as well. In general, the volcanic rocks define an ocean island basalt suite that originated in the asthenosphere. The rocks contain phenocrysts, (Note: Phenocrysts include amphibole, clinopyroxene, olivine, plagioclase and sanidine in the trachytes,) inclusions, and nodules. (Note: Inclusions and nodules are formed by clinopyroxenite, dunite, gabbro, harzburgite, lherzolite, peridotite, spinel and wehrlite) Alteration has formed chlorite, epidote, and sericite. In the northern part of the volcanic field, lavas have a porphyritic (with a texture characterized by visible crystals) appearance.

The magma appears to originate from a heterogeneous mantle and ponds and crystallizes underneath and inside the crust but without stalling in long-lived magma chambers, before rapidly rising to the surface. Each volcano was supplied by one batch of magma.

== Climate and vegetation ==
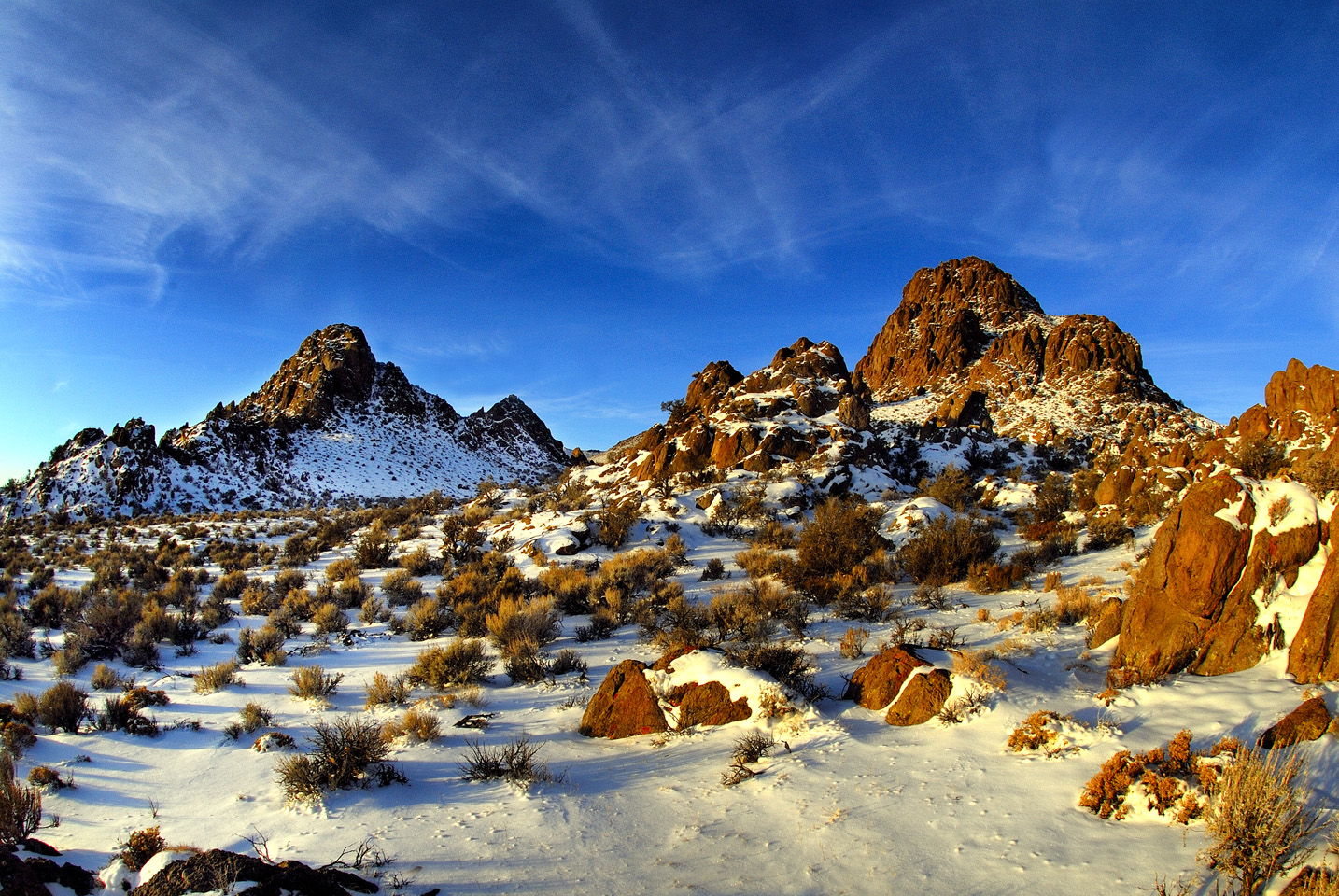
Winter landscape in the Reveille Range

The climate is continental and arid, with annual precipitation of about 4.7 inches (12 cm). Mean temperatures are about 54 °F (12 °C), with maxima and minima of 90 °F (32 °C) and 18 °F (−8 °C) respectively. Vegetation is scarce and consists mostly of sagebrush steppe with bushes like greasewood and saltbrush with grass such as Indian ricegrass underneath. The Lunar Crater is also the type location of the Lunar Crater Howell's-buckwheat, Johanneshowellia crateriorum.

== Eruption history ==
The volcanic field was active in the Miocene/Pliocene and Pleistocene, with the oldest eruptions dated to about 6 million years ago. Volcanism occurred in four stages, with activity peaking every 1–2 million years. The southern volcanics on Reveille Range and in Kawich Valley are the older ones, while more recent eruptions occurred farther north on Pancake Range, although at any given point of time the field was active over a large area. As a consequence of the long duration of volcanism, the various volcanic centers have been eroded at varying degrees while volcanism moved to the north at a rate of about 0.39 inches per year (1 cm/year). A mean magma flux rate of 4.1×10^{−6} cubic miles per year (0.000017 km^{3}/a) has been reported for Lunar Crater volcanic field, with a tendency to decrease over time and change in composition.

Many eruptions in Lunar Crater volcanic field have been dated; aside from radiometric dating, differences in the grade of weathering and erosion have also been used to determine the relative age of volcanic units as older vents are often degraded and buried by soils:

- Kimana is probably about 5.7 ± 0.2 million years old.
- Qc cone was emplaced 1.61 ± 0.14 million years ago.
- The Mizpah unit was emplaced between 740,000 and 620,000 years ago.
- Easy Chair is dated to be 140,000 ± 5,000 years old.
- The Giggle Springs unit was dated to less than 81,000 ± 5,000 years ago.

Lunar Crater's own age is not known; a tephra potentially correlated to it may have been emplaced 600,000 ± 30,000 to 224,000 ± 43,000 years ago. Scarce traces of erosion imply a late Pleistocene age, however, with a more recent age estimate of 190,000 – 72,000 years ago. Bea's Crater is also not directly dated but may be 300,000 – 100,000 years old.

The emplacement of individual vents often began with explosive eruptions that formed mounds, before effusive eruptions (eruptions characterized by the production of lava flows) generated lava flows. The volcanic eruptions had characteristics of Hawaiian or Strombolian eruptions, with maars and tuff rings forming where ascending magma interacted with groundwater and volcanic cones where ejecta from the vent piled up and formed a cone. In some places, several eruptions occurred over timespans of over one million years and gave rise to closely spaced vents. Lava flows were produced at rates of about 35–3,531 cubic feet per second (1–100 m^{3}/s) and at Kimana and Broken Cone probably occurred through lateral vents. The Marcath eruption may have lasted up to 20 days; it probably occurred during southwesterly wind and formed a 3.7–5.0-mile-high (6–8 km) eruption column.

=== Most recent eruption and hazards ===
The most recent eruption occurred 38,000 ± 10,000 years ago and formed the Marcath (or Black Rock) (Note: Formerly it was dated to be 350,000 ± 50,000 years old.) unit. Tephra from the volcanic field is mixed with sediments less than 18,000–9,500 years old, and the Black Rock lava flow was once considered to be of early Holocene age but is now considered to be Pleistocene. In light of the recent activity, future eruptions are possible, and thus the volcanic field could be considered active. Scoria-cone-forming eruptions can be hazardous owing to the ejection of ballistic blocks, generation of lava flows, and tephra which can disrupt air traffic, even though such eruptions are usually of small volume.
