= Adaven, Nevada =

Adaven
- Ghost town
- Location within Nevada
- Coordinates: 38°07′56″N 115°36′01″W
- Country: United States
- County: Nye
- State: Nevada
- Founded: 1890
- Named for: Nevada spelled backwards
- Time zone: UTC-8 (Pacific (PST))
  - Summer (DST): PDT (UTC-7)
- GNIS feature ID: 855945

Adaven is a former mining settlement and ghost town in Nye County, Nevada.

== Geography ==
Adaven is located in the Quinn Canyon Range, located 30 miles north from Rachel.

== History ==
The village was founded in the late 1890s. The post office was named Sharp from 1901 until 1939 when it was renamed Adaven ('Nevada' backwards). In 1953 the post office was closed, and thereafter, the town was abandoned. A few buildings and ranches remained in the early 21st century.

== See also ==
- List of geographic names derived from anagrams and ananyms
