= Grant Range Wilderness =

Protected wilderness area in Nevada

- IUCN category Ib (wilderness area)
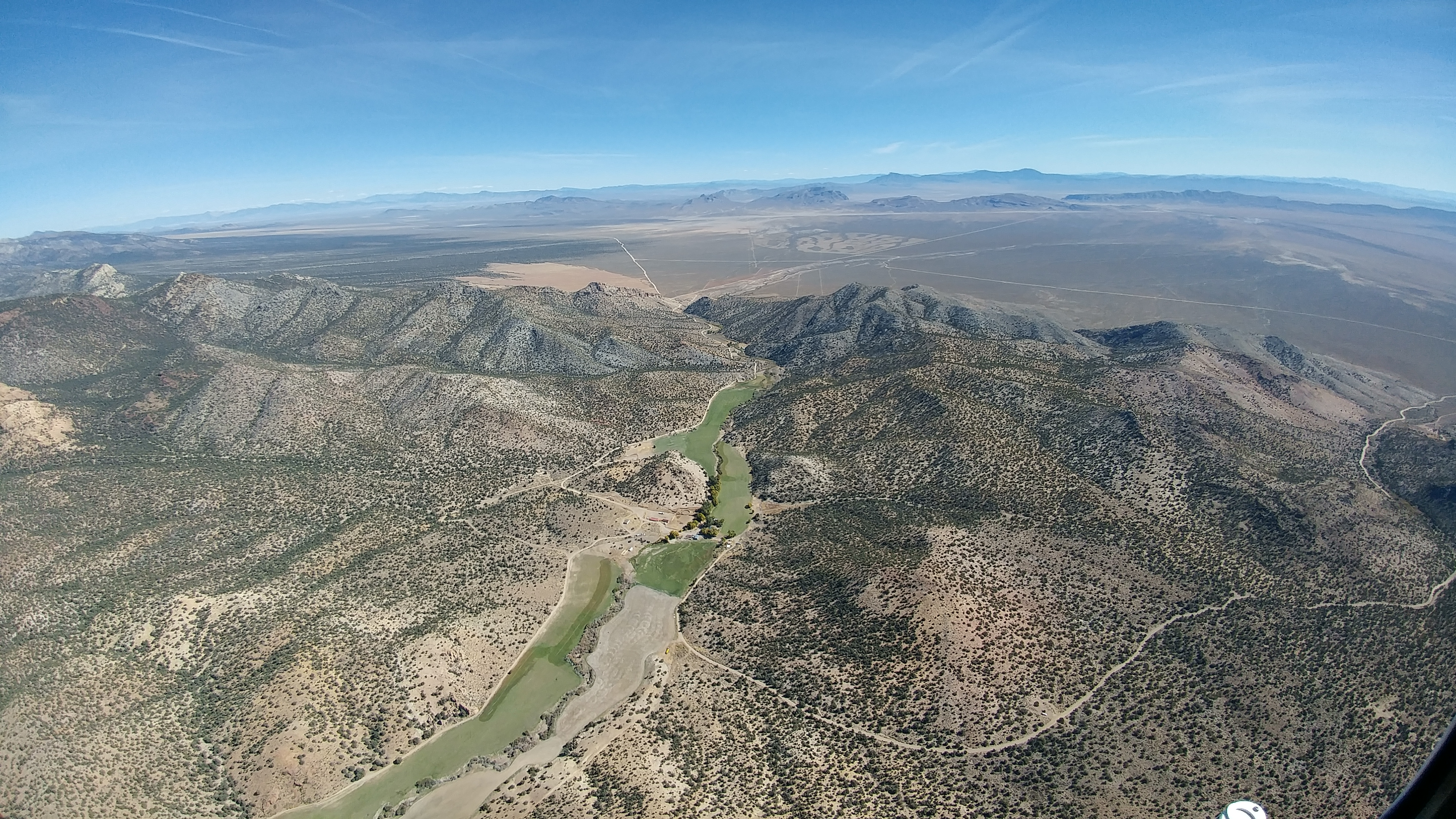
- Aerial view of the area

- Location within the United States
- Location: Nye County, Nevada, U.S.
- Nearest city: Tonopah, NV
- Coordinates: 38°15′08″N 115°30′11″W
- Area: 52,600 acres (21,300 ha)
- Designated: 1989
- Governing body: U.S. Forest Service

The Grant Range Wilderness is a protected wilderness area in the Grant Range of Nye County, in the central section of the state of Nevada in the western United States.

The Grant Range Wilderness encompasses an area of 52,600 acres (21,300 ha), and is administered by the Humboldt-Toiyabe National Forest.

Troy Peak is the highest peak in the wilderness area and the Grant Range with an elevation of 11,298 feet (3,444 m).

Grant Range Wilderness is separated only by a dirt road from the smaller Quinn Canyon Wilderness to the south.

== See also ==
- Nevada Wilderness Areas
- List of wilderness areas in Nevada
