= Antelope Range (Nye County, Nevada) =

Mountain range in Nevada, United States

Antelope Range (Nye County)
- Location within Nevada

Highest point
- Elevation: 3,080 m (10,100 ft)
- Coordinates: 39°8.80′N 116°15.07′W

Dimensions
- Length: 26 mi (42 km) NNE
- Width: 9.3 mi (15.0 km) E - W

Geography
- Country: United States
- State: Nevada
- Districts: Nye County and Eureka County
- Range coordinates: 39°5′47.755″N 116°15′53.229″W
- Topo map: USGS Segura Ranch

The Antelope Range is a mountain range in Nye County, Nevada. A small part of the range extends north into southern Eureka County. The community of Eureka is about 35 km (22 mi) to the northeast of north end of the range.

The Antelope Range is a north-northeast trending linear range with a length of approximately 42 km (26 mi) and a width of about 15 km (9.3 mi). The Monitor Range lies to the west across the Antelope Valley on the northwest and Little Fish Lake Valley on the southwest. Hot Creek Range adjoins the range to the south across Long Canyon. To the east lie the Park Range and Little Smokey Valley with the Fish Creek Range to the northeast.

Highest peaks in the range are Ninemile Peak at 3,080 m (10,100 ft) just south of the Eureka–Nye County line and Moonshine Peak 2,877 m (9,439 ft) about 18.4 km (11.4 mi) to the south. Little Smokey Valley floor 20.7 km (12.9 mi) east of Ninemile Peak is at an elevation of 1,850 m (6,070 ft).

== Geology ==
The Middle Ordovician Whiterock Stage was named for geologic units in the region.

== Climate ==
Snowball Ranch is located on the eastern edge of the Antelope Range.

Climate data for Snowball Ranch, Nevada, 1991–2020 normals, 1966-2020 extremes: 7160ft (2182m)
Month	Jan	Feb	Mar	Apr	May	Jun	Jul	Aug	Sep	Oct	Nov	Dec	Year
Record high °F (°C)	62 (17)	67 (19)	69 (21)	77 (25)	86 (30)	91 (33)	95 (35)	93 (34)	86 (30)	83 (28)	72 (22)	63 (17)	95 (35)
Mean daily maximum °F (°C)	41.7 (5.4)	43.0 (6.1)	51.4 (10.8)	57.1 (13.9)	66.1 (18.9)	76.4 (24.7)	83.4 (28.6)	81.7 (27.6)	74.3 (23.5)	63.2 (17.3)	50.3 (10.2)	41.8 (5.4)	60.9 (16.0)
Daily mean °F (°C)	28.1 (−2.2)	29.9 (−1.2)	37.2 (2.9)	42.1 (5.6)	50.3 (10.2)	58.5 (14.7)	65.9 (18.8)	64.5 (18.1)	57.1 (13.9)	47.1 (8.4)	35.7 (2.1)	28.3 (−2.1)	45.4 (7.4)
Mean daily minimum °F (°C)	14.5 (−9.7)	16.9 (−8.4)	23.0 (−5.0)	27.0 (−2.8)	34.5 (1.4)	40.6 (4.8)	48.3 (9.1)	47.2 (8.4)	40.0 (4.4)	31.1 (−0.5)	21.1 (−6.1)	14.7 (−9.6)	29.9 (−1.2)
Record low °F (°C)	−21 (−29)	−18 (−28)	−12 (−24)	5 (−15)	14 (−10)	21 (−6)	29 (−2)	27 (−3)	17 (−8)	0 (−18)	−9 (−23)	−26 (−32)	−26 (−32)
Average precipitation inches (mm)	0.57 (14)	0.65 (17)	0.84 (21)	0.78 (20)	1.01 (26)	0.56 (14)	0.87 (22)	1.03 (26)	1.41 (36)	0.58 (15)	0.40 (10)	0.41 (10)	9.11 (231)
Average snowfall inches (cm)	12.4 (31)	8.7 (22)	9.9 (25)	5.0 (13)	1.8 (4.6)	0.6 (1.5)	0.0 (0.0)	0.0 (0.0)	0.3 (0.76)	1.8 (4.6)	4.4 (11)	4.1 (10)	49 (123.46)
Source 1: NOAA (1981-2010 snowfall)
Source 2: XMACIS2 (records)
