= Eureka County School District =

School district in Nevada, United States

Eureka County School District (ECSD) is a school district headquartered in Eureka, Nevada. It covers Eureka County.

== History ==
Greg Wieman was the superintendent beginning circa 2014 and ending in 2016. The board of trustees chose not to retain him as superintendent.

Some time prior to 2017, the district began using a four-day per week schedule.

In 2017 its enrollment was below 250. Most students, after completing senior high school, go to the military and/or to post-secondary education. According to superintendent Dan Wold, "everybody knows each other -- most are somehow related" due to the small population.

In November 2022 there were 63 people working for the district, and the district had 330 students.

== Operations ==
The funding of the district comes from taxation from businesses that run mining operations.

== Schools ==
- Eureka County High School
  - As of 1999 it also takes high school students on the Duckwater Indian Reservation, and from Duckwater, Nevada. Families living around Eureka County High School students often house Duckwater students who they are related to while those students go to Eureka County High.
- Eureka Elementary School
- Crescent Valley Elementary School
- Eureka On-Line School
