= Grant Range =

Mountain chain in Nevada, United States

Coordinates: 38°22′22″N 115°30′17″W

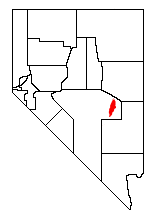
Location of the Grant Range within Nevada

The Grant Range is a mountain chain in east-central Nevada in the western United States. It runs for approximately 30 miles (50 km) in a generally north-south direction in northeastern Nye County. It is located south of the Horse Range and northeast of the closely associated Quinn Canyon Range. To the west is the expansive Railroad Valley and to the east is the White River Valley. The White River Valley drains the eastern slopes of the range into the Colorado River.

The Grant Range mountains cover an area of 346 square miles (896 km²). The Bureau of Land Management manages 60.5% of the area, while the Forest Service oversees 39.3%. Troy Peak is the tallest mountain in the range, reaching 11,298 feet (3443 m) above sea level northwest of Scofield Canyon. The Grant Range is home to the Grant Range Wilderness, administered by the Humboldt–Toiyabe National Forest.

Almost 60% of the area is made up of pinon-juniper vegetation, with sagebrush scrub accounting for about 15% of the range. The mountains are home to at least four species of mice, three species of chipmunks, and three species of snails. Steller's jay and the hairy woodpecker also use the mountains, as well as the Great Basin fence lizard.

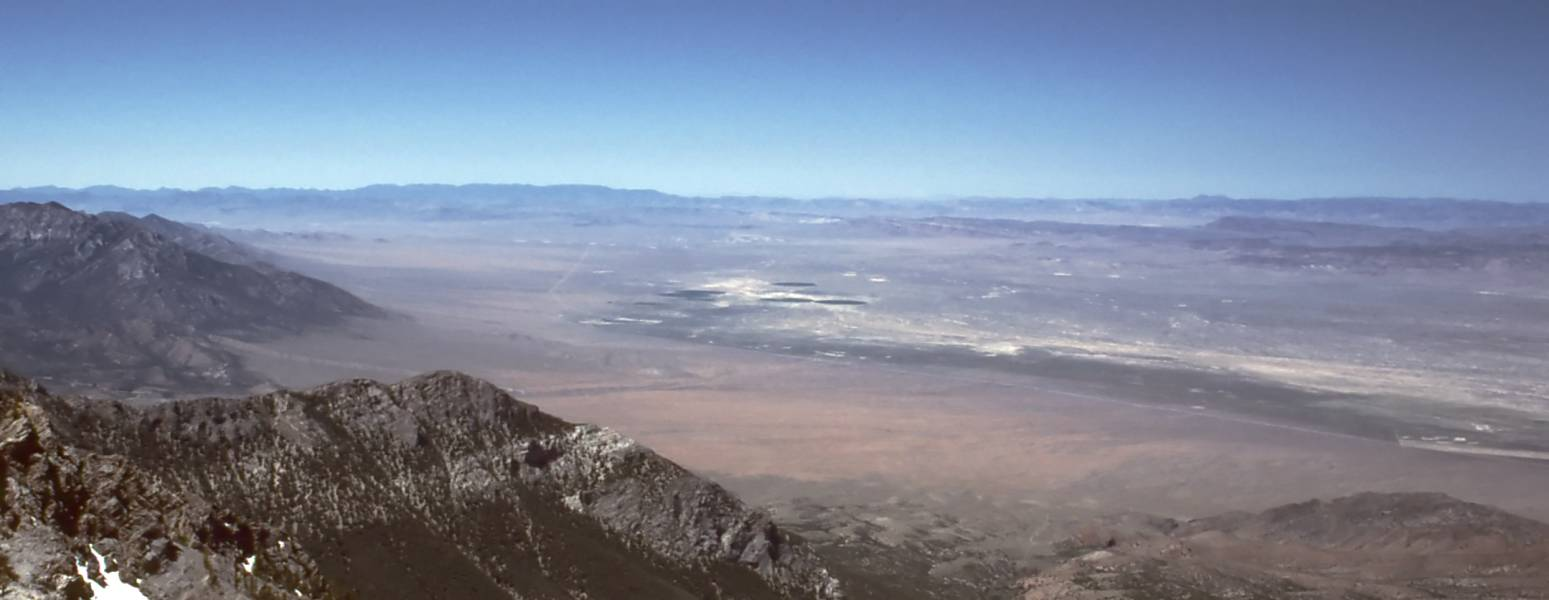
The central portion of Railroad Valley, looking southwest from the summit of Troy Peak
