= Duckwater, Nevada =

Unincorporated community in Nevada, U.S.

Duckwater
- Unincorporated community
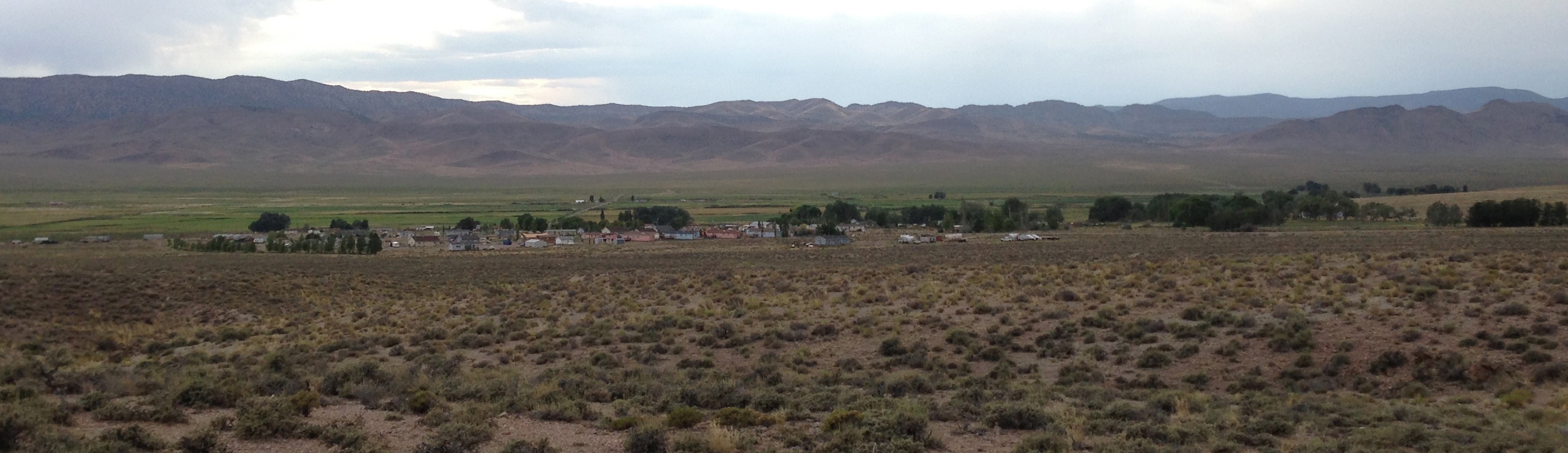

- Location of Duckwater in Nevada
- Coordinates: 38°55′55″N 115°42′54″W
- Country: United States
- State: Nevada
- County: Nye

Area
  - Total: 4,346.4 sq mi (11,257 km^{2})
- Elevation: 5,480 ft (1,670 m)

Population (2010)
  - Total: 228
  - Density: 0.0525/sq mi (0.0203/km^{2})
- Time zone: UTC-8 (Pacific)
  - Summer (DST): UTC-7 (PDT)
- ZIP code: 89314

Duckwater is an unincorporated community located in the central portion of the U.S. state of Nevada, in the Duckwater Valley at about the same latitude as Sacramento, California. It is in Nye County, at the eastern edge of the Duckwater Indian Reservation, near the Red Mountain Wilderness at the end of Nevada State Route 379. The city of Las Vegas is about 200 miles (320 km) to the south-southeast.

A post office was established at Duckwater in 1873. The community was named for the ducks which frequented wetlands near the original town site.

== Education ==
All children may attend the Nye County School District's Duckwater School, but Native American children may elect to attend the Duckwater Shoshone Elementary School (D.S.E.S.), located on the reservation. D.S.E.S. is tribally-controlled and operated, with funding derived from the Bureau of Indian Education (BIE). The BIE provides most of the tribal school's funding. Both schools are K-8 one-room schools.

By 1975, Duckwater School, with one teacher, had an enrollment of six, since some students had withdrawn upon the opening of the reservation school. Prior to loss of Native American students, the school district provided hot lunches, and there were two teachers. By 1986, enrollment was thirteen, and the relationship between the Duckwater School and Duckwater Shoshone School community had mended. The teacher then had an aide, and used the aide and older students to ensure all students be on task. Of the thirteen students, nine had at least one sibling in their classes. Students came from ranching and mining families.

Duckwater Shoshone is in a building that previously functioned as a church. The school was established circa 1973 by tribal members who were dissatisfied with their children's course in the Nye County School District. The school board was established on July 26 of that year, and it opened on November 26 of that year after the United States Office of Education granted $35,000. In 1975, its student count was 21. In 1982, the school was renovated. It maintains its own zoological garden.

Most students in grades 9-12 attend Eureka County High School, 47 miles (76 km) north of Duckwater. As of 1999, the students on the reservation go to high school in Eureka, Eureka County High School of the Eureka County School District. Other high schools taking Duckwater area students, as of 1986, are Lund High School in Lund and White Pine High School in Ely, both of the White Pine County School District. As of 1986, residents of Ely and Eureka often take in high school students from Duckwater, who live with them while they attend high school.
