= Wilderness.net =

Wilderness.net is a website that provides public information about the 756 units of the National Wilderness Preservation System in the United States. Resources available include general information about each wilderness area, such as recreational activities, access methods and management policies. For most wilderness areas, a library of photographs is also provided. The site is a partnership between the United States Forest Service and the University of Montana.

The University of Montana Library describes Wilderness.net as the "definitive resource for wilderness information."
