= Troy Peak =

Mountain in Nevada, United States

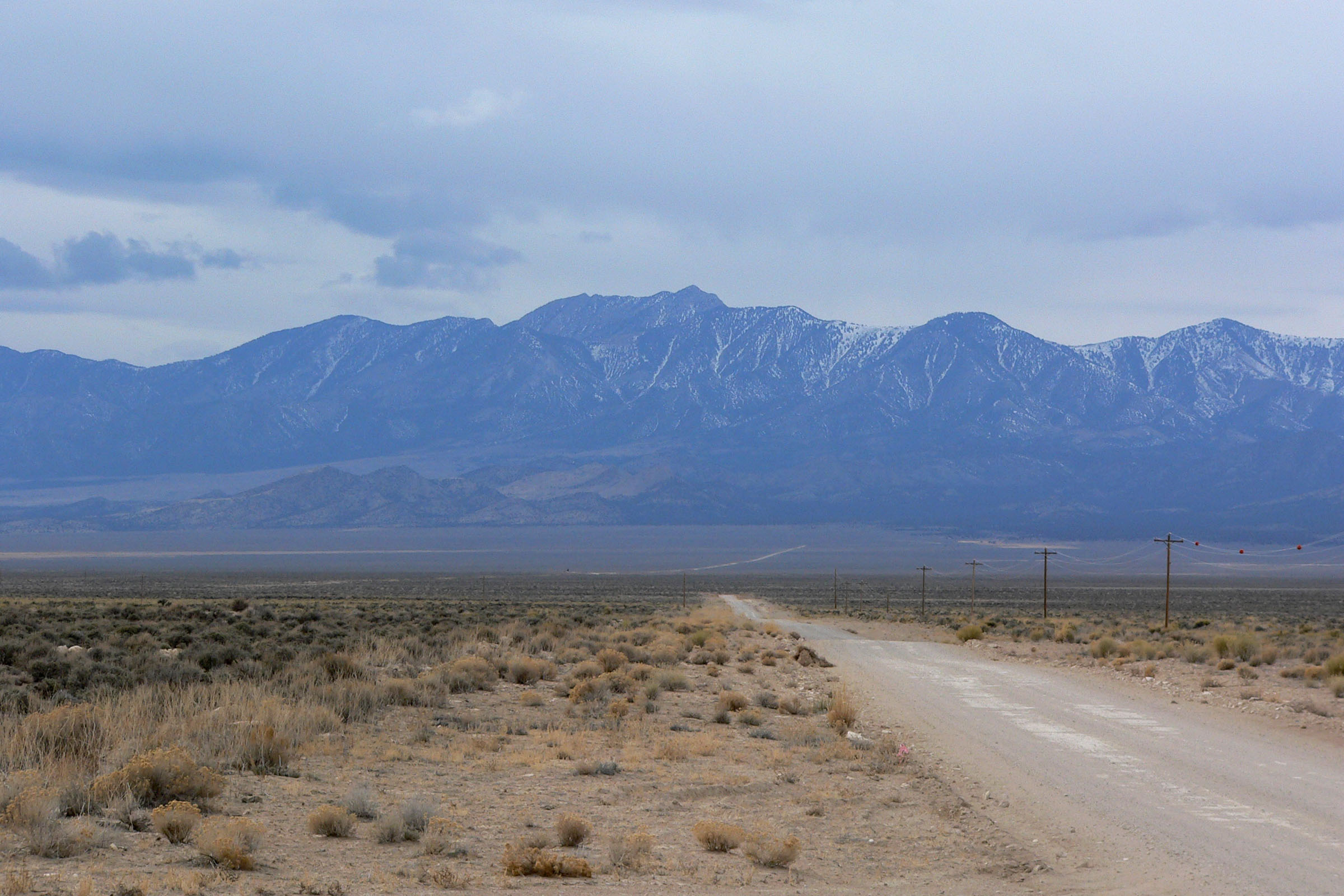
- Seen from the White River Valley

Highest point
- Elevation: 11,302 ft (3,445 m) NAVD 88
- Prominence: 4,790 ft (1,460 m)
- Coordinates: 38°19′10″N 115°30′07″W

Geography
- Location within Nevada
- Location: Nye County, Nevada, U.S.
- Parent range: Grant Range
- Topo map: USGS Troy Canyon

Climbing
- Easiest route: Southeast ridge: steep hike/scramble

Troy Peak is the highest mountain in the Grant Range in northeastern Nye County, Nevada, United States. It is the thirty-sixth highest mountain in Nevada. Troy Peak also ranks as the third-most topographically prominent peak in Nye County and the fourteenth-most prominent peak in the state. The summit is located 72 miles (116 km) southwest of the city of Ely, within the Grant Range Wilderness of the Humboldt-Toiyabe National Forest.

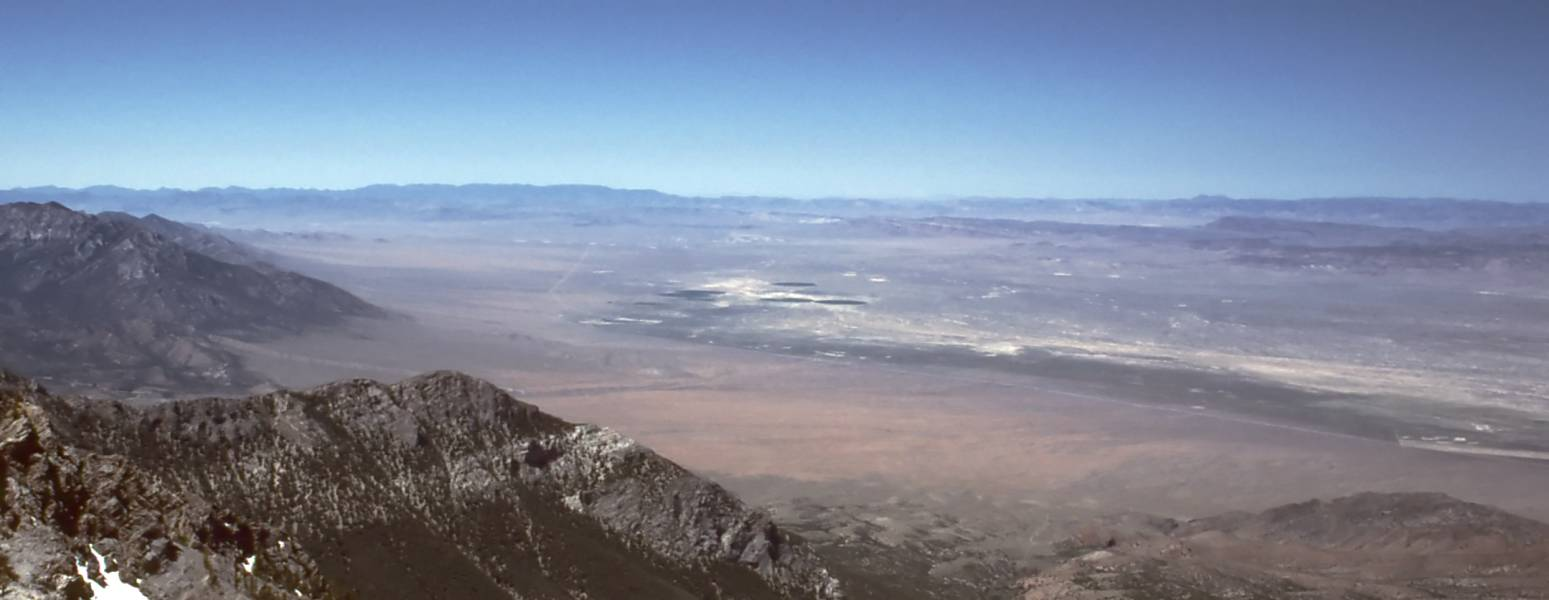
Railroad Valley, looking southwest from the summit of Troy Peak
