= Antelope Mountain (Utah) =

Mountain in Utah, United States

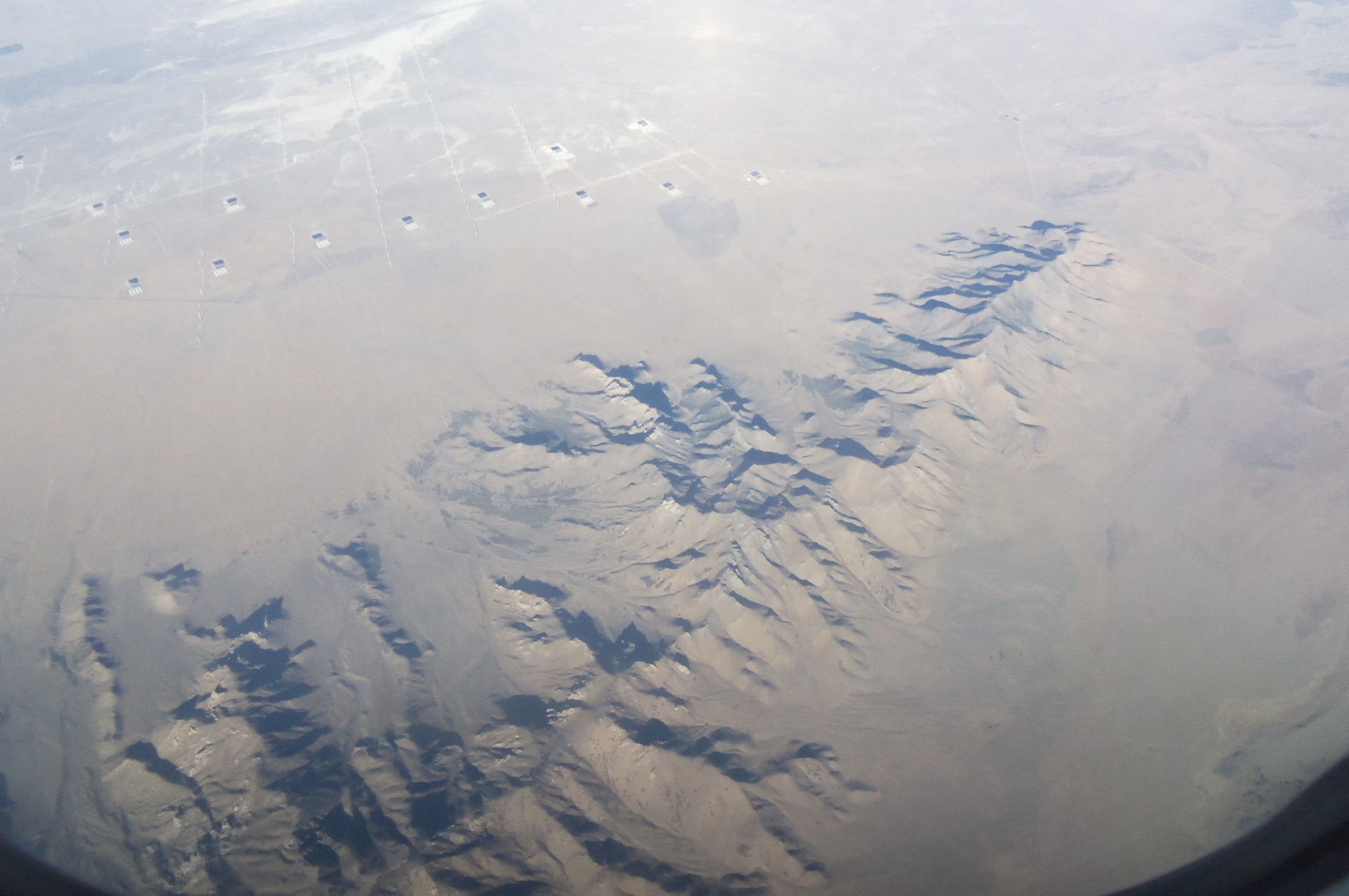
- Air photo from October 2020

Highest point
- Elevation: 7,230 ft (2,200 m)
- Coordinates: 38°36′25″N 112°49′19″W

Geography
- Location within Utah
- Country: United States
- State: Utah
- District: Great Basin
- Parent range: Mineral Mountains

Antelope Mountain is a linear mountain in Millard County, Utah. It is the northern end of the Mineral Mountains which extend into Beaver County to the south.
