= Park Range (Nevada) =

Mountain range in Nevada, United States

- Location within Nevada

Highest point
- Peak: Unnamed peak
- Elevation: 2,783 m (9,131 ft)
- Coordinates: 38°51′38″N 116°11′14″W

Dimensions
- Length: 10.7 mi (17.2 km) NNE - SSW
- Width: 7.2 mi (11.6 km) WNW - ESE

Geography
- Country: United States
- State: Nevada
- District: Nye County
- Range coordinates: 38°53′27.757″N 116°9′28.202″W
- Topo map: USGS Park Mountain

The Park Range is a mountain range in northeast Nye County, Nevada about 40 miles south of Eureka. The Antelope Range lies to the northwest and the Little Smoky Valley lies to the northeast. The Big Sand Springs Valley and the Pancake Range are to the east. The Hot Creek Range is to the southwest.

Peaks include an unnamed peak in the south end of the range at 9,131 ft (2,783 m) and Park Mountain in the north end of the range at 9,058 ft (2,761 m). Andesite Ridge (peak elevation 8,045 ft (2,452 m)) runs adjacent and parallel to the southeast side of the range, separated from the range by Prichards Canyon. Historic Summit Station, Prichards Station and Hicks Station were on the roads east, south and west of the range respectively.

== Wilderness study area ==
The Park Range Wilderness Study Area encompasses almost all of the range. The range is rugged and ungrazed by livestock with natural meadows with good water sources existing in the volcanic bedrock. Forests of pinyon pine, juniper and mountain mahogany occur in the range.

== Geology ==
The range is typical of the Basin and Range in Nevada. It is bounded by high angle faults on all sides. Most of the range consists of Oligocene rhyolitic to latitic volcanic flows and pyroclastic deposits along with some andesites. The volcanic rock layers are tilted to the west with a dip of about 20° to the east. At the north end of the range Paleozoic sedimentary rocks including Ordovician Goodwin Limestone and Silurian Devils Gate Limestone are found along with other sedimentary rocks as fault blocks within the volcanic rocks. The block of Paleozoic sediments have been prospected for epithermal (hot spring associated) gold as has the Andesite Ridge area which lies just to the southeast of the main range.
