= Horse Range (Nevada) =

Mountain range in Nevada, United States

- Location within Nevada

Highest point
- Elevation: 2,322 m (7,618 ft)

Geography
- Country: United States
- State: Nevada
- District: Nye County
- Range coordinates: 38°38′4.786″N 115°17′38.079″W
- Topo map: USGS Callaway Well

The Horse Range is a mountain range in Nye County, Nevada, United States.
