= Lunar Crater National Natural Landmark =

Geological landmark in the U.S. state of Nevada

Coordinates: 38.3841237°N 116.0688927°W

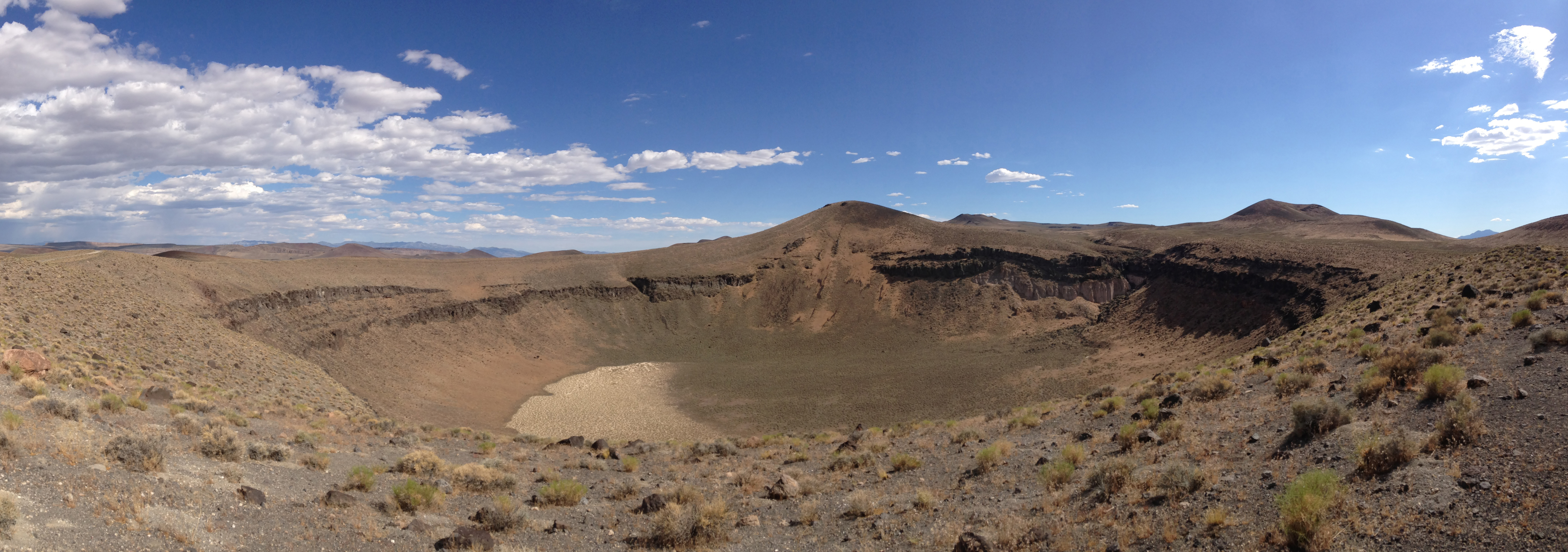
Lunar Crater as seen from the overlook, July 2014

Lunar Crater National Natural Landmark recognizes the Lunar Crater volcanic field in Nye County, central Nevada, as a United States National Natural Landmark. It is located 70 miles (110 km) east-northeast of Tonopah and was designated in 1973.

== Volcanic features ==
The volcanic field encompasses numerous volcanic craters and cinder cones, including a 400-acre (1.6 km^{2}) crater that is thought to have been formed by several volcanic explosions and is one of the field's two maars.

== Astronaut training ==
In September 1972, Lunar Crater was used by NASA to train astronauts of the Apollo program in recognizing geological and volcanic features expected on the Moon. Their field exercises included two rover traverses. Astronauts who used this training on the Moon include Apollo 16's John Young and Charlie Duke, as well as Apollo 17's Gene Cernan and Jack Schmitt. Notable geologist instructors included William R. Muehlberger.

== See also ==
- National Natural Landmarks in Nevada
- Volcanic fields of the Great Basin Section
