= Antelope Ridge (Juab County, Utah) =

Hills in Utah, United States

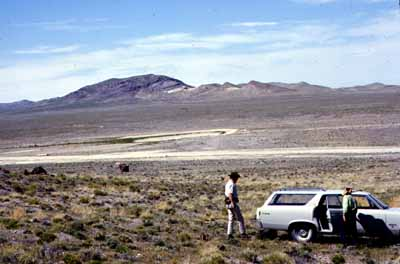
- View northeast from the Drum Mountains, showing a sequence of rhyolite flows, vitrophyre, and tuff of Topaz Mountain Rhyolite on Antelope Ridge (USGS photo)

Highest point
- Elevation: 5,417 ft (1,651 m)

Geography
- Country: United States
- Region: Utah
- District: Great Basin
- Range coordinates: 39°42′30″N 113°03′13″W

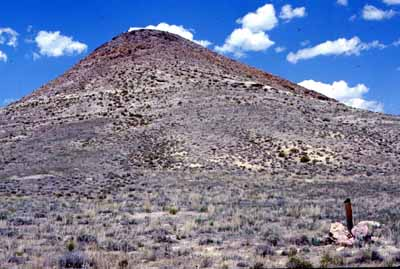
Crossbedded tuff of Topaz Mountain Rhyolite at the south end of Antelope Ridge (USGS photo)

Antelope Ridge is a group of hills in Juab County, Utah. It is located east of Topaz Mountain.
