= Railroad Valley (Nevada) =

Valley in Nye County, United States of America

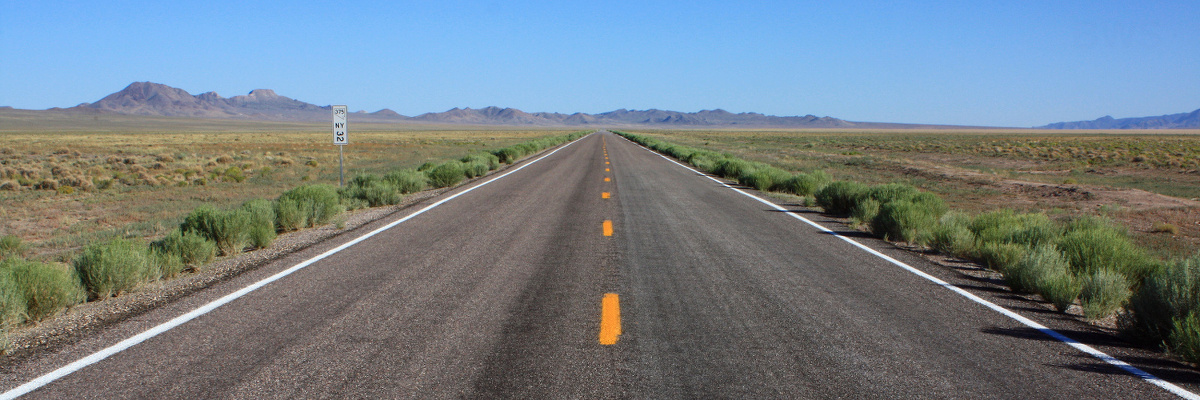
- State Route 375 through Railroad Valley with the Quinn Canyon Range in the distance

- Location within Nevada
- Floor elevation: 7,036 to 10,745 ft (2,145 to 3,275 m)
- Length: 80 mi (130 km) N–S
- Width: 20 mi (32 km) SW–NE
- Area: 90 mi^{2} (230 km^{2})

Geography
- Location: Tonopah Basin
- Country: United States
- State: Nevada
- Region: Nye and White Pine County
- Borders on: List: Quinn Canyon Range; Grant Range; White Pine Range; Pancake Range; Reveille Range
- Coordinates: 38°41′14″N 115°29′28″W
- Interactive map of Railroad Valley

Railroad Valley is one of the Central Nevada Desert Basins in the Tonopah Basin and is about 80 miles (130 km) long north–south and up to 20 miles (32 km) wide, with some southern areas running southwest to northeast.

== Description ==
The southern end of the valley begins near Gray Top Mountain (elevation 7,036 feet [2,145 m]) and stretches north all the way to Mount Hamilton (elevation 10,745 feet [3,275 m]). To the east are the Quinn Canyon, Grant, and White Pine Ranges, while to the west are the Pancake and Reveille Ranges. Most of the valley lies in Nye County, but it crosses into White Pine County at its northern end.

The valley includes numerous springs including Kate Springs and Blue Eagle Springs, ranches such as the Blue Eagle Ranch, and two Tonopah Playas.

The valley has four separate Wildlife Management Areas ("Railroad Valley WMA"), and valley communities include Currant, Crows Nest, Green Springs, Lockes, and Nyala.

The valley is the ancestral home of the Tsaidüka band of Western Shoshone, who are now enrolled in the Duckwater Shoshone Tribe of the Duckwater Reservation.

== Natural resources ==
Most of Nevada's oil production (totalling about 553,000 barrels (87,900 m^{3}) during 2002) comes from several small oil fields in Railroad Valley, including Eagle Springs, Trap Spring, and Grant Canyon oil fields.

In 1954, the Shell Oil Company drilled the first well. The Eagle Springs Field, as it came to be known, included 14 wells with an average production of approximately 20,000 barrels (3,200 m^{3}) per well per year by 1968. As of 1985, only 10 wells remained that together had produced approximately 3.8 million barrels (600×10^{3} m^{3}) in total. By 1986, when a second oil field was discovered by Northwest Exploration Co, the Valley had 27 wells that were expected to produce 6.8 million barrels (1.08×10^{6} m^{3}).

The Valley also contains a playa with a lithium deposit that is "one of the 10 largest in the world and the largest in North America, with salt deposits 2,000 feet (610 m) thick".

Since the 1990s, NASA has used the flat ground for calibrating satellite geodesy, space-based radar, and height measurements. In June 2023, NASA asked the USA's Bureau of Land Management to set aside 36 mi^{2} (93 km^{2}; 23,000 acres; 9,300 ha) from its inventory of federal lands open to potential mineral exploration and mining, in order to ensure that the calibration area was preserved.

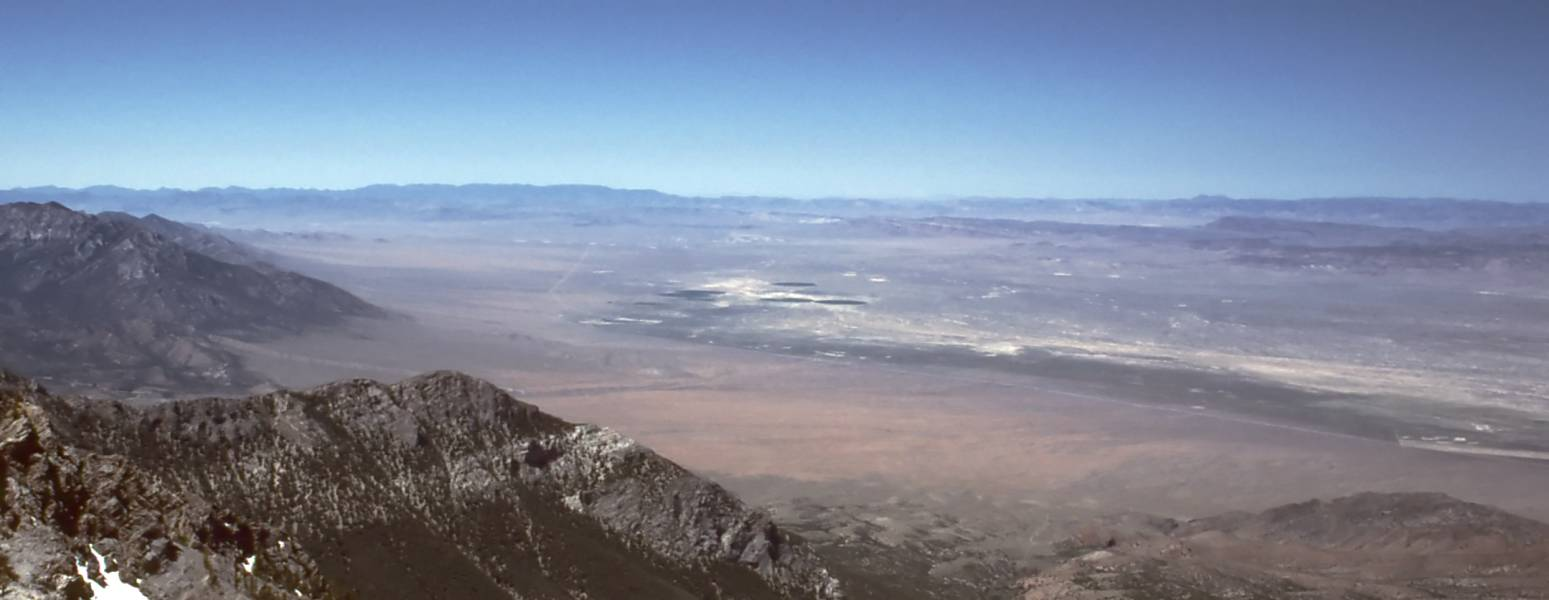
The central portion of Railroad Valley, looking southwest from the summit of Troy Peak.

== See also ==
- List of valleys of Nevada
