= Antelope Hills, California =

Antelope Hills
- Location within California Location within the United States

Highest point
- Elevation: 222 m (728 ft)

Geography
- Country: United States
- State: California
- District: Kern County
- Range coordinates: 35°32′6.866″N 119°48′21.479″W
- Topo map: USGS Blackwells Corner

The Antelope Hills are a low mountain range in the Transverse Ranges, in western Kern County, California. In 1910 Arnold and Johnson from the United States Geological Survey proposed the name "Antelope Hills" for "the group of low hills [that] are a range for the few wild antelope left in this region."
