= Currant, Nevada =

Unincorporated community in Nye County, Nevada, US

- Unincorporated community
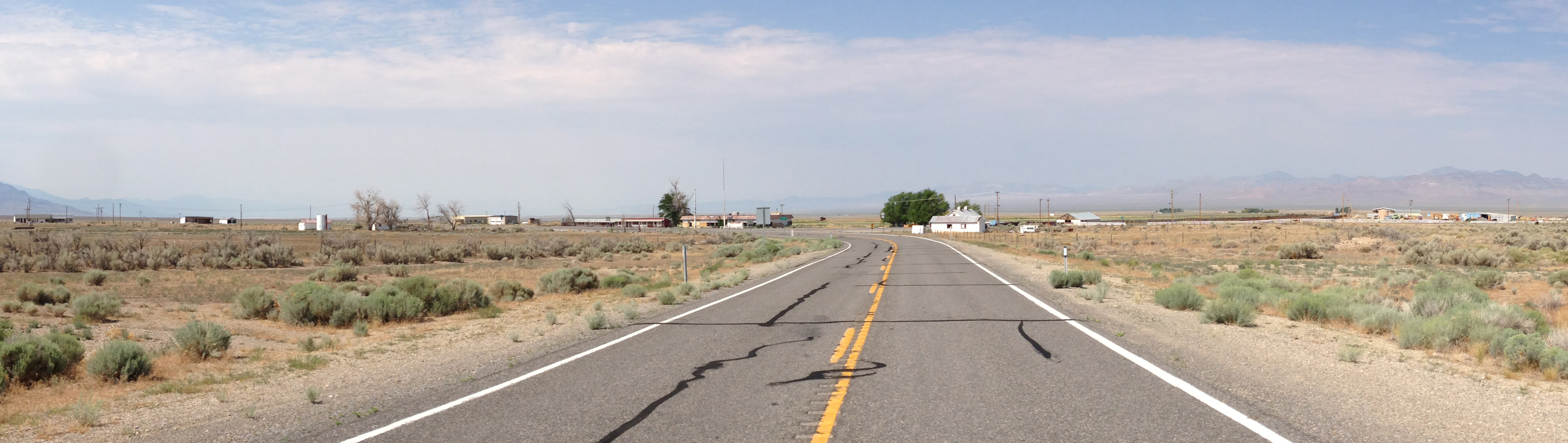
- Currant, Nevada, viewed from westbound U.S. Route 6

- Location in Nevada Location in the United States
- Coordinates: 38°44′28″N 115°28′44″W
- Country: United States
- State: Nevada
- County: Nye
- Established: 1868

Population
  - Total: 65
- Time zone: UTC-8 (Pacific Time Zone)
  - Summer (DST): UTC-7 (Pacific Daylight Time)

Currant is an unincorporated community in Nye County, Nevada. Settled in 1868, it was first a farming town with a small population. Its current population is 65.

== Name ==
Creeks nearby were named for the wild currants growing with the town, taking the name from Currant Creek.

== History ==
Currant post office opened April 16, 1883, was reestablished September 19, 1892, and again August 31, 1926, operations suspended December 31, 1943. In 1914, a small amount of gold was discovered.

In the late 1930s, small but highly productive claims of magnesite deposits were discovered in Nye County while major deposits were in Ely in White Pine County, Nevada, and magnesite mining stopped in 1942.

== Transportation ==
Currant is located on U.S. Route 6 at the junction of State Route 379.

The area is served by the Currant Ranch Airport.
