= Quinn Canyon Range =

Mountain range in Nevada, United States

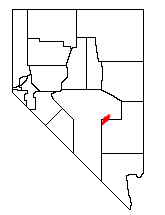
Location of the Quinn Canyon Range within Nevada

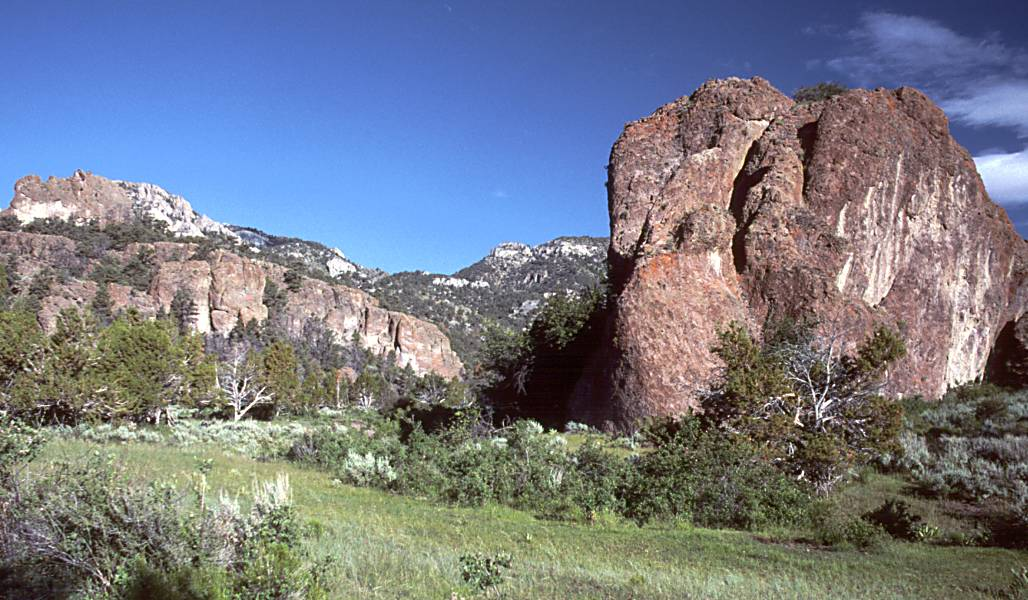
Rock formations in Little Cherry Creek Valley, within the Quinn Canyon Wilderness

The Quinn Canyon Range is a remote group of mountains in northeastern Nye County, and western Lincoln County in central Nevada in the western United States. Adaven is the only settlement in the mountains, now abandoned.

It is closely associated with the Grant Range, which connects to it at the mountain pass of Cherry Creek Summit 7,596 feet (2,315 m). From there, the range runs for approximately 33 miles to the southwest. To the west is the large Railroad Valley, to the east is White River Valley, and to the south is Sand Spring Valley.

The high point of the range is an unnamed peak at 10,185 feet (3,104 m) at 38°07.341′N 115°42.518′W.

The Quinn Canyon and Grant Ranges are adjacent to the Basin and Range National Monument created by President Barack Obama in 2015, being excellent examples of the Great Basin and the Basin and Range Province. The higher elevations of the range are protected as the Quinn Canyon Wilderness.

The sagebrush cinquefoil (Potentilla johnstonii) is a rare species of plant that has only been seen in the Quinn Canyon Range.

The range hosts only one settlement, now a ghost town; called Adaven.

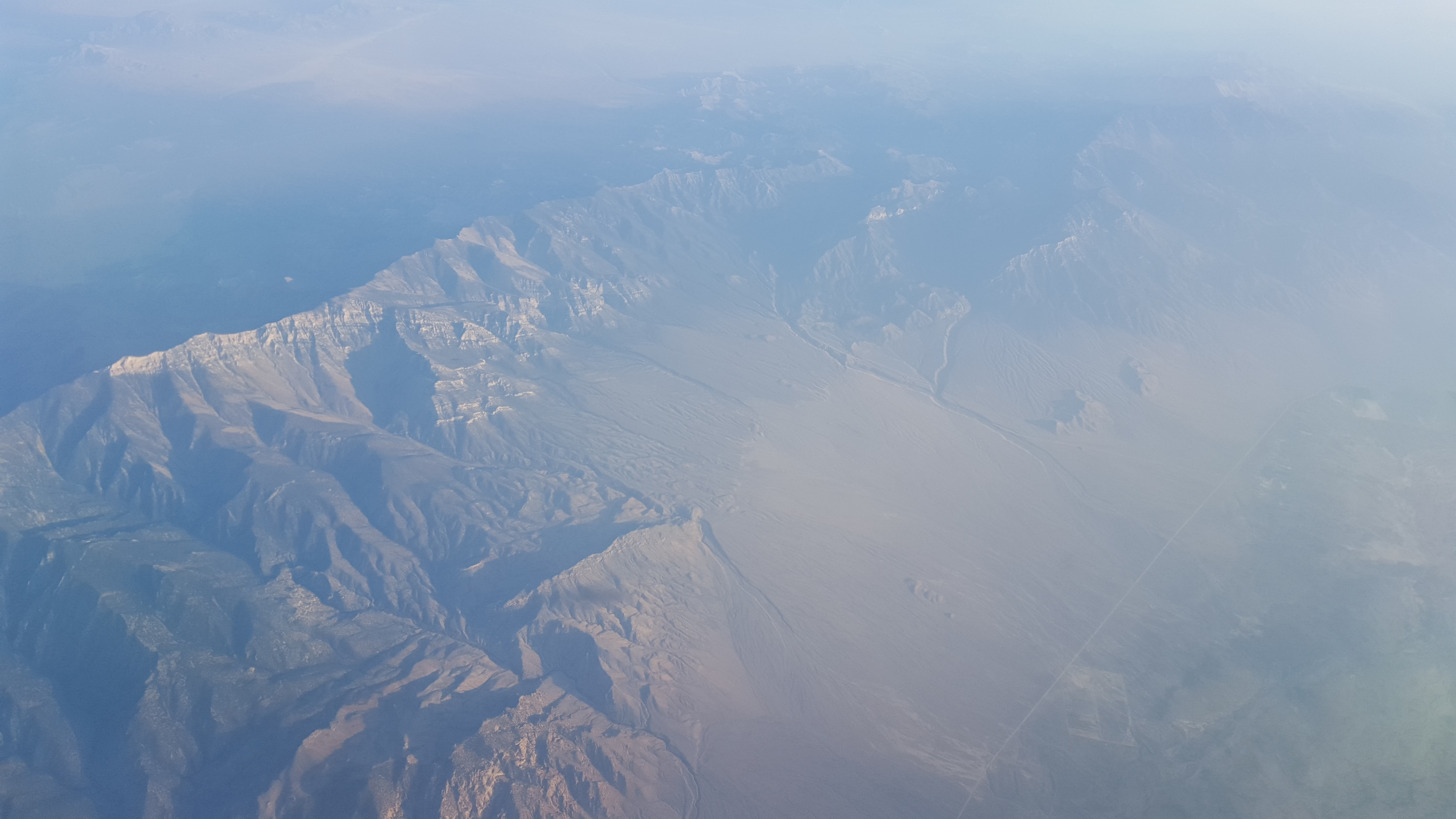
Quinn Canyon Range, from the North

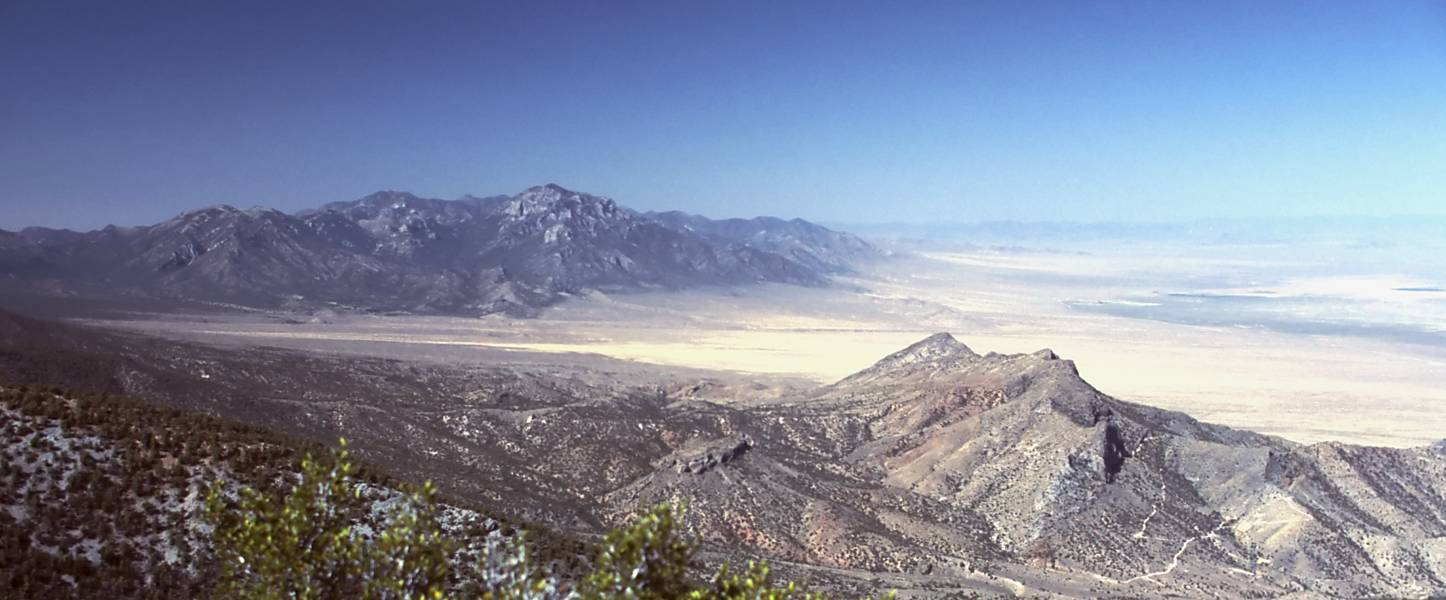
The Quinn Canyon Range, looking southwest
