= Duckwater Shoshone Tribe of the Duckwater Reservation =

Federally recognized tribe in Nevada

Duckwater Shoshone Tribe
Tsaidüka (Shoshoni)
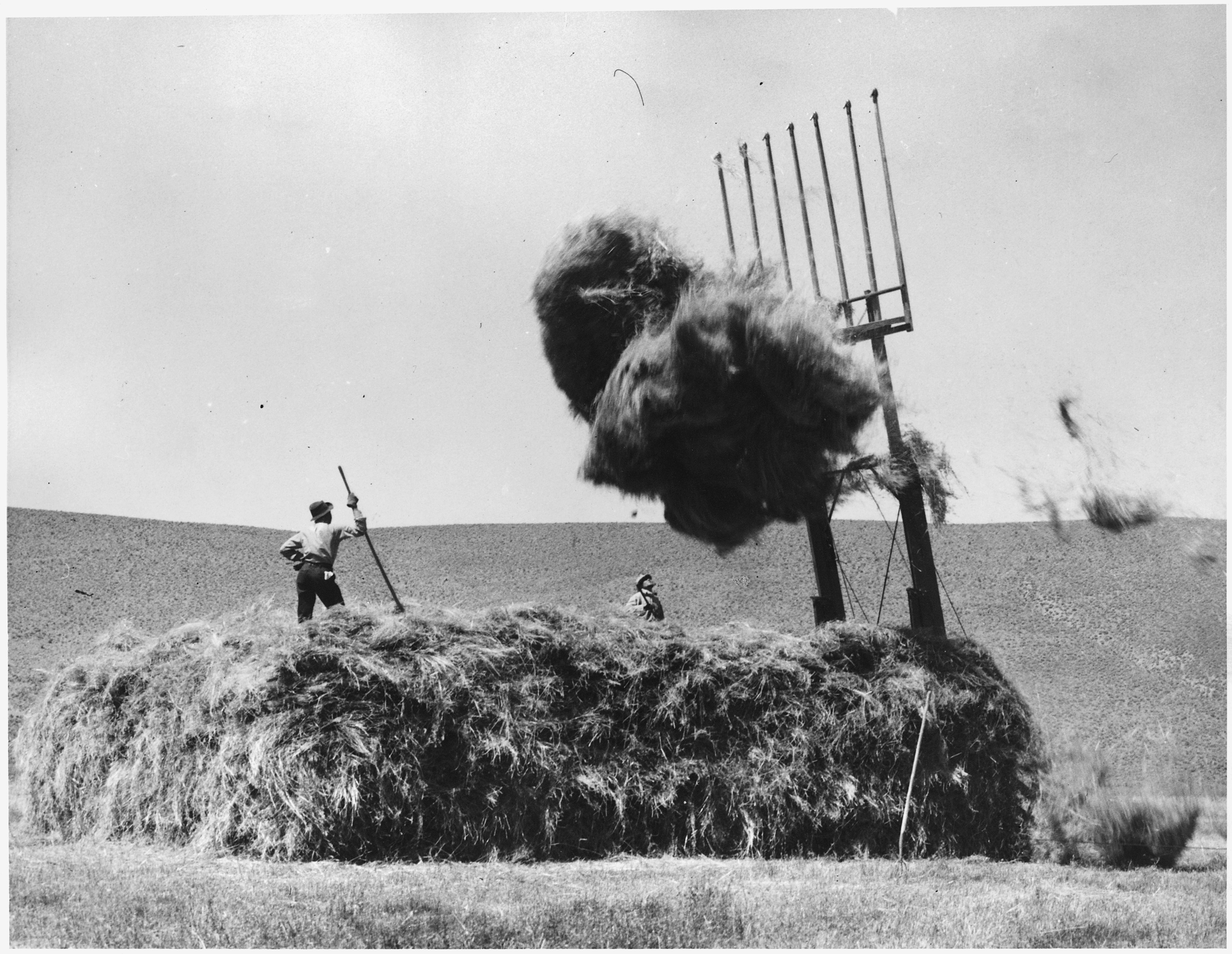
- Haymaking at Duckwater Reservation in the 1930s

Total population
- ~288

Regions with significant populations
- United States (Nevada)

Languages
- English, Shoshone

Religion
- Traditional tribal religion

Related ethnic groups
- Other Western Shoshone tribes

The Duckwater Shoshone Tribe is a federally recognized tribe of Western Shoshone, based in central Nevada in the high desert Railroad Valley, in northern Nye County. Their autonym, Tsaidüka in their Shoshoni language, translates as "tule eaters". They were formerly known as the Duckwater Shoshone Tribe of the Duckwater Reservation.

In October 2016, under the Nevada Native Nations Land Act, they were one of six federally recognized tribes in Nevada to have additional lands put into trust for their reservations. The Duckwater Shoshone Tribe is to receive approximately 31,269 acres (127 km^{2}) of Bureau of Land Management (BLM) land. Gaming is prohibited on the new lands.

== Reservation ==
Location of the Duckwater Reservation in Nevada

The Duckwater Shoshone Tribe has a federal reservation, the Duckwater Reservation (38°55′49″N 115°42′37″W), in Nye County, Nevada. The reservation was established in 1940, when the tribe purchased the 3,272-acre (13.24 km^{2}) Florio Ranch and 21 families moved onto the land. Today, it is approximately 3,815 acres (15.44 km^{2}). In 1990, 288 tribal citizens lived on the reservation.

In October 2016 the federal government put into trust for the tribe approximately 31,269 acres (127 km^{2}) acres of Bureau of Land Management (BLM) land in Nevada, in order to expand their reservation and give them a more sustainable base. Gaming is prohibited on these new lands. This was done under the Nevada Native Nations Land Act (PL No: 114-232).

== History ==
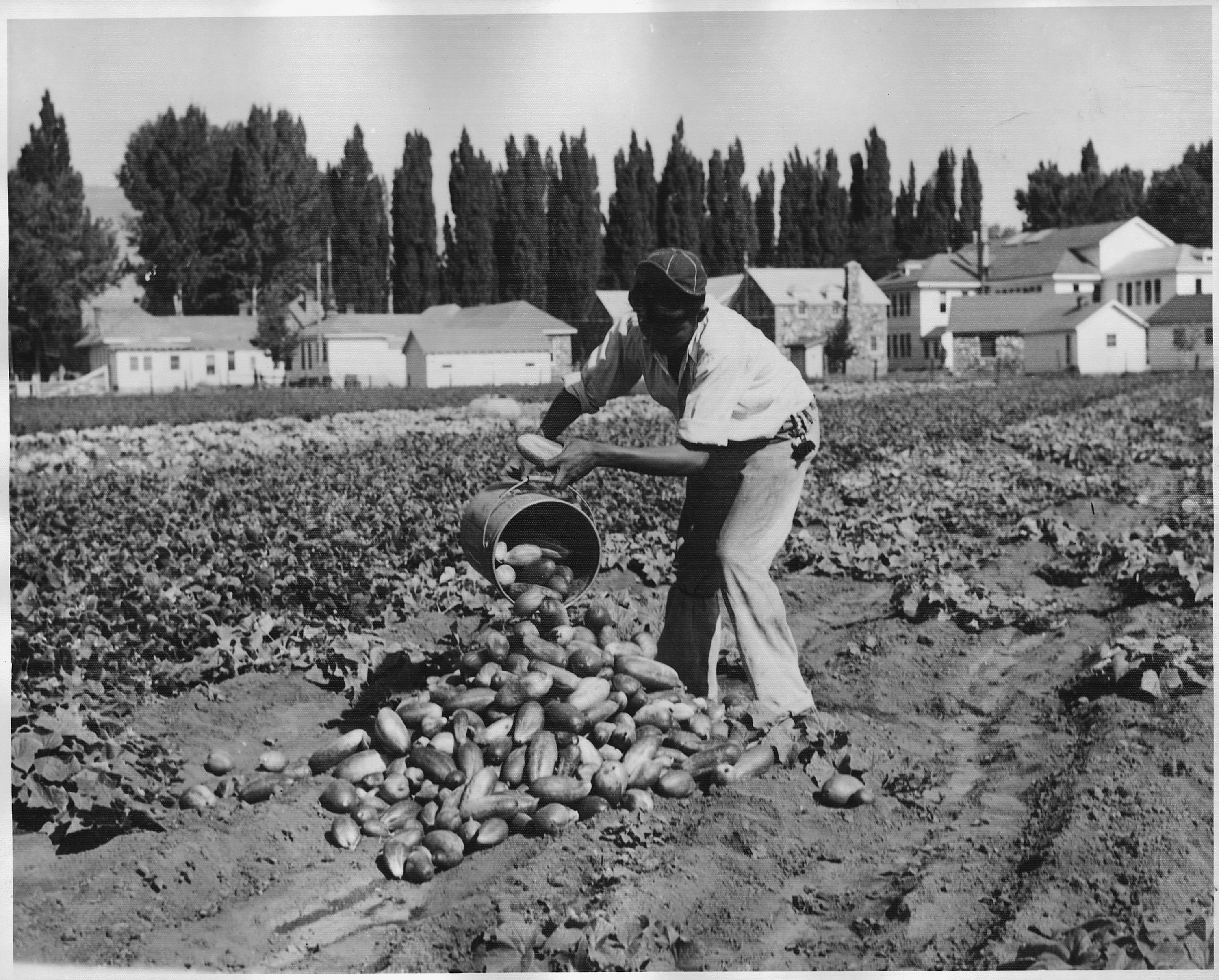
John Billy (Paiute) farming at Duckwater Reservation in the 1930s

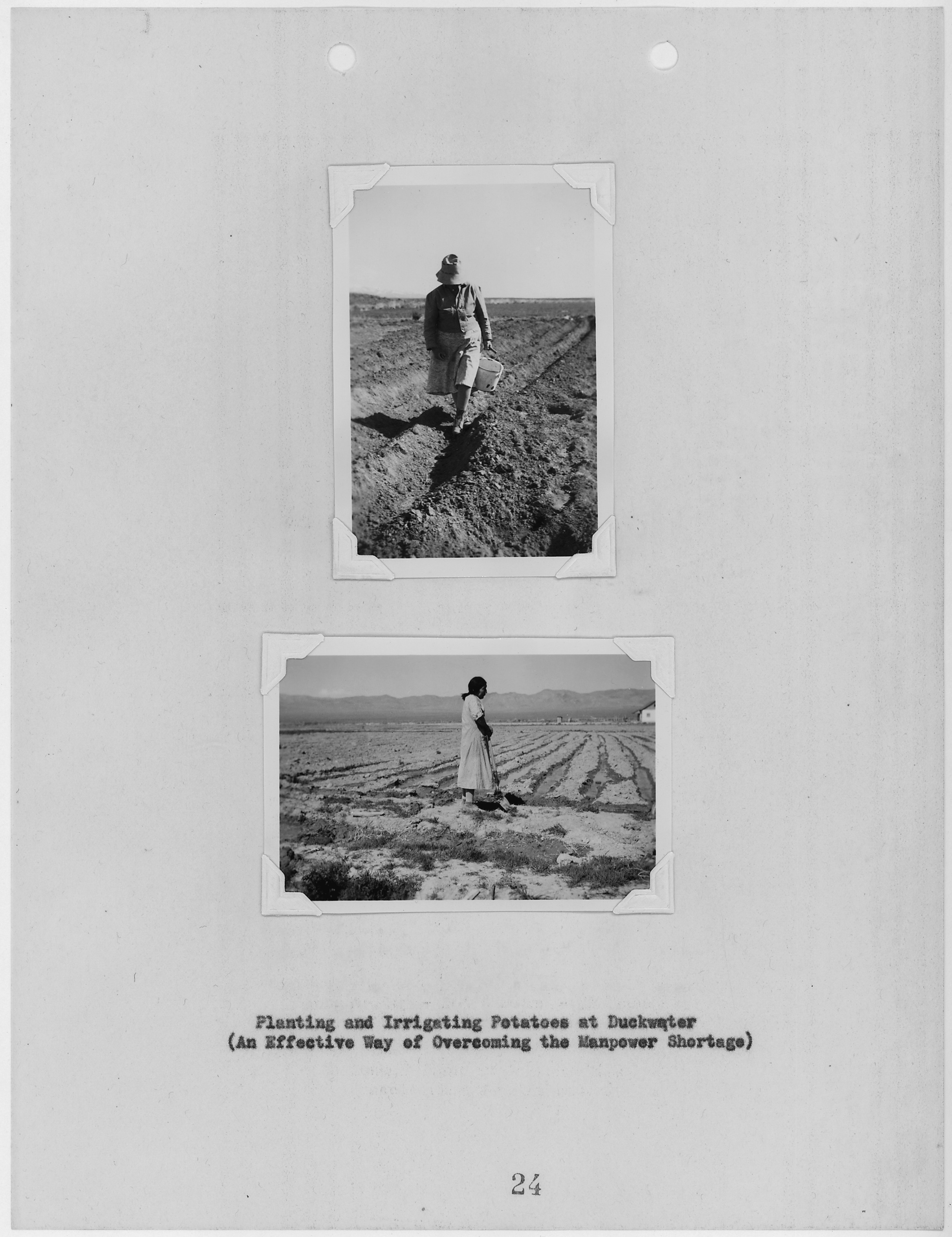
Potato farming at Duckwater Reservation, 1942

Traditionally, this band of Shoshone, a Great Basin tribe, hunted near Railroad Valley in the summer and lived in conical-shaped houses in the mountains in the winter. They hunted ducks, sage grouse, prairie dogs, rabbits, ground squirrels, deer, and other big game. They cultivated chenopodium and Mentzelia.

European-American settlers enter their lands in the late 19th century. The 1863 Treaty of Ruby Valley called for peace between the Western Shoshone and settlers, stipulated that no further white settlement would occur, and did not surrender any Western Shoshone land. Citizens of the tribe found employment as ranch hands.

The tribe formed a new government under the 1934 Indian Reorganization Act.

== 21st century ==
The Duckwater Shoshone Tribe is headquartered in Duckwater, Nevada. They are governed by a democratically elected, five-member tribal council. Elections are held annually, and members serve staggered terms. Their tribal chairman is Virginia Sanchez, who succeeded Jerry Millet. The tribe has an environmental health office, a health clinic, Police Department, and senior center.

Duckwater-Shoshone Nursery is a tribal venture. The nurseries raise native plants in two greenhouses. These are used in phytoremediation projects by mining operations. The US Fish and Wildlife Service has awarded the tribe three grants to restore Railroad Valley springfish, a threatened species.

Each June, the tribe celebrates its annual Duckwater Festival, with a powwow, barbecue, handgames, and other events. This is a continuation of the traditional summer festivals held by the tribe, when the round dance was danced.

== Education ==
A K-8 school, Duckwater Shoshone School, funded by the Bureau of Indian Education (BIE), is in a building that previously functioned as a church. The school was established circa 1973 by tribal citizens who were not satisfied with their children's course in the Nye County School District. The school board was established on July 26 of that year, and it opened on November 26 of that year after the United States Office of Education granted $35,000. In 1975 its student count was 21. In 1982 the school got a renovation. It maintains its own zoological garden.

The Nye County district school, also K-8, is known as the Duckwater School. In 1975 this school, with one teacher, had an enrollment count of six as students had withdrawn with the opening of the reservation school. Prior to loss of Native American students, the school district provided heated lunches, and there were two teachers instead of one. By 1986 enrollment was up to 13 and the relationship between the Duckwater School and Duckwater Shoshone School community had mended. The teacher by then had an aide for assistance, and used the aide and older students to have all students of all ages be on task. Of the 13 students, nine had at least one sibling also in their classes. Students came from ranching and mining families.

As of 1999 the students on the reservation go to a high school in Eureka, Eureka County High School of the Eureka County School District. Other high schools taking Duckwater area students, as of 1986, are Lund High School in Lund and White Pine High School in Ely, both of the White Pine County School District. As of 1986 local residents in Ely and Eureka often take in high school students from Duckwater who live with them while they attend high school.

== Notable tribal citizens ==
- Tina Manning (d. 1979), water rights activist
