= Table Mountain (disambiguation) =

Table Mountain is a large flat-topped mountain overlooking Cape Town, South Africa.

Table Mountain may also refer to:

- Tableland, or Table mountain or table, also called a mesa, butte, flank of a mountain, or mountain, that has a flat top

== Mountains ==
- Table Mountain (Antarctica), a mountain in Victoria Land, Antarctica
- The Table (British Columbia) or Table Mountain, British Columbia, Canada
- Table Mountains, Czech Republic and Poland
- Table Mountain (West Papua), Indonesia
- Table Mountain (Wicklow), Ireland
- Tafelberg, Suriname
- Crug Hywel or Table Mountain, Wales, United Kingdom

=== United States ===
- Table Top Mountain (Juneau, Alaska)
- Table Mountain (Butte County, California)
- Table Mountain (Kings County, California)
- Table Mountain (Tulare County, California)
- Table Mountain (Tuolumne County, California)
- North Table Mountain, Jefferson County, Colorado
- South Table Mountain (Colorado), Jefferson County, Colorado
- Table Mountain (Madison County, Montana)
- Table Mountain (Churchill County, Nevada)
- Table Mountain (Nye County, Nevada)
- Table Mountain (New York), in the Catskills
- Table Top Mountain (New York), in the Adirondacks
- Table Rock (North Carolina), or Table Rock Mountain
- Table Mountain (Skamania County, Washington)
- Table Mountain (Whatcom County, Washington)
- Table Mountain (Wyoming)
- Table Mountain (Yellowstone National Park)

== Other uses ==
- Table Mountain National Park in Cape Town, South Africa
- Table Mountain Observatory, San Bernardino County, California, U.S.
- Table Mountain Rancheria, Native American tribe, Fresno County, California, U.S.
- Table Mountain Wilderness, in the Monitor Range, Nevada, U.S.
- Table Mountain Regional Park, a ski area in Saskatchewan, Canada
- 84882 Table Mountain, an asteroid
- Mensa (constellation), or Table Mountain
- An early name for Mount Wellington, Tasmania, Australia
- Table Mountain, the castle setting for the first four series of BBC Schools programme Megamaths
