= Dome Mountain (disambiguation) =

Dome Mountain may refer to:

- Dome mountain, a geological term
- Dome Mountain, a mountain peak in British Columbia
- Dome Mountain (Colorado), high mountain summit
- Dome Mountain (Hot Springs County, Wyoming), a mountain peak in Shoshone National Forest, Wyoming
- Dome Mountain (Wyoming), a mountain peak in Yellowstone National Park, Wyoming
- Dome Mountain (Toonumbar), one of several mountains in Australia called Dome Mountain
- Castle Dome Mountains, a mountain range in Arizona
- Black Dome Mountain, a mountain peak in British Columbia
- Puy de Dôme, is a large lava dome in France
- Carter Dome, a mountain peak in New Hampshire
- Dome Rock Mountains, a mountain range in Arizona
- Dome Mountain (Los Angeles County), near Pyramid Lake
