= Bartine Hot Springs =

Thermal spring

Bartine Hot Springs Bartine Ranch Hot Springs
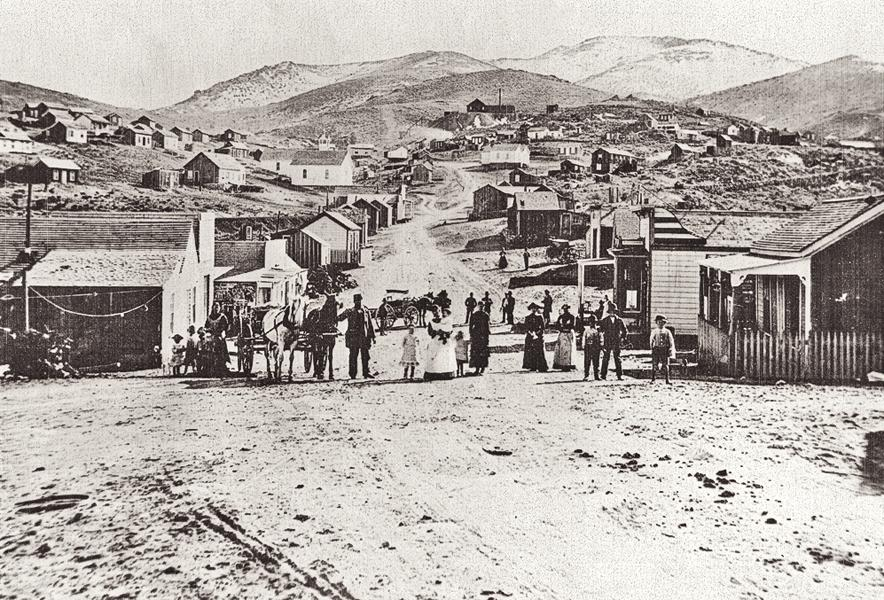
- Ruby Hill historic mining town in 1878 served by Fred Bartine's waterworks
- Interactive map of Bartine Hot Springs; Bartine Ranch Hot Springs
- Coordinates: 39°33′30″N 116°21′40″W
- Elevation: 6,102 ft (1,860 m)
- Type: geothermal spring
- Temperature: 102 to 108 °F (39 to 42 °C)

Bartine Hot Springs also known as Bartine Ranch Hot Springs are geothermal hot springs located in the Antelope Valley of the Nevada high desert 40 kilometers northwest of the town of Eureka.

== History ==
The Bartine Ranch where the hot springs are located is named for Frederick "Fred" Bartine (1888–1964), who was born in Finland before immigrating to the U.S. to settle in Nevada in 1901. In addition to the ranch and hot springs, he owned the Ruby Hill Water Works, the Bartine Service Station, two mining claims. From 1924 to 1934, Bartine served as a Eureka County Commissioner. Bartine developed 640 acres and drilled three artesian wells on this property.

== Location ==
The general physiographic area is in the intermontane plateaus of the Basin and Range Province of the Great Basin Desert. The springs are located on a large tufa mound known as Hot Spring Hill surrounded by snow-capped mountains of the Monitor, Simpson Park and Mountain Boy ranges. A four-foot square concrete box has been built in the tufa mound as a soaking pool as well as a heart-shaped stone soaking pool. Bartine Warm Spring and a cold spring are located approximately 4 miles southeast of the hot springs.

== Water profile ==
There are four distinct hot spring sources on Hot Spring Hill. An artesian well is located approximately three miles away adjacent to the Bartine Ranch. The hot mineral water emerges from the spring at a range of 102 °F to 108 °F.

== See also ==
- List of hot springs in the United States
- List of hot springs in the world
