= Tafelberg =

Tafelberg is Afrikaans, Dutch and German for "table mountain". It may refer to:

- Table Mountain, a flat-topped mountain overlooking Cape Town, South Africa
- Tafelberg, Suriname, a mountain in Suriname
- Tafelberg (Curaçao), a hill in Curaçao
- Täfelberg, a mountain in Baden-Württemberg, Germany
- Tafelberg (musical instrument), a type of percussive string instrument made by Yuri Landman
- Tafelberg Uitgewers, South African book publishing company
- SAS Tafelberg, a former ship of the South African Navy

== See also ==
- Table Mountain (disambiguation)
