= Eagle Peak (Wyoming) =

Mountain

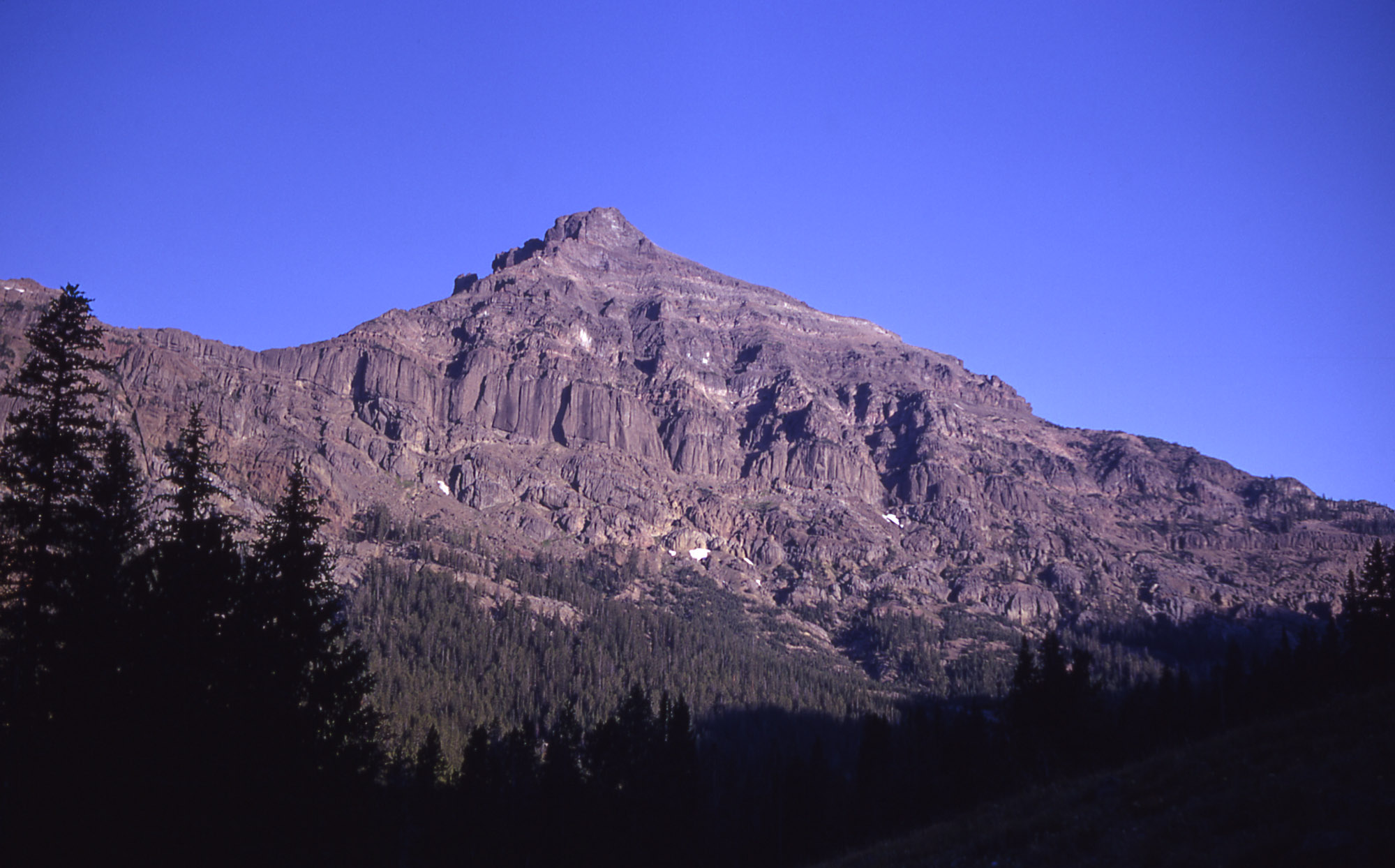
- Eagle Peak

Highest point
- Elevation: 11,372 ft (3,466 m) NAVD 88
- Prominence: 1,847 ft (563 m)
- Coordinates: 44°19′15″N 110°01′40″W

Geography
- Location within Wyoming Location within the United States
- Location: Park County, Wyoming, U.S.
- Parent range: Absaroka Range
- Topo map: USGS Eagle Peak

Geology
- Mountain type: Stratovolcano

Eagle Peak is a mountain in the Absaroka Range in the U.S. state of Wyoming and at 11,372 feet (3,466 m) is the highest point in Yellowstone National Park. It is located about 6 miles (9.7 km) east of the southeast arm of Yellowstone Lake.

== Etymology ==
According to Lee Whittlesey, Eagle Peak was named in 1885 by geologist Arnold Hague for its resemblance to a "spread eagle". Another source states that it was named in 1878 by Jack Newell, who killed a golden eagle on the mountain that year.

== History ==
Up until the 1930s, most park officials and geologists believed that Electric Peak near Gardiner, Montana was the park's highest peak, not Eagle Peak. It is ranked as the 218th highest peak in Wyoming and the 2252nd highest peak in the United States. During the historic Yellowstone fires of 1988, the south slopes of Eagle Peak were affected by the Mink Fire.

== Geology ==
Eagle Peak is part of the Absaroka Range and is formed of Eocene age volcaniclastic rocks. In the last ice age, the area was covered by an ice cap over 1,600 feet (490 m) thick. Glacial deposits remain in some locations on the mountain. Eagle Peak is a remnant of an Absaroka stratovolcano.

== Geography ==
Located in the Absaroka Range, on the park boundary with Shoshone National Forest in northwestern Wyoming, the mountain rises about 6 mi (9.7 km) east of the southeast arm of Yellowstone Lake. The mountain is also one of the highest points in the Washakie Wilderness area of Shoshone National Forest. Eagle Peak is of a similar height to several other local mountains; there is a ridge which gradually gets higher as it heads southeast culminating in several summits - Mount Schurz, to the immediate northwest is shorter, and Pinnacle Mountain, to the immediate southeast, is taller, but outside of the park boundary.

Several creeks flow through the mountain and the surrounding area and they become a vehicle for cold melt water. The Gardner River flows to the east of the summit. Some of the runoff is fed by the melting of the two major snowfields found in the shadows of the north face of the mountain. The range to the east drains into the Yellowstone River via the Bighorn River, but the southern slopes drain into Yellowstone Lake via Mountain Creek.

Eagle Peak is one of the most prominent features of the Eagle Peak Quadrangle, a USGS division used for surveying purposes. Other nearby peaks are Mount Humphreys, Table Mountain, Mount Schurz, Pinnacle Mountain, Turret Mountain and Colter Peak.

== Access ==
The mountain is fairly inaccessible, being a 15-mile (24 km) hike from any of the park roads. From outside the park, the peak can be ascended by hiking up the Fish Hawk Creek valley, which is around 25 kilometres (16 mi) one-way. It is also climbed from inside the park, by sailing to the southeasternmost tip of Yellowstone Lake, hiking down the Yellowstone River valley, and then turning to the east for the ascent.

== Wildlife ==
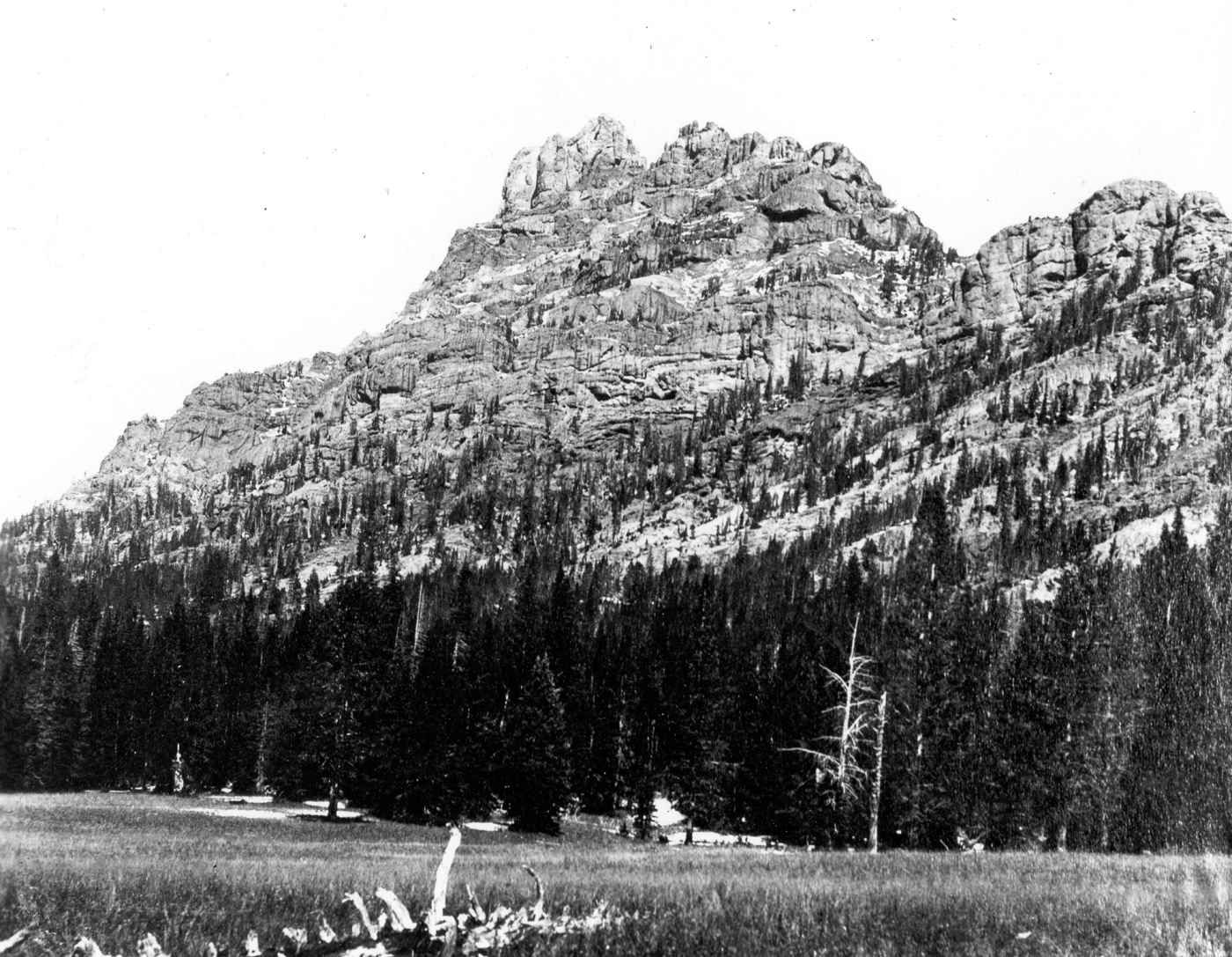
Eagle Peak, c.1890

Eagle Peak wildlife are in the alpine tundra zone and may be threatened by global climate change—the gradual shift of montane fauna and flora upwards could lead to the permanent loss of some species from the park. To the south, on the boundary of the park is Eagle Pass and the Thorofare Plateau, which has a population of elk, moose, deer, bear, bighorn sheep and others and lies along an important north–south migration route for the elk. Flora includes sedges and rushes, and tufted hairgrass in alpine meadows.

== See also ==
- Mountains and mountain ranges of Yellowstone National Park
