= Washakie Needles =

Mountain peak in Wyoming

- Location within Wyoming Location within the United States

Highest point
- Elevation: 12,523 ft (3,817 m)
- Prominence: 1,347 ft (411 m)
- Coordinates: 43°44′51″N 109°12′03″W

Geography
- Location: Hot Springs County, Wyoming, U.S.
- Parent range: Washakie Range
- Topo map: USGS Monument Peak

Climbing
- Easiest route: Scramble

Washakie Needles (12,523 feet (3,817 m)) is the highest peak in the Washakie Range in the U.S. state of Wyoming. Washakie Needles is in the Washakie Wilderness of Shoshone National Forest. The Washakie Range is one of the southern group of mountains within the Absaroka Range, the other being the Owl Creek Mountains. Washakie Needles is only .8 mi (1.3 km) south of the slightly lower Dome Mountain, the second tallest peak in the Washakie Range. Part of the Absaroka volcanic field, the dacites that comprise the summit needles or pillars on Washakie Needles have been dated at 38.8 million years old, and are the youngest volcanic rocks associated with the Absarokas.
