= Mount Humphreys (Wyoming) =

Mountain in Wyoming, United States

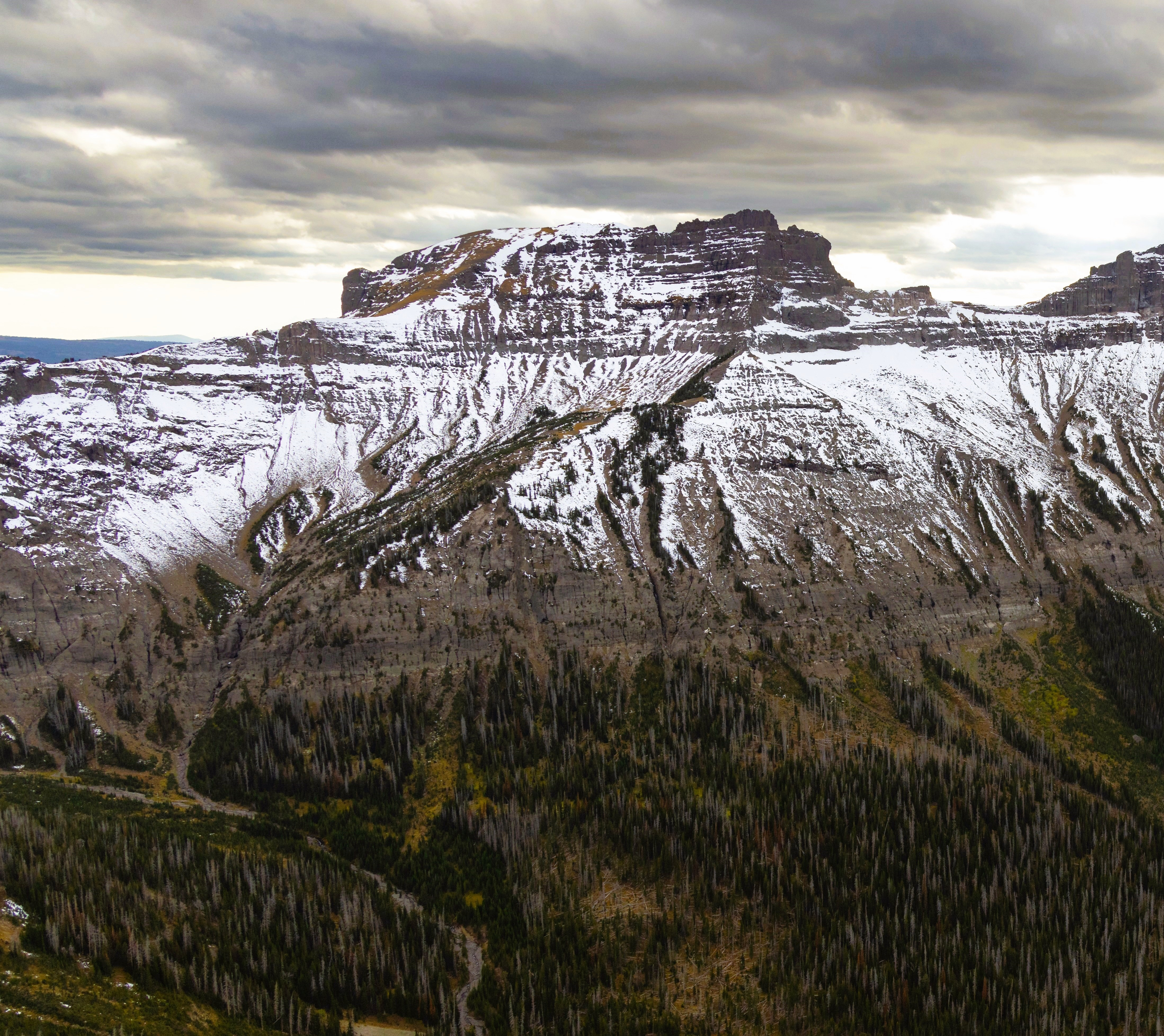
- Northeast aspect

Highest point
- Elevation: 11,019 ft (3,359 m)
- Prominence: 522 ft (159 m)
- Parent peak: Mount Schurz (11,007 ft)
- Isolation: 0.63 mi (1.01 km)
- Coordinates: 44°19′58″N 110°03′43″W

Naming
- Etymology: Andrew A. Humphreys

Geography
- Location within Wyoming Location within the United States
- Country: United States
- State: Wyoming
- County: Park
- Protected area: Yellowstone National Park; Washakie Wilderness
- Parent range: Absaroka Range; Rocky Mountains
- Topo map: USGS Eagle Peak

Geology
- Rock age: Tertiary
- Rock type: Andesitic Volcanic rock

Mount Humphreys is an 11,019-foot-elevation (3,359-meter) mountain summit in Park County, Wyoming, United States.

== Description ==
Mount Humphreys is set on the boundary that Yellowstone National Park shares with Washakie Wilderness. It ranks as the sixth-highest peak in the park. The mountain is located seven miles (11 km) east of Yellowstone Lake, 0.62 miles (1.00 km) southeast of Mount Schurz which is the nearest higher peak, and two miles (3.2 km) northwest of Eagle Peak, the park's highest point. The mountain is part of the Absaroka Range. Precipitation runoff from the mountain's south and west slopes drains into headwaters of Trappers Creek which is a tributary of the Yellowstone River, whereas the northeast slope drains into headwaters of Eagle Creek which is a tributary of the Shoshone River. Topographic relief is significant as the summit rises over 2,600 feet (792 meters) above Eagle Creek in one mile. Volcanoes of the early Eocene supplied the material that formed the mountain 50–55 million years ago, and here created the rugged terrain in Yellowstone Park. The mountain was named in 1871 by Captain J.W. Barlow for General Andrew A. Humphreys (1810–1883), at that time the Chief of Engineers, U.S. Army. Andrew Humphreys supported Ferdinand Vandeveer Hayden's 1871 survey of Yellowstone, and later was helpful in establishing the United States Geological Survey. The mountain's toponym was officially adopted in 1930 by the United States Board on Geographic Names.

== Climate ==
According to the Köppen climate classification system, Mount Humphreys is located in a subarctic climate zone with long, cold, snowy winters, and cool to warm summers. Winter temperatures can drop below 0 °F with wind chill factors below −10 °F.

== Gallery ==
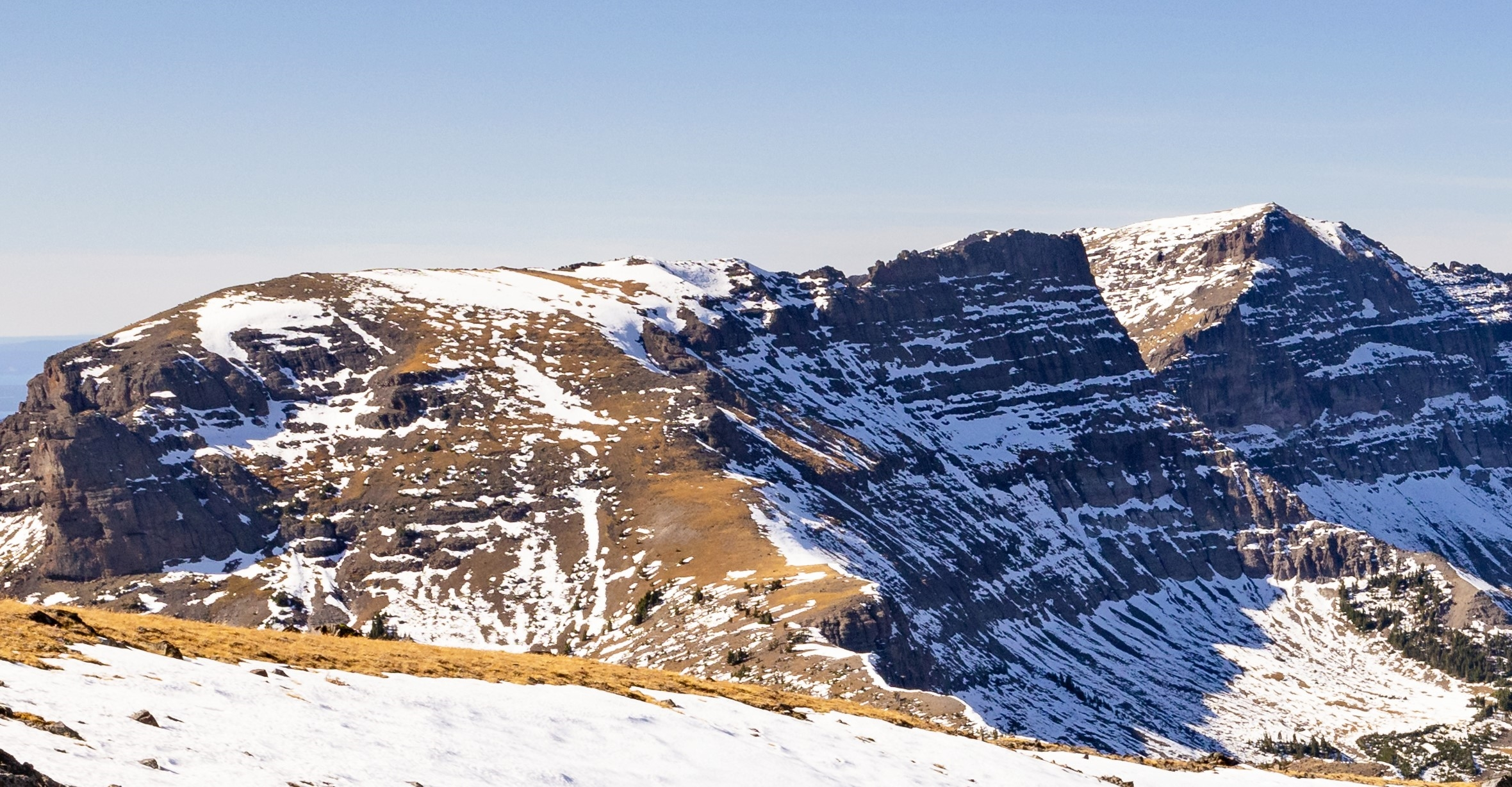
Southeast aspect of Mt. Humphreys, (with Mt. Schurz to right)

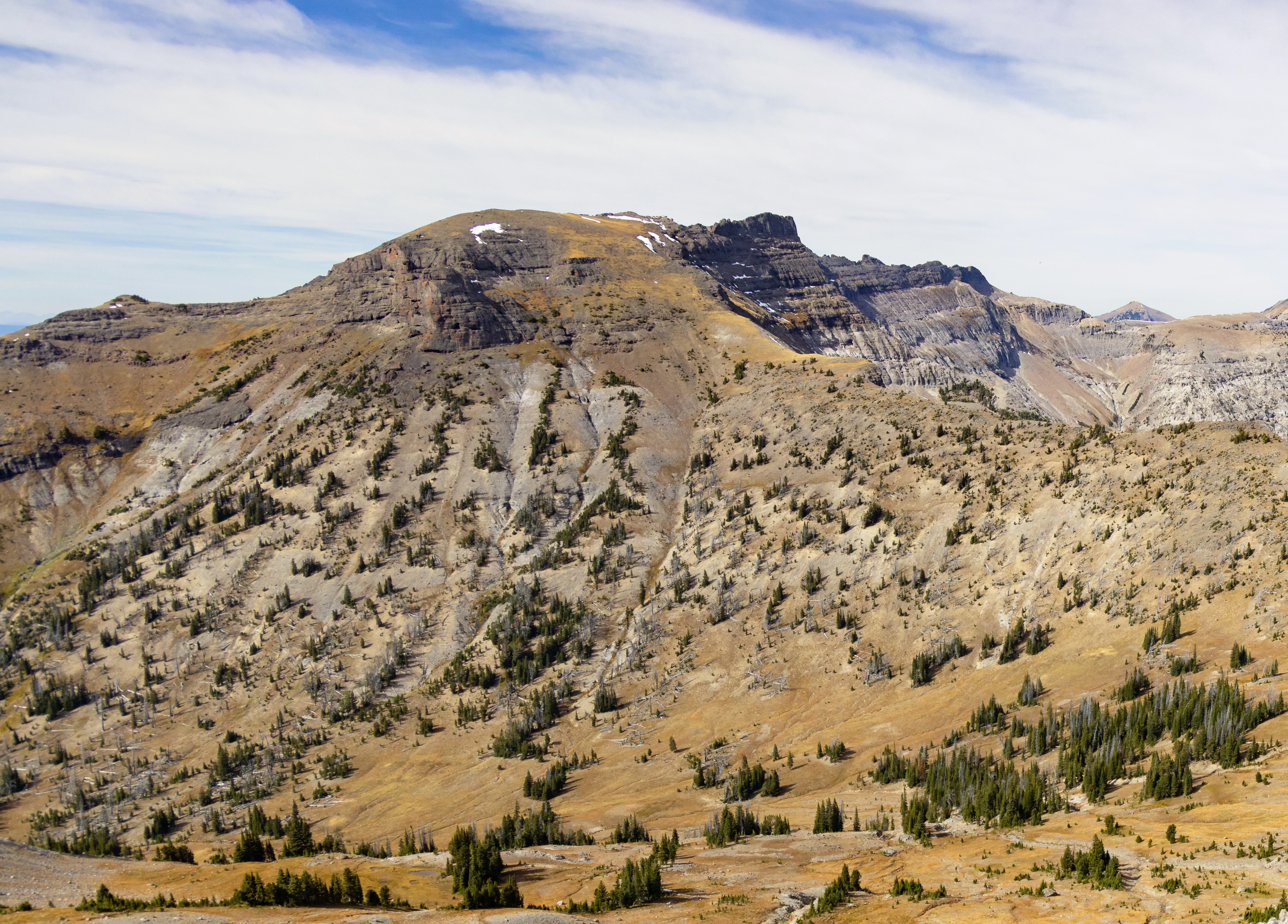
South aspect

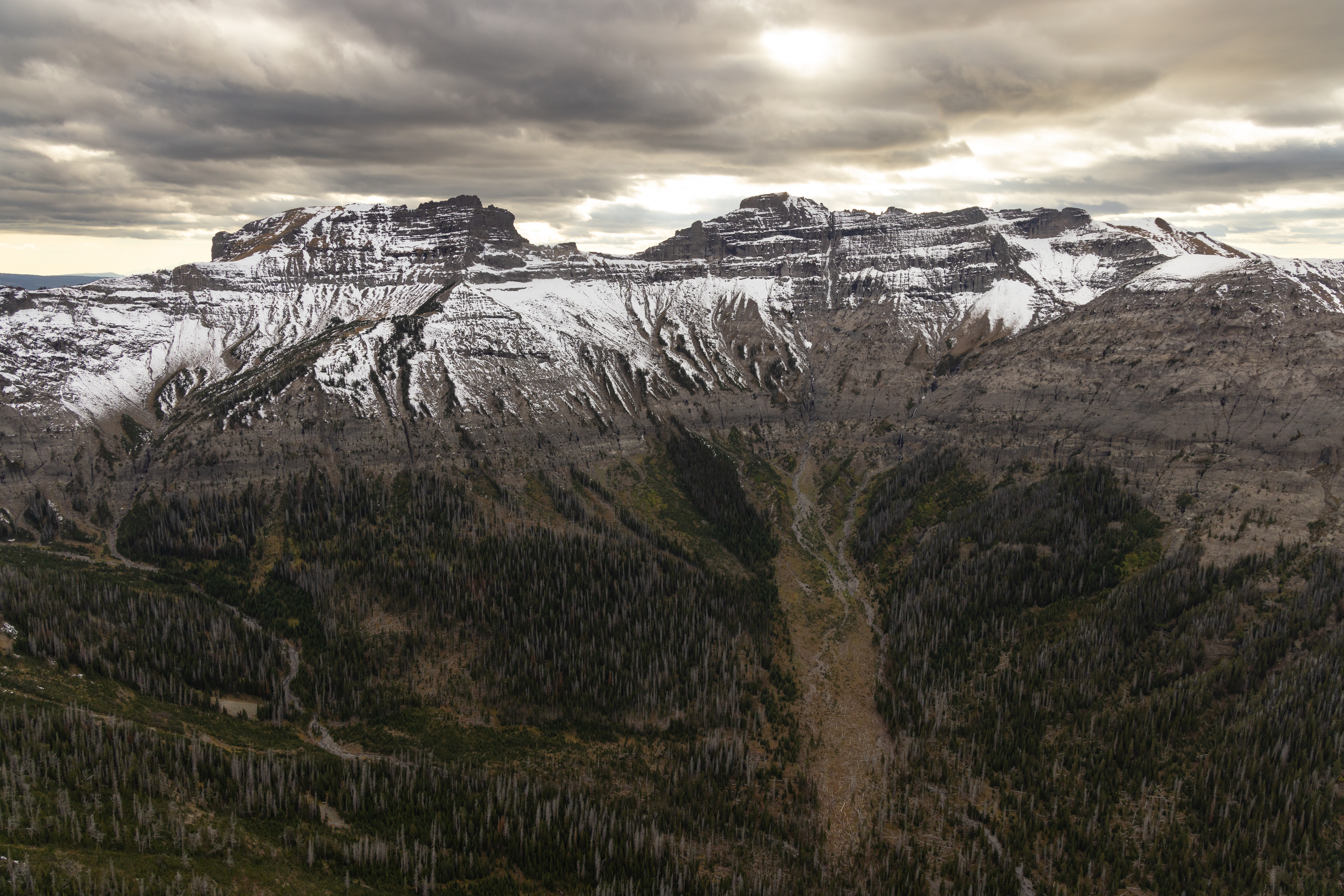
Mount Humphreys (left) and Mount Schurz (right) viewed from northeast above Eagle Creek drainage.

== See also ==
- List of mountains and mountain ranges of Yellowstone National Park
