= Antelope Valley (Eureka County) =

Valley in Eureka County, Nevada, United States

- Location within Nevada
- Length: 35 mi (56 km)

Geography
- Country: United States
- State: Nevada
- Region: Great Basin
- Counties: Eureka; Nye
- Population center: Eureka
- Coordinates: 39°30′N 116°18.0′W
- Interactive map of Antelope Valley

The Antelope Valley of southern Eureka County is a small 35 mi (56 km) long valley, surrounded by four mountain ranges. Antelope Wash flows north, to endorheic flatlands at the valley's north end. Eureka, Nevada lies 20 mi east nestled among mountain ranges. From Eureka U.S. Route 50 travels west through the north end of the valley on a route to Austin.

== Description ==
Antelope Valley is about 35 miles (56 km) long, north-south trending, and lies at the northeast foothills of the extensive north-south Monitor Range. The southeast portion is within the Toiyabe National Forest.

Antelope Valley begins as Antelope Wash in northern Nye County between the Monitor Range and the Antelope Range. The headwaters of the valley begin as a narrow mountain valley on the north side of a water divide about 6.3 miles (10.1 km) south of the Nye-Eureka line. Antelope Valley broadens to about 9 miles (14 km) wide at about 23 miles (37 km) to the north. Thereafter Antelope Valley merges with the Monitor Valley from the west and the Kobeh Valley from the north to become a broad basin between the Monitor and Simpson Park ranges to the west, Roberts Mountains to the north and the Antelope, Fish Creek and Mountain Boy ranges to the southeast. The combined valleys form a broad basin about 30 kilometres (19 mi) in diameter.

The isolated Lone Mountain within the southeastern portion of the valley separates Antelope and Kobeh valleys. Lone Mountain is about 3.5 miles (5.6 km) in diameter at its base and reaches an elevation of 7,936 feet (2,419 m) at its peak. This is about 1900 feet above the valley floor.

Stream drainage from Antelope Wash and from a number of streams from the Roberts Mountains merge to the southwest of Lone Mountain to form Slough Creek which flows to the east to disappear in Hay Meadow just to the southeast of Lone Mountain making the combined valley an endorheic system. Slough Creek re-emerges about 3 miles (4.8 km) to the east to continue through the narrow Devils Gate pass alongside highway 50. The pass is a narrow 500 feet (150 m) wide gap between Whistler Mountain to the north and the north end of the Mountain Boy Range to the south.
