= Bartine =

Bartine may also refer to:

- Bartine Burkett (1898–1994), American film actress
- Horace F. Bartine (1848–1918), American politician from Nevada
- Bartine Hot Springs, Nevada, United States
