= Table Mountain (Nye County, Nevada) =

Mountain in Nevada, United States

- Location within Nevada

Highest point
- Elevation: 10,649 ft (3,246 m)
- Prominence: 3,648 ft (1,112 m)
- Isolation: 16.95 mi (27.28 km)
- Coordinates: 38°46′21″N 116°35′04″W

Geography
- Location: Nye County, Nevada, United States
- Parent range: Monitor Range

Table Mountain, at 10,649 feet (3,246 m) is the highest summit of the Monitor Range in south-central Nevada in the United States. It is located within the Humboldt-Toiyabe National Forest, about 50 miles (80 km) northeast of Tonopah. The Table Mountain Wilderness is named after it.

== See also ==
- List of mountain peaks of Nevada
