= Simpson Park Mountains =

Mountain range in Nevada, US

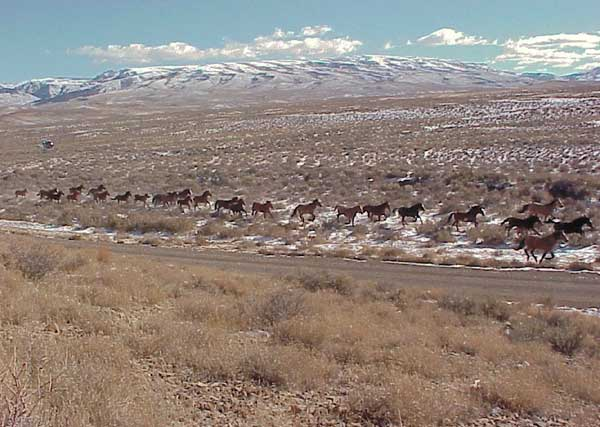
- Horses crossing a plain near the Simpson Park Wilderness Study Area

Highest point
- Peak: Fagan Mountain
- Elevation: 2,788 m (9,147 ft)
- Coordinates: 39°45.05′N 116°34.83′W

Dimensions
- Length: 47.7 mi (76.8 km) NNE-SSW
- Width: 6.2 mi (10.0 km)

Geography
- Location within Nevada
- Country: United States
- State: Nevada
- Region: Basin and Range
- District(s): Eureka and Lander counties
- Range coordinates: 39°44.86′N 116°36.52′W
- Topo map(s): USGS Crescent Valley, Simpson Park and Summit Mountain 30x60 quads

The Simpson Park Mountains, also known as the Simpson Park Range, are located in Lander and Eureka counties, in central Nevada in the western United States. The mountains reach an elevation of 9,147 feet (2,788 m) at Fagin Mountain, and cover an area of approximately 310 square miles (800 km^{2}). US Route 50 crosses the very southern end of the range at Hickison Summit between Eureka and Austin.

The range runs in a southwest-northeasterly direction between the Toiyabe Range on the west across Grass Valley and the Roberts Mountains to the east. Other ranges around the Simpson Parks include the Cortez Mountains to the north across Horse Creek Valley and the Toquima and Monitor ranges to the south. The Monitor, Kobeh and Antelope valleys lie to the southeast.

The Hickison Petroglyph Recreation Area lies at the southeastern end of the mountains northwest of Hickison Summit on US route 50. The Bureau of Land Management manages 98% of the Simpson Park Mountains, and 2% is privately held. Principal vegetation types are: Piñon-juniper—43.5%, Sagebrush scrub—25.4%, and Sagebrush steppe—18.5%. Trees found in the range include: western juniper (Juniperus occidentalis), Utah Juniper (Juniperus osteosperma), and Single-leaf Pinyon (Pinus monophylla). Coyotes and pikas roam the Simpson Park Mountains.

The range is named after James H. Simpson, who surveyed a transportation route just south of the range in 1858.
