= Table Mountain Glacier =

Glacier in Washington, United States

- Location within Washington (state)
- Type: Cirque glacier
- Location: Whatcom County, Washington, U.S.
- Coordinates: 48°51′00″N 121°42′26″W
- Length: 600 ft (180 m)
- Terminus: Barren rock/Proglacial lake
- Status: Retreating

Table Mountain Glacier is in Snoqualmie National Forest in the U.S. state of Washington, to the east of Table Mountain. This small glacier is less than .50 mi (0.80 km) west of Artist Point and situated on the north slope of Table Mountain.

== See also ==
- List of glaciers in the United States
