= Dome Mountain (Hot Springs County, Wyoming) =

Mountain in Wyoming, United States

- Location within Wyoming Location within the United States

Highest point
- Elevation: 12,455 ft (3,796 m)
- Prominence: 610 ft (190 m)
- Coordinates: 43°45′29″N 109°12′32″W

Geography
- Location: Hot Springs County, Wyoming, U.S.
- Parent range: Washakie Range
- Topo map: USGS Twin Peaks

Climbing
- Easiest route: Scramble

Dome Mountain (12,455 feet (3,796 m)) is the highest peak in the Washakie Range in the U.S. state of Wyoming. Dome Mountain is in the Washakie Wilderness of Shoshone National Forest.

== Background ==
The Washakie Range is one of the southern groups of mountains within the Absaroka Range, the other being the Owl Creek Mountains. Dome Mountain is the second tallest peak in the Washakie Range and is only .8 mi (1.3 km) north of Washakie Needles, which is the tallest.
