= Table Mountain (Yellowstone National Park) =

Mountain in Wyoming, United States

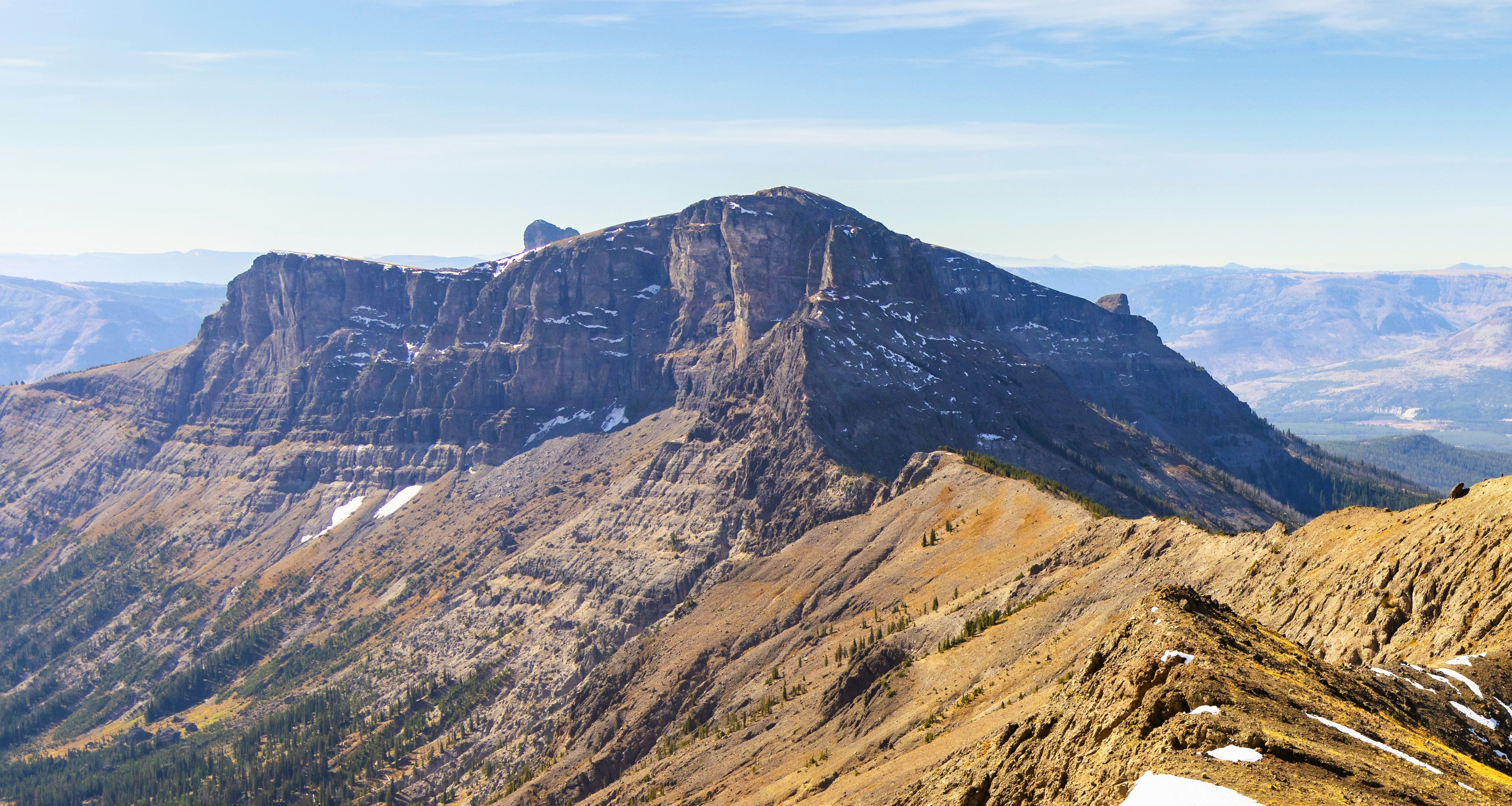
- North-northeast aspect

Highest point
- Elevation: 11,069 ft (3,374 m)
- Prominence: 965 ft (294 m)
- Parent peak: Eagle Peak (11,372 ft)
- Isolation: 2.18 mi (3.51 km)
- Coordinates: 44°17′45″N 110°03′19″W

Geography
- Location within Wyoming Location within the United States
- Country: United States
- State: Wyoming
- County: Park
- Protected area: Yellowstone National Park
- Parent range: Absaroka Range; Rocky Mountains
- Topo map: USGS Eagle Peak

Geology
- Rock age: Tertiary
- Rock type: Andesitic Volcanic rock

Table Mountain is an 11,069-foot-elevation (3,374-meter) mountain summit in Park County, Wyoming, United States.

== Description ==
Table Mountain is set in Yellowstone National Park and ranks as the third-highest peak in the park. The mountain is located eight miles (13 km) southeast of Yellowstone Lake, and 2.18 miles (3.51 km) southwest of Eagle Peak which is the nearest higher peak, as well as the park's highest point. Table Mountain is the highest mountain entirely within the park because Eagle Peak and Mount Schurz (second highest) are set on the park's boundary with their respective slopes partially outside the park. The mountain is part of the Absaroka Range. Precipitation runoff from the mountain's slopes drains into Trappers, Howell, and Mountain creeks which are tributaries of the Yellowstone River. Topographic relief is significant as the summit rises 2,670 feet (814 meters) above Trappers Creek in 1.35 miles (2.17 km). Volcanoes of the early Eocene supplied the material that formed the mountain 50–55 million years ago, and here created the rugged terrain in Yellowstone Park. The mountain's descriptive name was applied in 1885 by the U.S. Geological Survey, and the toponym was officially adopted on May 7, 1930, by the United States Board on Geographic Names.

== Climate ==
According to the Köppen climate classification system, Table Mountain is located in a subarctic climate zone with long, cold, snowy winters, and cool to warm summers. Winter temperatures can drop below 0 °F with wind chill factors below −10 °F.

== See also ==
- List of mountains and mountain ranges of Yellowstone National Park
