= Dome Mountain (Toonumbar) =

Mountain in Australia

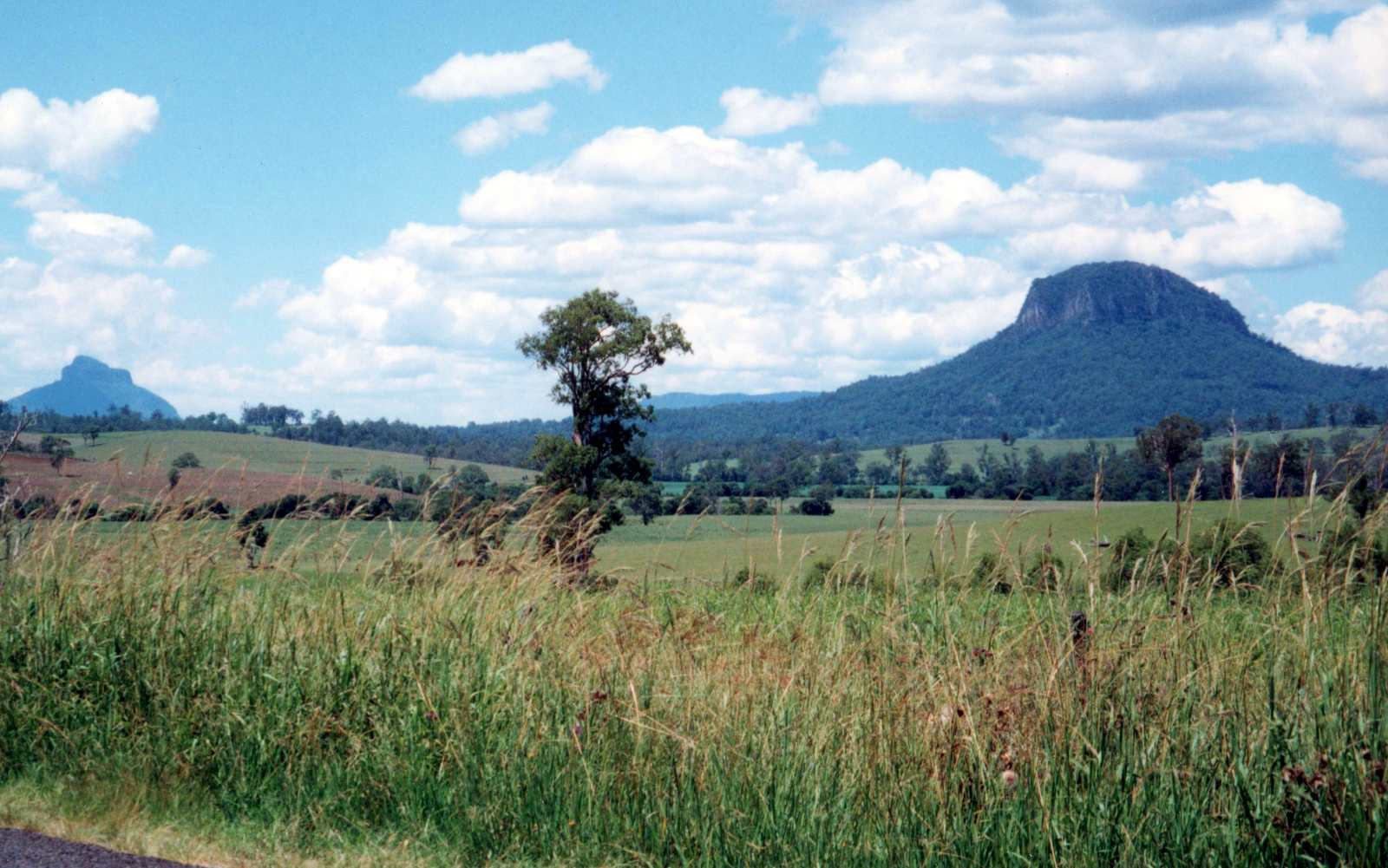

Highest point
- Elevation: 915 m (3,002 ft)
- Coordinates: 28°28′28″S 152°41′44″E

Geography
- Location within New South Wales
- Location: Northern Rivers, New South Wales, Australia

Dome Mountain is a mountain located in the north east of New South Wales, Australia. The closest large town is Kyogle. The mountain is within the World Heritage listed Toonumbar National Park. Sub tropical rainforest nearby contains many species of plants, including the black booyong and pigeonberry ash.

== See also ==
- List of mountains of New South Wales
