= Mount Hermann =

Mountain in Washington (state), United States

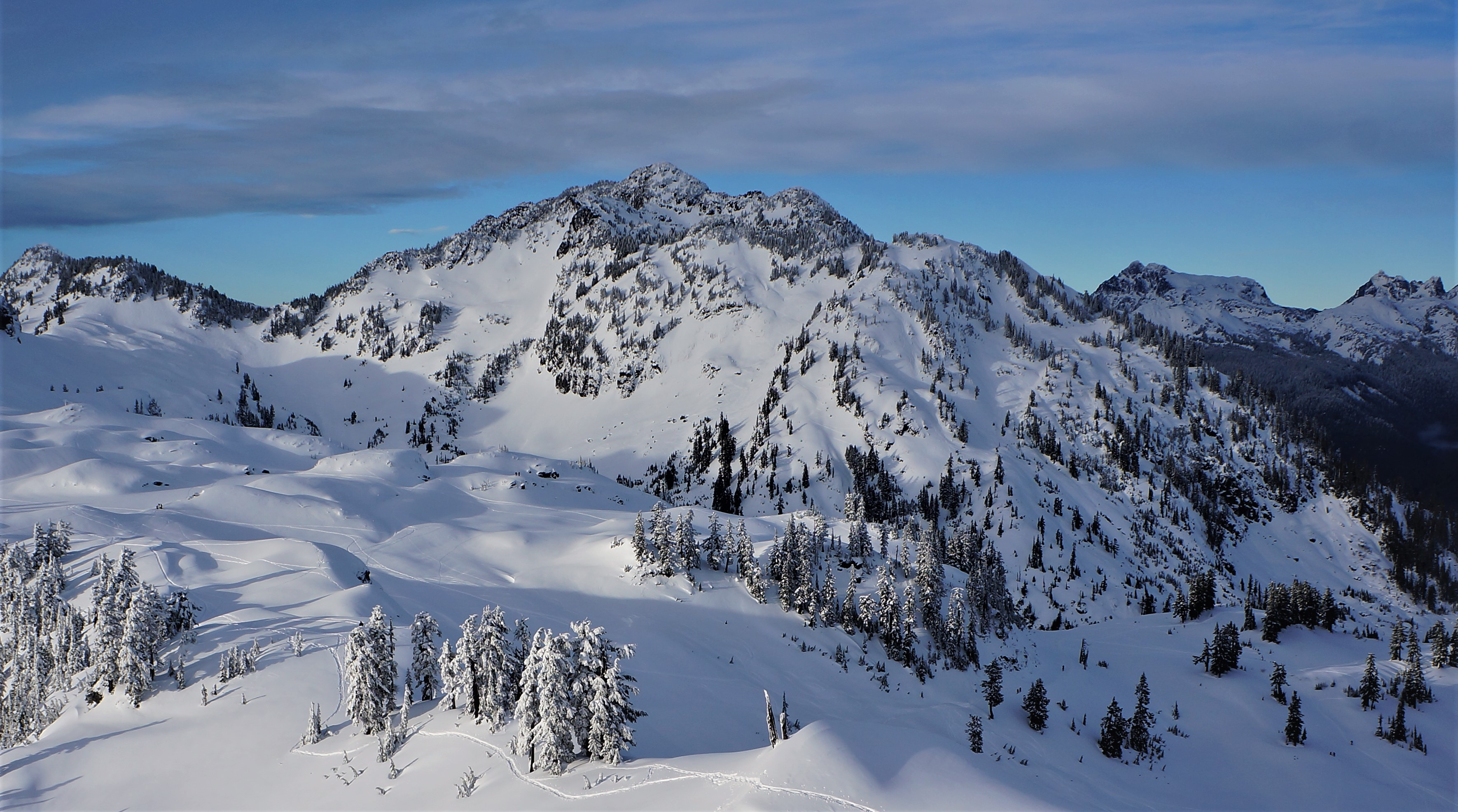
- Southeast aspect

Highest point
- Elevation: 6,240 ft (1,902 m)
- Prominence: 1,120 ft (341 m)
- Parent peak: Lasiocarpa Ridge
- Isolation: 3.55 mi (5.71 km)
- Coordinates: 48°51′58″N 121°42′09″W

Geography
- Location within Washington (state) Location within the United States
- Interactive map of Mount Hermann
- Country: United States
- State: Washington
- County: Whatcom
- Protected area: Mount Baker Wilderness
- Parent range: Cascade Range; North Cascades; Skagit Range
- Topo map: USGS Shuksan Arm

Geology
- Volcanic arc: Cascade Volcanic Arc

Mount Hermann is a 6,240+ ft (1,900+ m) Skagit Range summit located northwest of Mount Shuksan and northeast of Mount Baker, in the North Cascades of Washington state. It is situated in the Mount Baker Wilderness, on land managed by Mount Baker-Snoqualmie National Forest. Mount Hermann is located immediately west of the Mt. Baker Ski Area, at the end of the Mount Baker Highway. Precipitation runoff from the mountain drains into tributaries of the Nooksack River. This peak is named for Binger Hermann (1843–1926), head of the United States General Land Office. This geographic feature has also had variant names "Mount Herman", and "Herman Peak". The present toponym and spelling was officially adopted in 1988 by the U.S. Board on Geographic Names.

== Climate ==
Mount Hermann is located in the marine west coast climate zone of western North America. Weather fronts originating in the Pacific Ocean travel northeast toward the Cascade Mountains. As fronts approach the North Cascades, they are forced upward by the peaks of the Cascade Range (orographic lift), causing them to drop their moisture in the form of rain or snowfall onto the Cascades. As a result, the west side of the North Cascades experiences high precipitation, especially during the winter months in the form of snowfall. Because of maritime influence, snow tends to be wet and heavy, resulting in high avalanche danger. During winter months, weather is usually cloudy, but, due to high pressure systems over the Pacific Ocean that intensify during summer months, there is often little or no cloud cover during the summer. The months July through September offer the most favorable weather for viewing or climbing this peak.

Mount Hermann is situated immediately west of the Mt. Baker Ski Area, which recorded the world's greatest snowfall for one season, 1,140 inches (95.0 ft; 29.0 m), during the 1998–1999 season.

== Geology ==
The North Cascades features some of the most rugged topography in the Cascade Range with craggy peaks, ridges, and deep glacial valleys. Geological events occurring many years ago created the diverse topography and drastic elevation changes over the Cascade Range leading to the various climate differences.

The history of the formation of the Cascade Mountains dates back millions of years ago to the late Eocene Epoch. With the North American Plate overriding the Pacific Plate, episodes of volcanic igneous activity persisted. Mount Baker, a stratovolcano that is 8 mi (13 km) southwest of Mount Hermann, began forming in the Pleistocene. In addition, small fragments of the oceanic and continental lithosphere called terranes created the North Cascades about 50 million years ago.

During the Pleistocene period dating back over two million years ago, glaciation advancing and retreating repeatedly scoured the landscape leaving deposits of rock debris. The U-shaped cross section of the river valleys is a result of recent glaciation. Uplift and faulting in combination with glaciation have been the dominant processes which have created the tall peaks and deep valleys of the North Cascades area.

== Gallery ==
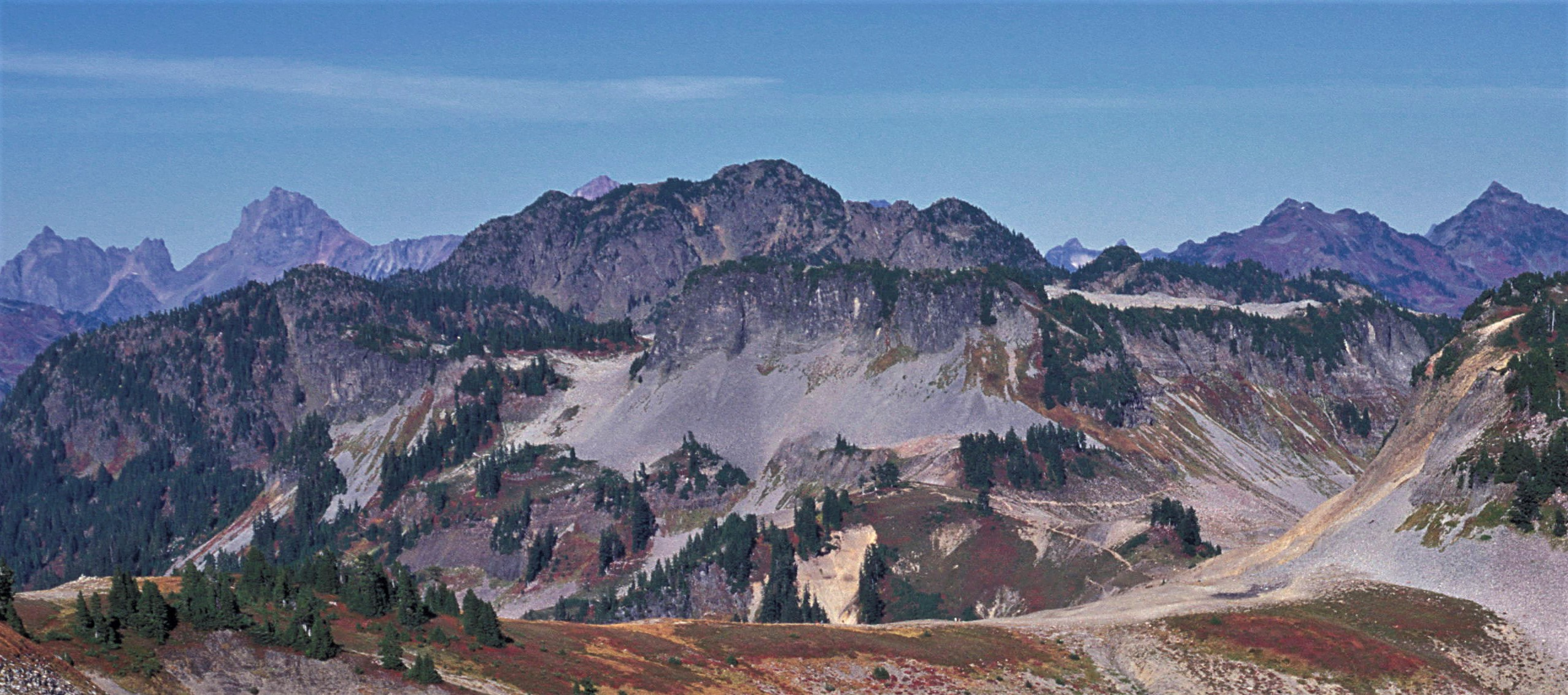
Mount Hermann centered above Table Mountain

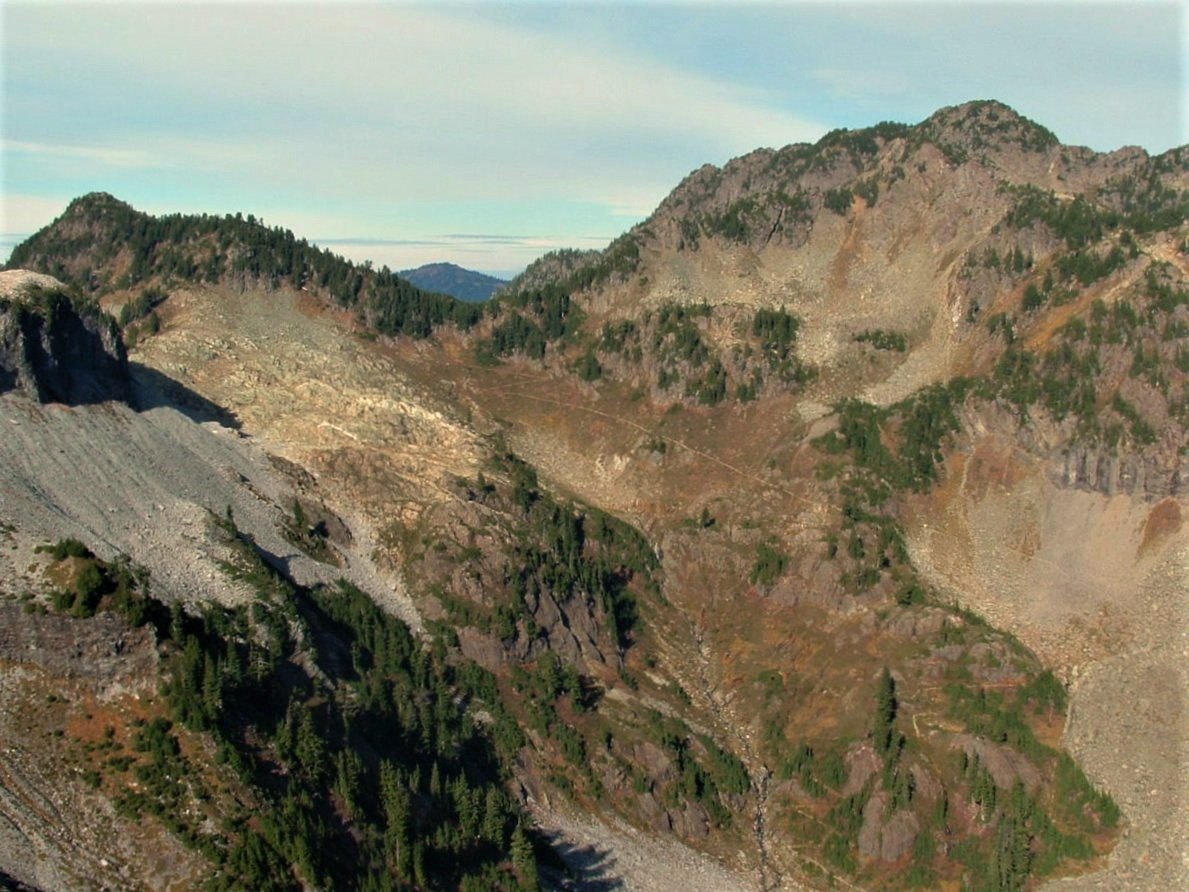
Mt. Hermann upper right, from Table Mountain

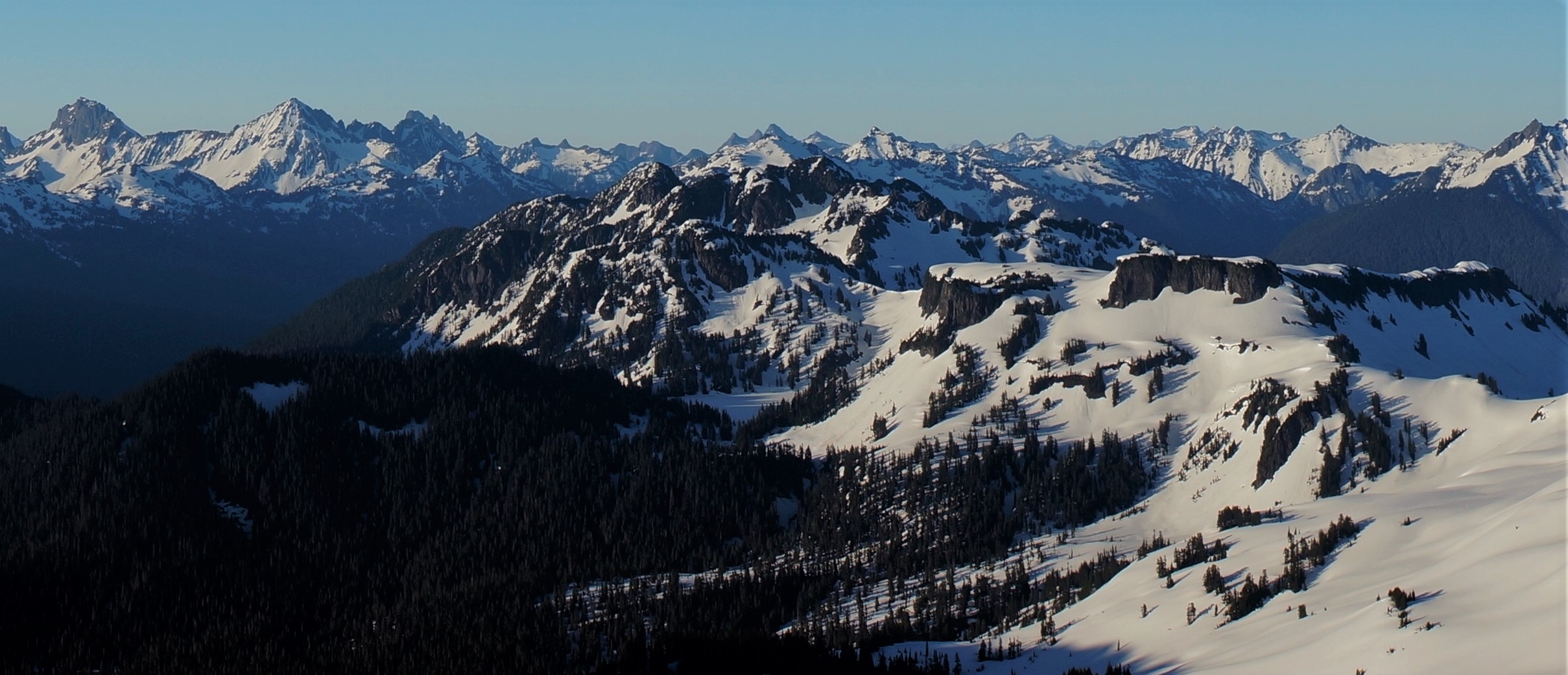
Mount Hermann centered, Table Mountain right

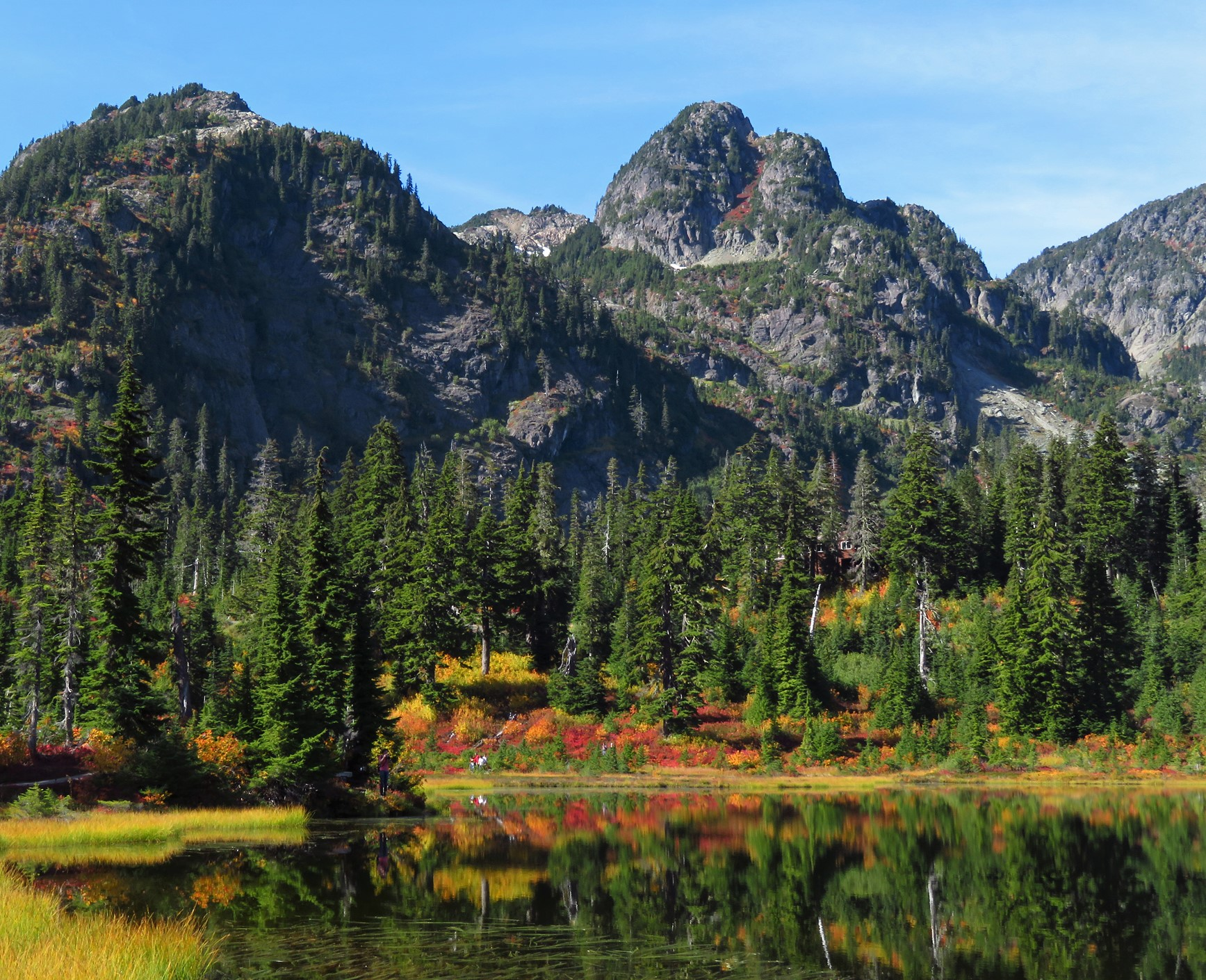
Mt. Hermann

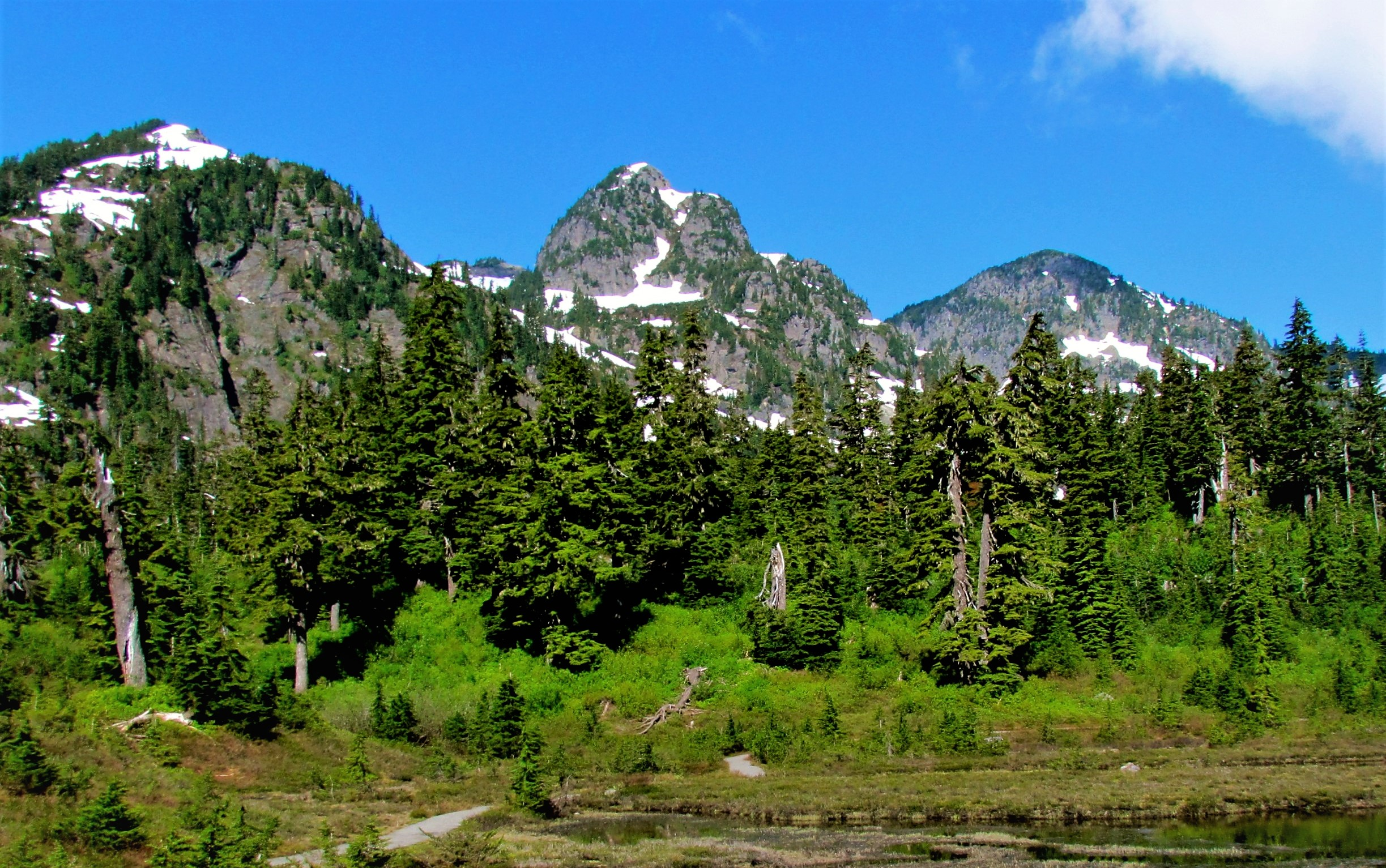
Mt. Hermann

== See also ==
- Geology of the Pacific Northwest
- Geography of the North Cascades
