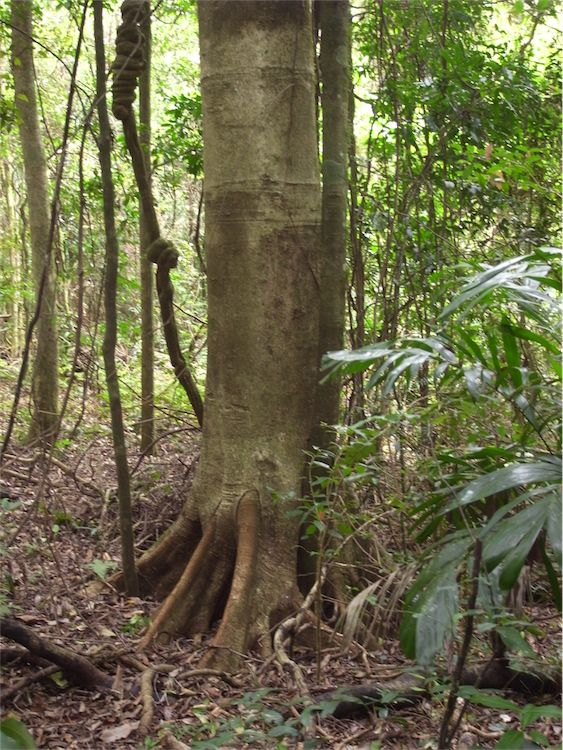
- In the Richmond Range National Park

Conservation status
- Least Concern (IUCN 3.1)

Scientific classification
- Kingdom: Plantae
- Clade: Tracheophytes
- Clade: Angiosperms
- Clade: Magnoliids
- Order: Laurales
- Family: Lauraceae
- Genus: Cryptocarya
- Species: C. erythroxylon

Binomial name
- Cryptocarya erythroxylon Maiden & Betche ex Maiden

= Cryptocarya erythroxylon =

Species of tree

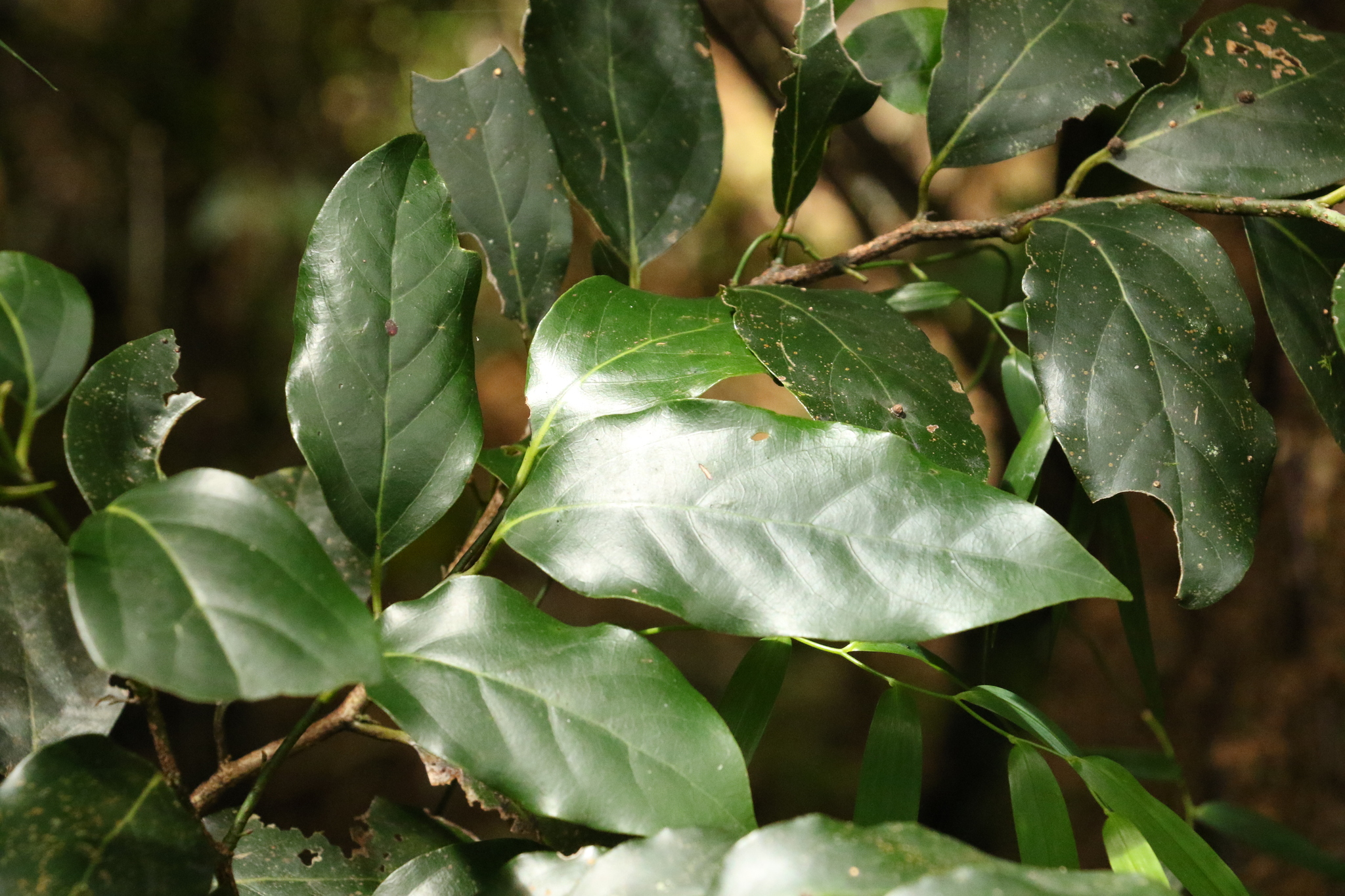
Leaves in Springbrook National Park

Cryptocarya erythroxylon commonly known as rose maple, rose walnut, pigeonberry ash, red-wooded cryptocarya, southern maple or bottleberry, is a species of flowering plant in the laurel family and is endemic to eastern Australia. Its leaves are elliptic to lance-shaped the flowers cream-coloured and tube-shaped, and the fruit a pear-shaped black drupe.

== Description ==
Cryptocarya erythroxylon is a tree that typically grows to a height of up to 30 m (98 ft), its stem usually buttressed. Its leaves are elliptic to lance-shaped, 65–145 mm (2.6–5.7 in) long and 15–60 mm (0.59–2.36 in) wide on a petiole 8–19 mm (0.31–0.75 in) long. The lower surface of the leaves is glaucous. The flowers are cream-coloured and arranged in panicles shorter than the leaves. The perianth tube is about 0.9 mm (0.035 in) long and 1.5 mm (0.059 in) wide, the outer tepals 1.2 mm (0.047 in) long and 0.8 mm (0.031 in) wide, the inner tepals 1.4 mm (0.055 in) long and 1 mm (0.039 in) wide. Flowering occurs in November, and the fruit is a pear-shaped black drupe, 19.5–21 mm (0.77–0.83 in) long and 13–15 mm (0.51–0.59 in) wide.

== Taxonomy ==
Cryptocarya erythroxylon was first formally described in 1907 by Joseph Maiden in The Forest Flora of New South Wales, from an unpublished description by Maiden and Ernst Betche of a tree discovered by William Dunn in the "Macpherson Range".

== Distribution and habitat ==
Rose maple grows in subtropical rainforest in coastal ranges at elevations at 500–1,050 m (1,640–3,440 ft) between Gympie in Queensland and Barrington Tops in New South Wales.
