= Kobeh Valley =

Coordinates: 39°40′00″N 116°14′15″W

Kobeh Valley is a valley in Eureka County, Nevada, United States.

Kobeh is a name derived from the Shoshoni language meaning "face".
