= Table Mountain (Churchill County, Nevada) =

Mountain in the state of Nevada

Coordinates: 39°32′29″N 118°17′58″W

Table Mountain is a summit in the U.S. state of Nevada. The elevation is 8,271 feet (2,521 m).

Table Mountain was so named on account of the level plateau at its peak.
