= Täfelberg =

Mountain of Baden-Württemberg, Germany

Coordinates: 48°43′N 8°47′E

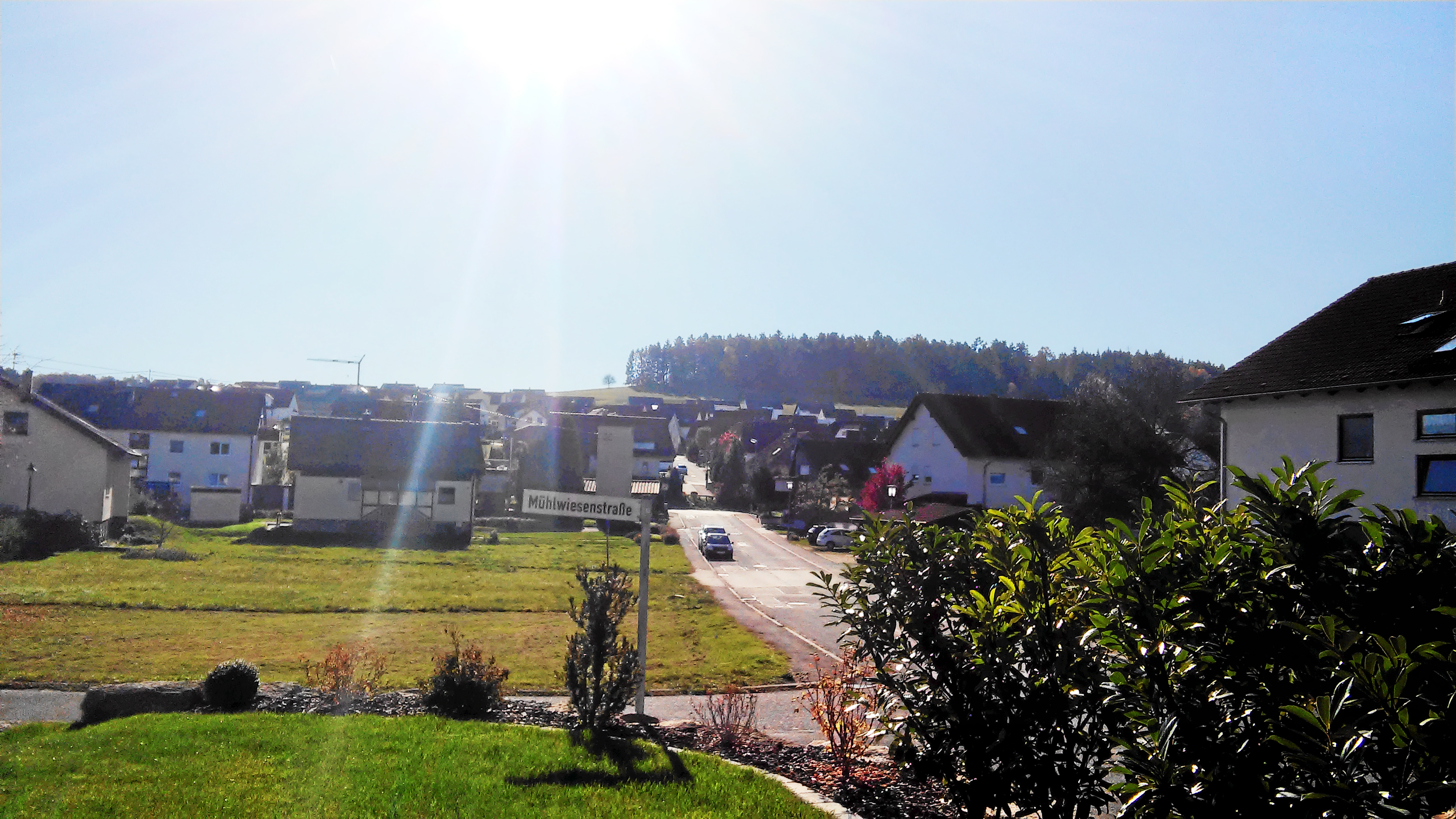

Highest point
- Elevation: 565 m (1,854 ft)

Geography
- Location: Baden-Württemberg, Germany

Täfelberg is a mountain of Baden-Württemberg, Germany.
