= Dome Mountain (Colorado) =

Mountain in Colorado, United States

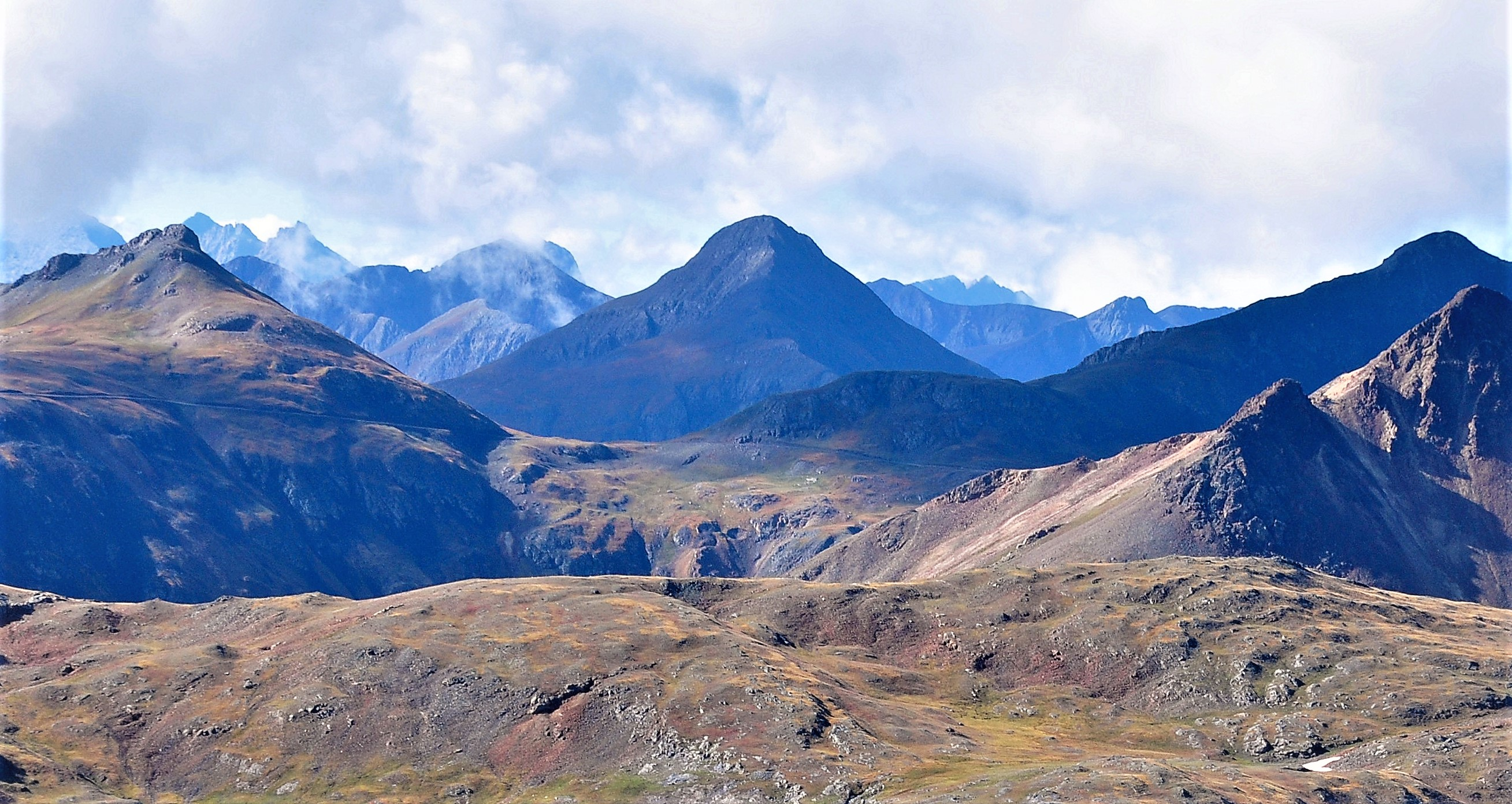
- North aspect, centered

Highest point
- Elevation: 13,379 ft (4,078 m)
- Prominence: 656 ft (200 m)
- Parent peak: Tower Mountain (13,558 ft)
- Isolation: 1.27 mi (2.04 km)
- Coordinates: 37°51′39″N 107°36′00″W

Geography
- Location within Colorado Location within the United States
- Country: United States
- State: Colorado
- County: San Juan
- Parent range: Rocky Mountains; San Juan Mountains
- Topo map: USGS Howardsville

Climbing
- Easiest route: class 2 hiking

Dome Mountain is a 13,379-foot-elevation (4,078-meter) summit located in San Juan County, Colorado, United States.

== Description ==
Dome Mountain is situated five miles (8 km) northeast of the town of Silverton on land administered by the Bureau of Land Management. It is set five miles west of the Continental Divide in the San Juan Mountains which are a subrange of the Rocky Mountains. Precipitation runoff from the mountain drains into the Animas River and topographic relief is significant as the summit rises nearly 3,700 feet (1,100 meters) above the river in 1.25 mile (2 km). The mountain's toponym has been officially adopted by the United States Board on Geographic Names, and has been recorded in publications since at least 1906.

== Climate ==
According to the Köppen climate classification system, Dome Mountain is located in an alpine subarctic climate zone with cold, snowy winters, and cool to warm summers. Due to its altitude, it receives precipitation all year, as snow in winter and as thunderstorms in summer, with a dry period in late spring. Climbers can expect afternoon rain, hail, and lightning from the seasonal monsoon in late July and August.

== See also ==
- Mountains of San Juan County, Colorado
- Thirteener
