= Table Mountain (Whatcom County, Washington) =

Mountain in Washington (state), United States

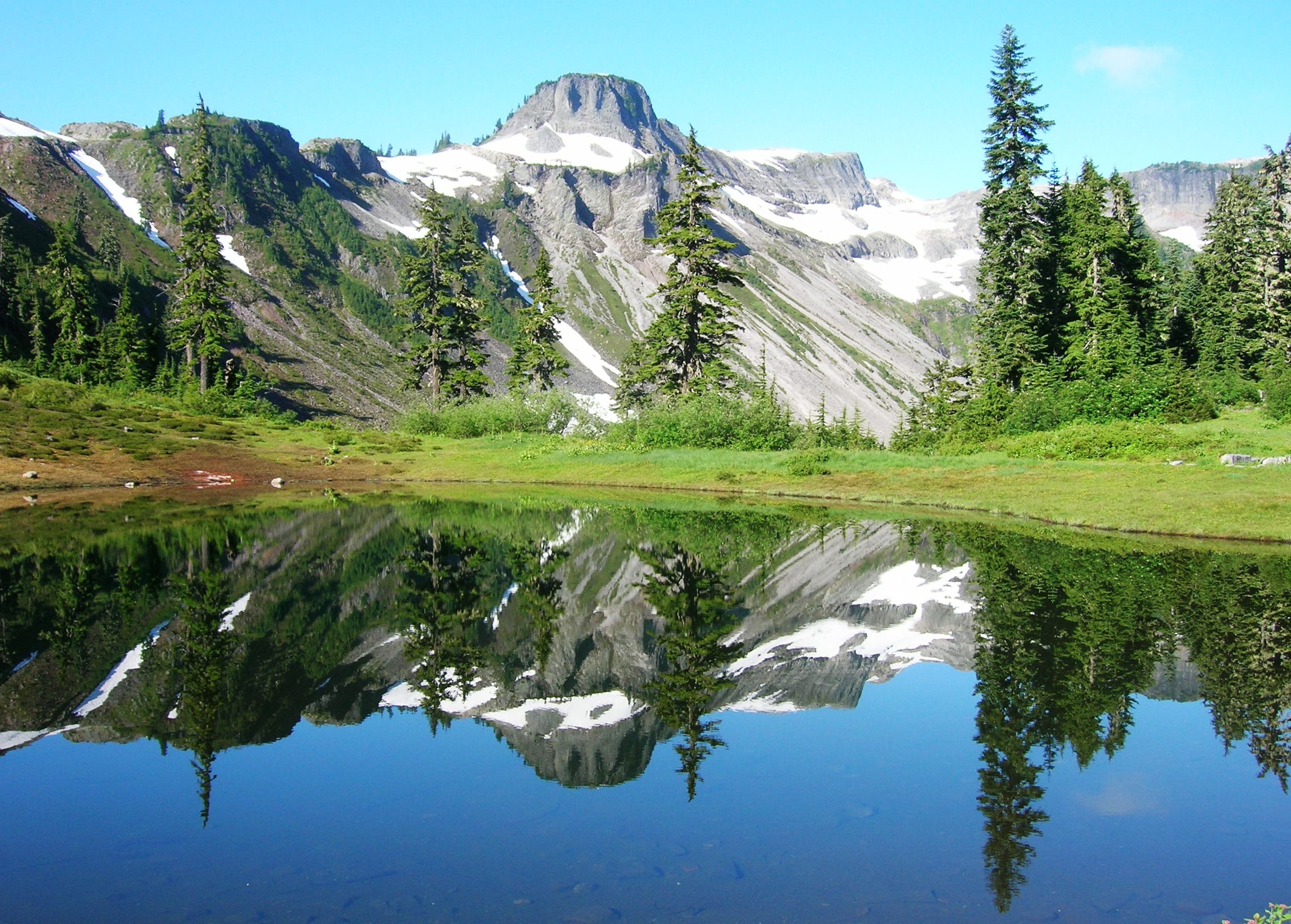
- Table Mountain seen from Austin Pass

Highest point
- Elevation: 5,742 ft (1,750 m)
- Prominence: 422 ft (129 m)
- Parent peak: Mazama Dome (5,820 ft)
- Isolation: 0.84 mi (1.35 km)
- Coordinates: 48°50′52″N 121°42′49″W

Geography
- Location within Washington (state) Location within the United States
- Interactive map of Table Mountain
- Country: United States
- State: Washington
- County: Whatcom
- Protected area: Mount Baker Wilderness
- Parent range: North Cascades
- Topo map: USGS Shuksan Arm

Geology
- Rock type: Andesite lava
- Volcanic arc: Cascade Volcanic Arc

Climbing
- Easiest route: Hiking trail

Table Mountain is a Skagit Range summit located west of Mount Shuksan and northeast of Mount Baker in the North Cascades of Washington state. It is situated in the Mount Baker Wilderness, which is managed by the Mount Baker-Snoqualmie National Forest. Table Mountain is located west of Artist Point, at the end of the Mount Baker Highway. From the Artist Point parking lot, a short 1.4 mile trail leads to the summit at the west end of the mountain. The summit offers views of Mount Shuksan, Mount Baker, Mount Hermann, and Mount Larrabee. Remnants of the Table Mountain Glacier are on the northeast slope. Precipitation runoff from the mountain drains into tributaries of the Skagit and Nooksack Rivers.

== Climate ==
Table Mountain is located in the marine west coast climate zone of western North America. Weather fronts originating in the Pacific Ocean travel northeast toward the Cascade Mountains. As fronts approach the North Cascades, they are forced upward by the peaks of the Cascade Range (orographic lift), causing them to drop their moisture in the form of rain or snowfall onto the Cascades. As a result, the west side of the North Cascades experiences high precipitation, especially during the winter months in the form of snowfall. Table Mountain is situated above the Mt. Baker Ski Area, which recorded the world's greatest snowfall for one season, 1,140 inches (95.0 ft; 29.0 m), which was recorded during the 1998–1999 season. Because of maritime influence, snow tends to be wet and heavy, resulting in high avalanche danger. During winter months, weather is usually cloudy, but, due to high pressure systems over the Pacific Ocean that intensify during summer months, there is often little or no cloud cover during the summer.

== Geology ==
The North Cascades features some of the most rugged topography in the Cascade Range with craggy peaks, ridges, and deep glacial valleys. Geological events occurring many years ago created the diverse topography and drastic elevation changes over the Cascade Range leading to the various climate differences.

The history of the formation of the Cascade Mountains dates back millions of years ago to the late Eocene Epoch. With the North American Plate overriding the Pacific Plate, episodes of volcanic igneous activity persisted. Mount Baker, a stratovolcano that is 6.7 mi (10.8 km) southwest of Table Mountain, began forming in the Pleistocene. In addition, small fragments of the oceanic and continental lithosphere called terranes created the North Cascades about 50 million years ago.

During the Pleistocene period dating back over two million years ago, glaciation advancing and retreating repeatedly scoured the landscape leaving deposits of rock debris. The U-shaped cross section of the river valleys is a result of recent glaciation. Uplift and faulting in combination with glaciation have been the dominant processes which have created the tall peaks and deep valleys of the North Cascades area.

Table Mountain is an andesite lava flow which was so thick that geologists think it must have flowed into a constraining canyon in which the molten rock formed a lava lake. Because of the wild, crazy columnar joints that occur along the sides of Table Mountain, there is a suggestion that the flow may have been constrained by glacial ice.

== Gallery ==
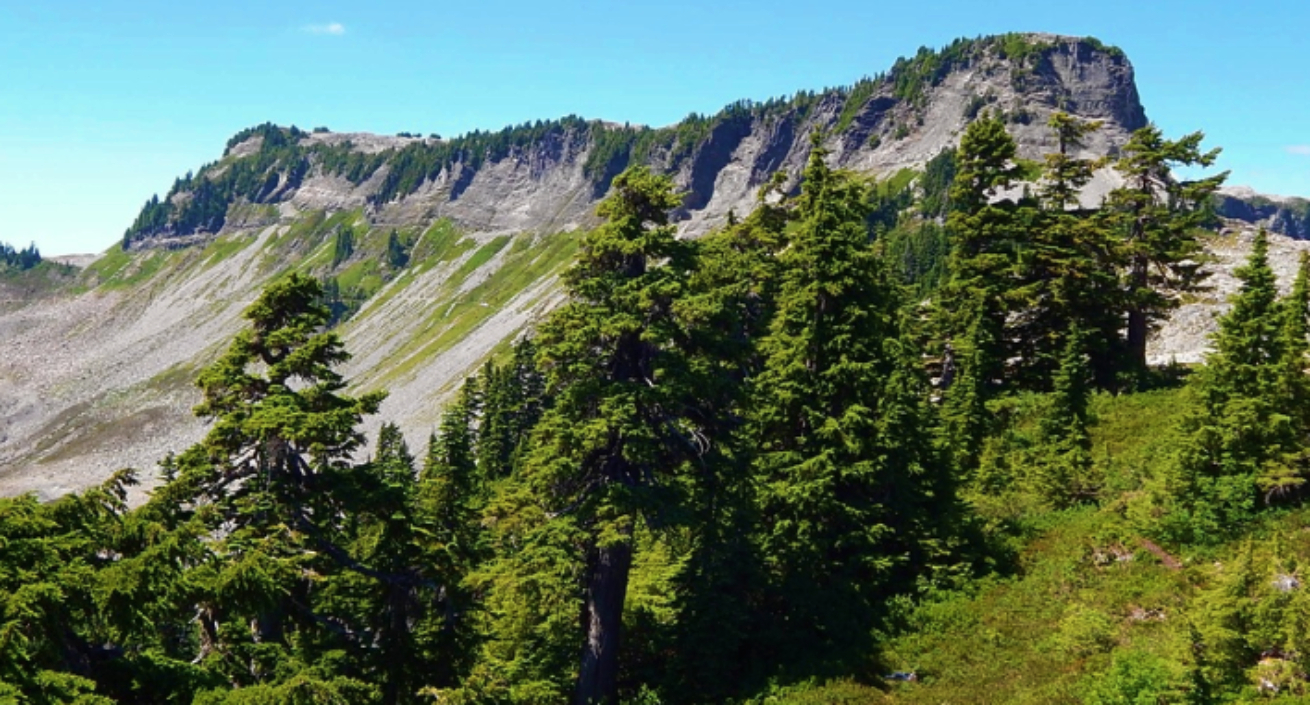
Table Mountain from Artist Point

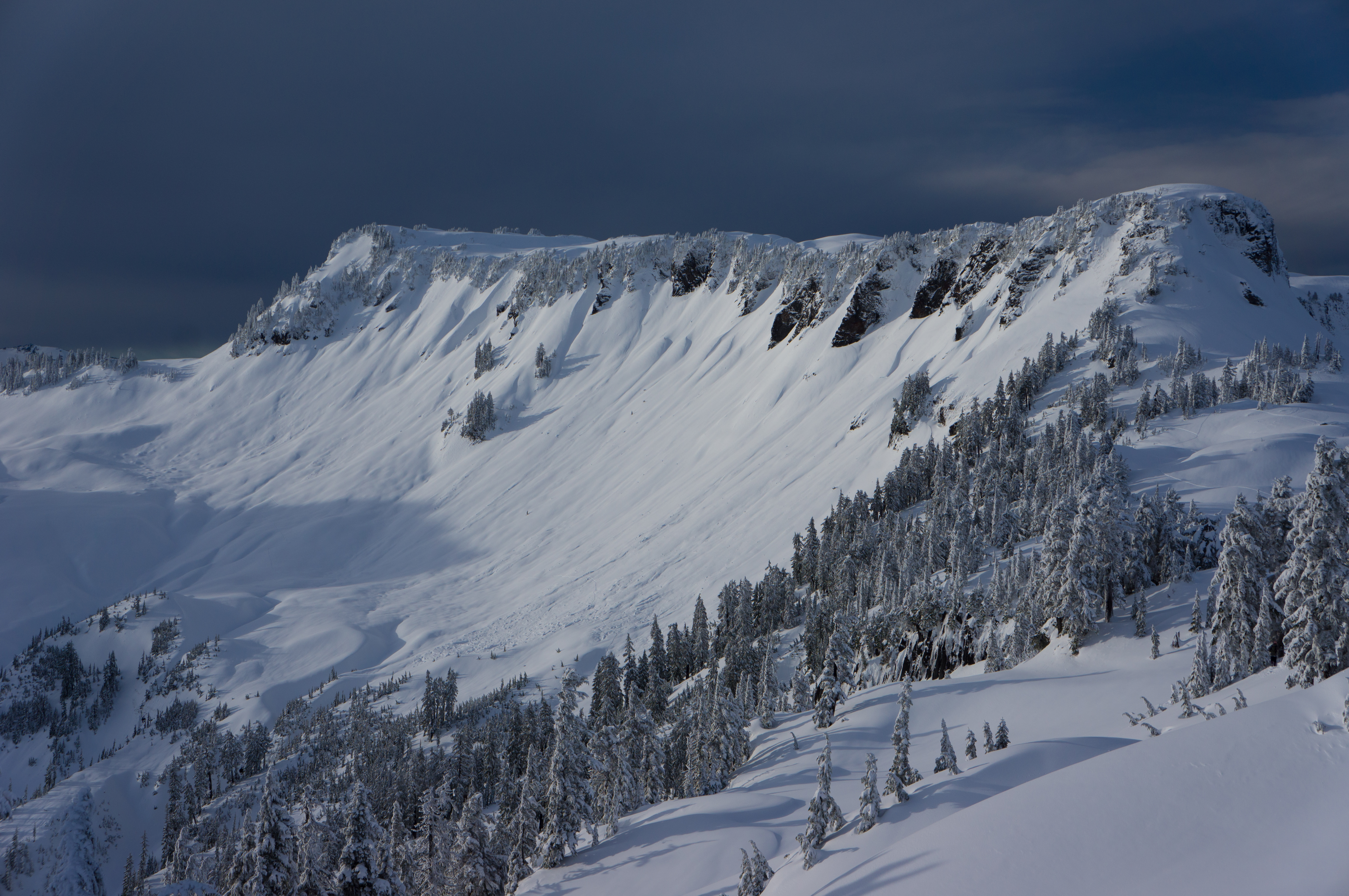
Table Mountain in winter

== See also ==
- Geology of the Pacific Northwest
- Kulshan Caldera
- Geography of the North Cascades
