= Monitor Range =

Mountain range in Nevada, United States

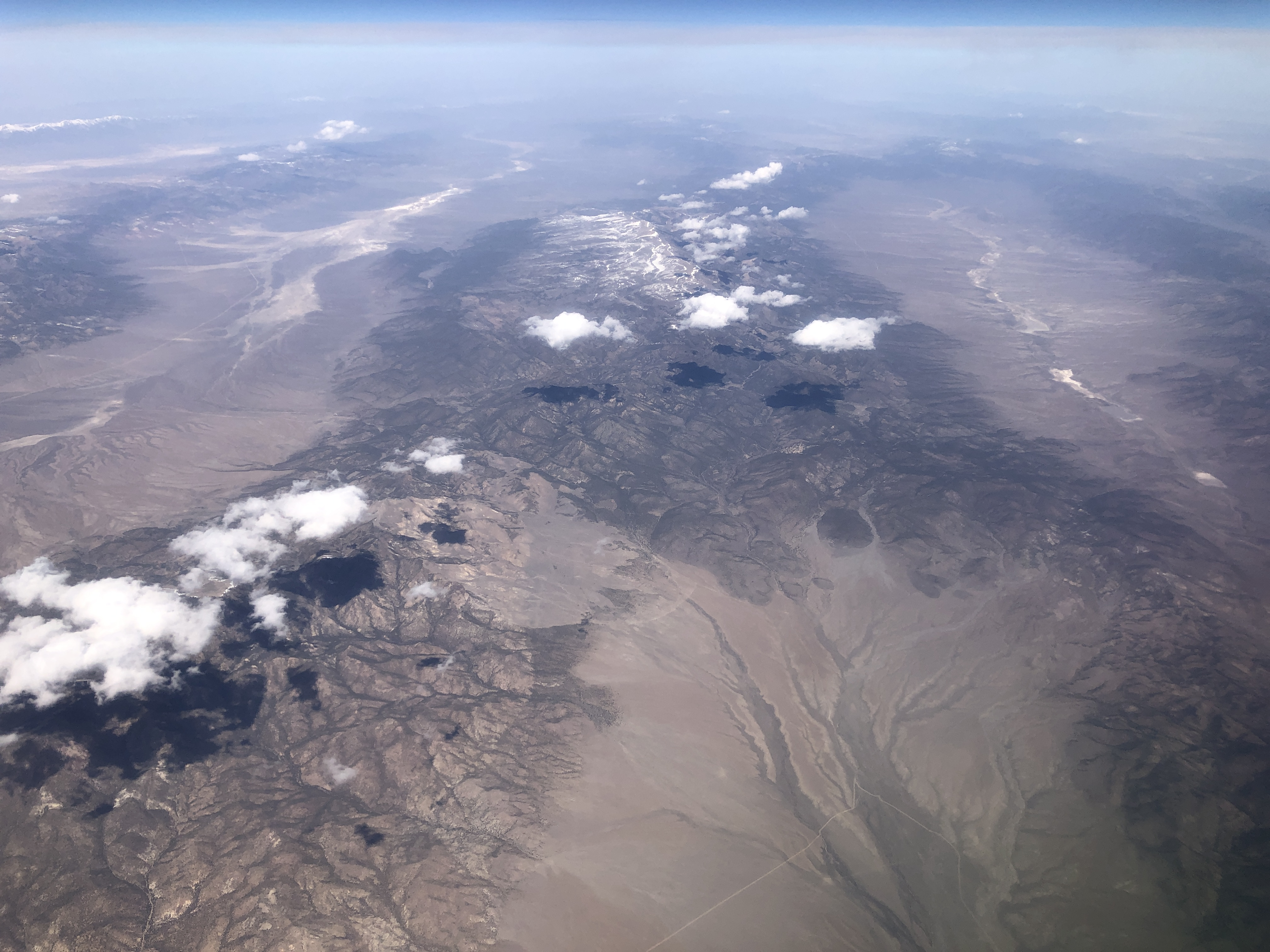
- View of the Monitor Range from above, looking north

Highest point
- Peak: Table Mountain
- Elevation: 10,649 ft (3,246 m)

Dimensions
- Area: 1,176 mi^{2} (3,050 km^{2})

Geography
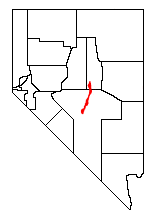
- Location of the Monitor Range within Nevada
- Country: United States
- State: Nevada
- Range coordinates: 38°50′N 116°35′W

The Monitor Range is located in south-central Nevada in the United States. The range lies west and northwest of the Hot Creek Range and north of U.S. Route 6 in Nye County. It extends into the southwest corner of Eureka County at its northern end ending just south of U.S. Route 50. Tonopah is about 15 miles west of the south end of the range and Eureka lies about 20 miles (32 km) east of the north end of the range. Its highest point is Table Mountain at 10,649 feet (3,246 m).

The Table Mountain Wilderness Area lies in the central part of the Monitor Range. The mountains cover an area of 1,176 square miles (3,046 km^{2}), and lies between the Antelope Valley and the Monitor Valley at the northern end. At the southern end, the mountains lie between the Toquima Range and Stone Cabin Valley.

As the map/graphic shows, its extreme linearity is because the range is an extensive linear horst between graben (down-dropped) valleys to the east and west. The range lies amongst a series of range-valley-ranges, in south-central Nevada (mostly south of the Humboldt River). The pattern is the result of crustal extension as part of the basin and range topography of western North America.

The Forest Service is in charge of 83.6% of the mountains and the Bureau of Land Management manages 16% of the range. Pinon-juniper makes up 39.3% of the area, with Sagebrush scrub making up 24.8% of the mountains. Montane shrub accounts for 19.9%.
