= Mountain Boy Range =

Mountain range in Nevada, US

- Location within Nevada

Highest point
- Elevation: 2,185 m (7,169 ft)

Geography
- Country: United States
- State: Nevada
- District: Eureka County
- Range coordinates: 39°29′21.743″N 116°2′27.216″W
- Topo map: USGS Spring Valley Summit

The Mountain Boy Range is a mountain range in Eureka County, Nevada.
