= Table Mountain Wilderness =

Protected wilderness area in Nevada

- IUCN category Ib (wilderness area)
- Location within the United States
- Location: Nye County, Nevada USA
- Nearest city: Tonopah, NV
- Coordinates: 38°46′19″N 116°35′06″W
- Area: 92,600 acres (37,500 ha)
- Established: 1989
- Governing body: U.S. Forest Service

The Table Mountain Wilderness is a protected wilderness area in the Monitor Range of Nye County in the central section of the state of Nevada. It is the third largest wilderness area in the state. The nearest city is Tonopah, Nevada. The Table Mountain Wilderness Area covers 92,600 acres (37,500 ha), and is administered by the Humboldt-Toiyabe National Forest. The 1860s ghost town of Belmont is nearby.

The Table Mountain Wilderness is a partially forested tableland, or high plateau, which lies at the center of the Monitor Range. Table Mountain itself rises to 10,000 feet (3,000 m) and covers an area of 12 square miles (31 km^{2}). There are significant herds of mule deer and elk as well as mountain lions, bobcats, coyotes, beaver, chukar partridge, sage grouse, blue grouse, golden eagles, hawks, and falcons. The deer and elk herds are among the largest in the state. Five fishing streams hold rainbow, brook, brown, and Lahontan cutthroat trout. Aspen trees are very common. Pines, juniper, mountain mahogany, and cottonwood are also found. Horse packing and riding, hiking and backpacking are popular activities. The most popular trail is the Barley Creek Trail which is 6 miles (10 km) long, not counting forks. Other trailheads are at Mosquito Creek, Clear Creek, and Green Monster Canyon. A 20-mile (32 km) loop trail follows Cottonwood Creek, which has beaver ponds. There are over 100 miles (160 km) of trails.

Wilderness areas do not allow motorized or mechanical equipment including bicycles. Although camping and fishing are allowed with proper permits, no roads or buildings are constructed and there is also no logging or mining, in compliance with the 1964 Wilderness Act. Wilderness areas within National Forests and Bureau of Land Management areas also allow hunting in season. The elk herd, which had disappeared from this region, was reintroduced in 1979 and is doing well. In 1999 the second largest bull elk ever taken in the 20th century in North America was taken in this wilderness.

== See also ==
- List of largest wilderness areas in the United States
- List of wilderness areas in Nevada
- List of U.S. Wilderness Areas
- Nevada Wilderness Areas
- Wilderness Act
