= Mount Schurz =

Mountain in Wyoming, United States

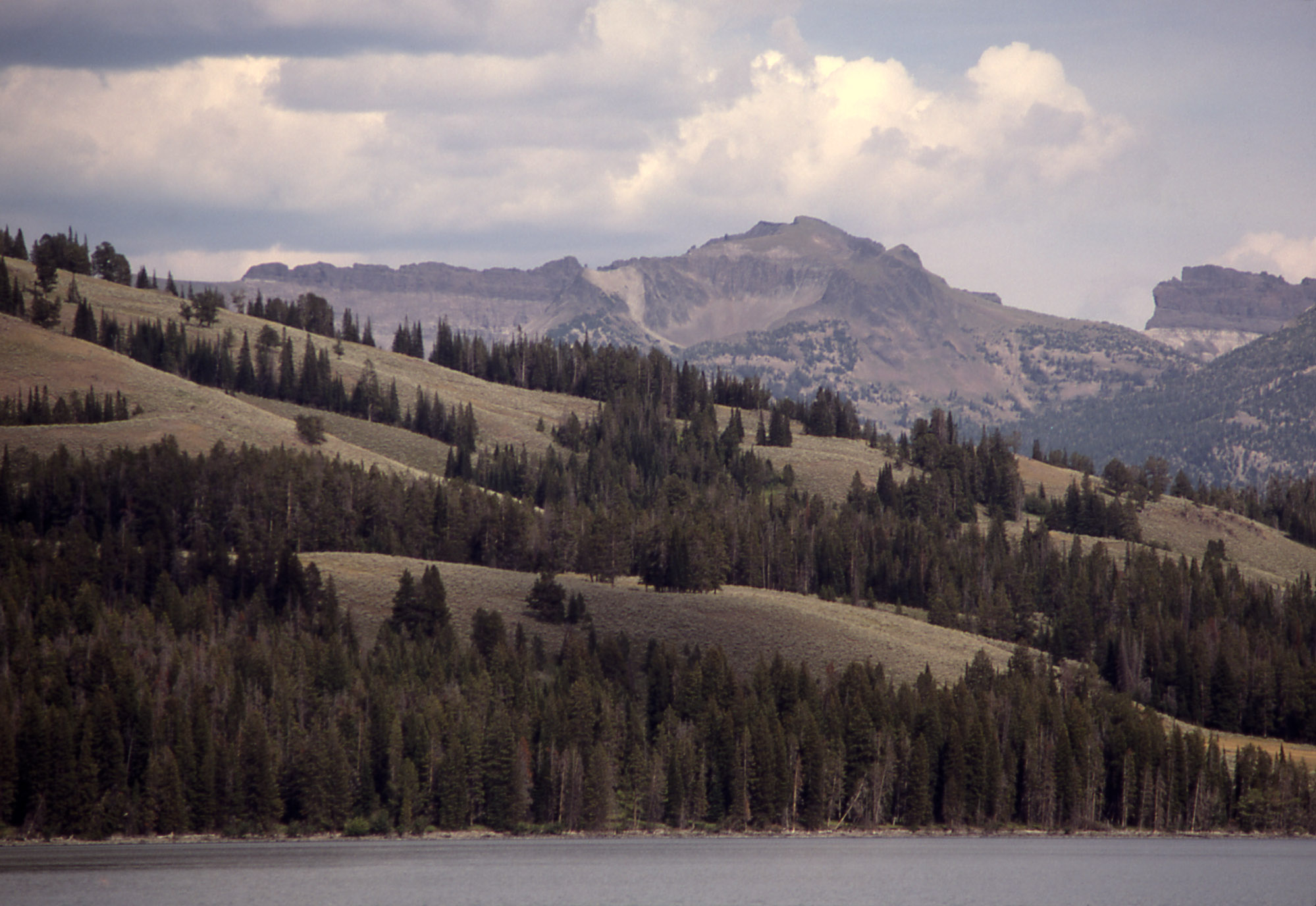
- 1977

Highest point
- Elevation: 11,007 ft (3,355 m)
- Coordinates: 44°20′33″N 110°04′19″W

Naming
- Pronunciation: /ˈʃɜːrts/

Geography
- Location within Wyoming
- Location: Yellowstone National Park, Park County, Wyoming, US
- Parent range: Absaroka Range
- Topo map: Eagle Peak

Mount Schurz el. 11,007 feet (3,355 m) is a mountain peak in the Absaroka Range in Yellowstone National Park. Mount Schurz is the second highest peak in Yellowstone. The mountain was originally named Mount Doane by Henry D. Washburn during the Washburn–Langford–Doane Expedition in 1871. Later the name Mount Doane was given to another peak in the Absaroka Range by geologist Arnold Hague. In 1885, Hague named the mountain for the 13th U.S. Secretary of the Interior, Carl Schurz (1877–1881). Schurz was the first Secretary of the Interior to visit Yellowstone and a strong supporter of the national park movement.

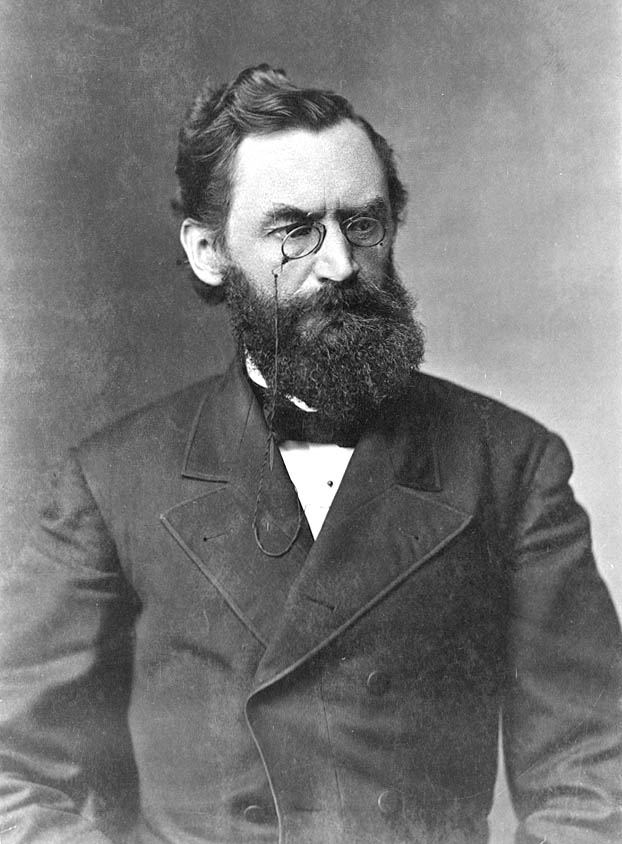
Carl Schurz, namesake of Mount Schurz

== See also ==
- Mountains and mountain ranges of Yellowstone National Park

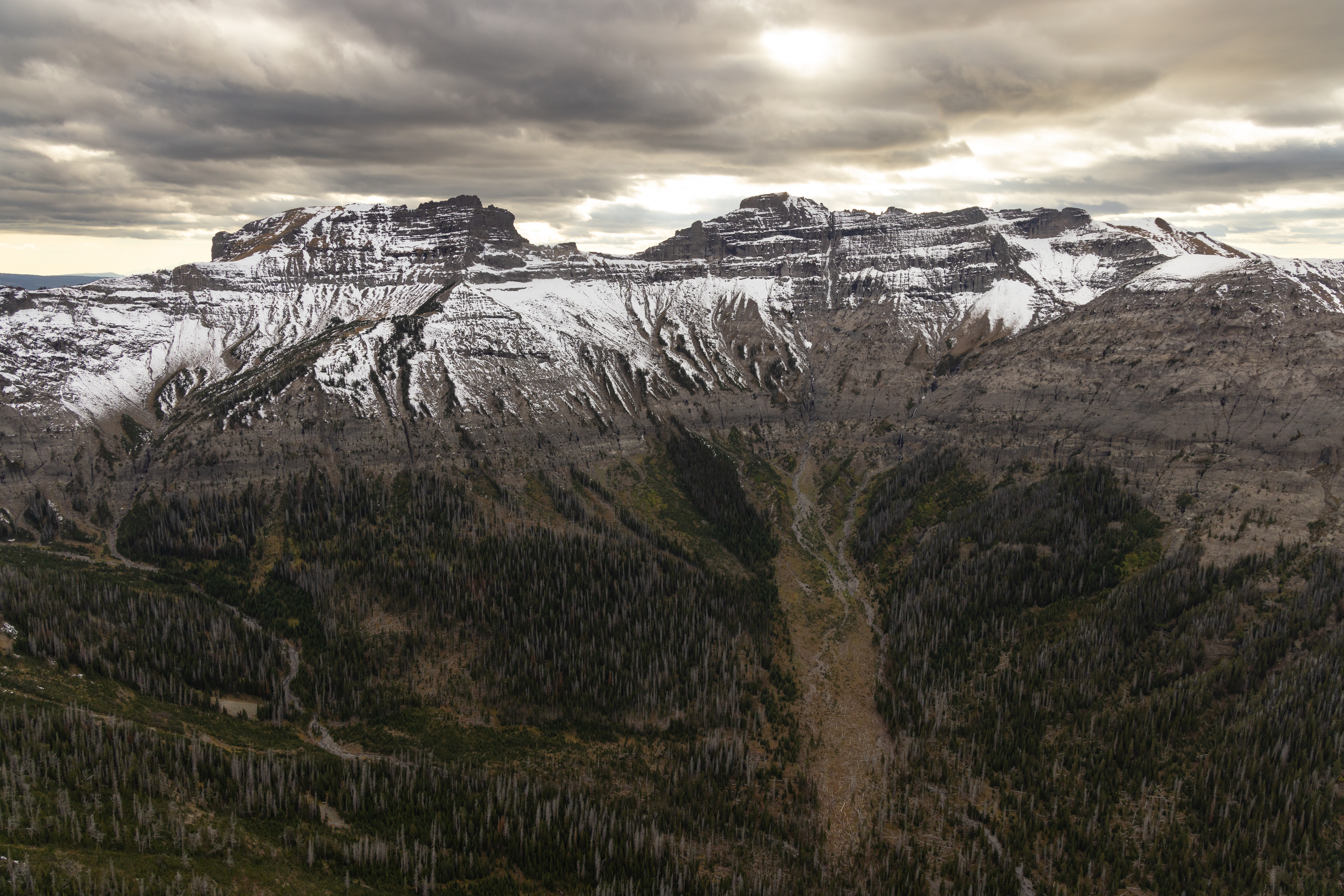
Mount Humphreys (left) and Mt. Schurz (right) viewed from the northeast
