= Washakie Wilderness =

Wilderness area in Wyoming, United States

- IUCN category Ib (wilderness area)
- Location within the United States
- Location: Park / Fremont / Hot Springs counties, Wyoming, United States
- Nearest city: Cody, WY
- Coordinates: 44°25′N 109°56′W
- Area: 704,274 acres (2,850.10 km^{2})
- Established: 1964
- Governing body: U.S. Forest Service

The Washakie Wilderness is located in Shoshone National Forest in the U.S. state of Wyoming.

U.S. Wilderness Areas do not allow motorized or mechanized vehicles, including bicycles. Although camping and fishing are allowed with proper permit, no roads or buildings are constructed and there is also no logging or mining, in compliance with the 1964 Wilderness Act. Wilderness areas within National Forests and Bureau of Land Management areas also allow hunting in season.

== Climate ==
Climate data for Mount Burwell 43.9511 N, 109.4750 W, Elevation: 12,280 ft (3,740 m) (1991–2020 normals)
Month	Jan	Feb	Mar	Apr	May	Jun	Jul	Aug	Sep	Oct	Nov	Dec	Year
Mean daily maximum °F (°C)	18.6 (−7.4)	18.0 (−7.8)	23.0 (−5.0)	28.1 (−2.2)	37.5 (3.1)	48.1 (8.9)	58.2 (14.6)	57.2 (14.0)	48.2 (9.0)	35.5 (1.9)	24.0 (−4.4)	18.0 (−7.8)	34.5 (1.4)
Daily mean °F (°C)	9.3 (−12.6)	7.9 (−13.4)	12.2 (−11.0)	16.8 (−8.4)	25.8 (−3.4)	35.4 (1.9)	44.3 (6.8)	43.5 (6.4)	35.4 (1.9)	24.3 (−4.3)	14.7 (−9.6)	8.9 (−12.8)	23.2 (−4.9)
Mean daily minimum °F (°C)	0.0 (−17.8)	−2.2 (−19.0)	1.5 (−16.9)	5.6 (−14.7)	14.0 (−10.0)	22.7 (−5.2)	30.5 (−0.8)	29.8 (−1.2)	22.6 (−5.2)	13.1 (−10.5)	5.5 (−14.7)	−0.1 (−17.8)	11.9 (−11.1)
Average precipitation inches (mm)	2.86 (73)	2.75 (70)	2.70 (69)	3.83 (97)	4.32 (110)	2.88 (73)	1.97 (50)	1.62 (41)	2.65 (67)	2.76 (70)	2.87 (73)	3.16 (80)	34.37 (873)
Source: PRISM Climate Group

== See also ==
- List of U.S. Wilderness Areas
