= Nevada Wilderness Areas =

Protected wilderness in Nevada

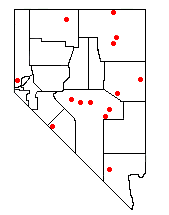
Location of Wilderness Areas within Nevada

In 1989 the U.S. Government enacted the Nevada Wilderness Bill, expanding the one existing Wilderness Area (Jarbidge) and creating thirteen new areas. The estimated total of 733,400 acres (296,800 ha) was over eleven times the area that had previously been under wilderness protection.

The following Wilderness Areas were expanded or designated in the Humboldt National Forest:

- The Jarbidge Wilderness Area, previously 64,667 acres (26,170 ha), was expanded to 113,167 acres (45,797 ha). This area protects wilderness in the higher elevations of the Jarbidge Mountains in far northern Elko County.
- The Currant Mountain Wilderness Area was created, protecting approximately 36,000 acres (15,000 ha) in the upper elevations of the White Pine Range in eastern White Pine County.
- The East Humboldt Wilderness Area was created, protecting approximately 36,900 acres (14,900 ha) in the upper elevations of the East Humboldt Range in central Elko County.
- The Quinn Canyon Wilderness Area was created, protecting approximately 27,000 acres (11,000 ha) in the upper elevations of the Quinn Canyon Range in northeastern Nye County.
- The Ruby Mountains Wilderness Area was created, protecting approximately 90,000 acres (36,000 ha) in the upper elevations of the Ruby Mountains in southern Elko County.
- The Grant Range Wilderness Area was created, protecting approximately 50,000 acres (20,000 ha) in the upper elevations of the Grant Range in northeastern Nye County.
- The Mount Moriah Wilderness Area was created, protecting approximately 82,000 acres (33,000 ha) in the upper elevations of the north section of the Snake Range in eastern White Pine County.
- The Santa Rosa-Paradise Peak Wilderness Area was created, protecting approximately 31,000 acres (13,000 ha) in the upper elevations of the southern section of the Santa Rosa Range in northern Humboldt County.

The following Wilderness Areas were designated in the Toiyabe National Forest:

- The Alta Toquima Wilderness Area was created, protecting approximately 38,000 acres (15,000 ha) in the upper elevations of the Toquima Range in northwestern Nye County.
- The Arc Dome Wilderness Area was created, protecting approximately 115,000 acres (47,000 ha) in the upper elevations of the Toiyabe Range in northwestern Nye County.
- The Mount Rose Wilderness Area was created, protecting approximately 28,000 acres (11,000 ha) in the upper elevations of the Carson Range in southern Washoe County.
- The Mount Charleston Wilderness Area was created, protecting approximately 43,000 acres (17,000 ha) in the upper elevations of the Spring Mountains in western Clark County.
- The Table Mountain Wilderness Area was created, protecting approximately 98,000 acres (40,000 ha) of the Monitor Range in north-central Nye County.

Finally, the Boundary Peak Wilderness was created in the Inyo National Forest, protecting approximately 10,000 acres (4,000 ha) in the northern section of the White Mountains in western Esmeralda County. Additional areas are under consideration for designation as Wilderness Areas - for more information link to the Nevada Wilderness site listed below.

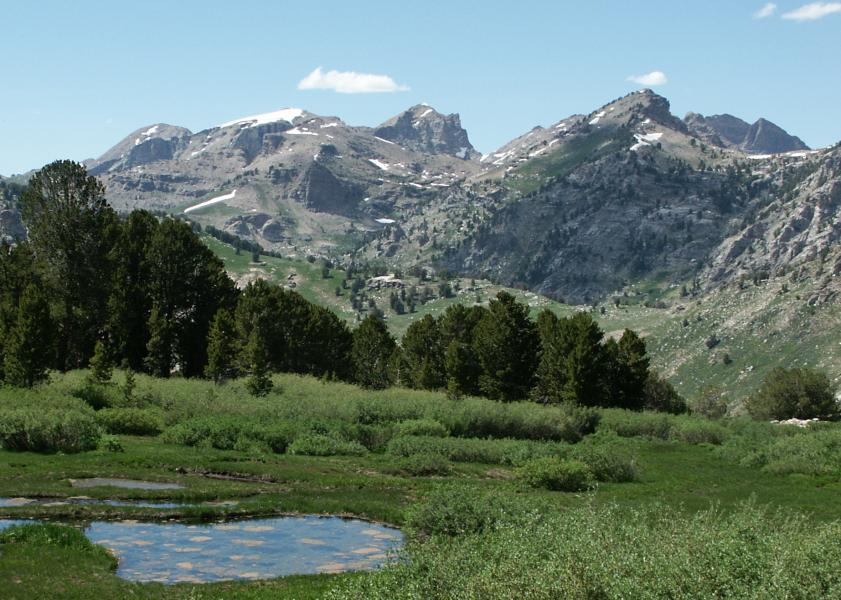
Ruby Mountains Wilderness, Nevada

There are 16 official wilderness areas in Lincoln County that are part of the National Wilderness Preservation System. All are managed by the Bureau of Land Management. Several extend into neighboring counties (as indicated below).

- Big Rocks Wilderness
- Clover Mountains Wilderness
- Delamar Mountains Wilderness
- Far South Egans Wilderness (partly in Nye County, NV)
- Fortification Range Wilderness
- Meadow Valley Range Wilderness (partly in Clark County, NV)
- Mormon Mountains Wilderness (partly in Clark County, NV)
- Mount Grafton Wilderness (mostly in White Pine County, NV)
- Mount Irish Wilderness
- Parsnip Peak Wilderness
- South Egan Range Wilderness (partly in White Pine County, NV; Nye County, NV)
- South Pahroc Range Wilderness
- Tunnel Spring Wilderness
- Weepah Spring Wilderness (partly in Nye County, NV)
- White Rock Range Wilderness
- Worthington Mountains Wilderness

White Pine County is home to a number of designated wilderness areas. They were created on December 20, 2006, by the "White Pine County Conservation, Recreation, and Development Act of 2006." About half are integral parts of Humboldt National Forest. The rest are managed by the Bureau of Land Management. One is shared between the two agencies. Some extend into neighboring counties, as indicated.

- Bald Mountain Wilderness (Humboldt NF)
- Becky Peak Wilderness (BLM)
- Bristlecone Wilderness (BLM)
- Goshute Canyon Wilderness (BLM)
- Government Peak Wilderness (BLM)
- High Schells Wilderness (Humboldt NF)
- Highland Ridge Wilderness (BLM)
- Mount Grafton Wilderness (BLM) partly in Lincoln County, NV
- Mount Moriah Wilderness (Humboldt NF / BLM)
- Red Mountain Wilderness (Humboldt NF) partly in Nye County, NV
- Shellback Wilderness (Humboldt NF)
- South Egan Range Wilderness (BLM) partly in Lincoln County, NV; Nye County, NV
- White Pine Range Wilderness (Humboldt NF)
