= List of former state routes in Nevada =

Former state routes in Nevada
- State: State Route X (SR X)

System links
- Nevada State Highway System; Interstate; US; State; Pre‑1976; Scenic

The following is a list of state routes in Nevada longer than one mile (1.6 km) in length that have been removed from the Nevada state highway system since 1976. Several of these highways were reorganized into the state system of frontage roads.

== List of highways ==
Number	Length (mi)	Length (km)	Southern or western terminus	Northern or eastern terminus	Local names	Formed	Removed	Notes
SR 121	27.047	43.528	US 50 southeast of Fallon	Settlement Road in Dixie Valley		1976	c. 2022	Now designated as a frontage road (FR CH08)
SR 142	—	—	—	—	Las Vegas Boulevard	1976	c. 1981	Now SR 604
SR 144	3.132	5.040	I-15 in Mesquite (at exit 120)	I-15 in Mesquite (at exit 122)		1976	c. 2005	
SR 153	10.7	17.2	SR 160 in Enterprise	U.S. 95 in Las Vegas	Rainbow Boulevard	1976	c. 1983	Now SR 595
SR 162	—	—	—	—	Needles Highway	1976	c. 1982	Originally followed a now-impassable route
SR 166	11.9	19.2	US 93 (now US 93 Bus.) northeast of Boulder City	SR 147 / SR 564 east of Henderson	Lakeshore Road	1976	c. 2000	
SR 167	44.0	70.8	SR 147 east of Las Vegas	SR 169 south of Overton	Northshore Road	1976	c. 2000	
SR 291	110.113	177.210	Oregon state line on OR 140 towards Adel, Ore.	US 95 south of Orovada		1976	c. 1980	former SR 140, changed back to SR 140
SR 378	2.7	4.3	SR 376 west of Round Mountain	Main Street in Round Mountain		1976	c. 1999	
SR 428	11	18	US 395 north of Carson City	US 395 north of Washoe City		1976	c. 1983	
SR 429	7.824	12.592	Hobart Road north of Carson City	US 395 in Washoe City		1976	2012	
SR 442	—	—	—	—		1976	c. 1981	Sullivan Avenue
SR 485	2	3.2	Ruth	US 50 west of Ely		1976	c. 1983	
SR 486	33	53	US 6 / US 50 / US 93 southeast of Ely	US 93 north of Ely		1976	c. 1983	
SR 489	8.2	13.2	Cherry Creek	US 93 north of Ely		1976	c. 1978	
SR 500	2.25	3.62	US 93 in Boulder City	US 93 northeast of Boulder City	Nevada Highway	1976	c. 1982	
SR 501	—	—	—	—	Nevada Highway	1976	c. 1982	
SR 512	2.282	3.673	Kings Creek in Carson City	S. Carson Street in Carson City		c. 1983	c. 2009	
SR 513	2.185	3.516	S. Carson Street in Carson City	Fairview Drive in Carson City		1976	2011	
SR 516	2.452	3.946	W. King Street in Carson City	N. Carson Street in Carson City		1983	c. 2009	
SR 518	1.014	1.632	US 50 / US 395 in Carson City	Jacobsen Way in Carson City		1976	2018	
SR 520	1.227	1.975	S. Carson Street in Carson City	E. William Street in Carson City		1976	2010	
SR 525	1.323	2.129	Lompa Lane in Carson City	US 50 in Carson City		1976	2011	
SR 530	1.464	2.356	Carson Street in Carson City	Lompa Lane in Carson City		1994	2010	
SR 531	1.645	2.647	N. Carson Street in Carson City	Lompa Lane in Carson City		1995	2011	
SR 587	—	—	I-515 in Las Vegas	Redondo Avenue in Las Vegas		c. 1999	c. 2001	Became part of SR 159
SR 591	—	—	Aldebaran Avenue	Mel Tormé Way	Spring Mountain Road	1976	—	Now maintained as unsigned Frontage Road 51
SR 594	—	—	Polaris Avenue	Las Vegas Boulevard	Russell Road	1976	—	
SR 601	3.2	5.1	Las Vegas Blvd S. / Saint Louis Avenue in Las Vegas	Las Vegas Blvd N. / 5th Street in North Las Vegas	Main Street	1976	c. 2005	Comprised all of Main Street.
SR 605	2.977	4.791	Tropicana Avenue in Las Vegas	Sahara Avenue in Las Vegas	Paradise Road	1976	c. 2001	Comprised parts of Paradise Road.
SR 606	2.07	3.33	Flamingo Road in Las Vegas	Sahara Avenue in Las Vegas	Maryland Parkway	1999	2001	Comprised parts of Maryland Parkway.
SR 607	5.237	8.428	Sahara Avenue in Las Vegas	Cheyenne Avenue in North Las Vegas	Eastern Avenue; Civic Center Drive	1976	c. 2006	Comprised parts of Eastern Avenue and Civic Center Drive.
SR 650	6.365	10.243	Equity Avenue in Reno	US 395 in northern Reno		1976	2009	Absorbed into SR 659 in 2009
SR 651	6.630	10.670	West 4th Street in Reno	US 395 in northern Reno		1976	2009	Absorbed into SR 659 in 2009
SR 663	2.491	4.009	Sutro Street in Reno	SR 445 in Sparks		1976	2010	
SR 666	—	—	—	—		c. 1982	1983	Former SR 443, changed back to SR 443
SR 706	—	—	—	—		—	—	absorbed into SR 513
SR 758	—	—	SR 206 near Genoa	US 395 north of Minden		1976	1995	Absorbed into SR 206 by 1995
SR 765	—	—	—	—		1976	1995	
SR 780	2.270	3.653	Richmond–Eureka Mine	US 50 in Eureka		1976	2012	
SR 786	—	—	I-80 Business in Winnemucca	SR 294 in Winnemucca		1976	c. 2002	Absorbed by SR 294 on May 1, 1997
SR 790	—	—	SR 789 in Golconda	Stanford Street in Golconda		1976	1997	Now Morrison Avenue
Former

== State Route 121 ==
State Route 121
- Location: Churchill County
- Length: 27.047 mi (43.528 km)
- Existed: 1976–c. 2022

== State Route 142 ==
State Route 142
- Location: Las Vegas
- Existed: 1976–c. 1981

== State Route 144 ==
State Route 144
- Location: Mesquite
- Existed: 1976–2005

State Route 144 (SR 144) in Mesquite was also designated as Interstate 15 Business. It was removed as of December 31, 2005. It covered Mesquite Boulevard and Sandhill Boulevard in Mesquite. The State Route designation was applied to the portion of Mesquite Boulevard from its southern crossing of Interstate 15 to Sandhill Boulevard, then along Sandhill Boulevard to its northern crossing of Interstate 15. The route was 3.132 miles (5.040 km) long.

Route 144, from SR 170 to Hillside Drive, was once US 91, which used to stretch from Sweetgrass, Montana to Long Beach, California.

== State Route 153 ==
State Route 153
- Location: Las Vegas
- Existed: 1976–c. 1983

== State Route 162 ==
State Route 162
- Location: Near Laughlin
- History: Established on July 1, 1976, as part of the renumbering of state highways; decommissioned between 1999 and 2010

State Route 162 existed between 1976 and sometime between 1999 and 2010. The most recent alignment of the route began at the California state line as the Needles Highway. From there, it continued northward until terminating at SR 163. Though the original alignment of the route is now inaccessible, the most recent alignment's roadway is still visible.

== State Route 166 ==
State Route 166
- Location: Boulder City to Henderson
- Existed: 1976–c. 2000

State Route 166 was a Nevada state highway that was signed along Lakeshore Road in Clark County. The road still runs along the west shore of Lake Mead, but is no longer a state highway. SR 166 started at an intersection with US 93 near Boulder City inside the Lake Mead National Recreation Area. The highway went north along Lake Mead's shore. It quickly encountered a toll booth where motorists paid to enter the recreation area. Several roads branched off SR 166 and lead to marinas. Near the end of its route, the highway turned west before meeting its northern terminus, at an intersection with SR 564/SR 147.

Signage for the route was removed by 2000, and according to a park ranger, the route is a park service road, and the signs were only put up to "make it easier for tourists".

== State Route 167 ==
State Route 167
- Location: Lake Mead National Recreation Area to Overton
- Existed: 1976–c. 2000

State Route 167 was a Nevada state highway that was signed along Northshore Road in Clark County. The road still runs along the west shore of Lake Mead, but it is no longer a state highway. SR 167 started at SR 147 inside the Lake Mead National Recreation Area. The road went east along Lake Mead's shore. It eventually turned north near Echo Bay. A road branched SR 167 and led to Echo Bay Airport, and another road led to Overton Beach on Lake Mead. The road turned west and quickly reached its northeastern terminus at SR 169.

== State Route 291 ==
State Route 291
- Location: Humboldt County
- Existed: 1976–1980

State Route 291 (SR 291) was a two-lane state highway in Humboldt County. It served a sparsely populated section of the state, connecting northwestern Nevada to southern Oregon. Most of the highway was originally part of SR 8A, and was later improved through an effort to provide an all-weather highway linking northern Nevada to the Pacific Northwest.

When Nevada officials began the process of renumbering the state's highways in 1976, SR 140 was planned to be redesignated as State Route 291. The proposed route number was first seen on the 1978 version of the state's highway map. Once the renumbering process was finished in the early 1980s, however, the highway retained the SR 140 designation it has today. The route has remained relatively unchanged since.

== State Route 378 ==
State Route 378
- Location: Round Mountain
- Length: 2.7 mi (4.3 km)
- Existed: 1976–ca. 1999

State Route 378 (SR 378) was a 2.7-mile-long (4.3 km) state highway in Nye County. It connected the community of Round Mountain to SR 376. The highway originated as State Route 70 in 1941 and was later renumbered to State Route 92 before becoming SR 378 in 1976. The route was removed from the state highway system by 1999 to make way for an expansion of the adjacent Round Mountain Gold Mine.

State Route 378 began at a junction with SR 376 in the Big Smoky Valley of northwestern Nye County. From here, the road ran in an easterly direction towards Round Mountain. Nearing the town, the route curved southeast following Mariposa Drive for about 0.3 miles (0.48 km) to its terminus at the intersection of Main Street.

An unimproved road resembling the modern highway alignment first appears on state maps in 1941, connecting the community of Round Mountain to SR 8A (now SR 376). This road was designated as SR 70 the following year. By 1946, pavement had been placed along the route.

By 1965, the SR 70 designation was removed from the highway and replaced with SR 92, potentially to align the 70 designation to a road that met with California's State Route 70.

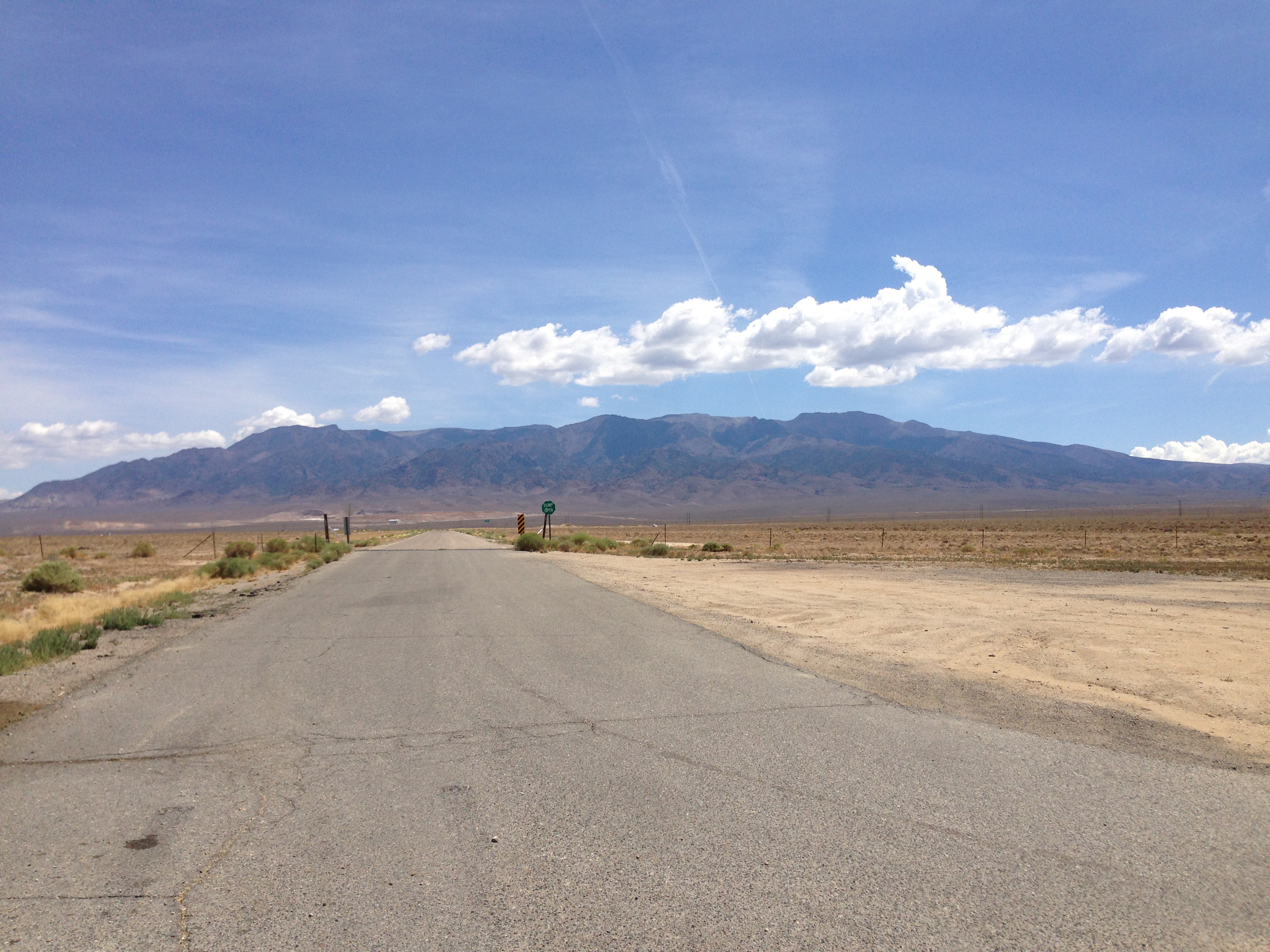
Round Mountain Road as of 2014

In the 1976 renumbering of Nevada's state routes, the recently designated SR 92 was dropped in favor of State Route 378. This numbering change was first seen on state highway maps in 1978. SR 378 remained unchanged on official maps until 1999, when the route number and road itself was removed from the state highway map. A new road to Round Mountain reappeared on the next version of the map, albeit realigned and without a route number. The original highway alignment was enveloped by the expansion of the Round Mountain Gold Mine.

== State Route 428 ==
State Route 428
- Location: Washoe Lake
- Length: 11 mi (18 km)
- Existed: 1976–by 1983

State Route 428 (SR 428) is a former highway in Washoe County. It followed Eastlake Boulevard through New Washoe City and along the east side of Washoe Lake, providing access to Washoe Lake State Park. The road was formerly known as State Route 3B.

State Route 428 began at US 395, near the present-day Eastlake Boulevard interchange just north of Carson City. From there, the highway curved north to follow the eastern shores of Washoe Lake. Near the northeast corner of the lake, the road diverged north to head towards New Washoe City. Outside of the town, SR 428 terminated at another junction on US 395 between Washoe City and Pleasant Valley.

Eastlake Boulevard first appears on state highway maps in 1942 as State Route 3B, an unimproved road branching from State Route 3 (now US 395 Alt) at both ends. The highway had been completely paved by 1969. The route underwent no significant other changes until it was renumbered as State Route 428 in the 1978 statewide highway renumbering.

State Route 428 disappeared from state highway maps by 1983. However, the southern 0.768 miles (1.236 km) of the highway, near the Interstate 580/US 395 interchange, are still maintained by NDOT as a frontage road (FR WA45).

== State Route 429 ==
State Route 429
- Location: Washoe County
- Length: 7.824 mi (12.592 km)
- Existed: 1976–2012

State Route 429 (SR 429) was a rural state highway located in southern Washoe County. It followed Bowers Mansion Road, a former alignment of US 395. The SR 429 designation was retired in 2012, and the route has since become part of US 395 Alt. SR 429 began at Hobart Road, near the Carson City – Washoe County line immediately adjacent to present-day Interstate 580 (I-580) and US 395. From this point, the SR 429 paralleled US 395 northward for about 1.2 miles (1.9 km) and then shifted westward to follow the foothills of the mountains to the west. The highway continued northward past Bowers Mansion State Park before turning east to terminate at US 395 just south of Washoe City.

== State Route 442 ==
State Route 442
- Location: ???
- Existed: 1976–c. 1981

== State Route 485 ==
State Route 485
- Location: Ruth
- Length: 3 mi (4.8 km)
- Existed: 1976–by 1982

State Route 485 (SR 485) was a state highway in White Pine County. It provided access to the town of Ruth. The roadway was turned over to local control in the 1980s.

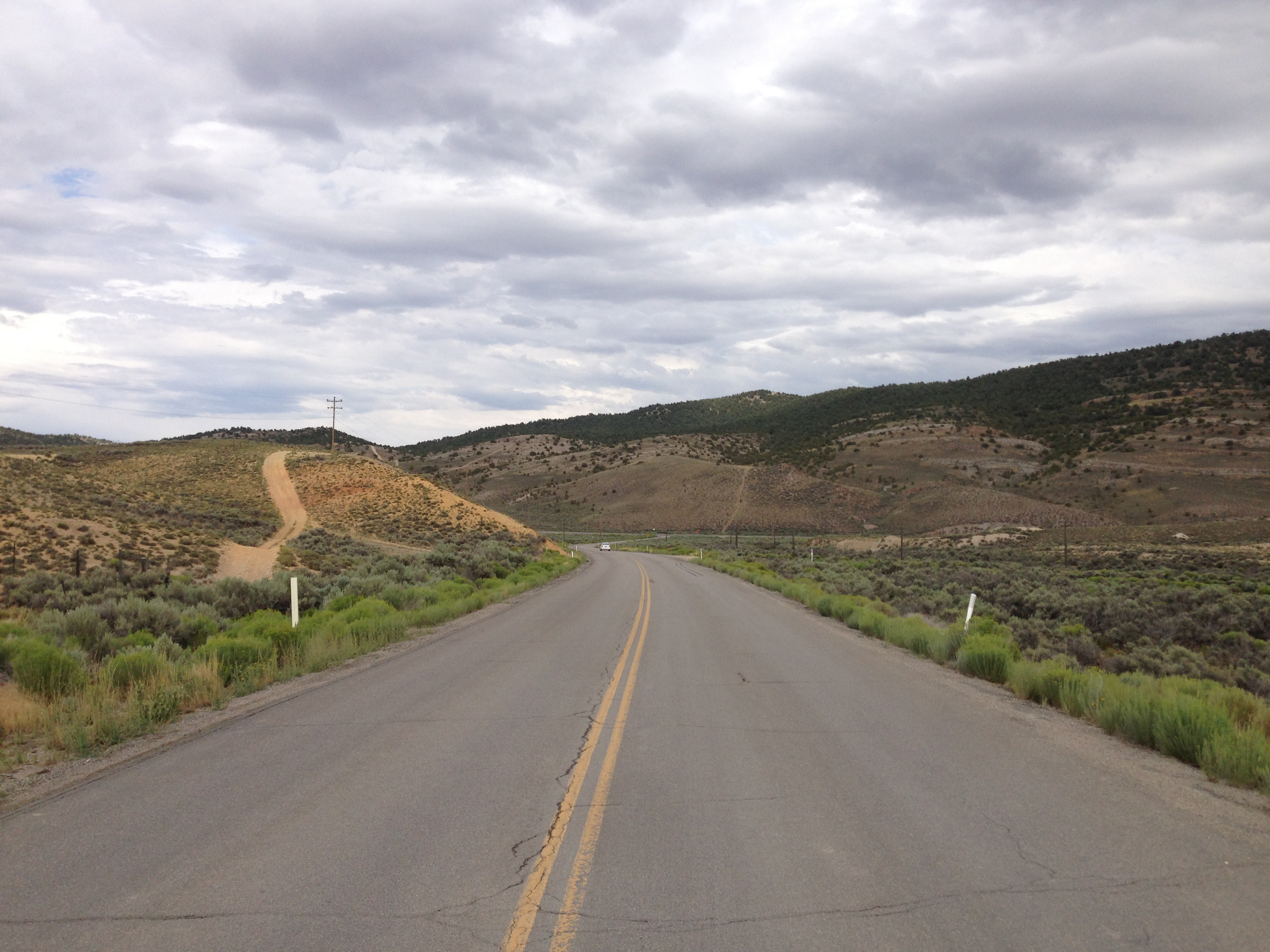
Former SR 485 in 2014

SR 485 started at US 50, about 6 miles (9.7 km) west of Ely. SR 485 ran 2 miles (3.2 km) west to the mining town of Ruth. The road's pavement ends slightly west of Ruth, although a dirt road continues back near the former site of Riepetown.

The road to Ruth was established as State Route 44 by 1935. At that time, the route was shown on official state maps as being a paved road connecting the former town of Kimberly to US 50 via Ruth. By 1941, SR 44 appears to have been altered and then comprised two roadways, a three-mile (4.8 km) road to Ruth and a four-mile (6.4 km) spur to Kimberly;. a routing which was defined by state highway law. Although maps are unclear, it appears the road to Ruth was eliminated prior to 1964, and the spur to Kimberly was retained as SR 44. The town of Ruth may have been relocated along the highway as well, in concordance with open pit mining operations in the area.

SR 44 remained unchanged for many years, until the 1976 renumbering of Nevada's state highways. In that process, SR 44 was to be replaced by SR 485. However, the new designation was not retained through the state's renumbering process; SR 485 last appeared on the 1980–1981 state highway map while the numbering transition was still underway.

== State Route 486 ==
State Route 486
- Location: Duck Creek Valley
- Length: 10.5 mi (16.9 km)
- Existed: yes

State Route 486 (SR 486) was a state highway in White Pine County. The roadway was turned over to local control in the 1990s. Immediately before the route number was retired, the SR 486 designation encompassed Duck Creek Road, which started at the south end of pavement in the middle of Duck Creek Valley. It went north down the valley, then turned west and exited at Gallagher Gap, following the course of Duck Creek. Once through the gap, it continued west until it intersected US 93, where it ended.

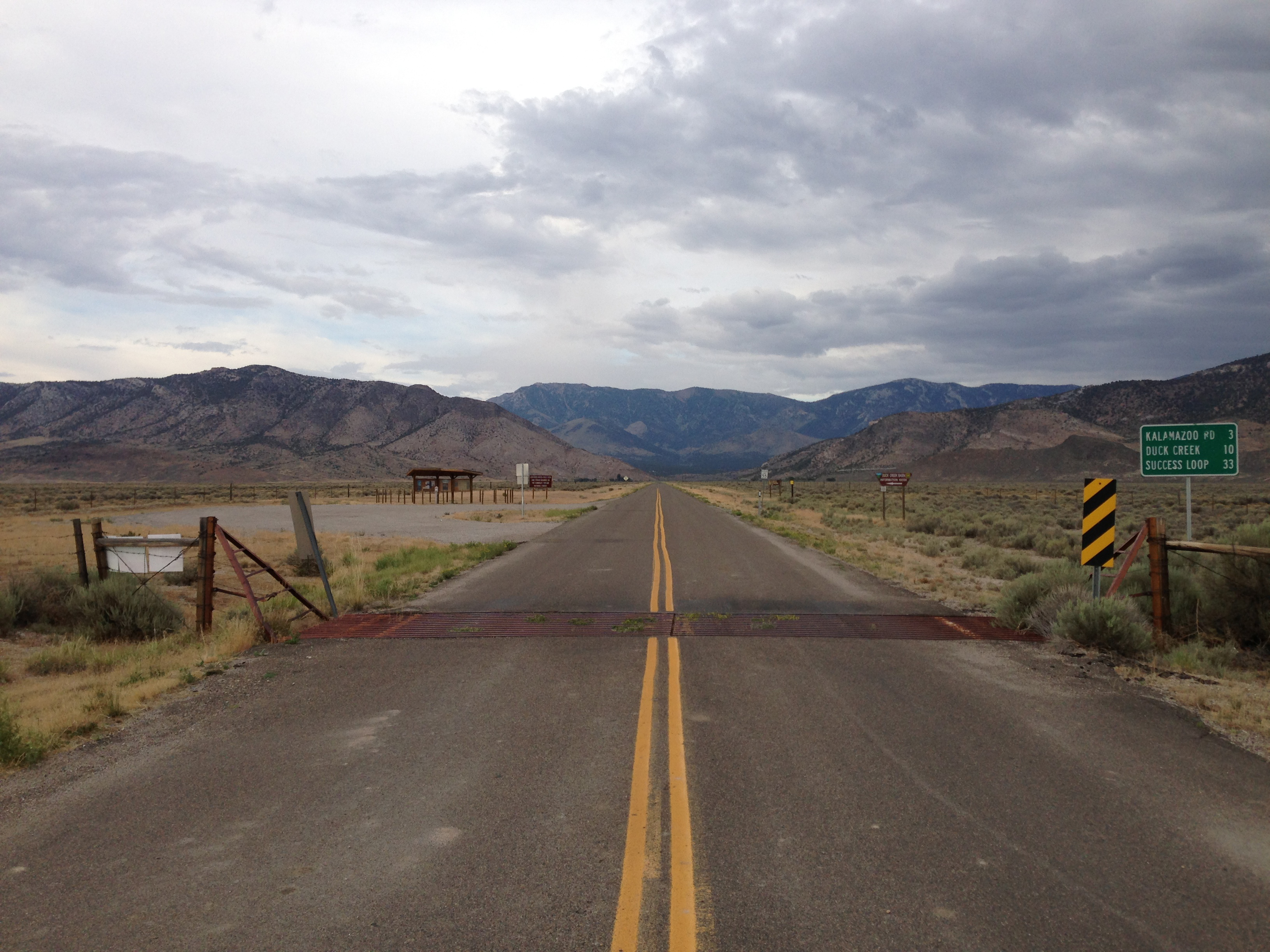
View south from the north end of former SR 486

The road extending east from US 93 to Duck Creek Valley (Duck Creek Road), south over Success Summit to Cave Lake State Park (Success Summit Road), and back west to US 6/US 50/US 93 (Steptoe Creek Road) appeared on state maps before the 1976 renumbering of Nevada's state routes, but had no state designation. The designation of SR 486 was first seen on state highway maps in 1978 and included the entire loop (known as Success Loop), but was scaled back to the paved northern portion by 1982. SR 486 remained unchanged on official maps until 1995, when the route number was removed from the state highway map. The entire loop is now part of White Pine County Route 29, though some agencies, including the Nevada Division of State Parks and Humboldt-Toiyabe National Forest, still refer to part or all of the road as SR 486.

== State Route 489 ==
State Route 489
- Location: Cherry Creek
- Length: 8.2 mi (13.2 km)
- Existed: yes

State Route 489 (SR 489) was a state highway that connected the near ghost town of Cherry Creek to US 93 in White Pine County. The roadway was turned over to local control in the 1990s.The SR 489 designation started at US 93. It went west across Steptoe Valley and ended at the end of pavement in Cherry Creek, which is now almost deserted but was once a thriving town because of silver and gold located in the area. Cherry Creek Road continues west, however the section west of Cherry Creek has never had a state route number.

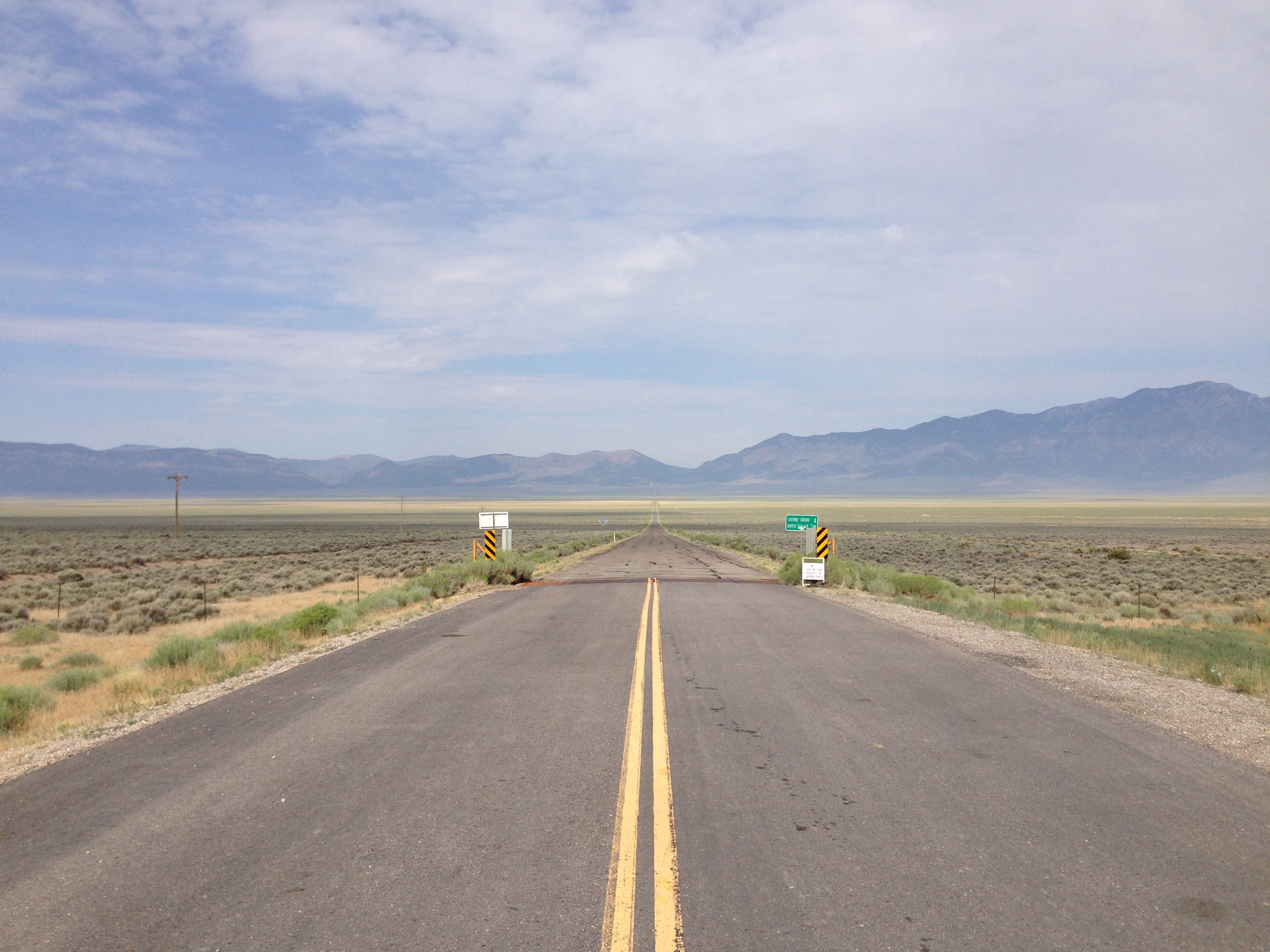
View west along former SR 489 from US 93

Before the 1976 renumbering of Nevada's state routes, the road from US 93 to Cherry Creek was designated SR 35. The change to SR 489 was first seen on state highway maps in 1978. SR 489 remained unchanged on official maps until 1993, when the route number was removed from the state highway map. Both the paved and unpaved sections of Cherry Creek Road are now part of White Pine County Route 21.

== State Route 500 ==
State Route 500
- Location: Boulder City
- Existed: yes

State Route 500 (SR 500) was a state highway located in Boulder City. It ran for about 2.25 miles (3.62 km) along the original route of US 93 and historical US 466 on the Nevada Highway (former State Route 26) through the middle of town. It came into being when the US 93 designation was moved to a new "truck bypass" alignment along the upper reaches of Hemenway Wash in 1982. After being turned over to local control by NDOT, the street was renamed as Nevada Way by the city.

== State Route 501 ==
State Route 501
- Location: Boulder City
- Existed: yes

State Route 501 was a state highway in Boulder City. It ran from US 93 to State Route 500 near City Hall in Boulder City via Adams Boulevard and Utah Street. The route was turned over to local control in the 2000s.

== State Route 512 ==
State Route 512
- Location: Carson City
- Length: 2.146 mi (3.454 km)
- Existed: by 1983–c. 2009

State Route 512 (SR 512) was a state highway in Carson City, Nevada. It connected Kings Canyon west of Carson City to the state capitol using various city streets. The route dates to the mid-19th century, as part of a wagon trail linking Lake Tahoe and Carson City that was later incorporated into the Lincoln Highway. SR 512 was turned over to local control in 2010.

== State Route 513 ==
State Route 513
- Location: Carson City
- Length: 2.185 mi (3.516 km)
- Existed: 1976–2011
- History: SR 65 by 1973

State Route 513 (SR 513) was a short state highway in Carson City, Nevada. The route was originally part of State Route 65, a longer highway that served the eastern outskirts of the city. SR 513 was turned over to Carson City in phases, and completely removed from the state highway system in 2011.

State Route 513 began at the intersection of Fifth Street and South Carson Street (US 395 Business/SR 529) in downtown Carson City. At the northeast corner of this intersection is south end of the Nevada capitol complex. SR 513 headed east along East Fifth Street, passing by the Nevada Legislature building and other state facilities. Crossing Roop Street, the route entered a more residential area of the central city. After about a mile (1.6 km), SR 513 became a two-lane road through more open areas. Fifth Street then rises over the Carson City Freeway (US 50 and 395) and touches down next to Nevada State Prison. In 2011, the state highway ended at a roundabout intersection with Fairview Drive just past the prison facility.

== State Route 516 ==
State Route 516
- Location: Carson City
- Length: 2.452 mi (3.946 km)
- Existed: 1983–circa 2009

State Route 516 (SR 516) was a state highway following Ormsby Boulevard and Winnie Lane in Carson City, Nevada. The route was turned over to local control in 2010.

The highway began at the intersection of Ormsby Boulevard and West King Street (SR 512) in a residential area of western Carson City. From there, the route went north on Ormsby Boulevard through residential areas and fields before curving west. After approximately one mile (1.6 km), the route intersected Winnie Lane. SR 516 followed Winnie Lane north and east from this intersection, passing about 1.4 miles (2.3 km) through more neighborhoods before ending at North Carson Street (US 395 Business/SR 529).

State Route 516 was designated a state highway in 1983. This change was seen on the state highway map in 1982.

A transfer of ownership of several state highways to Carson City's control was proposed by 2007. The shift in ownership, which included SR 516, was proposed in order to reduce the amount of money the city was supposed to pay to the Nevada Department of Transportation for the construction of the Carson City Freeway (future Interstate 580). State Route 516 was removed from the state highway system by January 2010.

== State Route 518 ==
State Route 518
- Location: Carson City
- Length: 1.104 mi (1.777 km)
- Existed: 1976–2018
- History: Established as SR 36 by 1936; Renumbered SR 518 in 1976; Removed from state highway system in 2018

State Route 518 (SR 518) was a short state highway in Carson City, Nevada serving the state's Stewart Complex. The route originated as State Route 36. It was removed from the state highway system in 2018.

== State Route 520 ==
State Route 520
- Location: Carson City
- Length: 1.227 mi (1.975 km)
- Existed: 1976–2010

State Route 520 (SR 520) was a short state highway in Carson City, Nevada. The route served the central portion of the city, providing access to several government buildings in the capitol district. It was turned over to local control in 2010.

== State Route 525 ==
State Route 525
- Location: Carson City
- Length: 1.323 mi (2.129 km)
- Existed: 1976–2011

State Route 525 (SR 525) was a short state highway in Carson City, Nevada. It covered a portion of College Parkway and all of Airport Road in the northern part of the city. Originally designated in 1976, it was turned over to local control in 2011.

== State Route 529 ==
State Route 529
- Location: Carson City, Nevada
- Length: 1.987 mi (3.198 km)
- Existed: December 29, 1994–November 14, 2018

State Route 529 (SR 529) was a state highway designation that existed concurrently with US 395 Bus. and was the state route designation of the section of the route. At their meeting on November 14, 2018, NDOT's Board of Directors voted to transfer ownership of the remainder of SR 529 (between I-580 and Fairview Drive) to Carson City, in order to facilitate the city's goal to construct a complete streets project on South Carson Street.

== State Route 530 ==
State Route 530
- Location: Carson City
- Length: 1.464 mi (2.356 km)
- Existed: 1994–2010

State Route 530 (SR 530) was a 1.464-mile-long (2.356 km) state highway in Carson City. It followed a portion of William Street and was formerly signed as part of US 50 (and US 395 temporarily). The route was turned over to local control in 2010.

== State Route 531 ==
State Route 531
- Location: Carson City
- Length: 1.645 mi (2.647 km)
- Existed: 1995–2011

State Route 531 (SR 531) was a state highway in Carson City, Nevada. It followed a portion of College Parkway in the northern part of the city. Created by 1995, the highway was turned over to city control in 2011.

== State Route 587 ==
State Route 587
- Location: Las Vegas
- Existed: 1976–c. 2001

== State Route 589 ==
State Route 589
- Location: Las Vegas
- Length: 10.023 mi (16.130 km)
- Existed: 1976–2019

State Route 589 (SR 589) comprised a large portion of Sahara Avenue, a major east–west section line road in the Las Vegas Valley. The road is named after the Sahara Hotel and Casino which is located on Las Vegas Boulevard where it intersects with Sahara Avenue.

== State Route 601 ==
State Route 601
- Location: Las Vegas
- Existed: 1975–c. 2005

State Route 601 was a state highway in the U.S. state of Nevada, running along Main Street in Las Vegas. Its last section was turned over to the city in 2005. SR 601 ran along the full length of Main Street; both ends were at State Route 604 (Las Vegas Boulevard).

== State Route 605 ==
State Route 605
- Location: Paradise
- Length: 2.977 mi (4.791 km)
- Existed: (July 1, 1976 – April 27, 1983)–2001

State Route 605 was a north–south state highway in the Las Vegas urban area. SR 605 comprised a portion of Paradise Road. The route was turned over to local control in 2001. SR 605 began at Tropicana Avenue (SR 593). From there, it followed Paradise Road north to its terminus at Sahara Avenue (SR 589). The portion of Paradise Road from Harmon Avenue (near the Hard Rock Hotel and Casino) south to Tropicana Avenue was a multi-lane one-way street southbound.

Paradise Road is considered the main entrance to Harry Reid International Airport. The northern leg of the Las Vegas Monorail runs down the center of the road for a portion of the route and then along the eastern side to the monorail's northern terminus. RTC Transit Route 108 functions on this road.

Notable attractions on Paradise include:

- Harry Reid International Airport
- Hard Rock Hotel and Casino
- Silver Sevens Hotel and Casino
- Las Vegas Convention Center
- Westgate Las Vegas
- Sahara Las Vegas
- Las Vegas Monorail

State Route 605 was relinquished to local control in 2001.

== State Route 606 ==
State Route 606
- Location: Las Vegas
- Length: 2.07 mi (3.33 km)
- Existed: 1999

State Route 606 was a very short-lived designation along Maryland Parkway in Las Vegas, existing only as documented in the 1999 NDOT Clark County Traffic Report. The report places the route between Flamingo Road and Sahara Avenue. There is no evidence of this route existing before or after 1999.

== State Route 650 ==
State Route 650
- Location: Reno and Sparks
- Existed: 1976–2009

State Route 650 (SR 650) was a state highway in Washoe County, Nevada. The route followed McCarran Boulevard, an arterial ring road serving the cities of Reno and Sparks. The route provided access to many businesses and residential areas in the Truckee Meadows. McCarran Boulevard was gradually constructed through the Reno/Sparks area over a period of several years. The portion east of US 395 was previously designated as SR 650 while the western half was designated SR 651; the two highway numbers were merged into a new SR 659 in 2009.

McCarran Boulevard was named after the late Senator Pat McCarran, a member of the Democratic Party who contributed to the development of aviation both in Las Vegas and on a national scale and was staunchly anti communist.

== State Route 651 ==
State Route 651
- Location: Reno
- Existed: 1976–2009

State Route 651 (SR 651) was a state highway in Washoe County, Nevada. The route followed McCarran Boulevard, an arterial ring road serving the cities of Reno and Sparks. The route provided access to many businesses and residential areas in the Truckee Meadows. McCarran Boulevard was gradually constructed through the Reno/Sparks area over a period of several years. The portion east of US 395 was previously designated as SR 650 while the western half was designated SR 651; the two highway numbers were merged into a new SR 659 in 2009.

McCarran Boulevard was named after the late Senator Pat McCarran, a member of the Democratic Party who contributed to the development of aviation both in Las Vegas and on a national scale and was staunchly anti communist.

== State Route 663 ==
State Route 663
- Location: Reno
- Length: 2.491 mi (4.009 km)
- Existed: 1976–2010

State Route 663 (SR 663) was an east–west state highway in Washoe County, Nevada serving the Reno-Sparks area. The route was turned over to local control in 2010.

Oddie Boulevard was named after former Republican Senator Tasker Oddie.

== State Route 666 ==
State Route 666
- Location: Reno to Sun Valley
- Length: 3.197 mi (5.145 km)
- Existed: c. 1982–1983

== State Route 706 ==
State Route 706
- Location: ??
- Existed: yes

== State Route 758 ==
State Route 758
- Location: Genoa
- Existed: 1976–1995

== State Route 765 ==
State Route 765
- Location: Wells
- Existed: 1976–1995

State Route 765 (SR 765) was the state highway designation for 6th Street (old US 40) in Wells, Nevada until November 30, 1995, when it was given to the city.

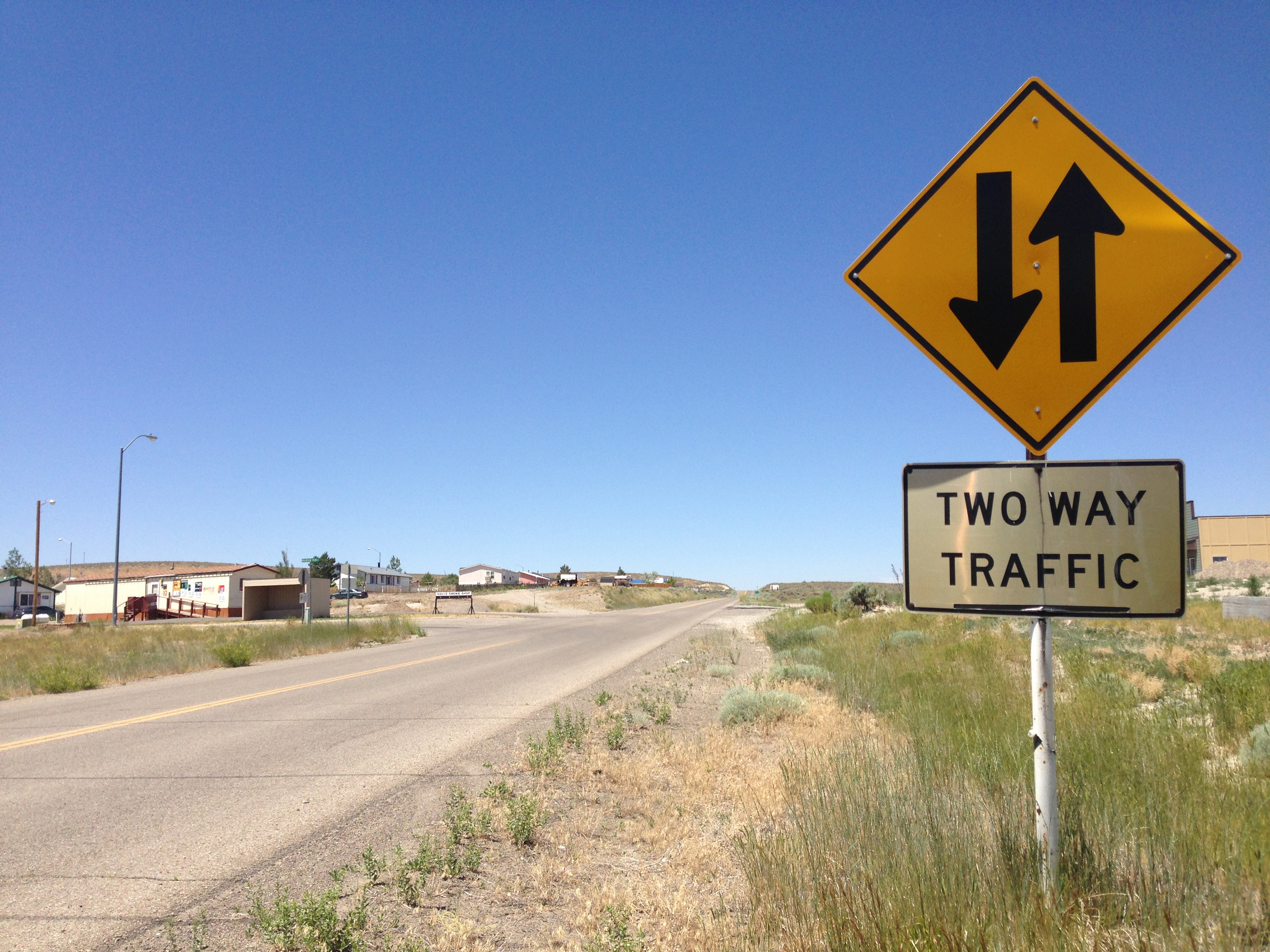
View west along former SR 765

== State Route 780 ==
State Route 780
- Location: Eureka County
- Length: 2.270 mi (3.653 km)
- Existed: 1976–2012

State Route 780 (SR 780) was a state highway in Eureka County, Nevada. SR 780 ran from the Richmond–Eureka Mine east to US 50 in Eureka. It was turned over to local control in 2012.

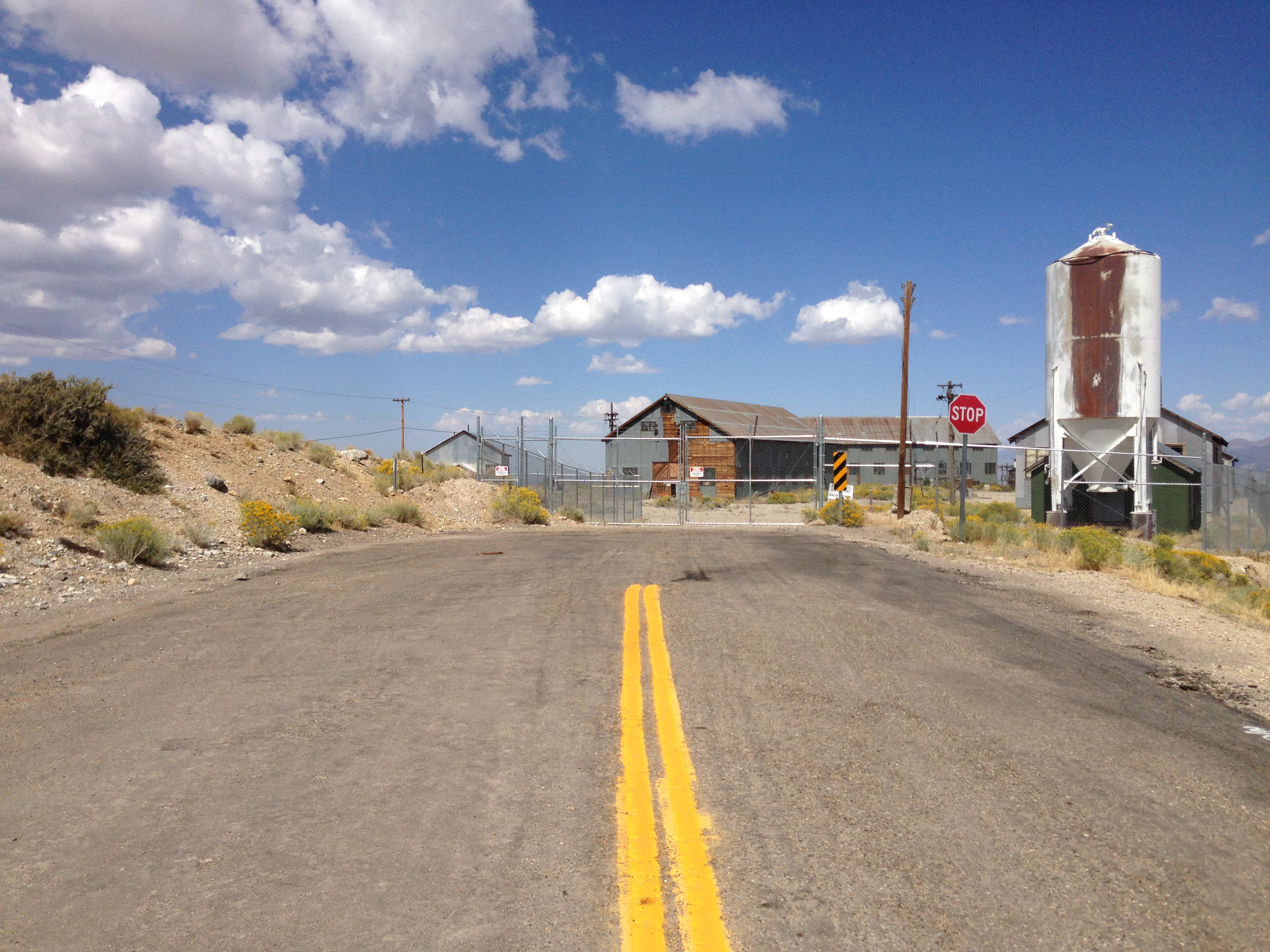
West end of former SR 780 at the Richmond Mine

SR 780 was designated on July 1, 1976. SR 780 was removed from the state highway system and transferred to Eureka County control on January 9, 2012, although the Nevada Department of Transportation will continue to upgrade pavement markings on the old route through 2022.

The entire route was in Eureka County.

Location	mi	km	Destinations	Notes
	0.00	0.00	Richmond–Eureka Mine	Western terminus
Eureka	2.27	3.65	US 50 – Austin, Ely	Eastern terminus
1.000 mi = 1.609 km; 1.000 km = 0.621 mi

== State Route 786 ==
State Route 786
- Location: Winnemucca
- Existed: 1976–c. 2002

== State Route 790 ==
State Route 790
- Location: Golconda
- Existed: 1976–1997
