= Mineral (disambiguation) =

A mineral is a chemical element or compound that is normally crystalline, formed as a result of geological processes.

Mineral may also refer to:

- Mineral water, water containing dissolved minerals of the sense above
- Mineral (nutrient), a chemical element required by living organisms
- Mineral resources, geological deposits (crystalline, non-crystalline, solid, liquid or gas) which potentially can be mined

== Places ==
- Mineral, California
- Mineral, Washington
- Mineral del Monte, Hidalgo, Mexico
- Mineral, Illinois
- Mineral, Oklahoma
- Mineral Township, Bureau County, Illinois, United States
- Mineral Township, Cherokee County, Kansas, United States
- Mineral Township, Barry County, Missouri, United States
- Mineral Township, Venango County, Pennsylvania, United States
- Mineral, Texas
- Mineral, Virginia

== Other uses ==
- Mineral (band), an emo band
- Mineral River, a river in Michigan
- Soft drinks, in some English speaking countries

== See also ==
- Mineral City (disambiguation)
- Mineral County (disambiguation)
