= Red Mountain Wilderness =

Wilderness area in Nevada, United States

Red Mountain Wilderness (Nevada)
- IUCN category Ib (wilderness area)
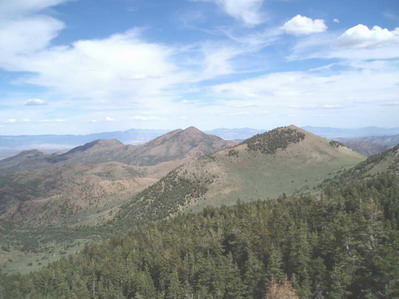

- Location within the United States
- Location: White Pine / Nye counties, Nevada, United States
- Nearest city: Duckwater, Nevada
- Coordinates: 38°54′40″N 115°20′06″W
- Area: 20,490 acres (8,290 ha)
- Established: December 20, 2006
- Governing body: U.S. Forest Service

The Red Mountain Wilderness is a 20,490-acre (8,290 ha) wilderness area in southwestern White Pine County and northeastern Nye County, within the White Pine Range in the U.S. state of Nevada. The Wilderness lies within the Humboldt-Toiyabe National Forest, administered by the U.S. Forest Service.

Bordered by Currant Mountain Wilderness on the west, the Red Mountain Wilderness and White Pine Range Wilderness was created by the "White Pine County Conservation, Recreation and Development Act of 2006". It is characterized by volcanic red-orange hills and mountains covered with pinyon pine, limber pine, and bristlecone pine.

== See also ==
- Nevada Wilderness Areas
- List of wilderness areas in Nevada
- List of U.S. Wilderness Areas
- Wilderness Act
