= White County Courthouse =

White County Courthouse may refer to:

- Old White County Courthouse, Cleveland, Georgia
- White County Courthouse (Arkansas), Searcy, Arkansas

== See also ==
- White Pine County Courthouse
