= Currant Mountain =

Mountain in the American state of Nevada

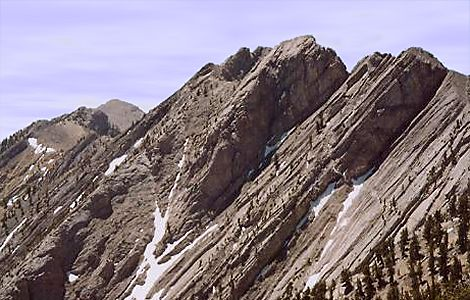

Highest point
- Elevation: 11,518 ft (3,511 m) NAVD 88
- Prominence: 4,575 ft (1,394 m)
- Coordinates: 38°54′35″N 115°25′29″W

Geography
- Location within Nevada
- Location: White Pine County, Nevada, U.S.
- Parent range: White Pine Range
- Topo map: USGS Currant Mountain

Climbing
- Easiest route: From the south ridge: Steep hike & scramble

Currant Mountain is the highest mountain in the White Pine Range in White Pine County, Nevada, United States. It is the twenty-first-highest mountain in the state, and also ranks as the sixteenth-most topographically prominent peak in the state. Its summit consists of a series of three spires on a thin limestone ridge, with the southern spire being the highest at 11,518 feet (3,511 m). To the west are the Duckwater (Shoshone) tribal lands and the northern arm of large Railroad Valley. To the east is the northern part of White River Valley. The peak is located about 37 miles (60 km) southwest of the community of Ely near the Nye County border, within the Currant Mountain Wilderness of the Humboldt-Toiyabe National Forest.

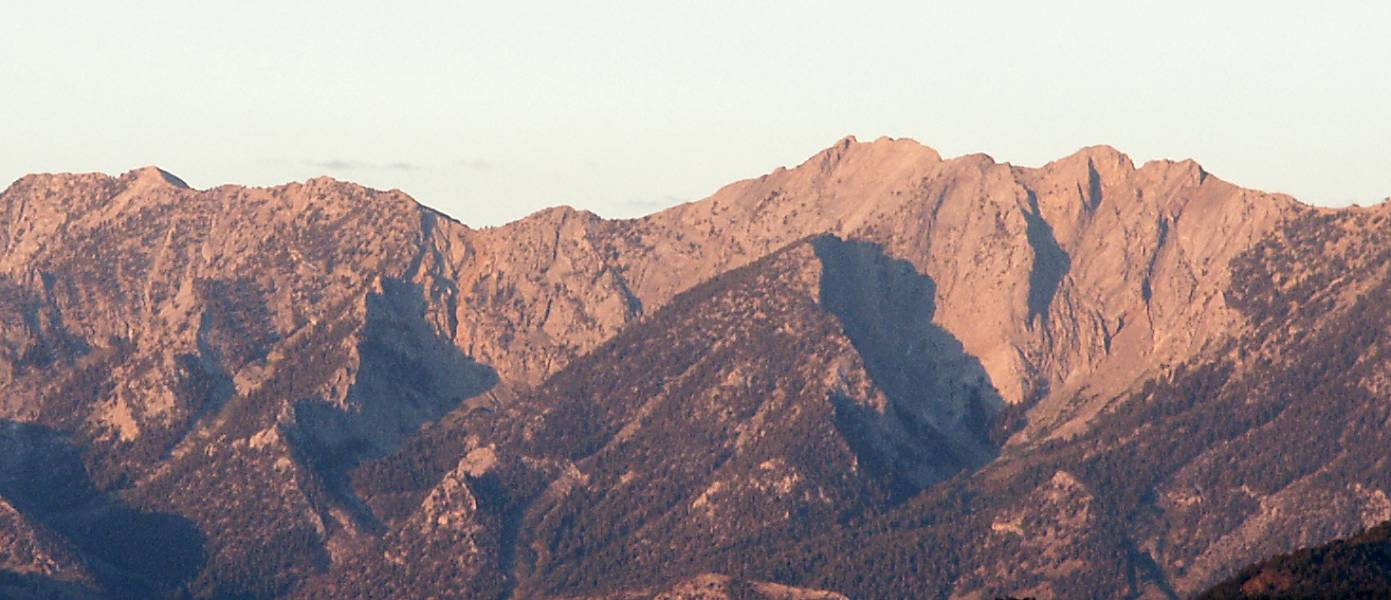
Currant Mountain, looking west at sunrise.
