= Pancake Summit =

Coordinates: 39°24′37″N 115°41′47″W

Pancake Summit is a gap in White Pine County, Nevada, in the United States.

The name is likely descriptive, referring to its resemblance to a stack of pancakes.
