= Kimberly, Nevada =

- Ghost town
- Kimberly in the 1940s

- Location within Nevada
- Coordinates: 39°15′47″N 115°01′23″W
- Country: United States
- State: Nevada
- County: White Pine
- Elevation: 7,238 ft (2,206 m)
- Time zone: UTC-8 (Mountain (MST))
  - Summer (DST): UTC-7 (PDT)
- Area code: 775
- GNIS ID: 845525

Kimberly is a ghost town in the state of Nevada. A mining town situated west of Riepetown and east of the former town of Veteran, Kimberly once boasted over 500 inhabitants.

While copper was found in the mountaines near Kimberly in 1877, the town did not develop as such until around the turn of the twentieth century. It grew as a company town to about 100 residents prior to 1907, when the Nevada Northern Railway spur into Veteran was completed. In 1910, Consolidated Copper purchased the Kimberly landsite, by which time the community had established its own post office and school district. By the 1920s Kimberly had a hospital and over 500 residents, but the Great Depression brought an economic downturn to the area, and it slowly began to depopulate.

The population was estimated at 200 in 1940.

Kimberly was purchased by Kennecott Copper in 1958, and in 1959 the mills and buildings were demolished. The former townsite is now a large open-pit mine.

The post office was in operation from July 1905 until December 1958.

== People from Kimberly ==
- Buster Warenski
