= Shellback Wilderness =

Wilderness area in Nevada, United States

- IUCN category Ib (wilderness area)
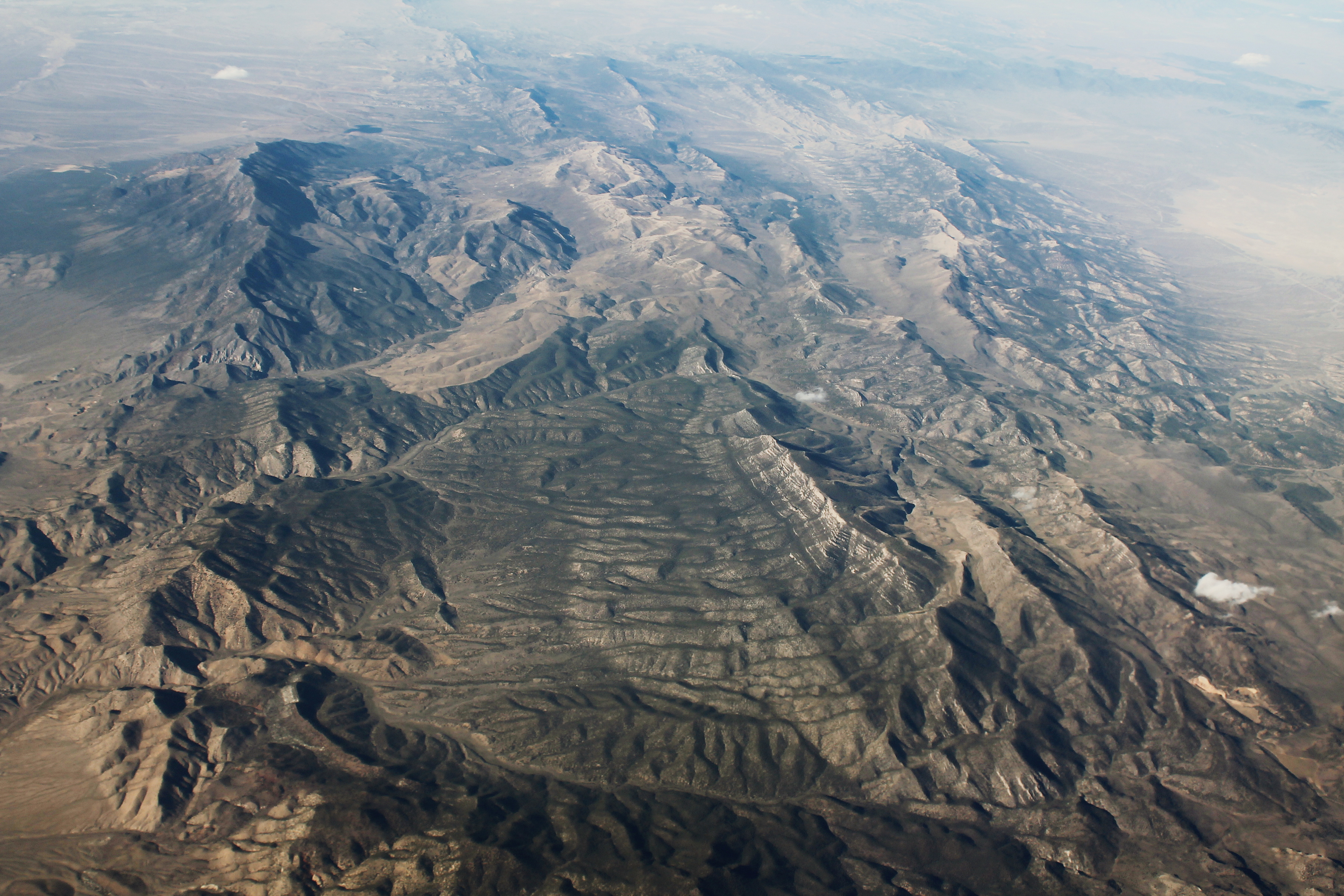
- Aerial view of Shellback

- Location within the United States
- Location: White Pine County, Nevada, United States
- Nearest city: Sunnyside, Nevada
- Coordinates: 39°17′41″N 115°21′19″W
- Area: 36,143 acres (14,627 ha)
- Established: December 20, 2006
- Governing body: U.S. Forest Service

Shellback Wilderness is a 36,143-acre (14,627 ha) wilderness area in western White Pine County, in the U.S. state of Nevada. The Wilderness lies within the Humboldt-Toiyabe National Forest and is therefore administered by the U.S. Forest Service.

Located just north of the Bald Mountain and White Pine Range Wilderness Areas, the Shellback Wilderness was created by the White Pine County Conservation, Recreation and Development Act of 2006. Moorman Ridge dominates the skyline at 9,052 feet (2,759 m). The western slope of the Wilderness contains several springs and lush vegetation, whereas the eastern slope is much more arid.

== See also ==
- List of wilderness areas in Nevada
- List of U.S. Wilderness Areas
- Wilderness Act
