= Regan, Nevada =

- Ghost town
- Location within the state of Nevada Regan, Nevada (the United States)
- Coordinates: 39°47′05″N 114°10′35″W
- Country: United States
- State: Nevada
- County: White Pine
- Elevation: 6,864 ft (2,092 m)
- Time zone: UTC-8 (Pacific (PST))
  - Summer (DST): UTC-7 (PDT)
- GNIS feature ID: 858305

Regan is a ghost town, a historical mining town, and a former populated place in White Pine County, Nevada. It had its own Regan post office from August 1906 to November 1907. Its site lies at an elevation of 6,863 feet (2,092 meters) in Tippett Canyon in the South Mountains.
