= Mineral City =

Mineral City may refer to the following places in the United States:

- Mineral City, Arizona, a ghost town.
- Mineral City, Florida
- Mineral City, Indiana
- Mineral City, Missouri
- Mineral City, Nevada
- Mineral City, Ohio
- Mineral City, Washington, a ghost town.
- Mineral City, West Virginia
