= Cave Lake State Park =

State park in Nevada, United States

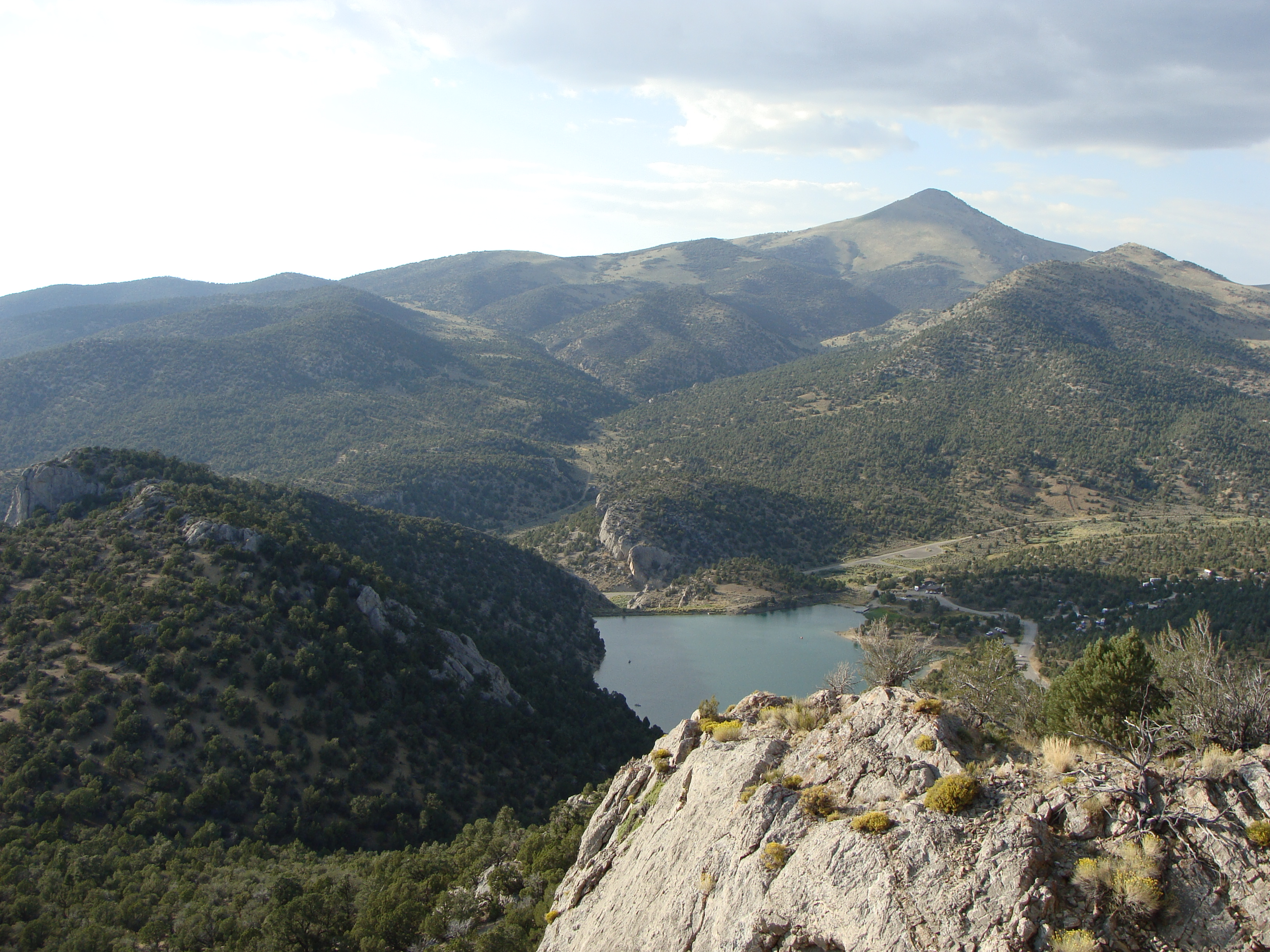
- Cave Lake from the Overlook Trail

- Location within Nevada
- Interactive map of Cave Lake State Park
- Location: White Pine County, Nevada, United States
- Nearest city: Ely, Nevada
- Coordinates: 39°11′23″N 114°43′21″W
- Area: 4,081.40 acres (1,651.68 ha)
- Elevation: 7,198 ft (2,194 m)
- Established: 1973
- Administrator: Nevada Division of State Parks
- Visitors: 17,718 vehicles (in 2017)
- Designation: Nevada state park
- Website: Official website

Cave Lake State Park is a public recreation area occupying more than 4,000 acres (1,600 ha) in the Schell Creek Range, adjacent to Humboldt National Forest, in White Pine County, Nevada. The state park is located at an elevation of 7,300 feet (2,200 m) five miles (8.0 km) southeast of Ely and is accessed via U.S. Route 50 and Success Summit Road. It features a 32-acre (13 ha) reservoir for fishing and flat-wake boating.

== History ==
The Cave Creek Dam which created Cave Lake was constructed in 1932. The facility was purchased by the Nevada Department of Wildlife in 1971 for $10. Two years later it was transferred to Nevada State Parks. The park saw an increase in size of 2,980 acres (1,210 ha) with the completion of a land transfer from the U.S. Forest Service in 2015.

== Activities and amenities ==
The park is popular for brown and rainbow trout fishing, ice fishing, crawdadding, camping, and picnicking. Hiking is offered on four developed trails, three to five miles in length. For overnight stays, the park offers a yurt and two designated campgrounds, Elk Flat and Lake View, with modern facilities. Winter activities include ice fishing, ice skating, cross-country skiing, and snowmobiling. The park hosts events as part of Ely's annual Fire and Ice Festival held in January, sufficient ice and snow permitting. The event, which began in 2003, features an ice and snow sculpture contest, and concludes with a fireworks show.
