= Mount Moriah Wilderness =

Wilderness area in the American state of Nevada

Mt. Moriah Wilderness
- IUCN category Ib (wilderness area)
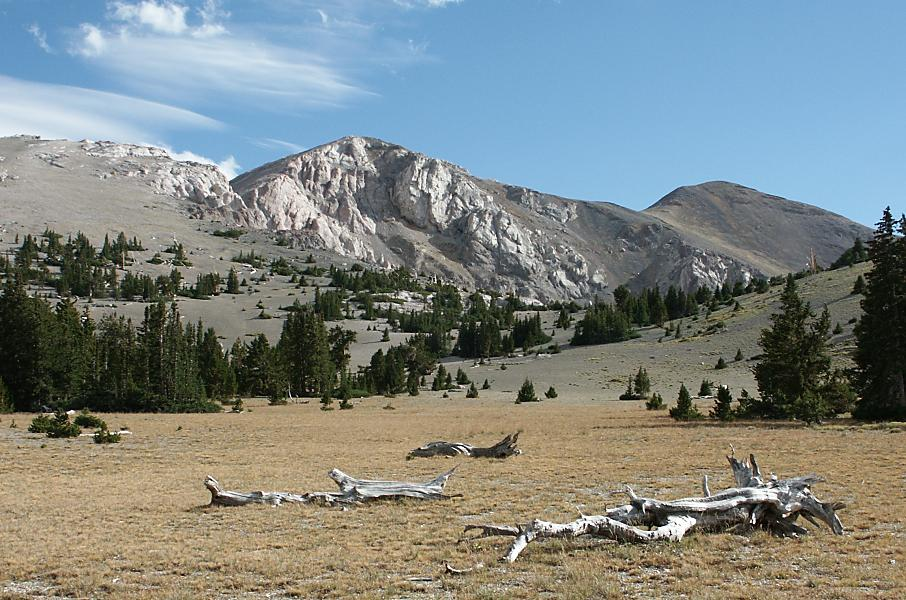
- Mt. Moriah in Mt. Moriah Wilderness

- Location within the United States
- Location: White Pine County, Nevada, United States
- Nearest city: Ely, NV
- Coordinates: 39°16′N 114°12′W
- Area: 89,790 acres (36,340 ha)
- Established: December 5, 1989
- Governing body: U.S. Forest Service & U.S. Bureau of Land Management

The Mt. Moriah Wilderness is a 89,790-acre (36,340 ha) wilderness area in the northern part of the Snake Range of White Pine County, in the eastern section of the state of Nevada in the western United States.

The Mt. Moriah Wilderness was designated in 1989 and is administered by the Humboldt-Toiyabe National Forest and the U.S. Bureau of Land Management, as some 8,700 acres (3,500 ha) in the northern portion of the Wilderness lies on BLM land.

== Topography ==
Mount Moriah, the namesake of the Wilderness, rises 12,050 feet (3,670 m) above the Snake Valley on its east flank and the Spring Valley on the west. At 11,000 feet (3,400 m) and stretching north and west of the peak is a unique plateau called the Table. Much of the area is composed of limestone and shallow caves are common in the Wilderness.

== Archeology ==
Archaeological sites including caves utilized by Native Americans, pictographs, and lithic scatters are found in the Wilderness.

== Vegetation ==
See: Category:Flora of the Great Basin

The Mount Moriah Wilderness lies within the Intermountain sagebrush/ponderosa pine ecosystem and vegetation varies with the elevation. Pinyon pine and juniper dominate the lower slopes, while aspen, mountain mahogany, white and Douglas fir, limber pine, and bristlecone pine are found in the upper elevations.

== Wildlife ==
A variety of wildlife and fish species inhabit the Mt. Moriah Wilderness. The majority of the area is summer range for mule deer, although some of the lower elevation benches and riparian areas are used year-round. Rocky Mountain bighorn sheep can be found throughout the year in the area, as well as blue grouse, sage grouse, and chukar. Rainbow trout, brook trout, and the unique Bonneville cutthroat trout are found in the area's perennial streams, including Hampton Creek, Hendry's Creek, and Smith Creek.

== See also ==
- Nevada Wilderness Areas
- List of wilderness areas in Nevada
- List of U.S. Wilderness Areas
- Wilderness Act
