= Ward Charcoal Ovens State Historic Park =

State park in Nevada, United States

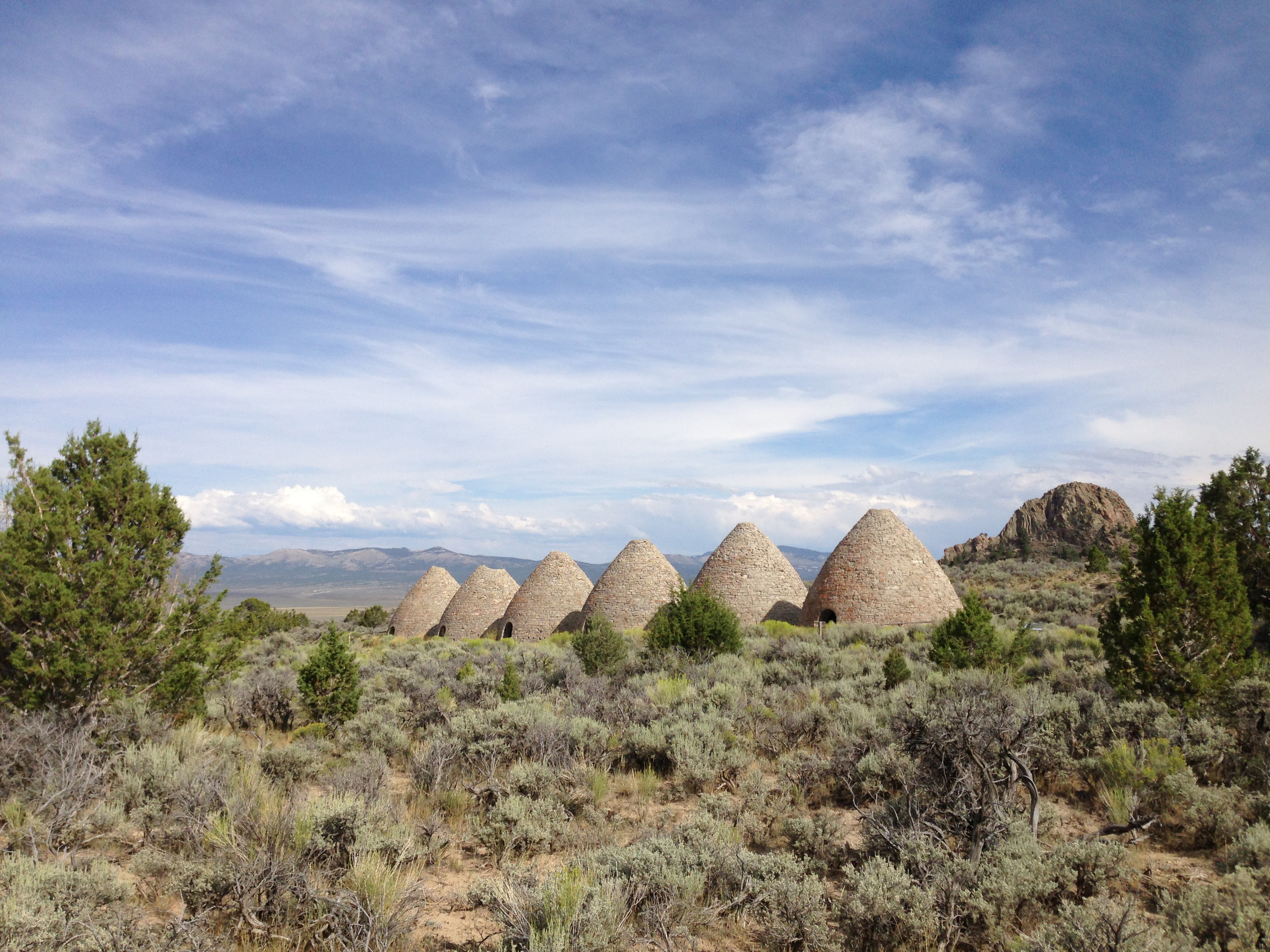

- Location within Nevada
- Location: White Pine County, Nevada, United States
- Nearest city: Ely, Nevada
- Coordinates: 39°02′06″N 114°50′52″W
- Area: 861.15 acres (348.50 ha)
- Elevation: 7,054 ft (2,150 m)
- Established: 1969
- Administrator: Nevada Division of State Parks
- Visitors: 2,532 vehicles (in 2017)
- Designation: Nevada state historic park
- Website: Official website
- Ward Charcoal Ovens
- U.S. National Register of Historic Places
- Nevada Historical Markers No. 184
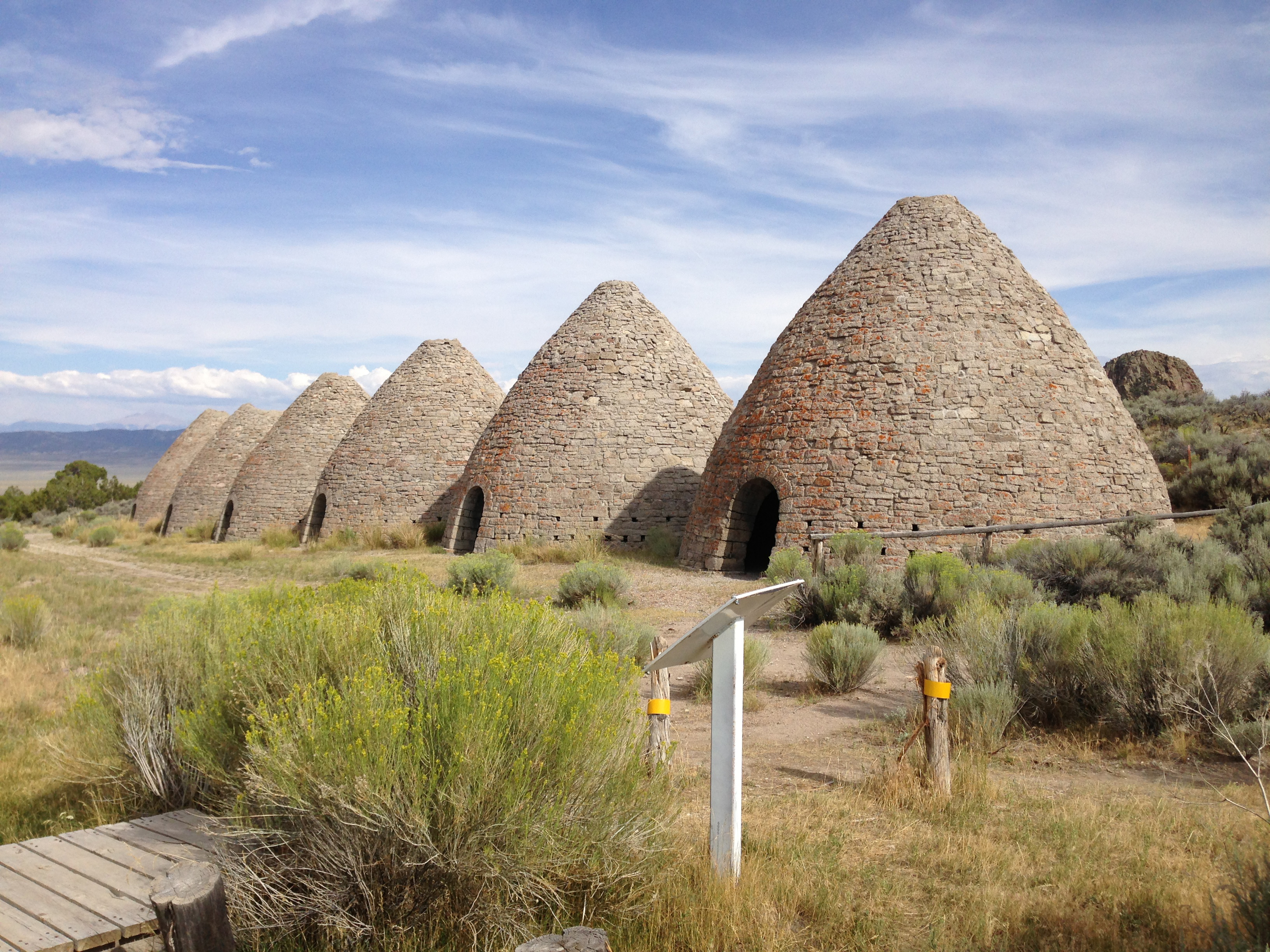
- Location: White Pine County, Nevada
- Nearest city: Ely, Nevada
- Area: 1 acre (0.40 ha)
- Built: 1876
- NRHP reference No.: 71000491
- Markers No.: 184
- Added to NRHP: September 28, 1971

Ward Charcoal Ovens State Historic Park is an area designated for historic preservation and public recreation located 20 miles (32 km) south of the town of Ely in White Pine County, Nevada. The 700-acre (280 ha) state park protects beehive-shaped charcoal ovens constructed in the latter half of the 19th century.

== History ==
Ovens

The charcoal ovens are associated with the silver mining ghost town of Ward, Nevada, established in 1876. The town at its peak had a population of 1500, two newspapers, a school, a fire department, two smelters, and a stamp mill. The town declined after 1880, with a fire in 1883 destroying a third of the town. The post office closed in 1888. Mining revived briefly in the 1930s and 1960s. The town has been mostly destroyed by repeated flash flooding due to its low-lying site. Only the smelter, mill foundations, and cemetery are left.

The charcoal ovens are two miles to the south of the townsite. Six large ovens remain in excellent repair, 30 feet (9.1 m) high, 27 feet (8.2 m) in diameter, with walls 2 feet (0.61 m) thick at the base. The ovens were in operation from 1876 through 1879. They were built of quartz latite welded tuff by itinerant Swiss Italian masons known as carbonari, who specialized in the ovens. The beehive shape was designed as a more efficient version of the open-pit system that originated in Italy. The charcoal ovens prepared charcoal from locally harvested timber for use in the smelters at Ward, using 30 to 60 bushels of charcoal per ton of ore, for 16,000 bushels (563,840 liters) a day. The Ward ovens are the best-preserved of their kind in Nevada. They were listed in the National Register of Historic Places in 1971.

Park

The area was under private ownership and management until 1956 when the Nevada State Park Commission was offered a permit to protect the ovens. Two privately owned parcels were transferred to the Nevada Department of Wildlife in 1968; and in 1969, 160 acres (64.8 ha) were transferred to the state park system to create a state monument. The area was designated a state park in 1994 when recreational facilities were added.

== Activities and amenities ==
The park offers camping, picnicking, and hiking and mountain biking trails.
