= Tungstonia, Nevada =

- Ghost town
- Location within Nevada
- Coordinates: 39°39′27″N 114°09′52″W
- Country: United States
- State: Nevada
- District: White Pine County
- Elevation: 7,648 ft (2,331 m)
- Time zone: UTC-8 (Pacific)
  - Summer (DST): UTC-7 (PDT)

Tungstonia, Nevada, is a ghost town on the Southern flank of the Kern Mountains of Eastern White Pine County, Nevada, along Tungstonia Wash.

== History ==
Tungsten was discovered here in 1910 by George Sims and C. Olsen, and full-scale mining began in 1914 with the introduction of two companies from Utah: the Salt Lake Tungstonia Mines Company and the Utah-Nevada Mining and Milling company. The community that developed in support of the mining operations reached a population of about fifty in 1916, with the usual kind of business commensurate with a mining camp of this size, including "a couple of saloons and stores, a boardinghouse, and several wood-frame buildings." The community was also briefly granted a post office, under the name Tugstonia, which served the locale from January 4 to August 3, 1917. Kirby Smith served as the postmaster.

After the Salt Lake Tungstonia Mines Company ceased operations in early 1918, the population dwindled precipitously immediately thereafter. That company's property was leased by the Griffin Mining Company during the summer of 1918, but this venture proved fruitless and most of the remaining residents abandoned the site.

The area saw a brief resurgence in the years 1935-1942 when three new mines, the Dandy, the Whiskey Bottle, and the Tungstonia, renewed activity; only sporadic leasing activity has occurred in the district since 1942, with the total valuation of ores removed around $126,000.
