= Veteran, Nevada =

- Ghost town
- Location within Nevada
- Coordinates: 39°16′03″N 115°01′46″W
- Country: United States
- State: Nevada
- County: White Pine
- Elevation: 7,339 ft (2,237 m)
- Time zone: UTC-8 (Mountain (MST))
  - Summer (DST): UTC-7 (PDT)
- Area code: 775
- GNIS ID: 850913

Veteran is a ghost town in the state of Nevada, USA, just west of the present-day town of Ruth. It was the site of a tent city and mining town between 1906 and 1914, though the current site is abandoned.

When copper ore was discovered in the vicinity of Veteran in 1906, a company town for the Cumberland-Ely Copper Company was constructed in a matter of months. A rail line was completed into Veteran in 1907, which was the western terminus for the Nevada Northern Railway. At its peak around 1910, the town had over 100 inhabitants. Due to a crash in ore prices in 1913, Veteran's buildings were relocated to Ruth the following year and the town was disbanded. Open-pit mining continued in the area until at least the 1950s and today the former townsite is excavated earth.
