= Lane City, Nevada =

Abandoned settlement in Nevada, USA

- Ghost town
- Location within Nevada
- Coordinates: 39°15′36″N 114°55′52″W
- Country: United States
- State: Nevada
- County: White Pine
- Elevation: 6,598 ft (2,011 m)
- Time zone: UTC-8 (Mountain (MST))
  - Summer (DST): UTC-7 (PDT)
- Area code: 775
- GNIS ID: 845529

Lane City or Mineral City was a settlement in White Pine County, Nevada. It is now a ghost town.

A mining camp was founded in 1869 just west of Ely, Nevada, and named Mineral City until 1876. Since Mineral City lay on the Central Overland Route, a stagecoach stop followed, and by 1872, the boomtown had a post office and more than 600 inhabitants. In 1896 the town was renamed Lane City for Charles D. Lane, following his purchase of Chainman, a major local mining and milling operation. The remnants of the town lie along what is now US 50.
