= Mount Grafton Wilderness =

Wilderness area in Nevada

- IUCN category Ib (wilderness area)
- Location within the United States
- Location: White Pine / Lincoln counties, Nevada, United States
- Nearest city: Lund, Nevada
- Coordinates: 38°41′53″N 114°44′55″W
- Area: 78,754 acres (31,871 ha)
- Established: December 20, 2006
- Governing body: U.S. Bureau of Land Management

Mount Grafton Wilderness is a 78,754-acre (31,871 ha) wilderness area in southern White Pine County and northern Lincoln County, in the U.S. state of Nevada. The Wilderness lies approximately 30 miles (48 km) south of the town of Ely and is administered by the U.S. Bureau of Land Management.

The high point and namesake of the Wilderness is 10,990-foot (3,350 m) Mount Grafton, a peak in the Schell Creek Range and important summer habitat for many species of wildlife including elk, mule deer, Rocky Mountain bighorn sheep, and mountain lion. Extensive forested areas of Mount Grafton Wilderness include pinyon pine, juniper, aspen, limber and bristlecone pine, and white fir.

== See also ==
- List of wilderness areas in Nevada
- List of U.S. Wilderness Areas
- Wilderness Act
