= Bald Mountain Wilderness =

Protected area in Nevada, United States

- IUCN category Ib (wilderness area)
- Location within the United States
- Location: White Pine County, Nevada, United States
- Nearest city: Ely, Nevada
- Coordinates: 39.0773090°N 115.3221130°W
- Area: 22,366 acres (9,051 ha)
- Established: December 20, 2006
- Administrator: U.S. Forest Service

The Bald Mountain Wilderness is a 22,366-acre (9,051 ha) wilderness area in White Pine County, in the U.S. state of Nevada. The Wilderness lies within the Humboldt-Toiyabe National Forest and is administered by the U.S. Forest Service.

Located in the heart of the White Pine Range, Bald Mountain Wilderness was created by the White Pine County Conservation, Recreation and Development Act of 2006.

== See also ==
- List of wilderness areas in Nevada
- List of U.S. Wilderness Areas
- Wilderness Act
