= White Pine County Courthouse =

- U.S. National Register of Historic Places
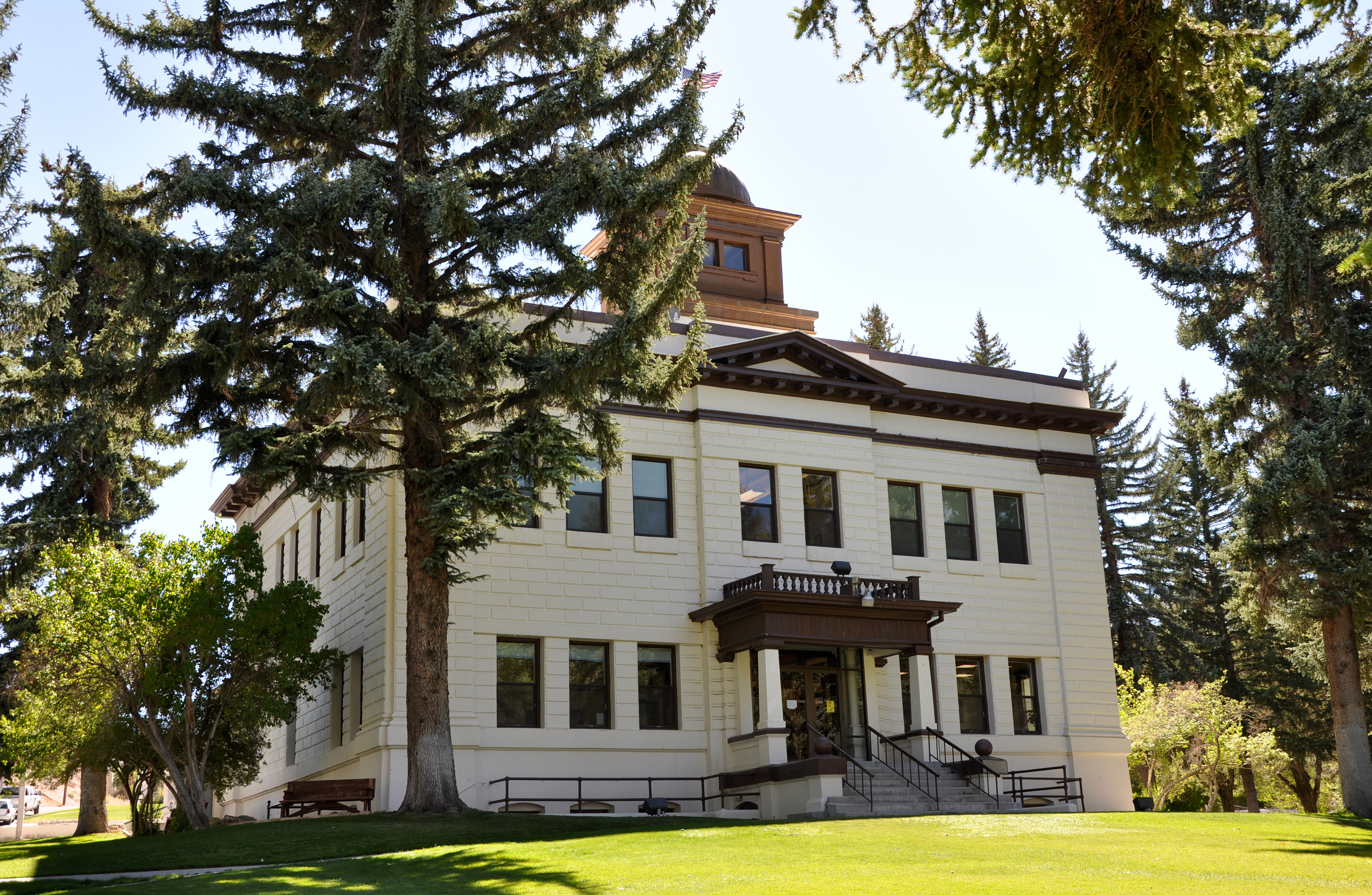
- White Pine County Courthouse

- Location within Nevada Location within the United States
- Interactive map showing the location of White Pine County Courthouse
- Location: Campton St., Ely, Nevada
- Coordinates: 39°14′52″N 114°53′17″W
- Built: 1908
- Architect: Beardslee, George T.; Et al.
- Architectural style: Italianate, Italianate Survival
- NRHP reference No.: 86001958
- Added to NRHP: September 11, 1986

The White Pine County Courthouse was built in 1908 in Ely, Nevada, located in White Pine County. The building was added to the National Register of Historic Places in 1986. By 2017, the county had begun plans to construct a new courthouse because of security concerns with the current one. A new courthouse began construction in 2019; after completion, the old courthouse was expected to be converted into county administrative offices. Several earlier proposals had been made for a new courthouse.

== Overview ==
The two-story Italianate building, made of stone, is crowned by a small copper-domed cupola. The building is sited on a hilltop near the commercial section of Ely, with the city's middle school, library, senior citizen center, several houses, and a park in close proximity. A World War I memorial plaque is located in front of the courthouse, and lists 35 White Pine County residents who died during the war.

The courthouse was built in 1908, and replaced a temporary wood frame courthouse that itself replaced a structure that burned in 1885 in the former county seat of Hamilton. A copper boom allowed the county to invest in the present substantial two-story structure, designed by George T. Beardslee and built by R.E. Dodson and G.W. Weller for $49,688. A two-story jail was added to the rear in 1925.

The courthouse was listed on the National Register of Historic Places on September 11, 1986. A seating area was added outside the courthouse in 2004. By June 2005, the building had received new paint and carpeting.

== Security risks and new courthouse proposals ==
By the mid-1960s, the jail and a sheriff's office located inside the courthouse were deemed as no longer secure. A new courthouse was proposed in 1966, as part of a civic complex that would include other buildings. As of 1967, the county commission favored a new courthouse complex, but the project did not materialize because of concerns about square footage and construction costs. A structure known as the Public Safety building was later opened elsewhere in Ely in 1976, to house the jail and sheriff facilities.

In 2005, a funding bill to construct a new $11 million judicial facility was rejected by the Nevada Legislature. In September 2006, the county commission voted unanimously to spend $100,000 to $120,000 to hire two bailiffs for the courthouse, a recommendation that came from Seventh Judicial Judge Dan L. Papez, who worked in the building. Prior to that time, deputies from the county police department worked as bailiffs during trials and were also supposed to visit the courthouse twice on days when trials were not being held. However, because of other duties, deputies did not always have time to visit the courthouse.

Papez also noted that some of Nevada's most dangerous criminals were kept at Ely State Prison and were sometimes brought to the courthouse. The Ely Times, the local newspaper, wrote at the time, "Security at the courthouse now is haphazard at best and non-existent the majority of the time. While there is a metal detector at the top of the stairs on the second floor, all of the courthouse doors stay unlocked throughout the day. And people who take the elevator to the second floor avoid the single metal detector." Papez planned to start having all entrances locked during the day, aside from the main entrance.

In February 2007, Nevada governor Jim Gibbons and State Senator Bob Beers of Las Vegas toured the courthouse and joined a list of judges and lawmakers who supported the construction of a new, $14 million judicial complex. State funding was required for a new courthouse, but lawmakers had concerns about the ability of the county to pay for future expenses at the new facility. To alleviate these concerns, the county planned to introduce a draft proposal which would pay for the new facility's daily operations in the form of a pre-funded $4 million courthouse trust.

In March 2007, Nevada Supreme Court Chief Justice William Maupin called the courthouse "one of the most dangerous locations in this state," saying, "Nevada's most dangerous criminal defendants, those incarcerated at the Ely State Prison, frequently appear in court in Ely and sit in a witness box that is within arm's reach of juror positions one and two." In his proposed budget, Gibbons included $6.5 million for a new county judicial facility. State lawmakers reduced the amount to $1.5 million, to pay for updated security measures at the current courthouse. In June 2007, five Democratic state lawmakers from Clark County eliminated funding for the courthouse entirely.

In October 2007, the United States Marshals Service completed a federal study of the building, as requested by Papez. Vincent Freiburger of the U.S. Marshals Service wrote in his report, "Not only is the site location unacceptable, but the facility will never meet minimum security standards based upon design and infrastructure issues." At the time, Justice Court proceedings were held in the building's small basement, which lacked an emergency exit. Plumbing and electrical lines were also exposed throughout the structure. The U.S. Marshals Service report confirmed earlier findings in 2003 by the Nevada Supreme Court's Commission on Rural Courts. Freiburger made a recommendation to the county to find an alternative courthouse location, stating, "Should a serious security breach occur, the close proximity could endanger residents and many of the middle school children in the immediate area."

The courthouse remained open as there were no other court facilities in the county. In January 2010, Papez said that security had improved at the courthouse and that he felt comfortable being in the building. Papez also said that he and his staff were working to further improve security. In March 2010, the Seventh Judicial District Court banned visitors from carrying weapons inside the building.

=== New facility ===
By January 2017, a new courthouse complex was being planned for construction on a different parcel of land in Ely, adjacent to the Public Safety building. The new courthouse was proposed due to the security concerns regarding the old courthouse, where District and Justice Court trials continued to be held. At the time, the first floor was occupied by several county offices, including separate offices for the treasurer and the county clerk. Justice Court proceedings were still being held in the building's basement, and the close proximity between the jury box and inmates who are on trial remained a security concern. A request by the county for $10 million was submitted to the Nevada Legislature to aid in the funding of a new courthouse/jail facility, which was expected to cost a total of $25 million to $30 million.

Regarding security concerns, District Attorney Mike Wheable said, "A high security inmate whose already serving a life sentence, what does he have to lose? And let's talk about what's going on, outside of the courthouse? You have recess for the middle school kids at the park, mothers and fathers taking their kids to the library and senior citizens meeting up to have lunch at the Senior Center, while here's a full CERT team armed with assault rifles and shotguns, on the perimeter of the building, on the back steps, and on the roof. These two circles are overlapping". Ely mayor Melody VanCamp said, "The building is in such tough shape that it's not worth the money in trying to make it safe to have prisoners there and bring them in... our courthouse isn't secure enough to have the trials and arraignments. They can't make it secure enough. It's too much hassle, too much trouble."

In June 2017, no action was taken on the funding request, leaving the White Pine County Commission to choose between remodeling the courthouse or the city's jail. In September 2017, the USDA Rural Development government agency approved a $9 million loan to the county to help finance a new justice center, including a 38,000 sq ft (3,500 m^{2}) courthouse. The facility was projected to cost $17.7 million, and was scheduled to begin construction in 2018. The original courthouse was planned to be converted into county administrative offices after the new courthouse facility was completed.

In April 2019, the county sought $10 million from the state to help finance construction of the new justice facility, with completion expected between December 2019 and September 2021. The state approved $5 million for the new, two-floor facility in June 2019, and a groundbreaking ceremony was held for it on September 24, 2019. A grand opening ceremony for the new facility took place on October 27, 2021.
