= Becky Peak Wilderness =

Protected area in Nevada, United States

- IUCN category Ib (wilderness area)
- Location within the United States
- Location: White Pine County, Nevada, United States
- Nearest city: McGill, Nevada
- Coordinates: 39°59′07″N 114°35′06″W
- Area: 18,119 acres (7,332 ha)
- Established: December 20, 2006
- Governing body: U.S. Bureau of Land Management

Becky Peak Wilderness is a 18,119-acre (7,332 ha) wilderness area in White Pine County, in the U.S. state of Nevada. Located north of the town of Mcgill, the Wilderness was created by the White Pine County Conservation, Recreation and Development Act of 2006 and is administered by the U.S. Bureau of Land Management.

Located at the northern end of the Schell Creek Range, vegetation in the Wilderness consists primarily of desert brush and grass at the lower elevations and a scattering of pinyon pine and juniper stands on the upland slopes of Becky Peak and surrounding hillsides.

== See also ==
- List of wilderness areas in Nevada
- List of U.S. Wilderness Areas
- Wilderness Act
