= Bristlecone Wilderness =

Protected area in Nevada, United States

- IUCN category Ib (wilderness area)
- Location within Nevada Location within the United States
- Location: White Pine County, Nevada, United States
- Nearest city: McGill, Nevada
- Coordinates: 39°24′N 114°53′W
- Area: 14,095 acres (5,704 ha)
- Established: December 20, 2006
- Governing body: U.S. Bureau of Land Management

Bristlecone Wilderness is a 14,095-acre (5,704 ha) wilderness area in White Pine County, in the U.S. state of Nevada. Located in the Egan Range approximately five miles west of the town of Mcgill, the Wilderness was created by the "White Pine County Conservation, Recreation and Development Act of 2006" and is administered by the U.S. Bureau of Land Management.

Vegetation in the Wilderness consists primarily of desert brush and grass at the lower elevations and a scattering of pinyon pine, juniper, and the namesake bristlecone pine stands on the upland slopes. Groves of aspen exist in several washes, including Rattlesnake Canyon.

== See also ==
- List of wilderness areas in Nevada
- List of U.S. Wilderness Areas
- Wilderness Act
