= Currant Mountain Wilderness =

Protected area in Nevada, United States

- IUCN category Ib (wilderness area)
- Location within Nevada Location within the United States
- Location: Nye / White Pine counties, Nevada United States
- Nearest city: Ely, Nevada
- Coordinates: 38.9124356°N 115.4239177°W
- Area: 47,357 acres (19,165 ha)
- Established: December 5, 1989
- Governing body: U.S. Forest Service

The Currant Mountain Wilderness is a 47,357-acre (19,165 ha) wilderness area centered on Currant Mountain in the White Pine Range of Nye County and White Pine County, in the eastern section of the state of Nevada in the western United States.

The Currant Mountain Wilderness is bordered on the north by the White Pine Range Wilderness, on the east by the Red Mountain Wilderness, and is administered by the Humboldt-Toiyabe National Forest. The nearest city is Ely, Nevada. Currant Mountain is a habitat for ancient Pinus longaeva - Great Basin Bristlecone Pines.

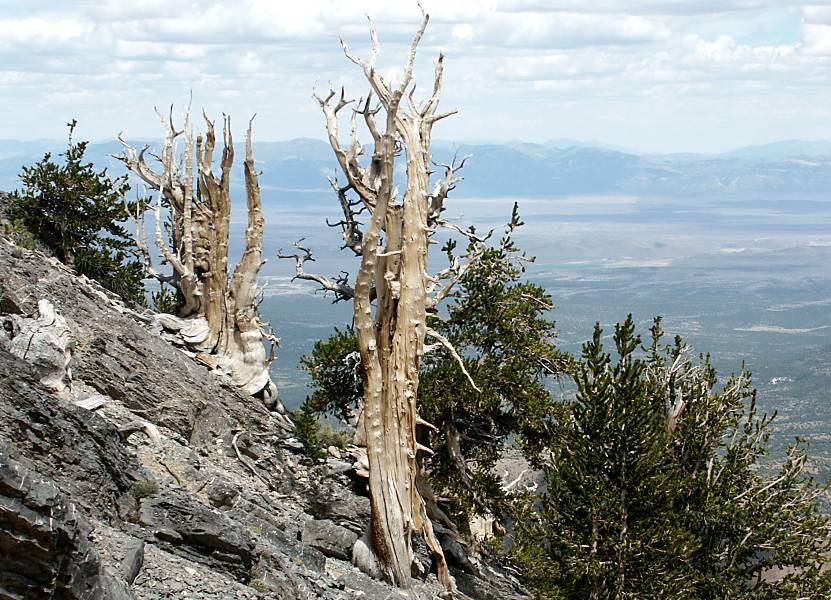
Pinus longaeva - Great Basin Bristlecone Pines in the Currant Mountain Wilderness Area

== See also ==
- List of wilderness areas in Nevada
- List of U.S. Wilderness Areas
- Wilderness Act
