= Riepetown, Nevada =

Unincorporated community in Nevada, US

- Ghost town
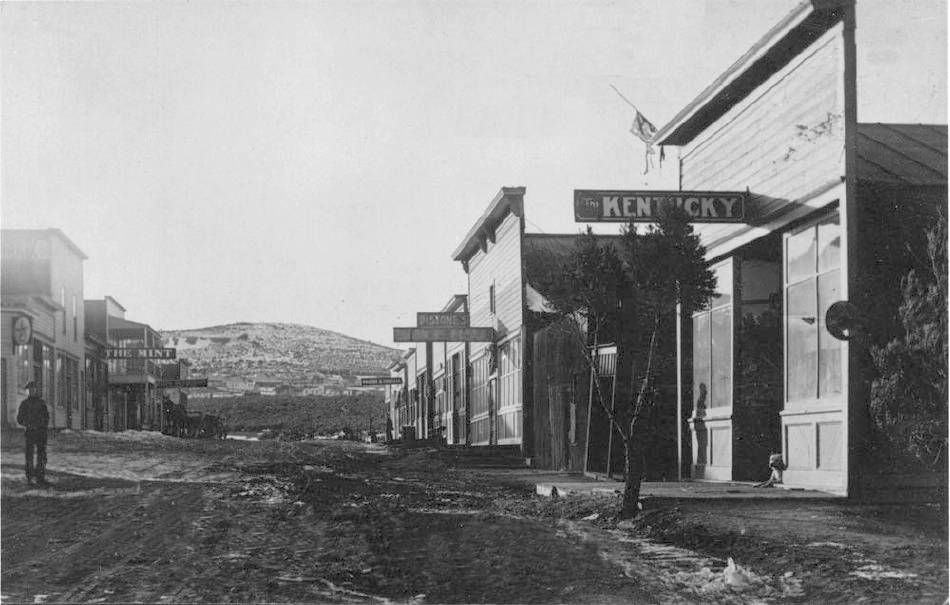
- Riepetown, circa 1905

- Location within Nevada
- Coordinates: 39°15′52″N 115°0′39″W
- Country: United States
- State: Nevada
- County: White Pine
- Elevation: 7,100 ft (2,200 m)
- GNIS feature ID: 856354

Riepetown is a ghost town in White Pine County, Nevada, United States. Riepetown is located on former State Route 485, 3 miles southwest of its junction with U.S. Route 50; 5 miles northwest of Ely.

== History ==
Riepetown was named for Richard A. Riepe, a first-generation German immigrant who surveyed the land in this area. Riepe was later elected to the Nevada Assembly, representing Lincoln County in 1883 and White Pine County in 1889.

Riepetown was not a company town and thus played host to businesses banned in other mining communities, such as brothels and saloons. It was decimated by a massive fire in 1917, and though portions were rebuilt, the town gradually depopulated.
