= Government Peak Wilderness =

Wilderness area in Nevada, United States

- IUCN category Ib (wilderness area)
- Location within the United States
- Location: White Pine County, Nevada, United States
- Nearest city: Baker, Nevada
- Coordinates: 39.5042357934°N 114.167585757°W
- Area: 6,313 acres (2,555 ha)
- Established: December 20, 2006
- Governing body: U.S. Bureau of Land Management

Government Peak Wilderness is a 6,313-acre (2,555 ha) wilderness area in the northern part of the Snake Range of White Pine County, in the U.S. state of Nevada. Located approximately 55 miles (89 km) north of the town of Baker, the Wilderness was designated in 2006 and is administered by the U.S. Bureau of Land Management.

== Vegetation ==
Vegetation in the Wilderness is mostly desert brush and grass at the lower elevations, and a scattering of pinyon and juniper stands on the slopes of Government Peak and surrounding hills. Bare rock cliffs characterize the eastern side of the Wilderness.

== Recreation ==
Popular recreational activities in Government Peak Wilderness include camping, hiking, backpacking, horseback riding, and hunting. The area provides opportunities for solitude in George Wash, south of Government Peak, and in the higher juniper covered areas.

== See also ==
- List of wilderness areas in Nevada
- List of U.S. Wilderness Areas
- Wilderness Act
