= South Egan Range Wilderness =

Wilderness area in Nevada, United States

- IUCN category Ib (wilderness area)
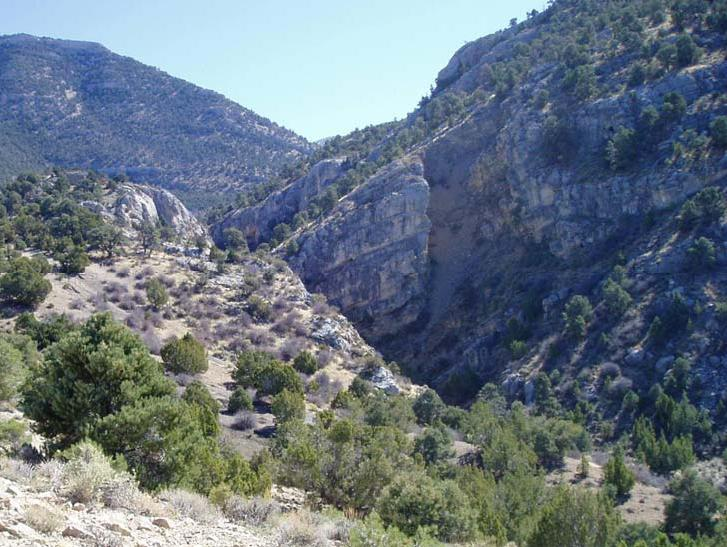

- Location within the United States
- Location: Lincoln / White Pine / Nye counties, Nevada, United States
- Nearest city: Lund, Nevada
- Coordinates: 38°40′59″N 114°56′28″W
- Area: 67,214 acres (27,201 ha)
- Established: December 20, 2006
- Governing body: U.S. Bureau of Land Management

South Egan Range Wilderness is a 67,214-acre (27,201 ha) wilderness area in Lincoln, White Pine, and Nye Counties in the U.S. state of Nevada. Located in the Egan Range approximately two miles east of the town of Lund, the Wilderness was created by the "White Pine County Conservation, Recreation and Development Act of 2006" and is administered by the U.S. Bureau of Land Management.

The South Egan Range Wilderness protects the rugged, bristlecone pine-studded mountain spine running nearly the entire length of the White River Valley. The Wilderness is approximately 40 km (25 miles) from north to south with a maximum width of 11 km (6.8 miles). Elevations range from about 1,670 m (5,480 ft) in the southwestern part of the Wilderness to 2,880 m (9,450 ft) at Sawmill Mountain in the north.

In the southern third of the Wilderness, Long Valley forms an open bowl between high mountain ridges. Rolling hills of pinyon and juniper forests and deep canyons of riparian vegetation round out the ecological and scenic diversity. Angel Cave, a mostly-unexplored, limestone pit cave, lies within the Wilderness at an elevation of approximately 9,000 feet (2,700 m).

== Wildlife ==
The South Egan Range Wilderness provides important nesting habitat for golden eagles, kestrels, hawks, great horned owls, long-eared owls, turkey vultures, and hosts a large population of prairie falcons. Mule deer, elk, and a variety of upland game birds also live in the area.

== See also ==
- List of wilderness areas in Nevada
- List of U.S. Wilderness Areas
- Wilderness Act
