= White Pine Range =

Mountain range in Nevada, United States

Coordinates: 38°54′45″N 115°23′35″W

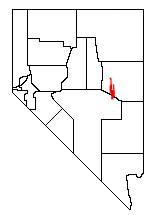
Location of the White Pine Range within Nevada

The White Pine Range is a group of mountains in southern White Pine County, in eastern Nevada. The range runs for approximately 51 miles (82 km) from Beck Pass in the north to Currant Pass in the south. To the west of the range are the Duckwater (Shoshone) tribal lands and the northern arm of large Railroad Valley. To the east are Jakes Valley and the northern part of the long White River Valley. To the south are the Horse and Grant Ranges.

The White Pine Range is a unit of the larger Humboldt–Toiyabe National Forest administered by the US Department of Agriculture's Forest Service.

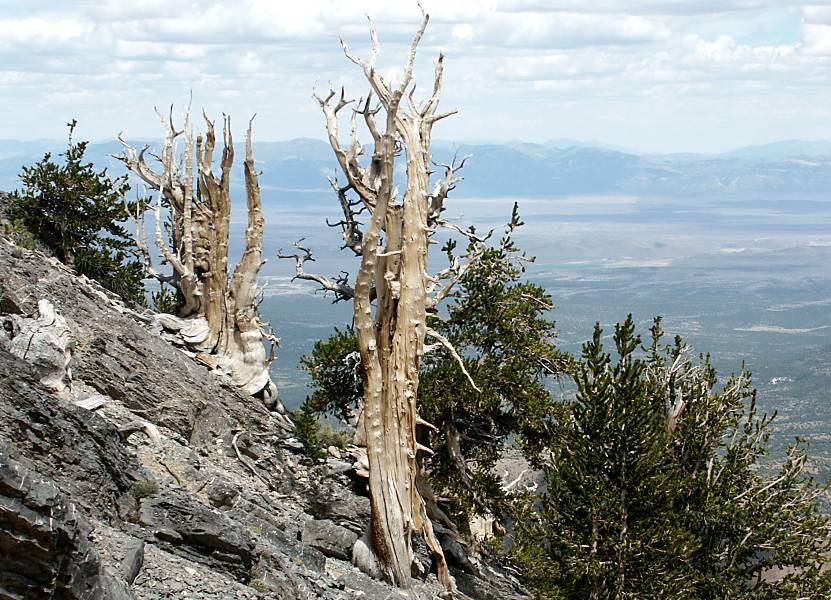
Ancient Bristlecone Pines below Currant Mountain

U.S. Route 50, the "Loneliest Road in America", crosses the range near its northern end at Little Antelope Summit (7,433 ft; 2,266 m). At the southern edge of the range U.S. Route 6 crosses at Currant Summit (6,999 ft; 2,133 m). The southern edge of the range extends into northeastern Nye County.

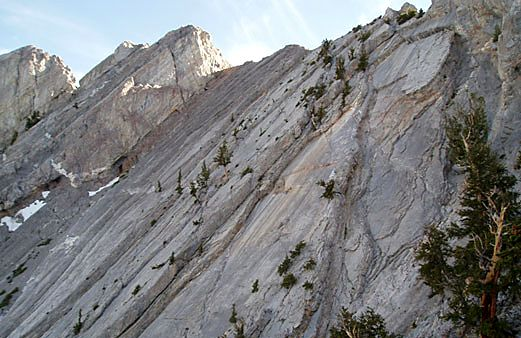
The summit crest at Currant Mountain (NFS)

The historic mining area of Hamilton lies just south of Highway 50 and includes Mt. Hamilton (10,745 ft; 3,275 m). The southern portion of the range rises to a thin limestone ridge, including Currant Mountain (11,513 ft; 3,509 m), the high point of the range. Nearby are Duckwater Peak (11,188 ft; 3,410 m) and White Pine Peak (10,182 ft; 3,103 m). This high section of the range is protected as the Currant Mountain Wilderness Area, and its eastern slopes serve as headwaters to the White River. The 40,013-acre (161.9 km^{2}) White Pine Range Wilderness Area borders the Currant Mountain Wilderness on the south.

Although named after the Limber Pine, the range might better be known for its large and vigorous stand of Great Basin Bristlecone Pines. Young and old trees alike exist at elevations above 10,000 feet, right up to the summit of Currant Mountain.

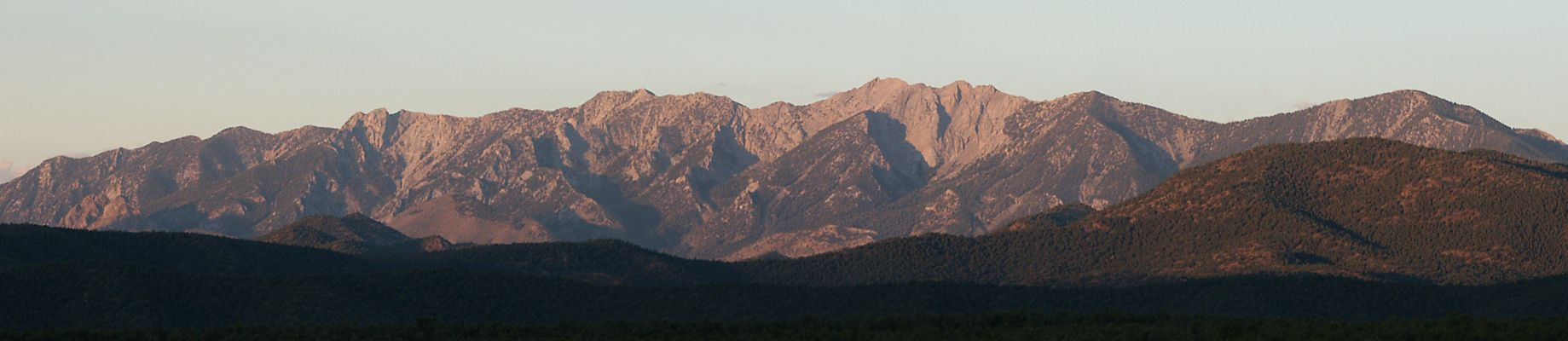
The southern White Pine Range, looking west at sunrise
