= White Pine Range Wilderness =

Wilderness area in Nevada, United States

- IUCN category Ib (wilderness area)
- Location within the United States
- Location: White Pine County, Nevada, United States
- Nearest city: Sunnyside, Nevada
- Coordinates: 39.0816987913°N 115.484585952°W
- Area: 40,013 acres (16,193 ha)
- Established: December 20, 2006
- Governing body: U.S. Forest Service

The White Pine Range Wilderness is a 40,013-acre (16,193 ha) wilderness area in southwestern White Pine County, in the U.S. state of Nevada.

== Geography ==
The Wilderness lies within the Humboldt-Toiyabe National Forest and is therefore administered by the U.S. Forest Service.

Bordered by Currant Mountain Wilderness on the south, the White Pine Range Wilderness was created by the White Pine County Conservation, Recreation and Development Act of 2006. The nearest city is Ely, Nevada.

== Habitats ==
The White Pine Range Wilderness is characterized by rocky canyons and forested alpine hills covered with Abies concolor - white fir, Pinus monophylla - Single-leaf Pinyon, Pinus flexilis - Limber pine, and Pinus longaeva - Great Basin Bristlecone Pines.

== See also ==
- Category:Flora of the Great Basin
- Category:Trees of the Great Basin
- List of wilderness areas in Nevada
- List of U.S. Wilderness Areas
- Wilderness Act
