= White Pine County, Nevada =

County in Nevada, United States

- County
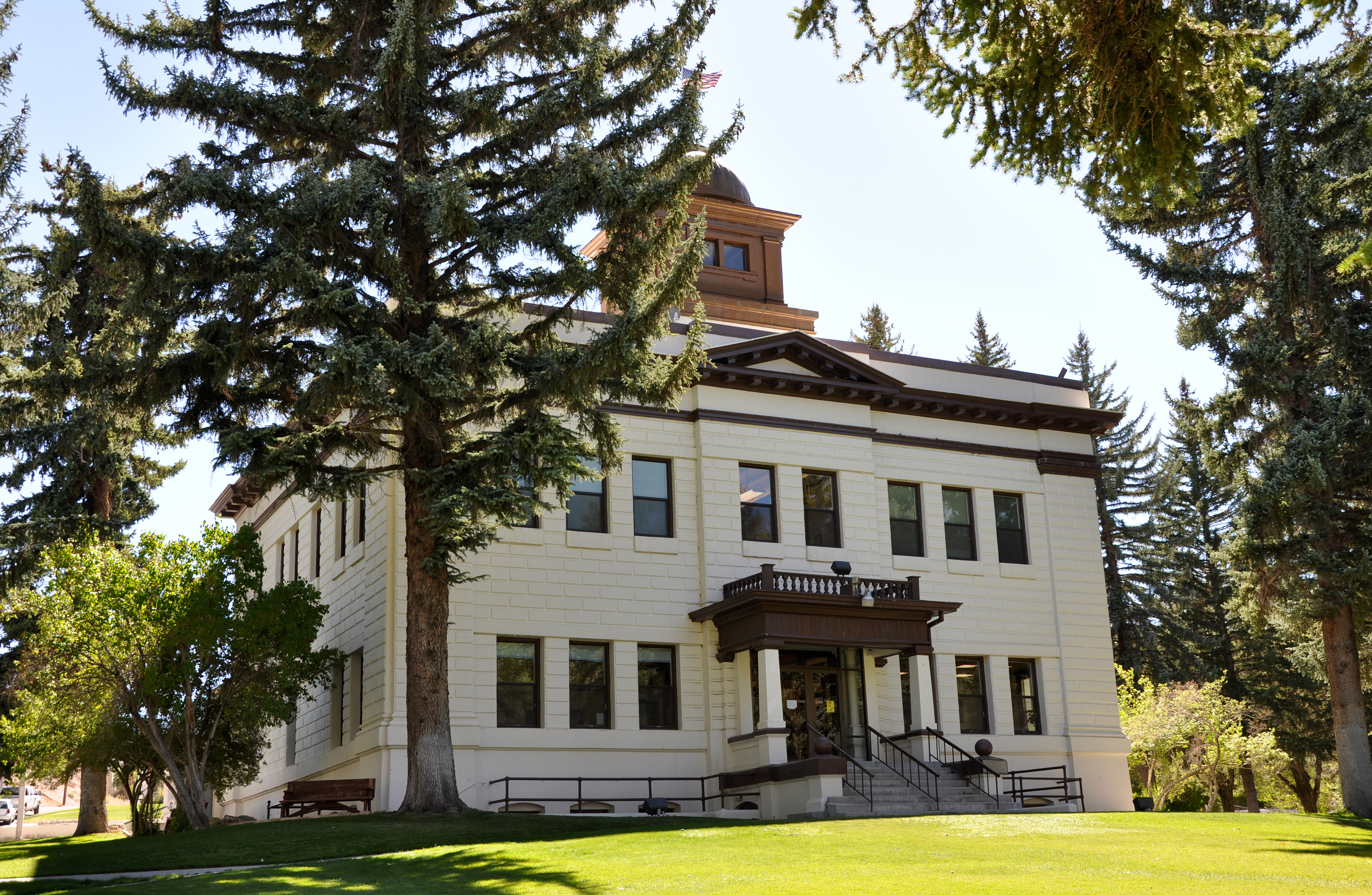
- White Pine County Courthouse in Ely

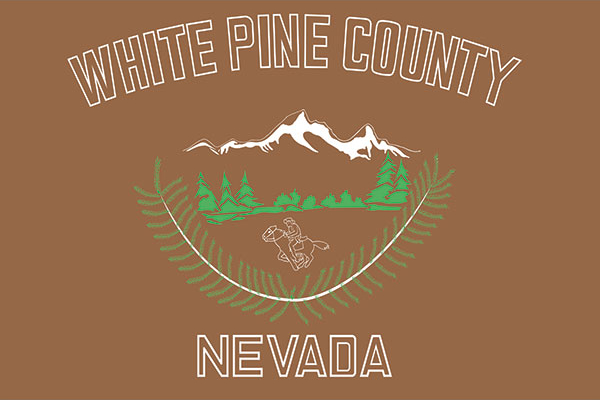
- Flag Logo

- Location within the U.S. state of Nevada
- Coordinates: 39°26′N 114°54′W
- Country: United States
- State: Nevada
- Founded: 1869; 157 years ago
- Named for: Rocky Mountain white pine
- Seat: Ely
- Largest city: Ely

Area
  - Total: 8,897 sq mi (23,040 km^{2})
  - Land: 8,876 sq mi (22,990 km^{2})
  - Water: 21 sq mi (54 km^{2}) 0.2%

Population (2020)
  - Total: 9,080
  - Estimate (2025): 8,661 ▼
  - Density: 1.02/sq mi (0.395/km^{2})
- Time zone: UTC−8 (Pacific)
  - Summer (DST): UTC−7 (PDT)
- Congressional district: 2nd
- Website: whitepinecounty.net

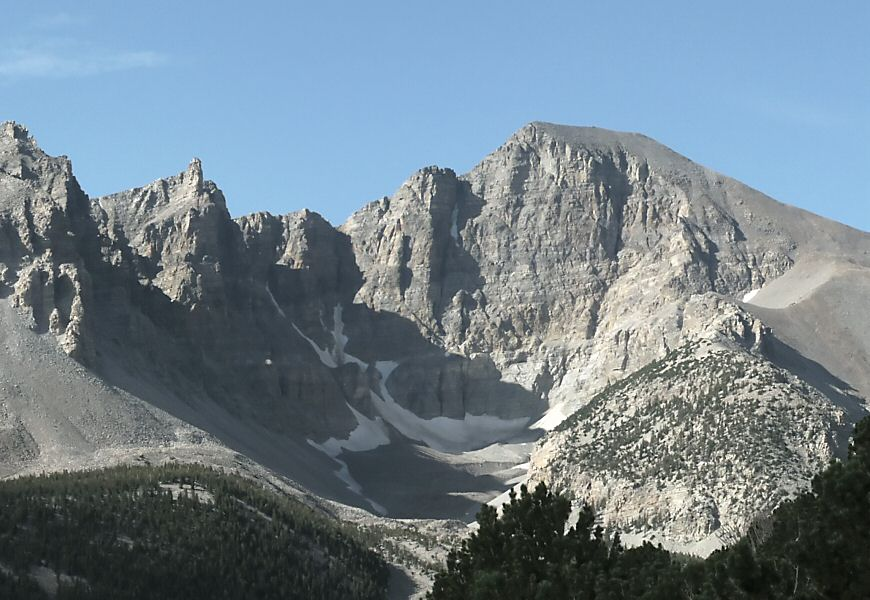
Wheeler Peak, elevation 13,065 feet (3,982 m), in Great Basin National Park.

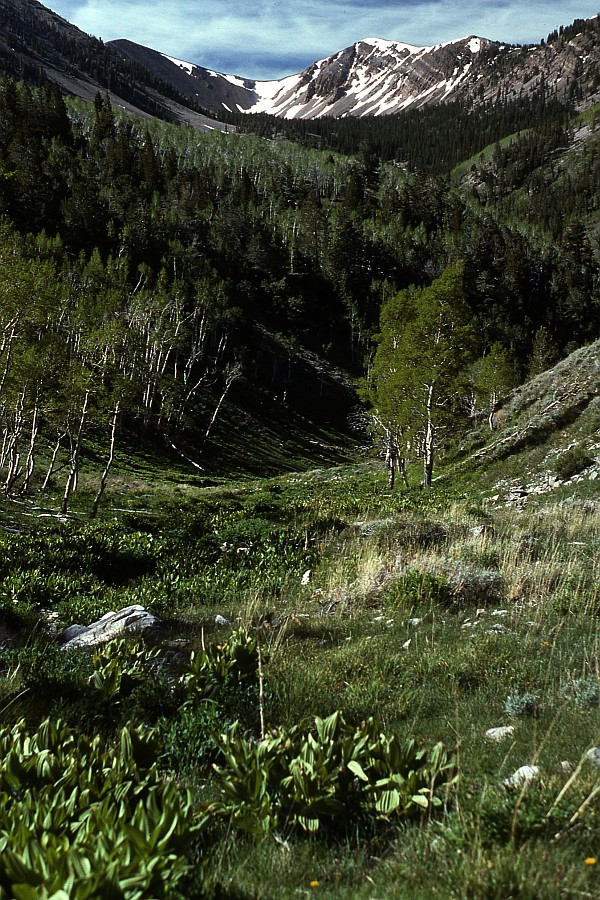
Timber Creek in the Schell Creek Range

White Pine County is a largely rural, mountain county along the central eastern boundary of the U.S. state of Nevada. As of the 2020 census, the population was 9,080. Its county seat is Ely. The name "(Rocky Mountain) white pine" is an old name for the limber pine (Pinus flexilis), a common tree in the county's mountains. The county boasts dark skies, clean air and millions of acres of unspoiled public land. It is the home of Great Basin National Park, one of America's most remote and least visited national parks. It is also home to no less than 14 federally designated wilderness areas, offering an abundance of terrain available to explore for hikers, backpackers, skiers, hunters and anglers. The Ely Shoshone Indian Reservation is located in the county, on the south side of the City of Ely. The reservation has a land area of 104.99 acres (0.4249 km^{2}) and a 2000 census official resident population of 133 people.

== History ==
European settlement in White Pine County began with mining exploration, activity generated by the Pony Express Trail (which passes through the county), and farming.

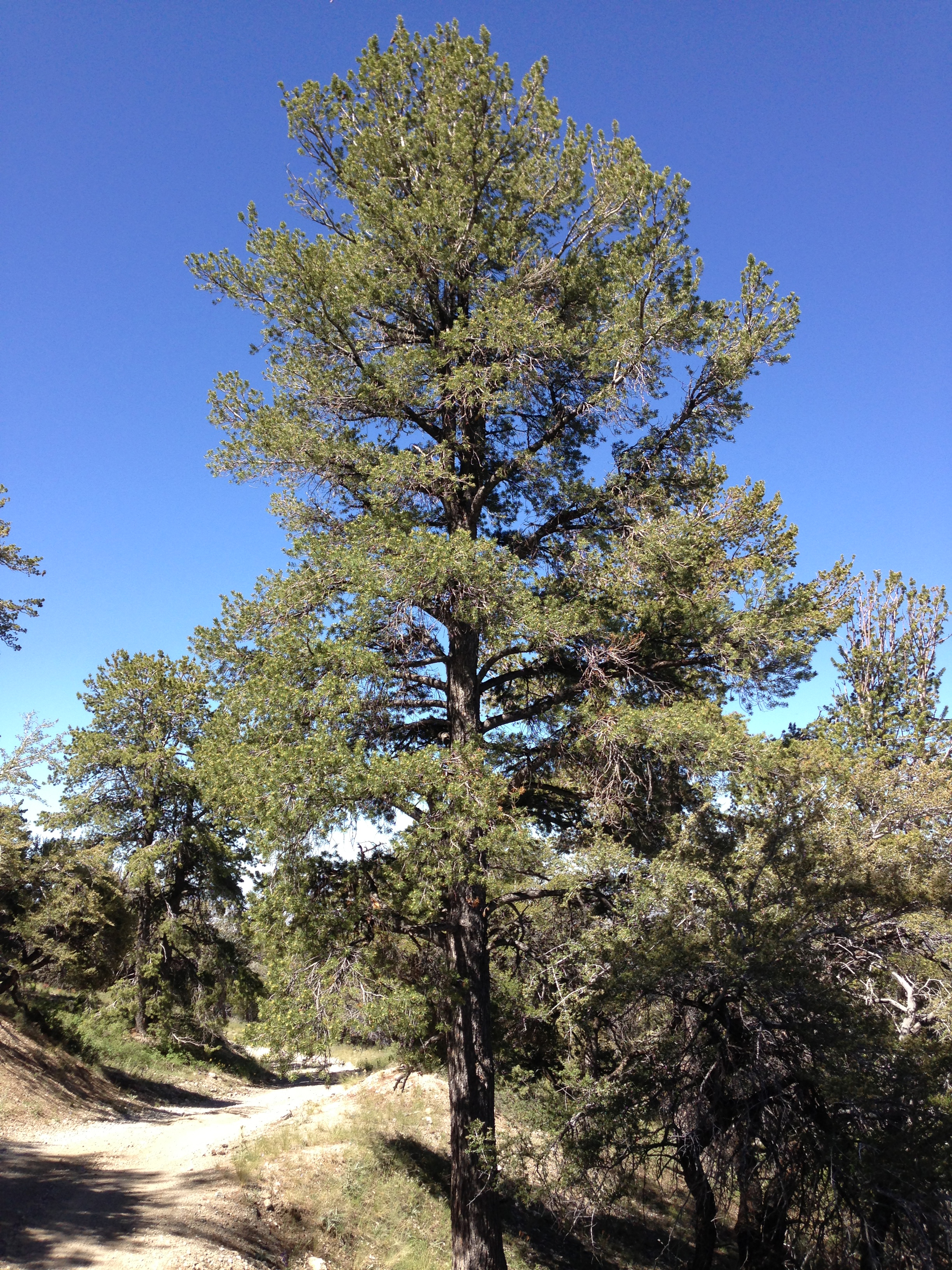
A limber (white) pine tree in Nevada

The county was established by the Nevada legislature in 1869 from Lander County and named after the heavy growth of limber pine trees in the area, which were then called white pine. Hamilton was the first county seat from 1869 to 1887, when it was replaced by Ely after a fire.

== Geography ==
According to the U.S. Census Bureau, the county has a total area of 8,897 square miles (23,040 km^{2}), of which 8,876 square miles (22,990 km^{2}) is land and 21 square miles (54 km^{2}) (0.2%) is water.

Several sections of the Humboldt-Toiyabe National Forest exist within the county, within the Snake Range, Egan Range, White Pine Range, Ruby Mountains, and Schell Creek Range. The county also contains Ward Charcoal Ovens State Historic Park and Cave Lake State Park.

In the southeastern part of the county within Great Basin National Park lies 13,065 ft (3,982 m) Wheeler Peak, the tallest independent mountain within Nevada and the second-highest point within the state (the highest point being Boundary Peak). It is also the most topographically prominent peak in the county and the second-most prominent peak in Nevada (after Mount Charleston).

=== Major highways ===
- U.S. Route 6
- U.S. Route 50
- U.S. Route 93
- U.S. Route 93 Alternate
- State Route 318
- State Route 487
- State Route 488
- State Route 490
- State Route 892
- State Route 893
- State Route 894
- State Route 895

=== Wilderness ===
White Pine County is home to a number of designated wilderness areas. They were created by Congress on December 20, 2006, by the "White Pine County Conservation, Recreation, and Development Act of 2006." About half are integral parts of Humboldt National Forest. The rest are managed by the Bureau of Land Management. One is shared between the two agencies. Some extend into neighboring counties, as indicated.

- Bald Mountain Wilderness (Humboldt NF)
- Becky Peak Wilderness (BLM)
- Bristlecone Wilderness (BLM)
- Currant Mountain Wilderness (Humboldt NF) partly in Nye County, NV
- Goshute Canyon Wilderness (BLM)
- Government Peak Wilderness (BLM)
- High Schells Wilderness (Humboldt NF)
- Highland Ridge Wilderness (BLM)
- Mount Grafton Wilderness (BLM) partly in Lincoln County, NV
- Mount Moriah Wilderness (Humboldt NF / BLM)
- Red Mountain Wilderness (Humboldt NF) partly in Nye County, NV
- Shellback Wilderness (Humboldt NF)
- South Egan Range Wilderness (BLM) partly in Lincoln County, NV; Nye County, NV
- White Pine Range Wilderness (Humboldt NF)

=== Adjacent counties ===
- Elko County - north
- Tooele County, Utah - northeast/Mountain Time Border
- Juab County, Utah - east/Mountain Time Border
- Millard County, Utah - southeast/Mountain Time Border
- Lincoln County - south
- Nye County - southwest
- Eureka County - west

=== National protected areas ===
- Great Basin National Park
- Humboldt-Toiyabe National Forest (part)
- Ruby Lake National Wildlife Refuge (part)

== Demographics ==
Historical population
Census	Pop.	Note	%±
1870	7,189		—
1880	2,682		−62.7%
1890	1,721		−35.8%
1900	1,961		13.9%
1910	7,441		279.4%
1920	8,935		20.1%
1930	11,771		31.7%
1940	12,377		5.1%
1950	9,424		−23.9%
1960	9,808		4.1%
1970	10,150		3.5%
1980	8,167		−19.5%
1990	9,264		13.4%
2000	9,181		−0.9%
2010	10,030		9.2%
2020	9,080		−9.5%
2025 (est.)	8,661	▼	−4.6%
U.S. Decennial Census; 1790-1960 1900-1990; 1990-2000 2010-2020

White Pine County's population grew rapidly in the early part of the 20th Century in response to mining activity, and has remained relatively stable at around 9,500 residents since about 1950. Although mining has been a major employer throughout the county's history, tourism and services related to outdoor recreation are beginning to account for a larger share of jobs in the region.

=== Racial and ethnic composition ===
White Pine County, Nevada – Racial and ethnic composition Note: the US Census treats Hispanic/Latino as an ethnic category. This table excludes Latinos from the racial categories and assigns them to a separate category. Hispanics/Latinos may be of any race.
Race / Ethnicity (NH = Non-Hispanic)	Pop 1980	Pop 1990	Pop 2000	Pop 2010	Pop 2020	% 1980	% 1990	% 2000	% 2010	% 2020
White alone (NH)	7,104	7,928	7,295	7,652	6,354	86.98%	85.58%	79.46%	76.29%	69.98%
Black or African American alone (NH)	12	178	370	388	438	0.15%	1.92%	4.03%	3.87%	4.82%
Native American or Alaska Native alone (NH)	227	262	274	384	358	2.78%	2.83%	2.98%	3.83%	3.94%
Asian alone (NH)	49	33	71	96	105	0.60%	0.36%	0.77%	0.96%	1.16%
Native Hawaiian or Pacific Islander alone (NH)	x	x	21	9	19	x	x	0.23%	0.09%	0.21%
Other race alone (NH)	11	11	10	6	22	0.13%	0.12%	0.11%	0.06%	0.24%
Mixed race or Multiracial (NH)	x	x	132	169	327	x	x	1.44%	1.68%	3.60%
Hispanic or Latino (any race)	764	852	1,008	1,326	1,457	9.35%	9.20%	10.98%	13.22%	16.05%
Total	8,167	9,264	9,181	10,030	9,080	100.00%	100.00%	100.00%	100.00%	100.00%

=== 2020 census ===
As of the 2020 census, the county had a population of 9,080. The median age was 40.1 years. 21.0% of residents were under the age of 18 and 18.5% of residents were 65 years of age or older. For every 100 females there were 134.1 males, and for every 100 females age 18 and over there were 142.9 males age 18 and over.

49.1% of residents lived in urban areas, while 50.9% lived in rural areas.

The racial makeup of the county was 74.3% White, 4.9% Black or African American, 4.4% American Indian and Alaska Native, 1.2% Asian, 0.3% Native Hawaiian and Pacific Islander, 6.6% from some other race, and 8.4% from two or more races. Hispanic or Latino residents of any race comprised 16.0% of the population.

There were 3,351 households in the county, of which 29.1% had children under the age of 18 living with them and 22.6% had a female householder with no spouse or partner present. About 30.7% of all households were made up of individuals and 14.2% had someone living alone who was 65 years of age or older.

There were 4,137 housing units, of which 19.0% were vacant. Among occupied housing units, 72.4% were owner-occupied and 27.6% were renter-occupied. The homeowner vacancy rate was 2.5% and the rental vacancy rate was 15.5%.

=== 2010 census ===
As of the 2010 United States census, there were 10,030 people, 3,707 households, and 2,344 families living in the county. The population density was 1.1 inhabitants per square mile (0.42/km^{2}). There were 4,498 housing units at an average density of 0.5 per square mile (0.19/km^{2}). The racial makeup of the county was 85.5% white, 4.2% American Indian, 3.9% black or African American, 1.0% Asian, 0.1% Pacific islander, 2.8% from other races, and 2.5% from two or more races. Those of Hispanic or Latino origin made up 13.2% of the population. In terms of ancestry, 26.9% were American, 11.3% were English, 11.2% were German, 10.4% were Irish, and 5.6% were Italian.

Of the 3,707 households, 28.6% had children under the age of 18 living with them, 48.2% were married couples living together, 8.8% had a female householder with no husband present, 36.8% were non-families, and 30.2% of all households were made up of individuals. The average household size was 2.37 and the average family size was 2.94. The median age was 40.8 years.

The median income for a household in the county was $48,545 and the median income for a family was $62,946. Males had a median income of $51,010 versus $31,453 for females. The per capita income for the county was $21,615. About 11.7% of families and 15.5% of the population were below the poverty line, including 22.6% of those under age 18 and 8.6% of those age 65 or over.

=== 2000 census ===
As of the census of 2000, there were 9,181 people, 3,282 households, and 2,159 families living in the county. The population density was 1.0 people per square mile (0.39 people/km^{2}). There were 4,439 housing units at an average density of 0.50 per square mile (0.19/km^{2}). The racial makeup of the county was 86.35% White, 4.14% Black or African American, 3.29% Native American, 0.78% Asian, 0.24% Pacific Islander, 3.09% from other races, and 2.10% from two or more races. 10.98% of the population were Hispanic or Latino of any race.

There were 3,282 households, out of which 31.20% had children under the age of 18 living with them, 51.80% were married couples living together, 9.3% had a female householder with no husband present, and 34.2% were non-families. 29.6% of all households were made up of individuals, and 11.5% had someone living alone who was 65 years of age or older. The average household size was 2.42 and the average family size was 3.01.

In the county, the population was spread out, with 24.2% under the age of 18, 7.6% from 18 to 24, 29.9% from 25 to 44, 24.8% from 45 to 64, and 13.5% who were 65 years of age or older. The median age was 38 years. For every 100 females there were 128.6 males. For every 100 females age 18 and over, there were 138.5 males.

The median income for a household in the county was $36,688, and the median income for a family was $44,136. Males had a median income of $36,083 versus $26,425 for females. The per capita income for the county was $18,309. About 10.3% of families and 11.0% of the population were below the poverty line, including 11.8% of those under age 18 and 7.6% of those age 65 or over.

== Economy ==
From the late 19th century until near the end of the 20th century, the major industry was mining the region's deposits of copper, silver, and gold. The most notable of these operations included a series of open-pit copper mines near the town of Ruth, and a copper smelter in McGill, run by the Kennecott Utah Copper Corporation. The decline of mining has meant the loss of area jobs.

== Education ==
The entire county is served by the White Pine County School District.

== Communities ==
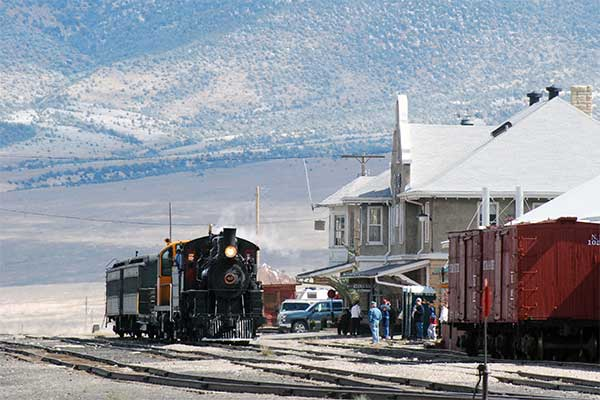
Steam excursion train at the Nevada Northern Railway Museum's East Ely depot

=== City ===
- Ely (county seat)

=== Census-designated places ===
- Baker
- Lund
- McGill
- Preston
- Ruth

=== Unincorporated communities ===
- Cherry Creek
- East Ely
- Lages Station
- Majors Place
- Riepetown
- Schellbourne
- Strawberry

=== Ghost towns ===
- Aurum
- Eightmile
- Hamilton
- Hobson
- Kimberly
- Lages Station
- Lane City
- Osceola
- Pleasant Valley
- Regan
- Strawberry
- Treasure City
- Tungstonia
- Veteran
- Ward

== Government and infrastructure ==
Regional offices of the U.S. Bureau of Land Management and the U.S. Forest Service are located in Ely.

Ely State Prison, the location of Nevada's death row for men and the state execution chamber, is located in the county.

=== Politics ===
A swing county for much of the 20th century, White Pine County has become powerfully Republican like the rest of rural Nevada since the 1980s. The last Democrat to carry a majority in the county was Jimmy Carter in 1976. The most recent Democratic win in the county was a 36% plurality by Bill Clinton in 1992; Clinton went on to lose the county in 1996 by just 2 votes. Donald Trump received over 70% of the county's vote in 2016, 2020, and 2024. The city of Ely and almost all rural areas of the county reflect the county's overall Republican leaning. The rural district in the southeast part of the county near the Utah border, encompassing Baker and Great Basin National Park, has a slight Democratic leaning, though there are only 118 voters in the area and the Democratic majority only consisted of 4 votes in 2024.

United States presidential election results for White Pine County, Nevada
Year	Republican		Democratic		Third party(ies)	
Year	No.	%	No.	%	No.	%
1904	276	59.35%	152	32.69%	37	7.96%
1908	786	47.84%	722	43.94%	135	8.22%
1912	254	16.92%	514	34.24%	733	48.83%
1916	948	30.31%	1,922	61.45%	258	8.25%
1920	1,354	55.58%	902	37.03%	180	7.39%
1924	1,049	44.52%	499	21.18%	808	34.30%
1928	1,992	58.50%	1,413	41.50%	0	0.00%
1932	1,352	38.30%	2,178	61.70%	0	0.00%
1936	872	23.71%	2,806	76.29%	0	0.00%
1940	1,568	29.93%	3,671	70.07%	0	0.00%
1944	1,554	35.59%	2,812	64.41%	0	0.00%
1948	1,396	36.33%	2,287	59.51%	160	4.16%
1952	2,205	50.25%	2,183	49.75%	0	0.00%
1956	2,386	51.50%	2,247	48.50%	0	0.00%
1960	1,552	36.39%	2,713	63.61%	0	0.00%
1964	1,174	29.48%	2,809	70.52%	0	0.00%
1968	1,670	40.65%	2,062	50.19%	376	9.15%
1972	2,446	61.27%	1,546	38.73%	0	0.00%
1976	1,543	41.27%	2,009	53.73%	187	5.00%
1980	1,896	54.77%	1,181	34.11%	385	11.12%
1984	1,917	57.90%	1,276	38.54%	118	3.56%
1988	1,774	53.31%	1,351	40.59%	203	6.10%
1992	1,206	32.33%	1,354	36.30%	1,170	31.37%
1996	1,399	40.03%	1,397	39.97%	699	20.00%
2000	2,234	63.05%	1,069	30.17%	240	6.77%
2004	2,604	68.49%	1,082	28.46%	116	3.05%
2008	2,440	63.51%	1,230	32.01%	172	4.48%
2012	2,601	70.22%	983	26.54%	120	3.24%
2016	2,723	72.17%	707	18.74%	343	9.09%
2020	3,403	77.89%	859	19.66%	107	2.45%
2024	3,364	77.32%	883	20.29%	104	2.39%

United States Senate election results for White Pine County, Nevada1
Year	Republican		Democratic		Third party(ies)	
Year	No.	%	No.	%	No.	%
2024	3,160	72.91%	846	19.52%	328	7.57%

== See also ==
- National Register of Historic Places listings in White Pine County, Nevada
