= National Register of Historic Places listings in Great Basin National Park =

This is a list of the National Register of Historic Places listings in Great Basin National Park.

This is intended to be a complete list of the properties and districts on the National Register of Historic Places in Great Basin National Park, Nevada, United States. The locations of National Register properties and districts for which the latitude and longitude coordinates are included below, may be seen in a Google map.

There are five properties and districts listed on the National Register in the park.

This National Park Service list is complete through NPS recent listings posted March 14, 2025.

== Current listings ==
	Name on the Register	Image	Date listed	Location	City or town	Description
1	Baker Ranger Station	Baker Ranger Station	October 17, 1995 (#95001224)	Great Basin National Park; 39°00′53″N 114°07′23″W	Baker	
2	Johnson Lake Mine Historic District	Johnson Lake Mine Historic District	November 2, 1995 (#95001225)	Great Basin National Park; 38°56′32″N 114°17′44″W	Baker	
3	Lehman Orchard and Aqueduct	Lehman Orchard and Aqueduct	February 25, 1975 (#75000181)	Great Basin National Park; 39°00′22″N 114°13′05″W	Baker	
4	Osceola (East) Ditch	Osceola (East) Ditch	June 6, 1996 (#96000584)	Starting 0.5 miles east of Grouse Canyon and running approximately 18 miles southeast to Lehman Creek in Great Basin National Park; 39°01′48″N 114°17′26″W	Baker	
5	Rhodes Cabin	Rhodes Cabin	February 25, 1975 (#75000180)	Great Basin National Park; 39°00′20″N 114°13′09″W	Baker	

== See also ==
- National Register of Historic Places listings in Nevada
