= Stella Lake =

Lake in Nevada, United States

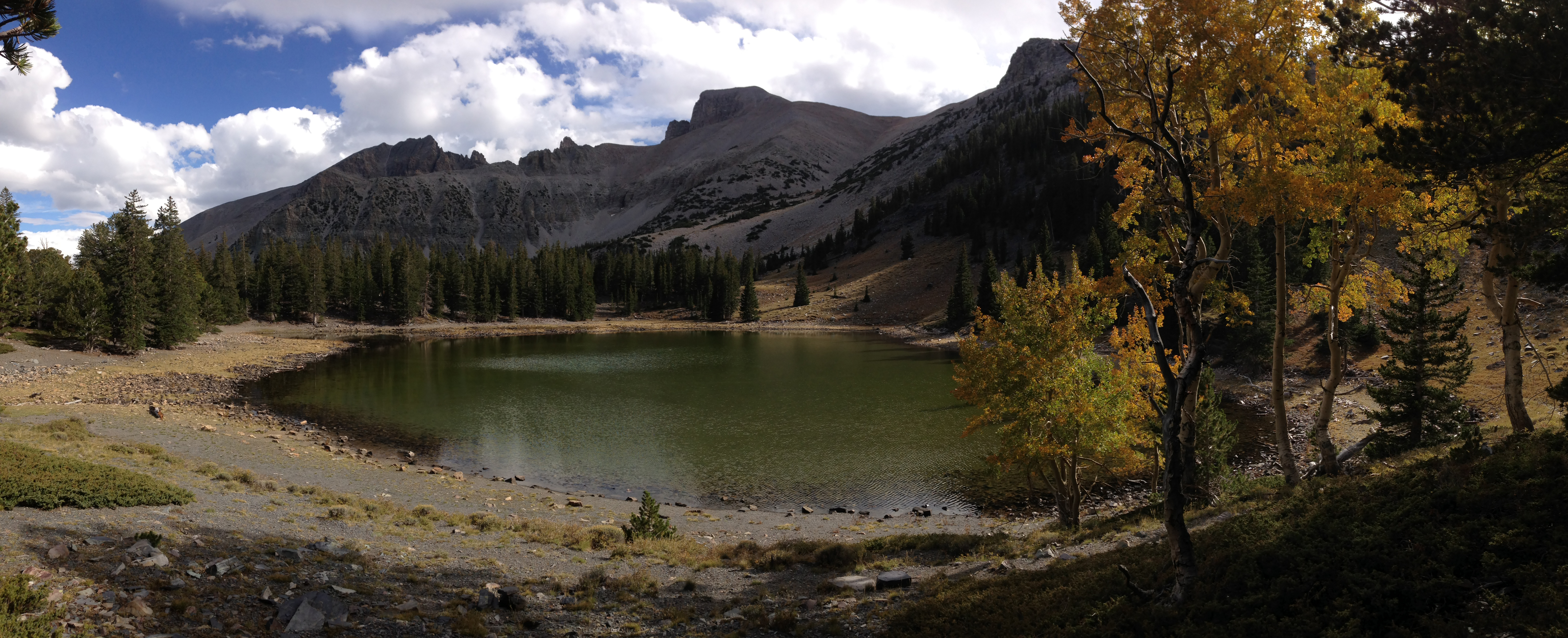
- Panorama of Stella Lake, with Wheeler Peak in the background

- Location in Nevada
- Location: White Pine County, Nevada, United States
- Coordinates: 39°00′19.16″N 114°19′07.17″W
- Type: Tarn
- Primary outflows: Lehman Creek
- Basin countries: United States
- Surface elevation: 10,400 ft (3,200 m)

Stella Lake is a glacial tarn in the Snake Range of White Pine County, Nevada, United States. It is located within Great Basin National Park, just north of Wheeler Peak. It is a prominent feature along the park's Alpine Lakes Loop Trail.

Stella, Teresa, Brown, Baker, Johnson, and Dead lakes are tarns. These glacial lakes are significant to the park's ecosystem and their water quality is monitored on an annual basis.
