= Lincoln Peak (Nevada) =

Mountain in Nevada, United States

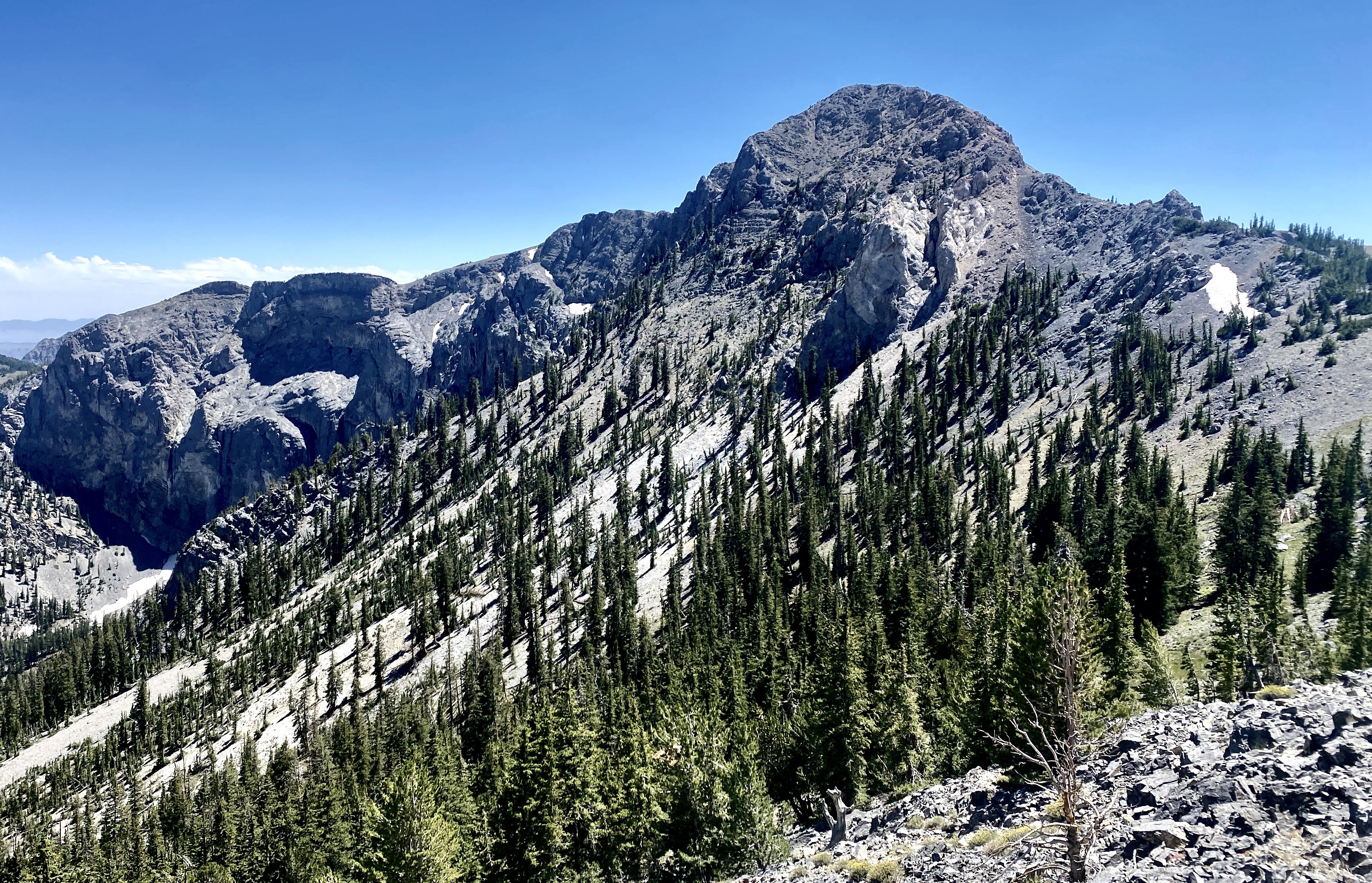
- Northwest aspect

Highest point
- Elevation: 11,597 ft (3,535 m)
- Prominence: 937 ft (286 m)
- Parent peak: Mount Washington
- Isolation: 2.28 mi (3.67 km)
- Coordinates: 38°52′58″N 114°17′50″W

Geography
- Location within Nevada Location within the United States
- Country: United States
- State: Nevada
- County: White Pine
- Protected area: Great Basin National Park
- Parent range: Snake Range; Great Basin Ranges
- Topo map: USGS Wheeler Peak

Geology
- Rock age: Cambrian
- Mountain type: Fault block
- Rock type(s): Limestone, Quartzite, Shale

Climbing
- Easiest route: class 2

Lincoln Peak is an 11,597-foot elevation (3,535 m) mountain summit in White Pine County, Nevada, United States.

== Description ==
Lincoln Peak is part of the Snake Range which is a subrange of the Great Basin Ranges. The peak is located in Great Basin National Park and 6.84 miles (11.01 km) south of Wheeler Peak. It ranks as the seventh-highest peak in the park and 17th-highest in Nevada. Topographic relief is significant as the summit rises 3,600 feet (1,097 meters) above Lincoln Canyon in 1.35 miles (2.17 km) and over 5,600 feet (1,707 meters) above Spring Valley in five miles (8.0 km). The Highland Ridge Trail traverses the west slope of the peak, approximately 600 feet below the summit. This mountain's toponym has been officially adopted by the U.S. Board on Geographic Names. The southern tip of the Snake Range is in Lincoln County, Nevada, which is named for Abraham Lincoln.

== Climate ==
Lincoln Peak is set within the Great Basin Desert which has hot summers and cold winters. The desert is an example of a cold desert climate as the desert's elevation makes temperatures cooler than lower elevation deserts. Due to the high elevation and aridity, temperatures drop sharply after sunset. Summer nights are comfortably cool. Winter highs are generally above freezing, and winter nights are bitterly cold, with temperatures often dropping well below freezing.

== See also ==
- Lincoln Peak Formation
- Great Basin

== Gallery ==
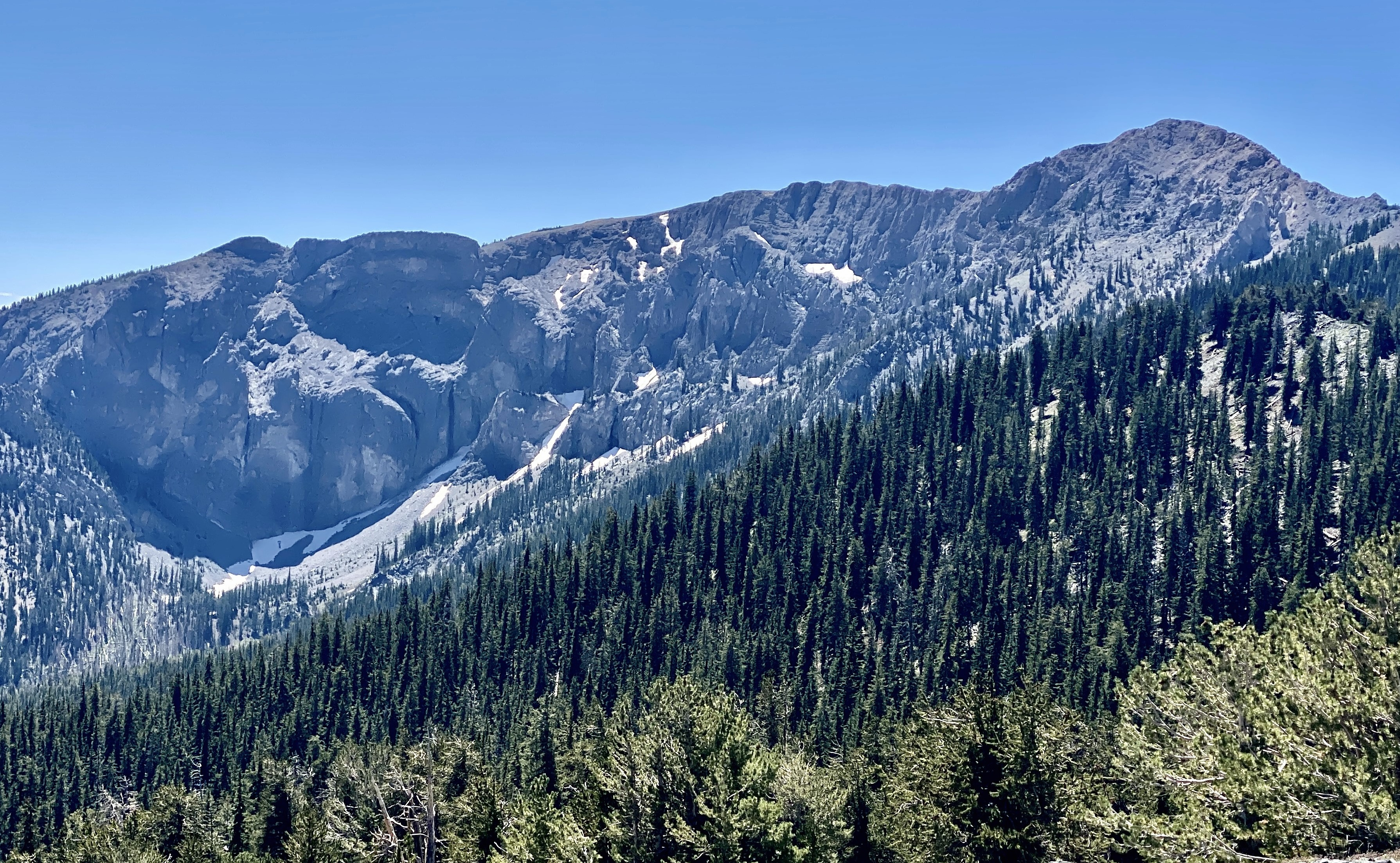
North aspect with summit to the right

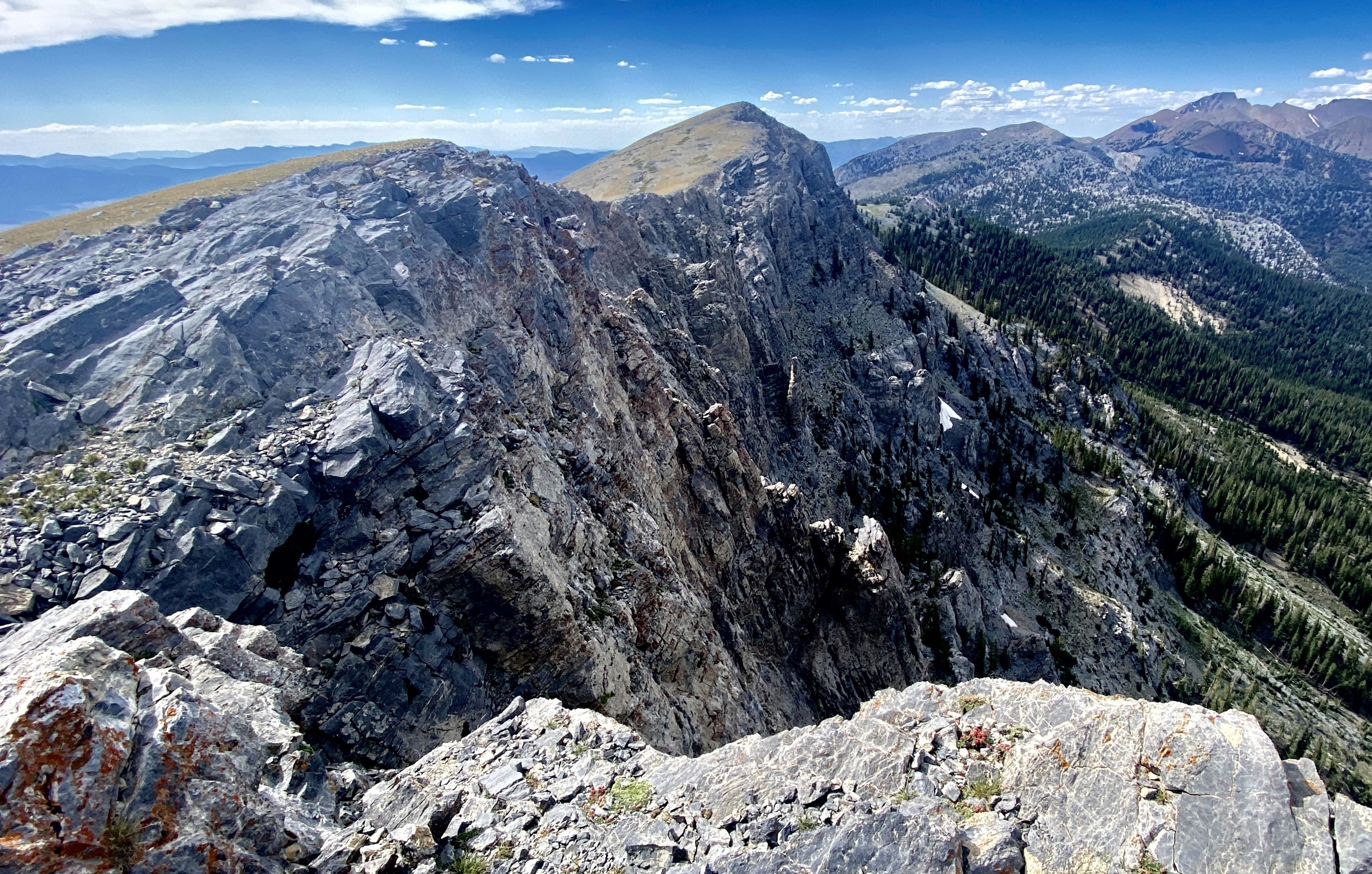
Southeast aspect

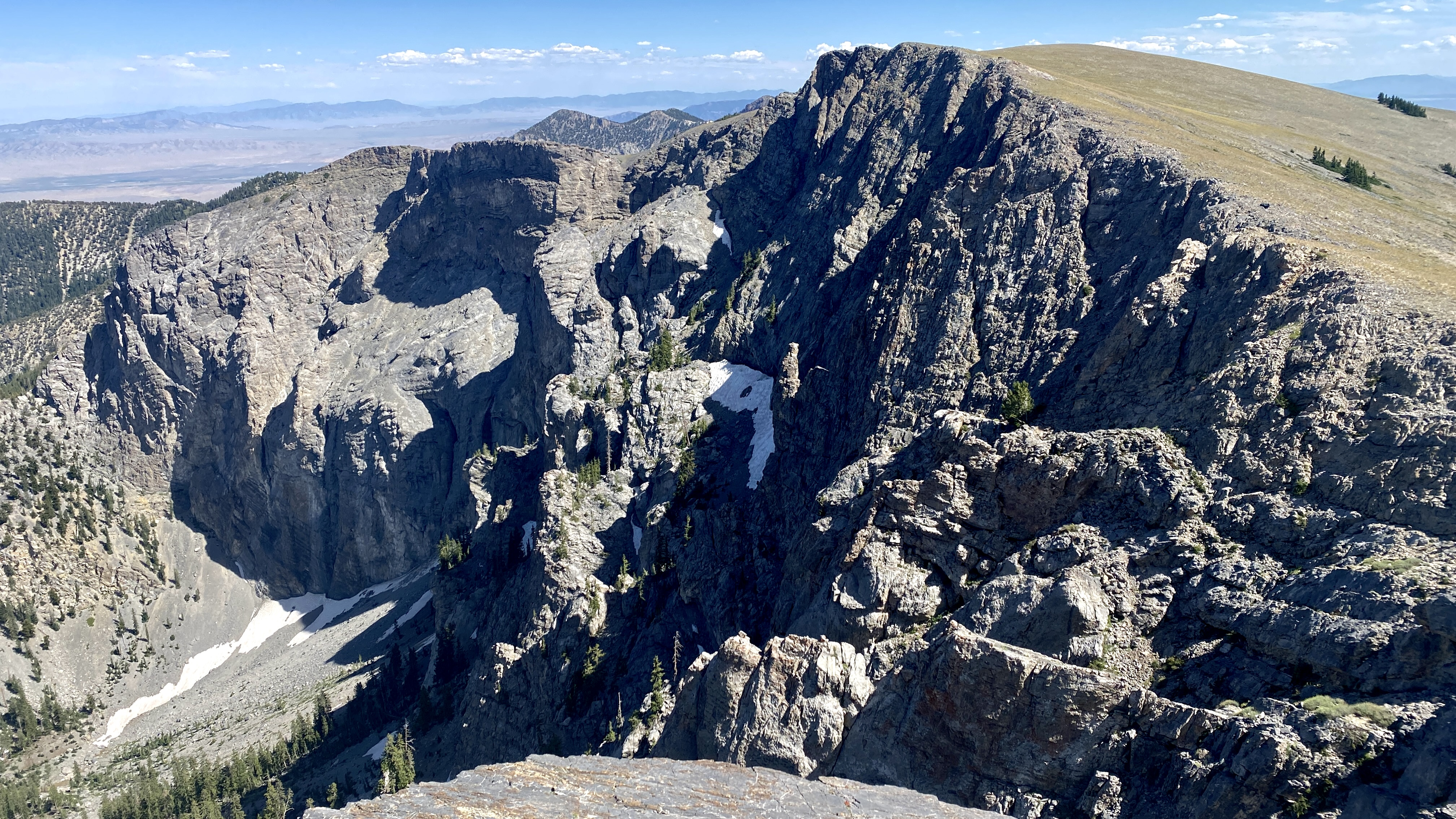
View looking south from summit of Lincoln Peak
