= Teresa Lake =

Lake in Nevada, United States

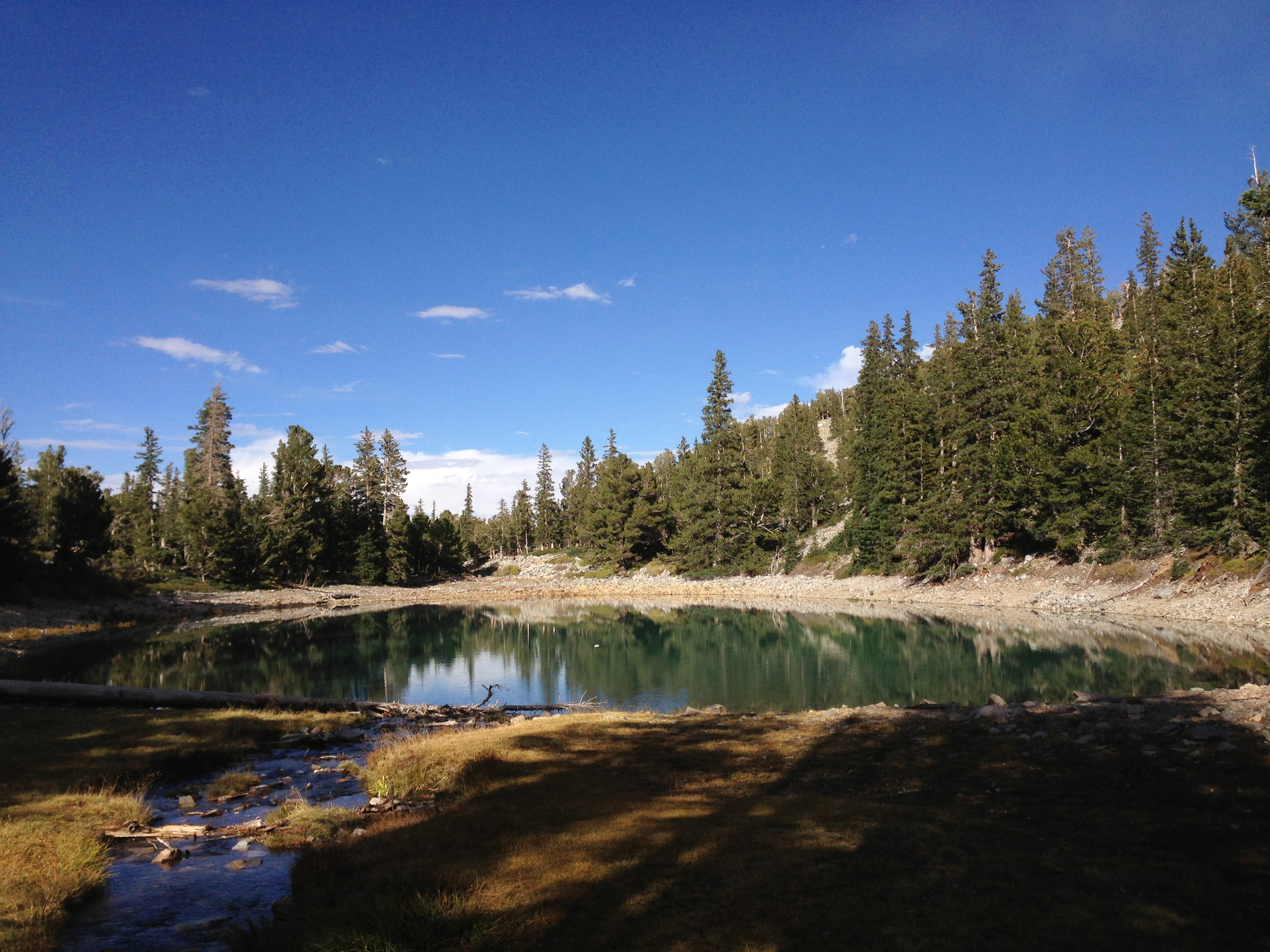
- View of Teresa Lake

- Location in Nevada
- Location: White Pine County, Nevada, United States
- Coordinates: 39°00′11.39″N 114°18′40.13″W
- Type: Tarn
- Primary outflows: Lehman Creek
- Basin countries: United States
- Surface elevation: 10,275 ft (3,132 m)

Teresa Lake is a glacial tarn in the Snake Range of White Pine County, Nevada, United States. It is located within Great Basin National Park, just north of Wheeler Peak. It is a prominent feature along the park's Alpine Lakes Loop Trail.
