= Mount Moriah (Nevada) =

Mountain in the American state of Nevada

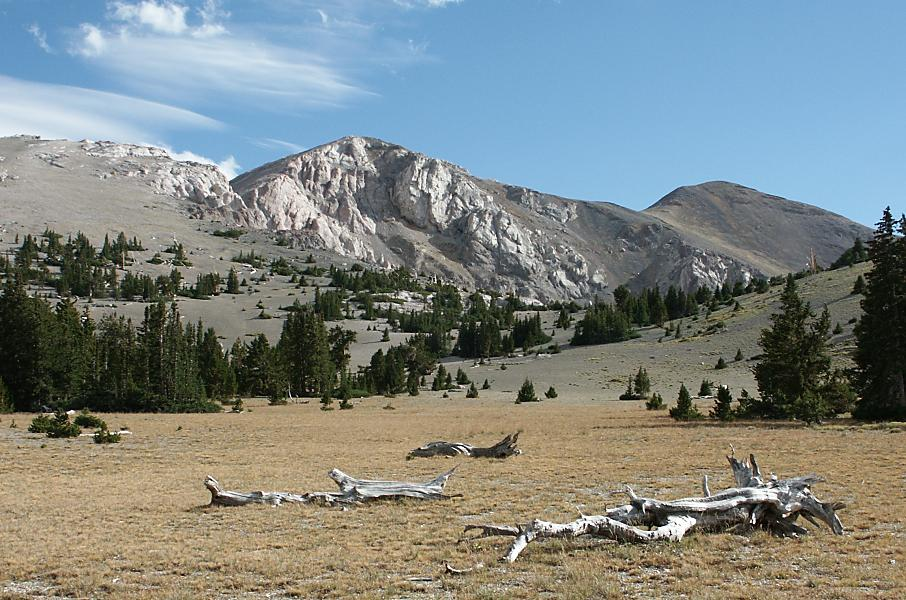
- Mount Moriah, looking southwest from 'The Table,' in the Snake Range.

Highest point
- Elevation: 12,072 ft (3,680 m) NAVD 88
- Prominence: 4,907 ft (1,496 m)
- Listing: Nevada's 5th-highest; Western States Climbers star peak
- Coordinates: 39°16′23″N 114°11′56″W

Geography
- Location within Nevada
- Location: White Pine County, Nevada, U.S.
- Parent range: Snake Range
- Topo map: USGS Mount Moriah

Mount Moriah is a 12,072-foot (3,680 m) mountain in the northern Snake Range of eastern White Pine County, Nevada, United States. It is the fifth-highest mountain in the state, and ranks as the ninth-most topographically prominent peak in the state. It is located in the Mount Moriah Wilderness administered by the Humboldt-Toiyabe National Forest.

== Geography ==
Mount Moriah rises over 6,000 feet (1,800 m) vertical feet above the Snake Valley on its east flank, and the Spring Valley to its west. The summit is the highest point in the Humboldt-Toiyabe National Forest.

Immediately to the north is a large flat sub-alpine area called The Table, which supports an ancient stand of Great Basin Bristlecone Pine (Pinus longaeva).

The mountain is about 37 miles (60 km) east of Ely, the nearest town. U.S. Route 6 and U.S. Route 50 traverse the Sacramento Pass nearby, which divides the northern and southern sections of the Snake Range. To the south of the pass are Great Basin National Park and Wheeler Peak.

=== Climate ===
Climate data for Mount Moriah 39.2745 N, 114.2001 W, Elevation: 11,522 ft (3,512 m) (1991–2020 normals)
Month	Jan	Feb	Mar	Apr	May	Jun	Jul	Aug	Sep	Oct	Nov	Dec	Year
Mean daily maximum °F (°C)	27.0 (−2.8)	26.7 (−2.9)	31.8 (−0.1)	35.8 (2.1)	44.8 (7.1)	56.4 (13.6)	65.2 (18.4)	63.8 (17.7)	55.6 (13.1)	44.2 (6.8)	33.1 (0.6)	26.6 (−3.0)	42.6 (5.9)
Daily mean °F (°C)	18.2 (−7.7)	17.3 (−8.2)	21.4 (−5.9)	25.3 (−3.7)	34.0 (1.1)	44.5 (6.9)	53.1 (11.7)	51.9 (11.1)	44.1 (6.7)	33.8 (1.0)	24.2 (−4.3)	17.9 (−7.8)	32.1 (0.1)
Mean daily minimum °F (°C)	9.3 (−12.6)	7.9 (−13.4)	11.1 (−11.6)	14.7 (−9.6)	23.1 (−4.9)	32.6 (0.3)	41.1 (5.1)	40.1 (4.5)	32.5 (0.3)	23.5 (−4.7)	15.2 (−9.3)	9.2 (−12.7)	21.7 (−5.7)
Average precipitation inches (mm)	3.65 (93)	3.35 (85)	3.94 (100)	4.03 (102)	3.07 (78)	1.32 (34)	1.39 (35)	1.27 (32)	1.79 (45)	2.13 (54)	2.38 (60)	3.27 (83)	31.59 (801)
Source: PRISM Climate Group
