= Pyramid Peak (Nevada) =

Mountain in Nevada, United States

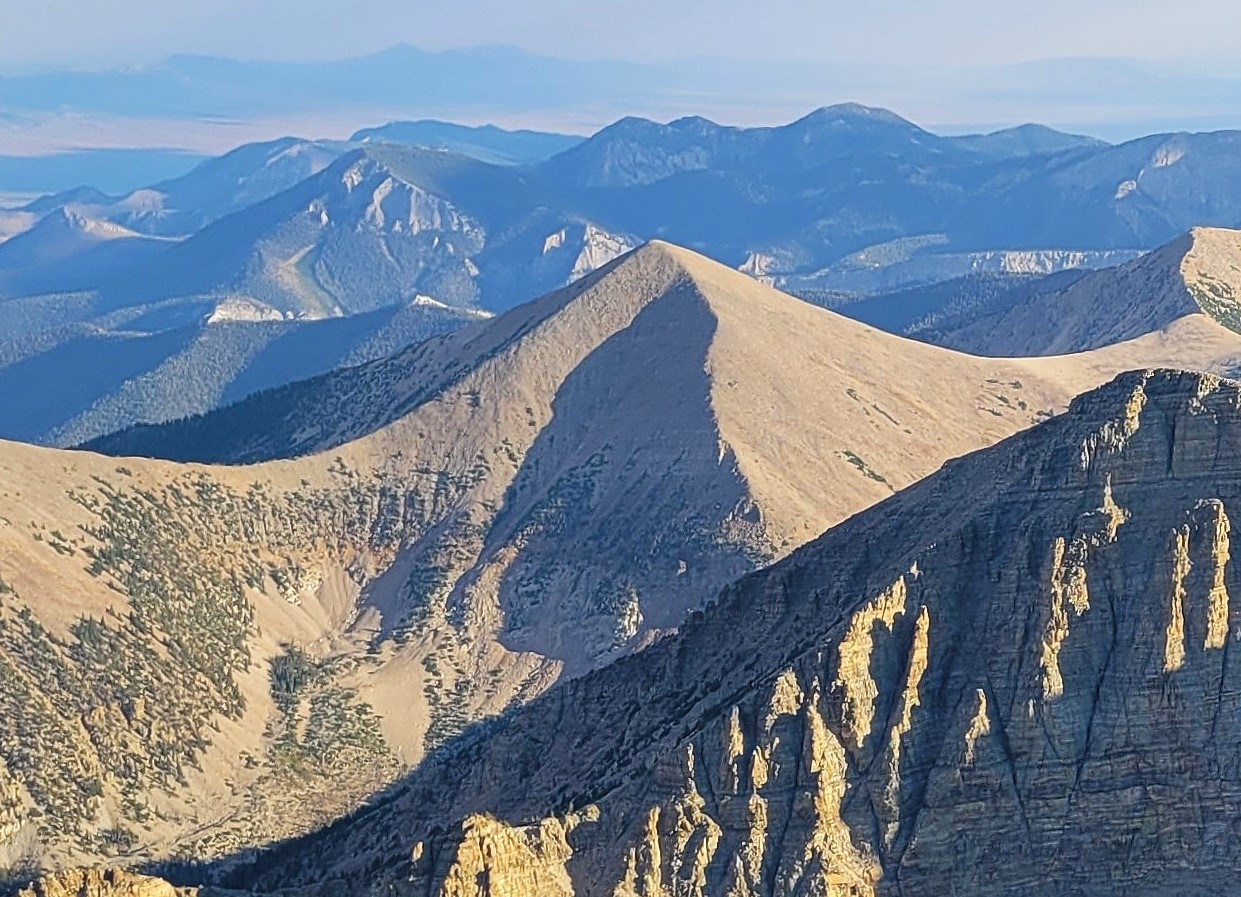
- North aspect, centered

Highest point
- Elevation: 11,920 ft (3,633 m)
- Prominence: 754 ft (230 m)
- Parent peak: Baker Peak
- Isolation: 1.60 mi (2.57 km)
- Coordinates: 38°56′54″N 114°17′43″W

Geography
- Location within Nevada Location within the United States
- Interactive map of Pyramid Peak
- Country: United States
- State: Nevada
- County: White Pine
- Protected area: Great Basin National Park
- Parent range: Snake Range; Great Basin Ranges
- Topo map: USGS Wheeler Peak

Geology
- Rock age: Cambrian
- Rock type(s): Quartzite, Granite

Climbing
- Easiest route: class 2

Pyramid Peak is a mountain in White Pine County, Nevada, United States.

== Description ==
Pyramid Peak is a 11,920-foot-elevation (3,633-meter) summit set in the Snake Range and Great Basin National Park. It ranks as the seventh-highest summit in the state of Nevada. Precipitation runoff from the mountain drains east into Baker and Snake creeks, which both end in the Snake Valley of the Great Basin where it evaporates or sinks underground — i.e., it is endorheic as no water reaches the ocean. Topographic relief is significant as the summit rises 1,900 feet (579 meters) above Baker Creek in one mile (1.6 km). The nearest higher peak is Baker Peak, 1.24 miles (2.00 km) to the northwest. The mountain's toponym has been officially adopted by the United States Board on Geographic Names.

== Climate ==
Pyramid Peak is set within the Great Basin Desert which has hot summers and cold winters. The desert is an example of a cold desert climate as the desert's elevation makes temperatures cooler than lower elevation deserts. Due to the high elevation and aridity, temperatures drop sharply after sunset. Summer nights are comfortably cool. Winter highs are generally above freezing, and winter nights are bitterly cold, with temperatures often dropping well below freezing.

== See also ==
- List of mountain peaks of Nevada
