= Johnson Lake Mine Historic District =

Historic district in Nevada, United States

- U.S. National Register of Historic Places
- U.S. Historic district
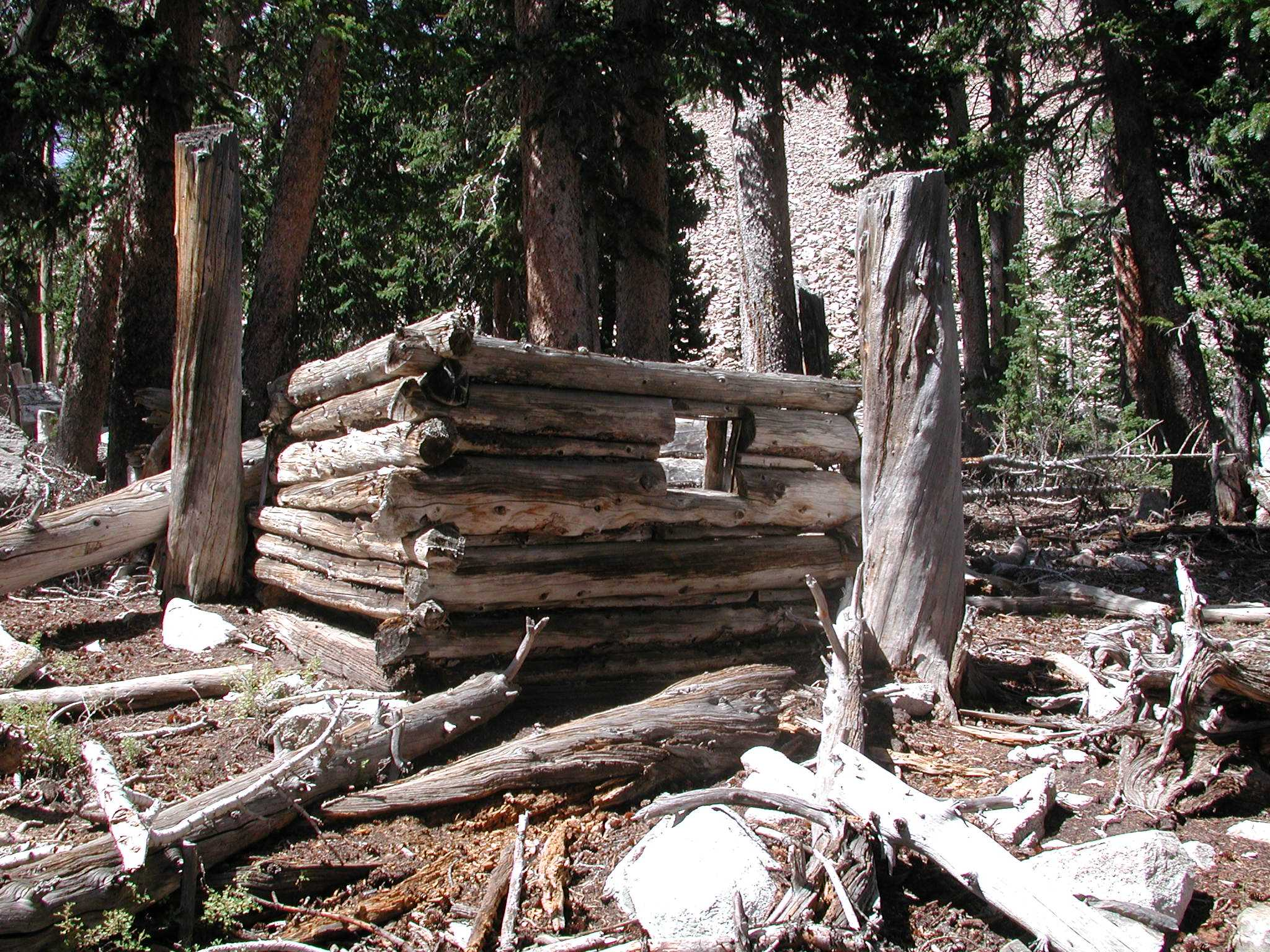
- Cabin No. 4, Johnson Lake Mine

- Location within Nevada Location within the United States
- Location: White Pine County, Nevada
- Nearest city: Baker, Nevada
- Coordinates: 38°56′32″N 114°17′44″W
- NRHP reference No.: 95001225
- Added to NRHP: November 02, 1995

The Johnson Lake Mine is a former tungsten mine located within the boundaries of Great Basin National Park in eastern Nevada. Located on the east slope of the southern Snake Range at an elevation above 10,000 ft (3,000 m), the 100 acres (40 ha) historic district was listed on the National Register of Historic Places in 1995.

== History ==
The lake and mine are named for Alfred Johnson, who filed a mining claim in Snake Creek Canyon in 1909. A rancher who also wished to exploit the location opposed him in court, but Johnson prevailed. Tungsten was discovered in the area in 1912 by John D. Tilford. Tilford set up the Bonita Mine, while Johnson set up the Johnson Lake Mine in 1912. The mine was finally closed when a snowslide destroyed the aerial tram terminal after 1935.

== Description ==
The district includes a mining adit and stope, an aerial tramway, four log structures, a log ore mill, a stable, trash dumps and a dam on Johnson Lake. Three cabins were built for accommodations, three small cabins for sleeping and storage, and a larger communal cabin. There is also evidence of tent platforms. The site is well preserved, with some of the mining equipment intact. The aerial tramway transported ore from the mine 300 m (980 ft) across a steep slope to a terminal building, where the ore was packing in barrels and hauled by mule 1.1 km (0.68 mi) to the mill. The milled ore was then packed 1.8 mi (2.9 km) to the location of the present Shoshone Campground and further transferred 18 mi (29 km) to Garrison, Utah. From Garrison the ore went 75 mi (121 km) to the railroad at Frisco, Utah.

The mine followed an 18 in (460 mm) wide ore-bearing quartz vein about 1,800 ft (550 m) into the mountainside.

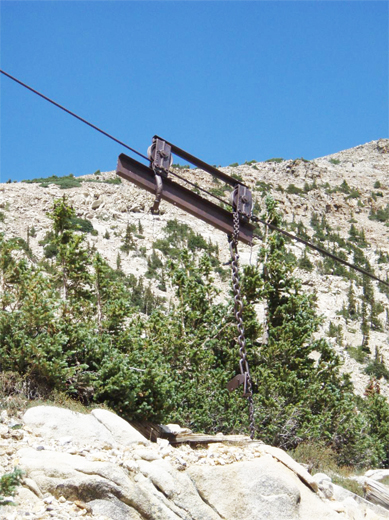
Cable tramway
