= Wheeler Peak Glacier =

Glacier in Nevada, United States

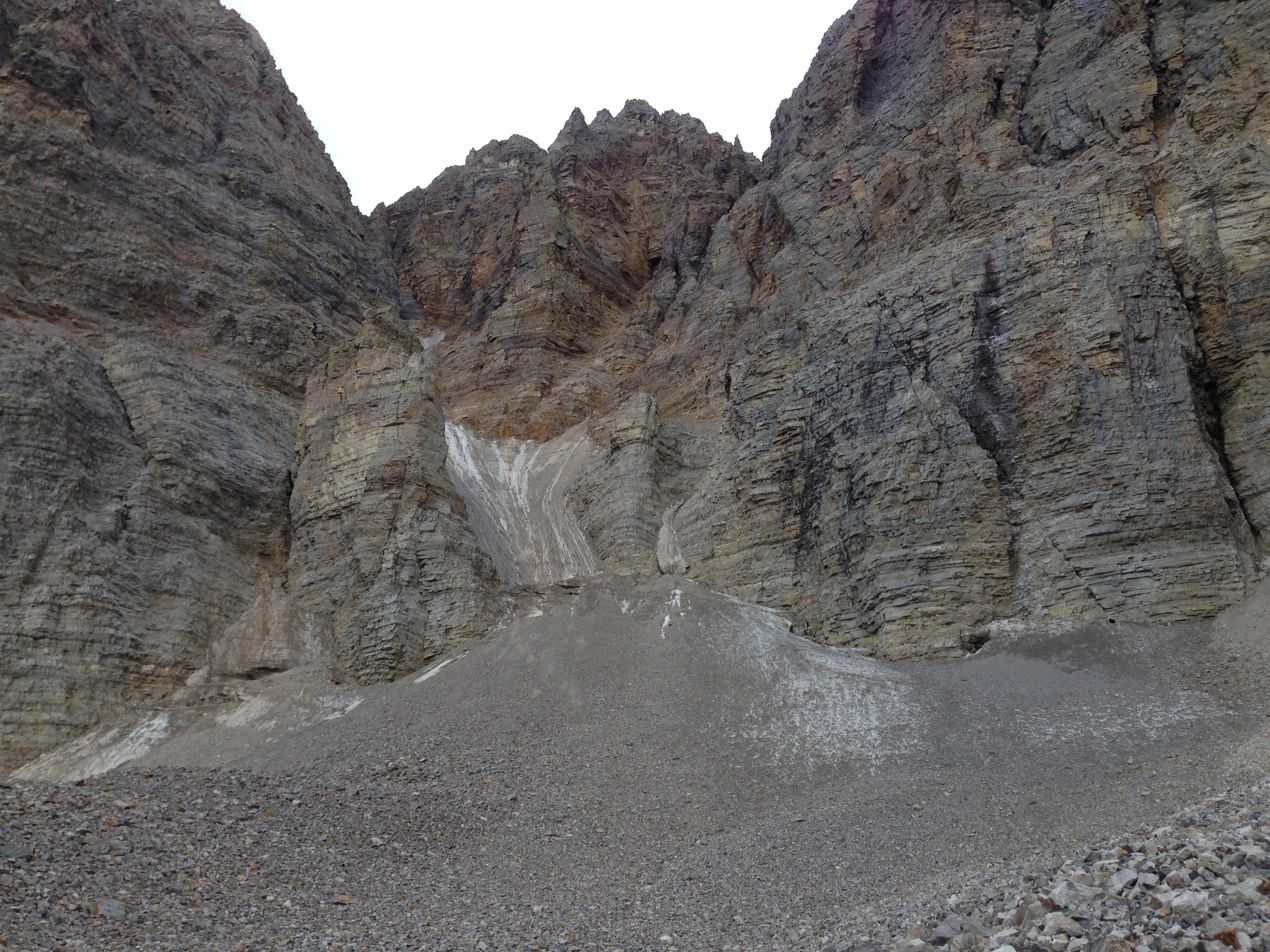
- Wheeler Peak Glacier as it appeared in September 2014

- Location within Nevada
- Type: Rock and ice glacier
- Location: Wheeler Peak, Great Basin National Park, White Pine County, Nevada, U.S.
- Coordinates: 38°59′09″N 114°18′50″W
- Length: .20 mi (0.32 km)
- Terminus: Talus
- Status: Retreating

Wheeler Peak Glacier is a glacier situated at the base of Wheeler Peak within Great Basin National Park in the U.S. state of Nevada. It is the only glacier in the state, and one of the southernmost glaciers in the United States. At a height of 13,063 feet (3,982 m), Wheeler Peak is the tallest mountain in the Snake Range and the second tallest mountain in Nevada. The mountain top is also considered to be a horn, a peak carved and shaped by glaciers over a long period of time.

The Wheeler Peak glacier can be considered an alpine glacier which started melting at 9,000 feet (2,700 m) and the effects of the glacier can easily be seen by observing the pathways (slopes, canyons, and streams) that the melting glacial water has cut through over several years. The glacier is also unique in that it contains many rocks and minerals, including limestone (found in the Lehman Caves), marble, sandstone, shale, quartzite, granite, aragonite, moonmilk, and gypsum.

== Glacier details ==
At about 120,000 square feet (11,000 m^{2}) in size, the Wheeler Peak Glacier is fairly small, and is generally considered to be an alpine glacier. This type of small glacier is generally found in mountainous terrain, and is also sometimes referred to as a "mountain", "niche", or "cirque" glacier.

The ice visible on the surface is only a portion of the whole glacier, the rest is covered with debris and therefore considered to be a rock glacier.

Looking at the glacier, it is easy to see arc-shaped ridges on the ice surface. The curvature is due to the way the glacier has grown; ice mass near the midline of the glacier creep faster than those on either side, causing the curvature. Because Wheeler Peak has a northeast-facing headwall, it has perennial snow, and is able to protect the glacier from the sun.

== Access ==
There are several locations within the park from which the glacier can be viewed. The only vista available from the road, however, is from the Wheeler Peak Overlook on the Wheeler Peak Scenic Drive. The glacier can be seen at the bottom of the Wheeler Peak rock face. The Bristlecone/Glacier Trail can be used to access the foot of the glacier, and is approximately 4.6 miles (7.4 km) roundtrip. The trailhead can be found at the end of the Wheeler Peak Scenic Drive, and climbs from an initial elevation of 9,800 feet (3,000 m) to approximately 10,900 feet (3,300 m). Hikers should be cautious when using the trail, as boulders may be unstable and small rockslides are common.

== Climate history and change ==
The Wheeler Peak Glacier is a vestige of the Last Glacial Maximum, when the climate was as much as 8 degrees (F) cooler than it is today. During that time period, glaciers moved down to as low as 9,200 feet (2,800 m), but subsequent warming during the Holocene Epoch (starting 10,000 years ago) caused widespread melting of both continental glaciers and other alpine glaciers. Specifically, there has been a global retreat of glaciers since 1850. Given current warming trends, the Wheeler Peak Glacier will likely disappear within the next 20 years.

== See also ==
- List of glaciers in the United States
