= Great Basin National Heritage Area =

United States National Heritage Area in Nevada and Utah

Coordinates: 39.0137°N 114.1235°W

Great Basin National Heritage Area is a federally designated National Heritage Area in Nevada and Utah, including White Pine County, Nevada and Millard County, Utah. The area was designated to recognize and promote the scenic and cultural resources associated with this central portion of the Great Basin.

The National Heritage Area includes Great Basin National Park and portions of Humboldt-Toiyabe and Fishlake National Forests, as well as Fort Deseret, Sevier Lake and the Topaz War Relocation Center.

Great Basin National Heritage Area was designated on October 13, 2006.

The name was changed from Great Basin National Heritage Route to Great Basin National Heritage Area in 2023.
