= Highland Ridge Wilderness =

Protected area in Nevada, United States

- IUCN category Ib (wilderness area)
- Location within Nevada Location within the United States
- Location: White Pine County, Nevada, United States
- Nearest city: Baker, Nevada
- Coordinates: 38.7743622866°N 114.241679697°W
- Area: 68,627 acres (27,772 ha)
- Established: December 20, 2006
- Governing body: U.S. Bureau of Land Management

Highland Ridge Wilderness is a 68,627-acre (27,772 ha) wilderness area in the southern part of the Snake Range of White Pine County, just south of Great Basin National Park, in the U.S. state of Nevada. Located approximately 20 miles (32 km) south of the town of Baker, the Wilderness was designated in 2006 and is administered by the U.S. Bureau of Land Management.

The topography of Highland Ridge Wilderness varies from gently sloping bajadas to rolling foothills to steep ridgelines. This variety of terrain provides excellent habitat for wildlife including mule deer, cougar, northern goshawk, and several species of bat. The pinyon and juniper-covered mountains, steep rocky ridges, and deep drainages provide contiguous protection to some of the basin lands that comprise much of this region of the state.

== See also ==
- List of wilderness areas in Nevada
- List of U.S. Wilderness Areas
- Wilderness Act
