= Lehman Orchard and Aqueduct =

Historic site in Nevada, United States

- U.S. National Register of Historic Places
- U.S. Historic district
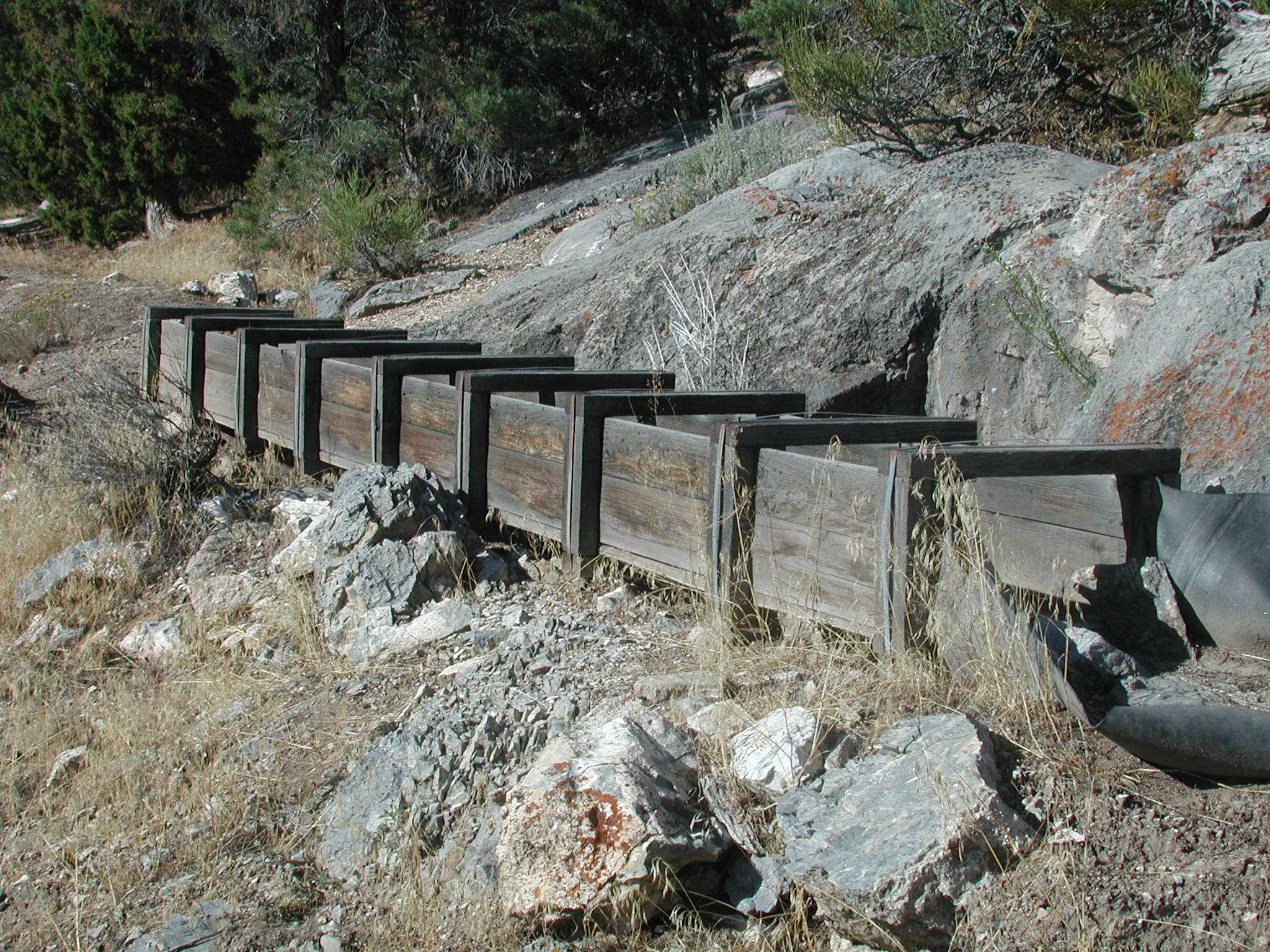

- Location within Nevada Location within the United States
- Nearest city: Baker, Nevada
- Coordinates: 39°0′22″N 114°13′5″W
- Built: 1891
- NRHP reference No.: 75000181
- Added to NRHP: February 25, 1975

The Lehman Orchard and Aqueduct were established by Absalom Lehman, the discoverer of Lehman Caves in what would become Great Basin National Park in eastern Nevada. Lehman's orchard covered more than 7 acres (2.8 ha), with about 40 apricot, pear, peach, crabapple, plum and apple trees in the 1930s, of more than 100 trees at its peak. Seven apricot trees and one peach tree remain. To irrigate the orchard, Lehman built a ditch from Lehman Creek 2 miles (3.2 km) to the orchard, where it encircles the orchard. A branch above the orchard ran to a reservoir, now vanished, that was used for ice, fishing and swimming. A portion of the aqueduct has been reconstructed. Both the orchard and the reconstructed portion of the ditch are near the National Park Service's Lehman Caves Visitor Center.

The orchard and aqueduct were placed on the National Register of Historic Places in 1975.
