= Rhodes Cabin =

Historic house in Nevada, United States

- U.S. National Register of Historic Places
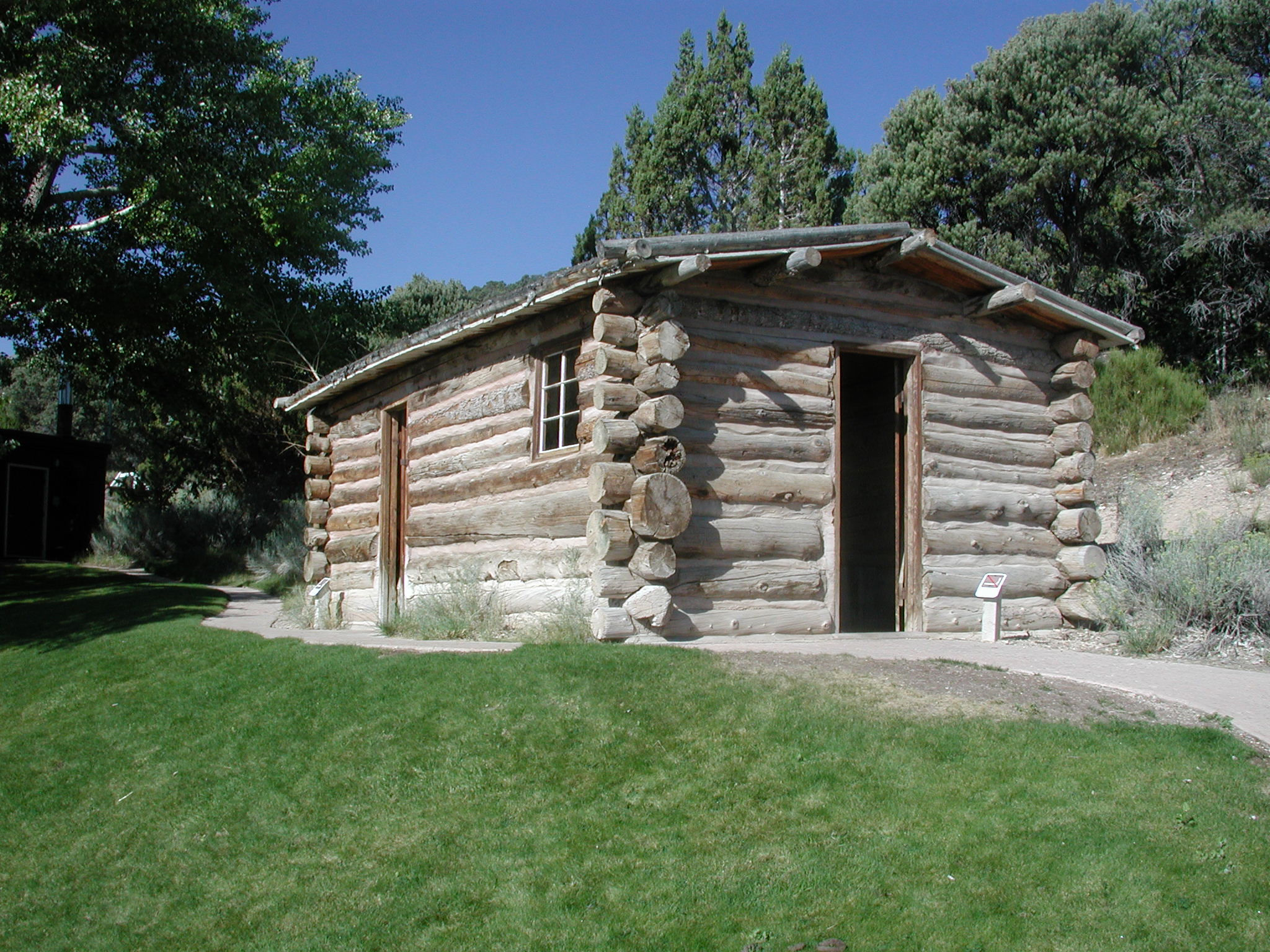

- Location within Nevada Location within the United States
- Nearest city: Baker, Nevada
- Coordinates: 39°0′20″N 114°13′9″W
- Built: 1928
- NRHP reference No.: 75000180
- Added to NRHP: February 25, 1975

The Rhodes Cabin was built in 1928 to accommodate tourists visiting what was then Lehman Caves National Monument, now Great Basin National Park. The cabin was one of several built by local contractor Charles Davis near the entrance to Lehman Caves for concessioners Clarence and Bea Rhodes. Rhodes built a number of structures in the area, including the "Pine Bowery" and the "Lehman Tea Room", as well as developing access within Lehman Cave.

The one room log cabin measures 19 by 11 feet (5.8 m × 3.4 m), with two doors, four windows and a dirt floor. The cabin is now part of an interpretative exhibit.

The state of Nevada paid Rhodes $15,000 for his facilities in 1932 and donated the property to the Park Service in 1933. During the 1930s the cabin was converted for housing for National Park Service employees. It is one of the last surviving structures of its era in the park.

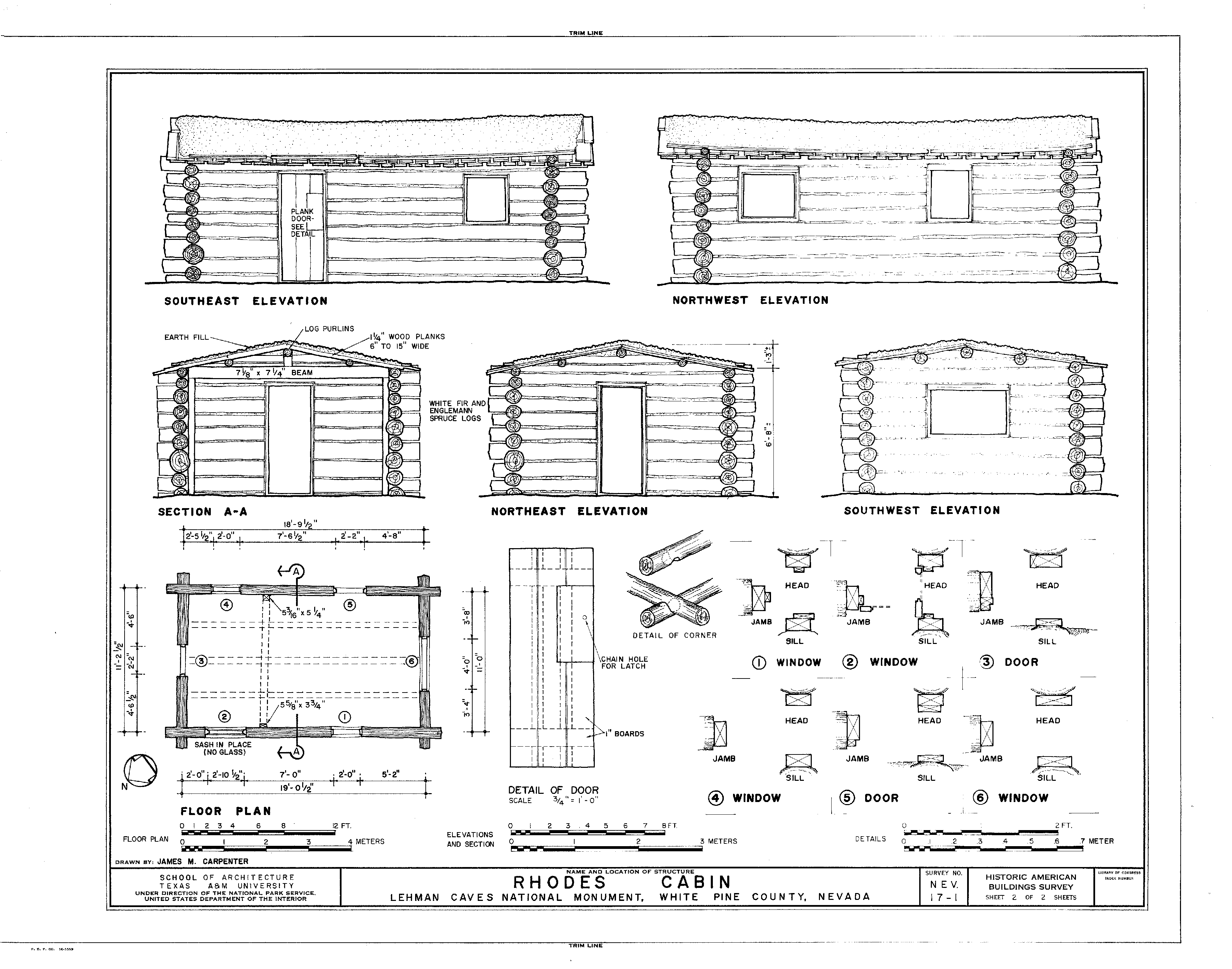
Rhodes Cabin as documented by the Historic American Buildings Survey, 1965
