= Wheeler Peak (Nevada) =

Mountain in Nevada, United States

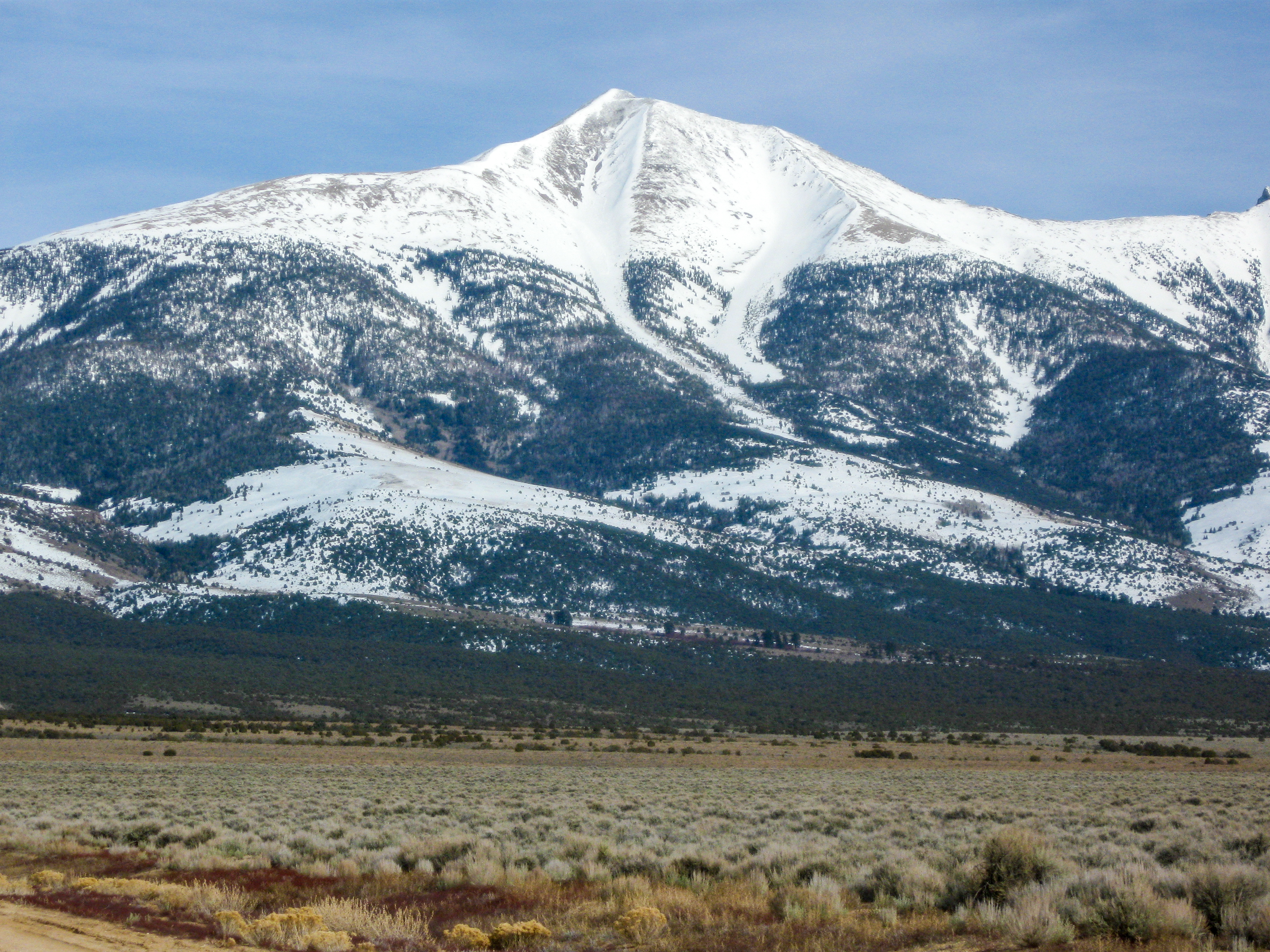
- Wheeler Peak, looking east-southeast in late afternoon light

Highest point
- Elevation: 13,065 ft (3,982 m) NAVD 88
- Prominence: 7,563 ft (2,305 m)
- Listing: North America prominent peaks 53rd; North America isolated peaks 51st; Nevada county high points 2nd; Great Basin Peaks List
- Coordinates: 38°59′10″N 114°18′48″W

Geography
- Location within Nevada
- Location: White Pine County, Nevada, U.S.
- Parent range: Snake Range
- Topo map: USGS Wheeler Peak

Climbing
- Easiest route: Trail hike (class 1)

Wheeler Peak is the tallest mountain in the Snake Range and in White Pine County, in Nevada, United States. The summit elevation of 13,065 feet (3,982 m) makes it the second-highest peak in Nevada, just behind Boundary Peak. With a topographic prominence of 7,563 feet (2,305 m), Wheeler Peak is the most topographically prominent peak in White Pine County and the second-most prominent peak in Nevada, just behind Mount Charleston. The mountain is located in Great Basin National Park and was named for George Wheeler, leader of the Wheeler Survey of the late 19th century.

== Peak features ==
Wheeler Peak has an impressive headwall above a large glacial cirque, large moraines and an active rock glacier. The top of the mountain is covered by deep snow most of the year. A paved road runs from the Great Basin National Park visitor center to several small camping areas, the highest more than halfway up the mountain. The mountain's prominence is due to a Miocene detachment fault that brought the deep Cambrian Prospect Mountain quartzite to the top of the mountain.

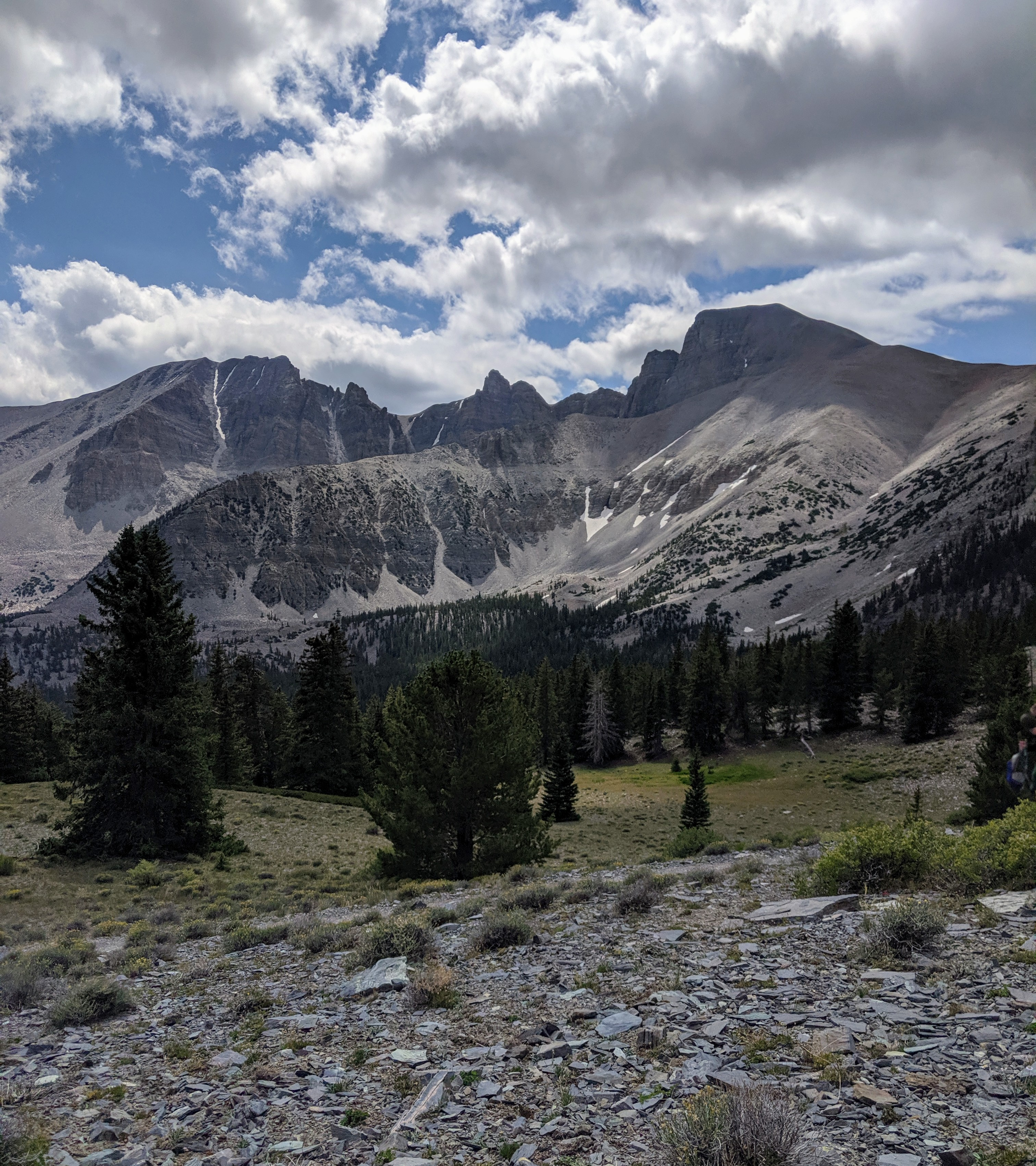
Wheeler Peak from the north on the summit trail

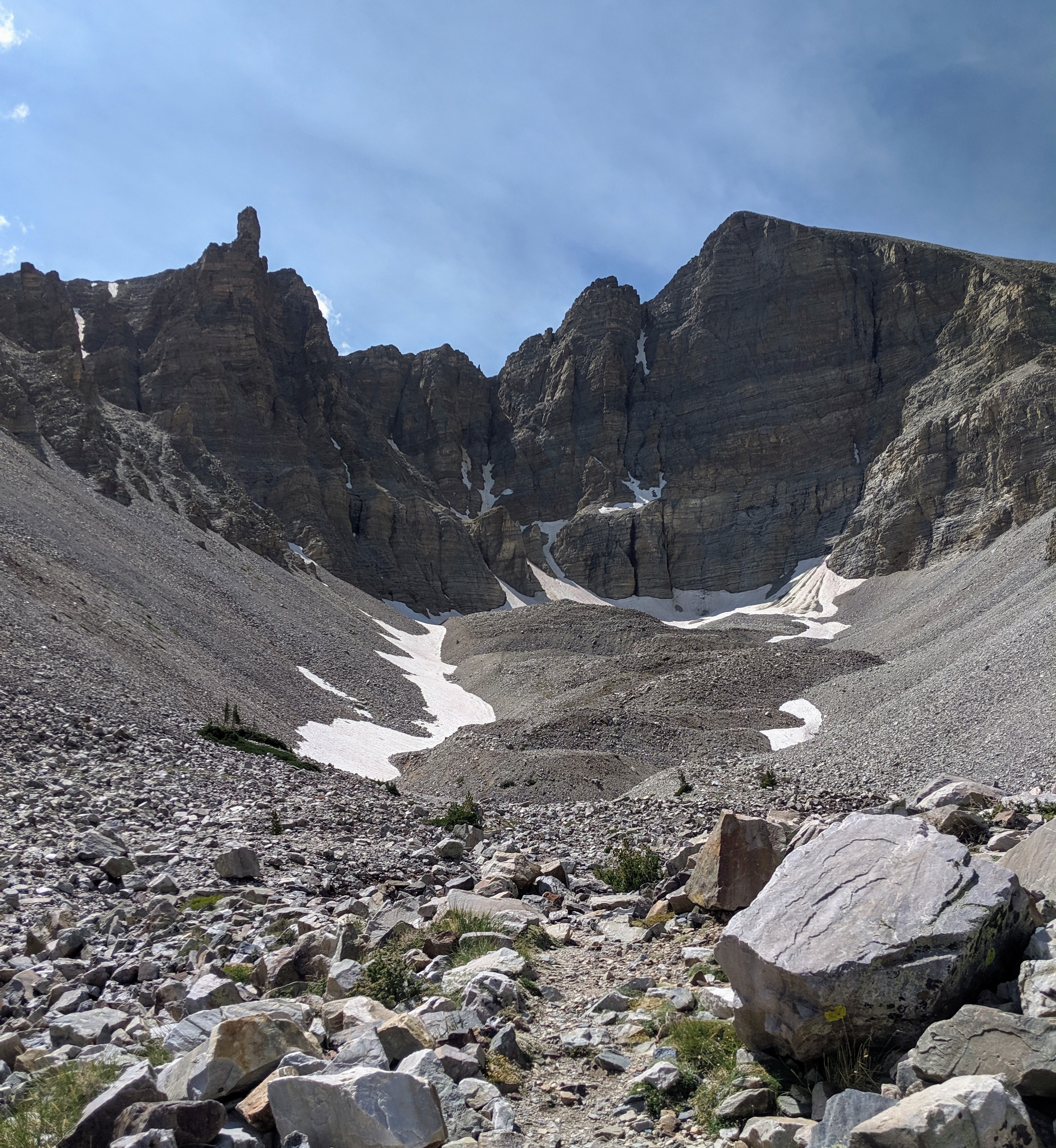
View of the Wheeler Peak cirque from the Glacier Trail

=== Doso Doyabi ===
Doso Doyabi stands about one mile to the east of Wheeler and reaches 12,775 feet (3,894 m) with 138 metres (453 ft) of prominence. In 1854–1855, Lieutenant Colonel Edward Steptoe named what is now Wheeler Peak in honor of Jefferson Davis. Davis was then serving as Secretary of War in the United States government. In 1869, during the Wheeler Survey, it was proposed that the peak be named after George Wheeler. Wheeler states that the idea was abandoned when it was learned that in 1859 James H. Simpson had suggested naming the peak "Union", though the Wheeler name was later used for the primary peak. In January 2019 the Nevada State Board on Geographic Names approved changing the name of Jeff Davis Peak to Doso Doyabi, which means White Mountain in Shoshone; later that year, the change was approved by the United States Board on Geographic Names.

== Climate ==
Climate data for Wheeler Peak NV 38.9842 N, 114.3193 W, Elevation: 12,405 ft (3,781 m) (1991–2020 normals)
Month	Jan	Feb	Mar	Apr	May	Jun	Jul	Aug	Sep	Oct	Nov	Dec	Year
Mean daily maximum °F (°C)	25.3 (−3.7)	23.7 (−4.6)	28.1 (−2.2)	33.2 (0.7)	42.0 (5.6)	53.4 (11.9)	61.6 (16.4)	60.2 (15.7)	52.7 (11.5)	41.9 (5.5)	31.8 (−0.1)	24.6 (−4.1)	39.9 (4.4)
Daily mean °F (°C)	16.7 (−8.5)	15.1 (−9.4)	18.6 (−7.4)	22.7 (−5.2)	29.9 (−1.2)	40.4 (4.7)	48.6 (9.2)	47.4 (8.6)	40.9 (4.9)	31.9 (−0.1)	23.5 (−4.7)	16.8 (−8.4)	29.4 (−1.5)
Mean daily minimum °F (°C)	8.2 (−13.2)	6.5 (−14.2)	9.0 (−12.8)	12.2 (−11.0)	17.9 (−7.8)	27.3 (−2.6)	35.6 (2.0)	34.5 (1.4)	29.2 (−1.6)	21.9 (−5.6)	15.2 (−9.3)	9.0 (−12.8)	18.9 (−7.3)
Average precipitation inches (mm)	4.30 (109)	4.69 (119)	4.39 (112)	4.82 (122)	3.62 (92)	1.67 (42)	1.77 (45)	1.98 (50)	2.13 (54)	3.02 (77)	2.98 (76)	3.89 (99)	39.26 (997)
Source: PRISM Climate Group

== Access ==
A well-maintained trail, the Wheeler Peak Summit Trail, leads from a trail-head near the end of Wheeler Peak Scenic Drive directly to the summit, making for a class 1 hike. Afternoon storms are likely during the summer.

== Wheeler Peak vs. Boundary Peak ==
The distinction of highest point in Nevada goes to the summit of Boundary Peak, so named because it is just east of the Nevada-California border, at the northern terminus of the White Mountains. Wheeler Peak is, however, the tallest independent mountain in the state since Boundary Peak is considered a subsidiary summit of Montgomery Peak, whose summit is in California. The topographic prominence of Boundary Peak is 253 feet (77 m), which falls under the often used 300-foot (91 m) cutoff for an independent peak. Also, Boundary Peak is less than 1 mile (1.6 km) away from its higher neighbor, while Wheeler Peak is over 230 miles from the nearest higher peak.

By contrast the prominence of Wheeler Peak, at 7,563 feet (2,305 m), is the twelfth largest in the contiguous United States. It is also the twelfth most topographically isolated summit in the contiguous United States.

== Nearby features ==
Wheeler Peak 3D

The limestone Lehman Caves, at the base of the mountain, feature a large collection of shield formations. Tours of the caves are offered year round by the National Park Service. Higher up on the glacial moraine is a grove of ancient Great Basin bristlecone pines of great age. A bristlecone pine named Prometheus, which was at least 4,862 years old and the oldest known non-clonal organism, grew here before it was inadvertently cut down in 1964 as part of a research project. Limber pine, which can live for over 1,000 years, is also found in the area.

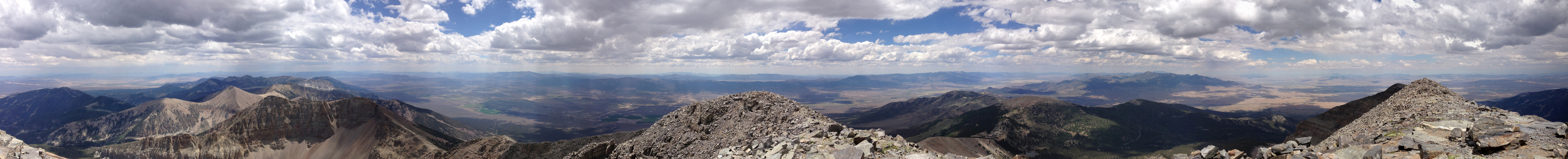
360-degree panorama from the summit of Wheeler Peak

== See also ==
- List of Ultras of the United States
- List of highest points in Nevada by county
