= Snake Range =

Mountain range in White Pine County, Nevada, United States

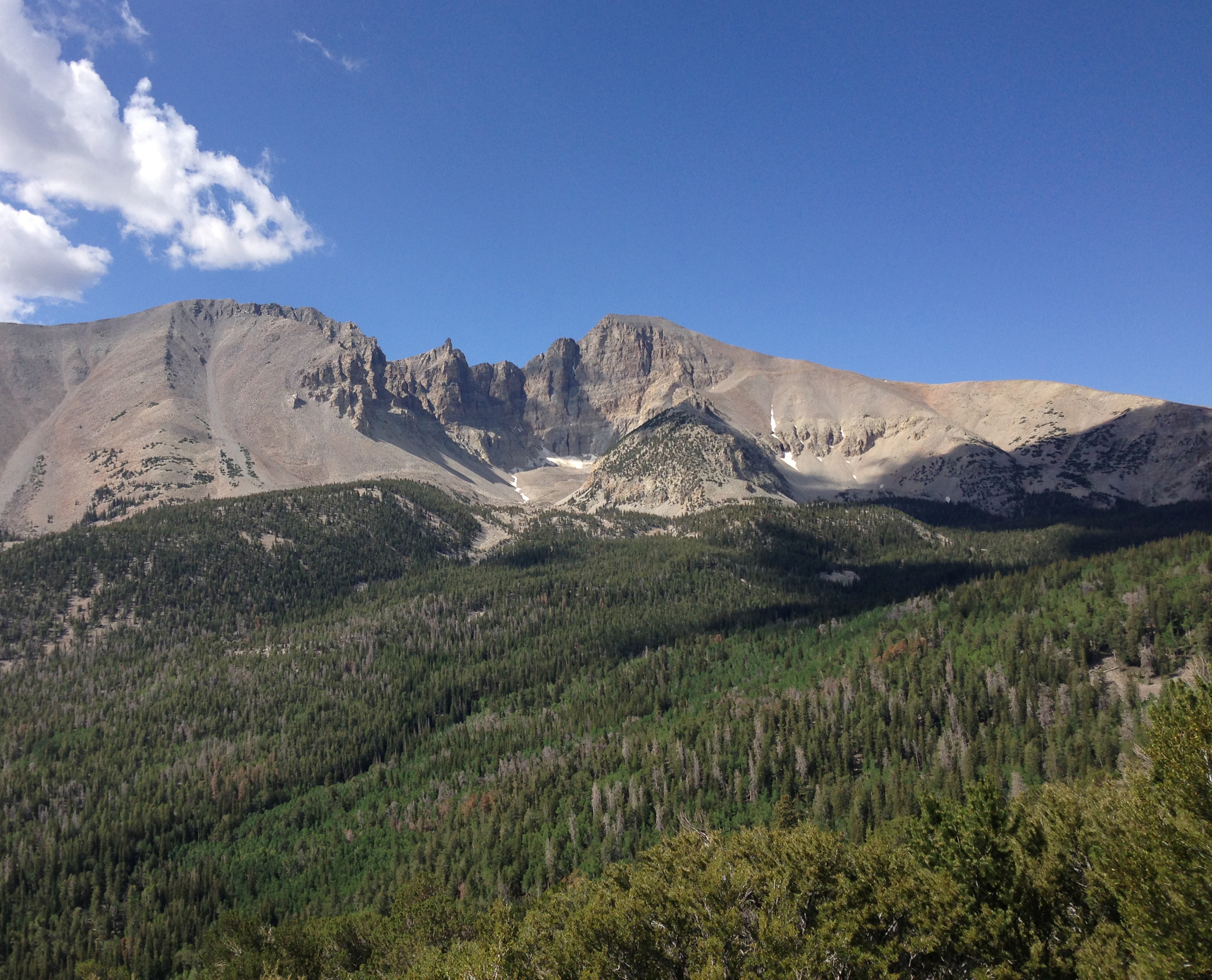
- Wheeler Peak, highest mountain in the Snake Range

Highest point
- Peak: Wheeler Peak
- Elevation: 13,063 ft (3,982 m)
- Coordinates: 38°59′09″N 114°18′50″W

Dimensions
- Length: 60 mi (97 km) North-South

Geography
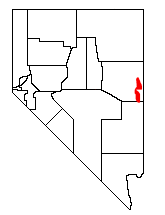
- Location of the Snake Range within Nevada
- Country: United States
- State: Nevada
- Borders on: Schell Creek Range and Confusion Range

The Snake Range is a mountain range in White Pine County, Nevada, United States. The south-central portion of the range is included within Great Basin National Park, with most of the remainder included within the Humboldt-Toiyabe National Forest. The range reaches a maximum elevation of 13,065 feet (3,982 m) at the summit of Wheeler Peak, the tallest independent mountain within Nevada and the second highest point within the state (the highest point being Boundary Peak). The range also contains four of the five highest mountain peaks in Nevada, including all peaks greater than 12,000 feet (3,658 m) except for Boundary Peak.

== Geography ==
Typical of other ranges in the Basin and Range Province, the Snake Range runs in a north–south direction, for approximately 60 miles (97 km).

To the west are Spring Valley and the Schell Creek Range, and to the east across the Utah border are Snake Valley and the Confusion Range. Sacramento Pass (7,154 feet [2,181 m]) is where U.S. Route 6-50, the "Loneliest Highway in America", crosses the range. It is the principal means of eastbound access to this part of eastern Nevada.

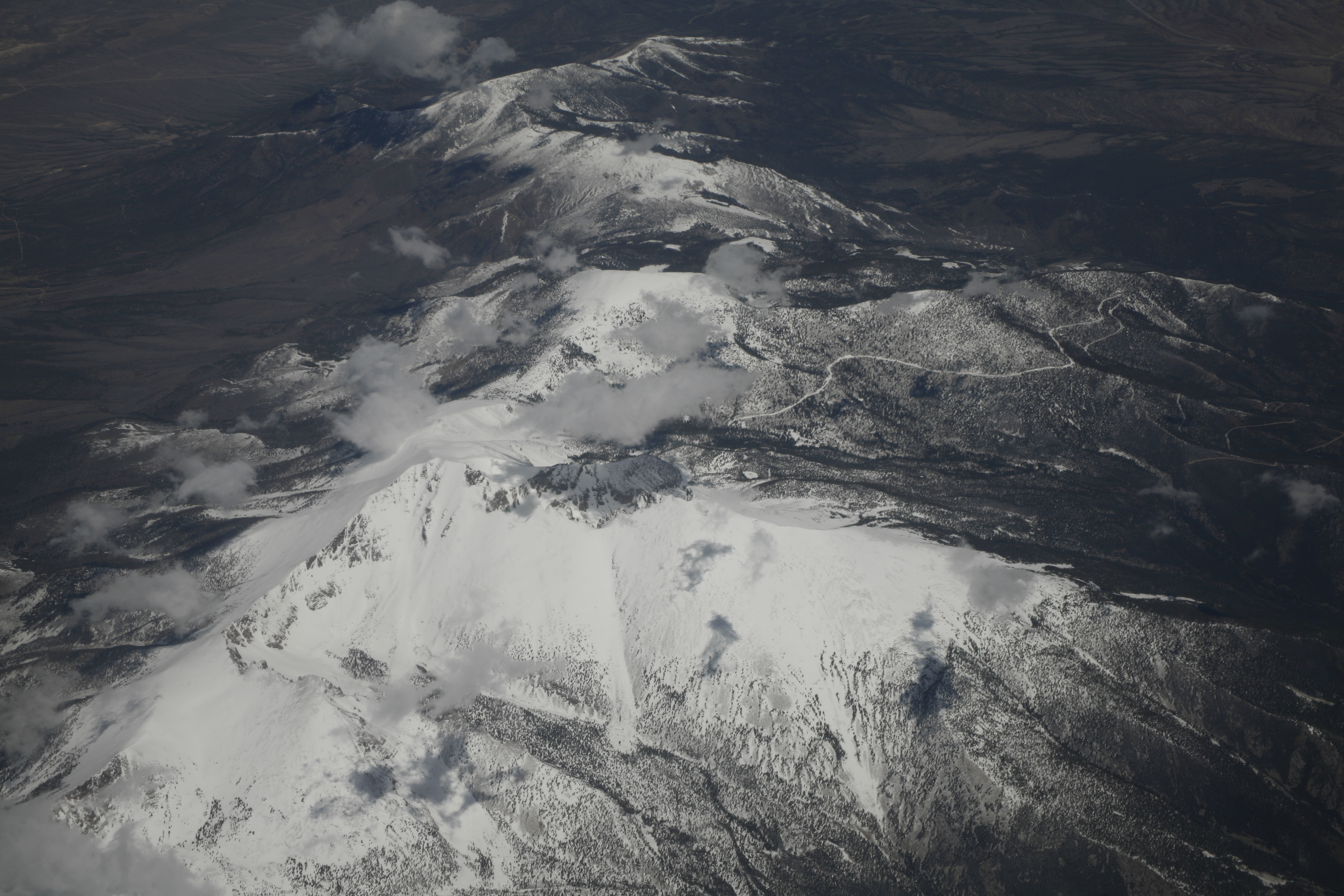
Wheeler Peak and the Snake Range, looking north

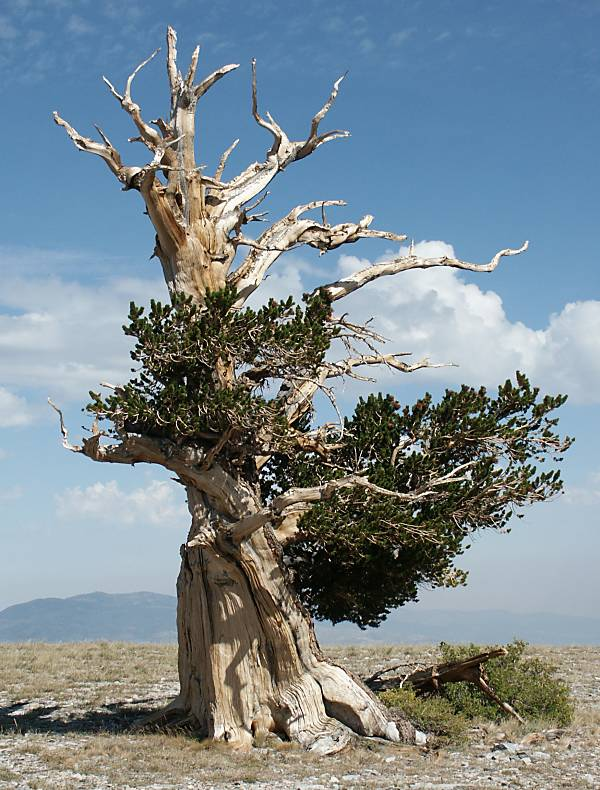
Great Basin Bristlecone Pine (Pinus longaeva) on 'The Table'

== Natural history ==
Great Basin National Park is located in the southern section of the Snake Range. Established in 1986, it protects the unique geologic and habitat features of the mountain range and Great Basin Desert, and their representations of the Central Basin and Range ecoregion. The southern section also includes the natural rock Lexington Arch (83 feet (25 m) span), and the Lehman Caves, both formed from the range's limestone.

Several large groves of ancient Great Basin Bristlecone Pine (Pinus longaeva) trees thrive in the Great Basin montane forests of the range's higher elevations.

The higher elevations of the Snake Range in the northern section are protected by the Mount Moriah Wilderness Area, and in the southern section by the Highland Ridge Wilderness.

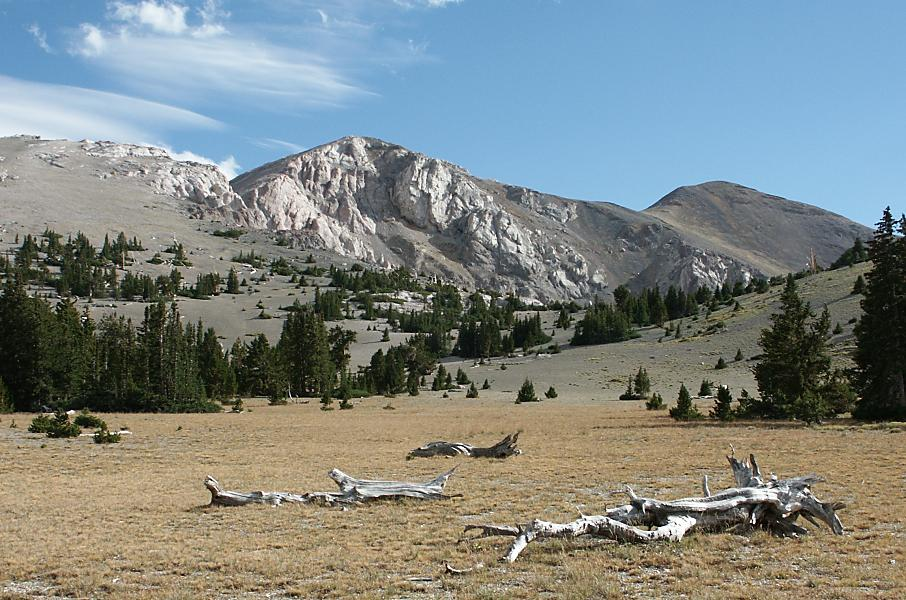
Mt. Moriah and Great Basin Bristlecone Pines, looking southwest from "The Table"

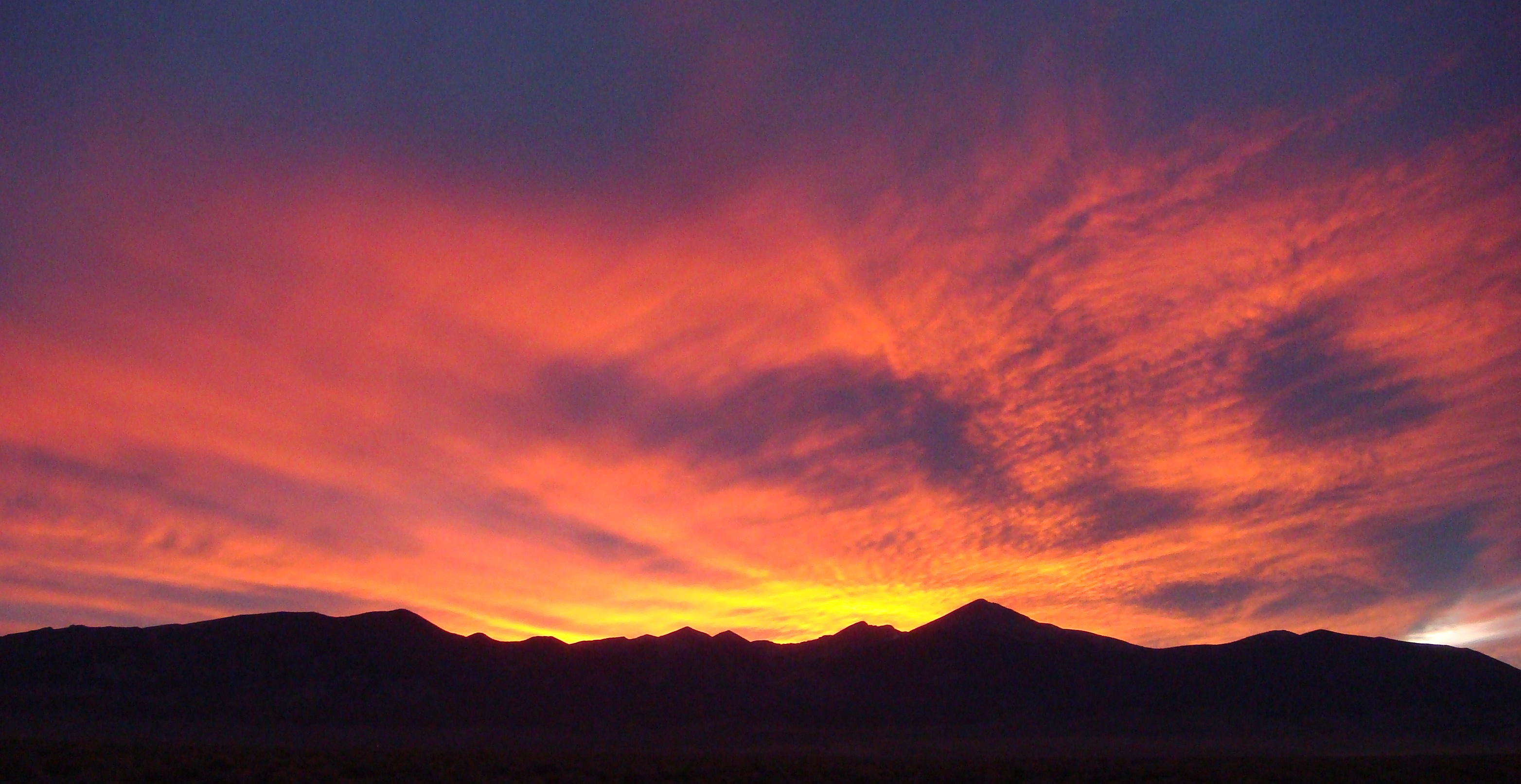
Wheeler Peak and the southern Snake Range at sunset

== Peaks ==
=== Southern ===
The Snake Range includes two groups of peaks. The southern section rises quickly from a point near the border with Lincoln County, reaching the summit of Granite Peak (11,218 feet [3,419 m]) just 10 miles (16 km) to the north.

From there northwards the range continues to rise, passing Lincoln Peak (11,597 feet [3,535 m]), Mt. Washington (11,658 feet [3,553 m]), Pyramid Peak (11,926 feet [3,635 m]), Baker Peak (12,298 feet [3,748 m]), and Doso Doyabi (12,775 feet [3,894 m]).

It finally reaches its apex at Wheeler Peak (13,063 feet [3,982 m]).

=== Northern ===
North of Wheeler Peak the range begins to drop, reaching 7,154 feet (2,181 m) at Sacramento Pass, just 11 miles (18 km) to the north. Sacramento Pass is where the more remote northern section of the range begins.

In just 12 miles (19 km) the North Snake Range rises past Silver Creek Canyon and Hendrys Creek Canyon to the summit of photogenic Mt. Moriah (12,067 feet [3,678 m]). To the north of this peak is an unusual formation, a flat plateau of sub-alpine tundra called "The Table", covering about 2 square miles (5.2 km^{2}) at an elevation of 11,000 feet (3,400 m). A grove of ancient Great Basin Bristlecone Pines grows on this plateau near the peak.

North of "The Table" is another unusual geologic feature. Deadman Creek and Smith Creek, draining eastward into Snake Valley, combine to carve a deep canyon into the range. The mouth of this canyon lies below 3,000-foot (910 m) cliffs, 6,000 feet (1,800 m) below and 6 miles (9.7 km) away from the summit of Mt. Moriah.

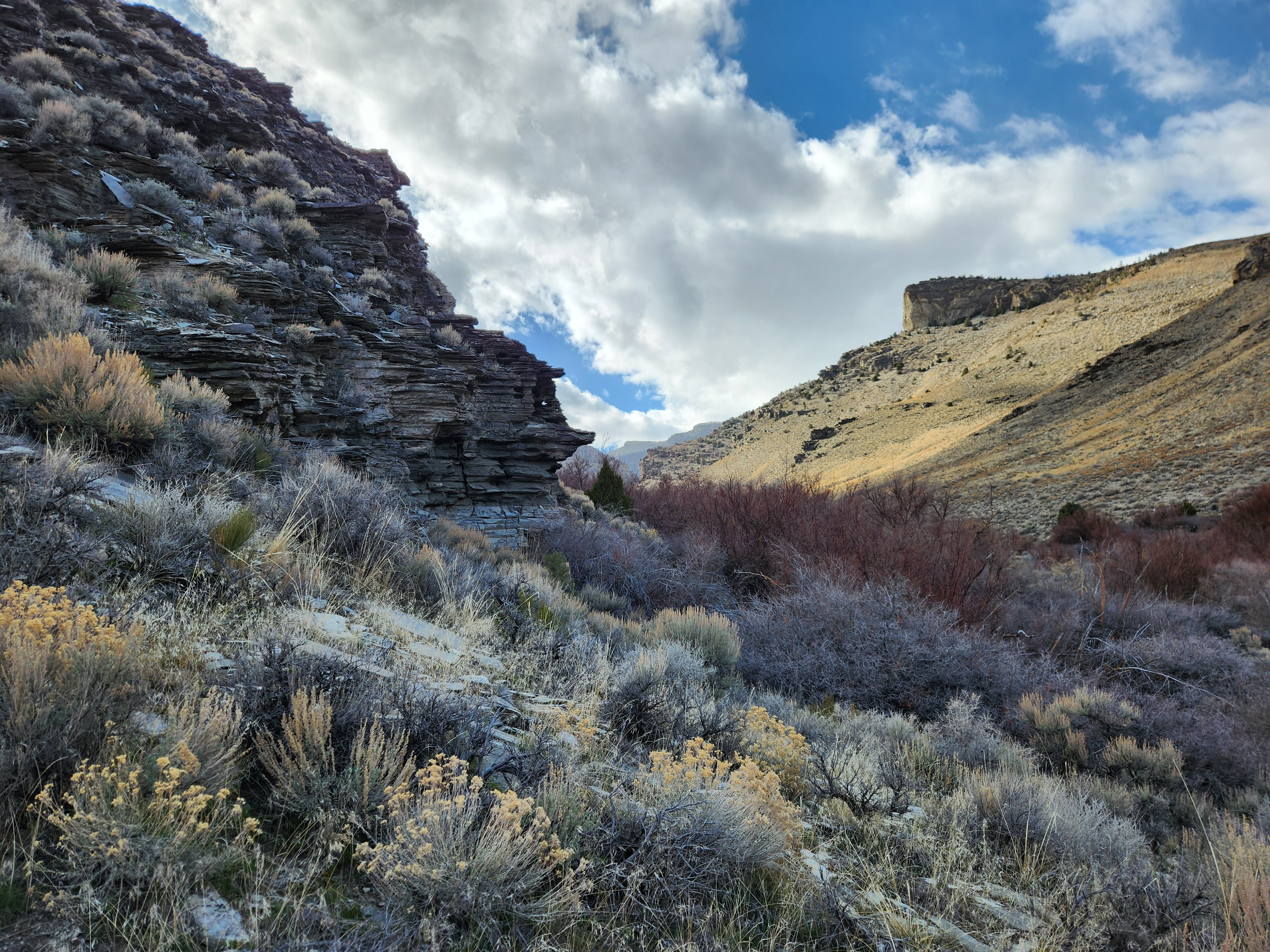
Metamorphic rocks in Hendry's Creek Canyon in the North Snake Range

The North Snake Range is an important geologic feature, containing some of the world's best examples of metamorphic rock and extensional deformation. The range has been designated as only the first 100 geoheritage sites by the International Union of Geological Sciences (IUGS). Instead of normal faulting creating basins and ranges, like is seen throughout most of the Great Basin, the North Snake Range metamorphic core complex has undergone ductile deformation so that the metamorphic rocks have been stretched resulting in rocks that are 10% of their original thickness, stretching like taffy.
