= Great Basin National Park =

National park in Nevada, United States

- IUCN category II (national park)
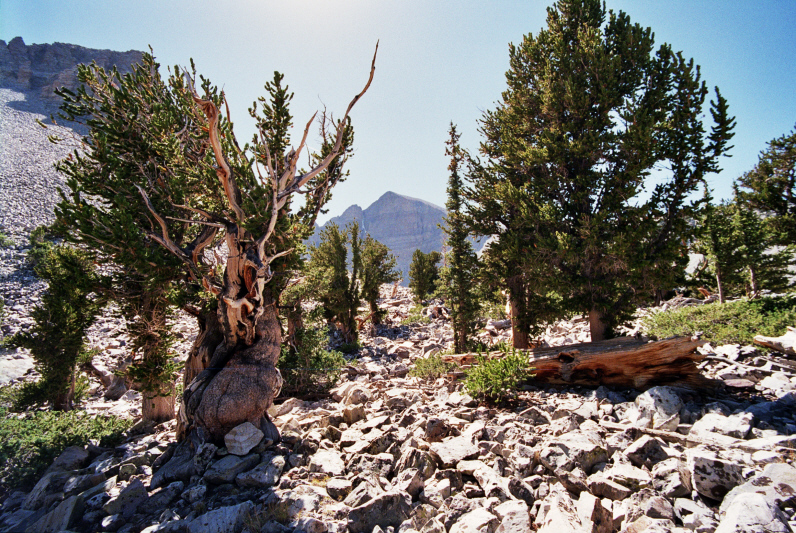
- Bristlecone pine and Wheeler Peak
- Interactive map of Great Basin National Park
- Location: White Pine County, Nevada, United States
- Nearest city: Ely, Baker, Border
- Coordinates: 39.006°N 114.22°W
- Area: 77,180 acres (312.3 km^{2})
- Established: October 27, 1986; 39 years ago
- Visitors: 144,875 (in 2021)
- Governing body: National Park Service
- Website: nps.gov/grba

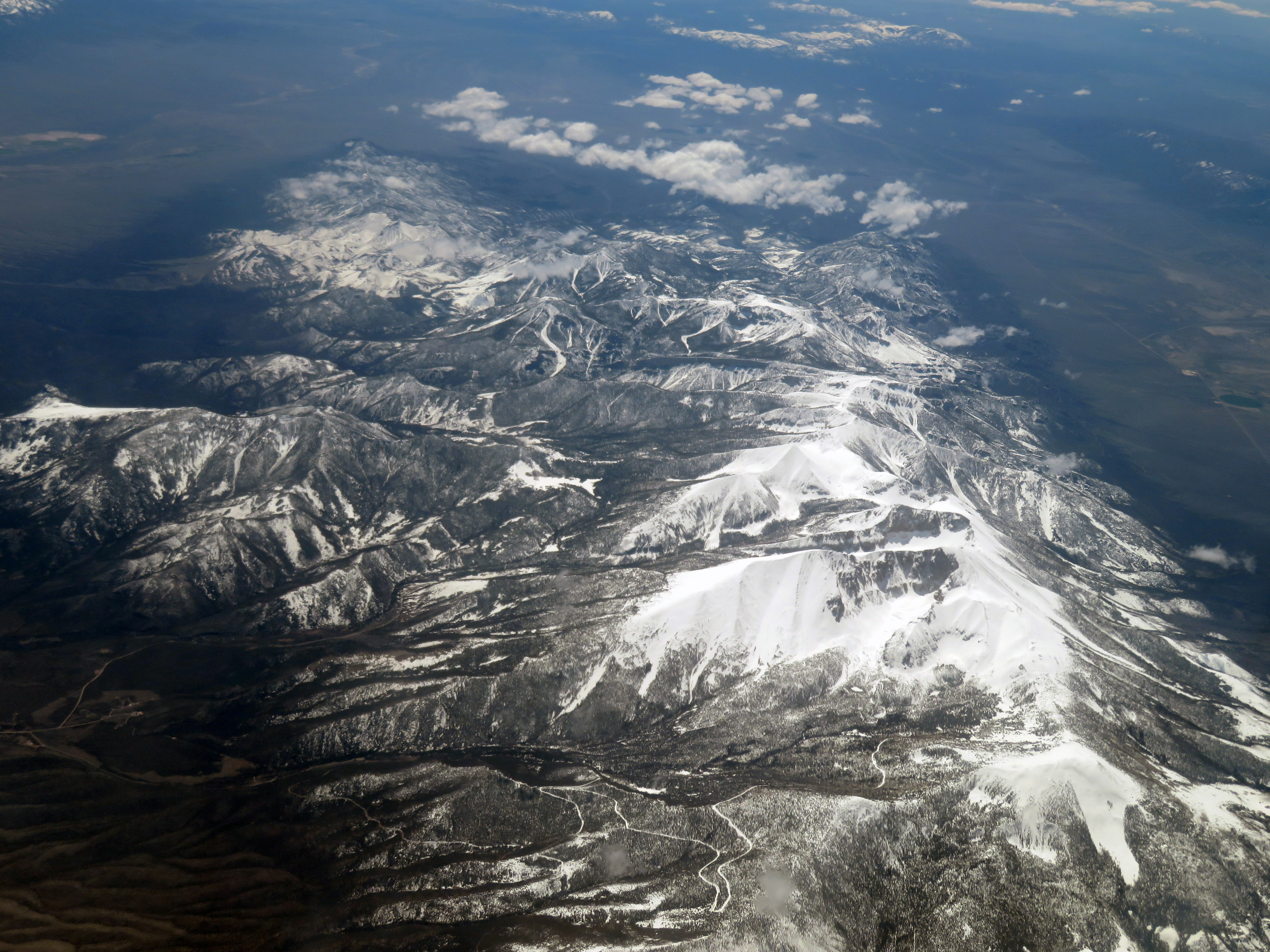
Great Basin National Park aerial view

Great Basin National Park is a national park of the United States located in White Pine County in east-central Nevada, near the Utah border. Established 40 years ago in 1986, the park is most commonly entered by way of Nevada State Route 488, which is connected to U.S. Routes 6 and 50 by Nevada State Route 487 via the small town of Baker, the closest settlement.

The park derives its name from the Great Basin, the dry and mountainous region between the Sierra Nevada and the Wasatch Mountains. Topographically, this area is known as the Basin and Range Province. The park is located about 290 miles (470 km) north of Las Vegas and protects 77,180 acres (121 sq mi; 312 km^{2}).

The park is notable for its groves of ancient bristlecone pines, the oldest known living non-clonal organisms; Lehman Caves; Wheeler Peak Glacier, below 13,063-foot (3,982 m) Wheeler Peak; and some of the darkest night skies in the contiguous United States.

President Warren G. Harding created Lehman Caves National Monument by presidential proclamation on January 24, 1922. The monument and its surroundings was designated a national park on October 27, 1986, following the advocacy of Congressman Harry Reid.

A number of developed campsites are within the park, as well as backcountry camping opportunities. The Highland Ridge Wilderness lies adjacent to Great Basin National Park. These two protected areas provide contiguous wildlife habitat and protection to 227.8 square miles (590.0 km^{2}) of eastern Nevada's basin lands.

== Natural history ==
=== Flora ===
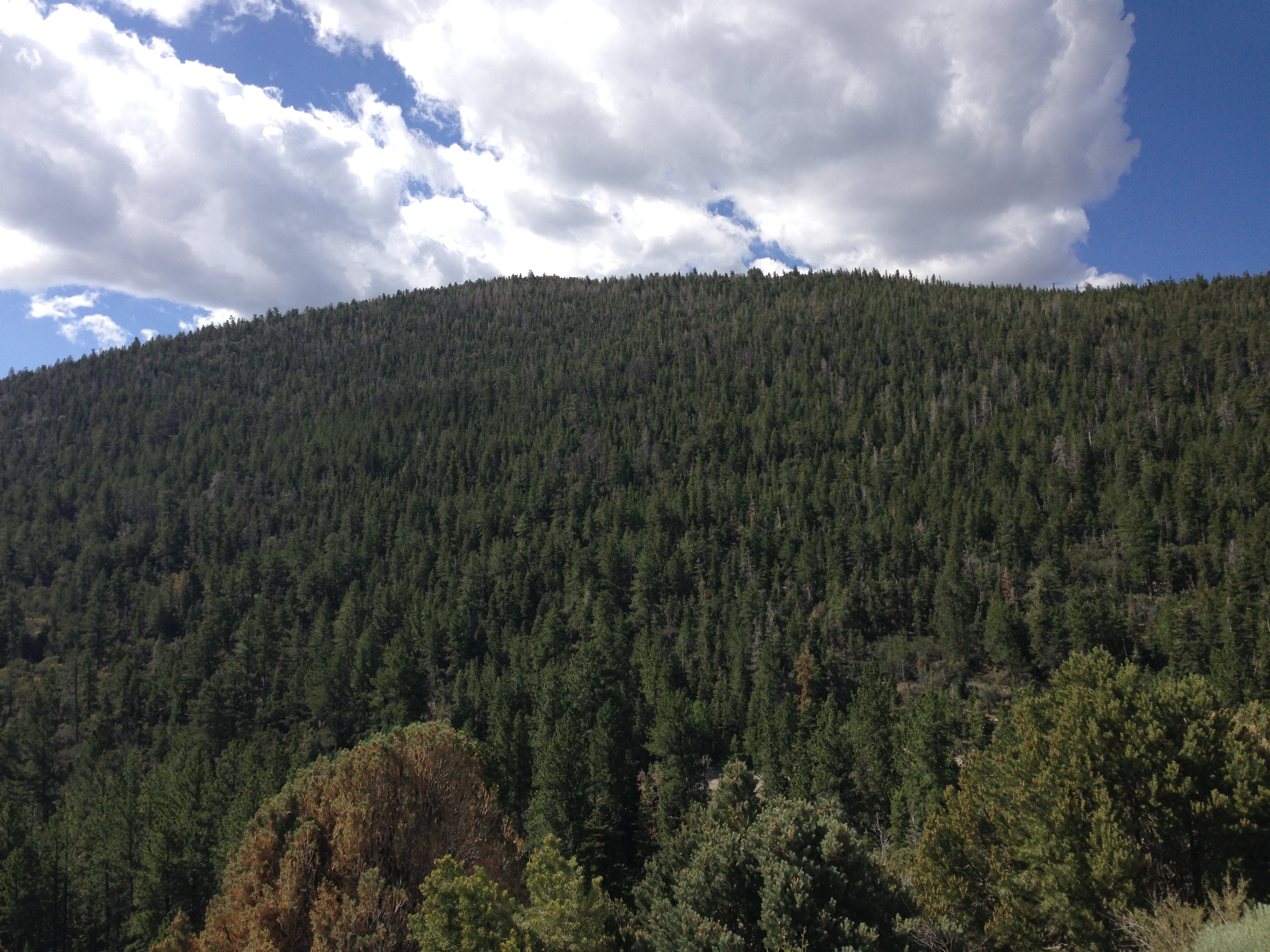
Conifers thrive at middle elevations of Wheeler Peak.

Eleven species of conifer trees and over 800 species of plants are found in Great Basin National Park and the neighboring valleys.

The area around the Visitor Center is dominated by plants such as sagebrush, saltbush, single-leaf pinyon, and Utah juniper. Higher elevations are home to mountain meadows, white fir, quaking aspen, Engelmann spruce, and large Ponderosa pine. At treeline is an alpine area of low, delicate plants and rocky outcroppings. There are several endemic species of plants that are found in the park, some of which include Mt. Wheeler sandwort and Holgrem's buckwheat.

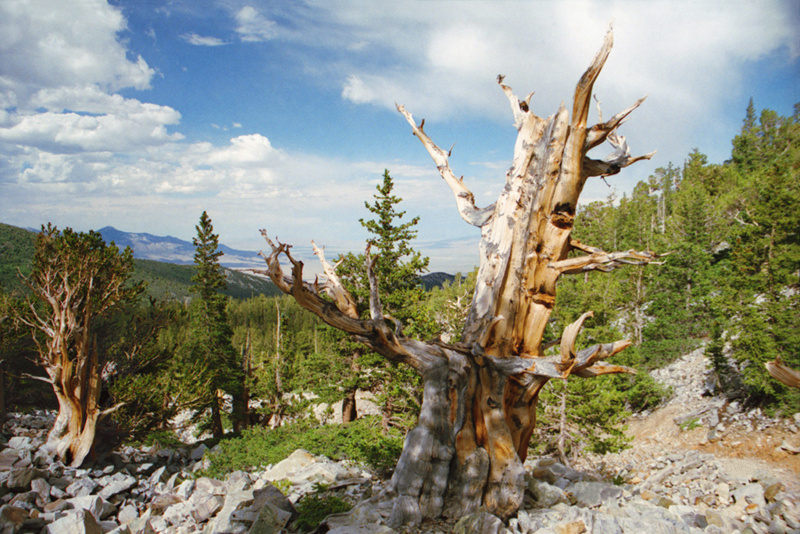
Pinus longaeva

The oldest nonclonal organism ever discovered, a Great Basin bristlecone pine tree at least 5,000 years old, grew at the treeline near Wheeler Peak in the national park. It was cut down in 1964 by a graduate student and U.S. Forest Service personnel for research purposes. It was given the nickname Prometheus, after the mythological figure who stole fire from the gods and gave it to man.

=== Fauna ===
Sixty-one species of mammals, 18 species of reptiles, 238 species of birds, two species of amphibians, and eight species of fish are in Great Basin National Park and the neighboring valleys.

Mammals

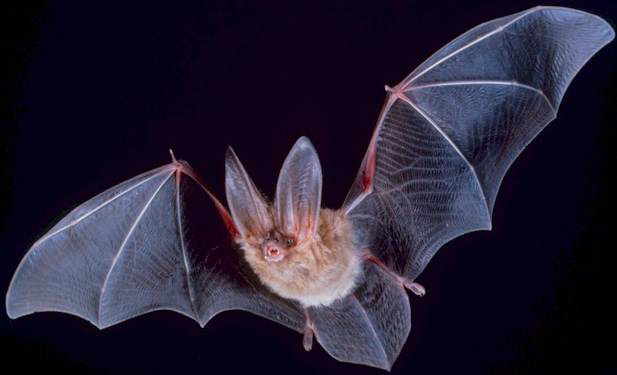
Townsend's big-eared bat

An abundance of wildlife has taken advantage of the habitat zones in Great Basin National Park. Jackrabbits, pygmy rabbits, mountain cottontails, ground squirrels, chipmunks, and various mice live in the low-elevation sagebrush desert. Pronghorns, coyotes, kit foxes, and badgers are less common inhabitants.

In the more rugged areas on the slopes of mountains and in the valley areas nearby, cougars, bobcats, marmots, rock squirrels, and bighorn sheep can occasionally be seen throughout this park. Other animals that can be found here include elk, mule deer, spotted skunks, shrews, ringtail cats, and ermine.

Fish

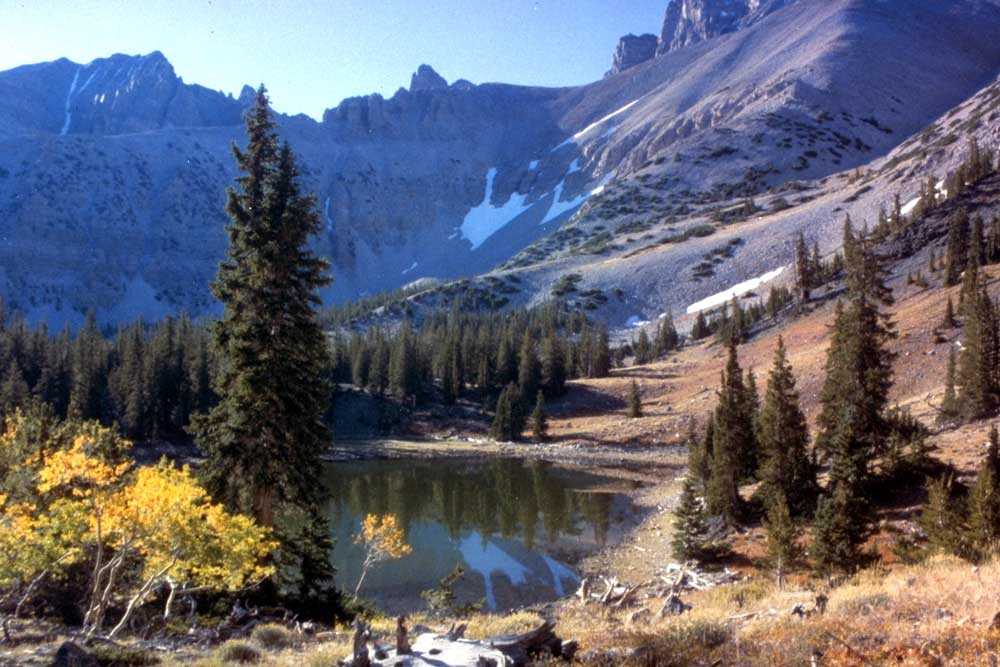
Stella Lake

The Bonneville cutthroat trout is the only fish native to Great Basin National Park. It arrived in the mountain waters naturally and was eventually isolated by changing climatic conditions. Other trout species, such as Lahontan cutthroat trout, rainbow, brook, and brown trout, were stocked in the lakes and streams of the South Snake Range until the park's incorporation in 1986.

Birds

Many species of birds can be found in Great Basin National Park, including Canada geese, hawks, sparrows, bald eagles, tundra swans, barn owls, snow geese, killdeer, golden eagles, woodpeckers, mallards, wrens, greater roadrunners, chickadees, great horned owls, ravens, magpies, and swallows.

Amphibians

Only two species of amphibians have been positively identified in the southern Snake Range and adjacent portions of Snake and Spring Valleys: the western spadefoot toad (Spea hammondii) and the leopard frog (Rana pipiens).

== Geology ==
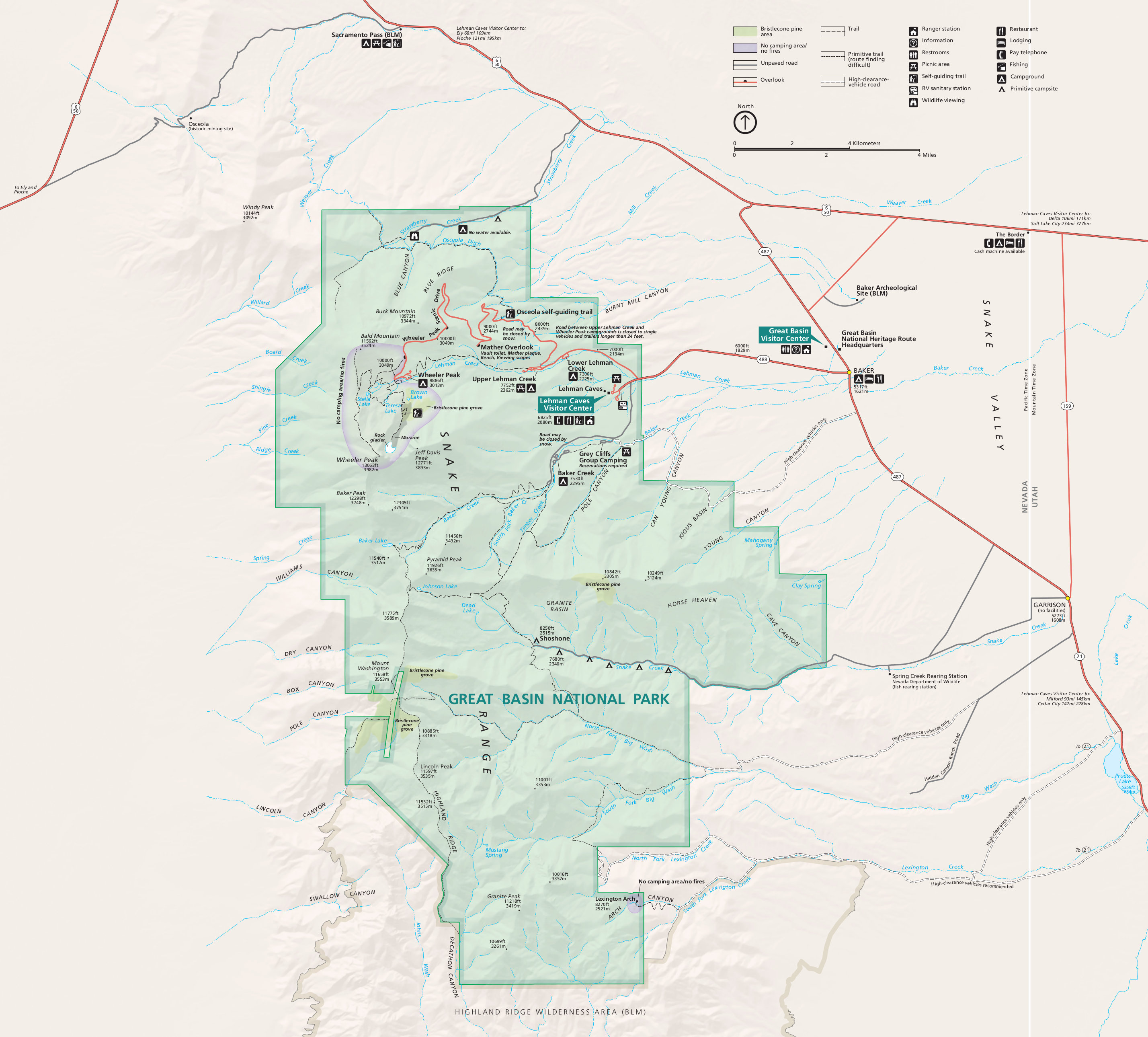
Park map (click map to enlarge)

Many of the rocks were formed during the Cambrian, when the region lay at the edge of a continental landmass called Laurentia. These rocks include the Cambrian strata. As the Paleozoic era progressed, several intensified geologic events occurred, including repeated episodes of faulting, and in turn, orogenies which involved upward lifting of a metamorphic core complex, creating mafic and rhyolitic dikes and sills.

Extensive volcanism also occurred during the middle to late Cambrian, contributing further to the uplift of the area. This also contributed to a second round of block faulting, in which conglomerates, ash flows, and tuffs accumulated in the Snake Range.

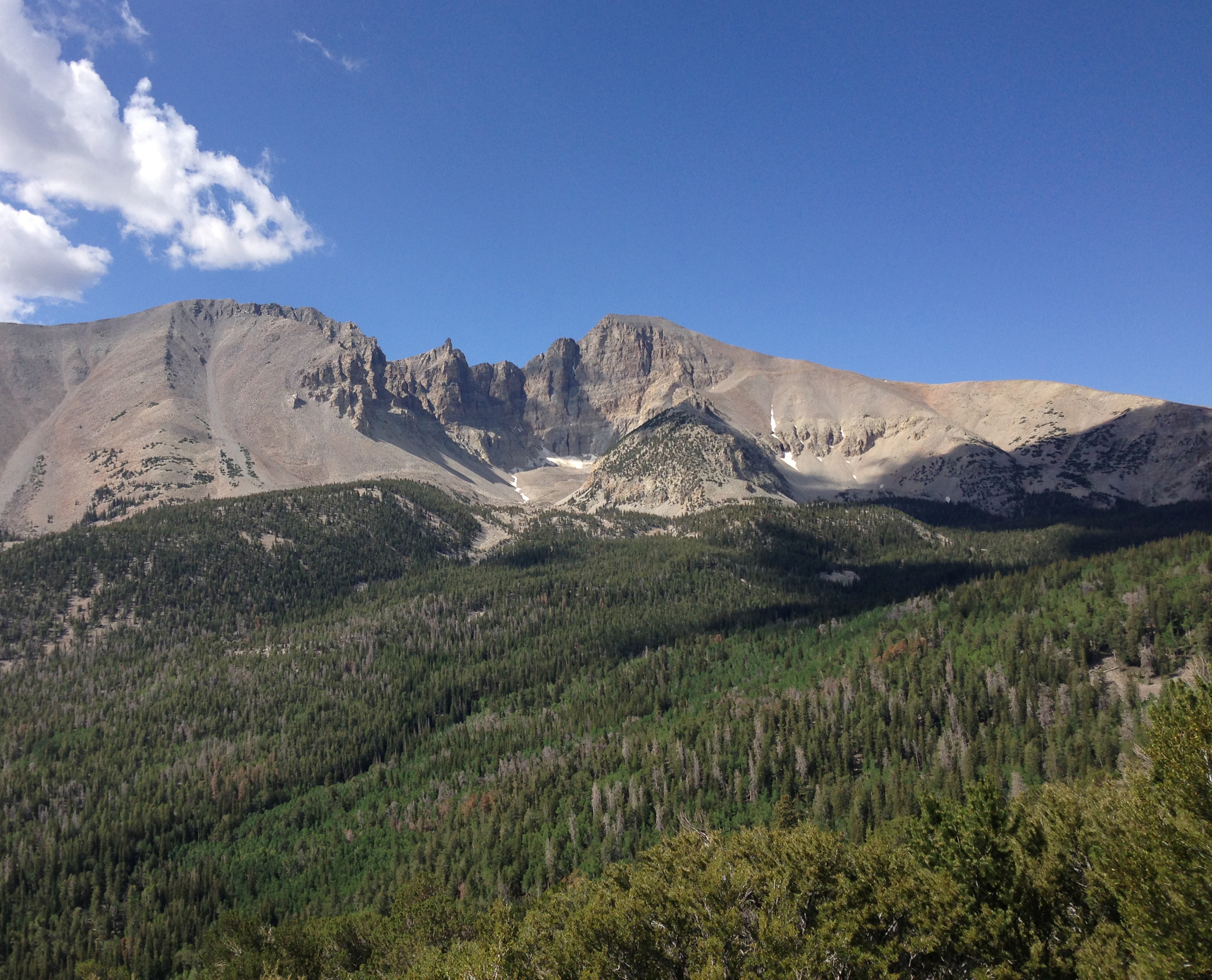
Wheeler Peak

Both continuous and intermittent fault movements also occurred, with individual fault surfaces on both sides of the Snake Range thinning and stretching.

Glaciation

Glaciation, mostly during a series of ice ages in the Pleistocene, heavily eroded the peaks of the Snake Range, leaving canyon walls, U-shaped valleys, cirques, and moraines throughout the range.

Lehman Caves

The Lehman Cave system began forming around 550 million years ago (during the Cambrian), while it was still submerged in a relatively warm, shallow ocean. The caves are made up of a marble and limestone solution, for the most part, that forms the many cave decorations throughout the caverns.

The cave system became much deeper during the Pleistocene, when a prolonged and increased flow of water eroded through the cave's fracturing bedrock. Eventually, the water level dropped, leaving glare rooms and cavities in the rock, creating the depths of the Lehman Caves system.

== Scenic features ==
The park's scenic features include Lexington Arch, the Lehman Orchard and Aqueduct, Rhodes Cabin, Stella and Teresa Lakes, and Wheeler Peak Glacier.

=== Lehman Caves ===
39°00′20″N 114°13′13″W

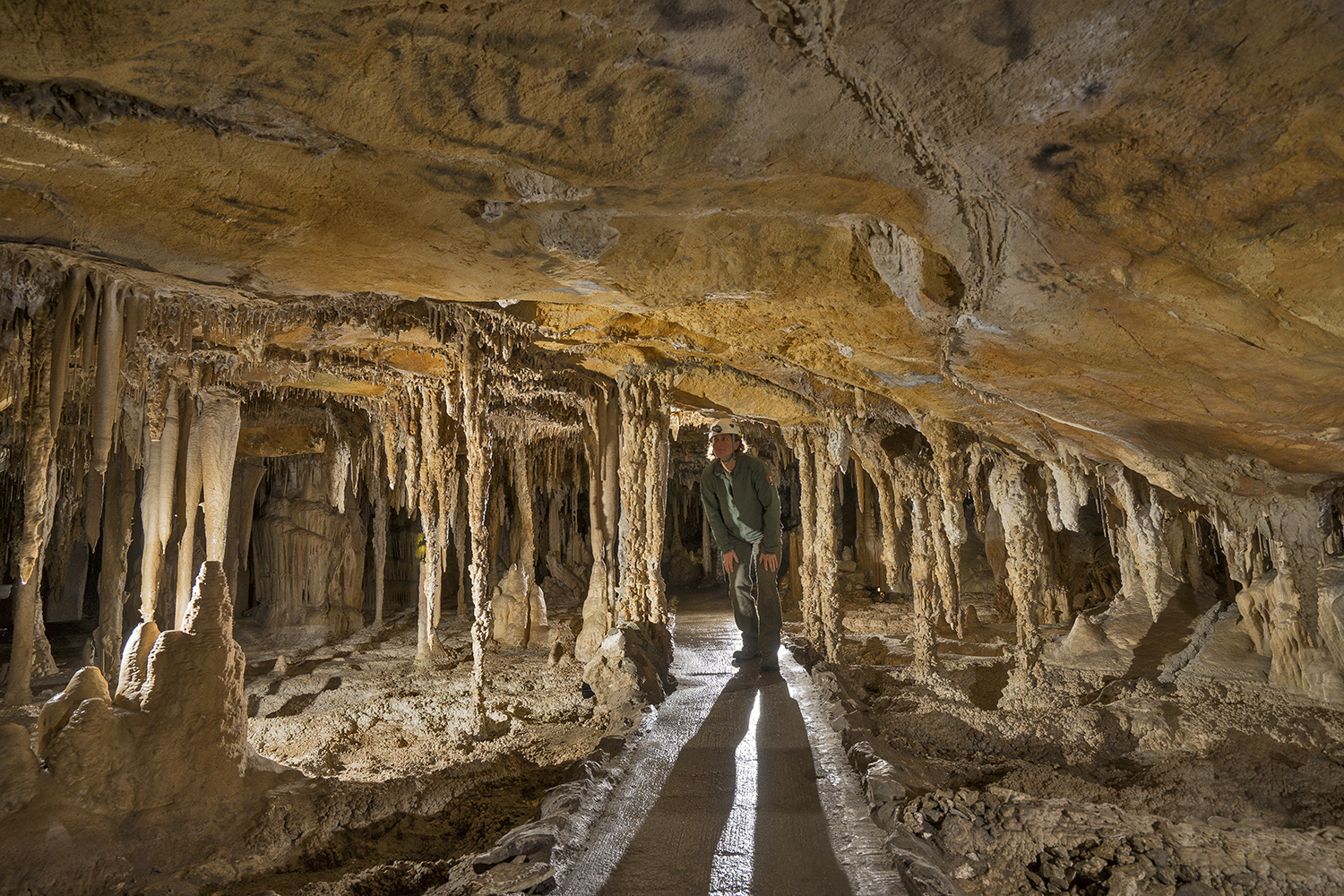
The "Cypress Swamp" along the tourist trail in Lehman Cave

The Lehman Caves were originally protected as a national monument in 1922, which was combined with the national park in 1986. The cave is about two miles long, making it the longest known cave in Nevada. The park offers two different tours of the cave: a 0.6-mile long tour which lasts approximately 90 minutes and a 0.4 mile tour which lasts approximately 60 minutes.

The cave had been known to indigenous peoples long before the arrival of Europeans. In 1885, Absalom Lehman, a rancher in the area, began guiding tours into the cave. Visitors' inscriptions in the cave from the era before it became a National Monument note its use and popularity among recent settlers to the region.

Several species occupy the Lehman Caves. Bacteria are the most common. Crickets, spiders, pseudoscorpions, mites, and springtails may live their full lifecycles in the cave. They are dependent on organic material packed in by other animals or washed in from the surface.

Other animals use the cave, but must leave to forage for food. These include chipmunks, mice, pack rats, and several species of bats. Only insectivorous bats occur in the Great Basin. At least 10 species of bats have been found in the vicinity of Great Basin National Park, including the Townsend's big-eared bat.

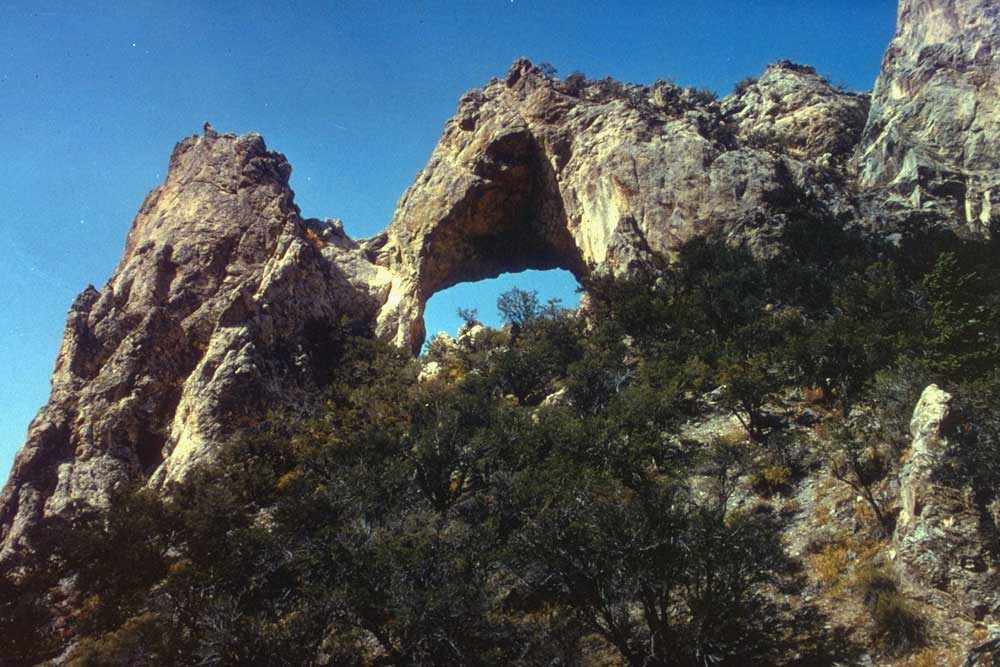
Lexington Arch 38°50′39″N 114°12′30″W is 13 miles from Utah State Route 21 and one of the largest limestone arches in the western United States.

=== Trails ===
The park has 12 trails ranging from 0.3 to 13.1 miles (0.5 to 21.1 km). Trails range from short nature trails at 6,825 feet (2,080 m) (Mountain View Nature Trail), to the Wheeler summit trail starting at 10,160 feet (3,097 m). The Wheeler Summit trail is quite strenuous, and the altitude presents significant hazards for unprepared or inexperienced hikers. Backcountry routes are occasionally maintained throughout the more remote southern portion of the park. A number of these trailheads are accessible by the road that terminates at the primitive Shoshone campground.

=== Visitor centers ===
The Great Basin visitor center is located on Nevada State Route 487 in the town of Baker. The Lehman Caves visitor center is located on Nevada State Route 488, about 5.5 miles (8.9 km) from Baker, 1/2 mile (800 m) inside the park boundary. The Forgotten Winchester, a rifle manufactured in 1882 that was found leaning against a juniper tree in the park in 2014, is on display inside the Great Basin visitor center. Both centers feature exhibits about the park's geology and natural and cultural history, as well as theaters with orientation films.

== Climate ==
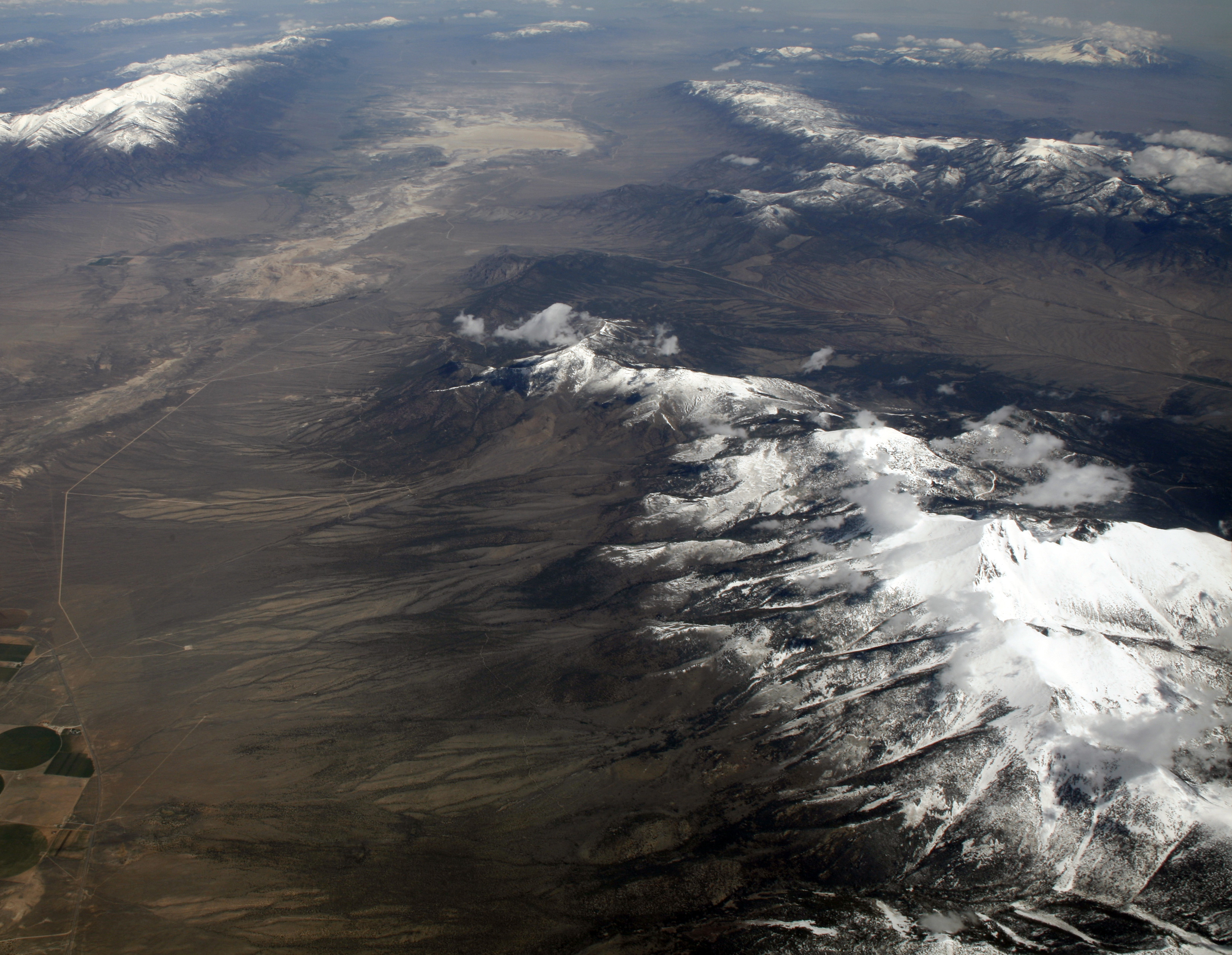
Wheeler Peak and the Snake Range

According to the Köppen climate classification system, Great Basin National Park has a warm-summer humid continental climate (Dfb). The plant hardiness zone at Lehman Caves Visitor Center is 6b with an average annual extreme minimum temperature of −3.8 °F (−19.9 °C).

The park lies in an arid region and receives very little rainfall during most of the year. Most precipitation is winter snow or summer thunderstorms. All precipitation in this region evaporates, sinks underground, or flows into lakes — i.e., it is endorheic. No water reaches the ocean.

Winters are cool and summers are mild to hot. Weather can change quickly, especially in the back country or on Wheeler Peak at high elevations. Lehman Caves maintain a fairly constant temperature of 50 °F (10 °C) with 90% humidity year round. The climate varies throughout the park, depending on elevation and location. The following data are for the Lehman Caves Visitor Center only. Higher elevations are cooler and receive more precipitation, whereas lower elevations are hotter and drier.

Climate data for Great Basin National Park, Nevada, 1991–2020 normals, extremes 1937–present
Month	Jan	Feb	Mar	Apr	May	Jun	Jul	Aug	Sep	Oct	Nov	Dec	Year
Record high °F (°C)	67 (19)	68 (20)	74 (23)	81 (27)	91 (33)	100 (38)	100 (38)	97 (36)	93 (34)	85 (29)	78 (26)	67 (19)	100 (38)
Mean maximum °F (°C)	55.3 (12.9)	56.9 (13.8)	64.9 (18.3)	72.8 (22.7)	81.4 (27.4)	89.2 (31.8)	93.8 (34.3)	90.9 (32.7)	85.6 (29.8)	76.2 (24.6)	65.2 (18.4)	57.8 (14.3)	94.3 (34.6)
Mean daily maximum °F (°C)	39.5 (4.2)	40.6 (4.8)	48.3 (9.1)	55.3 (12.9)	64.3 (17.9)	76.2 (24.6)	84.6 (29.2)	82.8 (28.2)	73.4 (23.0)	60.1 (15.6)	47.5 (8.6)	39.6 (4.2)	59.3 (15.2)
Daily mean °F (°C)	29.6 (−1.3)	30.6 (−0.8)	37.6 (3.1)	43.6 (6.4)	52.3 (11.3)	62.8 (17.1)	71.4 (21.9)	69.3 (20.7)	60.6 (15.9)	48.2 (9.0)	36.8 (2.7)	29.5 (−1.4)	47.7 (8.7)
Mean daily minimum °F (°C)	19.7 (−6.8)	20.6 (−6.3)	27.0 (−2.8)	31.9 (−0.1)	40.2 (4.6)	49.4 (9.7)	58.1 (14.5)	55.9 (13.3)	47.7 (8.7)	36.3 (2.4)	26.1 (−3.3)	19.5 (−6.9)	36.0 (2.2)
Mean minimum °F (°C)	2.6 (−16.3)	5.7 (−14.6)	13.3 (−10.4)	19.4 (−7.0)	26.3 (−3.2)	34.0 (1.1)	48.1 (8.9)	45.9 (7.7)	33.1 (0.6)	21.1 (−6.1)	8.4 (−13.1)	3.2 (−16.0)	−1.2 (−18.4)
Record low °F (°C)	−20 (−29)	−15 (−26)	−2 (−19)	10 (−12)	6 (−14)	14 (−10)	32 (0)	32 (0)	10 (−12)	2 (−17)	−6 (−21)	−19 (−28)	−20 (−29)
Average precipitation inches (mm)	1.30 (33)	1.49 (38)	1.21 (31)	1.57 (40)	1.25 (32)	1.10 (28)	0.90 (23)	1.22 (31)	1.08 (27)	1.28 (33)	0.86 (22)	0.99 (25)	14.25 (362)
Average snowfall inches (cm)	12.3 (31)	20.7 (53)	7.3 (19)	7.2 (18)	0.7 (1.8)	0.0 (0.0)	0.0 (0.0)	0.0 (0.0)	0.0 (0.0)	2.0 (5.1)	6.9 (18)	9.6 (24)	66.7 (169)
Average extreme snow depth inches (cm)	11.7 (30)	13.4 (34)	8.5 (22)	3.7 (9.4)	0.7 (1.8)	0.0 (0.0)	0.0 (0.0)	0.0 (0.0)	0.0 (0.0)	1.3 (3.3)	4.4 (11)	9.7 (25)	17.0 (43)
Average precipitation days (≥ 0.01 in)	6.5	7.1	6.7	6.8	7.6	4.7	7.3	7.3	5.8	5.6	5.5	6.3	77.2
Average snowy days (≥ 0.1 in)	4.7	5.6	3.8	2.1	0.4	0.0	0.0	0.0	0.0	0.8	2.7	4.6	24.7
Source: NOAA

== See also ==
- Great Basin National Heritage Area
- List of national parks of the United States
