= Lincoln County Courthouse =

Lincoln County Courthouse may refer to:

- Lincoln County Courthouse (Arkansas), Star City, Arkansas, listed on the National Register of Historic Places (NRHP)
- Lincoln County Courthouse (Georgia), Lincolnton, Georgia, NRHP-listed
- Lincoln County Courthouse (Kansas), Lincoln, Kansas, NRHP-listed
- Lincoln County Courthouse (Kentucky), Stanford, Kentucky, NRHP-listed
- Lincoln County Courthouse (Wiscasset, Maine), part of the NRHP-listed Wiscasset Historic District
- Pownalborough Courthouse, Dresden, Maine, Lincoln County's first courthouse
- Lincoln County Courthouse and Jail, in Ivanhoe, Minnesota, NRHP-listed in Lincoln County
- Lincoln County Courthouse (Nebraska), North Platte, Nebraska, NRHP-listed
- 1938 Lincoln County Courthouse, Pioche, Nevada, NRHP-listed
- Lincoln County Courthouse (1872), Pioche, Nevada, NRHP-listed
- Lincoln County Courthouse (North Carolina), Lincolnton, North Carolina, NRHP-listed
- Lincoln County Courthouse (Wisconsin), Merrill, Wisconsin, NRHP-listed
- Lincoln County Courthouse (Wyoming), Kemmerer, Wyoming, NRHP-listed
