= Nevada State Route 894 =

Highway in Nevada

State Route 894
- Shoshone Road
- SR 894 highlighted in red

Route information
- Maintained by NDOT
- Length: 16.617 mi (26.742 km)

Major junctions
- South end: Shoshone
- North end: US 93 southeast of Majors Place

Location
- Country: United States
- State: Nevada
- Counties: White Pine

Highway system
- Nevada State Highway System; Interstate; US; State; Pre‑1976; Scenic
| ← SR 893 | → SR 895 |

State Route 894 (SR 894), also known as Shoshone Road, is a state highway in southeastern White Pine County, Nevada, United States.

== Route description ==
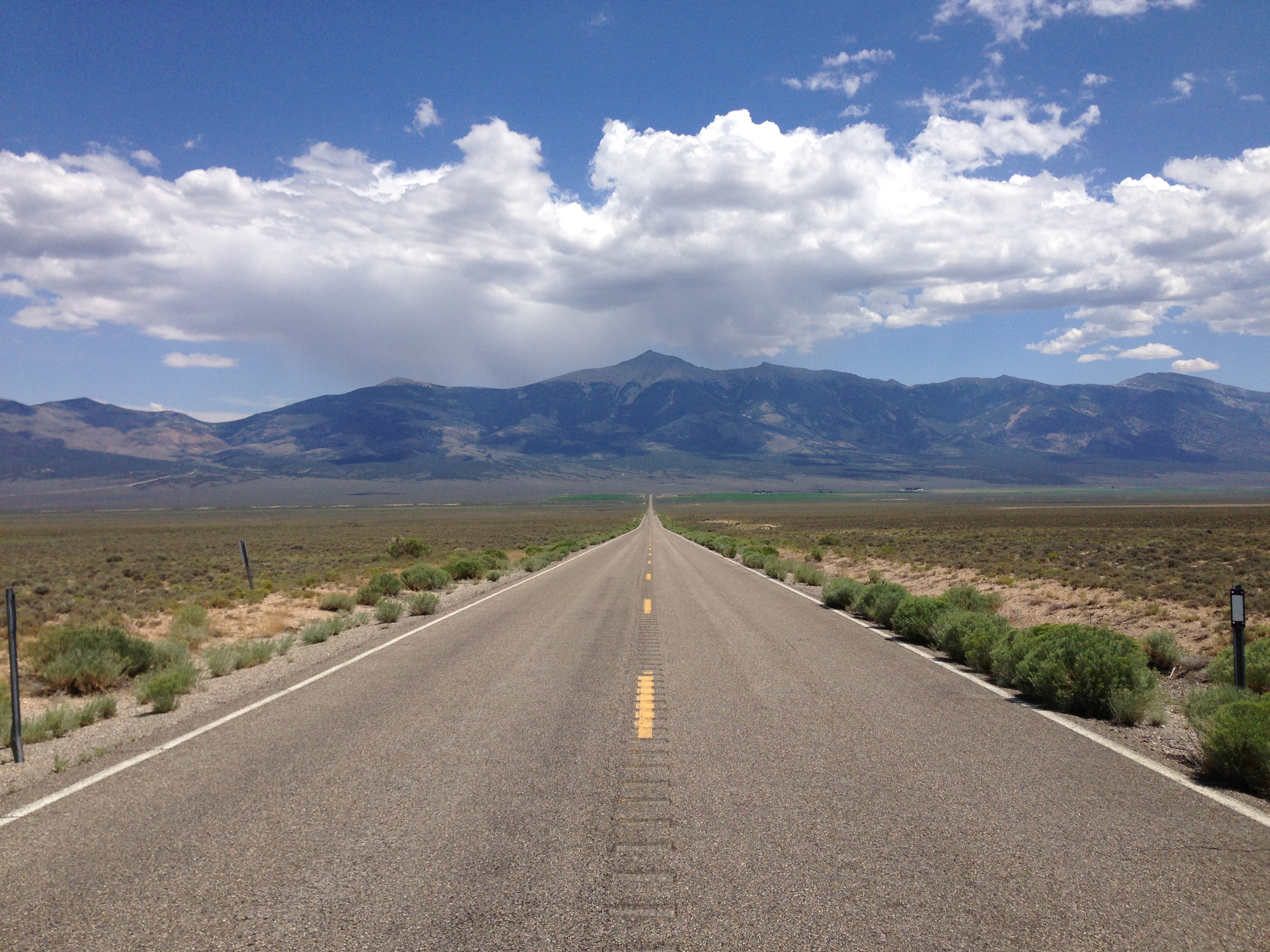
View east along southbound SR 894, with Wheeler Peak directly ahead, August 2014

SR 894 beings at the northern end of Indian Springs Fence Line Road in Shoshone, in an area of the unincorporated community that was formerly the separate unincorporated community of Minerva. (Indian Indian Springs Fence Line Road heads south–southeasterly as a dirt road for about 16 miles [26 km] to end at a junction with several other roads at The Troughs.)

From its southern terminus, SR 894 heads nearly due north on Shoshone Road (a two-lane asphalt paved road) for about 5 miles (8.0 km) before assuming a north-northwesterly course. About 6 miles (9.7 km) later, after crossing the Spring and Ridge creeks, SR 894 turns to head due west. After about 5.4 more miles (8.7 km), it reaches its northern terminus at a T intersection with U.S. Route 93 (US 93) about 4 miles (6.4 km) southeast of the unincorporated community of Majors Place. (US 93 heads south to Pioche, Caliente, and Las Vegas; and heads north to a junction with US 6/US 50 at Majors Place en route to Ely.)

The entire highway is located on Baking Powder Flat, a flat in the southern part of the Spring Valley. It has multiple named and unnamed minor side and cross roads, but no major intersections.

== Major intersections ==
The entire route is in White Pine County.

| Location | mi | km | Destinations | Notes |
|---|---|---|---|---|
| Shoshone | 0.000 | 0.000 | Southern terminus; continuation beyond southern terminus as a dirt road | |
| | 16.617 | 26.742 | US 93 (Great Basin Highway) – Las Vegas, Ely | Northern terminus |
1.000 mi = 1.609 km; 1.000 km = 0.621 mi: Route transition
