= U.S. Route 93 Alternate (Nevada) =

Highway in Nevada

U.S. Route 93 Alternate
- US 93 Alternate, highlighted in red

Route information
- Auxiliary route of US 93
- Maintained by NDOT
- Length: 117 mi (188 km) 59.033 miles (95.004 km) independent of I-80
- Existed: November 12, 1976–present

Major junctions
- South end: US 93 in Lages Station
- I-80 in West Wendover
- North end: I-80 / US 93 in Wells

Location
- Country: United States
- State: Nevada
- Counties: White Pine, Elko

Highway system
- United States Numbered Highway System; List; Special; Divided; Nevada State Highway System; Interstate; US; State; Pre‑1976; Scenic

In the U.S. state of Nevada, U.S. Route 93 Alternate (US 93 Alt. or Alt 93) is an alternate route of U.S. Route 93 located in the northeast part of the state. It connects Lages Station to Wells via the town of West Wendover.

== Route description ==
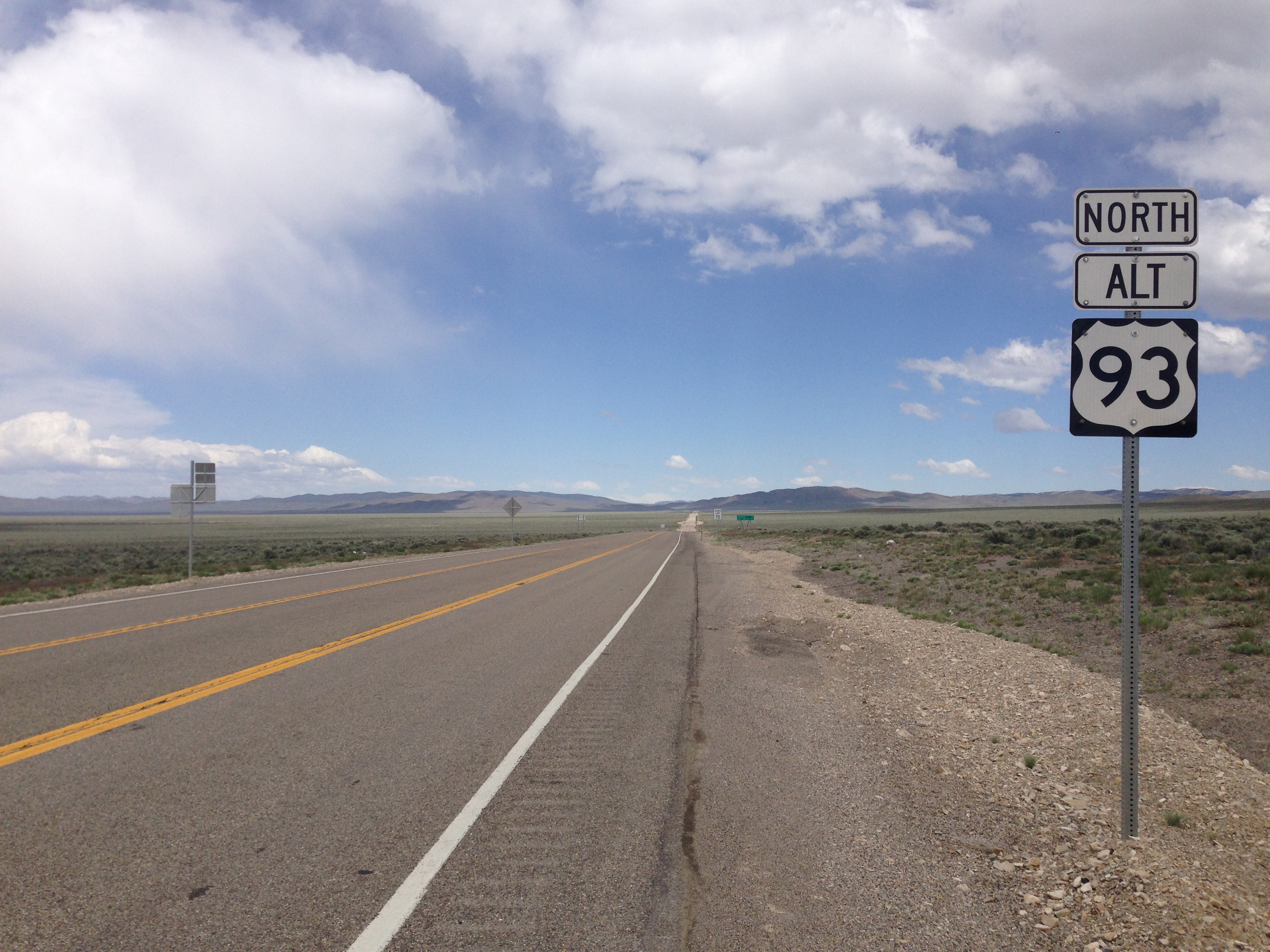
View north from the south end of US 93 Alt. at US 93 in Lages Station as seen in 2014

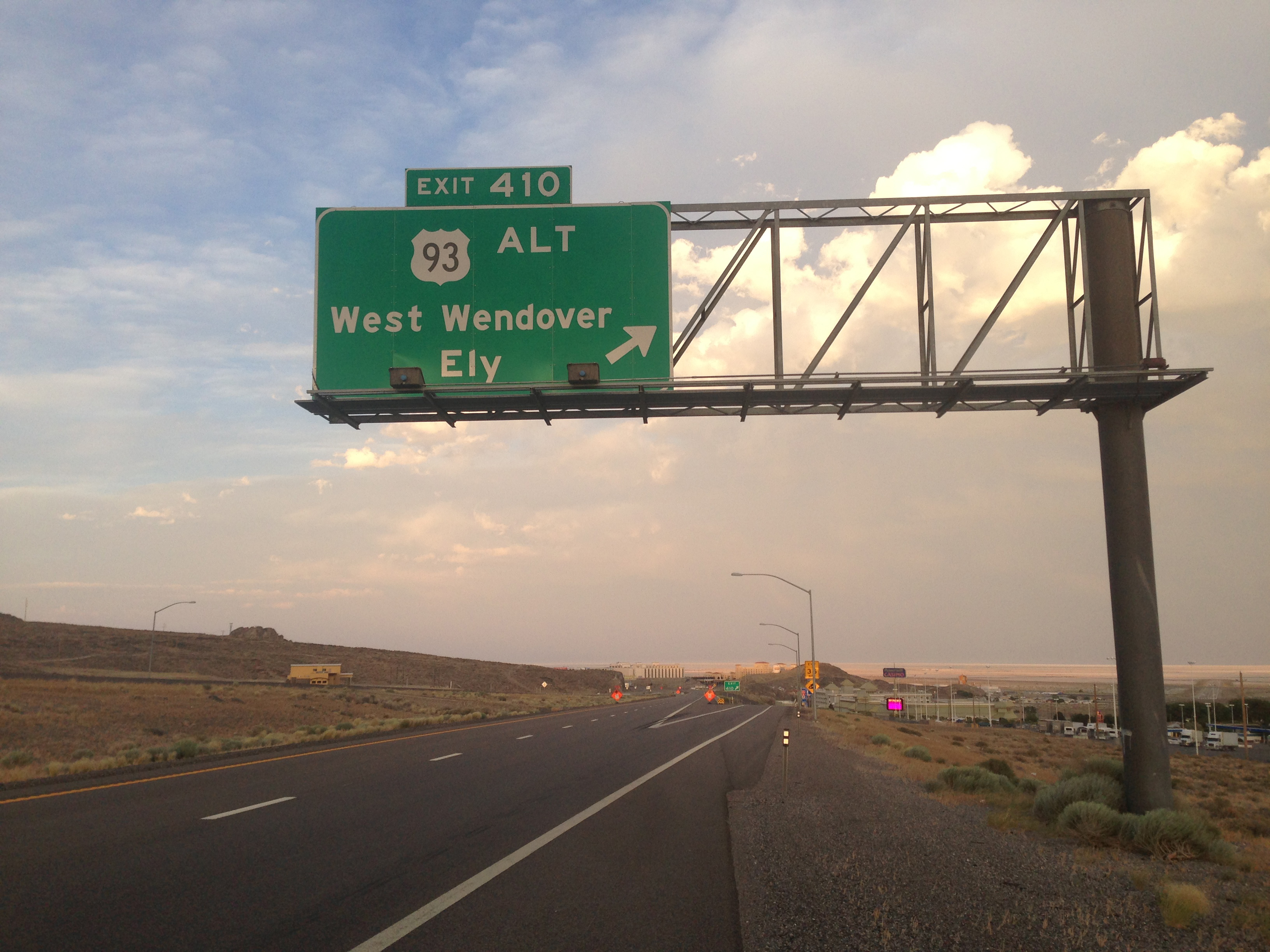
US 93 Alt. splits from I-80 in West Wendover as seen in 2014

US 93 Alt. begins at Lages Station in northern White Pine County. As mainline US 93 proceeds north, Alt 93 heads more northeast, entering Elko County shortly after leaving the junction. The route continues northeast, passing through the Antelope Range and the Goshute Mountains, where it ascends White Horse Pass (elevation 6,031 feet (1,838 m)). Descending the pass, US 93 Alternate turns more northward to follow the base of the Goshute Mountains towards West Wendover.

Entering West Wendover, US 93 Alt. intersects Wendover Boulevard (Interstate 80 Business). The highway follows the business route west and then north approximately 0.28 miles (0.45 km) to intersect Interstate 80. US 93 Alt then joins I-80 and travels west concurrently with the Interstate for 59 miles (95 km). US 93 Alt. comes to an end in the city of Wells, reuniting with mainline US 93 at the I-80 East Wells interchange (exit 352).

== History ==
US 93 Alt. has origins dating back to the early auto trails. The portion of the route between Lages Station and West Wendover was originally part of the Lincoln Highway, the first road across America. This segment was originally designated as a portion of US 50. When the US highway system was developed in 1926 the routing of US 50 followed what is now US 93 between Ely and Lages Station and then continued on to West Wendover. From there, it followed US 40 (now Interstate 80) east across the Great Salt Lake Desert in Utah, through Salt Lake City, south along US 91 (now Interstate 15) to Provo, Utah. This designation remained until approximately 1952, when it was redesignated US 50 Alternate. Utah decommissioned portions of Alt 50 in 1972.

US 93 Alt. was established by the American Association of State Highway and Transportation Officials (AASHTO) at their annual meeting on November 12, 1976. Action at this meeting eliminated the former Alt 50 designation between Nevada and Utah, applying Alt 93 over the portion of Alt 50 not already overlapping US 93 mainline then returning the new route to the US 93 mainline via Interstate 80. AASHTO approved the route as a "Temporary Alternate". However, the route remains designated today and is not signed as a temporary routing.

== Major intersections ==
Mileposts in Nevada reset at county lines; the start and end mileposts for each county are given in the county column. Mileposts are given only for those portions of US 93 Alt not concurrent with Interstate 80.

County	Location	mi	km	Destinations	Notes
White Pine; 0.00-5.69	Lages Station	0.00	0.00	US 93 – Ely, Wells	Southern terminus
Elko; 0.00-53.51	West Wendover			I-80 BL east (Wendover Boulevard) – Wendover	Southern end of I-80 BL concurrency; former SR 224 east; serves Wendover Airport
Elko; 0.00-53.51	West Wendover	53.51	86.12	I-80 east – Salt Lake City I-80 BL ends	Interchange; northern end of I-80 BL concurrency; southern end of I-80 concurrency; I-80 exit 410
Elko; 0.00-53.51	West Wendover	53.51	86.12	Southern end of freeway	
Elko; 0.00-53.51	West Wendover to Wells			US 93 Alt. concurrent with I-80 (exits 410 to 352)	
Elko; 0.00-53.51	Wells			I-80 west / US 93 – Elko, Reno, Ely, Jackpot	Northern end of I-80 concurrency; northern terminus; I-80 exit 352
1.000 mi = 1.609 km; 1.000 km = 0.621 mi: Concurrency terminus

== See also ==
- List of U.S. Routes in Nevada
