= Nevada State Route 322 =

State highway in Nevada, United States

State Route 322
- Eagle Valley Road; Ursine Road
- SR 322 highlighted in red

Route information
- Maintained by NDOT
- Length: 18.578 mi (29.898 km)
- Existed: 1976–present

Major junctions
- West end: SR 321 in Pioche
- US 93
- East end: Spring Valley State Park entrance

Location
- Country: United States
- State: Nevada

Highway system
- Nevada State Highway System; Interstate; US; State; Pre‑1976; Scenic
← SR 321	→ SR 338

State Route 322 (SR 322) is a state highway in Lincoln County, Nevada. From State Route 321 in Pioche, State Route 322 passes by U.S. Route 93 and heads to the entrance of Spring Valley State Park via the community of Ursine. The route was previously known as State Route 85.

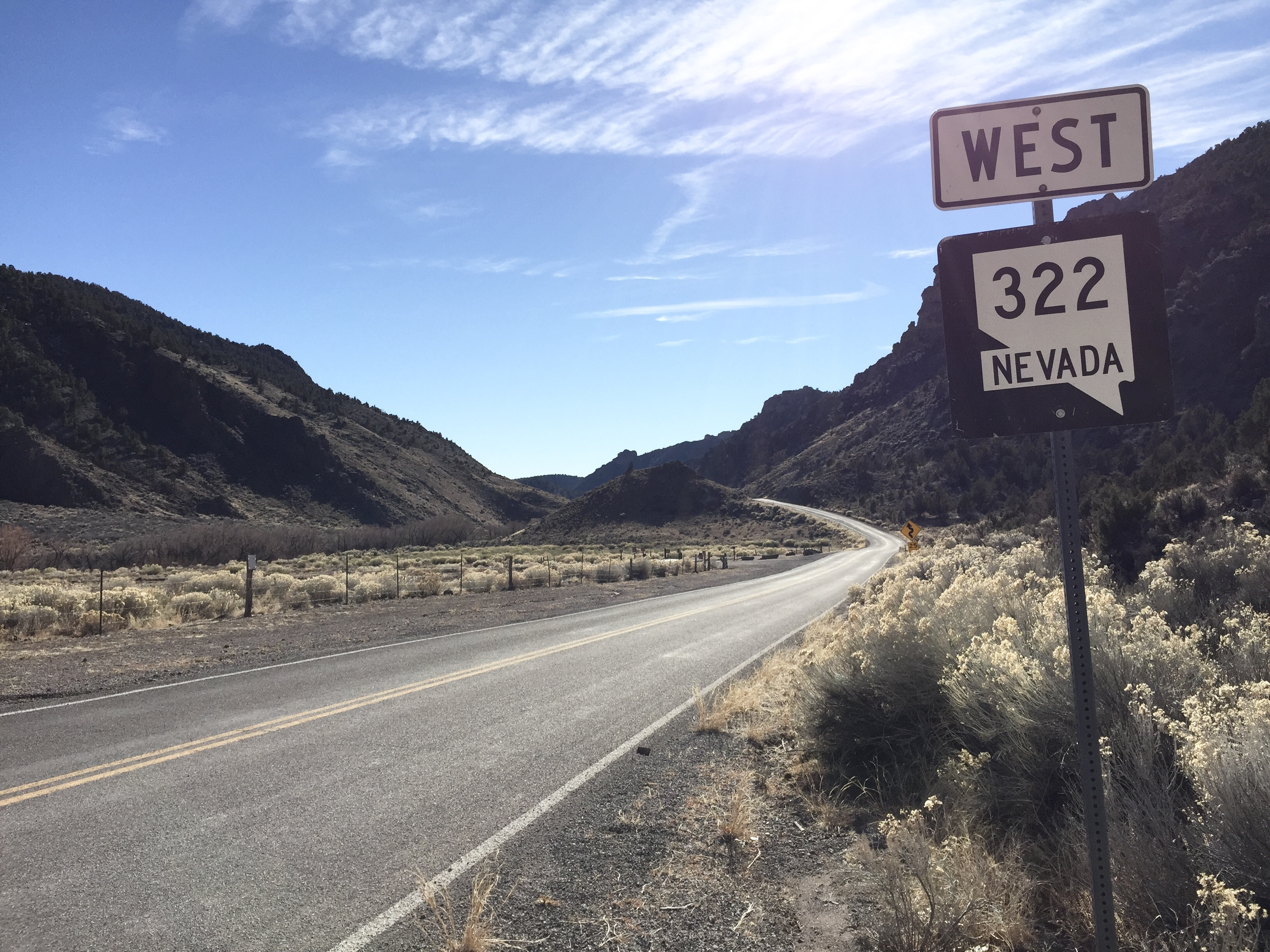
View from the east end of SR 322 looking westbound

== Route description ==
The route begins with an intersection with State Route 321. SR 322 heads northward through town as Main Street. Upon intersecting U.S. Route 93, the route becomes Eagle Valley Road, heading eastward. SR 322 then turns northward, passing briefly through the town of Ursine before meeting its terminus at Spring Valley State Park.

== History ==
The route was the second highway in the state to be known as State Route 85, established in the 1970s. This designation was removed in favor of SR 322 in the 1976 renumbering of Nevada's state highways.

== Major intersections ==
The entire route is in Lincoln County.

Location	mi	km	Destinations	Notes
Pioche			SR 321	
Pioche			US 93 – Caliente, Ely	
			Spring Valley State Park entrance	
			Camp Valley Road	Continuation beyond Spring Valley State Park
1.000 mi = 1.609 km; 1.000 km = 0.621 mi
