= Nevada State Route 93 =

U.S. Route 93 in Nevada

Nevada State Route 93 (1960s)

Nevada State Route 93

Nevada State Route 93 may refer to:

- U.S. Route 93 in Nevada
- Nevada State Route 93 (1960s), which existed until the 1970s renumbering
