= Nevada State Route 321 =

State highway in Nevada, United States

State Route 321
- Pioche Road
- SR 321 highlighted in red

Route information
- Maintained by NDOT
- Length: 5.113 mi (8.229 km)
- Existed: 1976–present

Major junctions
- South end: US 93 south of Pioche
- North end: US 93 north of Pioche

Location
- Country: United States
- State: Nevada

Highway system
- Nevada State Highway System; Interstate; US; State; Pre‑1976; Scenic
← SR 320	→ SR 322

State Route 321 (SR 321) is a state highway in Lincoln County, Nevada, serving the town of Pioche.

== Route description ==
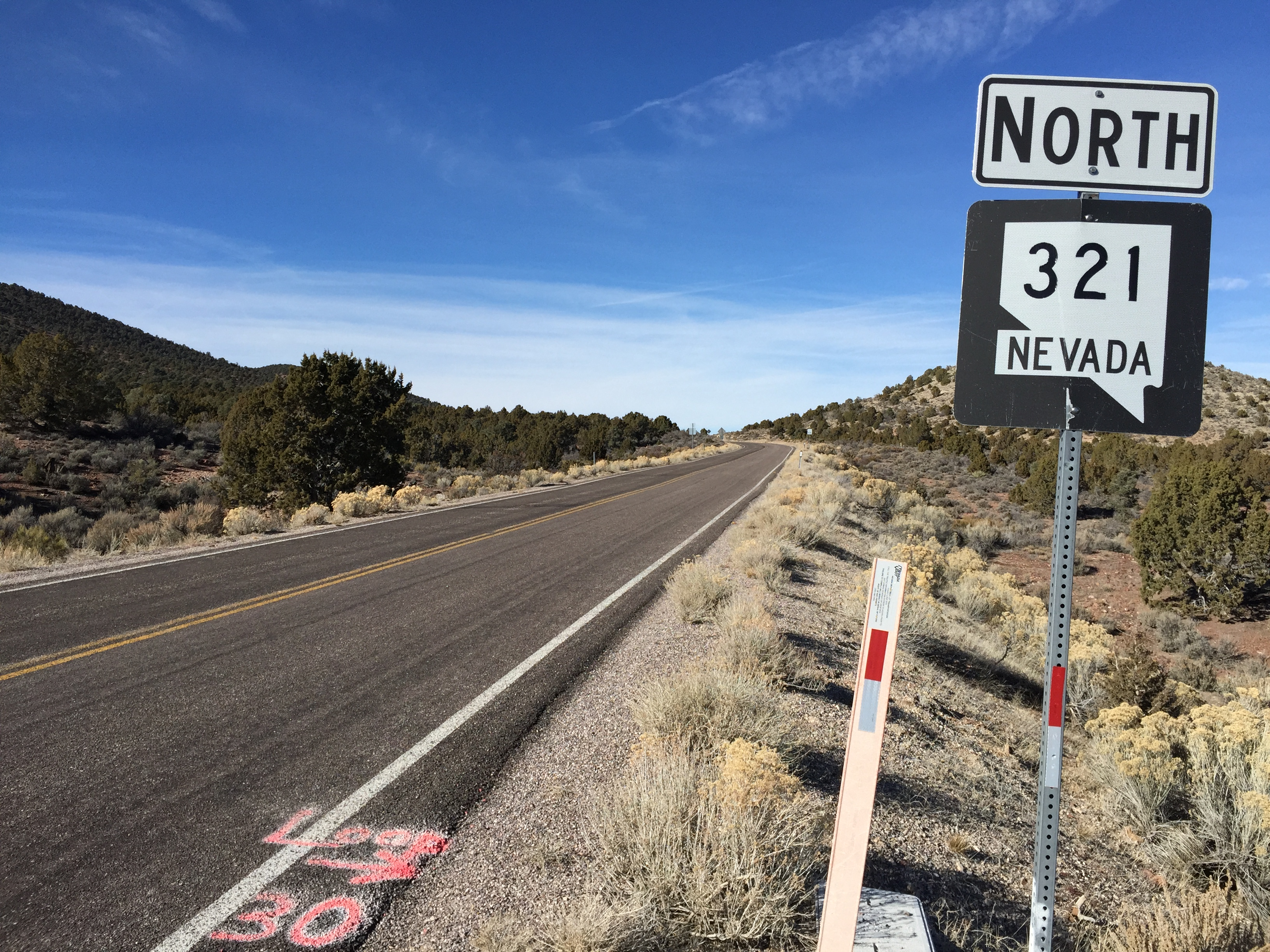
View from the south end of SR 321 looking northbound

This loop route connects to U.S. Route 93 (US 93) on both sides via the town of Pioche. Another nearby loop route of US 93, State Route 320, bypasses Pioche altogether and instead serves the Caselton Mine. Within Pioche, State Route 321 serves as the terminus for State Route 322.

== Major intersections ==
The entire route is in Lincoln County.

Location	mi	km	Destinations	Notes
			US 93	
Pioche			SR 322 east – Ursine	
			US 93	
1.000 mi = 1.609 km; 1.000 km = 0.621 mi
