= Dutch John Mountain =

Dutch John Mountain may refer to:

- Dutch John Mountain (Nevada), along the Great Basin Highway (38.44001°N 114.677396°W)
- Dutch John Mountain (Utah), near Daggett, Utah (40.961627°N 109.397358°W)
