= U.S. Route 93 in Nevada =

Section of U.S. Numbered Highway in Nevada, United States

U.S. Route 93
- Great Basin Highway
- US 93 highlighted in red

Route information
- Maintained by NDOT
- Length: 527 mi (848 km) 437.200 mi (703.605 km) separate from other routes
- Existed: November 11, 1926–present

Major junctions
- South end: Future I-11 / US 93 at the Arizona state line near Boulder City
- US 95 / SR 173 in Boulder City; I-215 / SR 564 in Henderson; I-11 / US 95 / I-15 in Las Vegas; Future I-215 / CC 215 in North Las Vegas; I-15 in North Las Vegas; US 6 / US 50 from Majors Place to Ely; US 93 Alt. in Lages Station; I-80 / US 93 Alt. in Wells
- North end: US 93 at the Idaho state line in Jackpot

Location
- Country: United States
- State: Nevada
- Counties: Clark, Lincoln, White Pine, Elko

Highway system
- United States Numbered Highway System; List; Special; Divided; Nevada State Highway System; Interstate; US; State; Pre‑1976; Scenic
← SR 88	→ US 95

In the U.S. state of Nevada, U.S. Route 93 (US 93) is a major United States Numbered Highway traversing the eastern edge of the state. The highway connects the Las Vegas area to the Great Basin National Park, and provides further connections to Ely and Wells. US 93 also provides the majority of the most direct connection from the major metropolitan areas of Las Vegas and Phoenix (via Boulder City, Kingman and Wickenburg with a final link to Phoenix via US 60) to the Boise, Idaho metropolitan area (with a final connection to Boise via Interstate 84 from Twin Falls, Idaho).

== Route description ==
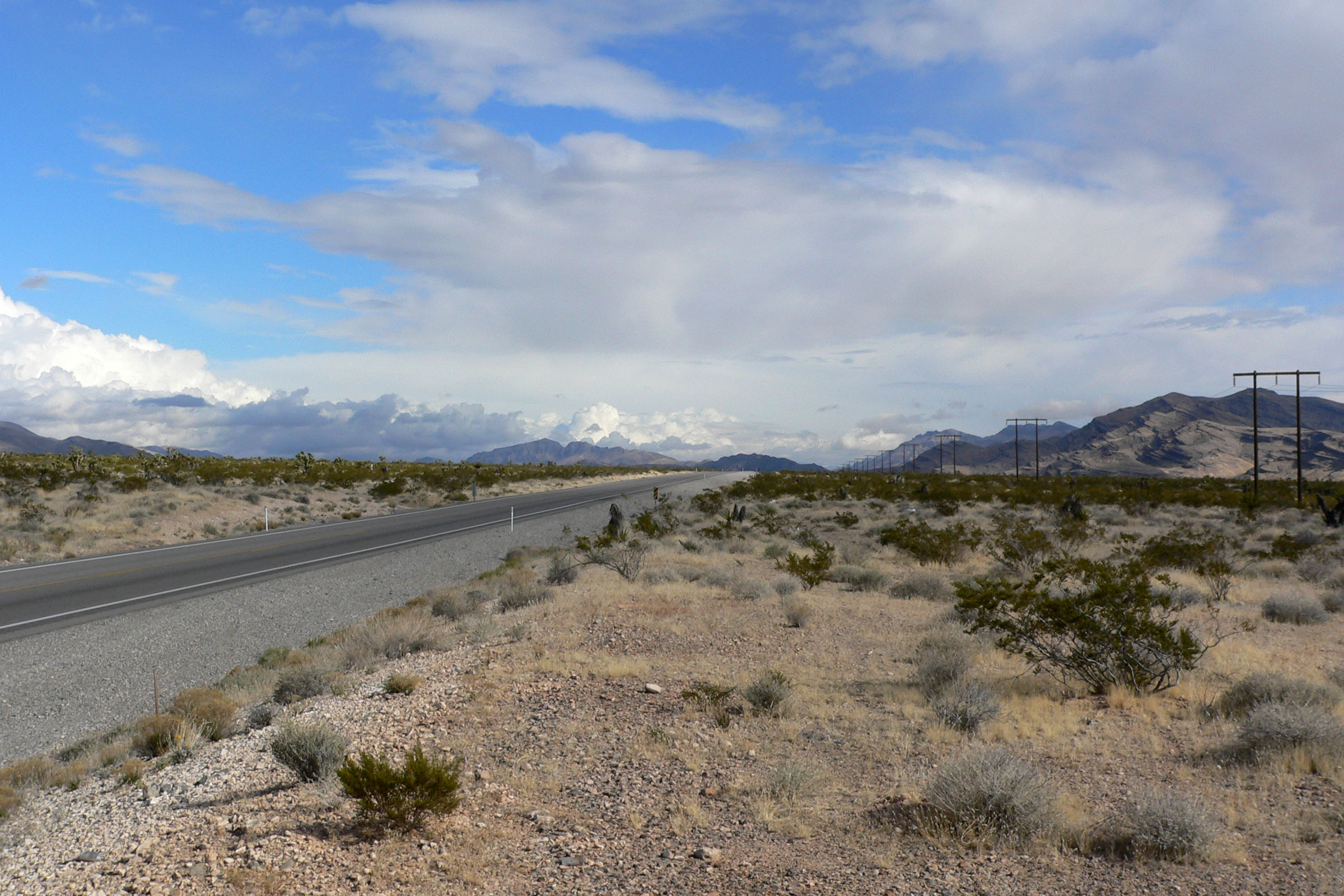
Near Interstate 15, looking north as seen in 2006

U.S. Route 93 in Nevada is known as the Great Basin Highway from Interstate 15 in North Las Vegas to Interstate 80 in Wells. It begins at the Mike O'Callaghan–Pat Tillman Memorial Bridge in Boulder City, concurrent with Interstate 11. U.S. Route 95 joins the two routes from State Route 173 in Boulder City to Interstate 15 in downtown Las Vegas. They run to the Las Vegas Valley, passing through the cities of Henderson, Las Vegas, and North Las Vegas. At the Spaghetti Bowl, US 93 leaves I-11 and merges with Interstate 15. They then head northeast for approximately 21 miles (34 km). At exit 64, US 93 heads northwest toward Alamo.

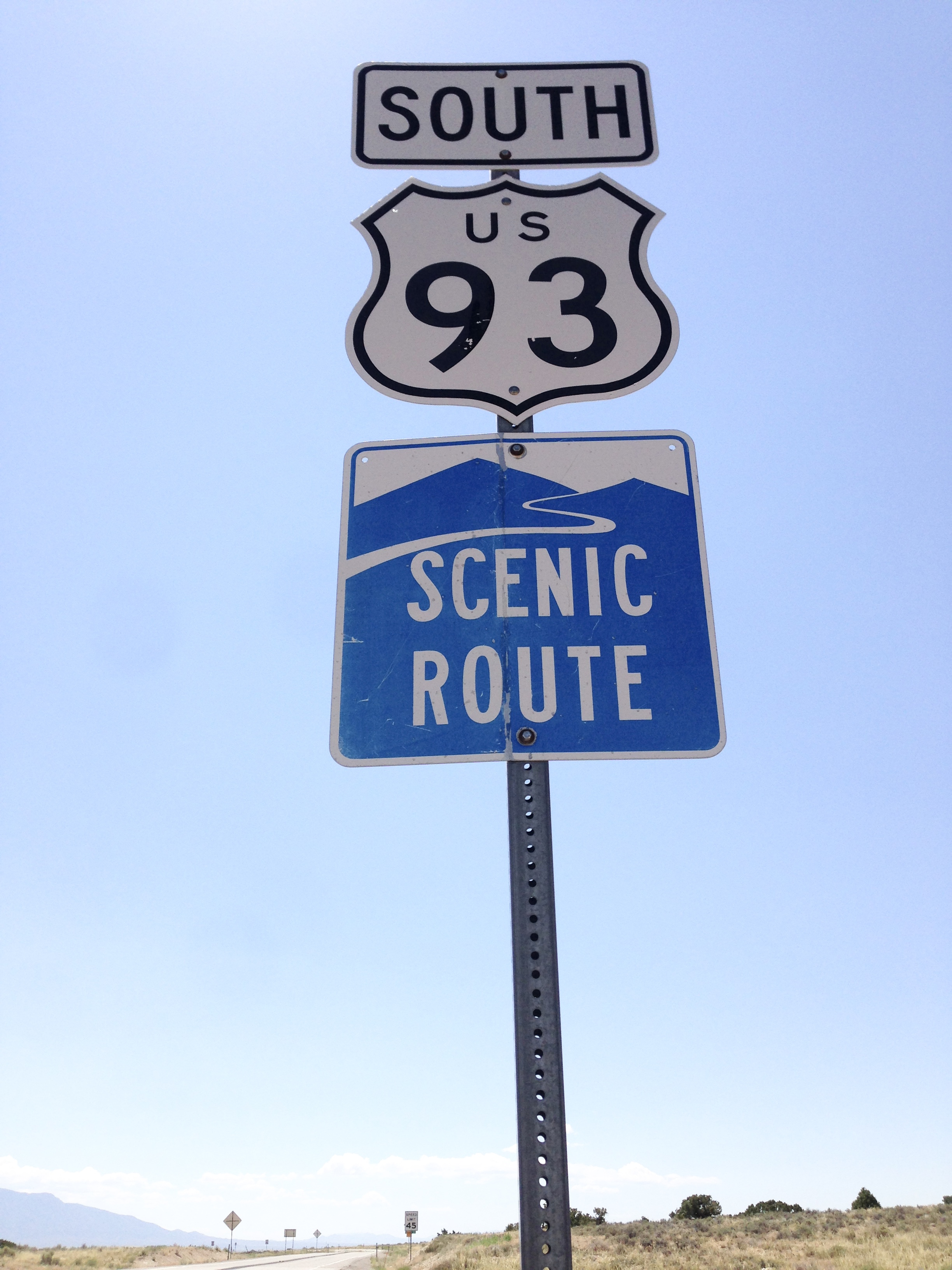
Signage along the Scenic Byway section of US 93, as seen in 2014

Near Crystal Springs, US 93 curves right while intersecting State Routes 318 and 375. US 93 continues east to mountainous terrain to the town of Caliente. The highway turns left to go north to Pioche. 80 miles (130 km) later, the highway turns left at an intersection with U.S. Routes 6 and 50. From State Route 318 to the US Routes 6 and 50 intersection, the highway is a Nevada Scenic Byway. Near Ely, the three U.S. routes separate. US 6 turns left before the intersection US 50 and 93 separate, heading southwest. US 50 and 93 separate, with route 50 heading northwest towards Austin, Nevada and route 93 heading northeast.

At Lages Station, US 93 turns left, while US 93 Alternate continues straight. In Wells, US 93 intersects Interstate 80. The highway continues into Idaho after passing through Jackpot. Between Ely and Wells, there are no services for 136 miles (219 km).

== History ==
=== Establishment ===
U.S. Route 93 was not one of the original U.S. highways proposed in the 1925 Bureau of Public Roads plan. However, the revised numbering plan approved by the American Association of State Highway Officials (AASHO) on November 11, 1926 established US 93 from the Canada–US border near Eureka, Montana south through Montana and Idaho to a southern terminus at Wells, Nevada. The establishment of the highway was reflected on Nevada's 1927 official highway map. The Nevada section was approximately 70 miles (110 km), commissioned along what was then the northern portion of State Route 13.

AASHO, at its June 8, 1931 meeting, approved a southerly extension of US 93 south to Glendale, Nevada. By 1932, the Nevada Department of Highways had marked the continuation of the highway using the routing of several preexisting state highways as follows:

- From Wells, US 93 continued southeast along the remainder of SR 13 to its terminus at Lages Station.
- At Lages Station, the highway turned south, overlapping the southern portion of State Route 24 to Magnuson's Ranch.
- At Magnuson's Ranch, US 93 followed State Route 2 south for 31.2 miles (50.2 km) to Ely.
- The highway was then routed concurrently along the entirety of the nearly 250-mile (400 km) State Route 7, running southeast from Ely through Connor's Pass, south through Pioche to Caliente, west to Crystal Springs and then southeast through Alamo and Moapa before terminating at U.S. Route 91/State Route 6 in Glendale.

At the request of the Arizona State Highway Department, the AASHO route numbering committee approved another extension of US 93 in 1935. This shifted the southern terminus south to Kingman, Arizona by way of Las Vegas. However, Nevada officials may not have signed the extension of US 93 right away, since it was not shown on state-published maps until 1939. The highway was again extended along existing highways:

- From Glendale, US 93 followed US 91/SR 6 southwest 50 miles (80 km) to Las Vegas.
- In downtown Las Vegas, the route turned southeast and ran concurrent with U.S. Route 466/State Route 5 for 19 miles (31 km) southeast to the town of Alunite (near the present-day Railroad Pass).
- At Alunite, US 93 and US 466 turned to follow State Route 26 east for 4 miles (6.4 km) into Boulder City.
- In Boulder City, the combined US Routes dropped SR 26 and gained State Route 42 for the final 6-mile (9.7 km) journey towards Boulder Dam and into Arizona.

The new routing put the Nevada mileage of U.S. Route 93 at approximately 540 miles (870 km). The entire highway within Nevada was paved by 1939.

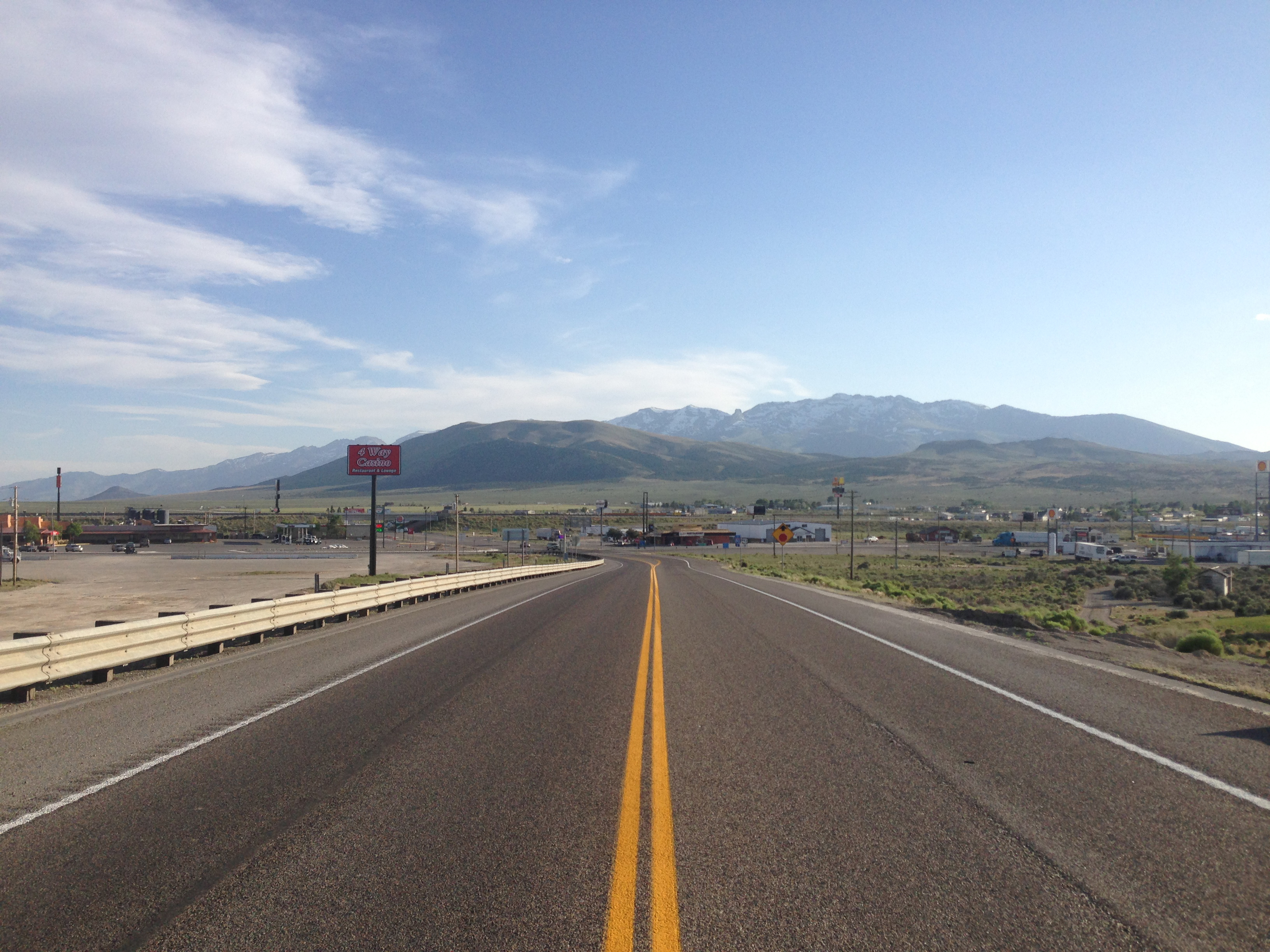
View south along US 93 just north of Wells as seen in 2014

=== Route changes ===
After US 93 was extended to Arizona in the 1930s, the route remained unchanged for many years. A 19-mile (31 km) concurrency with U.S. Route 95 between Las Vegas and Alunite was added in 1940, when that highway was extended through southern Nevada along State Route 5.

The first major shift of US 93 occurred in 1967, when a new highway connection was completed between US 91 (now I-15) and a point 24 miles (39 km) northwest of Glendale. The new alignment was oriented more north–south, shortening the distance between the Las Vegas area and Caliente by 23 miles (37 km). The old section of US 93 northwest of Glendale paralleling the Muddy River remained as State Route 7, and was renumbered in 1976 to State Route 168.

In 1982, a "truck bypass" along the upper reaches of Hemenway Wash, to skirt the central portion of Boulder City and allow a straighter, more steady climb for commercial vehicles, was nearing completion. But by the time this new route opened, it had been signed as mainline US 93, with the old, winding route of US 93 on the Nevada Highway (original SR 26) through town being changed to SR 500. This state highway designation was later dropped and that roadway is now maintained by Boulder City as "Nevada Way". The western end of this 1982 bypass was also later realigned from Colorado Street south to intersect directly at Buchanan Boulevard (in place of a wye intersection with Nevada Way a block to the east at Joshua Street), by using a small portion of abandoned railroad right-of-way. A shopping center now sits where the original truck bypass alignment once ran.

US 93 was realigned again on October 19, 2010, when the Mike O'Callaghan–Pat Tillman Memorial Bridge over the Black Canyon of the Colorado River opened to vehicular traffic. With that, the highway no longer passes over Hoover Dam, and the state-maintained portion of the replaced route was renamed as Hoover Dam Access Road (SR 172). In 2011, US 93 from Buchanan Boulevard to the Nevada terminus of the Hoover Dam Bypass was expanded to four through lanes with dedicated turn lanes at major intersections to better handle increased traffic loads from the Hoover Dam Bypass until its long-planned companion freeway around Boulder City was completed in 2018.

On August 9, 2018, US 93 was rerouted onto the Boulder City Bypass around the historic town. The most recent previous alignment (1982–2018) through the heart of Boulder City and along Hemenway Wash has now been re-signed as U.S. Route 93 Business.

== Major intersections ==
Note: Mileposts in Nevada reset at county lines; the start and end mileposts for each county are given in the county column.

County	Location	mi	km	Destinations	Notes
Colorado River		0.00	0.00	Future I-11 south / US 93 south – Kingman, Phoenix I-11 begins	Continuation into Arizona; southern terminus of I-11
Colorado River		0.00	0.00	Mike O'Callaghan–Pat Tillman Memorial Bridge; Arizona—Nevada state line	
Clark; CL 0.00–86.58	Lake Mead NRA to Las Vegas			US 93 concurrent with I-11 and US 95 (I-11 exits 14 to 23 and I-11/US 95 exits 62 to 76)	
Clark; CL 0.00–86.58	Las Vegas			I-11 north / US 95 north / I-15 south – Tonopah, Reno, Los Angeles	Northern end of I-11/US 95 concurrency; southern end of I-15 concurrency; I-11/US 95 exit 76; I-15 exit 42
Clark; CL 0.00–86.58	Las Vegas to North Las Vegas			US 93 concurrent with I-15 (exits 42 to 64)	
Clark; CL 0.00–86.58	North Las Vegas	52.03	83.73	Northern end of freeway	
Clark; CL 0.00–86.58	North Las Vegas	52.03	83.73	I-15 north – Salt Lake City	Northern end of I-15 concurrency; Diverging diamond interchange; I-15 exit 64
Clark; CL 0.00–86.58	North Las Vegas			Apex Great Basin Way / Las Vegas Boulevard	Las Vegas Boulevard was formerly part of US 91/US 93 south
Clark; CL 0.00–86.58	North Las Vegas			Grand Valley Parkway	Interchange southbound; serves Chuck Lenzie Generating Station
Clark; CL 0.00–86.58	North Las Vegas			Apex Power Parkway	Serves Silverhawk Generating Station
Clark; CL 0.00–86.58	Coyote Springs			SR 168 east (Glendale–Moapa Road) – Moapa, Glendale	SR 168 east was formerly part of US 93 south
Lincoln; LN 0.00–172.87	Crystal Springs			SR 318 north – Hiko, Sunnyside, Ely	
Lincoln; LN 0.00–172.87	Caliente			SR 317 south – Elgin	
Lincoln; LN 0.00–172.87	Panaca			SR 319 east – Cedar City (Utah)	
Lincoln; LN 0.00–172.87	Panaca			SR 816 west (Airport Road)	Serves Lincoln County Airport
Lincoln; LN 0.00–172.87				SR 320 north (Caselton Mine Road)	
Lincoln; LN 0.00–172.87				SR 321 north – Pioche	
Lincoln; LN 0.00–172.87	Pioche			SR 322 – Ursine, Spring Valley State Park	
Lincoln; LN 0.00–172.87				SR 321 south – Pioche	
Lincoln; LN 0.00–172.87				SR 320 south (Caselton Mine Road)	
White Pine; WP 0.00–116.69				SR 894 south – Shoshone	
White Pine; WP 0.00–116.69	Majors Place	27.61	44.43	US 6 east / US 50 east – Great Basin National Park, Delta	Southern end of US 6/US 50 concurrency
White Pine; WP 0.00–116.69	Ely			US 6 west – Lund Junction, Tonopah	Northern end of US 6 concurrency
White Pine; WP 0.00–116.69	Ely	53.45	86.02	US 50 west – Eureka, Carson City	Northern end of US 50 concurrency
White Pine; WP 0.00–116.69				SR 490 west (Ely Prison Road)	Serves Ely State Prison
White Pine; WP 0.00–116.69	Lages Station			US 93 Alt. north – West Wendover	
Elko; EL 0.00–127.54				SR 229 west (Secret Pass Road) – Ruby Valley	Serves Ruby Lake National Wildlife Refuge
Elko; EL 0.00–127.54				SR 232 south (Clover Valley Road)	
Elko; EL 0.00–127.54	Wells			I-80 / US 93 Alt. south – Salt Lake City, Elko	
Elko; EL 0.00–127.54	Wells			I-80 BL west / SR 223 west (6th Street)	
Elko; EL 0.00–127.54	Jackpot	127.54	205.26	US 93 north – Twin Falls	Continuation into Idaho
1.000 mi = 1.609 km; 1.000 km = 0.621 mi: Concurrency terminus

== Special routes ==
- U.S. Route 93 Alternate, an alternate route beginning in Lages Station serving West Wendover and Wells
- U.S. Route 93 Business, a business route in Boulder City

== See also ==
- List of U.S. Routes in Nevada

U.S. Route 93
Previous state: Arizona	Nevada	Next state: Idaho
