= Nevada State Route 320 =

State highway in Nevada, United States

State Route 320
- Caselton Mine Loop
- SR 320 highlighted in red

Route information
- Maintained by NDOT
- Length: 10.674 mi (17.178 km)
- Existed: 1976–present

Major junctions
- Southeast end: US 93 south of Pioche
- Northwest end: US 93 north of Pioche

Location
- Country: United States
- State: Nevada

Highway system
- Nevada State Highway System; Interstate; US; State; Pre‑1976; Scenic
← SR 319	→ SR 321

State Route 320 (SR 320) is a state highway in Lincoln County, Nevada, United States. Known as the Caselton Mine Loop, the highway is a loop route of U.S. Route 93 (US 93) near Pioche serving the Caselton Mining District.

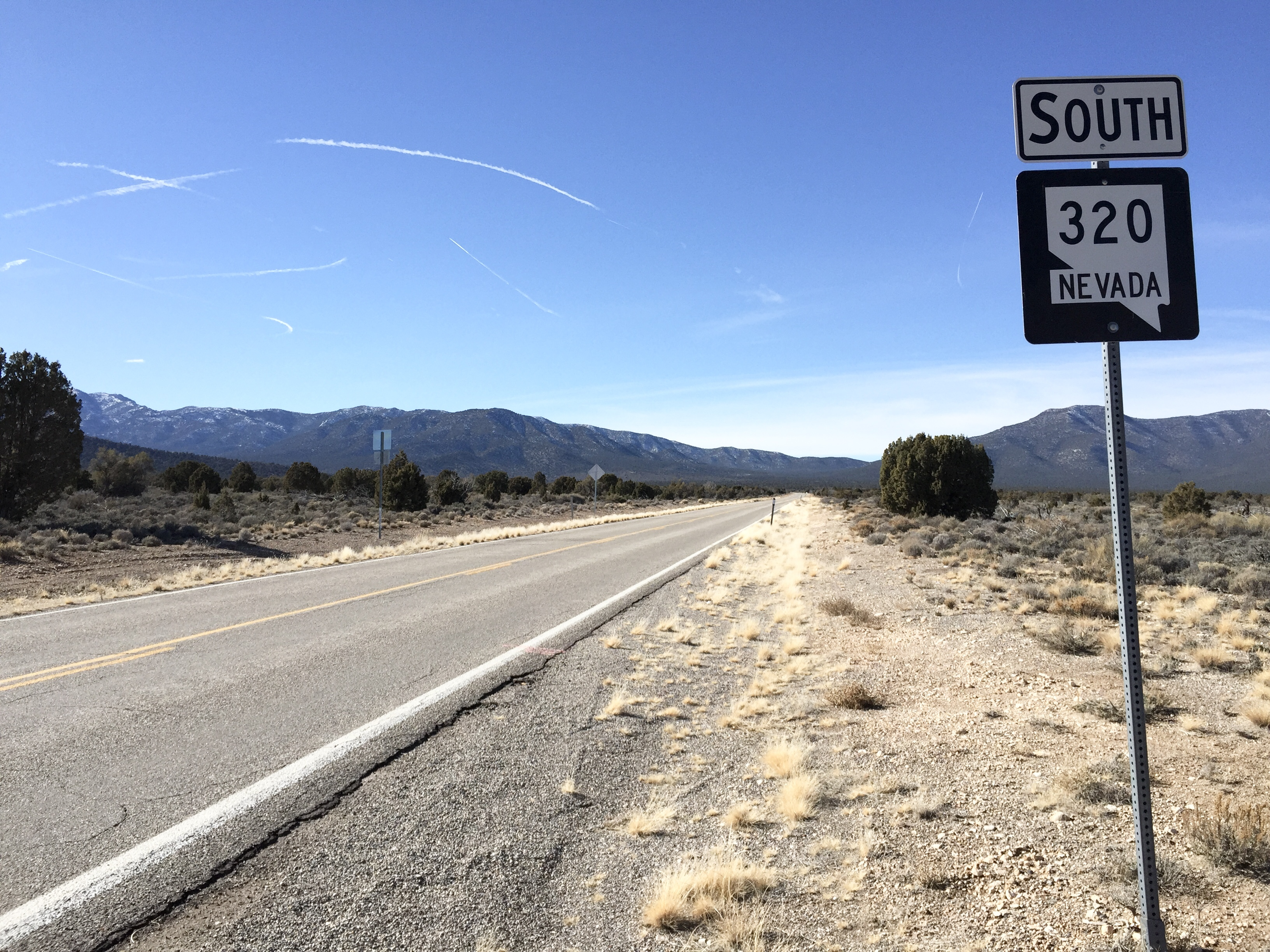
View from the north end of SR 320 looking southbound

== Major intersections ==
The entire route is in Lincoln County.

Location	mi	km	Destinations	Notes
	0.000	0.000	US 93	
	10.674	17.178	US 93	
1.000 mi = 1.609 km; 1.000 km = 0.621 mi
