= Bullionville, Nevada =

- Ghost town
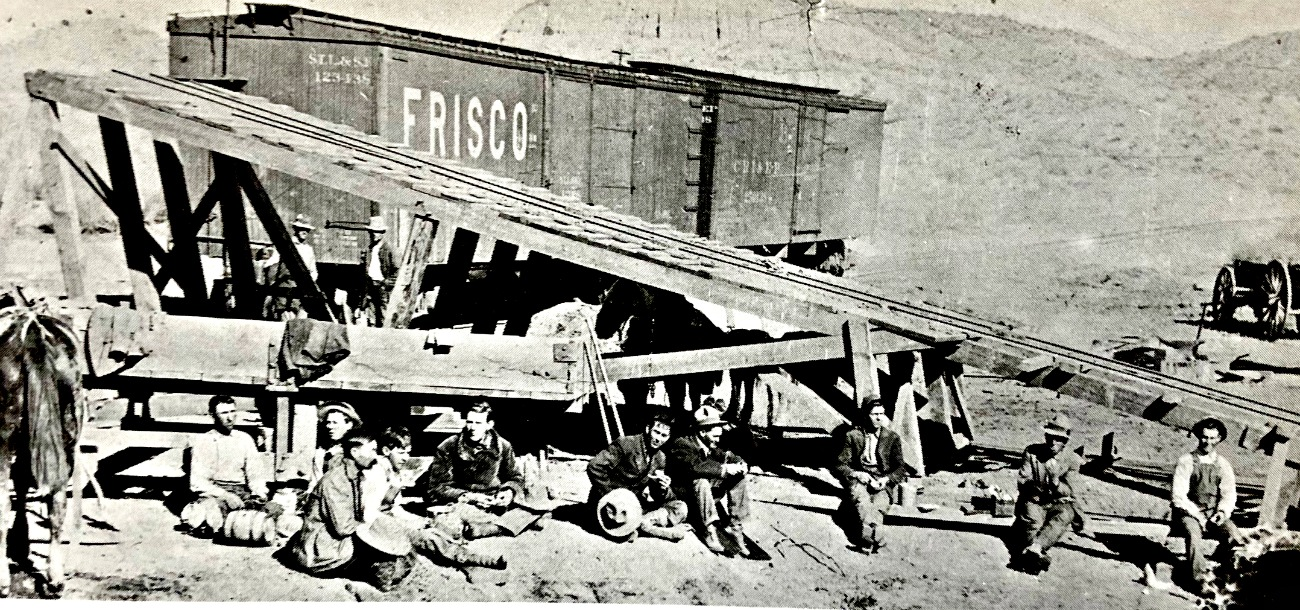
- Bullionville, c 1875

- Location within Nevada Location within the United States
- Coordinates: 37°48′12″N 114°24′25″W
- Country: United States
- State: Nevada
- County: Lincoln
- Elevation: 4,760 ft (1,451 m)

Bullionville is a ghost town in Lincoln County, Nevada, United States, 1/4 mile east of U.S. Route 93, one mile north of Panaca and 10 miles (16 km) south of Pioche. The town prospered between 1870 and 1882, and is now abandoned.

== History ==
Bullionville was established in February 1870, after the Raymond & Ely five-stamp mill was moved to the site. The site was selected because of the dependable supply of water from Meadow Valley Creek. The camp, initially named Ely City, was renamed Bullionville later that year. From 1870 to 1872, nearby Pioche's mills were built at Bullionville because of its excellent water supply. The construction of a narrow gauge railroad, began in 1872, with the purpose of hauling ore between the mills and nearby mines. The 21-mile long Pioche and Bullionville Railroad was moving ore by 1873.

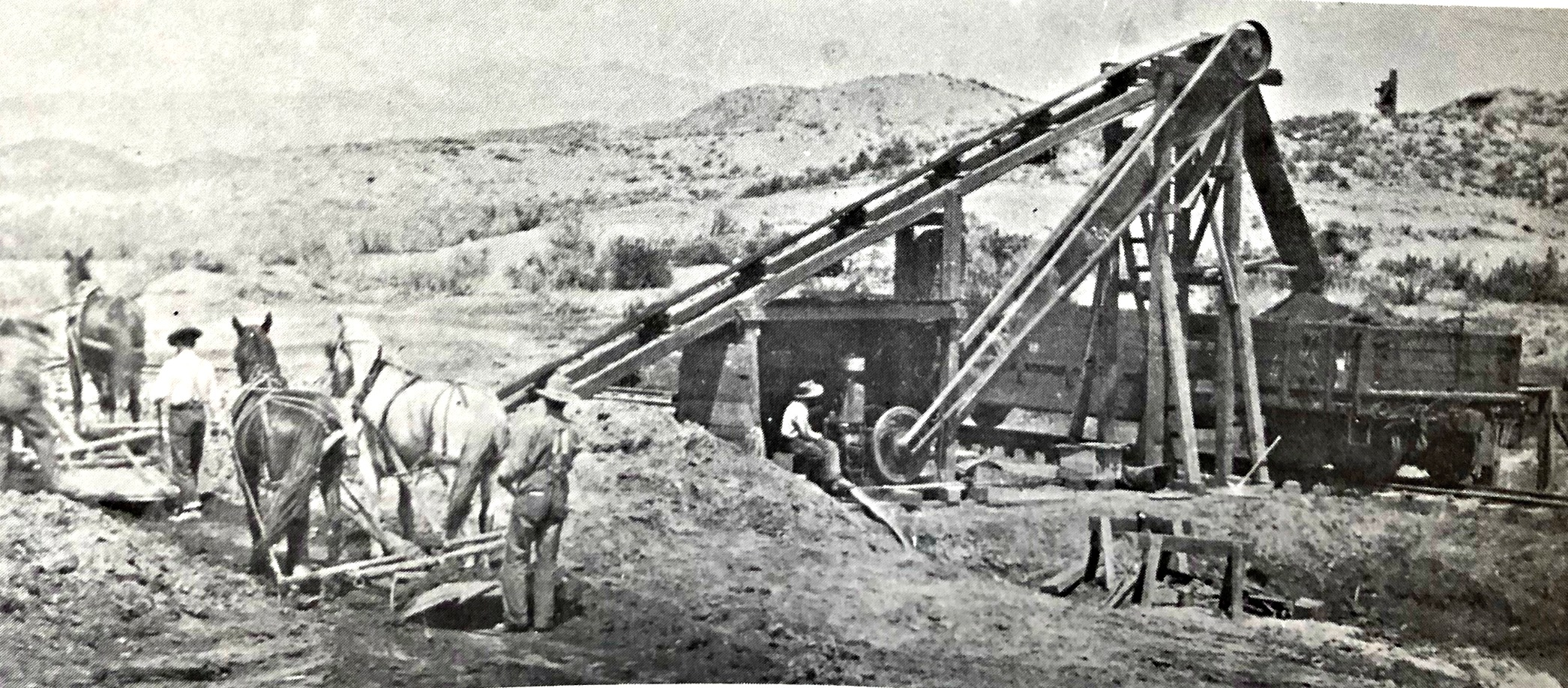
Bullionville workers, c 1875

Bullionville's population grew quickly between 1872 and 1875, with a population of 500. The town had hotels, stores, multiple saloons, blacksmith shops and daily stage service to Pioche. In April 1874, the post office opened. In 1875, a water system between Bullionville and Pioche was completed, which supported Pioche's water requirements for milling. After 1875, Bullionville slowly declined, and the settlement's mills were moved between 1875 and 1877. The railroad between Pioche and Bullionville stopped running by 1880, and the town was eventually abandoned. The post office closed in November 1886, reopened in October 1892 and closed again in July 1898. There are no original buildings to mark the site of the original settlement.
