= Thompson's Opera House =

Historic theater in Pioche, Nevada

- Brown's Hall-Thompson's Opera House
- U.S. National Register of Historic Places
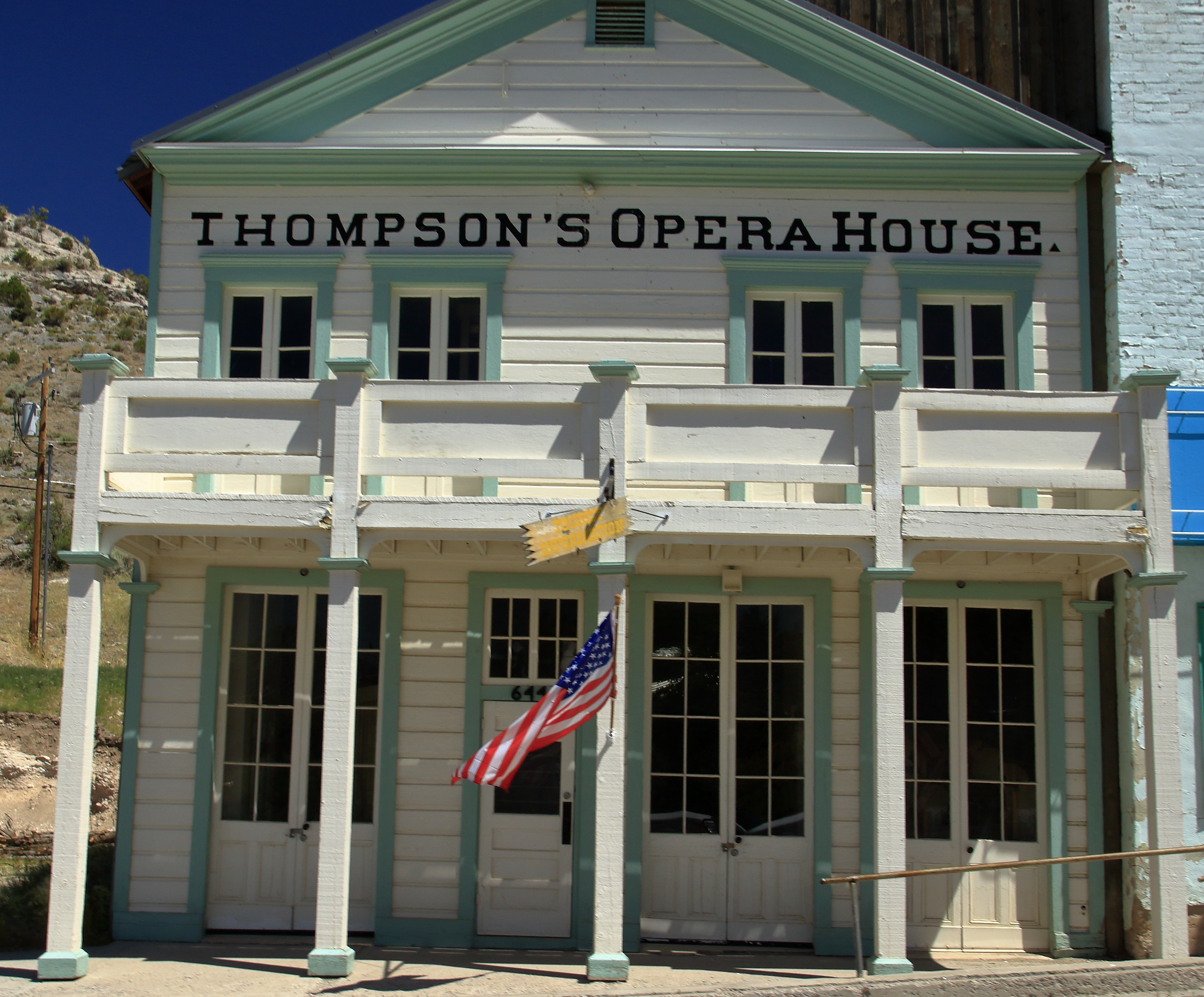
- The opera house in 2023

- Location within Nevada Location within the United States
- Location: 644 Main Street, Pioche, Nevada 89043
- Coordinates: 37°55′49″N 114°27′04″W
- Built: 1873
- Architect: Brown, Aleck
- Architectural style: Greek Revival
- Website: Thompson's Opera House
- NRHP reference No.: 84002074
- Added to NRHP: August 16, 1984

Thompson's Opera House, previously known as Brown's Hall, Brown's Opera House and the Gem Theater, is a small theater building in Pioche, Nevada. The Opera House is a wood-frame building built in 1873, attached roughly to the adjoining brick Gem Theater, a 1937 masonry cinema.

== History ==
The Opera House was used as a community meeting house, dance hall and theater. Aleck Brown built the theater in September 1873 and featured a performance of Pygmalion and Galatea for its opening night, with a cast of professional actors from San Francisco. The Opera House was purchased in 1891 by Alexander S. Thompson of Pioche. Thompson renovated the floor and enlarged the stage. After Thompson's death in 1905 his sons Charles and Frank took over, remodeling in 1907. The Opera House screened its first silent movie in 1915. In 1935 the Opera House was renamed the Gem Theater after Frank Thompson took over sole management, but in 1937 he built a new Gem Theater next door expressly for movies. The Opera House declined from that point and finally closed in the 1940s.

The National Register of Historic Places listed the opera house in 1984. In 2009, the building was restored by Lincoln County and now hosts musical and community events.

In 2022, renovations began at the adjacent Gem Theater. In 2023, the community celebrated the opera house's 150th anniversary.

== Architecture ==
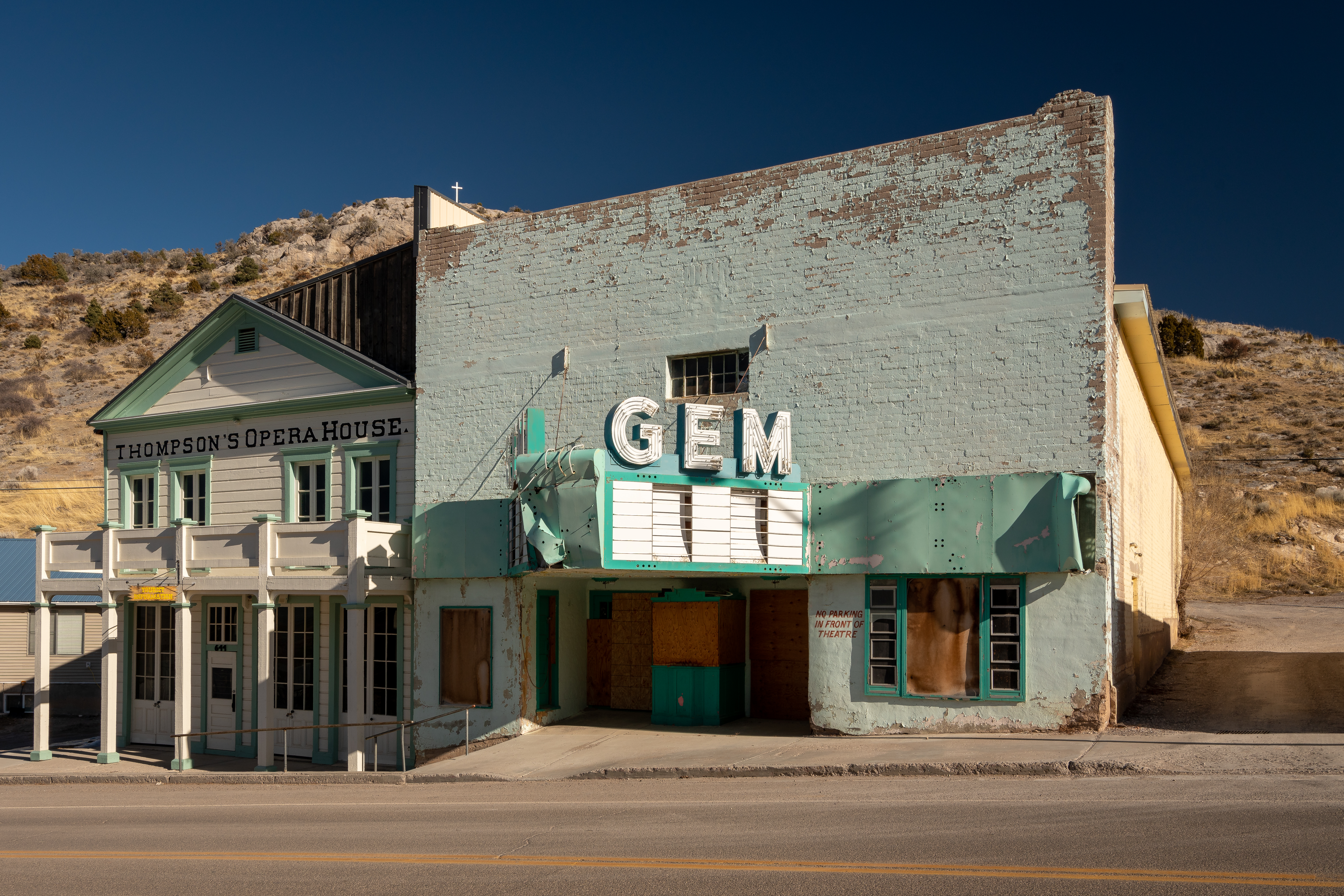
The Greek Revival opera house next to the Art Deco movie theater (right)

The two-story rectangular building shows elements of the Greek Revival style with its shallow front pediment. It originally featured a one-story porch across the width of the facade with a balustrade above, removed but now restored. Clapboards cover the front while the side and rear are sheathed in board and batten siding. Heavy timbers frame the structure in a post-and-beam arrangement.

The ground floor housed commercial space and dressing rooms. The main hall is on the second floor, entered by steep stairs from the street. A shed-roofed addition to the rear is built into the hillside and houses the stage at the second-floor level.

== See also ==
- National Register of Historic Places listings in Lincoln County, Nevada
