= Gem Theater (Pioche, Nevada) =

Historic theater in Pioche, Nevada

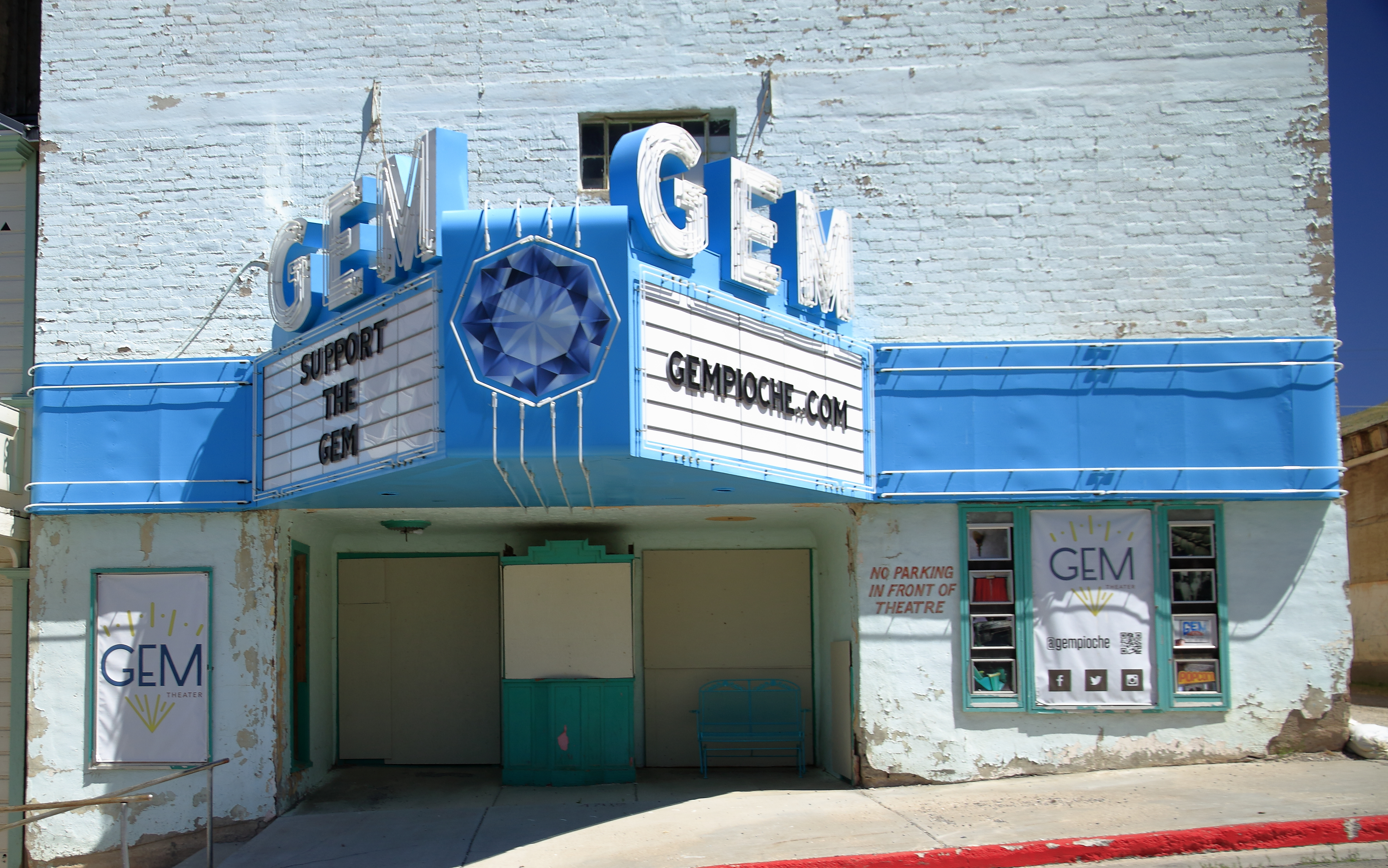
- Building with restored marquee in 2023
- Interactive map of Gem Theater
- Address: 648 Main Street; Pioche, Nevada 89043
- Owner: Friends of Gem Theater
- Operator: Melissa Clary
- Capacity: 250
- Type: Movie theater
- Current use: Vacant during restoration

Construction
- Opened: 1937
- Closed: 2002
- Reopened: Pending

Website
- gempioche.com
- Gem Theater
- U.S. National Register of Historic Places
- Location within Nevada Location within the United States
- Coordinates: 37°55′48″N 114°27′04″W
- Architectural style: Art Deco
- NRHP reference No.: 100009942
- Added to NRHP: February 7, 2024

The Gem Theater is a movie theater in Pioche, Nevada, originally constructed in 1937, that closed in 2002. The National Register of Historic Places listed the building in 2019 as part of an effort at reopening.

== History ==
Prior to construction of this building, Brown's Hall was built in 1873 on an adjacent plot. That theater, later renamed to Thompson's Opera House, originally focused on live stage shows and musical performances. Increasingly the venue focused on showing movies on a retrofitted stage, so it was again renamed to the Gem Theater in the 1930s.

In 1937, this larger movie theater opened next door as a purpose-built building. The new venue reused the name "Gem Theater" while the older opera house reverted to its former name. The Gem served as the only movie theater in Lincoln County. During World War II, it kept the community abreast of vital developments via newsreels.

The theater closed and reopened multiple times before a windstorm finally blew part of the roof off in 2002 and the building has been vacant ever since. Melissa Clary purchased the building in 2020, after previously leading the effort to preserve the Huntridge Theater in Las Vegas. In 2022, the Friends of Gem Theater held a lighting ceremony for the newly restored marquee.

In order to raise funds, the group held fundraisers and sold watercolor prints of the building. In 2023, the Nevada Legislature allocated $1 million toward renovation costs. In 2024, the theater was added to the National Register of Historic Places, which enables the group to gain eligibility for additional grants and tax incentives.

== Architecture ==
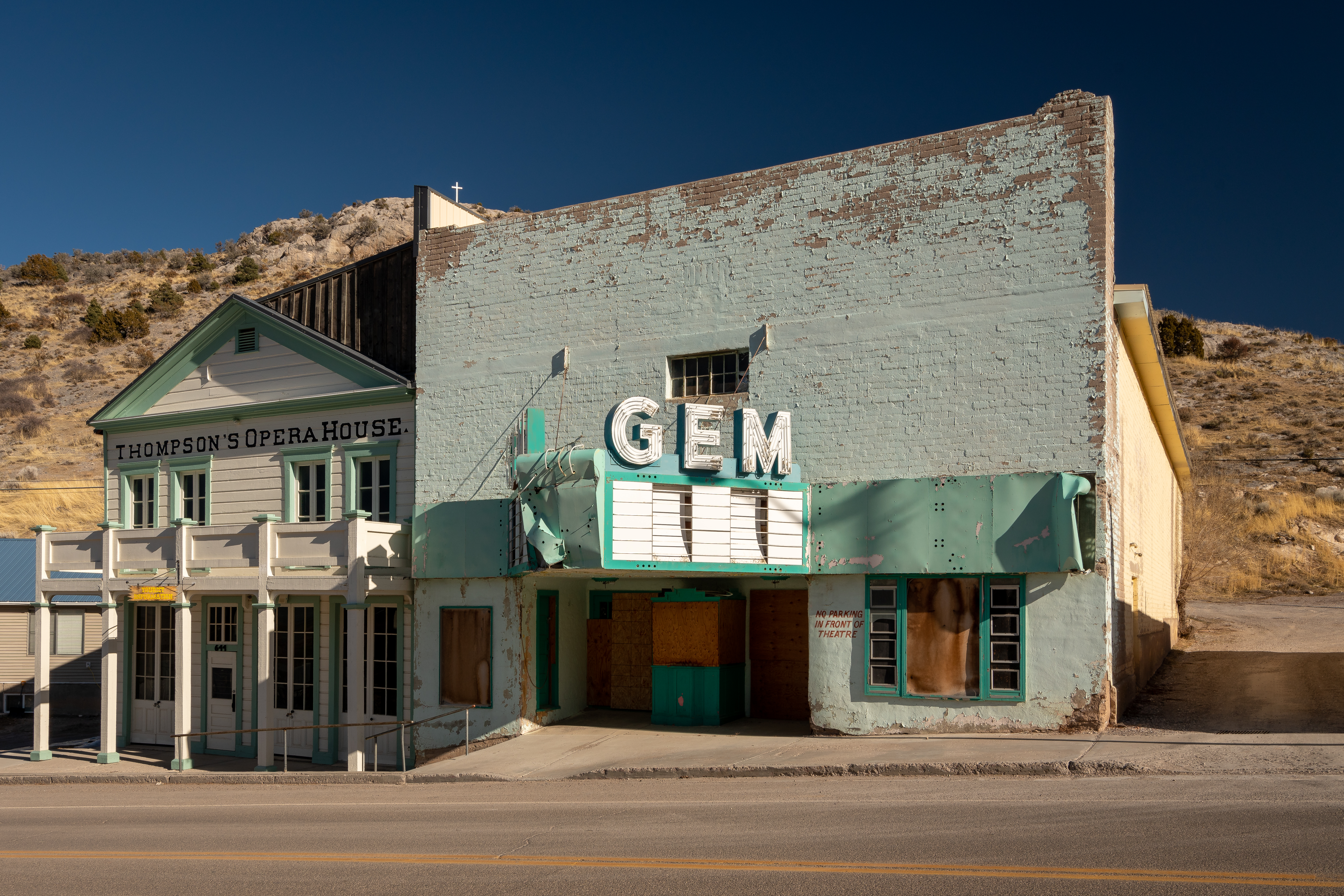
The Art Deco theater next to the Greek Revival opera house (left)

The Art Deco movie theater sits prominently on a hillside in the downtown area of the small town. A blue neon marquee over a ticket booth dominates the exterior. The inside consists of the single theater, projection booth, stepdown restrooms, and a sob room for crying children. Preserving the Gem is made difficult both because no original floor plans survive and due to water penetration.

== See also ==
- National Register of Historic Places listings in Lincoln County, Nevada
