= Shoshone, Nevada =

Unincorporated community in Nevada, US

- Unincorporated community
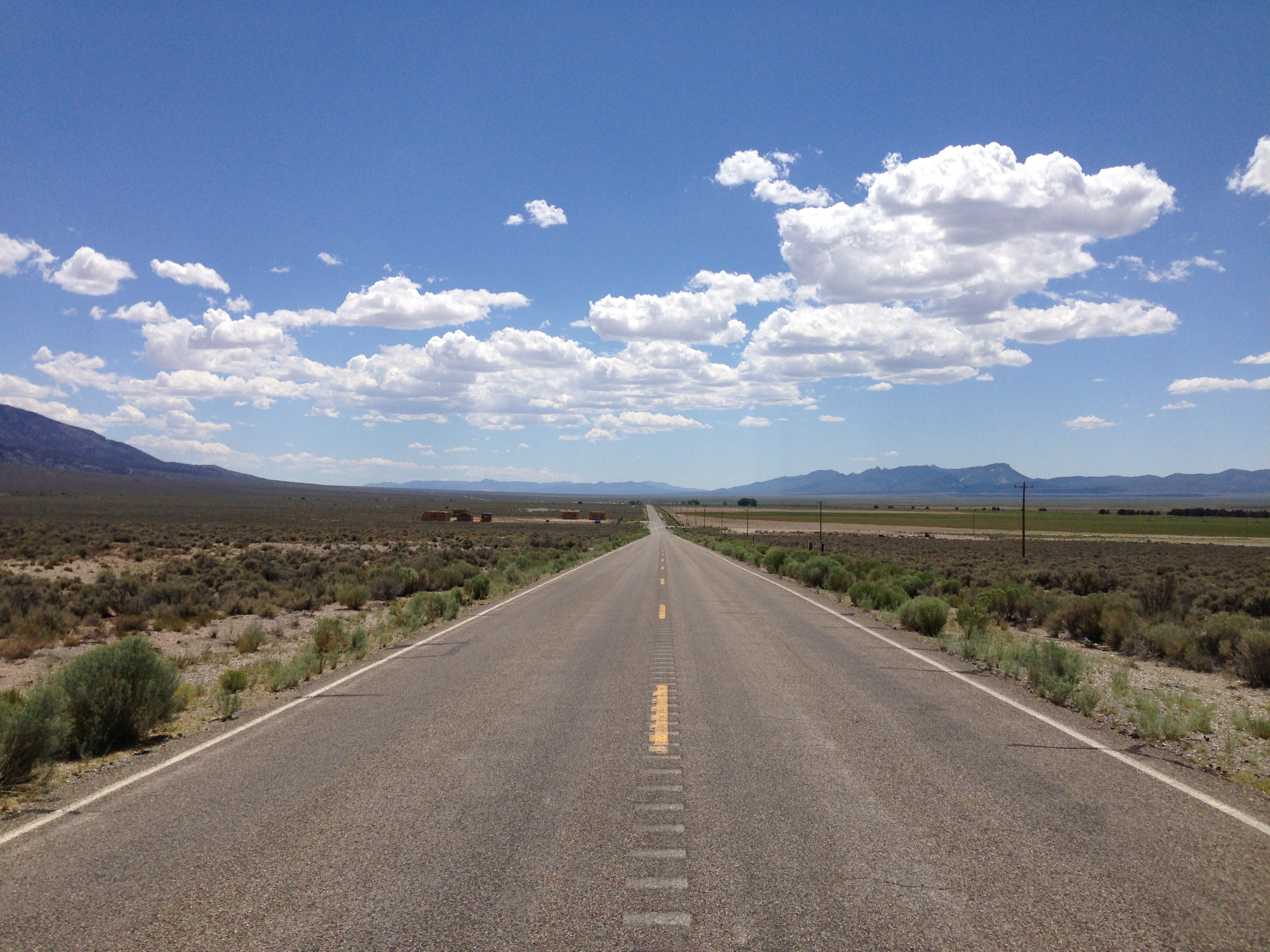
- View along SR 894 southbound in Shoshone

- Location within the state of Nevada
- Coordinates: 38°50′55″N 114°24′28″W
- Country: United States
- State: Nevada
- County: White Pine
- Elevation: 5,791 ft (1,765 m)
- Time zone: UTC-8 (Pacific (PST))
  - Summer (DST): UTC-7 (PDT)
- GNIS feature ID: 850932

Shoshone is a rural, unincorporated community in White Pine County, Nevada. It is at the south end of State Route 894, off of U.S. Route 93, just west of Great Basin National Park. The community consists of approximately nine ranches situated one to three miles apart in a long valley. The historic mine site of Minerva is located in Shoshone.

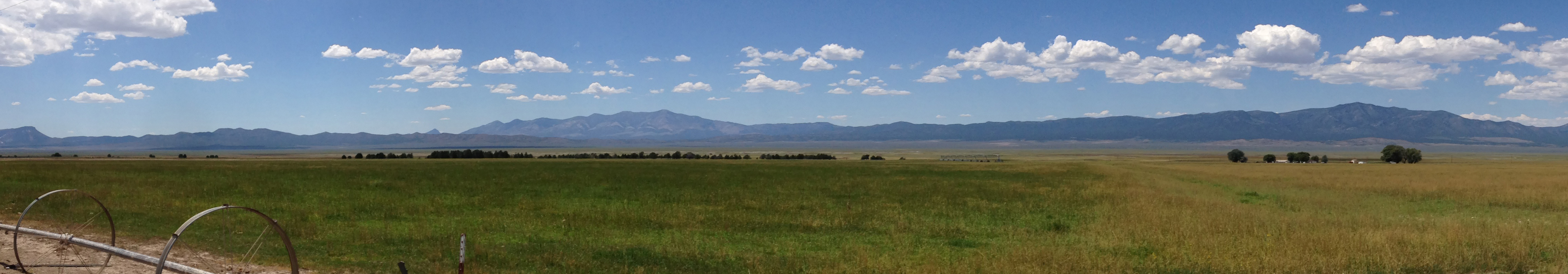
Ranches in Shoshone
