= Spring Valley State Park =

State park in Nevada, United States

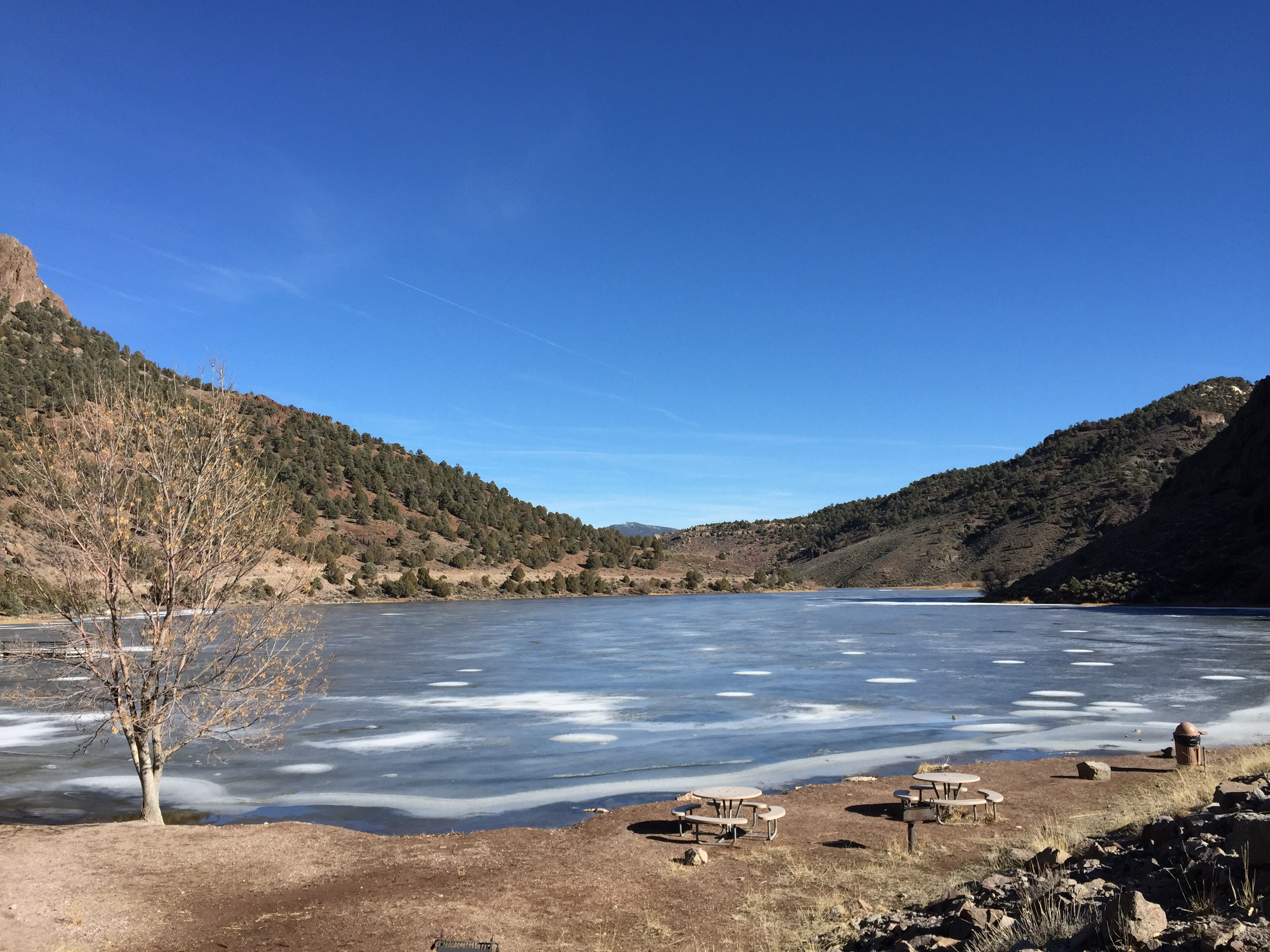
- Eagle Valley Reservoir

- Location within Nevada
- Location: Lincoln County, Nevada, United States
- Nearest town: Pioche, Nevada
- Coordinates: 38°1′23″N 114°11′53″W
- Area: 926.83 acres (375.07 ha)
- Elevation: 5,840 ft (1,780 m)
- Established: 1969
- Administrator: Nevada Division of State Parks
- Visitors: 29,311 vehicles (in 2017)
- Designation: Nevada state park
- Website: Official website

Spring Valley State Park is a public recreation area adjoining the 65-acre (26 ha) Eagle Valley Reservoir in eastern Nevada near the border with the state of Utah. The state park is located at the east end of Nevada State Route 322, 20 miles (32 km) east of the town of Pioche and near the village of Ursine.

== History ==
The Eagle Valley Dam was built on Meadow Valley Wash in 1965, creating the Eagle Valley Reservoir for agricultural usage. The area around the reservoir was designated a state park in 1969.

== Activities and amenities ==
The park offers camping, fishing, a boat launch, picnicking, hiking trails, historic ranch buildings, and a group-use area.

== Climate ==
Climate data for Spring Valley State Park, Nevada, 1991–2020 normals, 1974-2020 extremes: 5950ft (1814m)
Month	Jan	Feb	Mar	Apr	May	Jun	Jul	Aug	Sep	Oct	Nov	Dec	Year
Record high °F (°C)	68 (20)	74 (23)	80 (27)	84 (29)	94 (34)	99 (37)	108 (42)	103 (39)	99 (37)	89 (32)	77 (25)	68 (20)	108 (42)
Mean maximum °F (°C)	55.9 (13.3)	59.5 (15.3)	67.9 (19.9)	75.8 (24.3)	83.8 (28.8)	92.2 (33.4)	97.1 (36.2)	94.0 (34.4)	88.7 (31.5)	79.3 (26.3)	68.1 (20.1)	57.0 (13.9)	97.7 (36.5)
Mean daily maximum °F (°C)	43.7 (6.5)	47.0 (8.3)	54.7 (12.6)	62.1 (16.7)	71.5 (21.9)	82.9 (28.3)	89.3 (31.8)	87.0 (30.6)	79.8 (26.6)	66.9 (19.4)	53.7 (12.1)	43.6 (6.4)	65.2 (18.4)
Daily mean °F (°C)	26.9 (−2.8)	30.9 (−0.6)	37.9 (3.3)	43.1 (6.2)	51.1 (10.6)	59.1 (15.1)	66.2 (19.0)	64.1 (17.8)	56.3 (13.5)	44.8 (7.1)	34.7 (1.5)	26.3 (−3.2)	45.1 (7.3)
Mean daily minimum °F (°C)	10.1 (−12.2)	14.8 (−9.6)	21.0 (−6.1)	24.2 (−4.3)	30.6 (−0.8)	35.2 (1.8)	43.2 (6.2)	41.2 (5.1)	32.8 (0.4)	22.8 (−5.1)	15.8 (−9.0)	9.0 (−12.8)	25.1 (−3.9)
Mean minimum °F (°C)	−10.9 (−23.8)	−3.1 (−19.5)	7.2 (−13.8)	11.8 (−11.2)	18.8 (−7.3)	25.4 (−3.7)	31.7 (−0.2)	30.4 (−0.9)	22.2 (−5.4)	11.5 (−11.4)	0.8 (−17.3)	−8.6 (−22.6)	−17.4 (−27.4)
Record low °F (°C)	−29 (−34)	−33 (−36)	−10 (−23)	−3 (−19)	9 (−13)	13 (−11)	24 (−4)	21 (−6)	13 (−11)	−2 (−19)	−26 (−32)	−45 (−43)	−45 (−43)
Average precipitation inches (mm)	1.04 (26)	1.51 (38)	1.42 (36)	0.87 (22)	0.86 (22)	0.51 (13)	1.00 (25)	1.57 (40)	1.00 (25)	1.22 (31)	0.69 (18)	1.43 (36)	13.12 (332)
Average snowfall inches (cm)	4.80 (12.2)	5.90 (15.0)	5.00 (12.7)	1.60 (4.1)	0.20 (0.51)	0.00 (0.00)	0.00 (0.00)	0.00 (0.00)	0.00 (0.00)	0.40 (1.0)	2.60 (6.6)	6.10 (15.5)	26.6 (67.61)
Source 1: NOAA (1981-2010 snowfall)
Source 2: XMACIS2 (records & monthly max/mins)
