= Chuck Lenzie Generating Station =

Gas-fired power station in Nevada, US

- Country: United States
- Location: 30 miles north of Las Vegas, Nevada
- Coordinates: 36.383719°N 114.9218°W
- Status: Operating
- Construction began: 2004
- Commission date: 2006
- Owner: NV Energy
- Operator: NV Energy

Thermal power station
- Primary fuel: Natural gas
- Turbine technology: Combined cycle
- Cooling source: Dry cooling system

Power generation
- Units operational: 2
- Make and model: 2 x D-11 steam turbines powered by 4 x 7FA combustion turbines
- Nameplate capacity: 1,102 MW

Chuck Lenzie Generating Station is a 1,102-megawatt (1,478,000 hp) gas-fired power station located 30 miles north of Las Vegas, Nevada, near the junction of Interstate 15 and the Great Basin Highway (Nevada State Route 93). Power is generated by two D-11 steam turbines powered by four 7FA combustion turbines. The plant was the first company-owned power plant built since 1995.

== History ==
The facility began construction in 2004 as a Duke Energy, power station. The plant was sold to NV Energy and began production in 2006.

== Facility ==
Since it is located in a desert where water is limited, the plant uses a six-story-high dry cooling system.
