= 1938 Lincoln County Courthouse =

- U.S. National Register of Historic Places
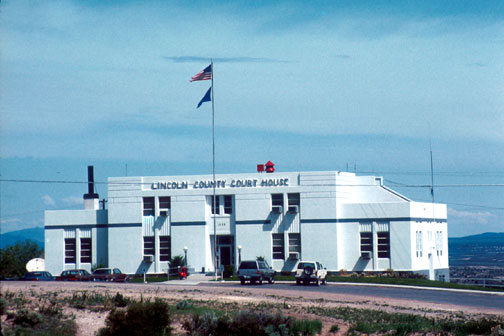

- Location within Nevada Location within the United States
- Location: 1 Main St., Pioche, Nevada
- Coordinates: 37°56′13″N 114°27′2″W
- Built: 1938
- Architect: Worswick, A. Lacy; Dow, L.F.,
- Architectural style: Art Moderne (PWA Moderne)
- NRHP reference No.: 02000820
- Added to NRHP: July 25, 2002

The 1938 Lincoln County Courthouse is an Art Moderne style building in Pioche, Nevada. The 1938 courthouse replaced the so-called "million-dollar courthouse" built in 1871, whose last payment on the approximately $800,000 it cost was coincidentally made in 1938.

In 1937, Lincoln County began receiving proceeds of a major boom in lead and zinc mining that ran through the 1950s and provided a major portion of the county's tax revenues. As the old county courthouse deteriorated, sentiment to replace it grew, resulting in a 1937 bond issue. At this time the county received a grant of $26,800 from the Public Works Administration toward 45% of the cost of a new courthouse. The PWA money carried conditions, one of which was a close review of the design. A modern look was preferred, to the point that a simplified Art Deco-Art Moderne style became known as PWA Moderne. The new courthouse was designed by Las Vegas architect A.L. Worswick in this style.

After an initial bidding process in which all bids were above the $60,000 budget, a second bid in 1938 produced a low bid of $49,347. The bidder, L.F. Dow of Los Angeles and Las Vegas, completed the courthouse in 1939. The building has served as the county courthouse, jail, county sheriff's office, and state office building ever since. It was placed on the National Register of Historic Places in 2002.
