= Lincoln County Courthouse (1872) =

- U.S. National Register of Historic Places
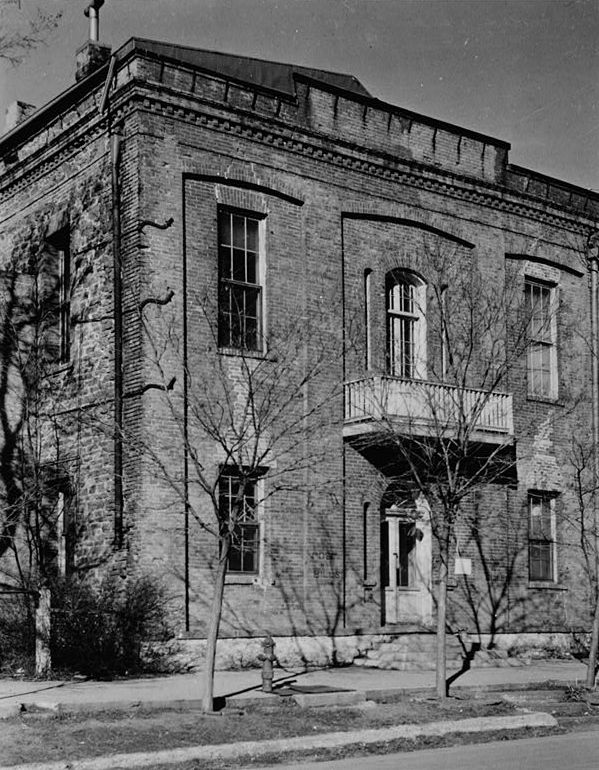

- Location within Nevada Location within the United States
- Interactive map showing the location of Lincoln County Courthouse
- Location: Lacour St., Pioche, Nevada
- Coordinates: 37°55′54″N 114°27′7″W
- Built: 1872
- NRHP reference No.: 78001724
- Added to NRHP: February 23, 1978

The first Lincoln County Courthouse, also known as the Pioche Courthouse and the Old Lincoln County Courthouse, in Pioche, Nevada earned the title "Million Dollar Courthouse" after it cost $75,000 to build in 1872 (equivalent to $2,020,000 in 2025), for a relatively small building. With added costs attributed to finance charges and fiscal mismanagement, the cost in 1872 dollars came to over $800,000 (equivalent to $21,500,000 in 2025). The debt incurred by the county was not retired until 1938, when the new courthouse was under construction.

The budget for the courthouse project was $26,000. However the initial construction contract was broken and the building was completed with separate contracts at a much higher total cost. In the meantime the county issued a $75,000 bond and quantities of scrip to cover other county obligations that were charged to the courthouse project. With the decline of mining in the county tax assessments fell and the county failed to keep up with interest charges and made no payments at all on principal. An attempted repudiation of the debt in the 1880s failed. Finally, in 1907 the Nevada legislature established a plan to redeem the debt at 65% of the outstanding obligation, with part of the debt undertaken by Clark County, newly created from the southern part of Lincoln County in 1909. The debt was retired in 1938, the same year that the new courthouse was built. The 1872 courthouse was alleged at the time to be unstable and deteriorating.

Despite its state of disrepair, the courthouse survived almost forty years of abandonment and was restored in the 1970s to function as a local history museum. The courthouse was designed by T. Dimmock and Thomas Keefe. The two-story building is Italianate in style with a brick front and rubble stone masonry sides and rear. Sited on a hill to the rear, the jail is accessible from the second floor. The courthouse was listed on the National Register of Historic Places in 1978.
