= Lincoln County Courthouse (Wyoming) =

- U.S. National Register of Historic Places
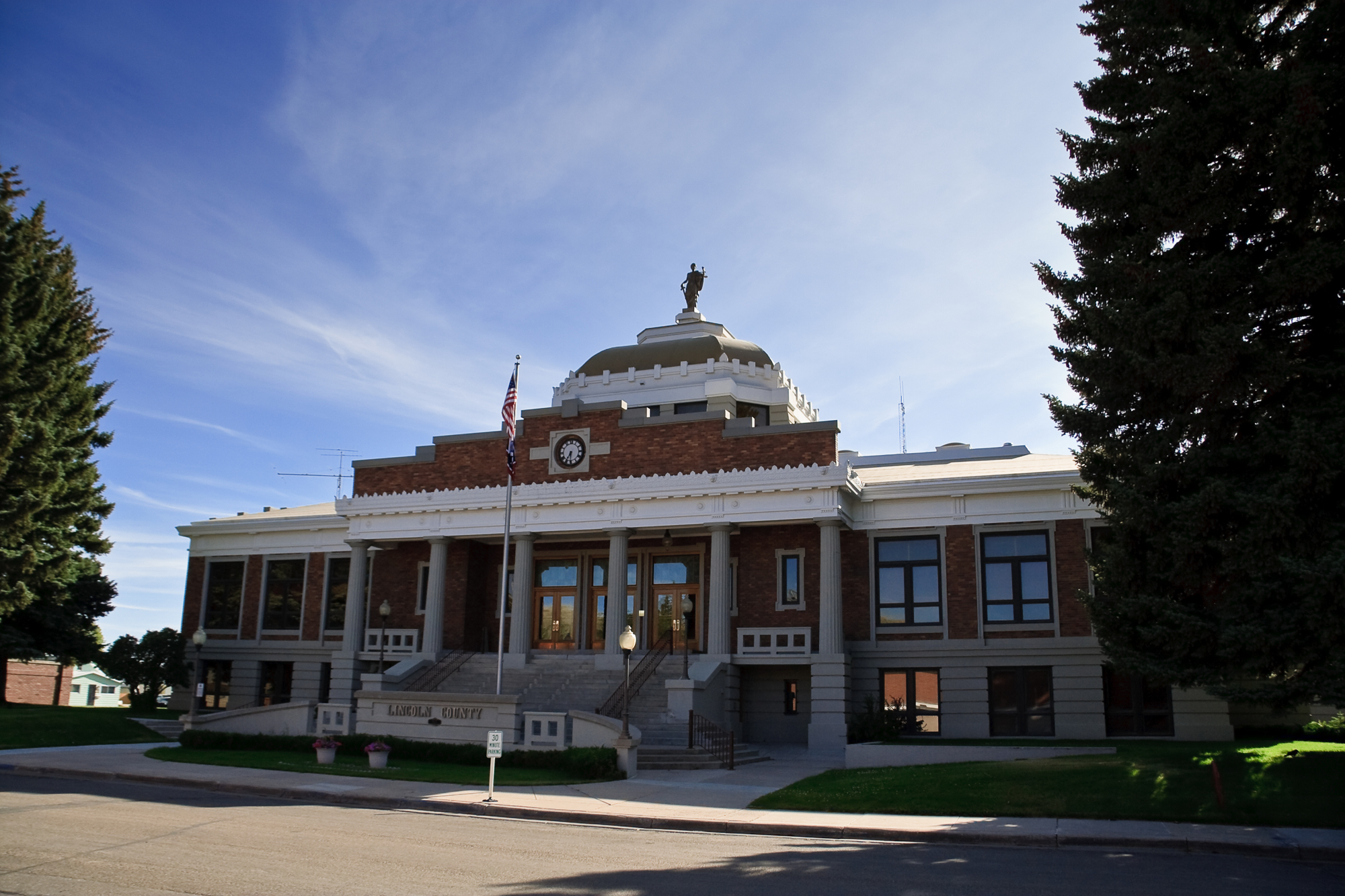

- Location within Wyoming Location within the United States
- Location: 925 Sage Ave., Kemmerer, Wyoming, United States
- Coordinates: 41°47′37″N 110°32′26″W
- Built: 1925
- Architect: Headlund & Watkins
- Architectural style: Beaux Arts, Classical Revival
- NRHP reference No.: 84000385
- Added to NRHP: November 8, 1984

The Lincoln County Courthouse is a historic courthouse in Kemmerer, the county seat of Lincoln County, Wyoming, United States. The courthouse's architecture is an unusual mixture of the Beaux-Arts and Classical Revival styles. Built in 1925, it was designed by the Salt Lake City architectural company of Headlund & Watkins. Located at the intersection of Sage Avenue and Garnet Street, the courthouse includes a high dome and classical façade, supported by large brick walls.

== Functions ==
The courthouse remains functional today, housing the offices of the county commissioners and offices such as the county assessor, county clerk, and county treasurer. Not all county offices use the courthouse; for example, the sheriff's office is located on a different street.

== Recognition ==
Located adjacent to the courthouse is the Lincoln County War Memorial. Dedicated on June 1, 1990, the memorial honors residents of Lincoln County who were killed in World War I, World War II, and the Korean and Vietnam Wars.

On November 8, 1984, the courthouse was added to the National Register of Historic Places.

== See also ==
- National Register of Historic Places listings in Wyoming
