= Lages Station, Nevada =

- Ghost town
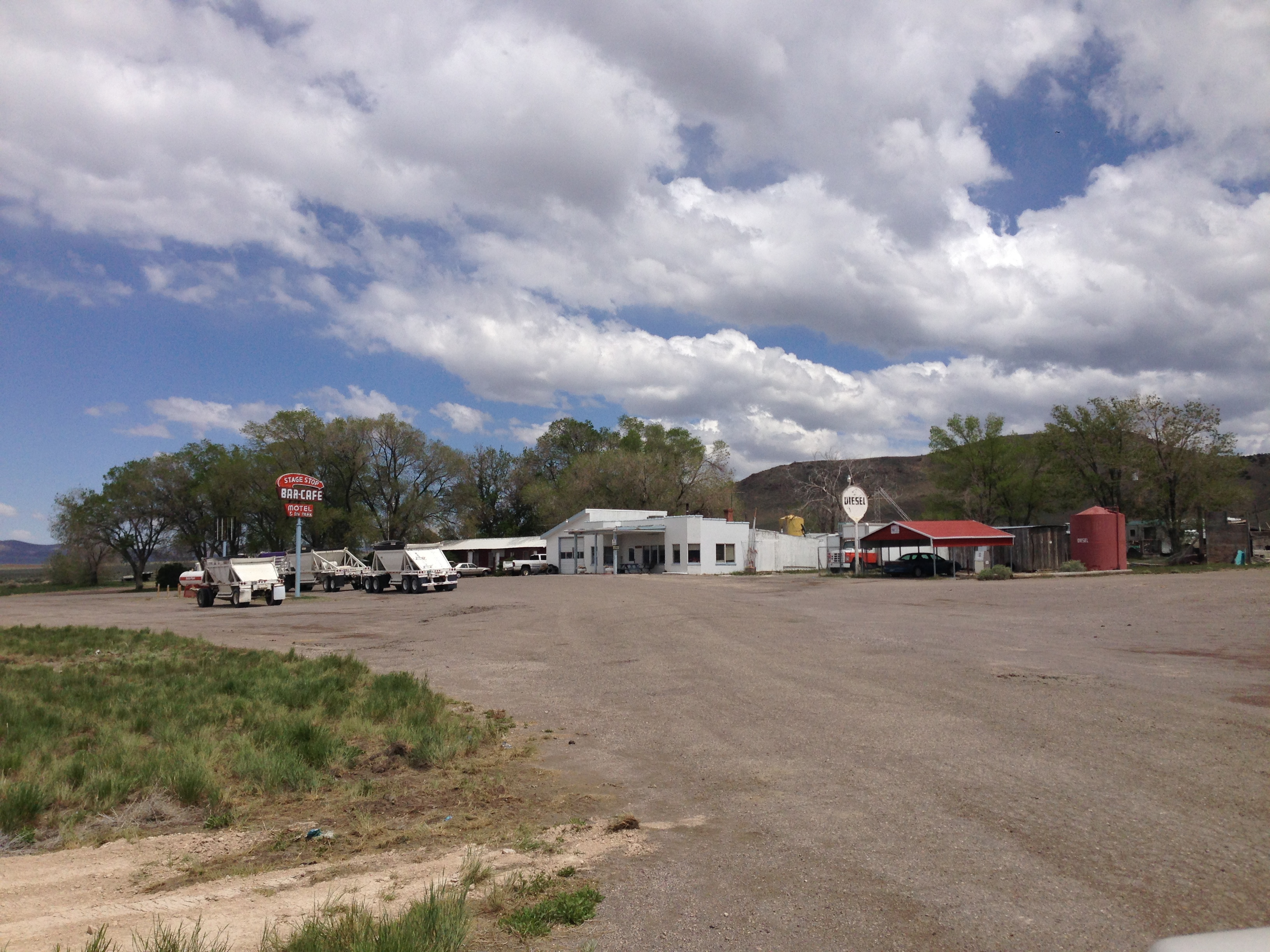
- Nickname: Lage's Junction (NDOT signage)
- Location within Nevada Location within the United States
- Coordinates: 40°03′50″N 114°36′53″W
- Country: United States
- State: Nevada
- County: White Pine
- Elevation: 5,981 ft (1,823 m)
- Time zone: UTC-8 (Pacific (PST))
  - Summer (DST): PDT (UTC-7)

Lages Station is a ghost town in White Pine County, in the U.S. state of Nevada. As of 2007, the town's only remaining inhabitants were a single family, running the town's only operating business, a gas station.
