= Ursine, Nevada =

- Census-designated place
- Location within the state of Nevada
- Coordinates: 37°58′38″N 114°13′44″W
- Country: United States
- State: Nevada
- County: Lincoln

Area
  - Total: 4.34 sq mi (11.24 km^{2})
  - Land: 4.34 sq mi (11.24 km^{2})
  - Water: 0 sq mi (0.00 km^{2})
- Elevation: 5,909 ft (1,801 m)

Population (2020)
  - Total: 62
  - Density: 14.3/sq mi (5.51/km^{2})
- Time zone: UTC-8 (Pacific (PST))
  - Summer (DST): UTC-7 (PDT)
- ZIP code: 89043
- FIPS code: 32-77200
- GNIS feature ID: 2583960

Ursine is an unincorporated community and census-designated place in Lincoln County, Nevada, United States. It is located in the foothills of the White Rock Mountains on Eagle Valley about two miles downstream from the Eagle Valley Reservoir in Spring Valley State Park. The population was 62 at the 2020 census.

A post office was established at Ursine in 1895, and remained in operation until 1959. The community was named after the valley in which it is located.

== Demographics ==
Historical population
Census	Pop.	Note	%±
2020	62		—
U.S. Decennial Census
