= Pioche, Nevada =

Unincorporated town in Nevada, United States

- Unincorporated town
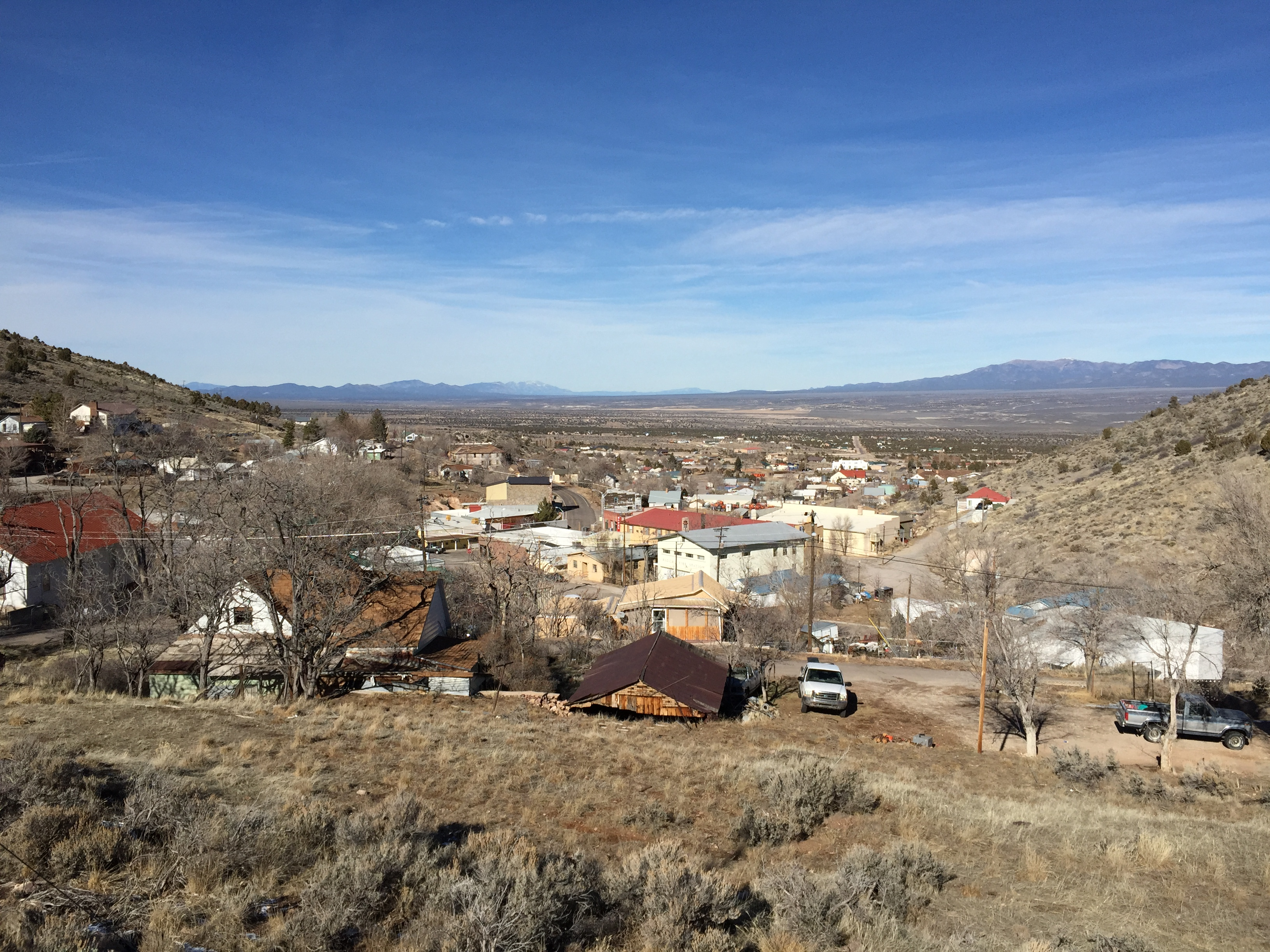
- View of Pioche, looking northeastward

- Location in the state of Nevada
- Coordinates: 37°57′07″N 114°26′36″W
- Country: United States
- State: Nevada
- County: Lincoln

Area
  - Total: 6.15 sq mi (15.94 km^{2})
  - Land: 6.15 sq mi (15.94 km^{2})
  - Water: 0 sq mi (0.00 km^{2})
- Elevation: 5,656 ft (1,724 m)

Population (2020)
  - Total: 933
  - Density: 151.6/sq mi (58.53/km^{2})
- Time zone: UTC−8 (Pacific (PST))
  - Summer (DST): UTC−7 (PDT)
- ZIP code: 89043
- Area code: 775
- FIPS code: 32-57400
- GNIS feature ID: 2583951

Nevada Historical Marker
- Reference no.: 5

Pioche (/ˌpiˈoʊtʃ/) is an unincorporated town in Lincoln County, Nevada, United States, approximately 180 miles (290 km) northeast of Las Vegas. U.S. Route 93 is the main route to Pioche and bypasses the town center just to the east, with Nevada State Route 321 and Nevada State Route 322 providing direct access. Pioche is the county seat of Lincoln County. Pioche is named after François Louis Alfred Pioche, a San Francisco financier and land speculator originally from France. The town's population was 1,002 at the 2010 census.

== History ==
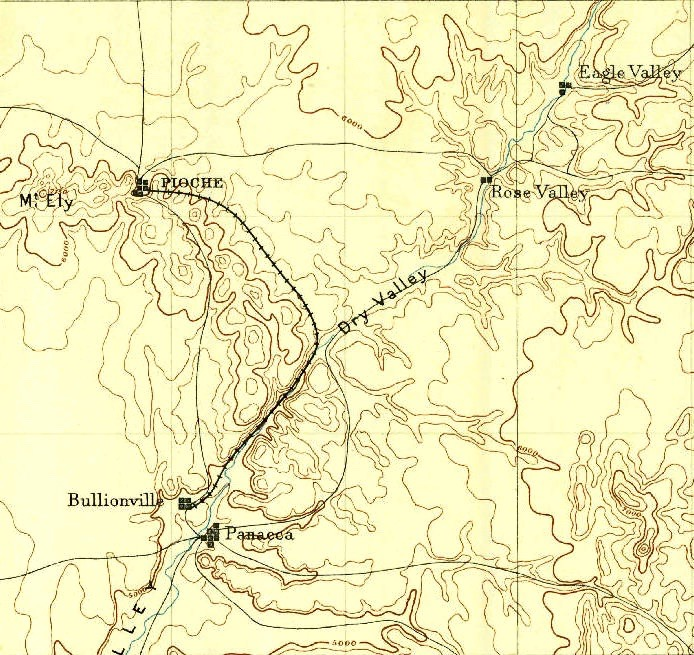
Map

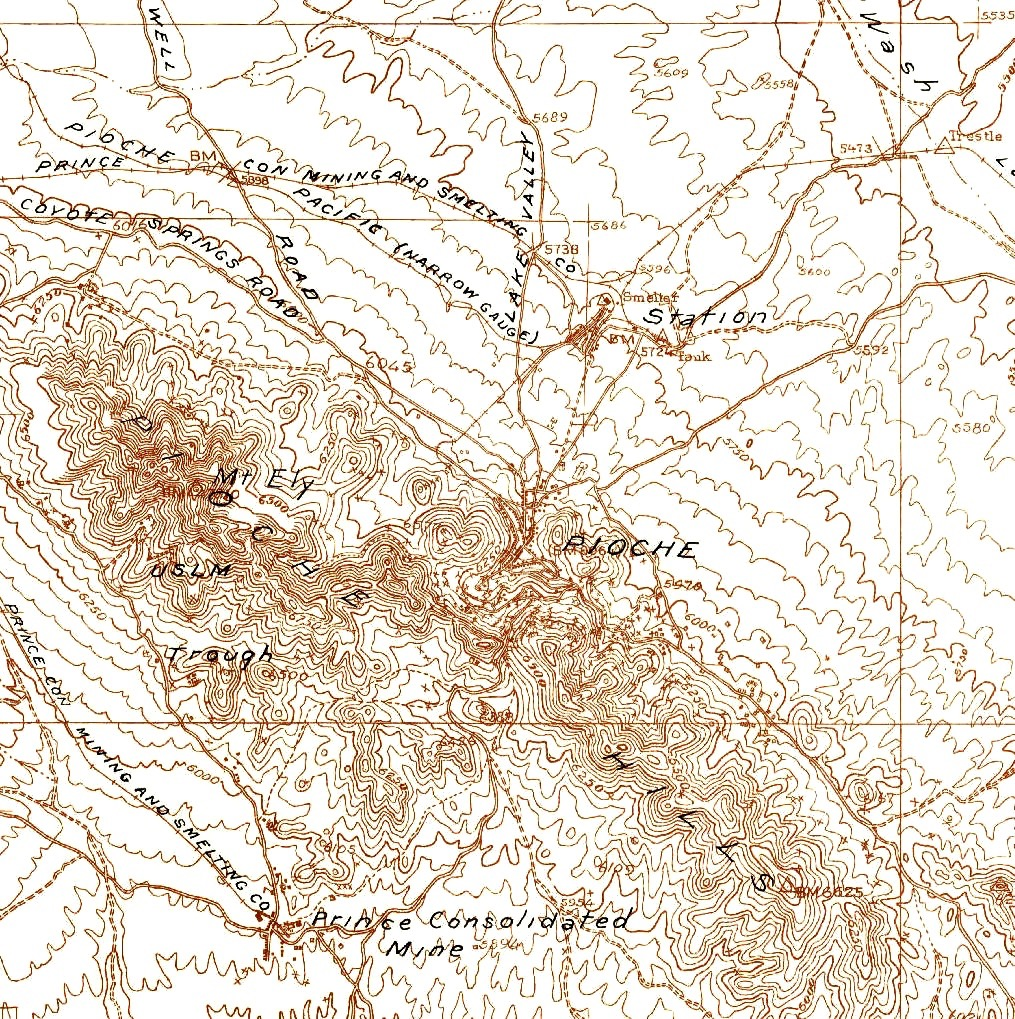
Three different railroads tied the community to the outside world in 1921

The first modern settlement of the area occurred in 1864 with the opening of a silver mine. The settlers abandoned the area when local Indian tribes launched a series of raids and massacres. Recolonization was launched in 1868, after the Indian raids were stopped and François Pioche bought the town in 1869. By the early 1870s, Pioche had grown larger to become one of the most important silver-mining towns in Nevada. Because of the town's remoteness which had earlier allowed the Indian raids to occur, Pioche had a reputation for being one of the roughest towns in the Old West.

Due mostly to confusion over the exact location of mining claims, mine owners finally resorted to hiring guards. In 1872, Tom and Ed Newland hired gunmen to take over the very profitable mine owned by William H. Raymond and John Ely. They in turn hired four more men who during a raid in the middle of the night killed one of the guards and drove off the remainder. One of the four hired gunmen, Michael Casey, killed miner Tom Gossen after refusing to pay interest on a $100 loan. Before he died the next day, Gossen left a $5,000 reward to the man who killed Casey. Jim Leavy swore Casey had not shot Gossen in self-defense, and Casey challenged Leavy to get his gun. The two men met in front of Felsenthal's store. Leavy shot Casey and then beat him to death with his pistol. Leavy in turn was wounded by David Neagle, who shot Leavy through the cheeks, leaving him permanently disfigured.

It was reported that nearly 60 percent of the homicides reported in Nevada during 1871–72 took place in and around Pioche. Local lore says 72 men were killed in gunfights before the first natural death occurred in the camp. This legend is immortalized by the creation of Boot Hill, now a landmark in the city.

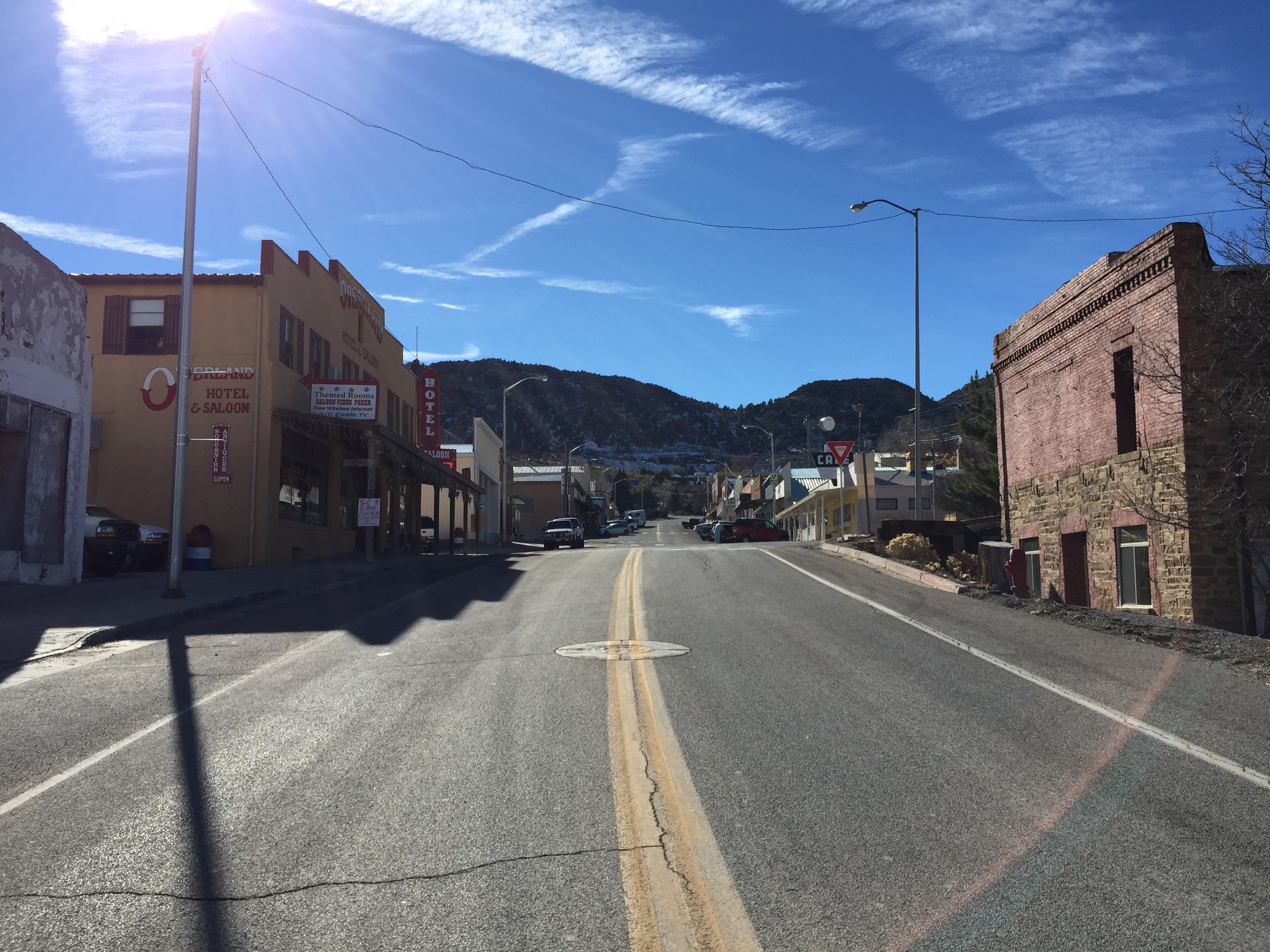
Main Street in Pioche

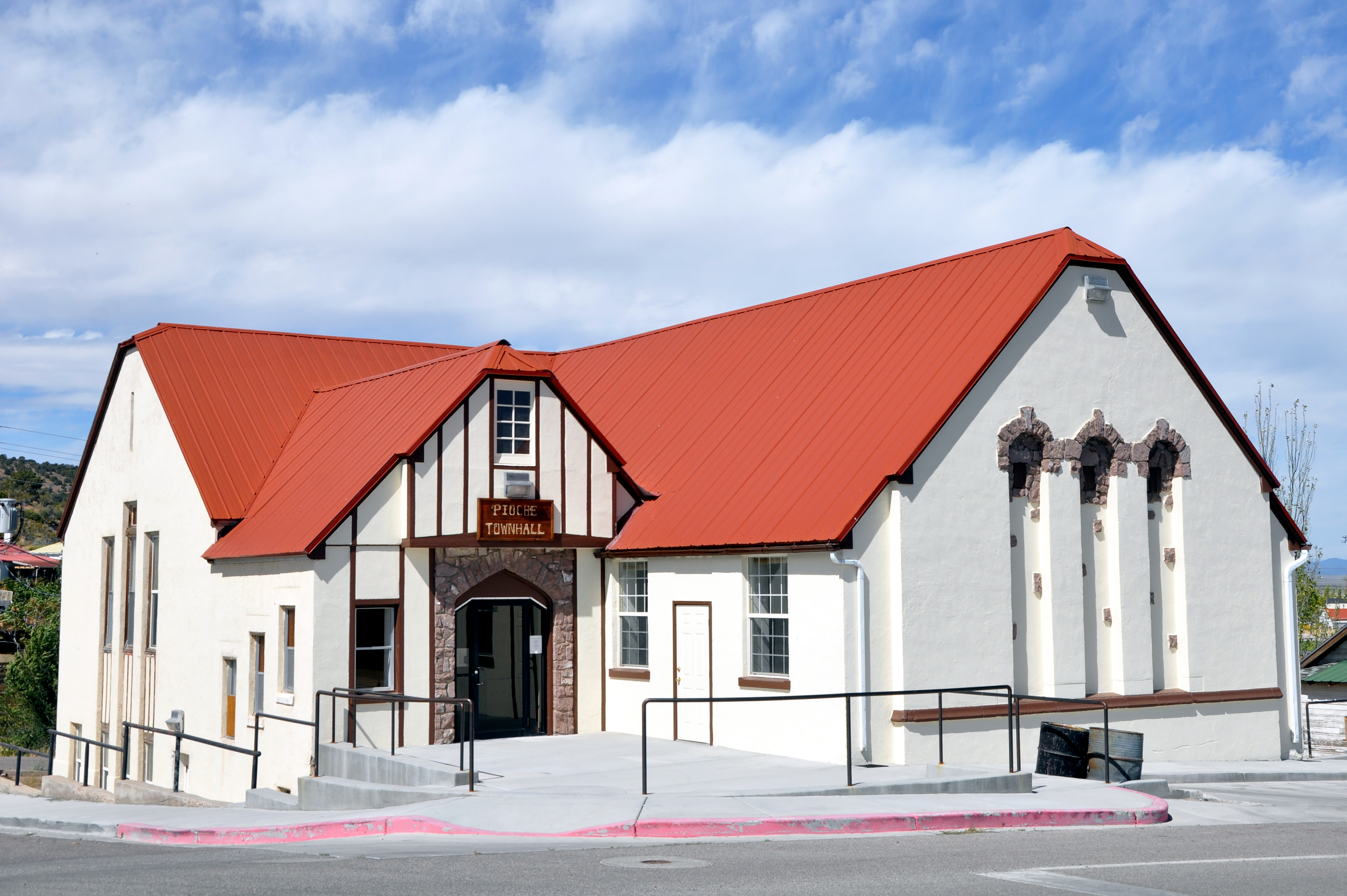
Pioche Town Hall

== Climate ==
Pioche has a cool semi-arid climate (Köppen BSk) bordering on a humid continental climate (Dfa/Dsa), due to its high altitude and exposure to rain-bearing winds. The high elevation means summers are much cooler than in Clark County, with temperatures of 100 °F or 37.8 °C reached upon only one afternoon every five years, and 90 °F or 32.2 °C reached only upon 23.1 afternoons. The hottest month recorded was July 2005, with a mean maximum of 93.0 °F or 33.9 °C, a record hot day of 105 °F (40.6 °C) on July 17, and nine days above the century mark from July 11 to 19. Although summers are mostly dry with mild nights, it is not unknown for "Arizona rains" to penetrate into Lincoln County during July and August, as happened in August 1945 when 5.01 inches (127.3 mm) of rain fell on a total of eleven "wet" days, and during August 1955 when seventeen days saw at least 0.01 inches or 0.3 millimeters of rain.

The fall season sees warm days and cold nights: the freeze-free period usually extends from May 17 to October 10, although temperatures below 0 °F or −17.8 °C are very rare even during winter with an average of 1.1 mornings falling this low; the coldest temperature in Pioche has been −11 °F (−23.9 °C) on January 12, 1963. The coldest month has been January 1949 with a mean maximum of 27.7 °F (−2.4 °C), although in a normal winter only 10.3 afternoons will not top freezing. During the winter, days are cool to cold – although even in January 7.1 afternoons top 50 °F or 10 °C – and nights are very cold, although snowfall is extremely erratic. During the very wet and cold spell of January and February 1993, 98 inches or 2.5 meters of snow fell in Pioche; however, in warm, dry winters like 1999/2000, almost no snow may occur.

Climate data for Pioche, Nevada (1971–2000; extremes since 1939)
Month	Jan	Feb	Mar	Apr	May	Jun	Jul	Aug	Sep	Oct	Nov	Dec	Year
Record high °F (°C)	67 (19)	72 (22)	77 (25)	82 (28)	91 (33)	102 (39)	105 (41)	99 (37)	96 (36)	86 (30)	74 (23)	68 (20)	105 (41)
Mean daily maximum °F (°C)	41.8 (5.4)	45.9 (7.7)	51.2 (10.7)	59.3 (15.2)	68.4 (20.2)	79.7 (26.5)	86.7 (30.4)	84.6 (29.2)	76.5 (24.7)	65.0 (18.3)	50.9 (10.5)	43.3 (6.3)	62.8 (17.1)
Mean daily minimum °F (°C)	20.9 (−6.2)	24.0 (−4.4)	28.3 (−2.1)	34.3 (1.3)	43.1 (6.2)	52.0 (11.1)	58.7 (14.8)	56.8 (13.8)	49.2 (9.6)	38.3 (3.5)	27.6 (−2.4)	21.0 (−6.1)	37.9 (3.3)
Record low °F (°C)	−11 (−24)	−8 (−22)	4 (−16)	12 (−11)	21 (−6)	30 (−1)	43 (6)	38 (3)	25 (−4)	4 (−16)	2 (−17)	−8 (−22)	−11 (−24)
Average precipitation inches (mm)	1.50 (38)	1.59 (40)	1.83 (46)	0.95 (24)	1.17 (30)	0.52 (13)	0.92 (23)	1.27 (32)	0.96 (24)	1.14 (29)	0.94 (24)	0.97 (25)	13.76 (348)
Average snowfall inches (cm)	14.8 (38)	9.9 (25)	1.9 (4.8)	1.8 (4.6)	0.0 (0.0)	0.2 (0.51)	0.0 (0.0)	0.0 (0.0)	0.0 (0.0)	1.0 (2.5)	0.6 (1.5)	1.9 (4.8)	32.1 (81.71)
Average precipitation days (≥ 0.01 in)	5.1	5.3	6.3	3.9	5.0	3.0	3.9	5.2	3.6	4.0	3.3	3.9	52.5
Average snowy days (≥ 0.1 inch)	2.6	1.8	0.7	0.6	0.1	0.1	0.0	0.0	0.0	0.3	0.5	1.0	7.7
Source 1: National Oceanic and Atmospheric Administration
Source 2: National Weather Service, Las Vegas (records)

== Landmarks and attractions ==
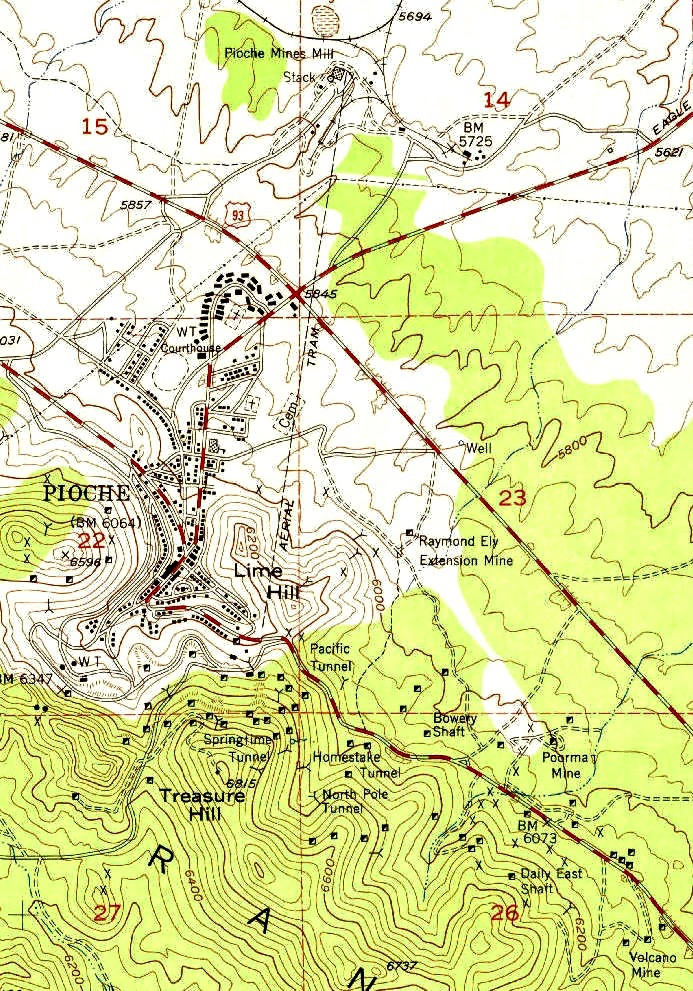
An aerial tramway carried buckets of ore from the mines to the Godbe Mill.

Pioche is known for its "Million Dollar Courthouse", built in 1872. The original cost of $88,000 far exceeded initial estimates and was financed, and refinanced with bonds totaling nearly $1 million. Pioche currently contains the county administrative offices and has one of the oldest grade schools in the state.

Two historic theaters site side by side on a hill overlooking downtown. Thompson's Opera House was built in 1873 and restored in 2009 while the Gem Theater was built in 1937 and ongoing restoration began in 2022.

Next door to the courthouse sits the old Mountain View Hotel, where President Herbert Hoover is said to have stayed in 1930. Built in 1895, the hotel served the lodging needs of dignitaries visiting Pioche on court business. Although the building no longer serves as a hotel, it is an example of turn-of-the-century western architecture. There is another hotel, the Overland, which is still operating, with 14 themed rooms on the second floor over the main saloon.

An aerial tramway carried buckets of ore from the mines to the Godbe Mill. The tramway ran during the 1920s and 1930s and was used for the transportation of silver and nickel ore. The abandoned tramway used cables which still stretch over parts of the town, with some original ore buckets intact.

During Labor Day in September, the population swells for events including fireworks, history-based theater and mining car filling contests called "mucking events." In December, the town holds a public Christmas tree lighting.

The town of Pioche is Nevada Historical Marker 5.

== Demographics ==
Historical population
Census	Pop.	Note	%±
2010	1,007		—
2020	933		−7.3%
U.S. Decennial Census

== Notable persons ==
- Nellie Cashman, Boarding house operator and community activist
- Dr. Quincy Fortier, fertility doctor who inseminated patients with his own sperm for over 40 years.
- David Neagle, Old West deputy U.S. Marshal

== See also ==
- Bullionville, Nevada
- Pioche Formation
