= Lake Valley (Nevada) =

Valley in Nevada, United States

- Location within Nevada
- Length: 60 mi (97 km) N-S

Geography
- Country: United States
- State: Nevada
- Region: Great Basin
- County: White Pine
- Population centers: Pioche; Pony Springs
- Borders on: List: Schell Creek Range; Fortification Range; Wilson Creek Range; Fairview Range; Bristol Range
- Coordinates: 38°19′08″N 114°36′24″W
- River: Patterson Wash-South Valley
- Interactive map of Lake Valley

Lake Valley is a 60-mile (97 km) long valley in northeast Lincoln County, Nevada. The North Lake Valley is an endorheic basin; South Lake Valley contains Patterson Wash, a northwest headwater tributary to the Meadow Valley Wash; the northeast headwater section of Meadow Valley Wash is a shorter drainage coming from the south of the Wilson Creek Range, the northeast border of South Lake Valley.

The water divide between the North & South sub-valleys is about halfway between both sections. Squaw Knoll is on the east crest of the water divide; the valley's water divide is part of the Great Basin Divide of southeast Nevada.

About 6 mi (10 km) of the North Lake Valley extends into south White Pine County.

== Description ==
=== Squaw Knoll and Pony Springs, Nevada ===
Pony Springs, Nevada is adjacent the water divide which separates the North and South Lake Valleys. At the divide the valley narrows to only about 2.5 mi (4 km), as Squaw Knoll, 6,544 feet (1,995 m), is on the divide's east. The water divide, and center of both valley sub-regions, is about 7 mi (11 km) southeast of Pony Springs. The town is located on U.S. 93 which traverses the entire mountain foothills of the valley's western perimeter. The highway leaves South Lake Valley at Pioche in the mountains, then turns due south. Route 93 travels north beyond North Lake Valley to meet U.S. Route 50 in Nevada, about 25 mi (40 km) further.

=== North Lake Valley, endorheic ===
North Lake Valley only contains flatlands; the North Valley is slightly narrower than the South Valley, and only about 9 mi (14 km) at its widest. The North Valley is due north-south trending, and bordered on the east by the short, and narrow, north-south Fortification Range, which lies at the extreme southeast of the extensive north-south Spring Valley.

=== South Lake Valley ===
South Lake Valley is about a 30 mi (48 km) long stretch until it reaches Hamlight Canyon and the Meadow Valley Wash; the southeast-trending part is about 20 mi. Patterson Wash drains south, and then southeast along the west of the valley's center. It originates at the north-south water divide, and its origin lies due east of the Fairview Range, the small range on the center-west water divide perimeter. Patterson Wash then drains due southeast along the northeast of the Bristol Range, past Pioche and intercepts Meadow Valley Wash 5 mi (8 km) further.
