= Cave Valley =

Cave Valley may refer to:

== Places ==
In the United States

- Cave Valley, a former name of Cool, California
- Cave Valley (Nevada), a valley in Nevada
- Cave Valley, Nevada, a ghost town

Elsewhere

- Cave Valley, Jamaica
