= Far South Egans Wilderness =

Protected area in Nevada, United States

- IUCN category Ib (wilderness area)
- Location within Nevada Location within the United States
- Location: Lincoln County, Nevada and Nye County, Nevada, USA
- Nearest city: Ely, NV
- Coordinates: 38.4587142°N 115.2274519°W
- Area: 36,299 acres (147 km^{2})
- Established: 2004
- Governing body: U.S. Department of Interior Bureau of Land Management

Far South Egans Wilderness is a protected wilderness area on the southern end of the Egan Range in the U.S. state of Nevada. Established in 2004 by the U.S. Congress, the area is managed by the U.S. Bureau of Land Management. This mountain wilderness rises from 5,800 feet (1767 m) to 9,823 feet (2994 m) to form stunning multi-colored limestone cliffs. Wildlife in the area includes mule deer, elk, desert bighorn sheep, mountain lions, golden eagles and ferruginous hawks that live among the rare mix of ponderosa pine and ancient bristlecone pine groves in the higher elevations of the mountains.

== See also ==
- List of U.S. Wilderness Areas
