= Dry valley (disambiguation) =

A dry valley is a valley which holds no water.

Dry valley or Dry Valley may also refer to:

- Dry Valley, Nevada, a community in the United States
- Dry Valley (novel), a novel by Ivan Bunin
- Dry Valley (Reynolds County, Missouri), a valley in Missouri
- McMurdo Dry Valleys in Antarctica, some of the driest places on Earth
