= Fortification Range Wilderness =

Wilderness area in Nevada, United States

- IUCN category Ib (wilderness area)
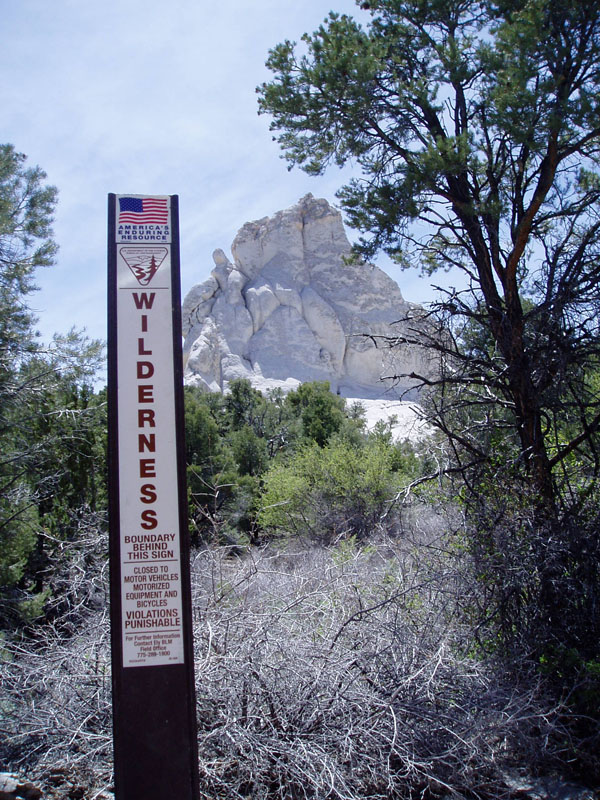

- Location within the United States
- Location: Lincoln County, Nevada, USA
- Nearest city: Lund, Nevada
- Coordinates: 38.56°N 114.456°W
- Area: 30,656 acres (12,406 ha)
- Established: 2004
- Governing body: U.S. Bureau of Land Management

Fortification Range Wilderness is a 30,656-acre (12,406 ha) wilderness area in Lincoln County, in the U.S. state of Nevada. The Wilderness lies approximately 50 miles (80 km) southeast of the town of Ely and is administered by the U.S. Bureau of Land Management.

The Fortification Range Wilderness protects the 13.5-mile (21.7 km) long Fortification Range, a low mountain range composed almost entirely of volcanic materials. Most of the range is gentle ridges, though the north end is very rugged and precipitous and contains sheer cliffs and massive outcrops.

== Flora and fauna ==
A variety of vegetation grows in the Fortification Range Wilderness, including ponderosa pine, pinyon pine, juniper, aspen, and cottonwood trees in the northern portion of the Wilderness. The southern portion is densely forested with pinyon and juniper. Common wildlife found the Wilderness includes mule deer, antelope, mountain lion, and various raptors.

== Recreation ==
Popular recreational activities in the Fortification Range Wilderness include hiking, camping, backpacking, photography, nature study, horseback riding, fishing and hunting.

== See also ==
- List of wilderness areas in Nevada
- List of U.S. Wilderness Areas
- Wilderness Act
