= Pioche Hills =

Mountain range in Nevada, United States

- Location within Nevada

Highest point
- Peak: Mount Ely
- Elevation: 7,312 ft (2,229 m)
- Coordinates: 37°56′01″N 114°28′53″W

Geography
- Country: United States
- State: Nevada
- District: Lincoln County
- Range coordinates: 37°55′19″N 114°27′22″W
- Topo map: USGS Pioche

The Pioche Hills are a mountain range in Lincoln County, Nevada. The historic Pioche silver mining district is centered in the Pioche Hills and extends into the adjacent Bristol and Highland Ranges to the west.
