= Schell Creek Range =

Mountain range in Nevada, United States

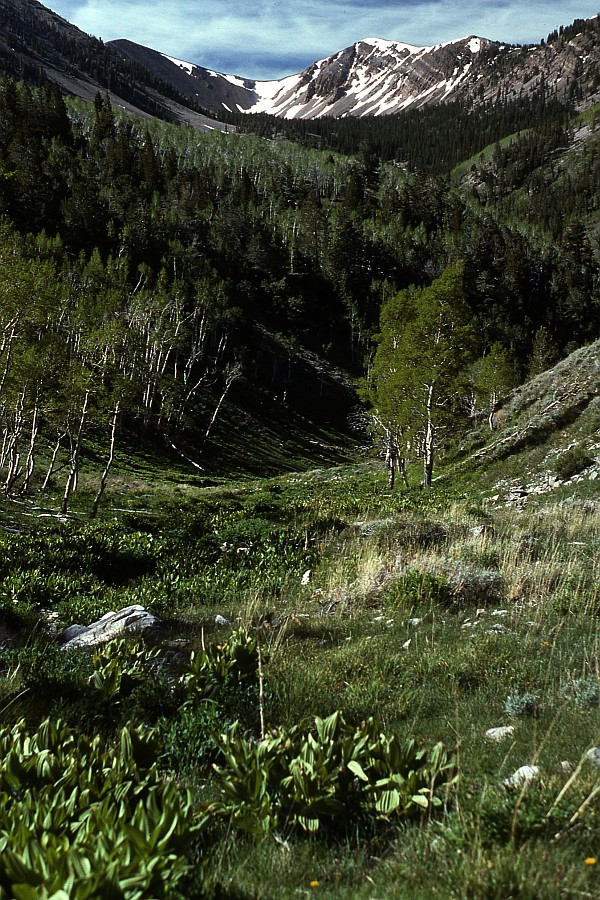

Highest point
- Peak: North Schell Peak
- Elevation: 11,883 ft (3,622 m)
- Coordinates: 39°24.8′N 114°35.97′W

Dimensions
- Length: 132 mi (212 km) North-South

Geography
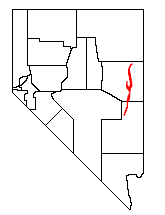
- The southern tip of the Schell Creek Range is on the Great Basin Divide along the White River (Nevada) basin.
- Location: Schellbourne Pass
- Country: United States
- State: Nevada
- Wilderness areas: High Schells Wilderness; Mount Grafton Wilderness; Becky Peak Wilderness
- Range coordinates: 39°48′20″N 114°38′55″W
- Borders on: W: Steptoe Valley; E: Lake Valley (Nevada)

The Schell Creek Range is a linear mountain range in central White Pine County, in east-central Nevada. Its length is approximately 132 miles (212 km) in a north-south direction. Most of the range is contained within the Humboldt-Toiyabe National Forest, with some of the range also included in the High Schells Wilderness.

The range comprises two major groups of peaks. The southern section rises from a point near Burnt Peak in Lincoln County, reaching the summit of Mt. Grafton, 10,990 feet (3,350 m), just north of the border with White Pine County. To the west are remote Cave Valley and the Egan Range, while to the east are U.S. Route 93 and the Fairview Range (Lincoln County). North of Mt. Grafton, the range drops quickly to a line of lower summits, eventually reaching 7,723-foot (2,354 m) Connors Pass. That is where U.S. Route 50, the "Loneliest Highway in America", crosses the range, connecting the nearby community of Ely with the Great Basin National Park and west-central Utah.

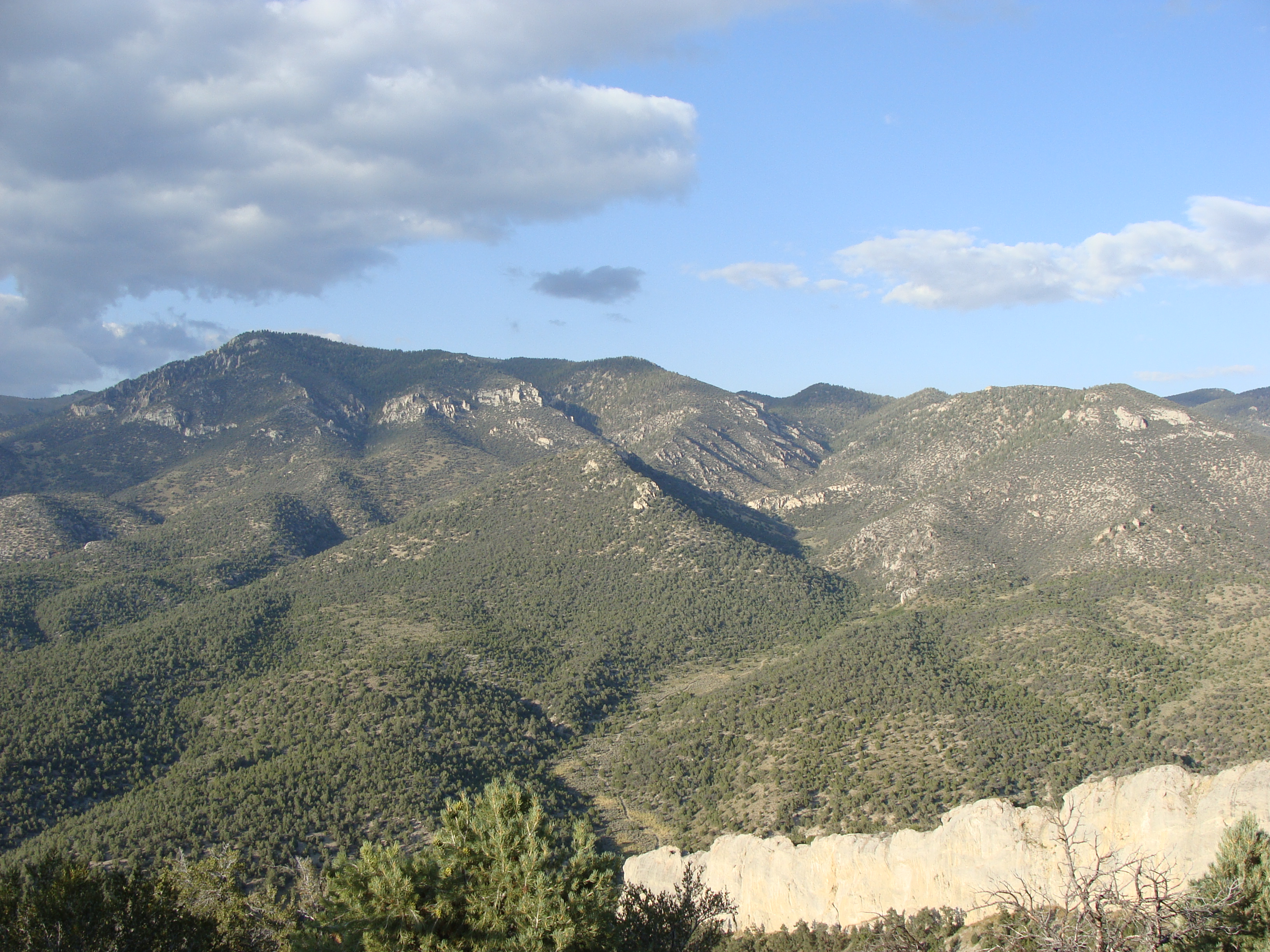
View of the Schell Creek Range running through Cave Lake State Park

North of Connors Pass the range continues into its higher northern section. To the west is Ely, Nevada, while to the east are Spring Valley and the high Snake Range, (including Great Basin National Park, Wheeler Peak, and Mt. Moriah). Within this section of the Schell Creek Range are Cave Lake State Park and the scenic road over Success Summit into Duck Creek Basin. The crest continues to rise, reaching South Schell Peak at 11,785 feet (3,592 m), Taft Peak at 11,734 feet (3,577 m), and North Schell Peak which, at 11,883 feet (3,622 m), is the high point of the range. Nearby are the Timber Creek and Berry Creek campgrounds (and trailheads).

The range then makes a slow descent to lower elevations, dropping to Schellbourne Pass at 7,984 ft (2,434 m), where the Overland Stage Line, the Pony Express, and the Transcontinental Telegraph made their way through the Great Basin. Just west of the range was the Egan Canyon Pony Express Station. From there, the range ascends to Becky Peak at 10,008 feet (3,050 m) before quickly descending to the floor of Steptoe Valley near Lages Station.

== Climate ==
Berry Creek is a SNOTEL weather station situated on the western face of South Schell Peak, at an elevation of 9100 feet (2774 m). Berry Creek has a subalpine climate (Köppen Dfc).

Climate data for Berry Creek, Nevada, 1991–2020 normals, 1985-2020 extremes: 9100ft (2774m)
Month	Jan	Feb	Mar	Apr	May	Jun	Jul	Aug	Sep	Oct	Nov	Dec	Year
Record high °F (°C)	51 (11)	58 (14)	62 (17)	64 (18)	74 (23)	79 (26)	85 (29)	82 (28)	78 (26)	69 (21)	58 (14)	52 (11)	85 (29)
Mean maximum °F (°C)	45 (7)	48 (9)	53 (12)	59 (15)	66 (19)	74 (23)	78 (26)	76 (24)	71 (22)	62 (17)	52 (11)	44 (7)	78 (26)
Mean daily maximum °F (°C)	31.7 (−0.2)	33.2 (0.7)	38.8 (3.8)	43.2 (6.2)	52.0 (11.1)	62.8 (17.1)	70.2 (21.2)	68.7 (20.4)	60.2 (15.7)	48.6 (9.2)	37.6 (3.1)	30.1 (−1.1)	48.1 (8.9)
Daily mean °F (°C)	22.9 (−5.1)	23.1 (−4.9)	28.0 (−2.2)	32.6 (0.3)	41.1 (5.1)	50.4 (10.2)	58.0 (14.4)	56.8 (13.8)	49.0 (9.4)	38.6 (3.7)	28.5 (−1.9)	21.7 (−5.7)	37.6 (3.1)
Mean daily minimum °F (°C)	14.0 (−10.0)	13.0 (−10.6)	17.2 (−8.2)	22.0 (−5.6)	30.2 (−1.0)	38.0 (3.3)	45.7 (7.6)	44.9 (7.2)	37.8 (3.2)	28.5 (−1.9)	19.4 (−7.0)	13.3 (−10.4)	27.0 (−2.8)
Mean minimum °F (°C)	−4 (−20)	−5 (−21)	0 (−18)	7 (−14)	17 (−8)	25 (−4)	38 (3)	36 (2)	24 (−4)	12 (−11)	0 (−18)	−5 (−21)	−10 (−23)
Record low °F (°C)	−16 (−27)	−18 (−28)	−9 (−23)	−6 (−21)	8 (−13)	13 (−11)	24 (−4)	27 (−3)	12 (−11)	−1 (−18)	−14 (−26)	−16 (−27)	−18 (−28)
Average precipitation inches (mm)	2.80 (71)	2.92 (74)	3.26 (83)	3.63 (92)	2.93 (74)	1.33 (34)	1.34 (34)	1.26 (32)	1.52 (39)	1.99 (51)	1.88 (48)	2.36 (60)	27.22 (692)
Source 1: XMACIS2
Source 2: NOAA (Precipitation)
