= Bennett Springs =

Bennett Springs or Bennett Spring may refer to:

- Bennett Springs, Missouri, an incorporated community of Missouri, US
- Bennett Spring State Park, a state park of Missouri, US
- Bennett Springs, Western Australia, a suburb of Perth, Western Australia
- Bennett Springs, Nevada, a census-designated place of Nevada, US
