= North Schell Peak =

Mountain in Nevada, United States

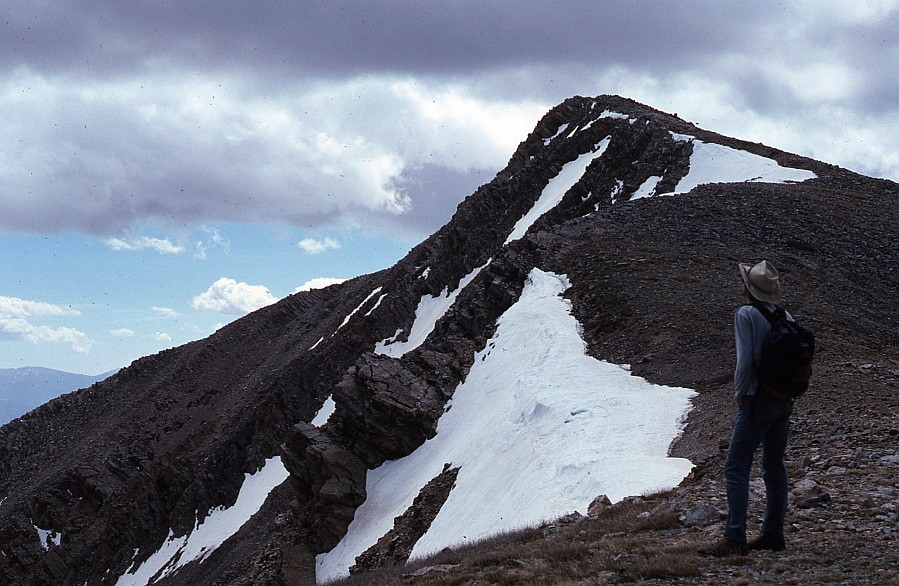

Highest point
- Elevation: 11,895 ft (3,626 m) NAVD 88
- Prominence: 5,403 ft (1,647 m)
- Listing: US most prominent peaks 93rd; Great Basin Peaks List
- Coordinates: 39°24′48″N 114°35′59″W

Geography
- Location within Nevada
- Location: White Pine County, Nevada, U.S.
- Parent range: Schell Creek Range
- Topo map: USGS North Schell Peak

Climbing
- Easiest route: Hike

North Schell Peak is the highest mountain in the Schell Creek Range of White Pine County, Nevada, United States. It is the ninth-highest mountain in the state, and also ranks as the fifth-most topographically prominent peak in the state. The summit is 19 miles (31 km) northeast of the community of Ely within the High Schells Wilderness of the Humboldt-Toiyabe National Forest.

== See also ==
- List of Ultras of the United States
