= Cave Valley, Nevada =

- Ghost town
- Location within Nevada Location within the United States
- Coordinates: 38°38′36″N 114°48′15″W
- Country: United States
- State: Nevada
- County: Lincoln
- Elevation: 6,457 ft (1,968 m)

Cave Valley is an extinct town in Lincoln County, in the U.S. state of Nevada.

== History ==
A post office was established at Cave Valley in 1926, and remained in operation until 1933. The community takes its name from its location in the Cave Valley.
