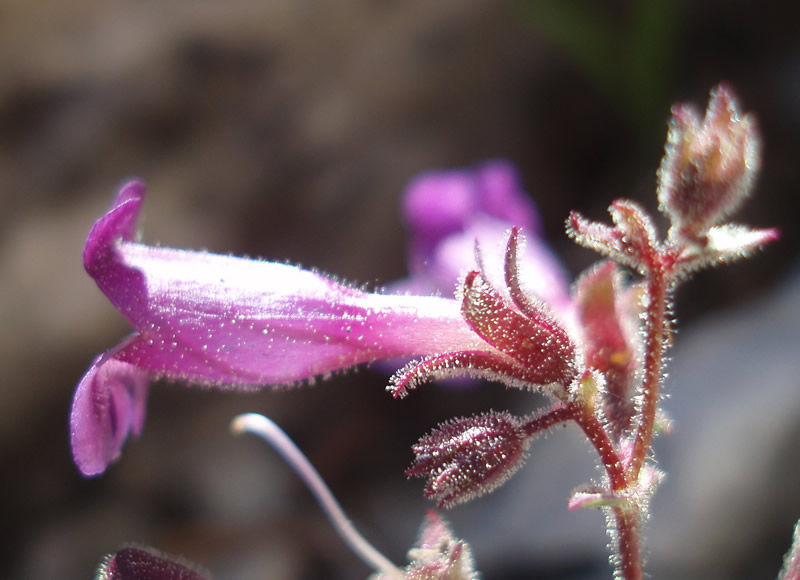

Conservation status
- Critically Imperiled (NatureServe)

Scientific classification
- Kingdom: Plantae
- Clade: Tracheophytes
- Clade: Angiosperms
- Clade: Eudicots
- Clade: Asterids
- Order: Lamiales
- Family: Plantaginaceae
- Genus: Penstemon
- Species: P. rhizomatosus

Binomial name
- Penstemon rhizomatosus N.Holmgren

= Penstemon rhizomatosus =

Species of flowering plant

Penstemon rhizomatosus is a rare species of flowering plant in the plantain family known by the common names Scheel Creek beardtongue and rhizome beardtongue. It is endemic to Nevada in the United States, where it occurs only in the Schell Creek Range of White Pine County.

This plant was first described in 1998. It is a perennial herb growing up to about 28 centimeters in maximum height. The clusters of stems arise from a woody caudex and thick taproot. The leaves are lance-shaped and borne on winged petioles. They are up to 3.5 centimeters long including the petioles and are coated in short white hairs. The inflorescence is a thyrse of flowers. The flower has a hairy, glandular calyx of sepals and a purple or reddish corolla between 1 and 2 centimeters long. The staminode is hairless. Blooming occurs in June through August.

This plant grows in a subalpine, or sometimes an alpine climate. It grows on rocky terrain, such as outcrops, scree slopes, and crevices in cliffs. The rock is usually limestone, or sometimes quartzite.

There are six known occurrences of this plant, all located on four peaks in the central Schell Creek Range. They occur within the Humboldt-Toiyabe National Forest.
