= Caselton, Nevada =

Caselton
- Unincorporated community
- Location within Nevada Location within the United States
- Coordinates: 37°55′8″N 114°29′6″W
- Country: United States
- State: Nevada
- County: Lincoln

Population (2020) (Note: Population of Blocks 3201 and 3242 within Census Tract 950100, in which Caselton is located)
  - Total: 30
- Time zone: UTC-8 (Pacific (PST))
  - Summer (DST): UTC-7 (PDT)
- ZIP code: 89043
- Area code: 775
- GNIS feature ID: 845399

Caselton is an unincorporated community and former mining town in Lincoln County, Nevada, United States, located southwest of Pioche on the western side of the Pioche Hills. Established in 1929, Caselton was the site of a mine shaft and a mill operated by the Combined Metals Reduction Company until ores at the site were depleted in 1950s, with usage of the mill finally ending in the 1970s. Alongside the abandoned structures of the mining site, a small residential community remains at the townsite, with a population of 30 as of the 2020 United States Census.

Nevada State Route 320, also known as the Caselton Mine Loop, passes north-south through the area, linking the community with U.S. Route 93.

== History ==
=== Establishment and mining operations ===
Mining in the Pioche area dates back to 1863, and the Combined Metals Reduction Company (CMR) would begin operations in the area in 1924. In 1929, CMR opened its second shaft—which primary mined silver, lead, and zinc—in the western side of the Pioche Hills, named the Caselton Shaft for J. A. Caselton of the National Lead Company. That year, a community called Caselton would be established at the new mine site.

In the late 1930s, infrastructure improvements around the townsite would be made. In 1936, the Hoover Dam on the Colorado River was completed. A transmission line running between the new dam and the Pioche area would be completed the following year, bringing electricity into Caselton. In 1938, the Union Pacific Railroad would purchase the Prince Consolidated Railroad, making rehabilitations and capacity improvements to it over the new next two years in preparation for the construction of a new ore processing mill in Caselton. As work on the railroad was finished, construction of the new mill would begin. The new floatation mill with the capacity of 500 tons would be opened in 1941, and its capacity would be increased to 1,000 in 1943.

CMR's operations of the mill at Caselton would continue normally until 1957 as ore in the mine was depleted. The mill would reopen again in 1964 to process ores mined at the nearby Pan American Mine until the mine shut down in 1978, finally ending operations at the mill; the railroad would also cease operations and be removed in 1984.

=== Present day and future of the site ===
A small population remains in Caselton in the residential subdivision of Caselton Heights. The ruins of the now-abandoned mine site remain inaccessible to the public, and the grounds are contaminated with arsenic and lead tailings.

In 2024, in partnership with the Nevada Department of Environmental Protection and the Multistate Environmental Response Trust, Lincoln County and the U.S. Environmental Protection Agency have proposed a project to clean up the contaminated Caselton site and repurpose it, with solar energy projects and the preservation of the mill as a landmark being listed as considerations for the reuse of the site.
