= Fortification Range =

Mountain range in Nevada, United States

- Location within Nevada

Highest point
- Elevation: 2,570 m (8,430 ft)
- Coordinates: 38°32.82′N 114°27.27′W

Geography
- Country: United States
- State: Nevada
- District(s): Lincoln and White Pine counties
- Range coordinates: 38°33′22″N 114°26′35″W
- Topo map: USGS The Gouge Eye

The Fortification Range is a mountain range in Lincoln and White Pine counties, Nevada. The range is a narrow linear range trending north-northwest with a length of 34 km (21 mi) and a width of about 8 km (5.0 mi). It is typical of the Basin and Range Province.

The Wilson Creek Range and the old townsite–mining camp of Atlanta lies to the southeast of the south end of the range. Spring Valley and the Snake Range lie to the east and the Limestone Hills to the southeast. To the west is Lake Valley and the Schell Creek Range. US Route 93 traverses Lake Valley to the west and crosses Lake Valley Summit pass between the Fortification and Schell Creek ranges.

Fortification Range was named from a fancied resemblance to a fort.
