= Fay, Nevada =

- Ghost town
- Location within Nevada Location within the United States
- Coordinates: 37°54′29″N 114°04′12″W
- Country: United States
- State: Nevada
- County: Lincoln
- Elevation: 6,926 ft (2,111 m)

Population (1910)
  - Total: 99
- Time zone: UTC-8 (Pacific (PST))
  - Summer (DST): UTC-7 (PDT)
- GNIS feature ID: 856025

Fay is a ghost town in Lincoln County, Nevada, United States.

The Fay post office was in operation from September 1900 until July 1924.

In 1910, the population of the Fay precinct was 99.

== Notable people ==
- Darr H. Alkire, United States Air Force general, was born in Fay.
