= Maynard Lake Fault =

Seismic fault in Nevada, United States

The Maynard Lake fault is a normal fault that runs through Lincoln County in southern Nevada. The Maynard Lake fault is the longest of the faults of the Pahranagat shear zone.
