= Ward Mountain =

Mountain in Nevada, United States

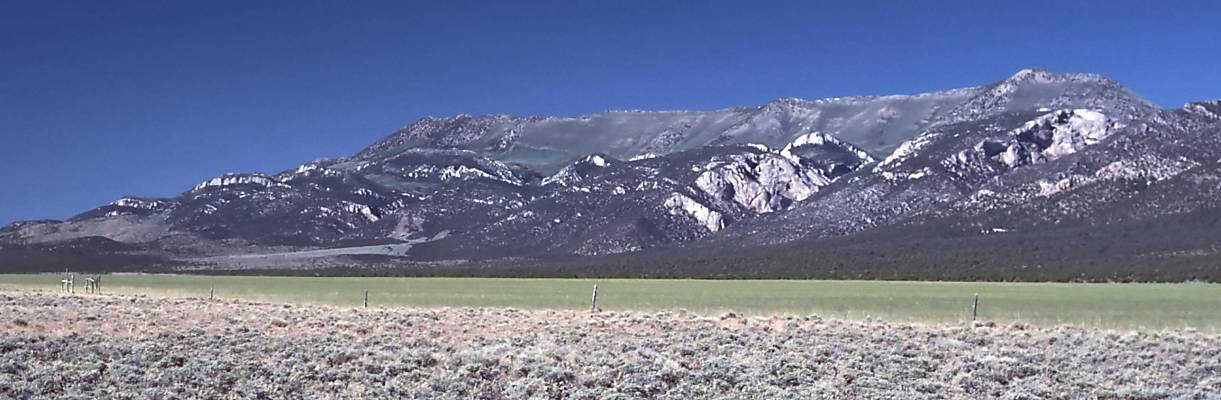
- Ward Mountain, looking north from the White River Valley

Highest point
- Elevation: 10,941 ft (3,335 m) NAVD 88
- Prominence: 3,656 ft (1,114 m)
- Coordinates: 39°06′01″N 114°55′14″W

Geography
- Location within Nevada
- Location: White Pine County, Nevada, U.S.
- Parent range: Egan Range
- Topo map: USGS Ward Mountain

Climbing
- Easiest route: Jeep trail

Ward Mountain is the high point of the Egan Range in south-central White Pine County of eastern Nevada. It ranks thirty-fourth among the most topographically prominent peaks in the state. The summit, part of a three mile long crest, is located just 10 miles (16 km) south of the city of Ely. The Ward Charcoal Ovens State Historic Park is located on the mountain's eastern flank.
