= Mount Wilson, Nevada =

- Census-designated place
- Location within the state of Nevada
- Coordinates: 38°14′47″N 114°27′06″W
- Country: United States
- State: Nevada
- County: Lincoln

Area
  - Total: 4.61 sq mi (11.93 km^{2})
  - Land: 4.61 sq mi (11.93 km^{2})
  - Water: 0 sq mi (0.00 km^{2})
- Elevation: 6,572 ft (2,003 m)

Population (2020)
  - Total: 26
  - Density: 5.6/sq mi (2.18/km^{2})
- Time zone: UTC-8 (Pacific (PST))
  - Summer (DST): UTC-7 (PDT)
- FIPS code: 32-49425
- GNIS feature ID: 2583944

Mount Wilson is a census-designated place in Lincoln County, Nevada, United States. As of the 2020 census, Mount Wilson had a population of 26.

== Geography ==
The CDP takes its name from Mount Wilson, a 9,315-foot (2,839 m) summit that rises to the east of the community and is part of the Wilson Creek Range. The CDP is located on Mount Wilson Road, 8 miles (13 km) east of U.S. Route 93, along which it is 23 miles (37 km) south to Pioche and 84 miles (135 km) north to Ely.

According to the U.S. Census Bureau, the Mount Wilson CDP has an area of 4.6 square miles (11.9 km^{2}), all of it land.

== Demographics ==
Historical population
Census	Pop.	Note	%±
2020	26		—
U.S. Decennial Census
