= Egan Range =

Mountain range in Nevada, United States

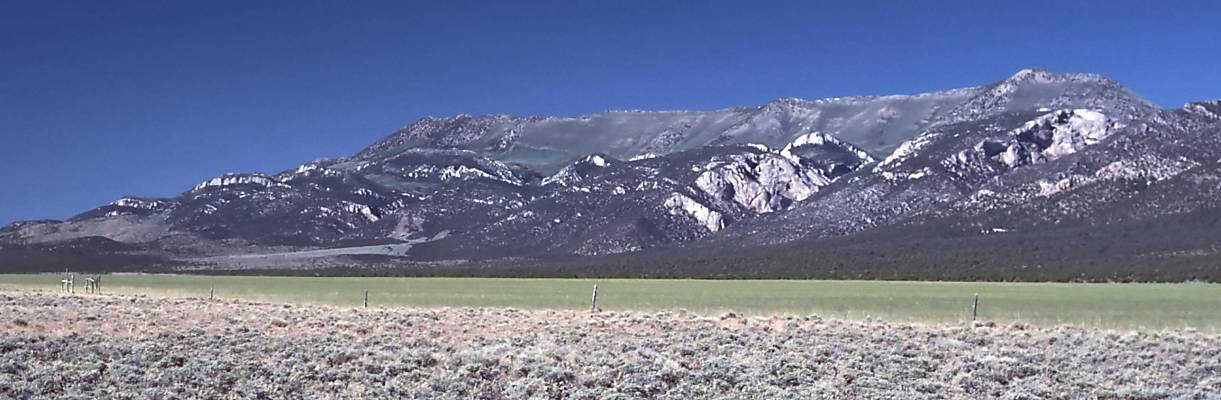
- Ward Mountain in the Egan Range, looking north from the White River Valley

Highest point
- Peak: Ward Mountain
- Elevation: 3,333 m (10,935 ft)

Naming
- Etymology: Howard Egan (Nevada surveyor)

Geography
- Location within Nevada
- Country: United States
- State: Nevada
- District: White Pine County
- Range coordinates: 39°26′20.771″N 115°1′45.090″W
- Topo map: USGS Robinson Summit

The Egan Range is a line of mountains in White Pine County, in eastern Nevada in the western United States. From Egan Creek near the historic community of Cherry Creek, the range runs south for approximately 108 miles (174 km), extending south of Shingle Peak in the northern part of Lincoln County. To the east are the large Steptoe Valley and the even longer Schell Creek Range. To the west are the White River Valley and the scenic White Pine Range. To the north is the Cherry Creek Range, while to the south is remote Cave Valley and the southern tip of the Schell Creek Range. It is named after the Egan Family that live in Montville.

The southern section of the range rises steadily, climbing to the high ridge of Ward Mountain. This crest is over 3 miles (4.8 km) long and, at elevations up to 10,936 feet (3,333 m), includes the highest point of the range. The mountains then descend rapidly to the north, dropping to elevations below 6200 feet near the community of Ely.

North of Ely the Egan Range rises again at Heusser Mountain (9,411 ft; 2,868 m), approximately 5 miles west of the community of McGill. This northern group of mountains (which might be considered as a separate range) continues to Telegraph Peak (9,918 ft; 3,023 m), and then descends to Egan Creek, almost merging with the Cherry Creek Range.

== See also ==
- Bristlecone Wilderness
- South Egan Range Wilderness
