= Darr H. Alkire =

Brigadier General, USAF

Darr Hayes Alkire
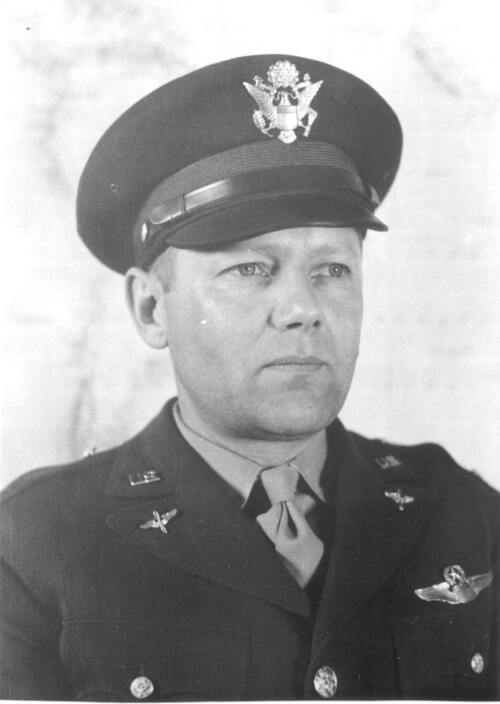
- Born: December 31, 1903; Fay, Nevada, US
- Died: July 22, 1977 (aged 73); Salt Lake City, Utah, US
- Burial place: National Memorial Cemetery of the Pacific, Honolulu
- Spouse(s): Ruth Eleanor McKee (1927-28); Alma Tate Robinson (1930+)
- Children: Michael Elliott Alkire (1927); Darryl Ann Alkire (1932); Jacqueline Hayes Alkire (1934); Barbara Hoogs (1925, step daughter)
- Military career
- Allegiance: United States
- Branch: United States Army Air Service; United States Army Air Corps; United States Army Air Forces; United States Air Force
- Service years: March 10, 1924-October 31, 1956
- Rank: Brigadier general
- Commands: 1937: 96th Bomb Squadron; 1942: 2d Bombardment Group; 1942: 100th Bombardment Group; 1943: 449th Bombardment Group; 1954: Newark Transportation Control Depot; 1954: 3101st Logistics Control Group
- Conflicts: World War II; Korean War
- Awards: Air Force Distinguished Service Medal (Army Design); Silver Star; Prisoner of War Medal; Distinguished Flying Cross; Air Medal with Oak Leaf Clusters

Darr Hayes Alkire (December 31, 1903 – July 22, 1977) was a pilot for the United States Army Air Service, United States Army Air Corps, the United States Army Air Forces, and the United States Air Force. He was the senior officer in command of the West Compound at Stalag Luft III prisoner of war camp after being shot down and captured in 1944.

== Early life ==
Alkire was born in Fay, Nevada, On December 31, 1903, to Chester and Henrietta Alkire. He had a younger sister, Helen, and younger brother, Ross. Alkire graduated from high School in Salt Lake City, Utah and spent two years studying at the University of Utah before joining the US Army.

== Air Force career ==
Alkire was appointed flying cadet at Brooks Field, Texas in 1924. After graduating from flight school, he was assigned to the 6th Pursuit Squadron at Wheeler Field Hawaii. In 1930, he became a flight instructor at March Field in California and then a flight instructor at Randolph Field in Texas. While stationed at Randolph, Alkire had a forced landing/accident in a Douglas BT-2C (#31-445) in Yorktown, Texas, on April 11, 1932.

During World War II, Alkire took over command of the 2d Bombardment Group in January 1942, and became the first commander of the 100th Bombardment Group in November 1942. In November 1943, Alkire became the commander of the 449th Bombardment Group. On December 18, 1943, Alkire piloted the Maui Maid (41-28623) to Grottaglie Airfield, making it the first 449th Bombardment Group B-24 to land in Italy. The Maui Maid was scrapped for parts after it struck an embankment on January 30, 1944.

=== Prisoner of war ===
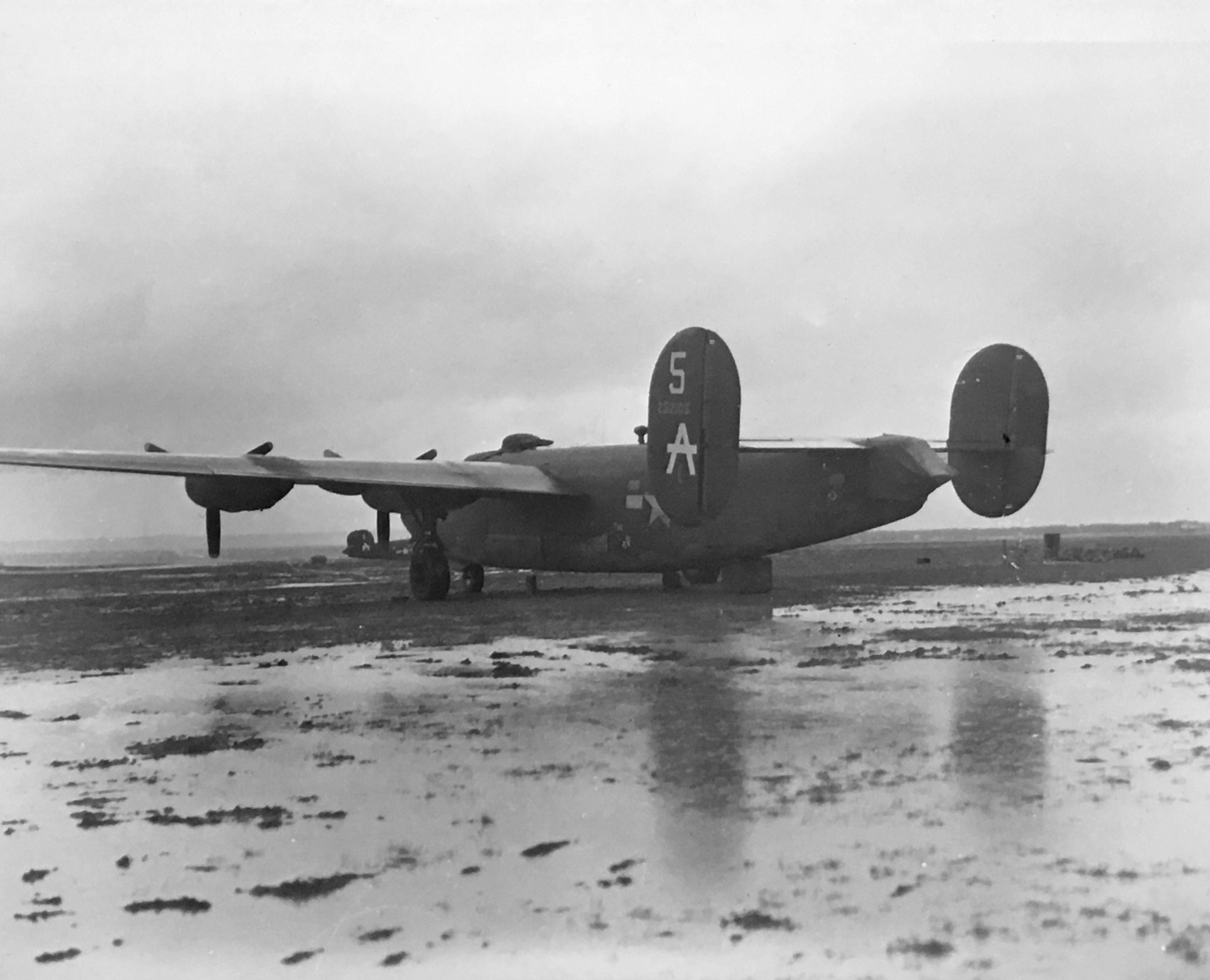
449th B-24 with Bar A painted on tail

Returning from his 19th B-24 Liberator mission on January 31, 1944, the Lurchin Urchin (41-29223) was shot down and crashed near Aeroporto Aviano. He was captured by the Germans and sent to Dulag Luft prisoner of war camp, then marched to Stalag Luft III. When the West Compound at Stalag Luft III opened on April 27, 1944, Alkire was made the senior officer in command until liberation in April 1945. Both a book and a movie were made about the Great Escape by prisoners in the North Compound of Stalag Luft III during Alkire's internment.

The USAAF filmed the Lurchin Urchin B-24 Liberator on the mission in which Colonel Alkire was shot down. On February 14, 1944, the B-24s in the 449th had a large "Bar A" painted on their tail in his honor.

== Airline career ==
In 1929, Alkire took a three-month leave from the Army Air Corp while stationed in Hawaii to help Inter-Island Airways begin flight operations. At the time, Inter-Island had a Bellanca Pacemaker and two Sikorsky S-38 flying boats. He was the third pilot hired, behind Charles Elliott and Carl Cover. The inaugural day of scheduled air-service in the Hawaiian Islands took place on Armistice Day, November 11, 1929. The ceremonies were attended by thousands of residents and led by Hawaii Territorial Governor Lawrence M. Judd and Inter-Island Airways founder Stan Kennedy. As champagne and floral leis christened the two Sikorky's for their voyage, Alkire flew overhead in the Bellanca capturing the scene on film. He then joined formation with 49 military aircraft for a fly-by as the two Sikorsky's departed.

== Personal life ==
In 1927, Alkire married Ruth McKee in Honolulu and had one child with her, Michael Alkire. They divorced in 1928. In 1930, Alkire married Maui born Alma Tate Robinson, who was mother to Barbara. They had two daughters together, Darryl Ann and Jacqueline. Alkire's B-24 Maui Maid was named in honor of Alma. Michael followed in his father's footsteps and became a pilot in the USAF, but lost his life in a plane crash at the age of 22. Michael is buried at Arlington National Cemetery.

== Later life ==
Alkire retired from the Air Force in 1956 and moved back to Salt Lake City. In 1958, Alkire appeared on a Salt Lake City television interview series regarding the Cold War, titled "What Security in the Rocket Age?" Alkire died on July 22, 1977, and is buried at the National Memorial Cemetery of the Pacific, in Honolulu, Hawaii.
