= Shingle Peak (Nevada) =

Mountain in Nevada, United States of America

- Location within Nevada

Highest point
- Elevation: 9,827 ft (2,995 m) NAVD 88
- Prominence: 2,863 ft (873 m)
- Coordinates: 38°30′30″N 114°55′40″W

Geography
- Location: Lincoln County, Nevada, U.S.
- Parent range: Egan Range
- Topo map: USGS SHINGLE PASS

Shingle Peak is the highest independent mountain completely within Lincoln County in Nevada, United States. The peak is part of the Egan Range and lies within the Humboldt-Toiyabe National Forest.
