= Fairview Range (Lincoln County) =

Mountain range in Nevada, United States

- Location within Nevada

Highest point
- Elevation: 2,034 m (6,673 ft)

Geography
- Country: United States
- State: Nevada
- District: Lincoln County
- Range coordinates: 38°14′26.849″N 114°38′33.996″W
- Topo map: USGS Fairview Peak

The Fairview Range is a mountain range in Lincoln County, Nevada.
