= Dry Valley, Nevada =

- Census-designated place
- Location within the state of Nevada
- Coordinates: 37°52′50″N 114°18′32″W
- Country: United States
- State: Nevada
- County: Lincoln

Area
  - Total: 3.78 sq mi (9.80 km^{2})
  - Land: 3.78 sq mi (9.80 km^{2})
  - Water: 0 sq mi (0.00 km^{2})
- Elevation: 5,148 ft (1,569 m)

Population (2020)
  - Total: 49
  - Density: 13/sq mi (5/km^{2})
- Time zone: UTC-8 (Pacific (PST))
  - Summer (DST): UTC-7 (PDT)
- FIPS code: 32-19800
- GNIS feature ID: 2583918

Dry Valley is a census-designated place in Lincoln County, Nevada, United States. As of the 2020 census it had a population of 49.

== Geography ==
The CDP is located in Dry Valley, a flat basin through which Meadow Valley Wash flows before it exits to the southwest into Condor Canyon. The CDP is located 9 miles (14 km) east of Pioche and is reached by Echo Dam Road, which continues east another 3 miles (5 km) to Echo Canyon State Park.

According to the U.S. Census Bureau, the Dry Valley CDP has an area of 3.8 square miles (9.8 km^{2}), all of it land.

== Demographics ==
Historical population
Census	Pop.	Note	%±
2020	49		—
U.S. Decennial Census

As of the 2020 census, Dry Valley had a population of 49 residents, of whom 41 were white, one was Native American or Alaska Native, two were of another race, and five were of two or more races.
