= Dry Valley (Reynolds County, Missouri) =

Valley in Missouri, United States

Coordinates: 37.2478257°N 90.9673466°W

Dry Valley is a valley in Reynolds County in the U.S. state of Missouri.

Dry Valley was so named for the fact the valley often runs dry.
