= Bristol Range =

Mountain range in Nevada, US

- Location within Nevada

Highest point
- Elevation: 2,722 m (8,930 ft)

Geography
- Country: United States
- State: Nevada
- District: Lincoln County
- Range coordinates: 38°2′4.861″N 114°36′4.994″W
- Topo map: USGS Bristol Range SE

The Bristol Range is a mountain range in Lincoln County, Nevada.
