= National Wilderness Preservation System =

Protection of wilderness areas in the US

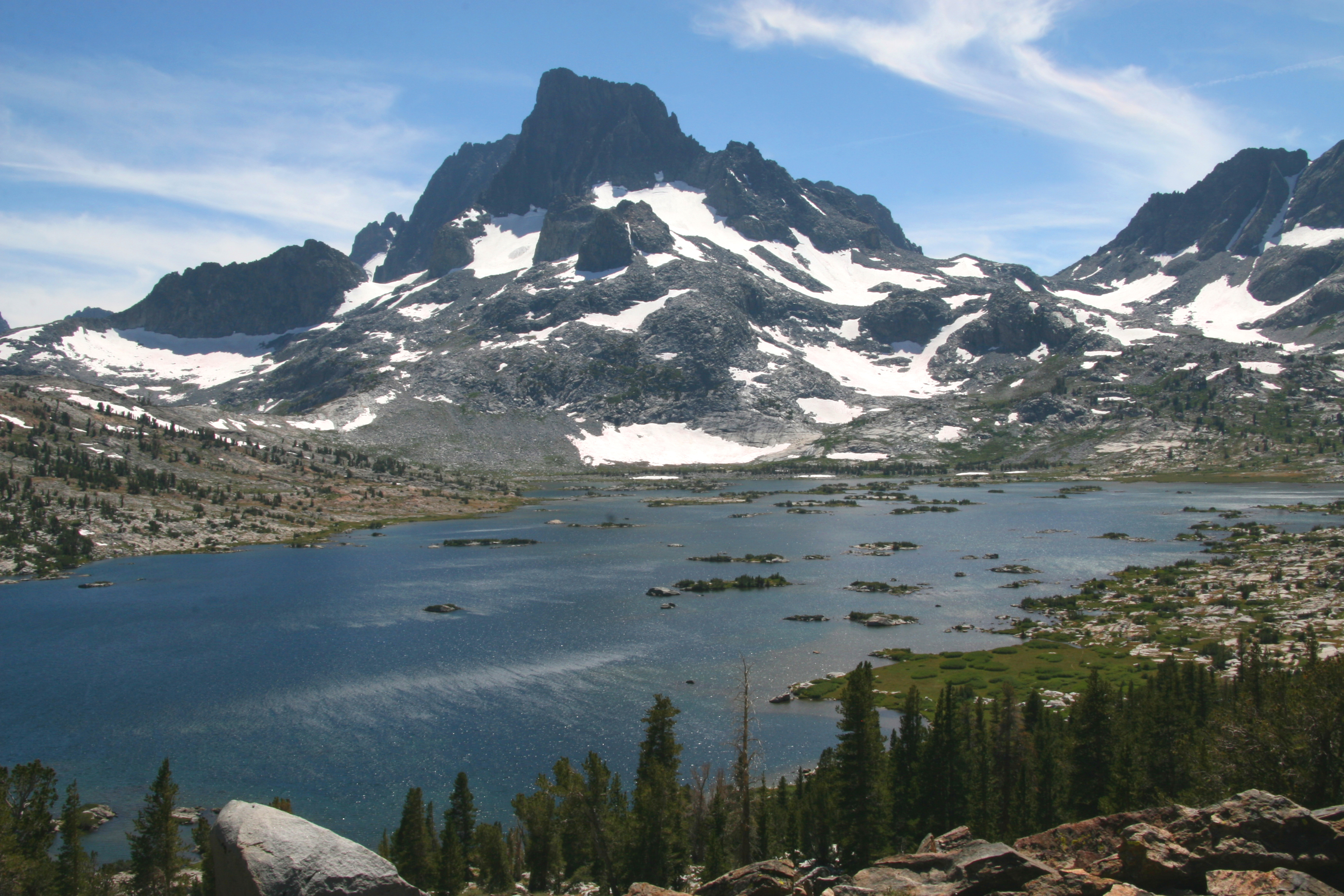
The Wilderness Act protects exceptionally undisturbed natural areas and scenery, such as in the Ansel Adams Wilderness.

The National Wilderness Preservation System (NWPS) of the United States protects federally managed wilderness areas designated for preservation in their natural condition. Activity on formally designated wilderness areas is coordinated by the National Wilderness Preservation System. Wilderness areas are managed by four federal land management agencies: the National Park Service, the U.S. Forest Service, the U.S. Fish and Wildlife Service, and the Bureau of Land Management.

The term wilderness is defined as "an area where the earth and community of life are untrammeled by man, where man himself is a visitor who does not remain" and "an area of undeveloped Federal land retaining its primeval character and influence, without permanent improvements or human habitation, which is protected and managed so as to preserve its natural conditions".

As of 2023, 806 wilderness areas have been designated, totaling 111,889,002 acres (45,279,873 ha; 452,798.73 km^{2}; 174,826.566 mi^{2}), which comprise about 4.5% of the land area of the United States.

== History ==
During the 1950s and 1960s, as the American transportation system was on the rise, concern for clean air and water quality began to grow. A conservation movement began to take place with the intent of establishing designated wilderness areas. Howard Zahniser created the first draft of the Wilderness Act in 1956. It took nine years and 65 rewrites before the Wilderness Act was finally passed in 1964. The Wilderness Act of 1964 (Public Law 88-577), which established the NWPS, was signed into law by President Lyndon B. Johnson on September 3, 1964. The Wilderness Act mandated that the National Park Service, U.S. Forest Service, and U.S. Fish and Wildlife Service review all federal lands under their jurisdiction for wilderness areas to include in the NWPS. The first national forest wilderness areas were established by the Wilderness Act itself. The Great Swamp in New Jersey became the first National Wildlife Refuge with formally designated wilderness in 1968. Wilderness areas in national parks followed, beginning with the designation of wilderness in part of Craters of the Moon National Monument in Idaho in 1970.

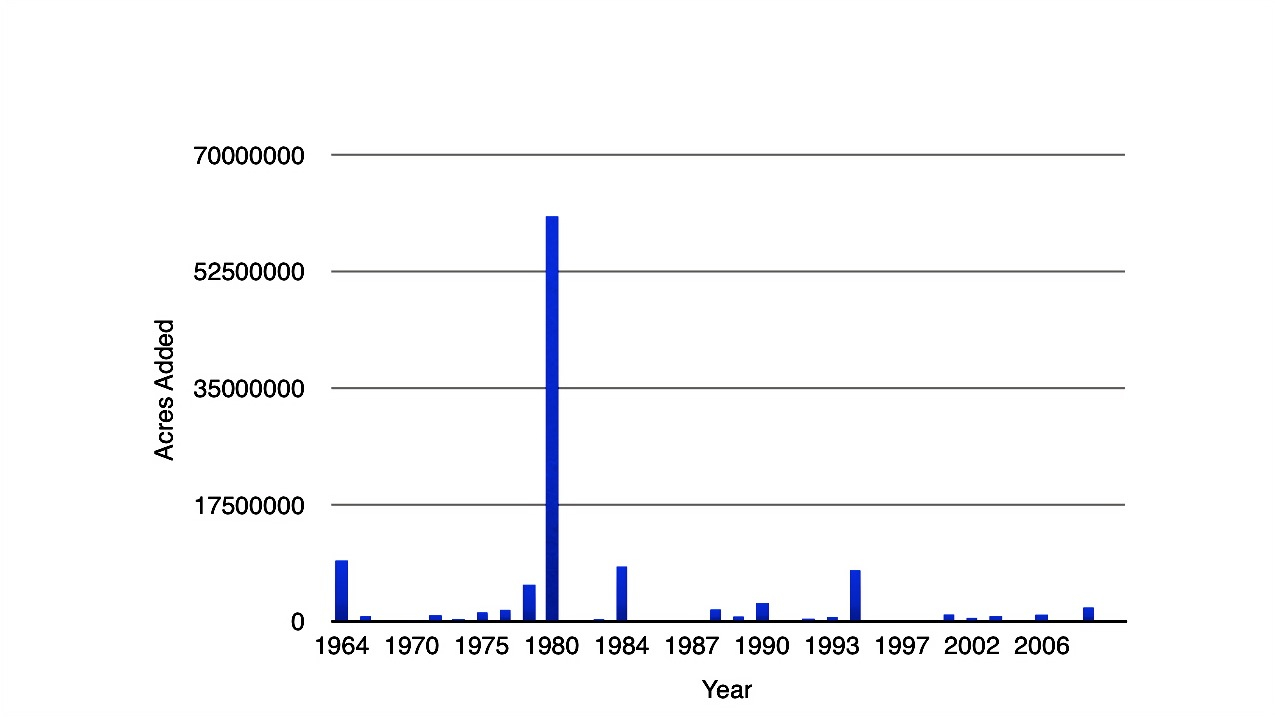
Acres of wilderness added by year

A dramatic spike in acreage added to the wilderness system in 1980 was due in large part to the Alaska National Interest Lands Conservation Act, signed into law by President Jimmy Carter on December 2, 1980. A smaller spike in 1984 came with the passage of many bills establishing national forest wilderness areas identified by the Forest Service's Roadless Area Review and Evaluation (RARE) process. The Bureau of Land Management was not required to review its lands for inclusion in the NWPS until after October 21, 1976, when the Federal Land Policy and Management Act of 1976 was signed into law; designation of wilderness areas on BLM lands began in 1978. Over 200 wilderness areas have been created within Bureau of Land Management administered lands since then, consisting of approximately 8.71 million acres (3,520,000 ha) in September 2015.

As of August 2008, 704 separate wilderness areas, encompassing 107,514,938 acres (43,509,752 ha), had become part of the National Wilderness Preservation System. On March 30, 2009, President Barack Obama signed into law the Omnibus Public Land Management Act of 2009. The legislation designated an additional 2 million acres (810,000 ha) in nine states as wilderness, representing the largest expansion of wilderness lands since 1994. The John D. Dingell Jr. Conservation, Management, and Recreation Act of 2019 added another 1.3 million acres (530,000 ha) in 43 new and expanded wilderness areas.

== Wilderness areas ==
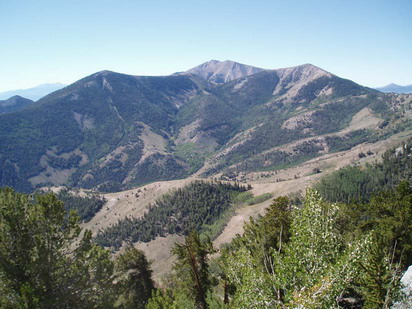
High Schells Wilderness, Nevada

On federal lands in the United States, Congress may designate an area as wilderness under the provisions of the Wilderness Act of 1964. Multiple agencies, including the Bureau of Land Management, the National Park Service, the Fish and Wildlife Service, and the U.S. Forest Service, are responsible for the submission of new areas that fit the criteria to become wilderness to Congress. Congress then reviews these cases on a state by state basis and determines which areas and how much land in each area will become part of the WPS. There have been multiple occasions in which Congress designated more federal land than had been recommended by the nominating agency. Where as the Wilderness Act stipulated that a wilderness area must be "administered for the use and enjoyment of the American people in such a manner as will leave them unimpaired for future use and enjoyment as wilderness", the Eastern Wilderness Areas Act of 1975, which added 16 national forest areas to the NWPS, allowed for the inclusion of areas that had been severely modified by human interference.

The Wilderness Act provides criteria for lands being considered for wilderness designation. Though there are some exceptions, the following conditions must be present for an area to be included in the NWPS: (1) the land is under federal ownership and management, (2) the area consists of at least five thousand acres of land, (3) human influence is "substantially unnoticeable", (4) there are opportunities for solitude and recreation, and (5) the area possesses "ecological, geological, or other features of scientific, educational, scenic, or historical value".

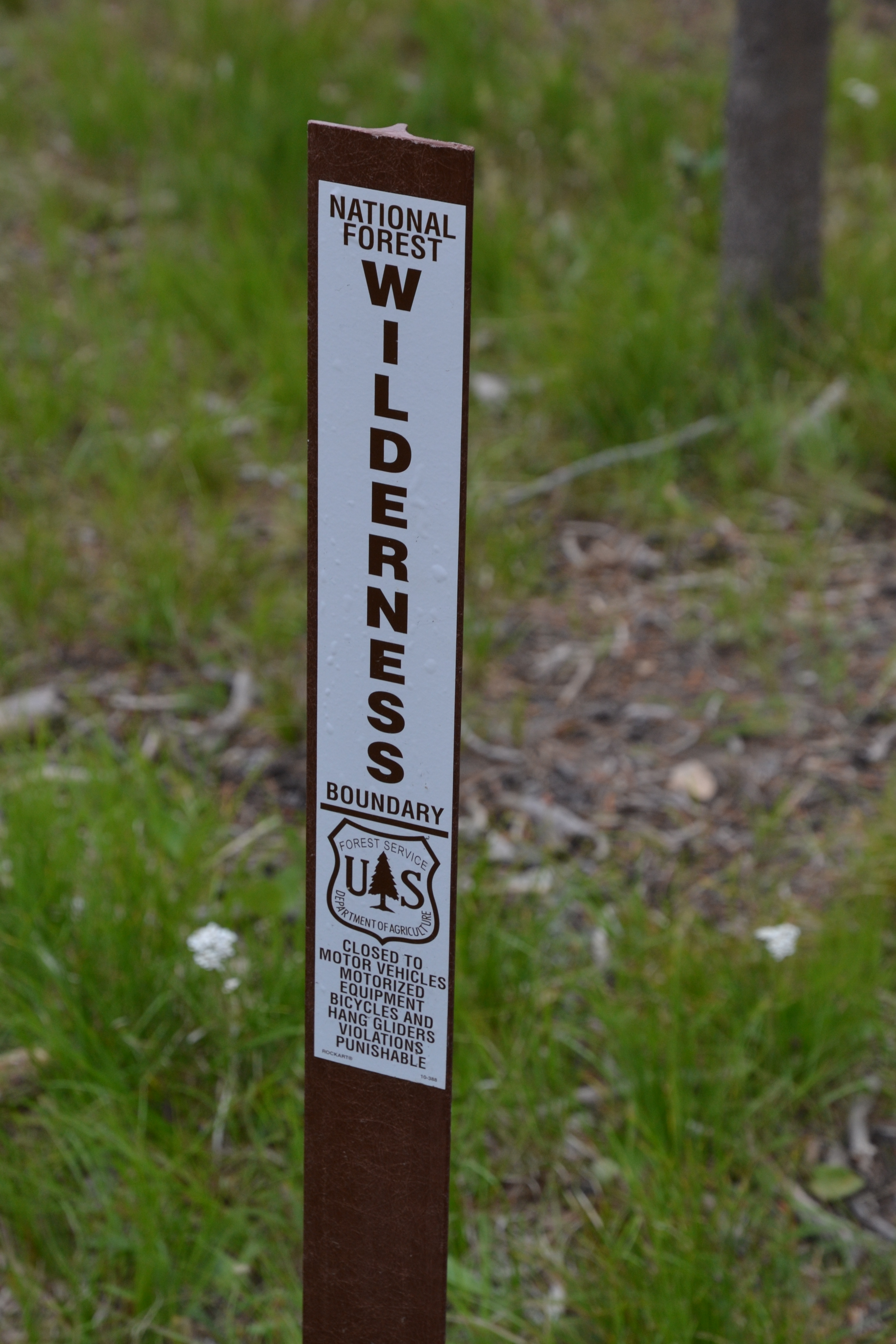
Wilderness boundary marker in Idaho

Wilderness areas are subject to specific management restrictions; human activities are limited to non-motorized recreation (such as backpacking, camping, hunting, fishing, horseback riding, etc.), scientific research, and other non-invasive activities. During these activities, patrons are asked to abide by the Leave No Trace policy. This policy sets guidelines for using the wilderness responsibly and leaving the area as it was before usage. These guidelines include: Packing all trash out of the wilderness, using a stove as opposed to a fire, camping at least 200 feet (61 m) from trails or water sources, staying on marked trails, and keeping group size small. When closely observed, the Leave No Trace ethos ensures that wilderness areas remain untainted by human interaction. In general, the law prohibits logging, mining, motorized or mechanized vehicles (including bicycles), road-building, and other forms of development in wilderness areas, though pre-existing mining claims and grazing ranges are permitted through grandfather clauses in the Wilderness Act. Wilderness areas fall into IUCN protected area management category Ia (strict nature preserves) or Ib (wilderness areas).

A special exemption to the rule against mechanized equipment is made for wilderness areas in Alaska: limited use of motorized vehicles and construction of cabins and aquaculture are permitted. These exemptions were allowed due to the large amount of wilderness in Alaska and the concerns of subsistence users, including Alaska Natives.

Wilderness areas are parts of national parks, wildlife refuges, national forests, and BLM lands; some units are managed by different agencies. Initially, the NWPS included 34 areas protecting 9.1 million acres (37,000 km^{2}) in the national forests. As of 2023, there are 806 areas in the NWPS, preserving 111,889,002 acres (45,279,873 ha). This is approximately 4.5% of the entire United States, though only about 2.7% of the 48 contiguous states. However, most of that acreage is located in a handful of states. The states with the highest number of wildernesses are California, Arizona, Nevada, Alaska, and Oregon. However, when measured in acres the list changes dramatically, as Alaska contains many of the largest areas protected under the act. In terms of total acres, Alaska, California, Arizona, Idaho, and Washington are the top five states for wilderness, containing almost 80 percent of the acreage in the system. Wilderness totals in most eastern states are modest, with the exceptions of Florida and Minnesota. Wilderness areas exist in every state except Connecticut, Delaware, Iowa, Kansas, Maryland, and Rhode Island.

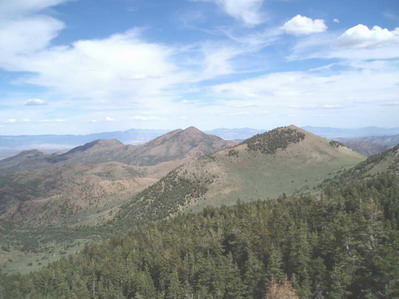
Red Mountain Wilderness, Nevada

Most U.S. wilderness areas are in national forests, but the largest amount of wilderness land is administered by the National Park Service. The largest contiguous wilderness complex in the United States is the Noatak and Gates of the Arctic Wildernesses in Alaska at 12,743,329 acres (5,157,042 ha). The largest wilderness area outside Alaska is the Death Valley Wilderness in southeastern California. The smallest area protected by the WPS is the Pelican Island Wilderness in northern Florida, which measures just 6 acres (2.4 ha) total. The smallest area preserved in the system was formerly the Rocks and Islands Wilderness in Northern California at 5 acres (2.0 ha), but after a reassessment by the Bureau of Land Management in 2006 it was officially expanded to 19 acres (7.7 ha).

== International efforts ==
On November 7, 2009, an agreement between the United States, Canada, and Mexico entitled the "Memorandum of Understanding on Cooperation for Wilderness Conservation" was made. This agreement created a new entity, the North American Intergovernmental Committee on Cooperation for Wilderness and Protected Areas Conservation, that would streamline the process for open communication between international agencies for the purpose of wilderness preservation. This committee was formed to gain insight on the benefits of wilderness preservation, establish open channels of communication between international agencies, and examine the cultural differences and similarities behind preservation efforts in each country. Within the U.S. system, all of the agencies responsible for wilderness preservation will work in cooperation with their international counterparts to determine the future of both the U.S. system and North American preservation efforts as a whole.

== Wildlife preservation ==
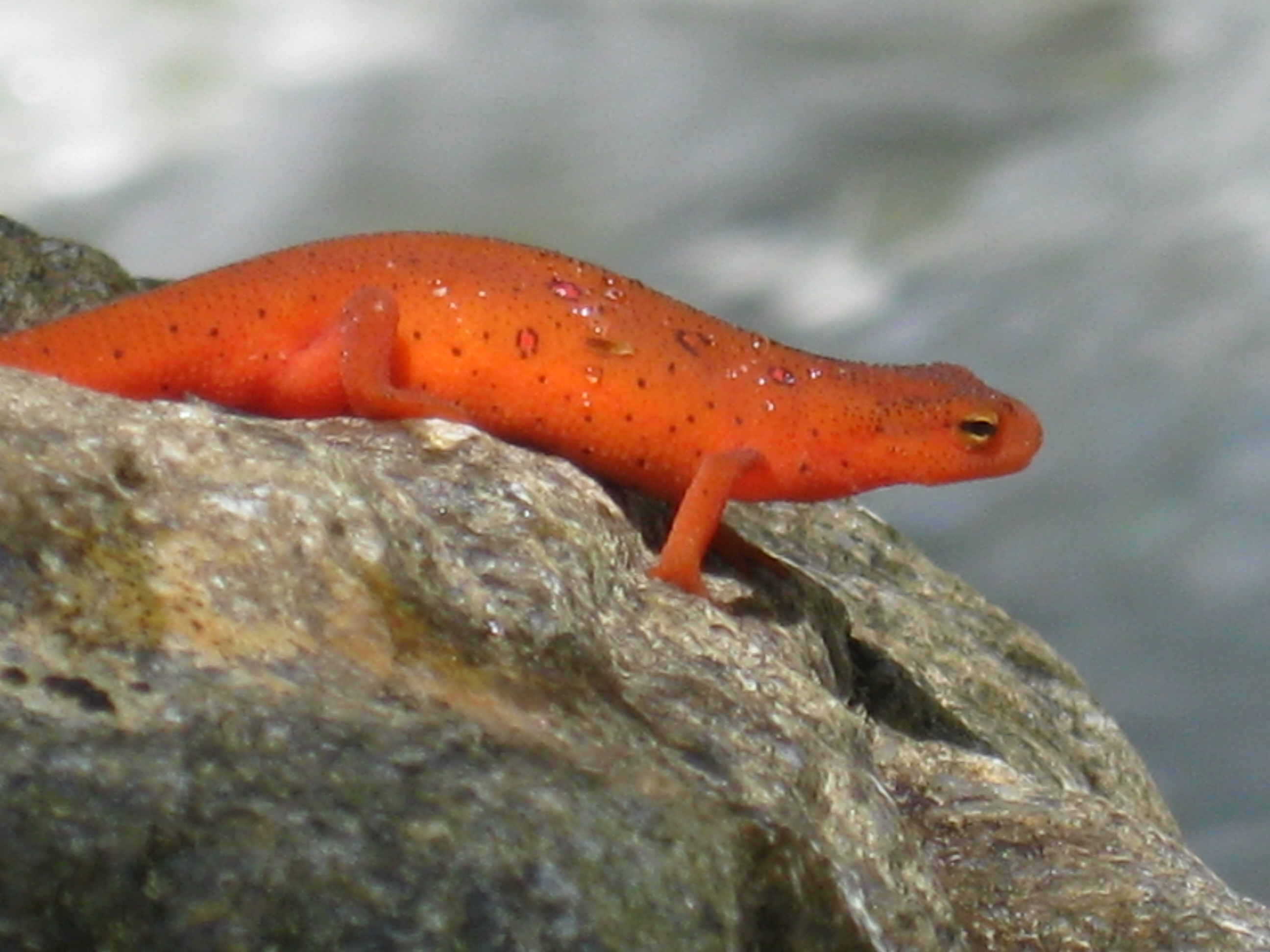
Amphibians, like this newt in the Cohutta Wilderness of North Georgia, are among the many types of fauna protected by the NWPS.

One of the major goals of the Wilderness Preservation System is to provide undeveloped habitats for threatened or endangered species. Many of the species found in the United States are represented in wilderness areas. There are 261 basic ecosystems in the U.S., and 157 of them are represented in the system. With 60% of all ecosystems somewhat protected by the NWPS, much of the wildlife in the U.S. also has an area in which to exist without significant human interaction.

In late 2011, a full wilderness review was requested of the Arctic Refuge Coastal Plain in Alaska. One of the major qualifications for this area to be considered as a possible wilderness area was its diverse wildlife population, many of which are on the endangered species list. In this potential wilderness area alone, whales, seals, wolves, polar bears, grizzly bears, muskoxen, caribou, and over 200 species of migratory birds call this one area home for at least part of the year. This vast assortment of flora and fauna is a major consideration for addition into the wilderness preservation system.

== Laws and policies ==
Thousands of laws and policies have helped shape and manage the National Wilderness Preservation System in the United States. The following Acts of Congress either directly affect the wilderness system or help influence wilderness management:

- General Mining Act of 1872: This Act declares public lands free and open for mineral exploration and occupancy. Procedures for mining claims and operations are established in this act as well as management of wilderness areas that contain minerals and other natural resources.
- Antiquities Act of 1906, National Historic Preservation Act of 1966, and the Archaeological Resources Protection Act of 1979: These Acts help protect and manage heritage resources on federal lands. They also aid in conserving valuable public and natural areas in order to protect objects of historic and scientific interest.
- National Park Service Organic Act: This Act was established in 1916 by the National Park Service and was enacted to conserve the scenery, wildlife, and both natural and historic objects for the enjoyment of the American Public.
- Wilderness Act: This Act, which was passed in 1964, classified and protected 54 wilderness areas (about 9.1 million acres) and established a system of adding new lands to the National Wilderness Preservation System. It also allowed jurisdiction over these wilderness areas by the Forest Service, National Park Service, or Fish and Wildlife Service. The Act also set up prohibitions on motorized and mechanized vehicles, timber harvest, and other means of development in these areas.
- National Environmental Policy Act (1970, 1975, 1982): This Act required federal agencies to consider and evaluate the environmental impacts of proposed actions. It also requires agencies to identify environmental impacts that are unavoidable and to evaluate all resources in the area before committing to a proposed action. This Act directs federal agencies to prepare and submit Environmental Impact Statements before development on public lands.
- Clean Air Act (1963, 1966, 1973, 1977, 1990): This Act established human health and welfare standards. It established Class I areas to be wilderness land greater than 5,000 acres (2,000 ha) and national parks that are greater than 6,000 acres (2,400 ha) that existed in 1977. This designation gives these areas special protection from the degradation of air quality by human-caused air pollution. This Act also requires states to develop and implement plans to reduce haze to natural levels by 2064 and calls for extensive monitoring of air quality related values (visibility, flora, fauna, soil, and water) across the nation.
- Clean Water Act (1948, 1972, 1977, 1987): This Act aims at protecting healthy waters and restoring unhealthy ones. It establishes the structure of regulating pollutants that are discharged into water and for regulating quality standards of waters in the United States. It set up pollution control standards and made it illegal to dump pollutants into waters around the U.S. without a permit.
- Endangered Species Act (1973, 1978, 1982)" This Act establishes a program to protect plants and animals that are being threatened with extinction. The Act recognizes certain plants and animals and establishes specific procedures for adding a species to the endangered list under a protective status. It also sets up programs with states across the U.S. as well as civil penalties for violation of this Act.
- Alaska National Interest Lands Conservation Act (1980): This Act specifically provided for the designation and conservation of public lands in Alaska. This added about 27 million acres (110,000 km^{2}) to the National Wilderness Preservation System along with several wild and scenic rivers. With this Act, Congress hoped to preserve the unaltered arctic areas as well as the tundra, boreal forests, and coastal rain forest ecosystems. It also helped to protect wildlife habitats for species who were dependent upon large undeveloped areas of land.

== Managing agencies ==
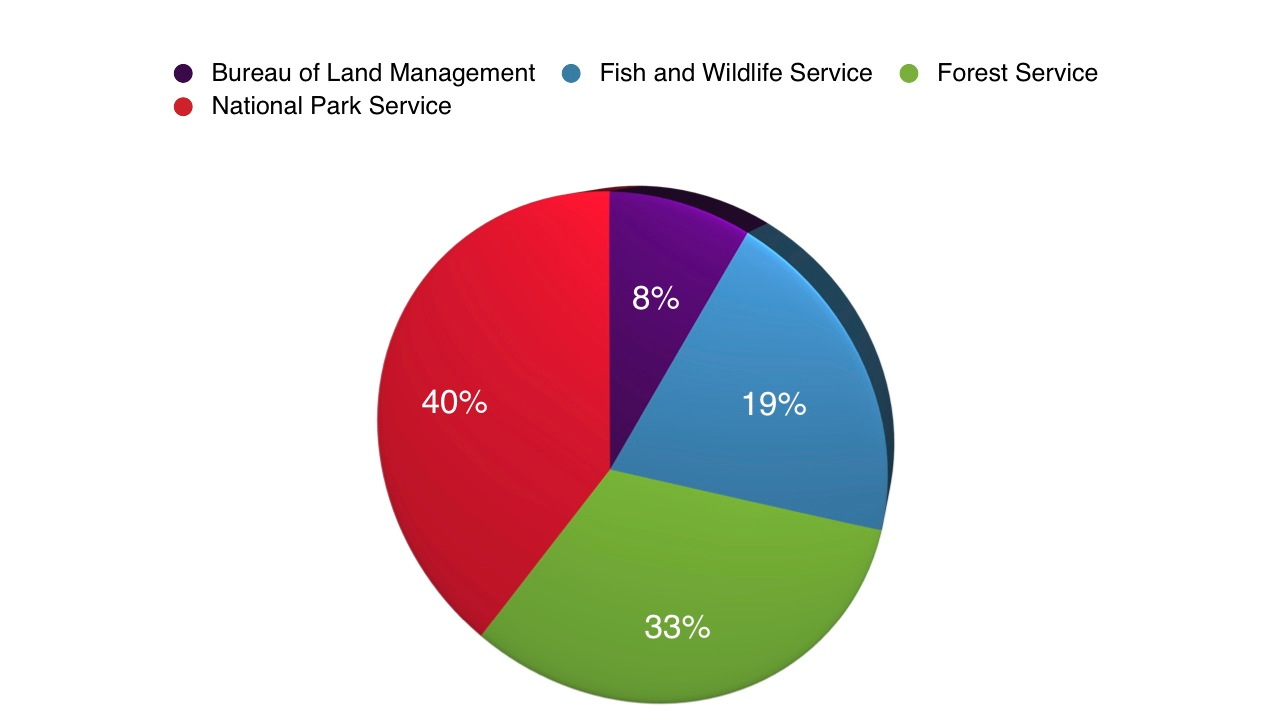
Share of area managed by each agency as of 2012

- National Park Service

Established in 1916, this agency helps protect more than 400 national park units. They also aid local tribes and governments, as well as non-profit organizations and businesses, by preserving local history and revitalizing communities.

- U.S. Forest Service

Established in 1905, this agency manages public lands in national forests or grasslands, which encompasses about 193 million acres (780,000 km^{2}) of land.

- U.S. Fish and Wildlife Service

Established in 1940, this agency manages 150 million acres (610,000 km^{2}) of the National Wildlife Refuge System, as well as thousands of small wetlands and other special land areas. Some of their contributions include protecting and conserving endangered species and their wildlife habitats and enforcing federal wildlife laws.

- Bureau of Land Management

Established in 1812 as the General Land Office and later combined with the Grazing Service to become the Bureau of Land Management in 1946, this agency manages 247 million acres of public land. This agency's National Landscape Conservation System (NLCS) includes over 886 federally recognized areas and more than 27 million acres (110,000 km^{2}) of land in the U.S. They aim to protect wilderness areas, as well as wild and scenic rivers, national monuments, and historic trails. It safeguards cultural sites and many Indian preserves of the western states. The mission of the NLCS is to "conserve, protect, and restore these nationally significant landscapes that are recognized for their outstanding cultural, ecological, and scientific values".

The National Wilderness Preservation System: Area Administered by each Federal Agency (September 2014)
Agency	Wilderness area	Agency land designated wilderness
National Park Service	43,932,843 acres (17,778,991 ha)	56%
U.S. Forest Service	36,165,620 acres (14,635,710 ha)	18%
U.S. Fish and Wildlife Service	20,702,488 acres (8,378,000 ha)	22%
Bureau of Land Management	8,710,087 acres (3,524,847 ha)	2%
Total	109,511,038 acres (44,317,545 ha)	

== State-level counterparts ==
Some state and tribal governments also designate wilderness areas under their own authority and local laws. These are not federal areas, and the exact nature of protection may differ from federal laws. Some U.S. states have created wilderness preservation programs modeled on the NWPS.

- Maryland Wildlands Preservation System
- California Wilderness Preservation System

== See also ==
- Conservation movement
- IUCN protected area categories
- List of wilderness areas of the United States
- Bob Marshall (wilderness activist)
- Natural environment
- Wilderness study area
- Howard Zahniser
