= Bennett Springs, Nevada =

- Census-designated place
- Location within Nevada Location within the United States
- Coordinates: 37°42′51″N 114°28′00″W
- Country: United States
- State: Nevada
- County: Lincoln

Area
  - Total: 3.39 sq mi (8.77 km^{2})
  - Land: 3.39 sq mi (8.77 km^{2})
  - Water: 0 sq mi (0.00 km^{2})
- Elevation: 4,708 ft (1,435 m)

Population (2020)
  - Total: 158
  - Density: 46.7/sq mi (18.02/km^{2})
- Time zone: UTC-8 (Pacific (PST))
  - Summer (DST): UTC-7 (PDT)
- ZIP code: 89008
- Area code: 775
- FIPS code: 32-05275
- GNIS feature ID: 2583912

Bennett Springs is a census-designated place in Lincoln County, Nevada, United States. As of the 2020 census, Bennett Springs had a population of 158.

== Geography ==
Bennett Springs is located on the western slopes of the Meadow Valley, west of U.S. Route 93, 7 miles (11 km) south of Panaca and 8 miles (13 km) north of Caliente.

According to the U.S. Census Bureau, the Bennett Springs CDP has an area of 3.6 square miles (9.3 km^{2}), all of it land.

== Demographics ==
Historical population
Census	Pop.	Note	%±
2020	158		—
U.S. Decennial Census
