= Wilson Creek Range =

Mountain range in Lincoln County, Nevada, United States

- Location within Nevada

Highest point
- Elevation: 2,250 m (7,380 ft)

Geography
- Country: United States
- State: Nevada
- District: Lincoln County
- Range coordinates: 38°11′20.855″N 114°20′48.958″W
- Topo map: USGS Parsnip Peak

The Wilson Creek Range is a mountain range in Lincoln County, Nevada, United States.

== Description ==
The range has the name of Charles Wilson, a local county commissioner.

== See also ==
- List of mountain ranges of Nevada
