= High Schells Wilderness =

Protected area in Nevada, United States

- IUCN category Ib (wilderness area)
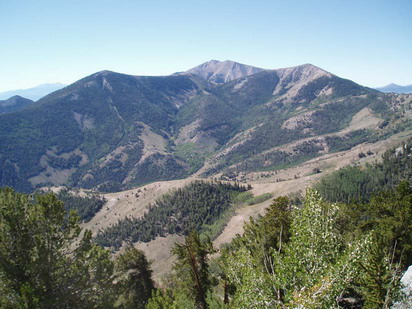

- Location within Nevada Location within the United States
- Location: White Pine County, Nevada United States
- Nearest city: Ely, Nevada
- Coordinates: 39.3399041581°N 114.599215912°W
- Area: 121,497 acres (49,168 ha)
- Established: December 20, 2006
- Governing body: U.S. Forest Service

The High Schells Wilderness is a 121,497-acre (49,168 ha) wilderness area in the Schell Creek Range of White Pine County, in the U.S. state of Nevada. The Wilderness lies within the Humboldt-Toiyabe National Forest and is therefore administered by the U.S. Forest Service.

== Flora and fauna ==
The High Schells Wilderness is home to an abundance of elk, mule deer, and mountain lion, which thrive in forests of quaking aspen, Douglas and white fir, Engelmann spruce, and limber and bristlecone pine. Golden eagles can be seen soaring the updrafts along the crest of the Schell Creek Range. Riparian vegetation provides key habitat for blue grouse, sage grouse, chukar and many other species. Perennial streams throughout the area support populations of rainbow, brook, cutthroat and brown trout.

== Archeology ==
Archeological sites in the High Schells Wilderness include petroglyphs and lithic scatters.

== See also ==
- Nevada Wilderness Areas
- List of wilderness areas in Nevada
- List of U.S. Wilderness Areas
- Wilderness Act
