= Cave Valley (Nevada) =

Valley in Nevada, United States

Coordinates: 36°36′49″N 114°40′51″W

Cave Valley is a valley in the U.S. state of Nevada.

Cave Valley was so named for the caves the valley contains.
