= Lincoln County, Nevada =

County in Nevada, United States

- County
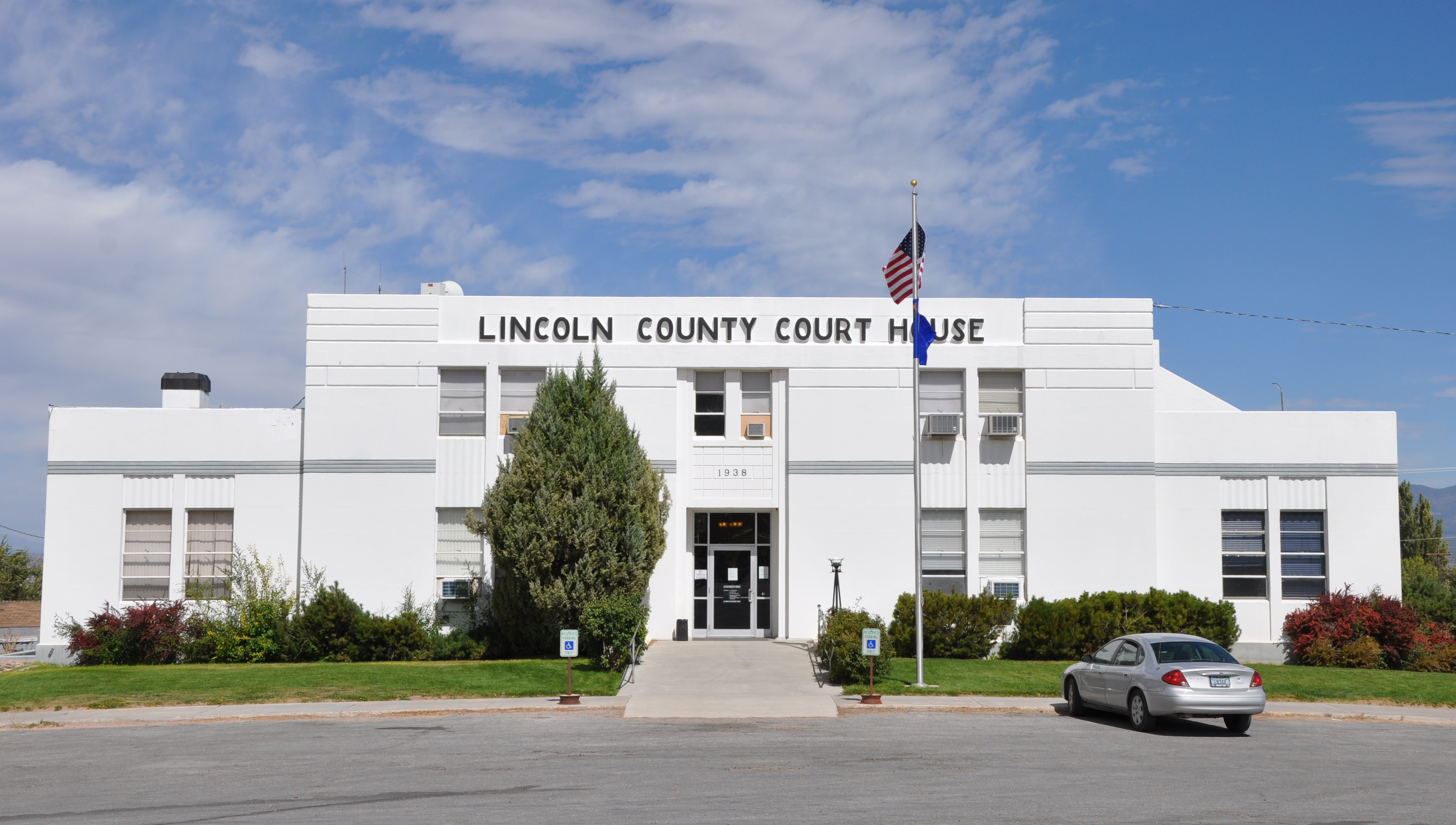
- Lincoln County Courthouse in Pioche

- Flag Seal

- Location within the U.S. state of Nevada
- Coordinates: 37°38′N 114°53′W
- Country: United States
- State: Nevada
- Founded: 1866; 160 years ago
- Named for: Abraham Lincoln
- Seat: Pioche
- Largest city: Caliente

Area
  - Total: 10,637 sq mi (27,550 km^{2})
  - Land: 10,633 sq mi (27,540 km^{2})
  - Water: 3.8 sq mi (9.8 km^{2}) 0.04%

Population (2020)
  - Total: 4,499
  - Estimate (2025): 4,320 ▼
  - Density: 0.4231/sq mi (0.1634/km^{2})
- Time zone: UTC−8 (Pacific)
  - Summer (DST): UTC−7 (PDT)
- Congressional district: 4th
- Website: lincolncountynv.org

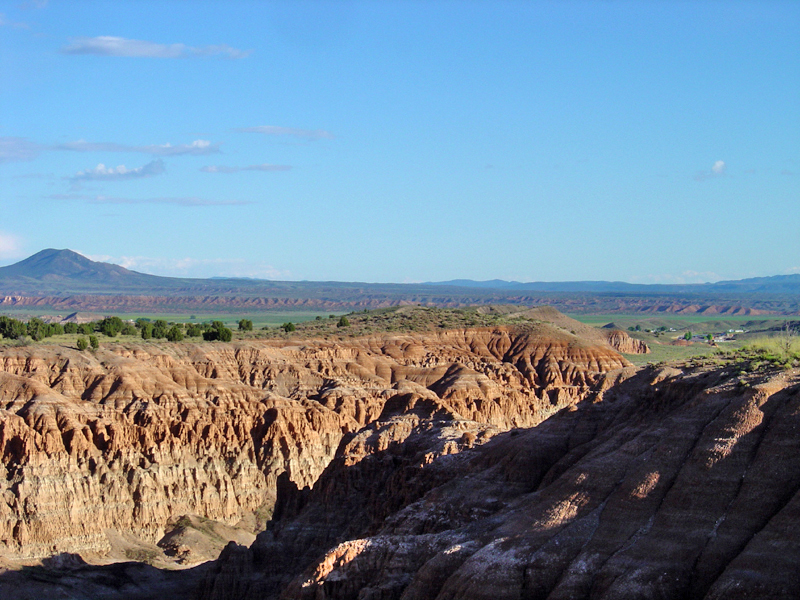
Cathedral Gorge and Lincoln County near Panaca

Lincoln County is a county in the U.S. state of Nevada. As of the 2020 census, the population was 4,499, making it the fourth-least populous county in Nevada. Its county seat is Pioche. The county notably home to Area 51, a highly-classified United States Air Force installation which also includes Groom Lake.

== History ==
Lincoln County was established in 1866 after Congress enlarged Nevada by moving its state line eastward and southward at the expense of Utah and Arizona territories. It was named after Abraham Lincoln, the 16th president of the United States. Original legislation called for the creation of a "Stewart County", after Nevada Senator William M. Stewart, but this was later changed in a substitute bill. Crystal Springs was the county's first seat in 1866, followed by Hiko in 1867 and Pioche in 1871.

In 1870, the county's newspaper, Lincoln County Record, was established. Lincoln County initially included a ranch village and railroad siding named Las Vegas. However, that siding, which led to the future city of Las Vegas, was separated from Lincoln County upon the founding of Clark County effective July 1, 1909, by act of the Nevada Legislature.

Area 51 is in Lincoln County and the county sheriff acts in proxy for the perimeter security forces.

== Geography ==
According to the U.S. Census Bureau, the county has an area of 10,637 square miles (27,550 km^{2}), of which 10,633 square miles (27,540 km^{2}) is land and 3.8 square miles (9.8 km^{2}) (0.04%) is water. While only the third-largest county by area in the state of Nevada, it is the seventh-largest county in area in the United States, not including boroughs and census areas in Alaska. The south cliff of Mount Rummel, the summit of which is just north of the county line in White Pine County, contains Lincoln County's highest point, at 10,640 feet (3,240 m). The highest independent mountain completely within Lincoln County is Shingle Peak, while the county's most topographically prominent peak is Mormon Peak.

=== Major highways ===
- U.S. Route 93
- State Route 317
- State Route 318
- State Route 319
- State Route 320
- State Route 321
- State Route 322
- State Route 375
- State Route 816

=== Adjacent counties ===
- White Pine County - north
- Millard County, Utah - northeast/Mountain Time Border
- Beaver County, Utah - east/Mountain Time Border
- Iron County, Utah - east/Mountain Time Border
- Washington County, Utah - east/Mountain Time Border
- Mohave County, Arizona - southeast/Mountain Time Border
- Clark County, Nevada - south
- Nye County, Nevada - west

Lower Pahranagat Lake in the Pahranagat National Wildlife Refuge

=== National protected areas ===
- Desert National Wildlife Refuge (part)
- Humboldt National Forest (part)
- Pahranagat National Wildlife Refuge

==== National wilderness areas ====
Lincoln County contains 16 official wilderness areas that are part of the National Wilderness Preservation System. All are managed by the Bureau of Land Management. Several extend into neighboring counties (as indicated below).

- Big Rocks Wilderness
- Clover Mountains Wilderness
- Delamar Mountains Wilderness
- Far South Egans Wilderness (partly in Nye County)
- Fortification Range Wilderness
- Meadow Valley Range Wilderness (partly in Clark County)
- Mormon Mountains Wilderness (partly in Clark County)
- Mount Grafton Wilderness (mostly in White Pine County)
- Mount Irish Wilderness
- Parsnip Peak Wilderness
- South Egan Range Wilderness (partly in White Pine and Nye Counties)
- South Pahroc Range Wilderness
- Tunnel Spring Wilderness
- Weepah Spring Wilderness (partly in Nye County)
- White Rock Range Wilderness
- Worthington Mountains Wilderness

== Demographics ==
=== Racial and ethnic composition ===
Lincoln County, Nevada— Racial and ethnic composition Note: the US Census treats Hispanic/Latino as an ethnic category. This table excludes Latinos from the racial categories and assigns them to a separate category. Hispanics/Latinos may be of any race.
Race / Ethnicity (NH = Non-Hispanic)	Pop 1980	Pop 1990	Pop 2000	Pop 2010	Pop 2020	% 1980	% 1990	% 2000	% 2010	% 2020
White alone (NH)	3,354	3,463	3,709	4,698	3,838	89.87%	91.74%	89.05%	87.90%	85.31%
Black or African American alone (NH)	13	79	71	120	168	0.35%	2.09%	1.70%	2.25%	3.73%
Native American or Alaska Native alone (NH)	65	58	66	57	26	1.74%	1.54%	1.58%	1.07%	0.58%
Asian alone (NH)	19	16	13	38	21	0.51%	0.42%	0.31%	0.71%	0.47%
Native Hawaiian or Pacific Islander alone (NH)	x	x	1	14	13	x	x	0.02%	0.26%	0.29%
Other race alone (NH)	0	3	23	0	9	0.00%	0.08%	0.55%	0.00%	0.20%
Mixed race or Multiracial (NH)	x	x	61	86	130	x	x	1.46%	1.61%	2.89%
Hispanic or Latino (any race)	281	156	221	332	294	7.53%	4.13%	5.31%	6.21%	6.53%
Total	3,732	3,775	4,165	5,345	4,499	100.00%	100.00%	100.00%	100.00%	100.00%

=== 2020 census ===
Historical population
Census	Pop.	Note	%±
1870	2,985		—
1880	2,637		−11.7%
1890	2,466		−6.5%
1900	3,284		33.2%
1910	3,489		6.2%
1920	2,287		−34.5%
1930	3,601		57.5%
1940	4,130		14.7%
1950	3,837		−7.1%
1960	2,431		−36.6%
1970	2,557		5.2%
1980	3,732		46.0%
1990	3,775		1.2%
2000	4,165		10.3%
2010	5,345		28.3%
2020	4,499		−15.8%
2025 (est.)	4,320	▼	−4.0%
U.S. Decennial Census; 1790-1960 1900-1990; 1990-2000 2010-2020

As of the 2020 census, the county had a population of 4,499. The median age was 43.0 years; 24.1% of residents were under the age of 18 and 23.7% of residents were 65 years of age or older. For every 100 females there were 115.5 males, and for every 100 females age 18 and over there were 116.5 males.

0.0% of residents lived in urban areas, while 100.0% lived in rural areas.

The racial makeup of the county was 87.8% White, 3.8% Black or African American, 0.6% American Indian and Alaska Native, 0.5% Asian, 0.5% Native Hawaiian and Pacific Islander, 2.4% from some other race, and 4.4% from two or more races. Hispanic or Latino residents of any race comprised 6.5% of the population.

There were 1,719 households in the county, of which 27.5% had children under the age of 18 living with them and 22.0% had a female householder with no spouse or partner present. About 31.2% of all households were made up of individuals and 15.9% had someone living alone who was 65 years of age or older.

There were 2,203 housing units, of which 22.0% were vacant. Among occupied housing units, 73.1% were owner-occupied and 26.9% were renter-occupied. The homeowner vacancy rate was 3.3% and the rental vacancy rate was 4.5%.

=== 2010 census ===
As of the 2010 United States census, there were 5,345 people, 1,988 households, and 1,282 families living in the county. The population density was 0.5 inhabitants per square mile (0.19/km^{2}). There were 2,730 housing units at an average density of 0.3 per square mile (0.12/km^{2}). The racial makeup of the county was 91.1% white, 2.3% black or African American, 1.1% American Indian, 0.7% Asian, 0.3% Pacific islander, 2.2% from other races, and 2.3% from two or more races. Those of Hispanic or Latino origin made up 6.2% of the population. In terms of ancestry, 39.8% were English, 19.5% were German, 12.4% were Irish, 6.1% were Danish, 5.9% were Dutch, and 1.8% were American.

Of the 1,988 households, 28.9% had children under the age of 18 living with them, 53.0% were married couples living together, 7.7% had a female householder with no husband present, 35.5% were non-families, and 30.4% of all households were made up of individuals. The average household size was 2.57 and the average family size was 3.16. The median age was 39.9 years.

The median income for a household in the county was $44,695 and the median income for a family was $56,167. Males had a median income of $51,475 versus $26,366 for females. The per capita income for the county was $18,148. About 7.5% of families and 10.6% of the population were below the poverty line, including 12.5% of those under age 18 and 9.6% of those age 65 or over.

=== 2000 census ===
As of the census of 2000, there were 4,165 people, 1,540 households, and 1,010 families living in the county. The population density was less than one person per square mile (and less than 1/km^{2}). There were 2,178 housing units at an average density of 0 per square mile (0/km^{2}). The racial makeup of the county was 91.50% White, 1.78% Black or African American, 1.75% Native American, 0.34% Asian, 0.02% Pacific Islander, 2.69% from other races, and 1.92% from two or more races. 5.31% of the population were Hispanic or Latino of any race.

According to the 2000 census the five largest ancestry groups in Lincoln County are English (21%), German (18%), Irish (11%), Mexican (4%) and Italian (4%).

There were 1,540 households, out of which 29.00% had children under the age of 18 living with them, 56.20% were married couples living together, 7.90% had a female householder with no husband present, and 34.40% were non-families. 31.30% of all households were made up of individuals, and 16.10% had someone living alone who was 65 years of age or older. The average household size was 2.48 and the average family size was 3.15.

In the county, the population was spread out, with 30.10% under the age of 18, 6.00% from 18 to 24, 21.90% from 25 to 44, 25.90% from 45 to 64, and 16.20% who were 65 years of age or older. The median age was 39 years. For every 100 females there were 107.90 males. For every 100 females age 18 and over, there were 108.20 males.

The median income for a household in the county was $31,979, and the median income for a family was $45,588. Males had a median income of $40,048 versus $23,571 for females. The per capita income for the county was $17,326. About 11.50% of families and 16.50% of the population were below the poverty line, including 19.60% of those under age 18 and 17.40% of those age 65 or over.

== Education ==
Public schools in are under the Lincoln County School District. The schools are:

- Pioche Elementary School
- Caliente Elementary School
- Pahranagat Valley Elementary School
- Panaca Elementary School
- Meadow Valley Middle School
- Pahranagat Valley Middle School
- Lincoln County High School
- C. O. Bastian High School
- Pahranagat Valley High School

== Politics ==
United States presidential election results for Lincoln County, Nevada
Year	Republican		Democratic		Third party(ies)	
Year	No.	%	No.	%	No.	%
1904	405	53.08%	295	38.66%	63	8.26%
1908	690	42.72%	768	47.55%	157	9.72%
1912	100	18.28%	275	50.27%	172	31.44%
1916	202	22.67%	634	71.16%	55	6.17%
1920	373	47.64%	366	46.74%	44	5.62%
1924	200	27.10%	257	34.82%	281	38.08%
1928	553	50.50%	542	49.50%	0	0.00%
1932	295	21.07%	1,105	78.93%	0	0.00%
1936	254	13.42%	1,639	86.58%	0	0.00%
1940	461	22.36%	1,601	77.64%	0	0.00%
1944	524	28.81%	1,295	71.19%	0	0.00%
1948	520	33.48%	1,004	64.65%	29	1.87%
1952	903	48.97%	941	51.03%	0	0.00%
1956	885	52.43%	803	47.57%	0	0.00%
1960	530	40.74%	771	59.26%	0	0.00%
1964	440	35.92%	785	64.08%	0	0.00%
1968	555	49.87%	414	37.20%	144	12.94%
1972	841	68.77%	382	31.23%	0	0.00%
1976	700	50.04%	642	45.89%	57	4.07%
1980	1,087	68.54%	396	24.97%	103	6.49%
1984	1,175	72.71%	397	24.57%	44	2.72%
1988	1,035	66.18%	466	29.80%	63	4.03%
1992	890	47.93%	511	27.52%	456	24.56%
1996	936	52.50%	499	27.99%	348	19.52%
2000	1,372	70.14%	461	23.57%	123	6.29%
2004	1,579	77.14%	418	20.42%	50	2.44%
2008	1,498	71.10%	518	24.58%	91	4.32%
2012	1,691	78.58%	400	18.59%	61	2.83%
2016	1,671	78.38%	285	13.37%	176	8.26%
2020	2,067	84.51%	330	13.49%	49	2.00%
2024	2,108	85.28%	314	12.70%	50	2.02%

United States Senate election results for Lincoln County, Nevada1
Year	Republican		Democratic		Third party(ies)	
Year	No.	%	No.	%	No.	%
2024	1,959	79.83%	353	14.38%	142	5.79%

Before 1968, Lincoln County frequently backed the Democratic Party in presidential elections, with only five elections from 1904 to 1964 not won by a Democratic nominee. The 1968 election began the county's status as a Republican Party stronghold, with no Democrat managing to win 30% of its votes since Jimmy Carter in 1976. The county since then has generally continued further into the Republican party column, with Donald Trump's 2024 performance of over 85% being the best for any Republican yet. In this election the county was second only to Eureka County as the most Republican county in the state of Nevada.

== Communities ==
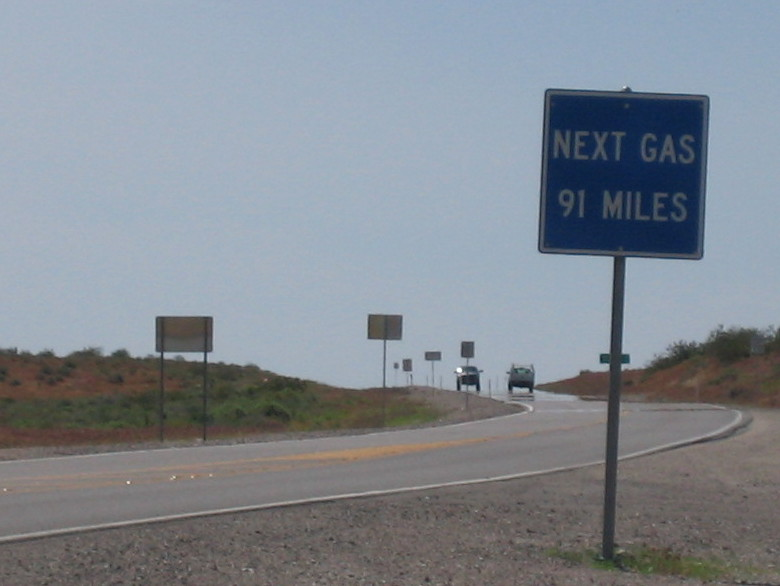
A sign on U.S. Route 93 in Lincoln County

=== City ===
- Caliente

=== Unincorporated towns ===
- Alamo
- Panaca
- Pioche

=== Census-designated places ===
- Beaverdam
- Bennett Springs
- Dry Valley
- Mount Wilson
- Rachel
- Ursine

=== Communities ===
- Ash Springs
- Barclay
- Caselton
- Hiko

=== Ghost towns ===
- Carp
- Crystal Springs
- Elgin
- Etna
- Fay

=== Planned development ===
- Coyote Springs — a proposed community for 240,000 people.

== Notable people ==
- Helen J. Stewart, at one time the largest landowner in the county
- Land artist Michael Heizer lives in Garden Valley near his last work, City.

== See also ==
- National Register of Historic Places listings in Lincoln County, Nevada
- Maynard Lake Fault
