= Selenite =

Selenite may refer to:

== Substances containing selenium ==
- A selenium-containing anion or ionic compound with the SeO_{3}^{2−} anion:
  - Selenite (ion), anion is a selenium oxoanion with the chemical formula SeO_{3}^{2−}
    - Selenous acid, the conjugate acid, with the formula H_{2}SeO_{3}
    - Salts of this anion:
      - Silver selenite, an inorganic compound of formula Ag_{2}SeO_{3}
      - Sodium selenite, a salt, a colourless solid, and the most common water-soluble selenium compound
- Selenite broth, an enrichment medium for the isolation of Salmonella species

== Other ==
- Selenite (gypsum), a variety of gypsum (CaSO_{4}·2H_{2}O)
- Selenites is a synonym of Zophos, a genus of land snails in the family Haplotrematidae
- Selenite Range, a mountain range in Pershing County, Nevada
  - Selenite Peak, a summit in the Selenite Range, Nevada
- Selenite, a high class citizen that experienced space travel, from the videogame Event_0
- Selenite, a fictional native inhabitant of the Moon; see Moon in science fiction#Life on the Moon
- Selenitic Age, a fictional place in the game Myst
