= Old Razorback Mountain =

Mountain in Nevada, United States

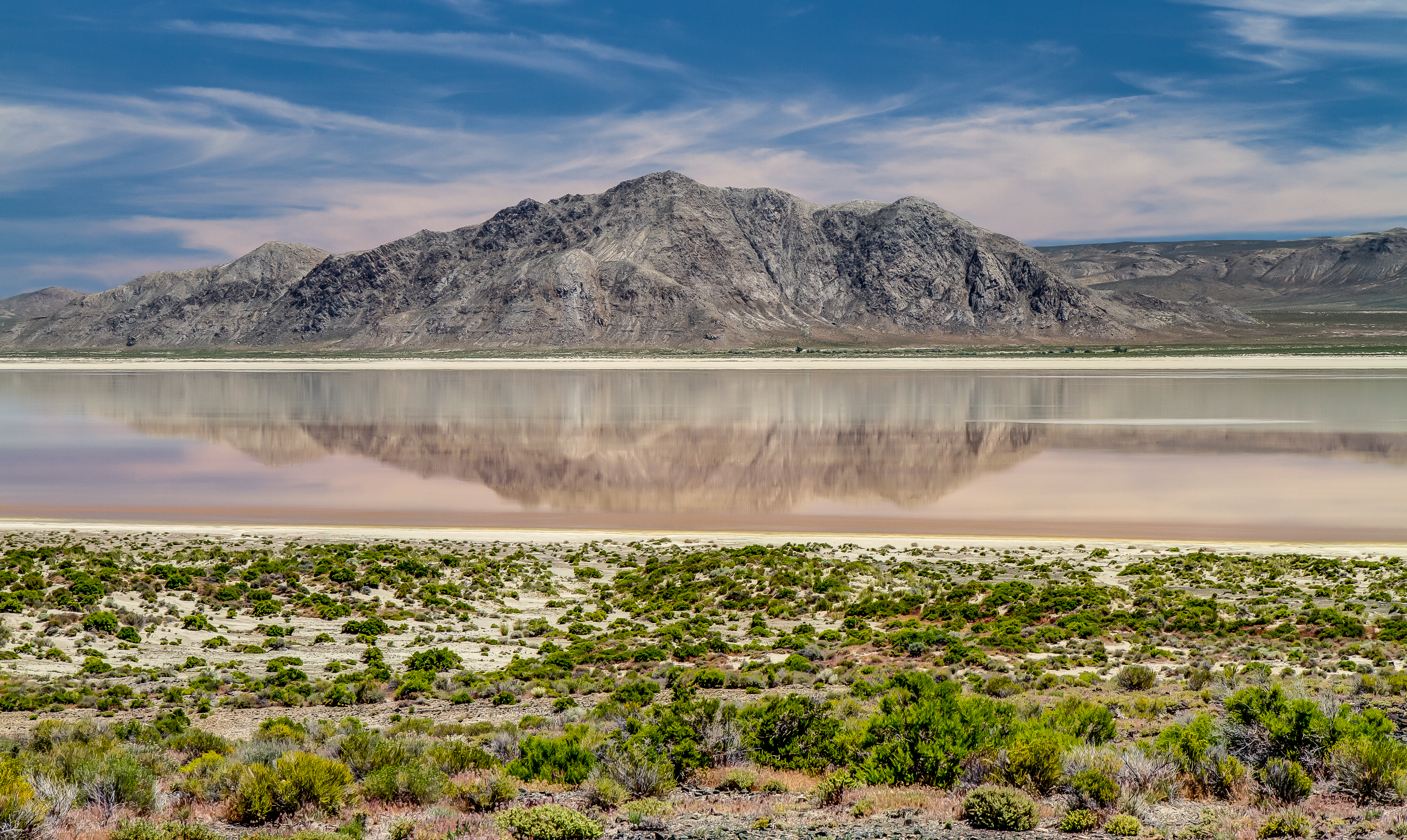
- Northwest aspect reflected in wet playa

Highest point
- Elevation: 5,650 ft (1,722 m)
- Prominence: 1,300 ft (396 m)
- Parent peak: Dry Mountain (6,526 ft)
- Isolation: 6.15 mi (9.90 km)
- Coordinates: 40°44′33″N 119°08′34″W

Geography
- Location within Nevada Location within the United States
- Location: Black Rock Desert
- Country: United States of America
- State: Nevada
- County: Pershing
- Parent range: Selenite Range; Great Basin Ranges
- Topo map: USGS Dry Mountain NW

Geology
- Mountain type: Fault block

Old Razorback Mountain is a 5,650-foot elevation (1,722 m) summit located in Pershing County, Nevada, United States.

== Description ==
Old Razorback Mountain is part of the Selenite Range which is a subset of the Great Basin Ranges. This peak is set on land managed by the Bureau of Land Management. It is situated 14 miles (23 km) northeast of the town of Gerlach, and five miles (8.0 km) southeast of Black Rock City where the Burning Man event is held each year. Trego Hot Springs is located at the foot of the mountain's north base. Topographic relief is significant as the summit rises over 1,700 feet (520 meters) above Black Rock playa in less than one mile and the east aspect rises 1,300 feet in 0.4 mile. This landform's toponym has been officially adopted by the U.S. Board on Geographic Names.

== Climate ==
Old Razorback Mountain is set in the Black Rock Desert which has hot summers and cold winters. The desert is an example of a cold desert climate as the desert's elevation makes temperatures cooler than lower elevation deserts. Due to the high elevation and aridity, temperatures drop sharply after sunset. Summer nights are comfortably cool. Winter highs are generally above freezing, and winter nights are bitterly cold, with temperatures often dropping well below freezing.

== Gallery ==
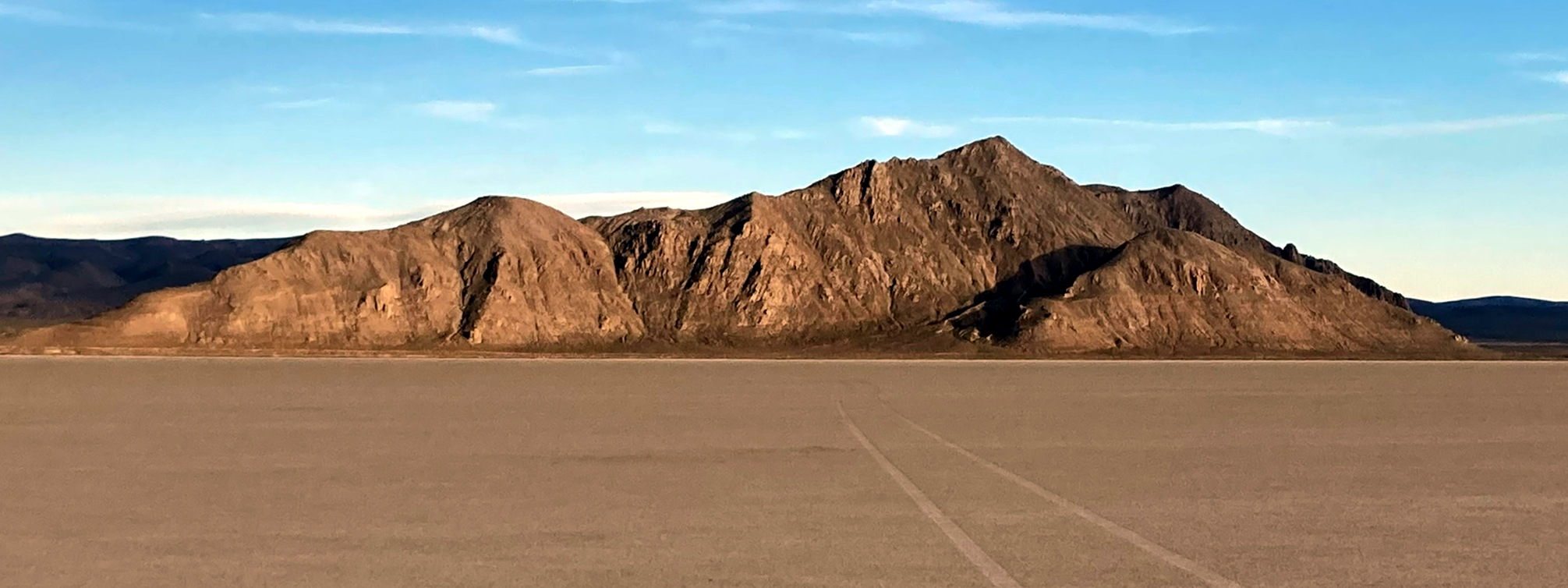
Northwest aspect

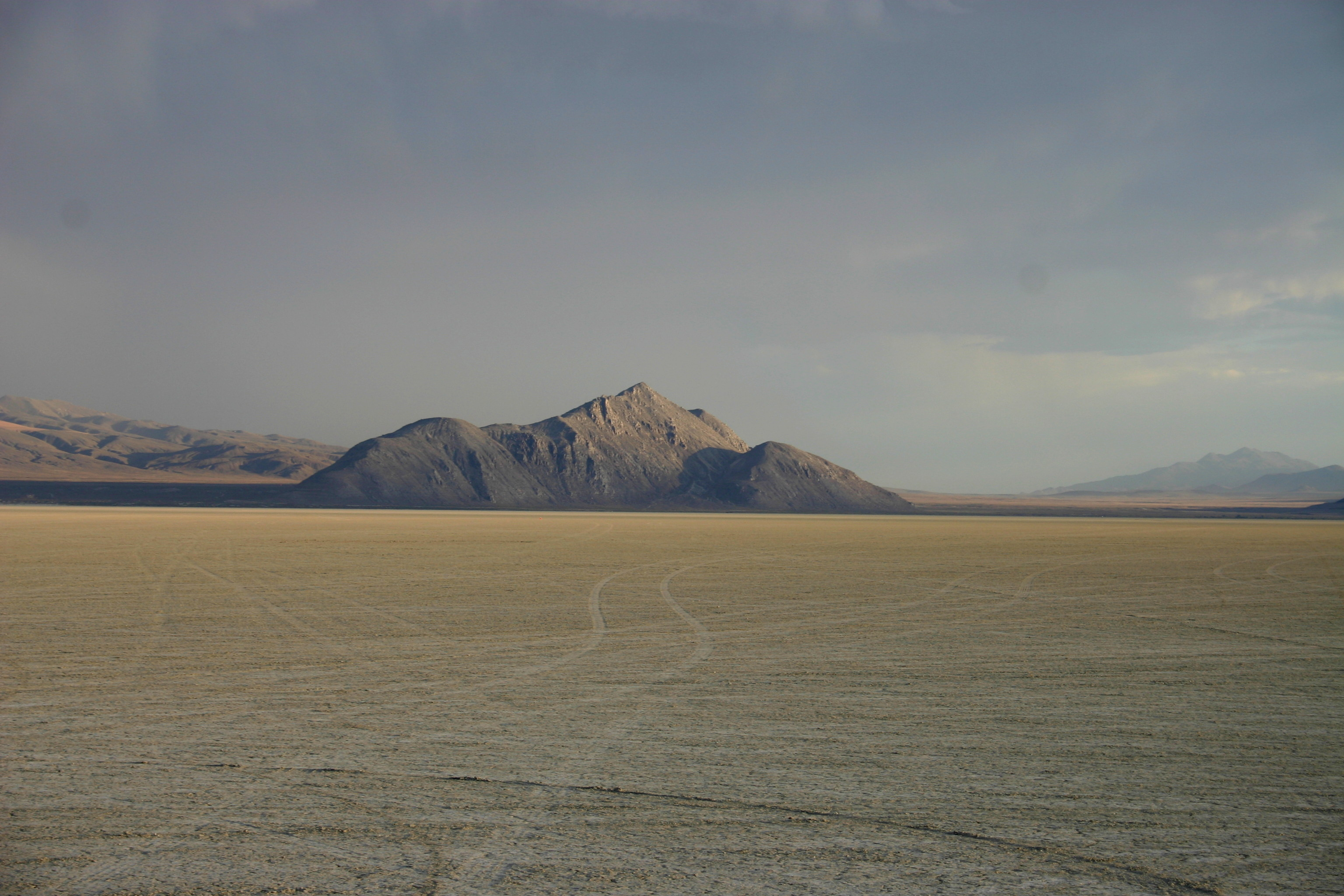
North aspect

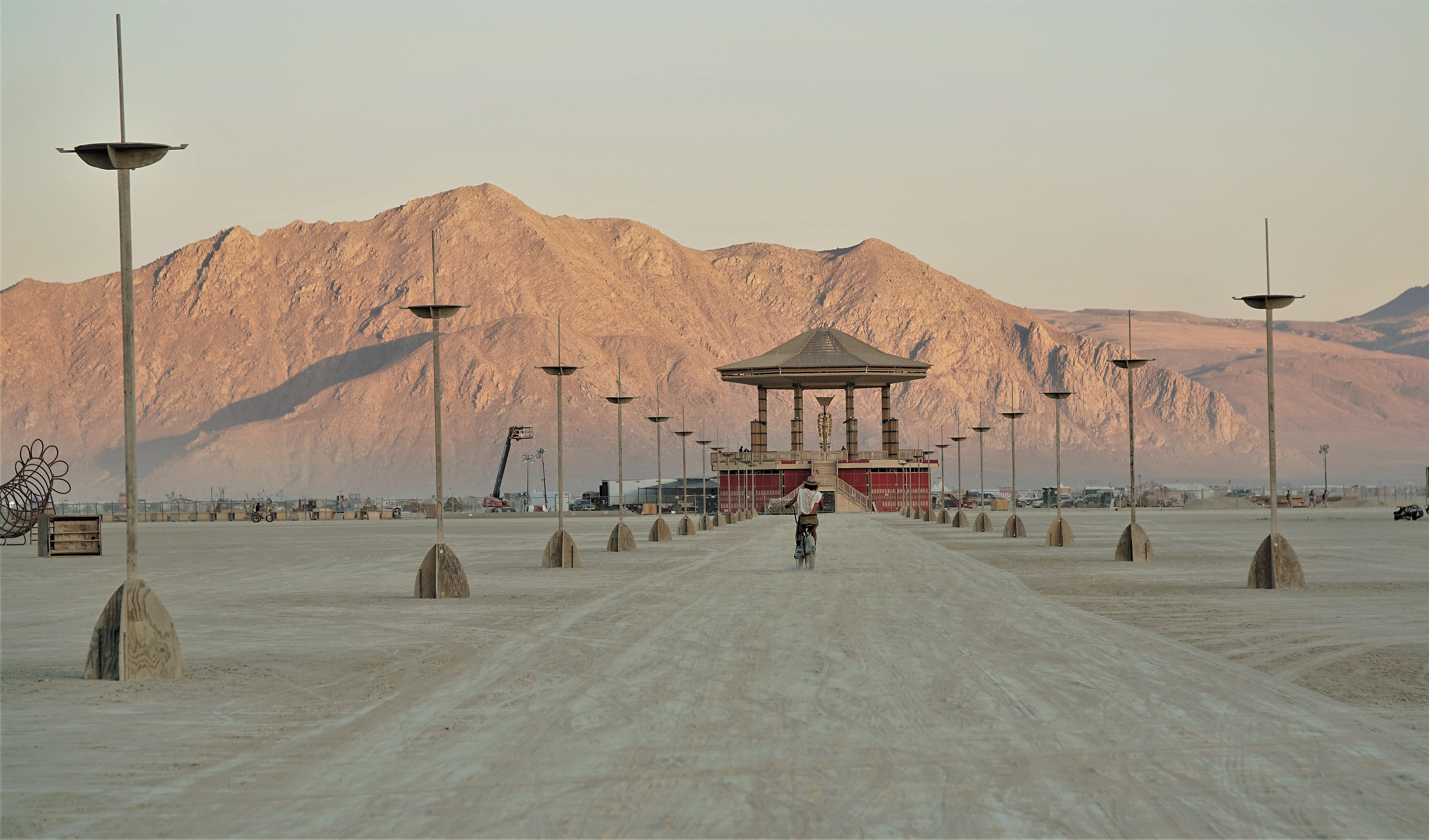
Old Razorback Mountain seen from Black Rock City

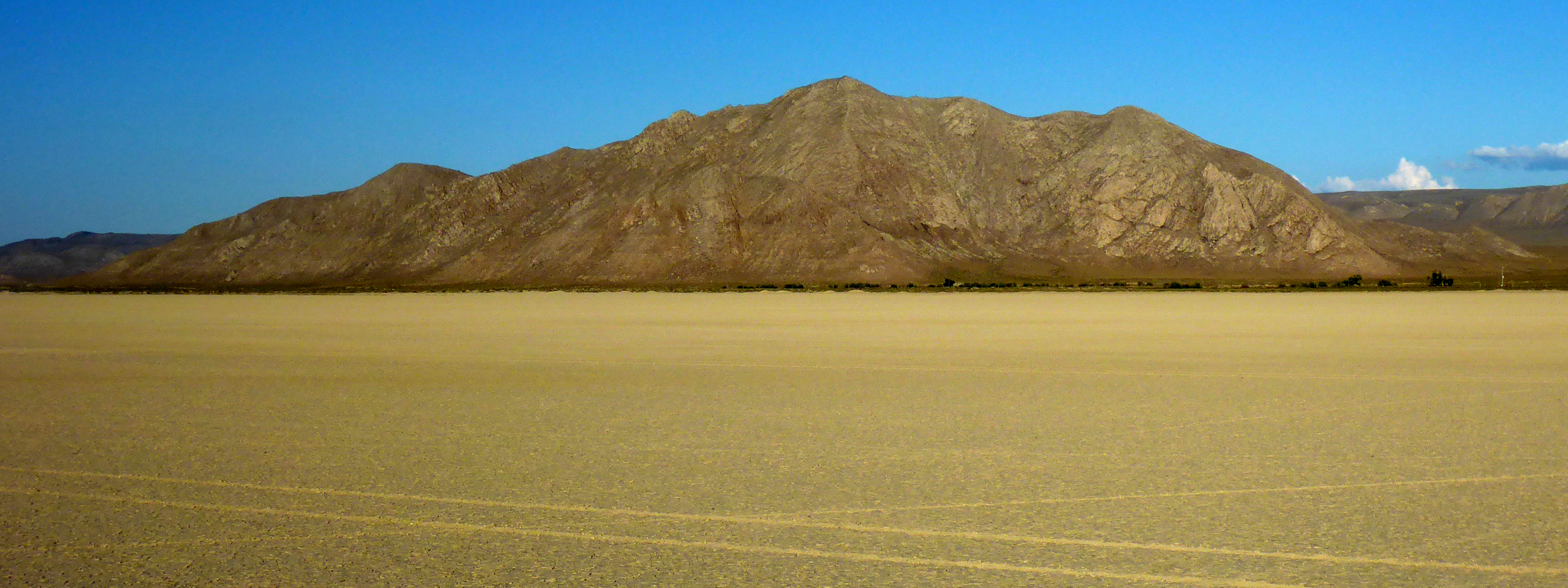
Old Razorback Mountain and playa

== See also ==
- Great Basin
