= Empire Airport =

Empire Airport may refer to:

- Empire Airport (Michigan) in Empire, Michigan, United States (FAA: Y87)
- Empire Airport (Nevada) in Empire, Nevada, United States (FAA: 1A8)
