= Kumiva Peak =

Mountain in Nevada, United States

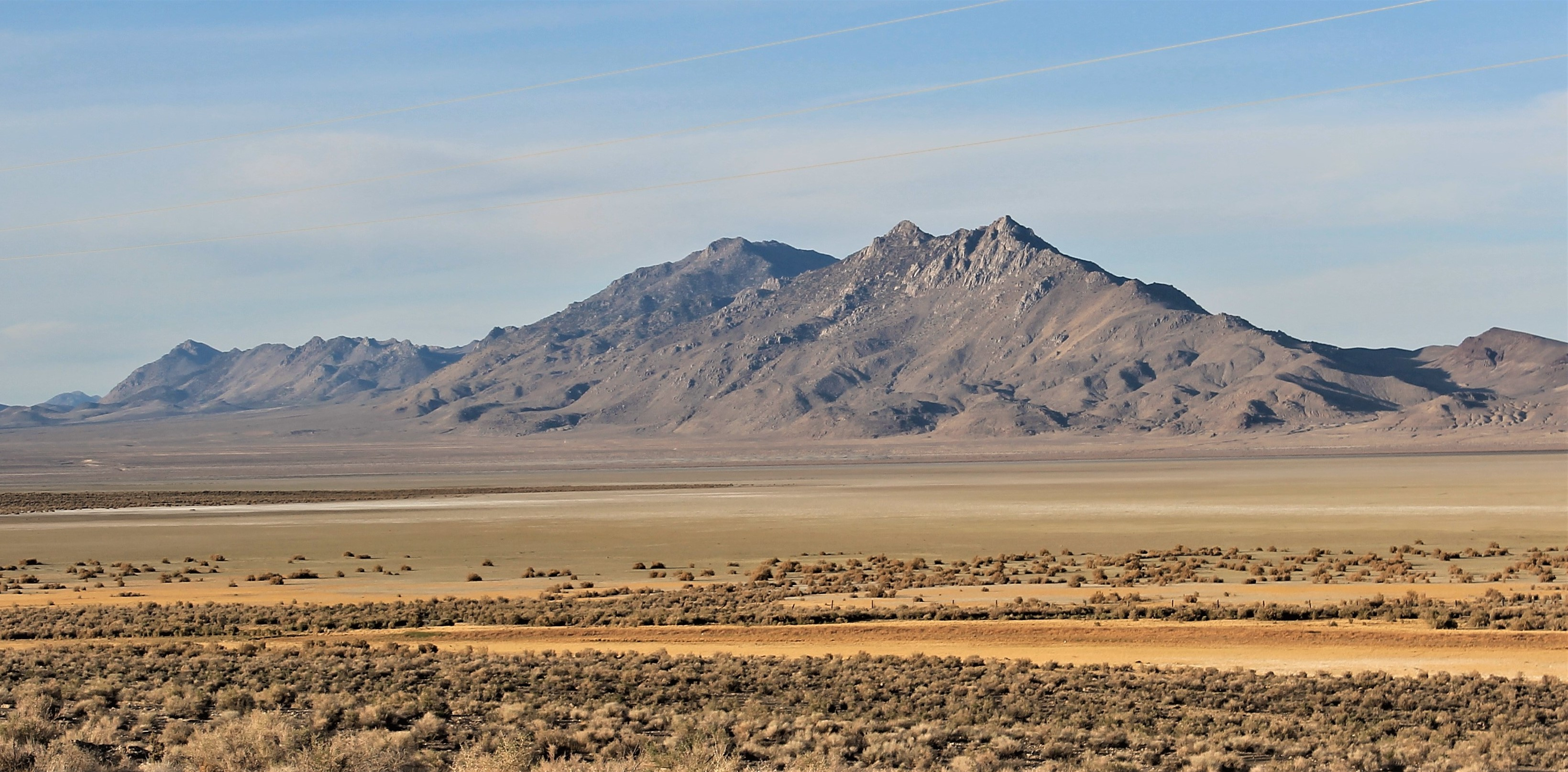
- Kumiva Peak centered. Purgatory Peak and Mount Limbo (right). South-southwest aspect from Highway 447

Highest point
- Elevation: 8,238 ft (2,511 m)
- Prominence: 3,660 ft (1,116 m)
- Parent peak: King Lear Peak (8,842 ft)
- Isolation: 27.27 mi (43.89 km)
- Coordinates: 40°24′23″N 119°15′49″W

Geography
- Location within Nevada Location within the United States
- Country: United States of America
- State: Nevada
- County: Pershing
- Parent range: Selenite Range; Great Basin Ranges
- Topo map: USGS Kumiva Peak

Geology
- Mountain type: Fault block

Climbing
- Easiest route: class 2 hiking

Kumiva Peak is an 8,238-foot elevation (2,511 m) summit located in Pershing County, Nevada, United States.

== Description ==
Kumiva Peak is the highest peak of the Selenite Range which is a subset of the Great Basin Ranges. This peak is set in the Mount Limbo Wilderness Study Area which is administered by the Bureau of Land Management. It is situated four miles (6.4 km) north of Purgatory Peak, six miles (9.7 km) south of Luxor Peak, and 13 miles (21 km) south-southeast of the town of Empire. Topographic relief is significant as the west slope rises over 3,200 feet (980 meters) above Poito Valley in two miles (3.2 km), and the east aspect rises 3,050 feet (930 meters) above Kumiva Valley in 1.5 miles (2.4 km). This landform's toponym has been officially adopted by the U.S. Board on Geographic Names, and has appeared in publications since at least 1877.

== Climate ==
Kumiva Peak is set within the Great Basin Desert which has hot summers and cold winters. The desert is an example of a cold desert climate as the desert's elevation makes temperatures cooler than lower elevation deserts. Due to the high elevation and aridity, temperatures drop sharply after sunset. Summer nights are comfortably cool. Winter highs are generally above freezing, and winter nights are bitterly cold, with temperatures often dropping well below freezing.

== See also ==
- List of mountain peaks of Nevada
- Great Basin
