= Downtown Reno Library =

Historic place in Nevada, United States

- Downtown Reno Library (listed as Washoe County Library)
- U.S. National Register of Historic Places
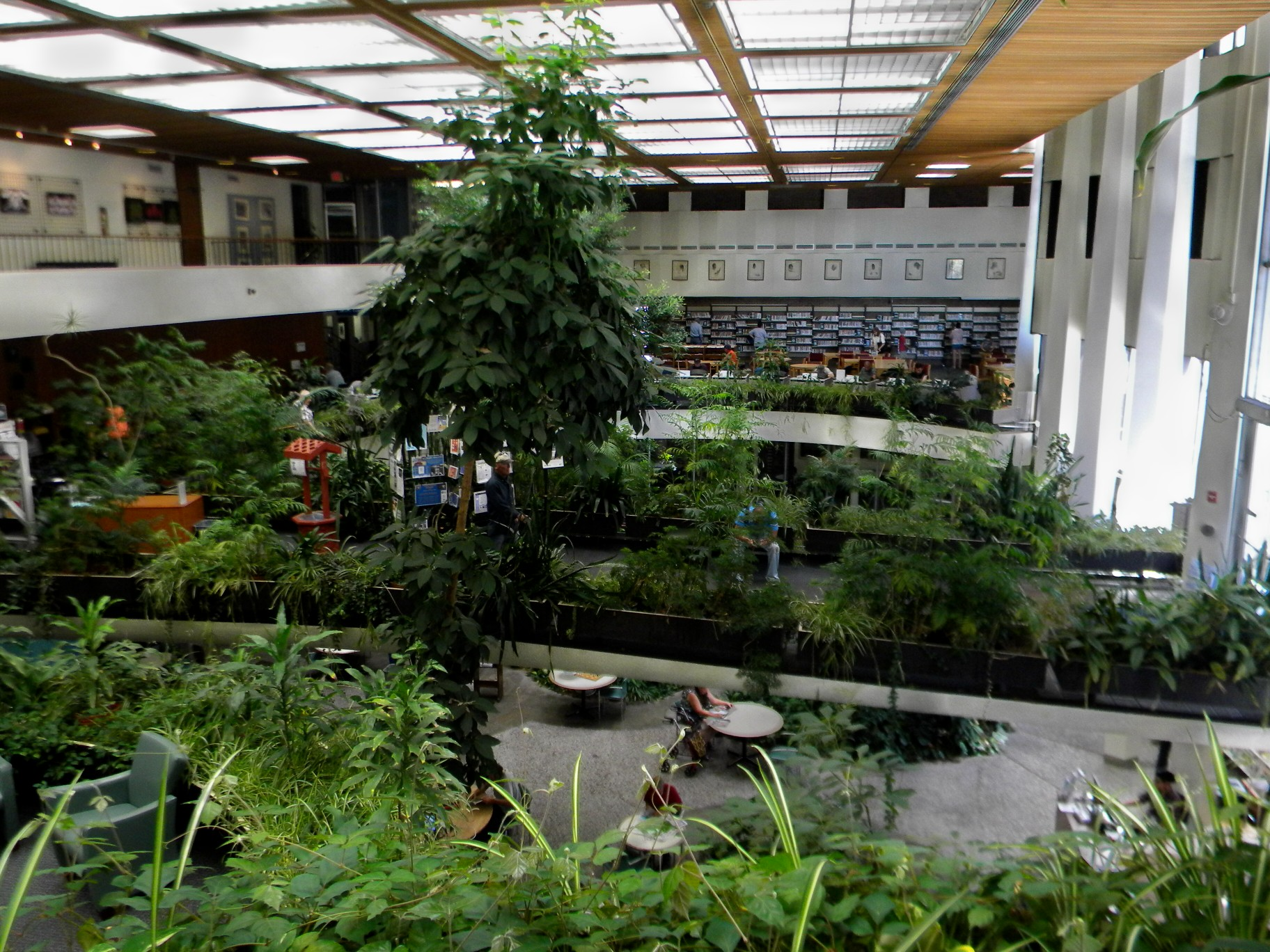
- The interior of the library

- Location within Nevada Location within the United States
- Location: 301 S. Center St., Reno, Nevada
- Coordinates: 39°31′20″N 119°48′37″W
- Built: 1965
- Architect: Hewitt C. Wells
- Architectural style: Modern
- NRHP reference No.: 13000011
- Added to NRHP: February 13, 2013

The Downtown Reno Library is the main library of the Washoe County Library System, at 301 S. Center St. in Reno, Nevada. It occupies a historic Modern-style building listed on the National Register of Historic Places as the Washoe County Library. It is known also as the Downtown Library. It was designed by Hewitt Campau Wells in Modern style and was built in 1965.

The building received the national Industrial Landscape Award in 1968 for its interior use of plants, shrubs, and trees as an integral part of its design. The award, presented by Lady Bird Johnson in Washington, D.C., was given specifically to architect Hewitt Wells, to landscape architect Mitchell Serven, and to Purdy and Fitzpatrick Nursery. Although the building was less than 50 years old, the usual requirement, it was listed on the National Register of Historic Places in 2013.

It has a fallout shelter which in 2015 was one of the few remaining ones in Reno.

In 2014 Cengage Learning gave the library the award "coolest internal space", giving the library $500.

== See also ==
- Washoe County Library-Sparks Branch (former building), also NRHP-listed
