= Purgatory Peak (Nevada) =

Mountain in Nevada, United States

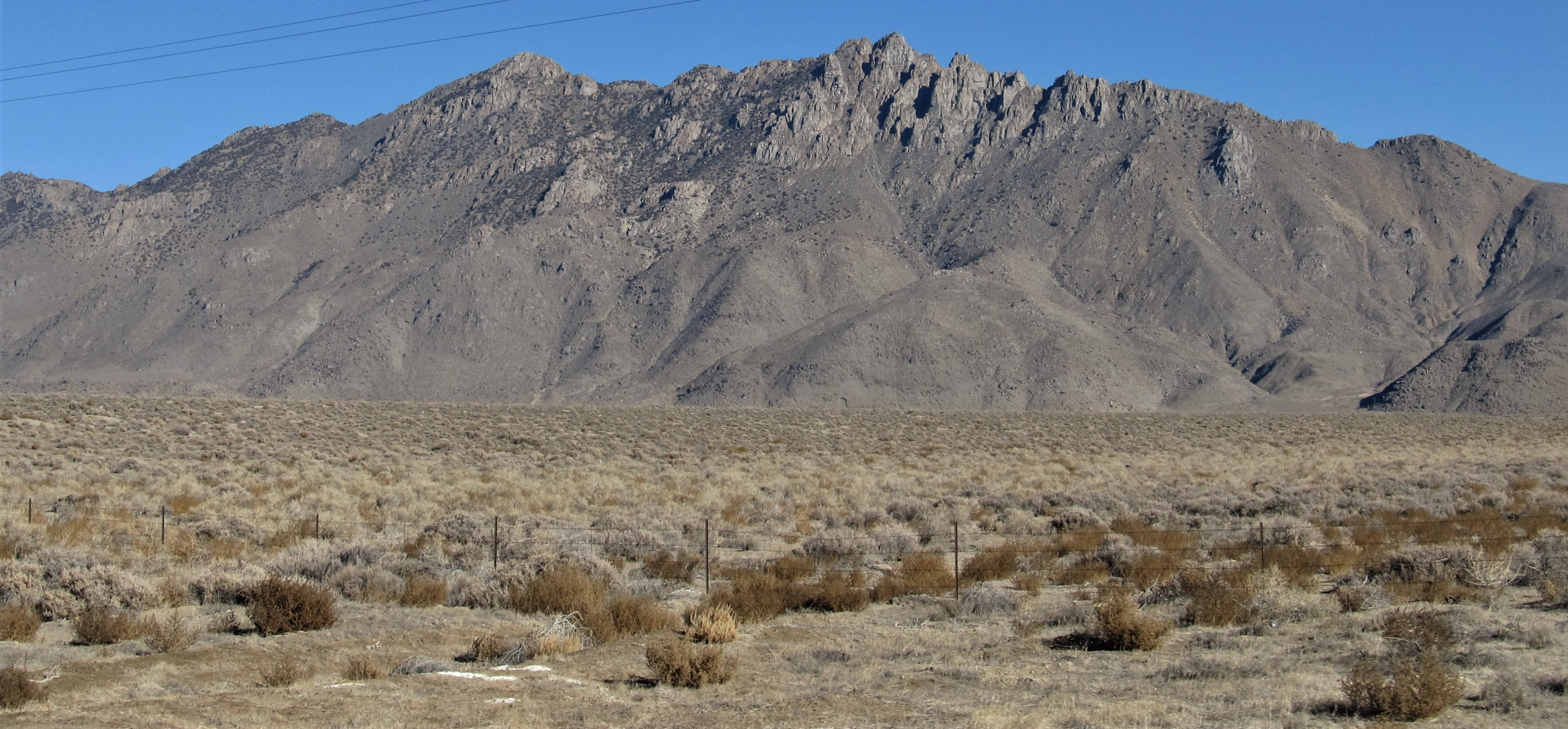
- Purgatory Peak (left), Mount Limbo (near center); Southwest aspect from Highway 447

Highest point
- Elevation: 7,417 ft (2,261 m)
- Prominence: 759 ft (231 m)
- Parent peak: Kumiva Peak (8,238 ft)
- Isolation: 4.17 mi (6.71 km)
- Coordinates: 40°20′52″N 119°17′00″W

Geography
- Location within Nevada Location within the United States
- Country: United States of America
- State: Nevada
- County: Pershing
- Parent range: Selenite Range; Great Basin Ranges
- Topo map: USGS Purgatory Peak

Geology
- Mountain type: Fault block
- Rock type: Granodiorite

Purgatory Peak is a 7,417-foot elevation (2,261 m) summit located in Pershing County, Nevada, United States.

== Description ==
Purgatory Peak is the third-highest peak of the Selenite Range which is a subset of the Great Basin Ranges. This peak is set in the Mount Limbo Wilderness Study Area which is owned by the Bureau of Land Management. It is situated four miles (6.4 km) south of line parent Kumiva Peak, 17 miles (27 km) south of the town of Empire, and north of Winnemucca Lake. Topographic relief is significant as the summit rises over 3,000 feet (910 meters) above Poito Valley in approximately one mile (1.6 km). This landform's toponym was officially adopted in 1965 by the U.S. Board on Geographic Names.

== Climate ==
Purgatory Peak is set in the Great Basin Desert which has hot summers and cold winters. The desert is an example of a cold desert climate as the desert's elevation makes temperatures cooler than lower elevation deserts. Due to the high elevation and aridity, temperatures drop sharply after sunset. Summer nights are comfortably cool. Winter highs are generally above freezing, and winter nights are bitterly cold, with temperatures often dropping well below freezing.

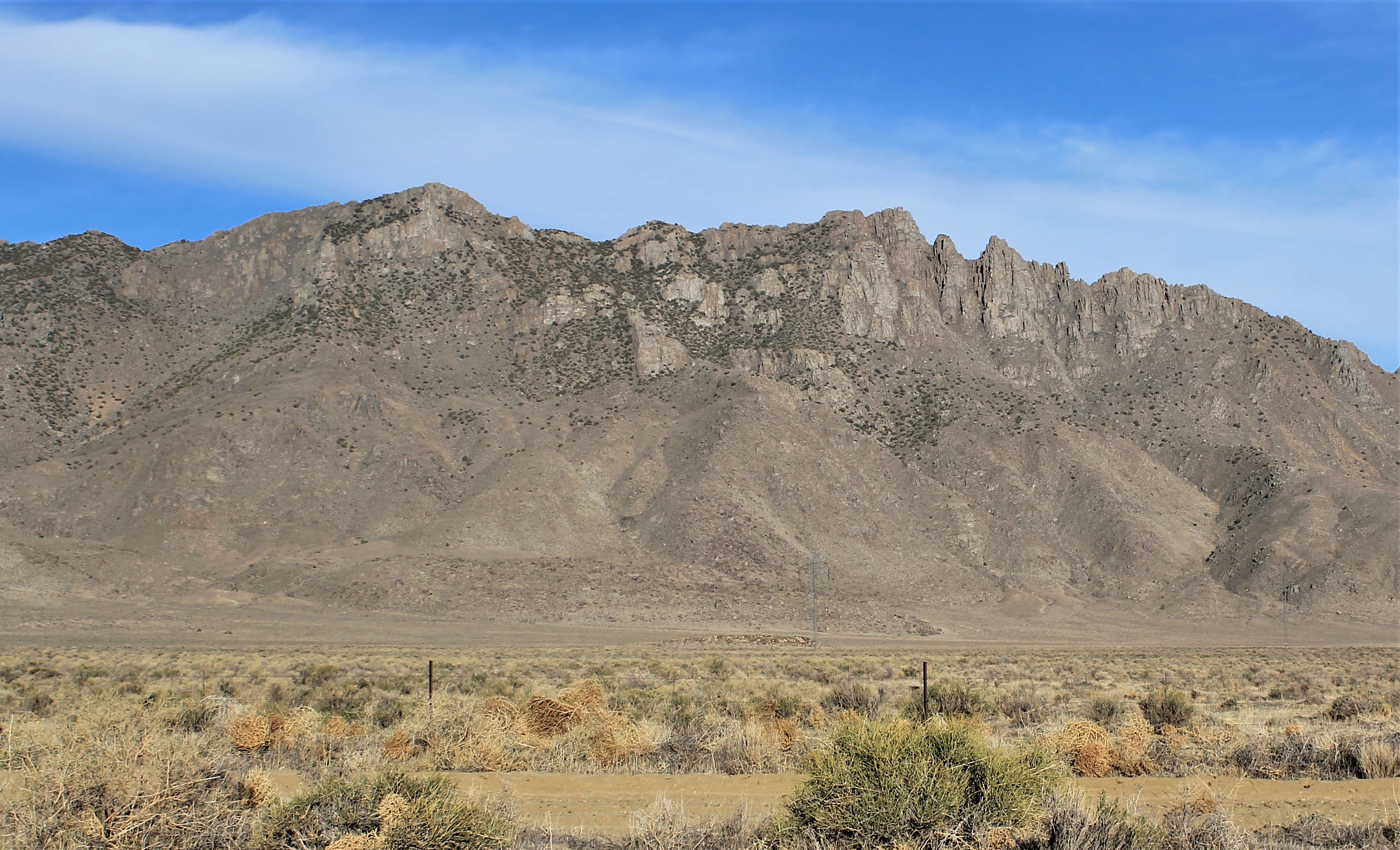
Purgatory Peak (left) and Mt. Limbo (right)

== See also ==
- Great Basin
