= KFBR =

Radio station in Gerlach, Nevada

- Gerlach, Nevada; United States
- Frequency: 91.5 MHz

Programming
- Format: Community radio

Ownership
- Owner: Burning Man Project

History
- First air date: January 2011
- Call sign meaning: Friends of Black Rock

Technical information
- Licensing authority: FCC
- Facility ID: 175807
- Class: A
- ERP: 600 watts
- HAAT: −116 m (−381 ft)
- Transmitter coordinates: 40°39′6.7″N 119°21′24.7″W

Links
- Public license information: Public file; LMS
- Website: blackrockdesert.org

KFBR (91.5 FM) is a radio station licensed to serve the community of Gerlach, Nevada. In 2022, the station was bought by the Burning Man Project for $6000.

The station was assigned the KFBR call letters by the Federal Communications Commission on December 15, 2010.
