= Luxor Peak =

Mountain in Pershing County, Nevada, United States

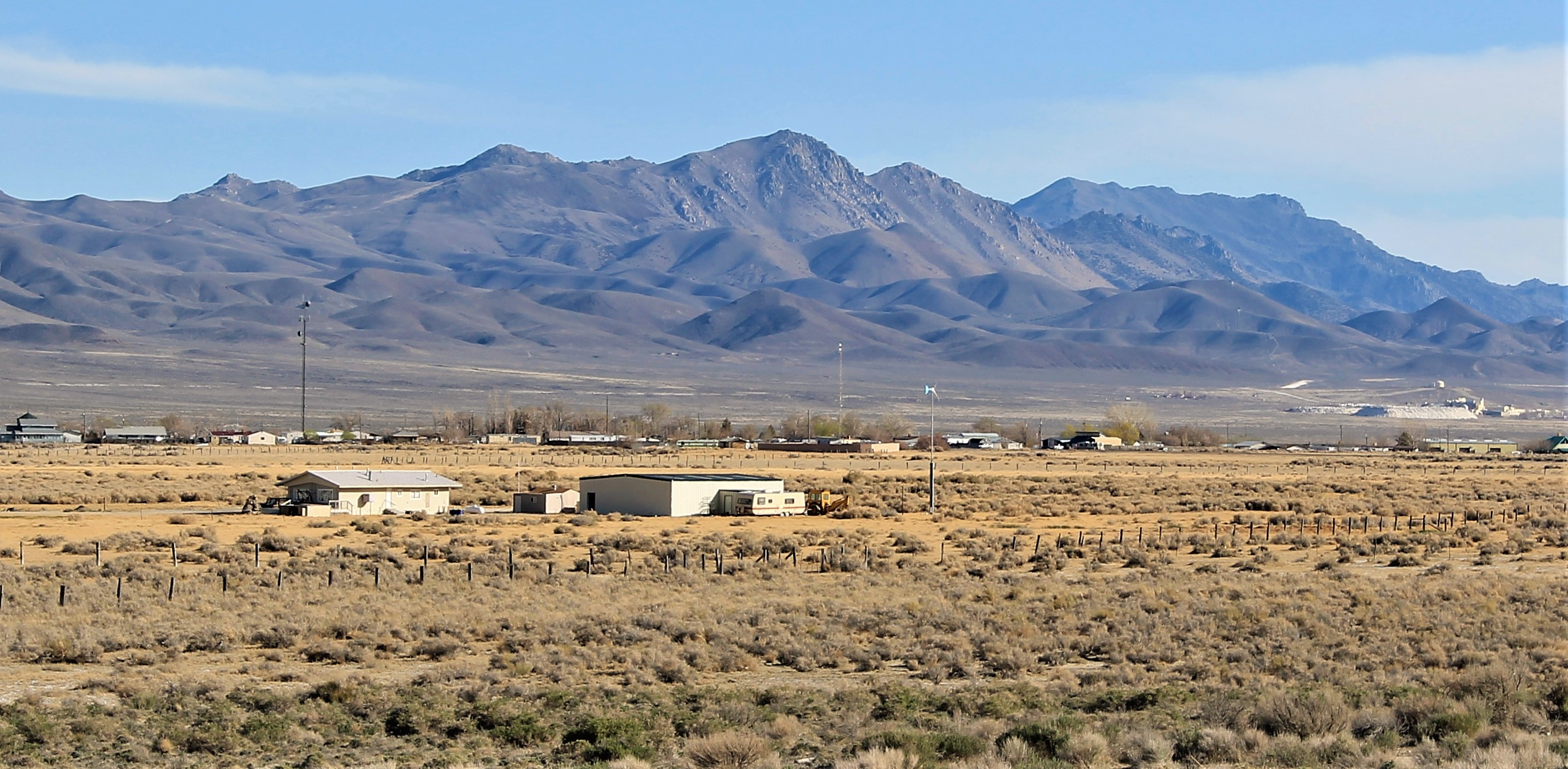
- Northwest aspect, centered (Line parent Kumiva Peak to distant right)

Highest point
- Elevation: 7,420 ft (2,262 m)
- Prominence: 1,170 ft (357 m)
- Parent peak: Kumiva Peak (8,238 ft)
- Isolation: 5.86 mi (9.43 km)
- Coordinates: 40°29′22″N 119°17′03″W

Geography
- Location within Nevada Location within the United States
- Country: United States of America
- State: Nevada
- County: Pershing
- Parent range: Selenite Range; Great Basin Ranges
- Topo map: USGS Kumiva Peak

Geology
- Mountain type: Fault block

Luxor Peak is a 7,420-foot elevation (2,262 m) summit located in Pershing County, Nevada, United States.

== Description ==
Luxor Peak is the second-highest peak of the Selenite Range which is a subset of the Great Basin Ranges. This peak is set on land managed by the Bureau of Land Management. It is situated eight miles (13 km) south of Selenite Peak, six miles (9.7 km) north of line parent Kumiva Peak, and seven miles (11 km) south-southeast of the town of Empire. Topographic relief is significant as the west slope rises 2,000 feet (610 meters) in one-half mile. The large Empire gypsum quarry lies below the west slope of Luxor Peak. The Selenite Range was named for deposits of selenite, a variety of gypsum. This landform's toponym has been officially adopted by the U.S. Board on Geographic Names.

== Climate ==
Luxor Peak is set at the southern edge of the Black Rock Desert which has hot summers and cold winters. The desert is an example of a cold desert climate as the desert's elevation makes temperatures cooler than lower elevation deserts. Due to the high elevation and aridity, temperatures drop sharply after sunset. Summer nights are comfortably cool. Winter highs are generally above freezing, and winter nights are bitterly cold, with temperatures often dropping well below freezing.

== See also ==
- Great Basin
