= Selenite Peak =

Summit in Pershing County, Nevada, US

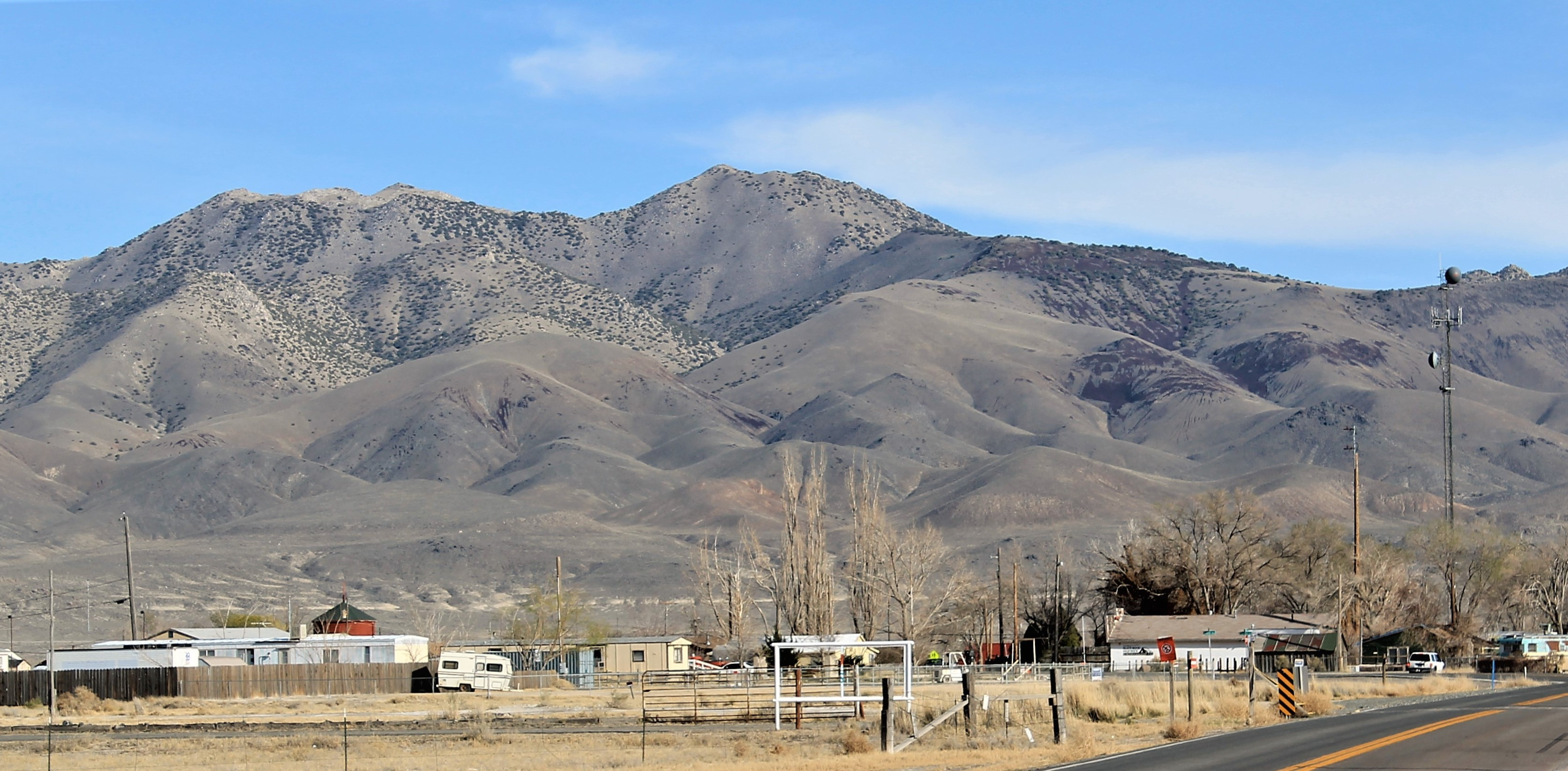
- Northwest aspect, from Gerlach

Highest point
- Elevation: 7,115 ft (2,169 m)
- Prominence: 1,775 ft (541 m)
- Parent peak: Luxor Peak (7,420 ft)
- Isolation: 8.11 mi (13.05 km)
- Coordinates: 40°36′22″N 119°15′58″W

Naming
- Etymology: Selenite

Geography
- Location within Nevada Location within the United States
- Location: Black Rock Desert
- Country: United States of America
- State: Nevada
- County: Pershing
- Parent range: Selenite Range; Great Basin Ranges
- Topo map: USGS Empire

Geology
- Mountain type: Fault block

Selenite Peak is a 7,115-foot elevation (2,169 m) summit located in Pershing County, Nevada, United States.

== Description ==
Selenite Peak is the fifth-highest peak of the Selenite Range which is a subset of the Great Basin Ranges. This peak is set on land managed by the Bureau of Land Management, and is the highest point of the BLM's Selenite Mountains Wilderness Study Area. It is situated six miles (9.7 km) southeast of the town of Gerlach, and five miles (8.0 km) northeast of Empire. Topographic relief is significant as the summit rises 3,100 feet (940 meters) above the valley floor in three miles. This landform's toponym has been officially adopted by the U.S. Board on Geographic Names.

== Climate ==
Selenite Peak is set in the Black Rock Desert which has hot summers and cold winters. The desert is an example of a cold desert climate as the desert's elevation makes temperatures cooler than lower elevation deserts. Due to the high elevation and aridity, temperatures drop sharply after sunset. Summer nights are comfortably cool. Winter highs are generally above freezing, and winter nights are bitterly cold, with temperatures often dropping well below freezing.

== Gallery ==
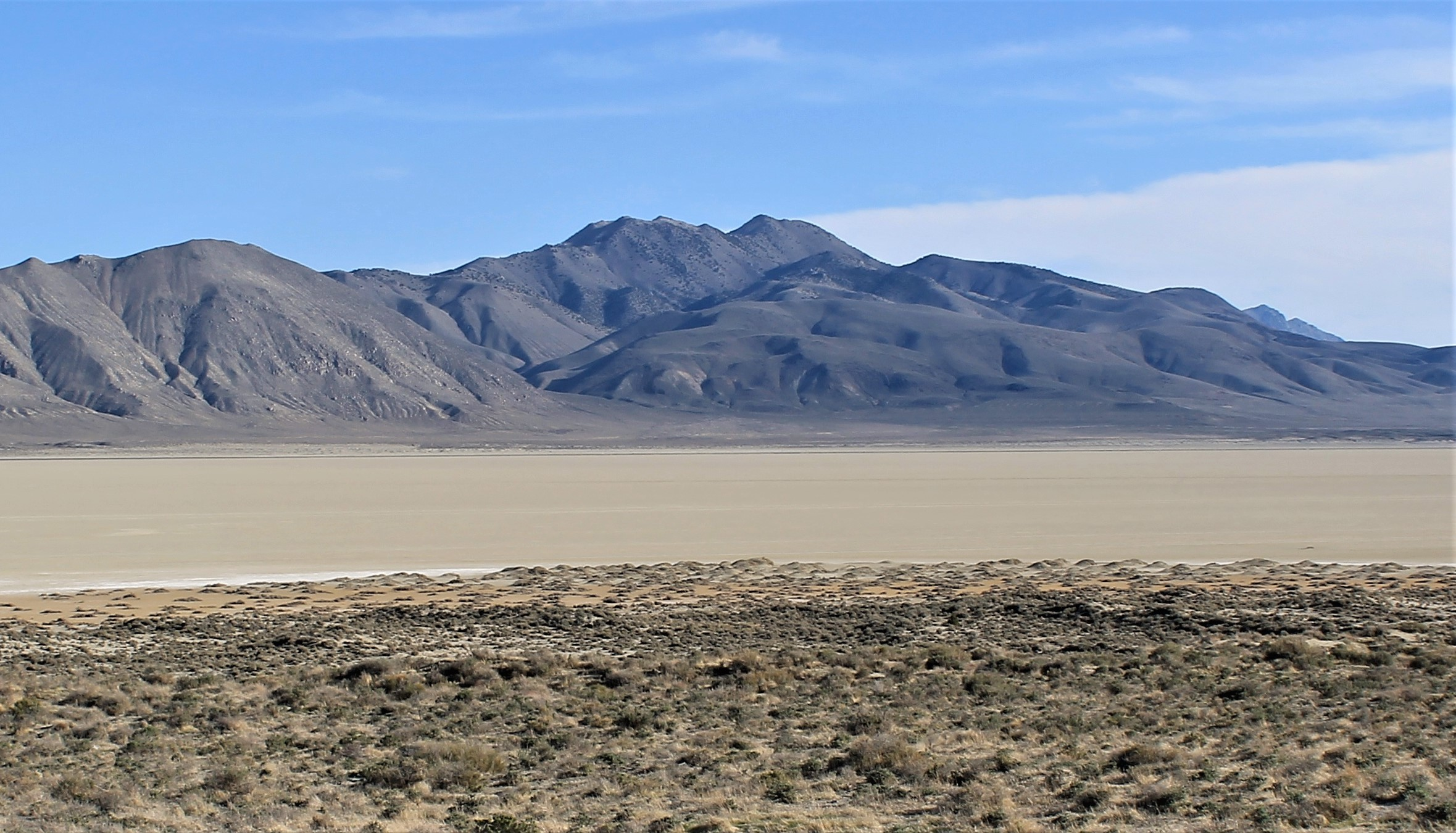
North aspect

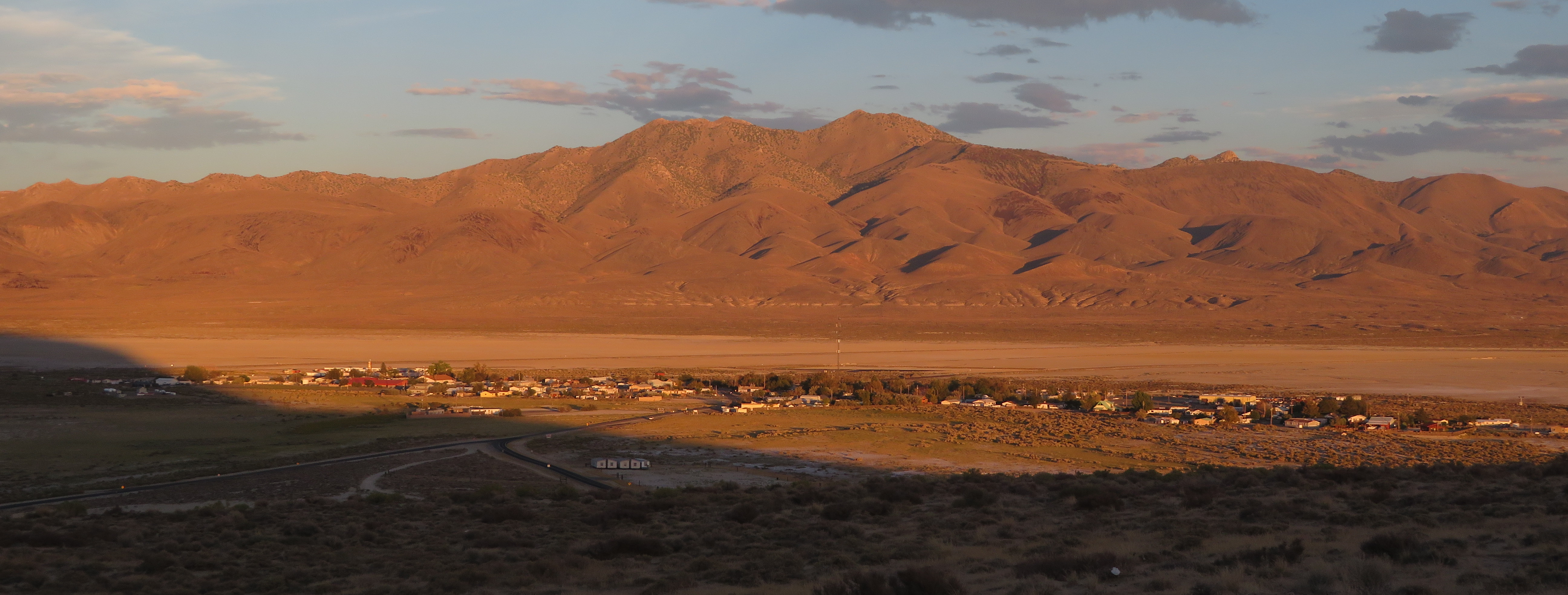
Selenite Peak and Gerlach at sunset

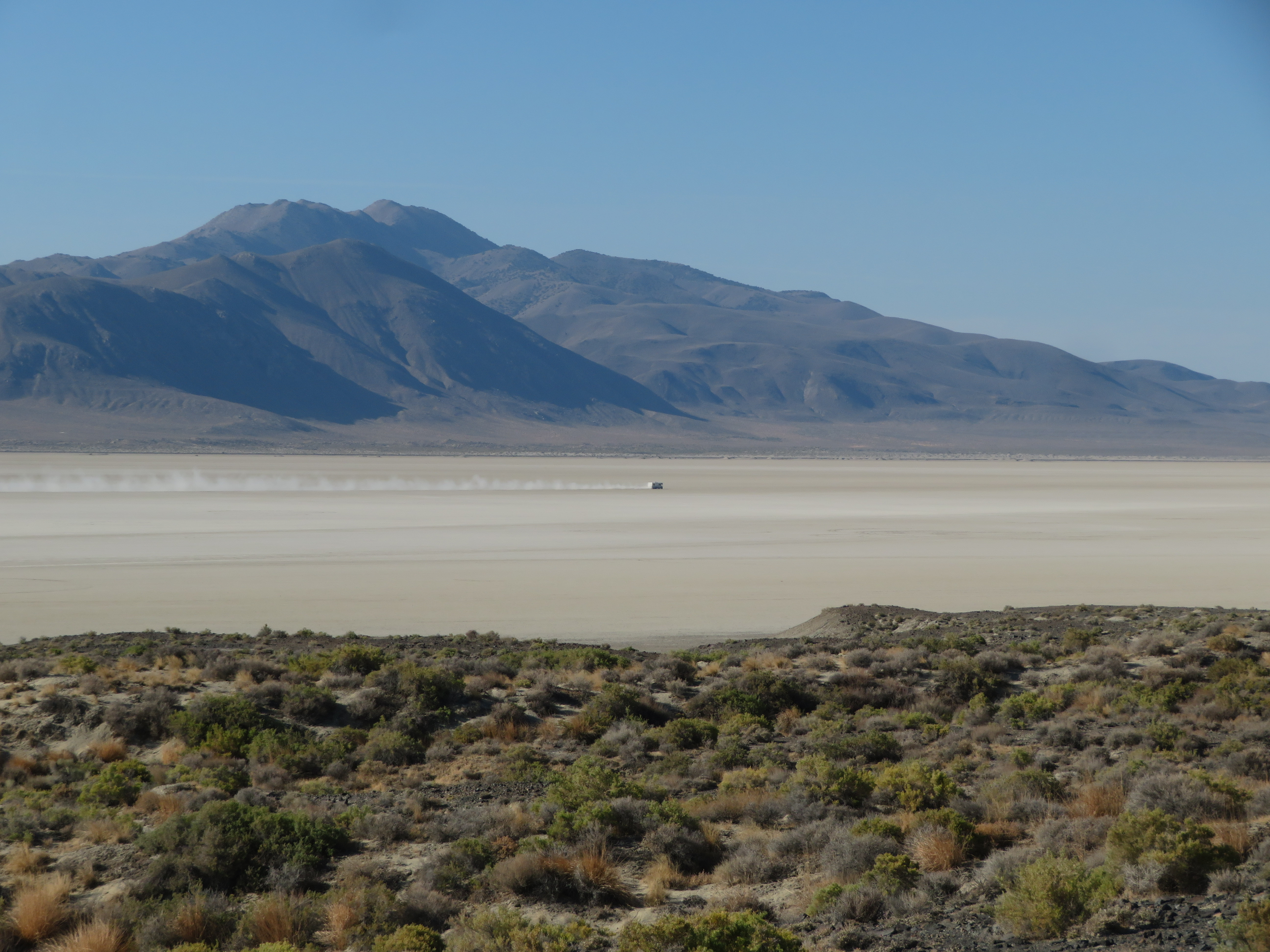
North aspect

== See also ==
- Great Basin
