= Gerlach K–12 School =

Public K-12 school in Gerlach, Nevada

Coordinates: 40.6532°N 119.3536°W

- Gerlach, Nevada; United States

Information
- Former name: Gerlach High School
- Established: 1931; 95 years ago
- School district: Washoe County School District
- Grades: K-12
- Enrollment: 8 (2016)
- Website: www.washoeschools.net/gerlach

Gerlach K-12 School is a public K-12 school in Gerlach, Nevada. A part of the Washoe County School District, its attendance boundary includes Gerlach and Empire.

It is about 110 miles (180 km) north of Reno.

It includes a branch of the Washoe County Library System.

== History ==
The facility was previously Gerlach High School, a grade 6-12 school as of 2001. It opened in 1931, and got a new building in 1955 as the original building was destroyed by a fire. The fire occurred in January 1955. In the 1970s, the school's grade spread was 5-12 and it had a teacher-student ratio at 1 to 9. By 1976, the school consolidated all grade levels in a single building to have more efficient use of employees, as the area population had declined. It was renovated circa the late 1990s.

Ernest M. Johnson Elementary School, initially an elementary school in Empire, moved to the Gerlach High site in Gerlach in 2001. By 2000, the school's address was already in Gerlach. It was to be housed in an eight classroom wing attached to the high school facility that was to open in fall 2002.

Johnson became a K-12 school in 2011.

== Student body ==
Prior to fall 2000, enrollment was at 125 for the entire K-12 facility, with 55 students at Johnson Elementary and 70 students at Gerlach High. By that time, the schools had one aide for English as a second language (ESL) purposes as an increasing number of students had that classification. The students were children of employees at Empire Farms and U.S. Gypsum. At one point, enrollment was 80, and there were 20 employees. By 2016, U.S. Gypsum had curtailed operations, and enrollment was down to eight with three full-time employees along with some part-time employees.

There are different ethnic groups among the student body, majority are whites followed by Hispanic/Latino.

== Operations ==
Washoe County Public Schools maintains faculty housing through mobile homes in a way to retain staff.
