= Selenite Range =

Mountain range in Pershing County, Nevada, US

- Location within Nevada

Highest point
- Peak: Kumiva Peak
- Elevation: 2,511 m (8,238 ft)
- Coordinates: 40°24.37′N 119°15.79′W

Geography
- Country: United States
- State: Nevada
- Region: Black Rock Desert
- District: Pershing County
- Range coordinates: 40°32′3″N 119°15′44″W
- Topo map: USGS Empire

The Selenite Range is a mountain range in western Pershing County, Nevada. The range is a north–south trending feature approximately 27 miles (43 km) long and 4 miles (6.4 km) wide.

The Fox Range lies to the west across the San Emidio Desert valley and the south end of the Black Rock Desert playa. Gerlach and Empire are two communities on the foothills and just to the northwest of the range. These communities supported the gypsum mines in the range during their active period. The large Empire gypsum quarry lies just west of Luxor Peak at 40° 30' N; 119° 18' W just 1.2 mi (1.9 km) northwest of Kumiva Peak. The range was named for deposits of selenite, a variety of gypsum.

Named Peaks in the range from north to south include: Selenite Peak, 7,115 ft (2,169 m); Luxor Peak, 7,420 ft (2,260 m); Kumiva Peak, 8,238 ft (2,511 m); Purgatory Peak, 7,417 ft (2,261 m); and Mt. Limbo, 7,312 ft (2,229 m).
