= Hewitt C. Wells =

American architect

Hewitt Campau Wells
- Born: 1915; Washington, D.C.
- Died: October 2, 1989 (aged 73–74); Santa Rosa, California, U.S.
- Education: Choate Rosemary Hall; Princeton University
- Occupation: Architect
- Spouse: Marian Wells
- Children: 2 daughters

Hewitt C. Wells (1915 - October 2, 1989) was an American architect. He designed buildings in San Francisco, California and Nevada, including the National Register of Historic Places-listed Washoe County Library in Reno.

== Life ==
Wells was born in 1915 in Washington, D.C. He was educated at Choate Rosemary Hall, and he graduated from Princeton University with a bachelor's degree in 1938 and a master's degree in 1940. He served in the United States Navy on board the USS Bailey during World War II, earning three battle stars.

Wells began his career by working for architect Albert Kahn in Detroit, Michigan. He later designed at least two buildings in San Francisco, California: the Franciscan Restaurant in Fisherman's Wharf, and a residential skyscraper in Russian Hill in the International Style. He relocated to Reno, Nevada in 1960, where he designed several government buildings, including an addition to the Washoe County Courthouse. He also designed the Washoe County Library in Reno, listed on the National Register of Historic Places, and the John W. Calhoun Annex of the Nevada State Museum in Carson City. Wells taught at the Truckee Meadows Community College, and he exhibited his watercolor paintings.

Wells had a wife, Marian, two daughters, and two stepsons. He died on October 2, 1989, in Santa Rosa, California. He was eulogized by Nevada Supreme Court Associate Justice Clarence Clifton Young at a memorial service held in Reno on October 30, 1989.
