= Fly Geyser =

Small geothermal geyser in Nevada, United States

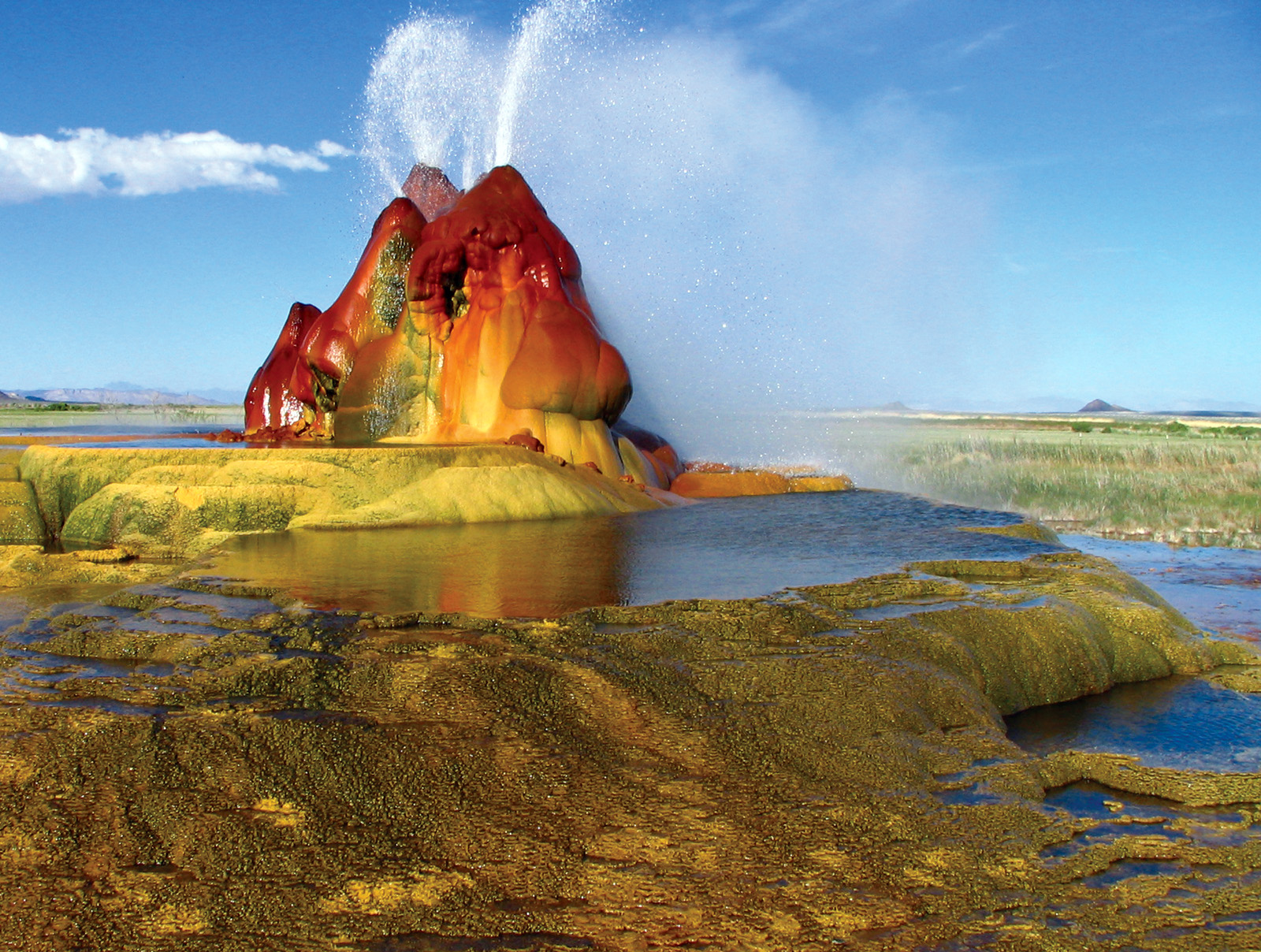

- Location within Nevada Location within the United States
- Interactive map of Fly Geyser
- Name origin: Named after Fly Ranch
- Location: Fly Ranch, Washoe County, Nevada
- Coordinates: 40°51′34″N 119°19′55″W
- Elevation: 4,014 feet (1,223 m)
- Type: Cone-type geyser
- Eruption height: 5 feet (1.5 m) and growing
- Frequency: Constant
- Duration: Constant
- Temperature: 93.0 °C (199.4 °F)

Fly Geyser, also known as Fly Ranch Geyser, is a small geothermal geyser located on private land in Washoe County, Nevada, about 20 miles (32 km) north of Gerlach. Fly Geyser is located near the edge of Fly Reservoir in the Hualapai Geothermal Flats and is approximately 5 feet (1.5 m) high by 12 feet (3.7 m) wide, counting the mound on which it sits.

In June 2016, the non-profit Burning Man Project purchased the 3,800-acre (1,500 ha) Fly Ranch, including the geyser, for $6.5 million. The Burning Man Project began offering limited public access to the property in May 2018. The geyser contains thermophilic bacteria and archaea, which flourish in moist, hot environments, resulting in multiple hues of green and red, coloring the rocks.

== Location ==
Fly Geyser is located on the Fly Ranch in Hualapai Flat, about 0.3 miles (0.48 km) from State Route 34 and about 25 miles (40 km) north of Gerlach, Nevada. It is west of Black Rock Desert.

== Origin ==
The source of the Fly Geyser field's heat is attributed to a very deep pool of hot rock where tectonic rifting and faulting are common.

The first geyser at the site was formed in 1916 when a well was drilled seeking irrigation water. When geothermal water at close to boiling point was found, the well was abandoned, and a 10-to-12-foot (3.0–3.7 m) calcium carbonate cone formed.

In 1964, a geothermal energy company drilled a second well near the site of the first well. The water was not hot enough for energy purposes. They reportedly capped the well, but the seal failed. The discharge from the second well released sufficient pressure that the original geyser dried up. Dissolved minerals in the water, including calcium carbonate and silica, accumulated around the new geyser, creating the cones and travertine pools.

The geyser has multiple conic openings sitting on a mound: the cones are about 6 feet (1.8 m), and the entire mound is 25 to 30 feet (7.6–9.1 m) tall.

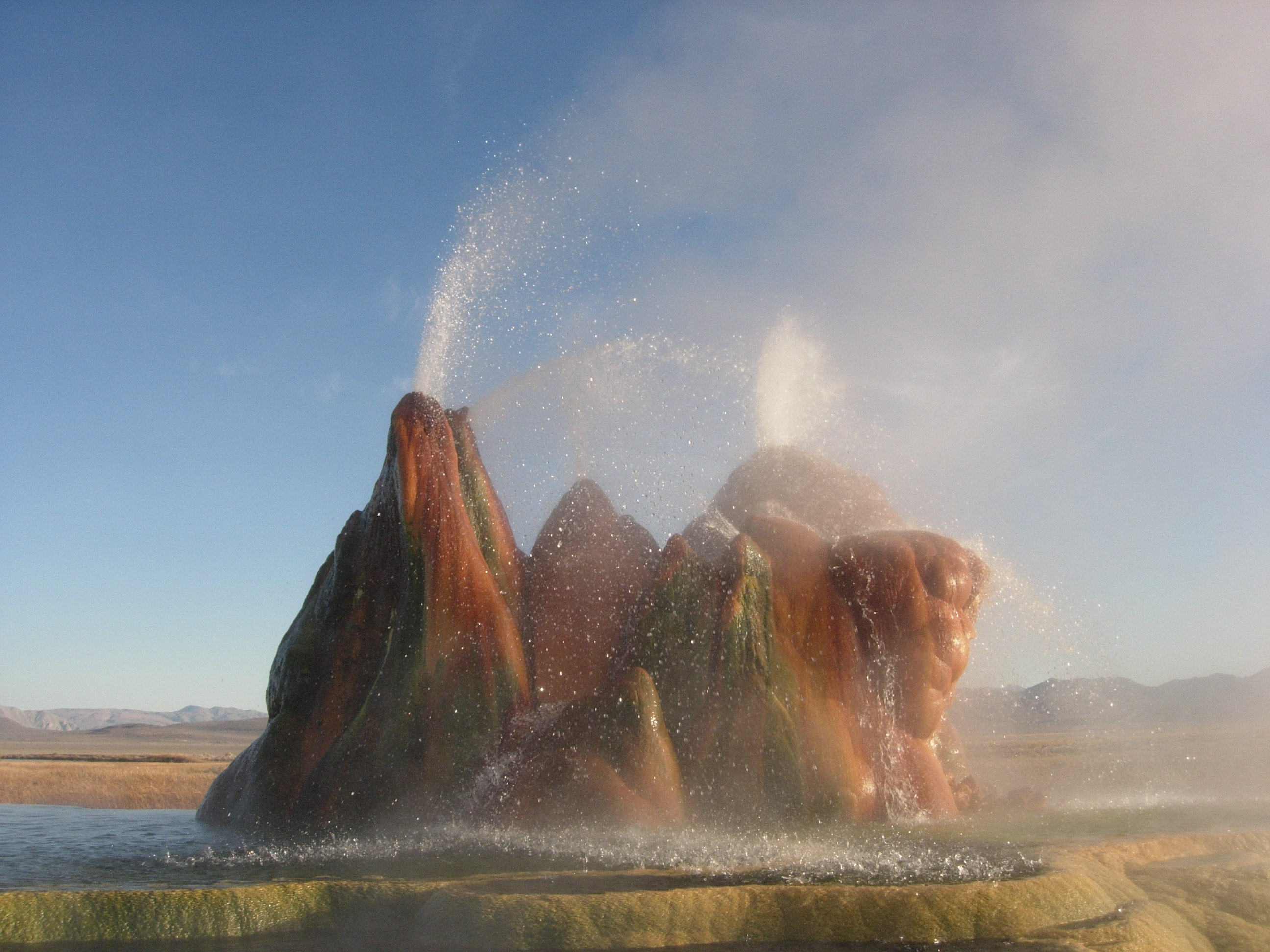
The Fly Geyser is the result of man-made drilling in 1916, when water well drilling accidentally penetrated a geothermal source. 2009 photo.

== Characteristics ==
The temperature of the water exiting the geyser can exceed 200 °F (93 °C), which is typical for geysers at high elevation.

Carolina Muñoz Saez, who was hired by the Burning Man owners to study the geyser, reported that the geyser contains "a really high amount of silica." The silica combined with the temperature has caused quartz to form inside the geyser extraordinarily quickly. Quartz typically takes up to 10,000 years to develop in geysers. Saez said the Fly Geyser is unlike any other geyser she has studied.

Water is constantly released, reaching 5 feet (1.5 m) in the air. The geyser has formed several travertine terraces, creating 30 to 40 pools over an area of 74 acres (30 ha). The water produced by the geyser contains thermophilic algae, which flourish in moist, hot environments, coloring the rocks with brilliant hues of green and red.

== Public access ==
Fly Ranch is open to small, guided three-hour nature walks from April to October of each year. The geyser is part of the nature walk. Tours are managed and led by the Friends of Black Rock-High Rock.

Payments for tickets for the walk are considered to be donations and are used to support Fly Ranch and the Friends organization.

== Other local geysers ==
A prior well-drilling attempt in 1917 resulted in the creation of a geyser close to the currently active Fly Geyser; it created a pillar of calcium carbonate about 12 feet (3.7 m) tall, but ceased when the Fly Geyser began releasing water in 1964.
