= Gerlach Water Tower =

Historic railway structure in Nevada

- U.S. National Register of Historic Places
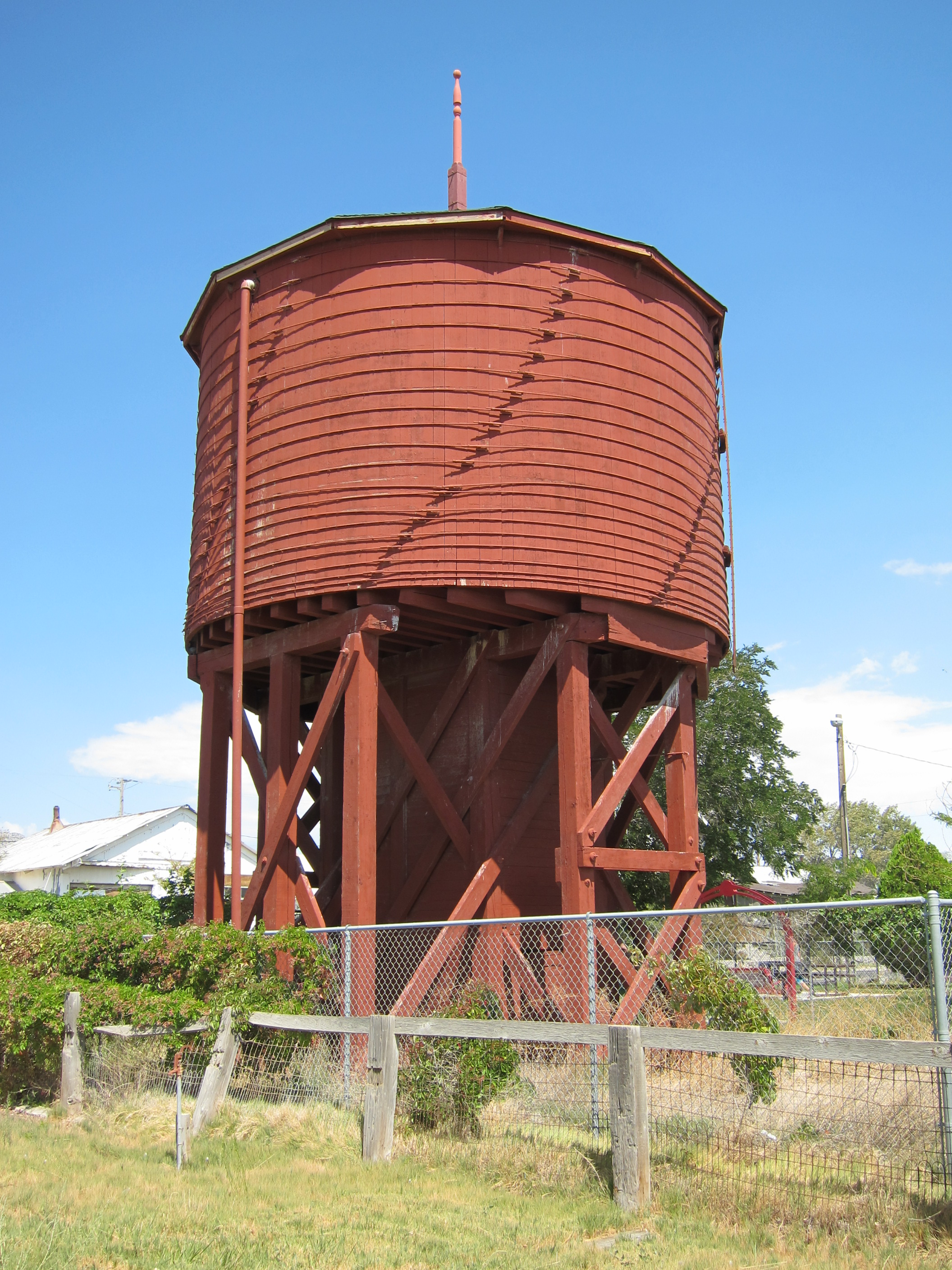

- Location within Nevada Location within the United States
- Location: Main St., Gerlach, Nevada
- Coordinates: 40°39′5″N 119°21′13″W
- Area: less than one acre
- Built: 1909
- Built by: Utah Construction Co.
- NRHP reference No.: 81000385
- Added to NRHP: October 29, 1981

The Gerlach Water Tower, on Main Street in Gerlach, Nevada, was built in 1909 by the Utah Construction Company.

It has a 44,000 US gallons (170,000 L; 37,000 imp gal) capacity redwood tank. It served locomotives of the Western Pacific Railroad Company and also the company town of Gerlach. It was listed on the National Register of Historic Places in 1981.
