= Gerlach–Empire, Nevada =

- Former CDP
- Location of Gerlach–Empire, Nevada
- Coordinates: 40°37′22″N 119°20′29″W
- Country: United States
- State: Nevada

Area
  - Total: 94.1 sq mi (243.7 km^{2})
  - Land: 94.1 sq mi (243.7 km^{2})
  - Water: 0 sq mi (0.0 km^{2})

Population (2000)
  - Total: 499
  - Density: 5.30/sq mi (2.05/km^{2})
- Time zone: UTC-8 (Pacific (PST))
  - Summer (DST): UTC-7 (PDT)
- Area code: 775
- FIPS code: 32-27325

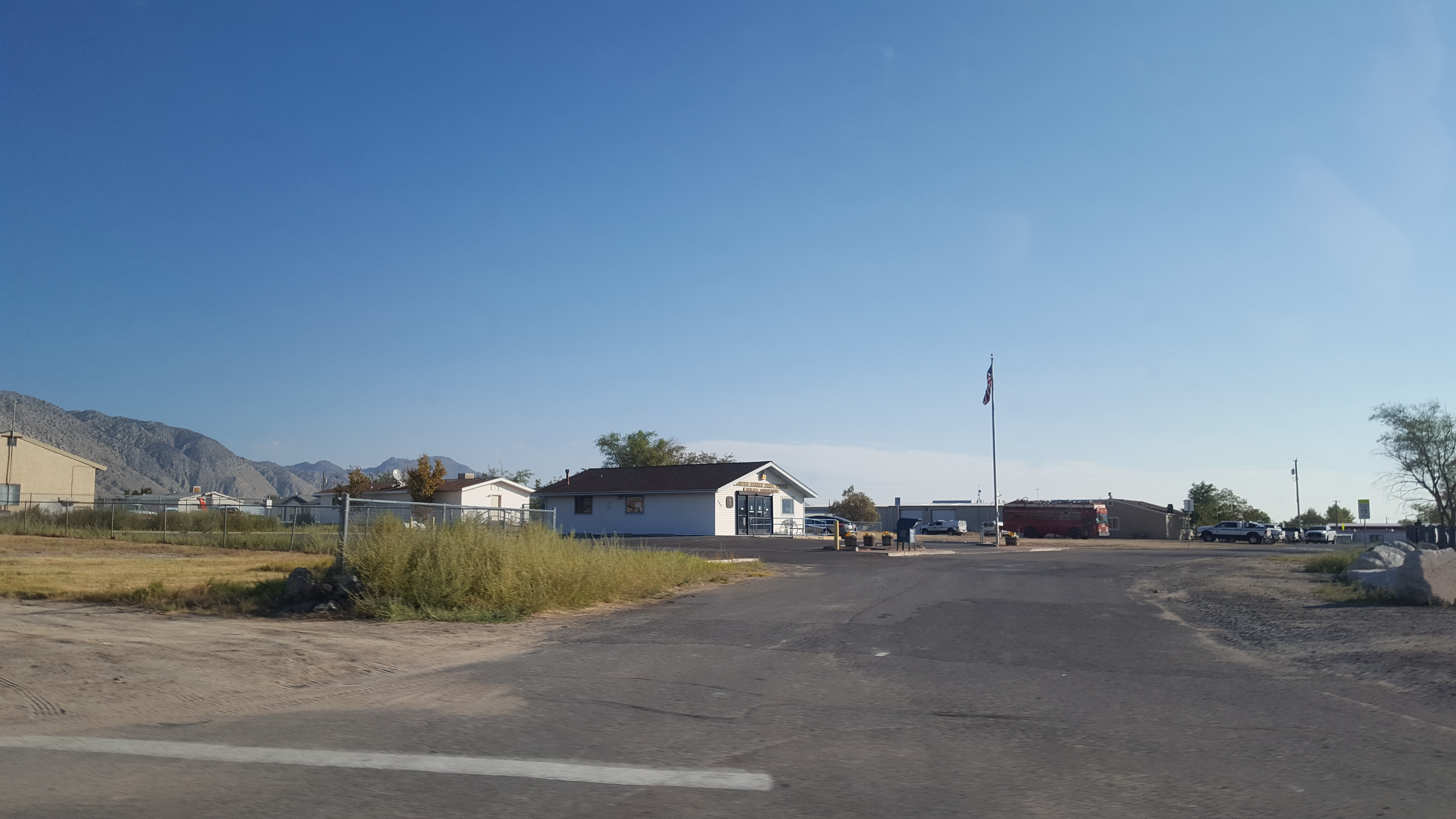
Post office in Gerlach

Gerlach–Empire was a census-designated place (CDP) in Washoe County, Nevada, United States. It was replaced by the separate CDPs of Gerlach and Empire for the 2010 census. The combined population was 499 at the 2000 census. A former company town for United States Gypsum Corporation, Empire was once home to more than 750 people. It is part of the Reno–Sparks Metropolitan Statistical Area. Most of the population lives in the two tiny settlements of Gerlach, a neighboring hamlet with fewer than 200 people that shares its schools with Empire; the rest live on outlying rural ranching properties. The nearest town, Nixon, is 60 miles to the south on a reservation owned by the Pyramid Lake Paiute Tribe.

== History ==
The former CDP of Empire was established with the founding of the gypsum mine in 1923, and U.S. Gypsum owned and supported the town starting from the year 1946.

== Geography ==
According to the United States Census Bureau, the CDP in 2000 had a total area of 94.1 mi^{2} (244 km^{2}), all land. Its elevation is 3,946 ft (1,203 m).

== Demographics ==
As of the census of 2000, there were 499 people, 234 households, and 146 families residing in the CDP. The population density was 5.3 people per square mile (2.0/km^{2}). There were 297 housing units at an average density of 3.2 per square mile (1.2/km^{2}). The racial makeup of the CDP was 91.18% White, 2.81% Native American, 0.20% Asian, 4.61% from other races, and 1.20% from two or more races. Hispanic or Latino of any race were 11.02% of the population.

There were 234 households, out of which 26.1% had children under the age of 18 living with them, 48.3% were married couples living together, 9.8% had a female householder with no husband present, and 37.2% were non-families. 34.2% of all households were made up of individuals, and 6.8% had someone living alone who was 65 years of age or older. The average household size was 2.13 and the average family size was 2.71.

In the CDP, the population was spread out, with 22.6% under the age of 18, 7.0% from 18 to 24, 31.5% from 25 to 44, 29.5% from 45 to 64, and 9.4% who were 65 years of age or older. The median age was 38 years. For every 100 females there were 116.0 males. For every 100 females age 18 and over, there were 120.6 males.

The median income for a household in the CDP was $35,088, and the median income for a family was $43,125. Males had a median income of $36,000 versus $23,056 for females. The per capita income for the CDP was $14,793. About 10.3% of families and 14.6% of the population were below the poverty line, including 15.8% of those under age 18 and 12.7% of those age 65 or over.
