= Empire Airport (Michigan) =

Airport in Michigan, United States

William B. Bolton Airport
- IATA: none; ICAO: none; FAA LID: Y87

Summary
- Airport type: Public
- Owner: Empire Village & Township
- Serves: Empire, Michigan
- Time zone: UTC−05:00 (-5)
  - Summer (DST): UTC−04:00 (-4)
- Elevation AMSL: 944 ft (288 m)
- Coordinates: 44°47′15″N 086°00′15″W
- Website: https://www.empireairport.com/
- Interactive map of William B. Bolton Airport

Runways
Direction	Length		Surface
Direction	ft	m	Surface
17/35	2,600	792	Asphalt
9/27	2,275	693	Turf

Statistics (2018)
- Aircraft operations: 504
- Based Aircraft: 3
- Source: Federal Aviation Administration

William B. Bolton Airport (FAA LID: Y87), also known as Empire Airport, is a public use airport located three nautical miles (6 km) southeast of the central business district of Empire, a village in Empire Township, Leelanau County, Michigan, United States. The airport is owned by the village and township.

The airport has a history of hosting snowmobile gatherings and races.

== Facilities and aircraft ==
William B. Bolton Airport covers an area of 130 acres (53 ha) at an elevation of 944 feet (288 m) above mean sea level. It has two runways: runway 17/35 is 2,600 by 50 feet (792 x 15 m) with an asphalt surface; runway 9/27 is 2,235 by 150 feet (681 x 46 m) with a turf surface. Runway 9/27 is closed from December through March and when snow-covered.

For the 12-month period ending December 31, 2018, the airport had 504 aircraft operators per year, an average of 42 per month. It was all general aviation. For the same time period, 3 aircraft are based at the airport, all single-engine airplanes.

The airport does not have a fixed-base operator, and no fuel is available.

== Accidents and incidents ==
- On July 9, 2003, a Cessna 182 Skylane sustained substantial damage during a forced landing following a loss of engine power while on initial climb from Empire Airport. There were no anomalies during the engine runup check. The pilot reported that the airplane "wasn't getting lift" during the takeoff roll, so he increased engine power to the maximum. The pilot reported after the airplane became airborne the stall warning horn sounded and he responded by lowering the airplane's nose, just clearing a pine tree in the process. The pilot stated he attempted to climb, but the stall warning horn sounded again and the airplane subsequently impacted a cherry-tree orchard near the departure end of the runway. The probable cause was found to be the pilot's failure to abort the takeoff. A contributing factor to the accident included the pilot's failure to utilize all available engine power during the entire takeoff.

== See also ==
- List of airports in Michigan
