= Empire Airport (Nevada) =

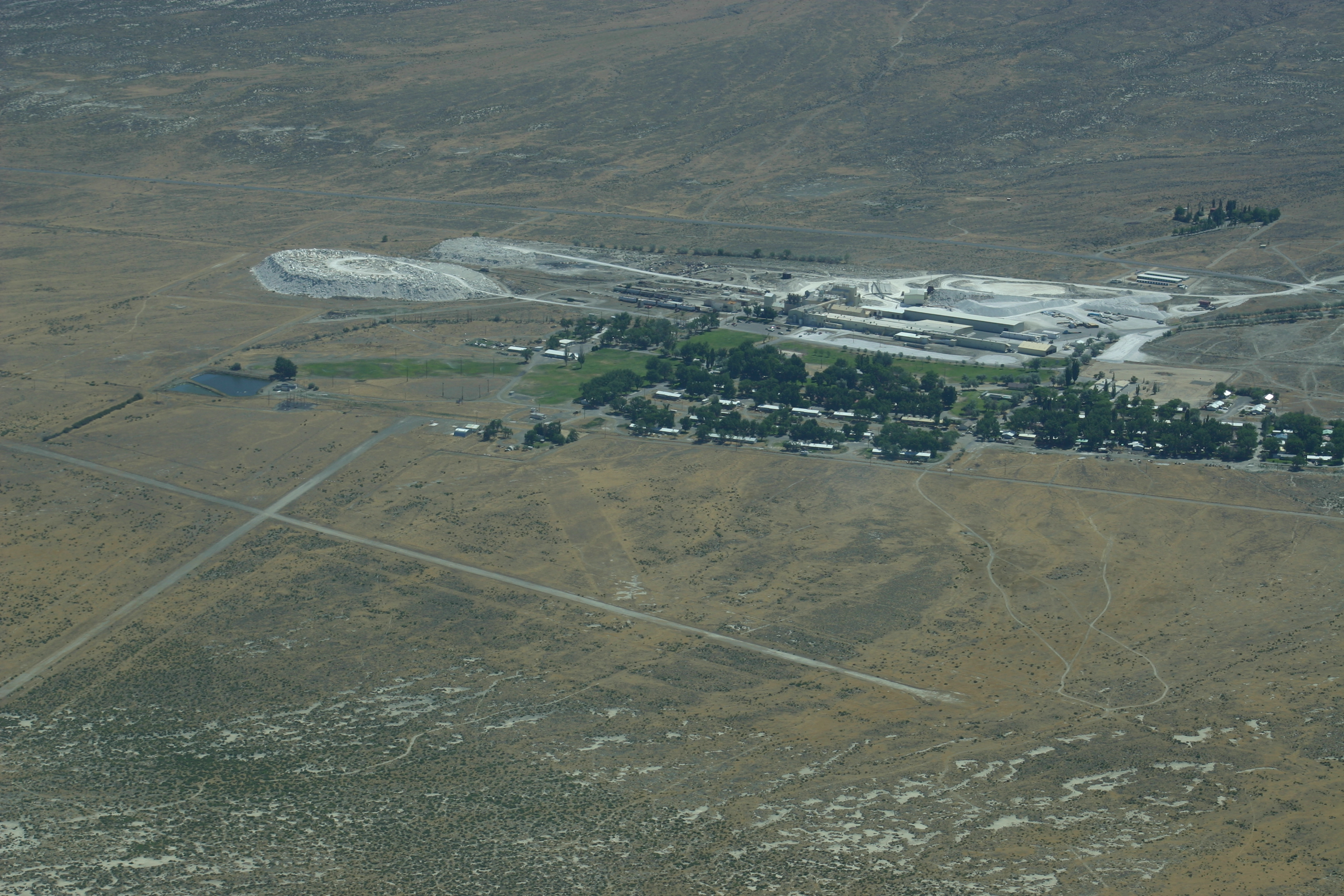
- IATA: none; ICAO: none; FAA LID: 18NV (formerly 1A8)

Summary
- Airport type: Private
- Owner: U.S. Gypsum Company
- Serves: Empire, Nevada
- Elevation AMSL: 3,990 ft (1,220 m)
- Coordinates: 40°34′43″N 119°21′05″W

Map
- Location of airport in Nevada

Runways
Direction	Length		Surface
Direction	ft	m	Surface
7/25	3,170	966	Dirt
18/36	3,770	1,149	Dirt

Statistics (2011)
- Aircraft operations: 150
- Based aircraft: 1
- Source: Federal Aviation Administration

Empire Airport (FAA LID: 18NV (formerly 1A8)) is a private (Prior Permission Required) airport located at the northwest corner of the former town of Empire, in Washoe County, Nevada, United States. It is owned by the US Bureau of Land Management, and leased to U.S. Gypsum Company.

== Facilities and aircraft ==
Empire Airport covers an area of 75 acres (30 ha) at an elevation of 3,990 feet (1,216 m) above mean sea level. It has two runways with dirt surfaces: 7/25 is 3,170 by 48 feet (966 x 15 m) and 18/36 is 3,770 by 42 feet (1,149 x 13 m).

For the 12-month period ending December 30, 2011, the airport had 150 general aviation aircraft operations, an average of 12 per month. At that time there was one single-engine aircraft based at this airport.

== See also ==
- List of airports in Nevada
