= Silver selenite =

Names
- Other names Silver(I) selenite

Identifiers
CAS Number	7784-05-6
3D model (JSmol)	Interactive image
ChemSpider	14668373
ECHA InfoCard	100.029.133
EC Number	232-046-4
PubChem CID	15520661
UNII	2QL3KFA70W
CompTox Dashboard (EPA)	DTXSID40228463
- InChI: InChI=1S/2Ag.H2O3Se/c;;1-4(2)3/h;;(H2,1,2,3)/q2*+1;/p-2 Key: WQIJNCUKAOHNPM-UHFFFAOYSA-L; InChI=1/2Ag.H2O3Se/c;;1-4(2)3/h;;(H2,1,2,3)/q2*+1;/p-2 Key: WQIJNCUKAOHNPM-NUQVWONBAA
- SMILES: [Ag+].[Ag+].[O-][Se]([O-])=O

Properties
Chemical formula	Ag_{2}SeO_{3}
Molar mass	342.69 g/mol
Appearance	crystalline needles
Density	5.930 g/cm^{3}
Melting point	530 °C (986 °F; 803 K)
Boiling point	decomposes above 550 °C (1,022 °F; 823 K)
Solubility in water	slightly soluble
Solubility	soluble in acids

Hazards
Safety data sheet (SDS)	MSDS^{[usurped]}
- Except where otherwise noted, data are given for materials in their standard state (at 25 °C [77 °F], 100 kPa). verify (what is ?) Infobox references

Silver selenite is an inorganic compound of formula Ag_{2}SeO_{3}.

== Production ==
Silver selenite is formed during the recovery of selenium from copper anode slimes when they are subjected to oxidative roasting, causing some silver selenide to be converted to the selenite. It can also be prepared by a precipitation reaction between silver nitrate and sodium selenite:

Another method is the reaction between selenium and silver nitrate:

3 Se + 6 AgNO_{3} + 3 H_{2}O → 2 Ag_{2}Se + Ag_{2}SeO_{3} + 6 HNO_{3}
