= Washoe County Library System =

Washoe County Library System is the public library system of Washoe County, Nevada.

In 2002 it had a bond for new branches and extensive renovations and in a span of several months library usage increased by 17%. The library system did financially well until 2009 with the Great Recession. The county cut 500 county jobs then, and by 2015 there had been a 40% decline in the number of employees and in the library system's budget.

By 2016 the library system was removing thousands of books which were not parts of historical collections and which had not been checked out by patrons in the previous four years.

== Branches ==
- Downtown Reno Library
- Duncan/Traner
  - It is located in northeast Reno. It is named after Glenn Duncan Elementary School and Traner Middle School, which it is adjacent to. It has 3,100 square feet (290 m^{2}) of space.
- Gerlach School and Library - Gerlach
- Incline Village
- North Valleys
- Northwest Reno
- Senior Center
- Sierra View
- South Valleys
- Spanish Springs
- Sparks - Sparks
  - Former building
  - The current Sparks Library has 23,000 square feet (2,100 m^{2}) of space. By 2019 the library started a Drag Queen Story Hour despite opposition from politically conservative groups.
- Verdi

Seven of the libraries have geocaches.
