= Washoe County Library-Sparks Branch =

- Washoe County Library--Sparks Branch
- U.S. National Register of Historic Places
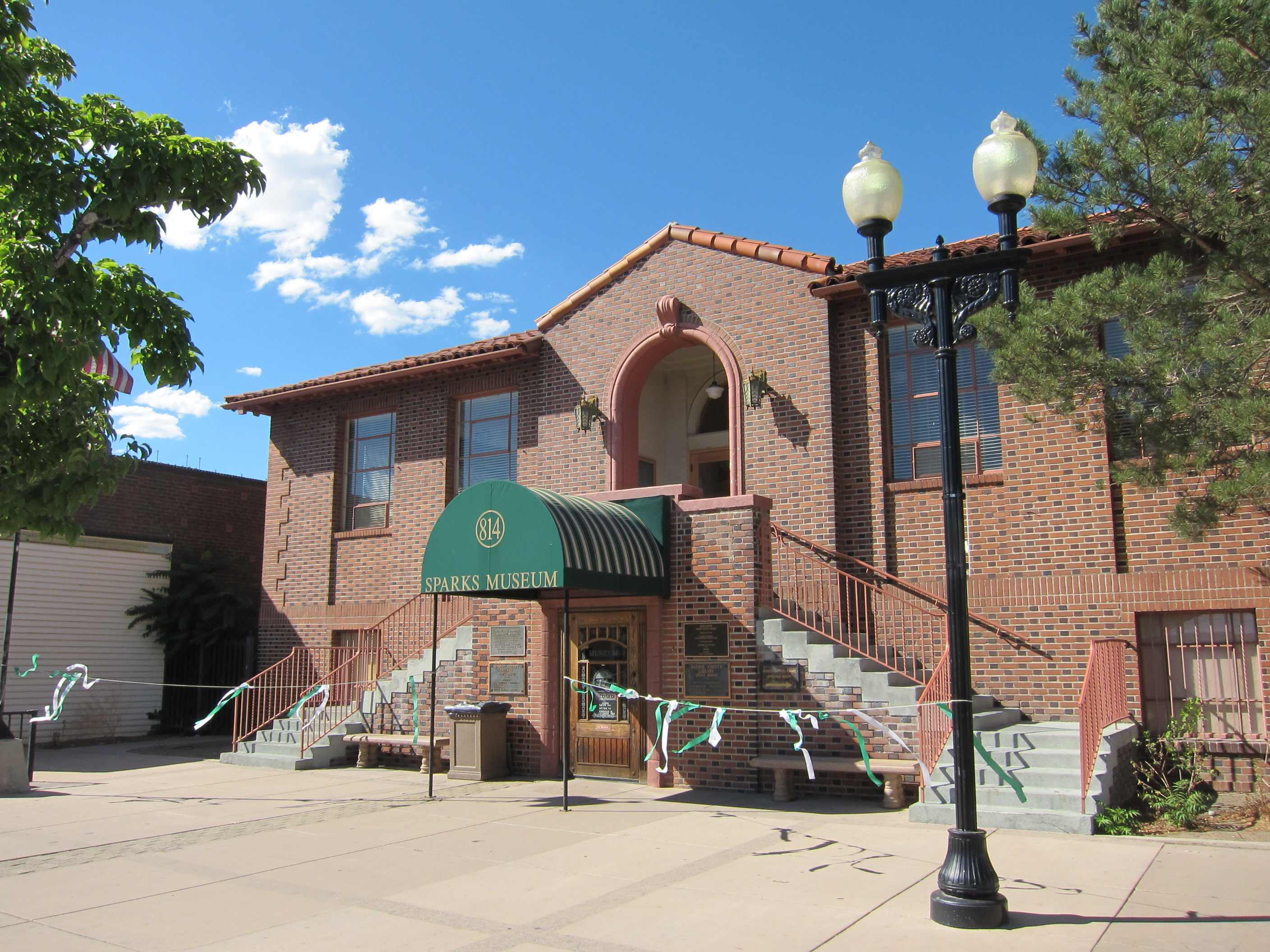

- Location within Nevada Location within the United States
- Location: 814 Victorian St., Sparks, Nevada
- Coordinates: 39°32′7″N 119°45′8″W
- Area: less than one acre
- Built: 1931
- Architect: DeLongchamps, Frederick J.; Rousch & Belz
- Architectural style: Late 19th and 20th Century Revivals, Mediterranean Revival
- MPS: Architecture of Frederick J. DeLongchamps TR
- NRHP reference No.: 92000116
- Added to NRHP: March 9, 1992

The Washoe County Library-Sparks Branch, at a prominent corner location at 814 Victorian St. in Sparks, Nevada, is a historic building that was designed by Nevada architect Frederick J. DeLongchamps and was built in 1931. Also known as Sparks Justice Court, it was listed on the National Register of Historic Places in 1992. It was deemed significant for serving as a unique example of the Mediterranean Revival style in Sparks. It is the oldest surviving government building in Sparks.

It was built as the Sparks Branch of the Washoe County Library System. In 1965 the library was moved to a bigger building and the City of Sparks Justice Court, which had been in the building already, was expanded to the entire building. In 1992 there were plans to make the building into a museum.
