= Mount Limbo =

Mountain in Nevada, United States

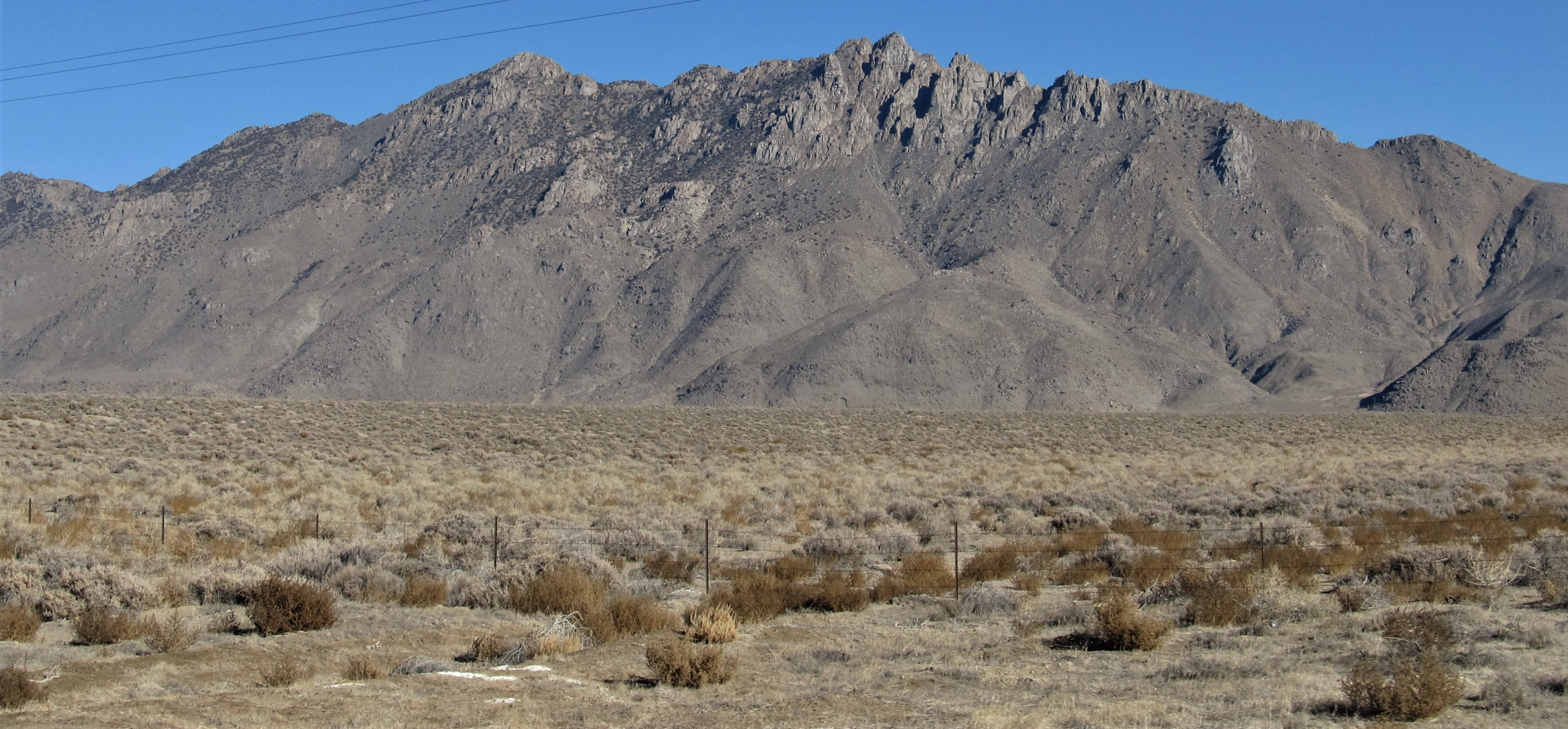
- Mount Limbo (near center), Purgatory Peak (left); Southwest aspect from Highway 447

Highest point
- Elevation: 7,312 ft (2,229 m)
- Prominence: 252 ft (77 m)
- Parent peak: Purgatory Peak (7,417 ft)
- Isolation: 0.61 mi (0.98 km)
- Coordinates: 40°20′23″N 119°16′54″W

Geography
- Location within Nevada Location within the United States
- Country: United States of America
- State: Nevada
- County: Pershing
- Parent range: Selenite Range; Great Basin Ranges
- Topo map: USGS Purgatory Peak

Geology
- Rock age: Cretaceous
- Mountain type: Fault block
- Rock type: Granodiorite

Climbing
- Easiest route: class 3 scrambling

Mount Limbo is a 7,312-foot elevation (2,229 m) summit located in Pershing County, Nevada, United States.

== Description ==
Mount Limbo is the fourth-highest peak of the Selenite Range which is a subset of the Great Basin Ranges. This peak is set in the Mount Limbo Wilderness Study Area which is owned by the Bureau of Land Management. It is situated 0.6 miles (0.97 km) south of line parent Purgatory Peak, 44 miles (71 km) west-northwest of the town of Lovelock, and north of Winnemucca Lake. Topographic relief is significant as the summit rises 3,100 feet (940 meters) above Poito Valley in approximately one mile (1.6 km). This landform's toponym was officially adopted in 1965 by the U.S. Board on Geographic Names.

== Climate ==
Mount Limbo is set in the Great Basin Desert which has hot summers and cold winters. The desert is an example of a cold desert climate as the desert's elevation makes temperatures cooler than lower elevation deserts. Due to the high elevation and aridity, temperatures drop sharply after sunset. Summer nights are comfortably cool. Winter highs are generally above freezing, and winter nights are bitterly cold, with temperatures often dropping well below freezing.

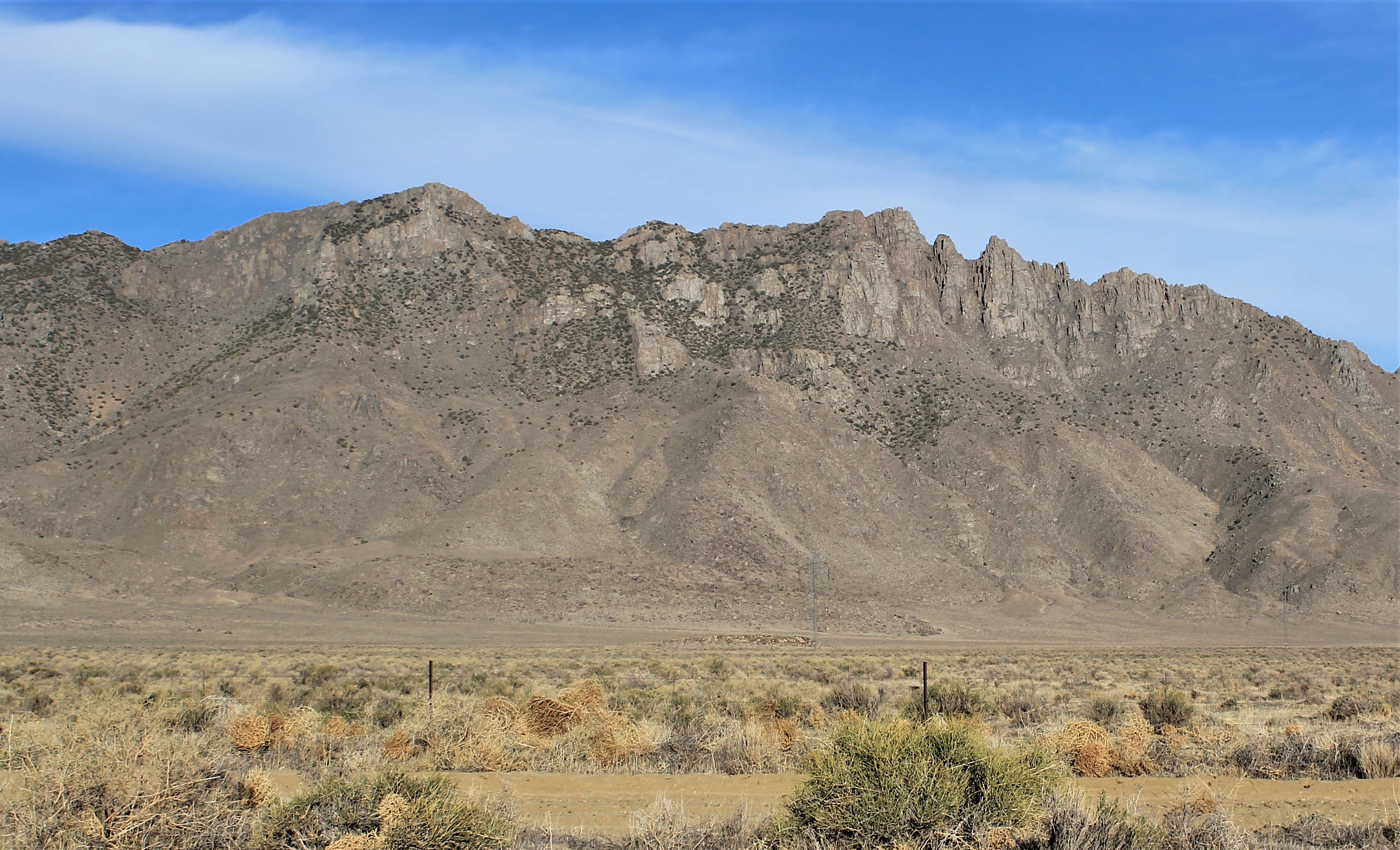
Purgatory Peak (left) and Mt. Limbo (right)

== See also ==
- Great Basin
- Black Rock Desert
