= Gerlach, Nevada =

- Census-designated place
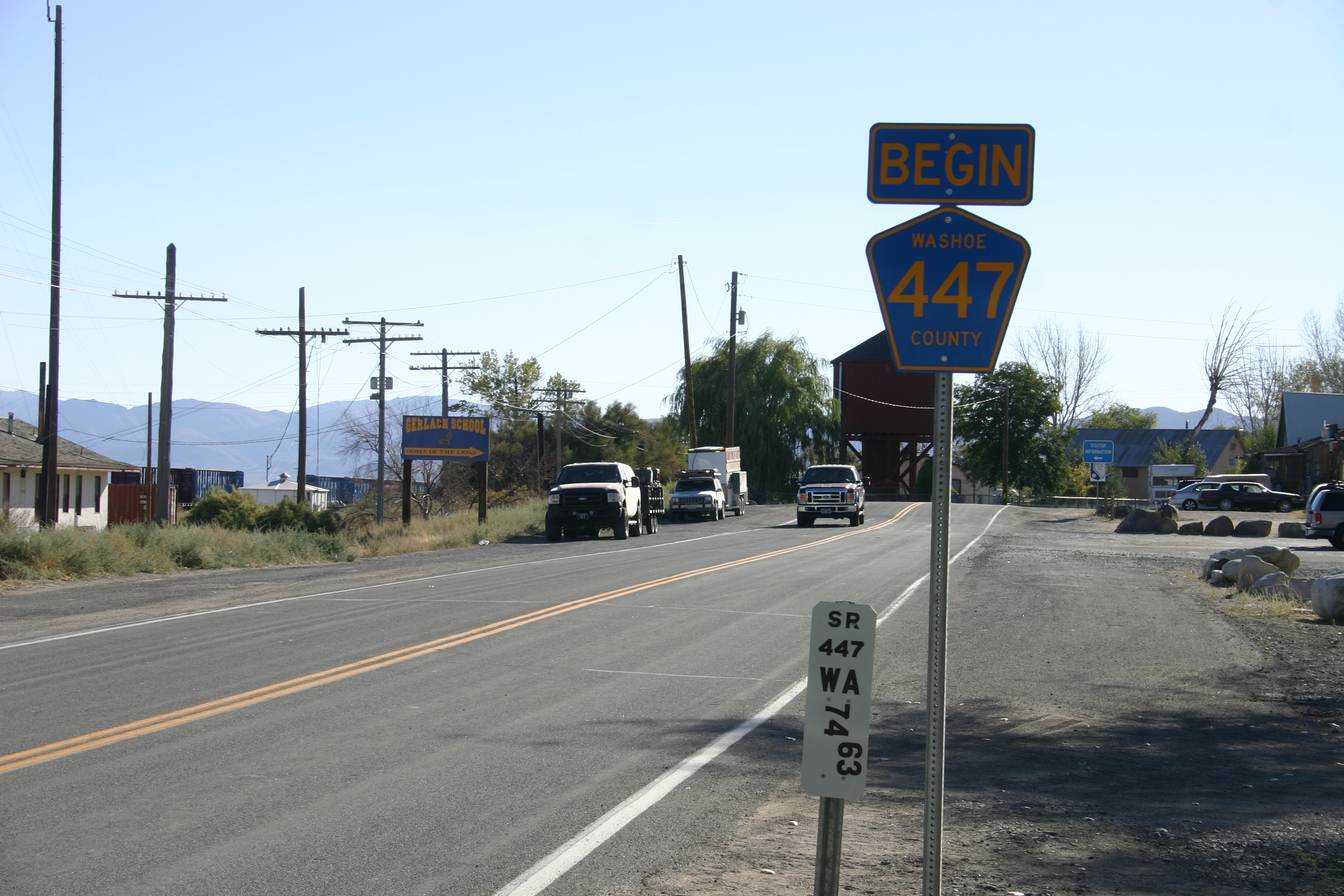

- Location of Gerlach, Nevada

- Location within Nevada Location within the United States
- Coordinates: 40°39′6″N 119°21′19″W
- Country: United States
- State: Nevada

Area
  - Total: 3.12 sq mi (8.09 km^{2})
  - Land: 3.12 sq mi (8.09 km^{2})
  - Water: 0 sq mi (0.00 km^{2})
- Elevation: 3,944 ft (1,202 m)

Population (2020)
  - Total: 130
  - Density: 41.6/sq mi (16.06/km^{2})
- Time zone: UTC−8 (Pacific (PST))
  - Summer (DST): UTC−7 (PDT)
- ZIP code: 89412
- Area code: 775
- FIPS code: 32-27300
- GNIS feature ID: 845471
- Website

Nevada Historical Marker
- Reference no.: 152

Gerlach, Nevada is a census-designated place (CDP) in Washoe County, Nevada, United States. The population was 130 at the 2020 census. It is part of the Reno-Sparks metropolitan area. Prior to 2010, Gerlach was part of the Gerlach–Empire census-designated place. The town of Empire is now a separate CDP. The next nearest town, Nixon, is 60 miles (100 km) to the south on the Pyramid Lake Indian Reservation. The Black Rock Desert and Fly Geyser are located near Gerlach.

== History ==
Gerlach was founded in 1906 during the construction of the Feather River Route of the Western Pacific Railroad. The Gerlach Post Office opened on October 27, 1909.

Gerlach was named for the Gerlach Land and Cattle Company, owned by Louis Gerlach.

In 1997, the town and its homes and bars were used by the British team of the Thrust SSC supersonic car, as they pursued their goal of being the first to go faster than the speed of sound, which was achieved on October 15, 1997. The record still stands today. The Black Rock Saloon in the town kept track of the progress, given at the same time, Craig Breedlove attempted his own pursuit of the sound barrier. In 2017, several members of the former Thrust team revisited Gerlach for a reunion to mark the 20th anniversary.

In 2009, the Space Chair was lofted to near space north of Gerlach.

== Geography ==
According to the United States Census Bureau, the Gerlach CDP has a total area of 3.1 square miles (8.0 km^{2}), all land. Its elevation is 3,944 ft (1,202 m). Gerlach is approximately 100 miles (160 km) north of Reno, Nevada.

== Demographics ==
Historical population
Census	Pop.	Note	%±
2010	206		—
2020	130		−36.9%
U.S. Decennial Census

== Climate ==
Gerlach has a steppe climate (Bsk).

Climate data for Gerlach, Nevada, 1991–2020 normals, extremes 1948–2019
Month	Jan	Feb	Mar	Apr	May	Jun	Jul	Aug	Sep	Oct	Nov	Dec	Year
Record high °F (°C)	67 (19)	70 (21)	83 (28)	91 (33)	99 (37)	104 (40)	112 (44)	106 (41)	106 (41)	98 (37)	76 (24)	64 (18)	112 (44)
Mean maximum °F (°C)	56.4 (13.6)	62.0 (16.7)	71.8 (22.1)	80.7 (27.1)	89.7 (32.1)	97.4 (36.3)	102.0 (38.9)	100.3 (37.9)	94.7 (34.8)	84.9 (29.4)	68.2 (20.1)	56.5 (13.6)	101.9 (38.8)
Mean daily maximum °F (°C)	43.6 (6.4)	50.1 (10.1)	58.5 (14.7)	65.6 (18.7)	74.8 (23.8)	85.0 (29.4)	94.8 (34.9)	93.0 (33.9)	83.9 (28.8)	69.5 (20.8)	53.8 (12.1)	42.7 (5.9)	67.9 (20.0)
Daily mean °F (°C)	33.8 (1.0)	38.9 (3.8)	45.7 (7.6)	51.4 (10.8)	60.4 (15.8)	69.5 (20.8)	78.2 (25.7)	75.9 (24.4)	66.6 (19.2)	53.8 (12.1)	41.1 (5.1)	32.2 (0.1)	54.0 (12.2)
Mean daily minimum °F (°C)	24.1 (−4.4)	27.7 (−2.4)	32.8 (0.4)	37.3 (2.9)	45.9 (7.7)	54.1 (12.3)	61.6 (16.4)	58.9 (14.9)	49.3 (9.6)	38.1 (3.4)	28.4 (−2.0)	21.8 (−5.7)	40.0 (4.4)
Mean minimum °F (°C)	6.8 (−14.0)	12.4 (−10.9)	18.4 (−7.6)	23.6 (−4.7)	31.7 (−0.2)	39.4 (4.1)	49.1 (9.5)	46.7 (8.2)	35.6 (2.0)	23.4 (−4.8)	14.5 (−9.7)	5.3 (−14.8)	0.5 (−17.5)
Record low °F (°C)	−22 (−30)	−13 (−25)	2 (−17)	14 (−10)	24 (−4)	32 (0)	37 (3)	32 (0)	25 (−4)	13 (−11)	−2 (−19)	−30 (−34)	−30 (−34)
Average precipitation inches (mm)	1.07 (27)	0.73 (19)	0.85 (22)	0.61 (15)	1.01 (26)	0.60 (15)	0.29 (7.4)	0.14 (3.6)	0.27 (6.9)	0.54 (14)	0.69 (18)	0.99 (25)	7.79 (198.9)
Average snowfall inches (cm)	3.3 (8.4)	1.4 (3.6)	1.4 (3.6)	0.5 (1.3)	0.0 (0.0)	0.0 (0.0)	0.0 (0.0)	0.0 (0.0)	0.0 (0.0)	0.0 (0.0)	1.5 (3.8)	4.9 (12)	13.0 (33)
Average precipitation days (≥ 0.01 in)	7.3	6.4	6.1	5.1	5.3	3.6	1.8	1.4	2.0	3.9	5.1	6.4	54.4
Average snowy days (≥ 0.1 in)	1.9	1.2	1.0	0.3	0.0	0.0	0.0	0.0	0.0	0.0	0.9	1.9	7.2
Source 1: NOAA
Source 2: National Weather Service (mean maxima and minima 1948–2019)

== Economy ==
The economy of Gerlach focuses on tourism in the nearby Black Rock Desert, and hunting. Gypsum mining was the historic staple of the local economy. Nearby Empire was a company town of the United States Gypsum Corporation (USG) until the plant closed on January 31, 2011, eliminating 95 jobs. In 2016, the town of Empire was purchased by the Empire Mining Company, who have re-opened gypsum mining operations, and have begun to rehabilitate the houses in town.

The other major industries are a Union Pacific switching station in Gerlach and public services of Washoe County, which includes its roads department and a K–12 public school owned by the Washoe County School District; the future of the Gerlach K–12 School is uncertain, as it is estimated after the gypsum plant closed in 2011, only around a dozen children remained in Gerlach. Many of the inhabitants of Gerlach are elderly retirees. Many people in Gerlach also have small private businesses. Many businesses are Internet-based, due to the town's remote Nevada location. Hunters from all over the west travel to Gerlach to hunt a wide variety of game such as chukar, geese, deer, antelope, etc.

Since 1990, Burning Man, a week-long festival attended by as many as 78,850 in 2019, has been held nearby. The event is responsible for around 25% of the yearly sales at the few commercial establishments in the area, which include the closest permanent fuel and grocery stops to the Burning Man event site. As of 2023, the Burning Man Project owned about half the commercial property in Gerlach. The Black Rock Desert is also the site of many other recreational activities throughout the year.

== Government ==
Gerlach previously had a volunteer fire department, but in 2015 the entire department resigned. The county had plans to establish fire services.

== Transportation ==
Primary highway access to Gerlach is provided by State Route 447. It can also be accessed via three former state highways: State Route 34, State Route 48, and State Route 49 (also known as Jungo Road).

Gerlach has an airfield, simply a graded dirt strip, which is no longer usable. It should not be used unless under emergency.

The California Zephyr inter-city rail service was routed through Gerlach from its inception in 1949 until the end of its pre-Amtrak incarnation in 1970, providing direct service from Oakland, California to Chicago.

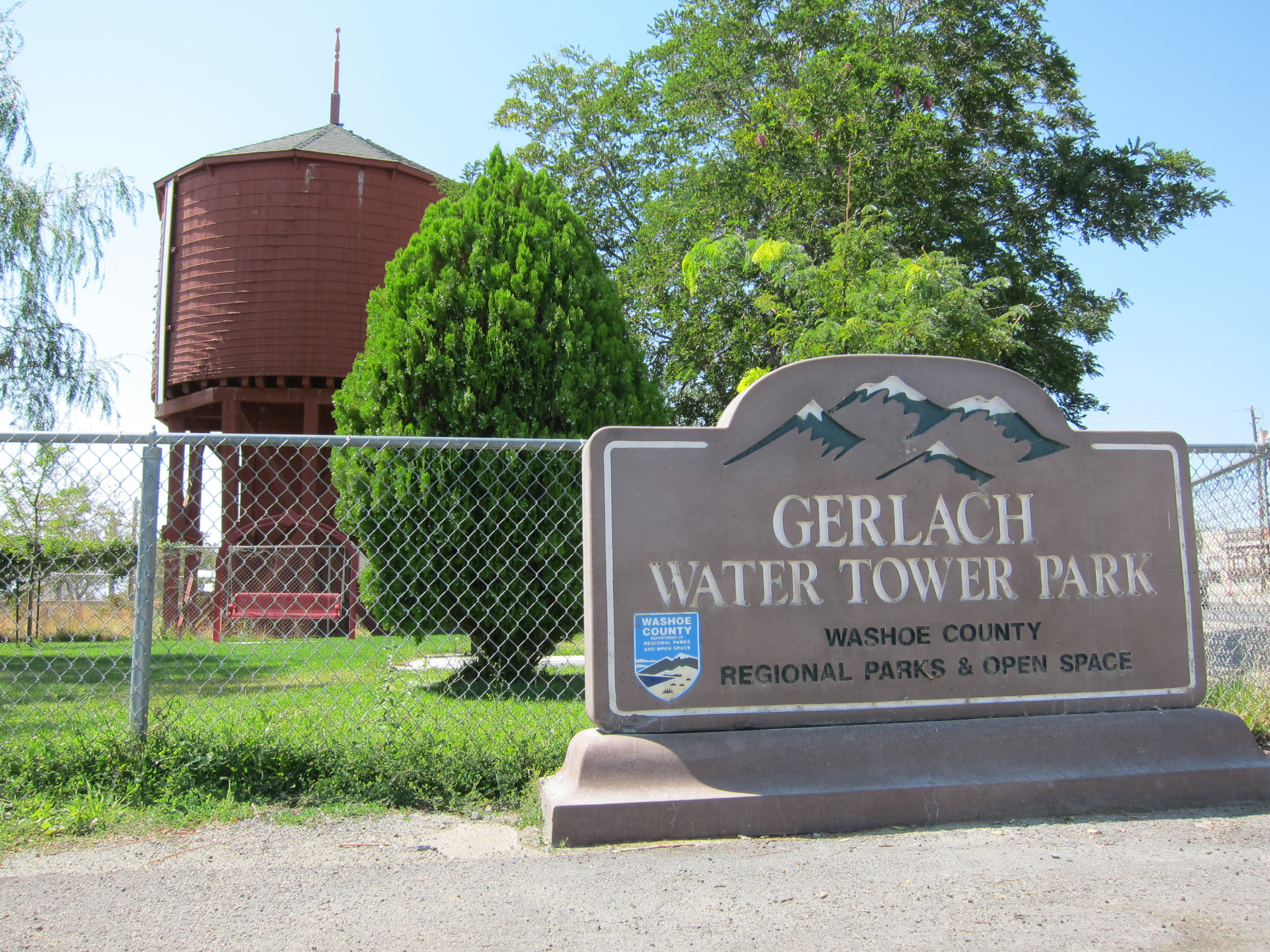
The Gerlach Water Tower is listed on the National Register of Historic Places.

== In popular culture ==
Gerlach was one of the film locations for the film Far From Home (1989). Gerlach was also the site for Gary Cooper's first (credited) film, The Winning of Barbara Worth (1926).

== Media ==
Gerlach has two non-profit community-based radio stations. KFBR 91.5 was run by Friends of Black Rock/High Rock,. In 2022, KFBR was sold to the Burning Man Project for $6000. KLAP 89.5 is run by Open Sky Radio Corp and broadcast from a studio located at 395 Main Street in the old Gerlach Gas Station and Garage Building Office.

== Education ==
Washoe County School District operates Gerlach K-12 School.

Ernest M. Johnson School, initially an elementary school in Empire, moved to the Gerlach High School site in Gerlach in 2001. By 2000, the school's address was already in Gerlach. Johnson became a K-12 school in 2011.

Gerlach High, a school that serves grades 6-12, opened in 1931. In 1955, a new building was made, as the original one got destroyed by a fire in January of that same year.

Gerlach has a public library, a branch of the Washoe County Library System, on the school property.
