= Burning Man Project =

Organisers of the Burning Man festival

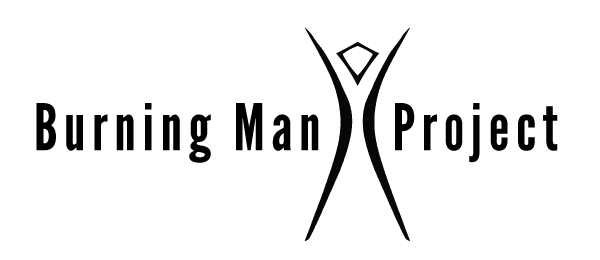
- Predecessor: Black Rock City LLC
- Formation: May 22, 1997
- Headquarters: 660 Alabama Street, San Francisco, CA
- Subsidiaries: Black Rock City LLC; Black Rock Arts Foundation; Future Man LLC
- Website: burningman.org

The Burning Man Project is an American organization that annually plans, manages, and builds Burning Man on the dry lake of the Black Rock Desert in northwestern Nevada. The company coordinates the year-round, behind-the-scenes work needed to build and remove a temporary city of 80,000 people.

Burning Man ticket sales provide a multi million-dollar budget for the organization. These revenues help the organization obtain required permits from the Bureau of Land Management, rent portable toilets and equipment, secure medical, fire, and law enforcement services, and cover other organizational expenses.

== History ==
=== 1986 to 1996 ===
In the first ten years of Burning Man's history, from 1986 to 1996, the annual event was fully anarchical and run largely by the Cacophony Society. Due to an increased need for structure and planning after a tumultuous 1996 year, Burning Man 97 LLC was formed to run next year's event on May 22, 1997.

=== 1997 to 2010 ===
For the first time, the event was run by a legitimate business; rules were implemented, and the Department of Public Works was formed to oversee the task of setting up a city of 10,000 people. Consequently, 1997 was the first year that the city had a planned layout and a map. The intent of the founders was to dissolve and form a new LLC for each event cycle, as evident by the fact that Burning Man 98 LLC was formed on November 24, 1997; this was deemed entirely unsustainable in the business world, however. On February 4, 1999, Black Rock City LLC was formed as an organization to run Burning Man in the long term, then an event of 23,000 people.

On May 8, 2001, The Black Rock Arts Foundation was founded as a separate nonprofit to promote Civic engagement and to help fund Interactive art.

Additionally, Black Rock Solar was formed on May 21, 2008. The organization "promotes environmental stewardship, economic development and energy independence by providing not-for-profit entities, tribes and underserved communities with access to clean energy, education, and job training."

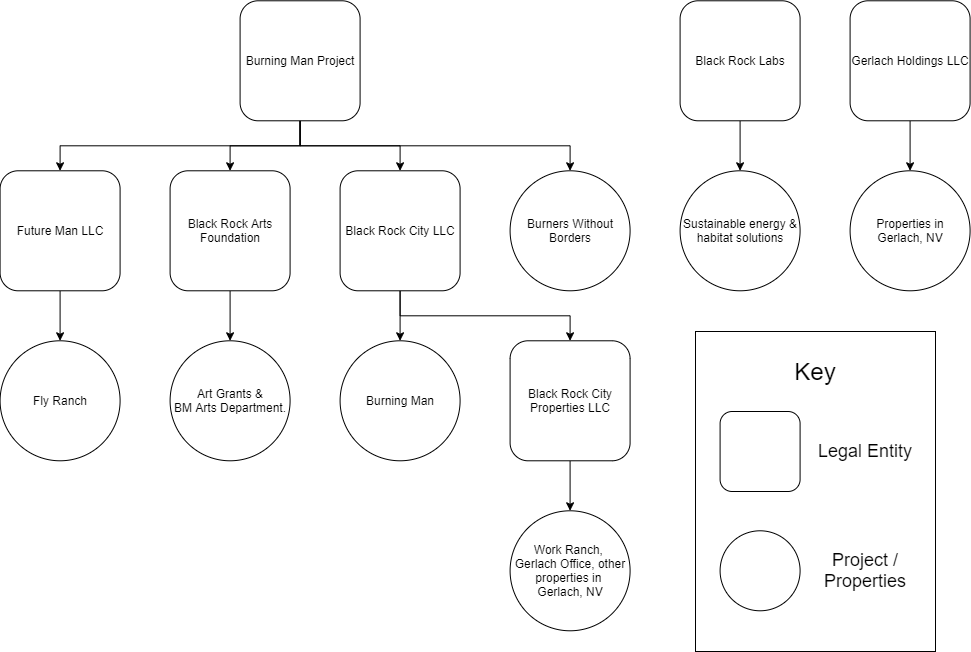
Current Structure of the Burning Man Project

Decommodification LLC was formed on November 23, 2010 to prepare for the transition to a nonprofit that would begin the following year.

=== 2011 to 2013 ===
On June 2, 2011, Burning Man Project was formed as a California Nonprofit Corporation on June 2, 2011. It was approved as an IRS 501(c)(3) organization on April 18, 2012 (EIN 45-2638273). The formation and reorganization was contested by some of the LLC board members, but it carried through.

In the middle of the restructuring, the nonprofit Burners Without Borders was formed on August 21, 2012. They describe themselves as an organization "whose goal is to unlock the creativity of local communities to solve problems that bring about meaningful change." The following year, two LLCs were formed to hold the various property assets of the Burning Man Project. Black Rock City Properties LLC was formed on November 21, 2013, and Gerlach Holdings LLC was formed shortly after on December 19, 2013. Together they hold properties such as the Gerlach Office and the Work Ranch.

On December 27, 2013, Black Rock City LLC was finally made a subsidiary of the new Burning Man Project.

=== 2014 to present ===
In July 2014, the Black Rock Arts Foundation was made a subsidiary of the Burning Man Project.

On September 6, 2017, Future Man LLC was established to hold the Fly Ranch property after the Burning Man Project acquired it in 2016.

== See also ==
- Fly Geyser
