= Empire, Nevada =

- Unincorporated community Census-designated place
- Location within Nevada Location within the United States
- Coordinates: 40°34′32″N 119°20′28″W
- Country: United States
- State: Nevada

Area
  - Total: 5.14 sq mi (13.30 km^{2})
  - Land: 5.14 sq mi (13.30 km^{2})
  - Water: 0 sq mi (0.00 km^{2})
- Elevation: 4,036 ft (1,230 m)

Population (2020)
  - Total: 47
  - Density: 9.2/sq mi (3.54/km^{2})
- Time zone: UTC-8 (Pacific (PST))
  - Summer (DST): UTC-7 (PDT)
- ZIP codes: 89405
- Area code: 775
- FIPS code: 32-23700
- GNIS feature ID: 2583921

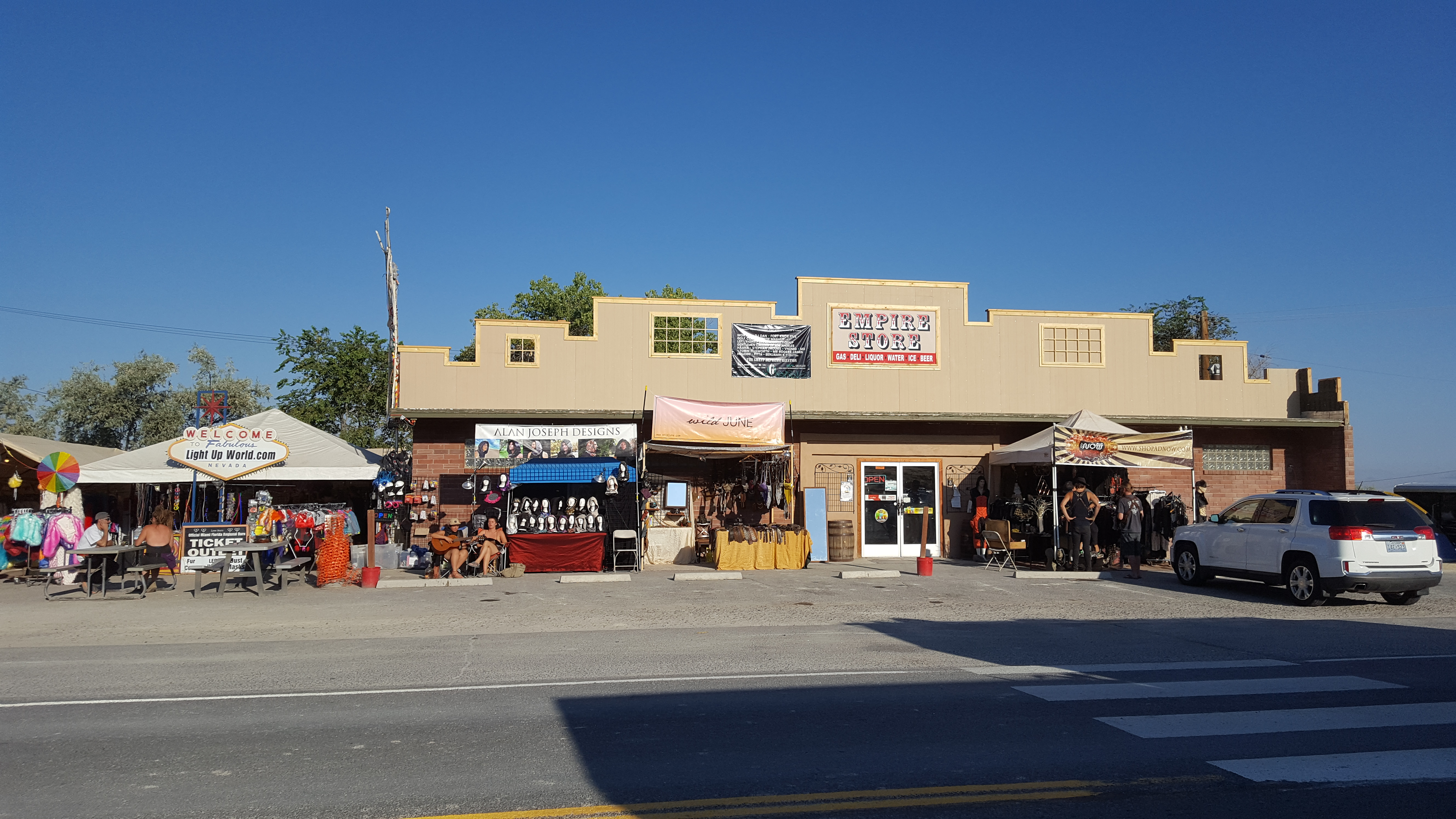
Downtown Empire

Empire is an unincorporated community and census-designated place (CDP) in Washoe County, Nevada, United States, with a population estimated at 65 (2021). Prior to the 2010 census it was part of the Gerlach–Empire census-designated place, it is now part of the Reno-Sparks metropolitan area. The nearest town, Nixon, is 60 miles (97 km) to the south on a reservation owned by the Pyramid Lake Paiute Tribe.

For 63 years, from 1948 to 2011, Empire was a company town of the US Gypsum Corporation, a manufacturer of gypsum-based construction sheetrock, and once had a population of more than 750 people. US Gypsum closed the mine and the town in 2011; the mine and town were bought in 2016 by the Empire Mining Company (EMC), a manufacturer of gypsum based agricultural and construction additives. In 2016, the town again became a company town under the new auspices of EMC. Since that date, both the town and the mine have been partially reopened by the new owners.

== History ==
In 1907, Alex Ranson discovered gypsum near what later became Empire. In late 1909, Alex Ranson, Nick Curnow, E. H. Cowles and James Raser filed a patent for a selenite placer mining claim. In 1911, the mine was sold to unnamed buyers, rumored to be the plaster or gypsum trust from the eastern U.S. The sale was for between $50,000 (equivalent to $1,730,000 in 2025) and $100,000 (equivalent to $3,460,000 in 2025). In 1922, the Pacific Portland Cement company started construction of a mill at what is now known as Empire. In 1924, the Pacific Portland Cement company completed the move of their mill to the current location of Empire from a location near Mound House, Nevada near what was then known as Empire and the Carson River mills. The company called the new plant Empire. U.S. Gypsum bought the town in 1948. Empire reached a maximum population of 750 in the early 1960s.

Amid a slump in the construction industry, the gypsum plant in Empire closed its doors on January 31, 2011, eliminating 95 jobs. Residents with children were allowed to continue inhabiting their company homes through June 20, 2011, the end of the school year. After that date, Empire had empty homes and a large shuttered plant that made it seem almost like a ghost town. The ZIP Code, 89405, was also discontinued. During the years that the mill and town were both closed (2011–2016), U.S. Gypsum first erected a large fence around the entire town and plant complex; it then retained two employees to patrol and maintain the property. It also brought two llamas onto the property to keep the grass trimmed.

In mid-2016, U.S. Gypsum sold the town and the mine to the Empire Mining Company, thus workers began to move back into the town to work under the new mine owners. Since 2016, both the mine and the town have been partially reopened by the new owners of the mine, with a total population of 65 (2021).

== Geography ==
According to the United States Census Bureau, the Empire CDP has a total area of 5.1 square miles (13.3 km^{2}), all land. Its elevation is 4,040 feet (1,230 m) above sea level.

=== Climate ===
Climate data for Empire, Nevada (Elevation 3,980ft)
Month	Jan	Feb	Mar	Apr	May	Jun	Jul	Aug	Sep	Oct	Nov	Dec	Year
Record high °F (°C)	64 (18)	68 (20)	75 (24)	82 (28)	97 (36)	103 (39)	102 (39)	102 (39)	104 (40)	89 (32)	74 (23)	64 (18)	104 (40)
Mean daily maximum °F (°C)	43.1 (6.2)	48.2 (9.0)	54.6 (12.6)	64.3 (17.9)	74.4 (23.6)	83.7 (28.7)	92.7 (33.7)	90.4 (32.4)	85.5 (29.7)	70.2 (21.2)	54.1 (12.3)	44.1 (6.7)	67.1 (19.5)
Mean daily minimum °F (°C)	21.5 (−5.8)	24.8 (−4.0)	29.2 (−1.6)	35.7 (2.1)	43.3 (6.3)	50.2 (10.1)	57.6 (14.2)	54.0 (12.2)	48.0 (8.9)	37.4 (3.0)	26.7 (−2.9)	22.1 (−5.5)	37.5 (3.1)
Record low °F (°C)	−3 (−19)	−1 (−18)	12 (−11)	20 (−7)	23 (−5)	30 (−1)	37 (3)	41 (5)	32 (0)	16 (−9)	7 (−14)	−6 (−21)	−6 (−21)
Average precipitation inches (mm)	0.96 (24)	0.52 (13)	0.64 (16)	0.61 (15)	0.74 (19)	0.54 (14)	0.14 (3.6)	0.12 (3.0)	0.20 (5.1)	0.62 (16)	0.35 (8.9)	1.12 (28)	6.56 (167)
Average snowfall inches (cm)	2.4 (6.1)	1.8 (4.6)	1.1 (2.8)	0.1 (0.25)	0.1 (0.25)	0 (0)	0 (0)	0 (0)	0 (0)	0 (0)	0 (0)	1.6 (4.1)	7.0 (18)
Source: The Western Regional Climate Center

== Demographics ==
Historical population
Census	Pop.	Note	%±
2010	217		—
2020	47		−78.3%
U.S. Decennial Census

== Economy ==
Gypsum mining is the staple of Empire's economy. After the recent reopening of the town, Empire has returned to being a classic company town, though smaller than before. Once again, all residents of Empire are associated with the mining operations of the town. Until its temporary closure in 2011, the Empire gypsum mine was one of the longest continually operating mines in the U.S., operating for 88 years from 1923 to 2011. While many mines were shut down during World War II as resources were diverted to the war effort, gypsum was determined to be an "essential" resource and the mine was never closed during that period.

During its heyday under U.S. Gypsum, the town had a church, a public pool, a nine-hole golf course, an airport, and a post office. There was also a day-care facility for the employees of Empire, and a convenience store with a gas station, the only store for more than 50 miles (80 km). When EMC partially reopened the town in 2016, the store and gas station were transferred to new management. The Catholic Church of Empire also holds services on a monthly basis.

The economy of Empire includes serving tourists heading to the nearby Black Rock Desert and hunting. Since 1991, Burning Man, a week-long experimental festival with 78,850 participants (as of 2017), has been held nearby. The event is responsible for around 20% of the sales at the few commercial establishments in the area, which include the closest permanent fuel and grocery stops to the event site. The Black Rock Desert is also the site of many other recreational activities throughout the year. After the closure of the plant in 2011, the grocery store remained the only source of provisions within 100 miles (160 km) of the Black Rock Desert.

== Transportation ==
Primary highway access to Empire is provided by State Route 447.

Empire Airport is a dirt airfield suitable only for light planes.

== Education ==
Washoe County School District is the area school district. Gerlach K-12 School is the local school. It includes a branch of the Washoe County Library System.

Ernest M. Johnson Elementary School in Empire opened in 1958. Circa 2000, it had 62 students. By 2000, the school's address was already in Gerlach. The school moved to an addition at the Gerlach High School site in Gerlach in 2001. In 2011, Gerlach High was converted into the Johnson Elementary School for K-12.

== In popular culture ==
The award-winning 2020 film Nomadland, based loosely on a true story, was partly filmed in Empire, and carefully documents some of the difficulties and adventures faced by a former Empire resident, Fern, after the closure of the town's gypsum plant. The main character is played by Frances McDormand. Fern was also a former employee at the town's Gypsum mill. Due to the plant closure, Fern, now age 62, is forced to leave town, and she starts a nomadic lifestyle, living out of her van and taking on odd jobs along the way. The film is set in 2011 and 2012, and its script intentionally omits any reference to the 2016 partial re-opening of the town, ending the film's story line apparently sometime before the 2016 re-opening.
