= Black Rock Desert =

Northwest Nevada dry lake

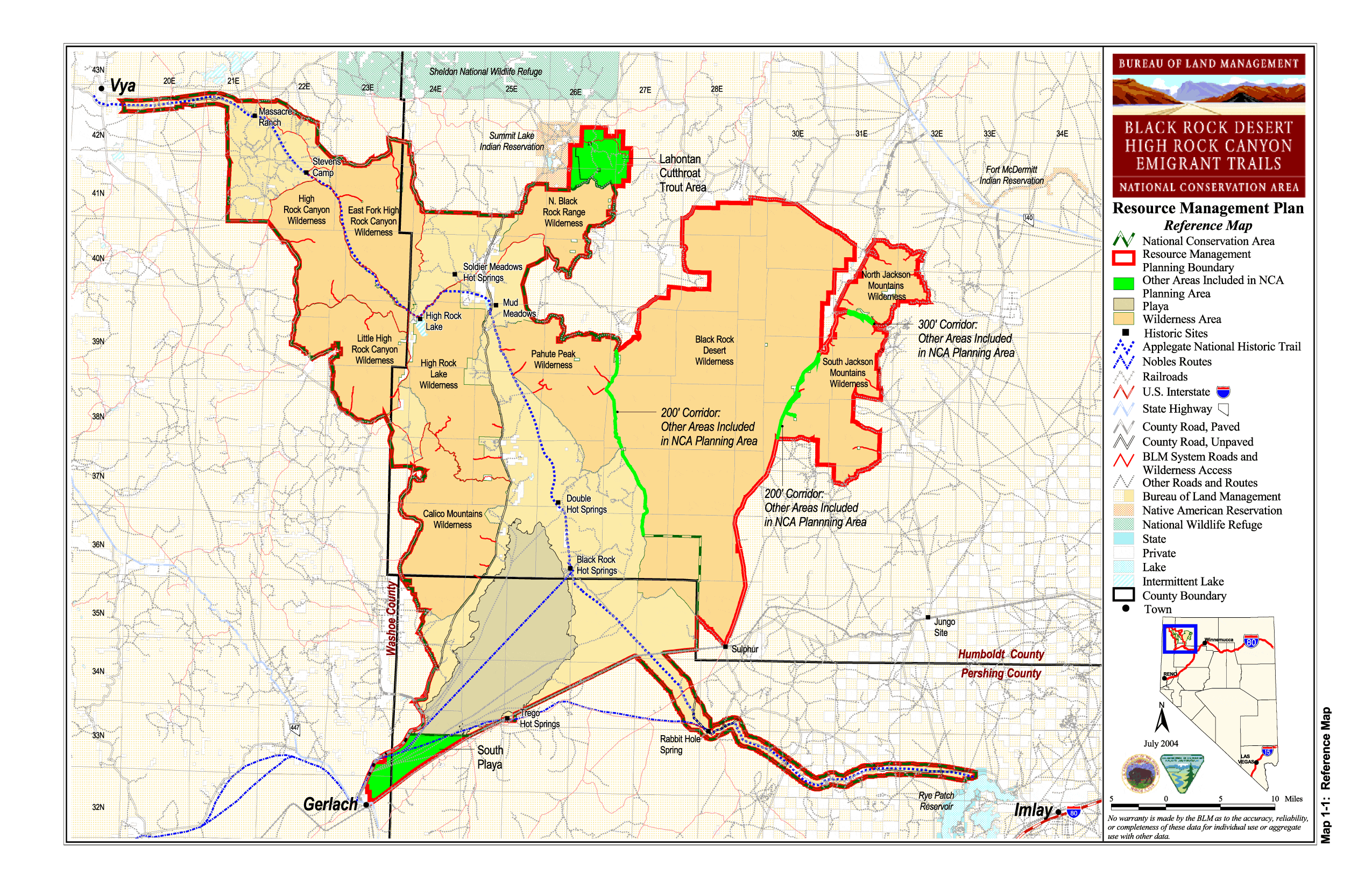
- Length: 100 mi (160 km)
- Area: 1,000 mi^{2} (2,600 km^{2})

Geography
- Country: United States
- State: Nevada
- County: Humboldt; Pershing; Washoe
- Population center: Gerlach, Nevada
- Coordinates: 40°52′59″N 119°03′50″W
- River: Quinn River

Location
- Interactive map of Black Rock Desert

The Black Rock Desert is a semi-arid region (in the Great Basin shrub steppe ecoregion) of lava beds and playa, or alkali flats, situated in the Black Rock Desert–High Rock Canyon Emigrant Trails National Conservation Area, a silt playa 100 miles (160 km) north of Reno, Nevada, that encompasses more than 300,000 acres (120,000 ha) of land and contains more than 120 miles (200 km) of historic trails. It is in the northern Nevada section of the Great Basin with a lakebed that is a dry remnant of Pleistocene Lake Lahontan.

The Great Basin, named for the geography in which water is unable to flow out and remains in the basin, is a rugged land serrated by hundreds of mountain ranges, dried by wind and sun, with spectacular skies and scenic landscapes. The average annual precipitation (in the years 1971–2000) at Gerlach (in the extreme south-west of the desert) is 7.90 inches (200 mm).

The region is notable for its paleogeologic features, as an area of 19th-century Emigrant Trails to California, as a venue for rocketry, and as an alternative to the Bonneville Salt Flats in northwestern Utah for setting land speed records (Mach 1.02 in 1997). It is also the location for the annual Burning Man event.

The Black Rock Desert is part of the National Conservation Area (NCA), a unit of the Bureau of Land Management (BLM) National Landscape Conservation System (NLCS). The NCA is located in northwest Nevada and was established by legislation in 2000. It is a unique combination of the desert playa, narrow canyons, and mountainous areas.

Humans have been in Black Rock Desert since approximately 10,000 B.P. Around 1300 CE, the area was settled by the Paiute people. The Desert's namesake large, black rock formation was used as a landmark by the Paiute and later emigrants crossing the area. The landmark is a conical outcrop composed of interbedded Permian marine limestone and volcanic rocks. At its base is a large hot spring and grassy meadow, which was an important place for those crossing the desert headed for California and Oregon. In 1843, John Frémont and his party were the first white men to cross the desert, and his trail was used by over half of the 22,000 gold seekers headed to California after 1849. In 1867, Hardin City, a short-lived silver mill town, was established (now a ghost town).

== Geography ==
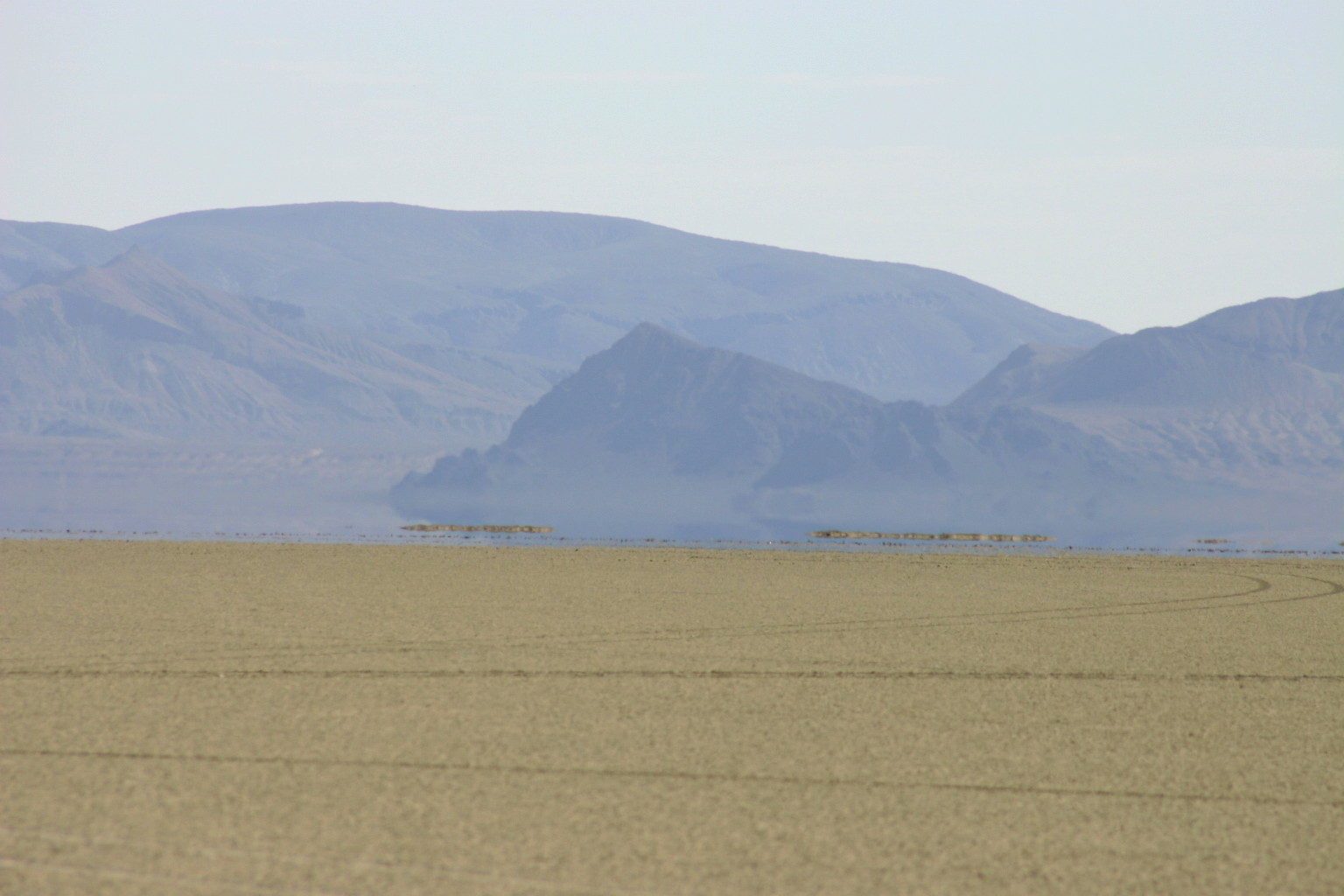
Black Rock Point with mirage

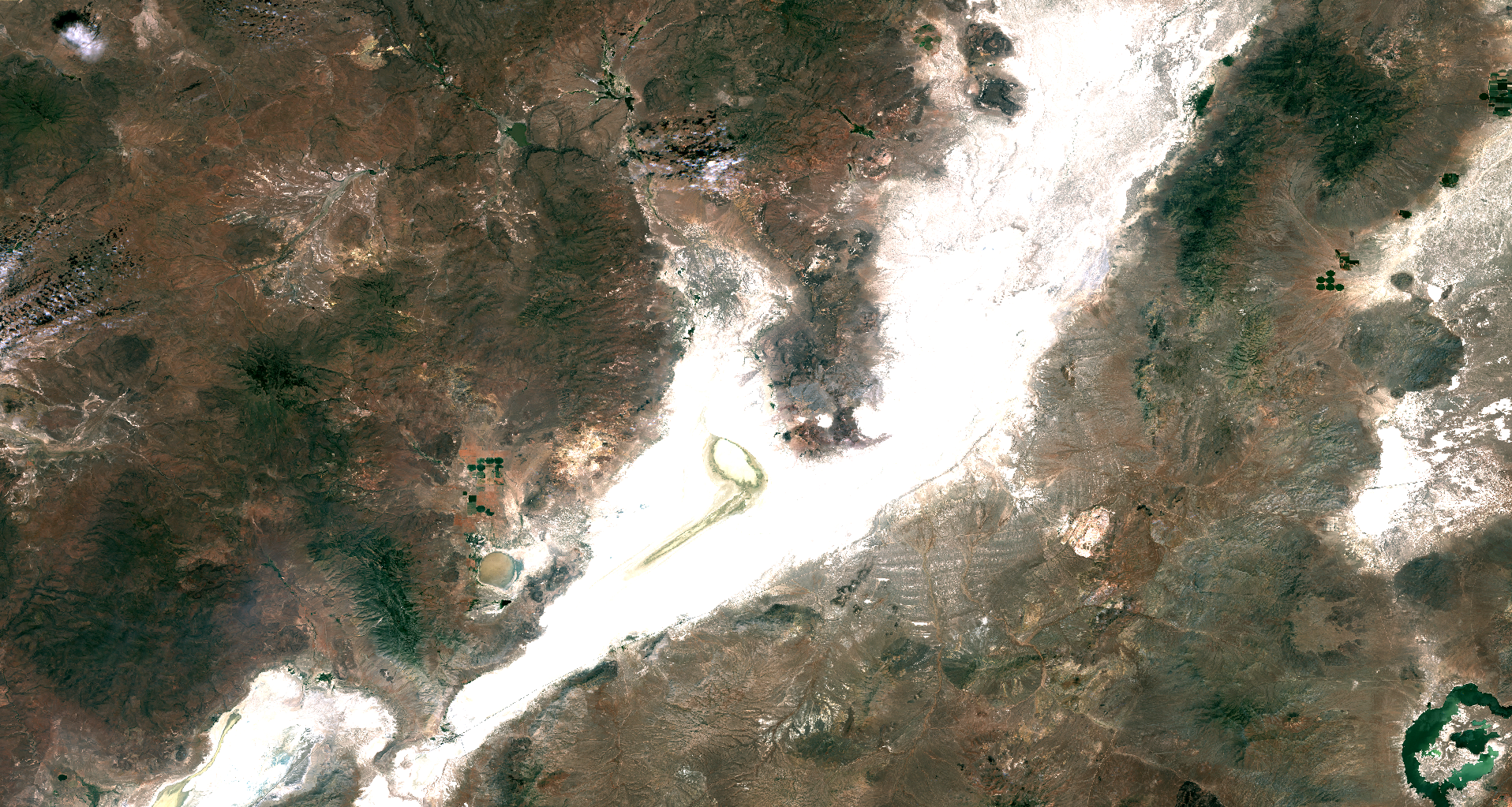
Black Rock Desert, Nevada, July 16, 2017, Sentinel-2 true-color satellite image, scale 1:190,000.

The Black Rock Desert region is in northwestern Nevada and the northwestern Great Basin. The playa extends for approximately 100 mi (160 km) northeast from the towns of Gerlach and Empire, between the Jackson Mountains to the east and the Calico Hills to the west.

The Black Rock Desert is separated into two arms by the Black Rock Range. It lies at an elevation of 3,907 ft (1,191 m) and has an area of about 1,000 sq mi (2,600 km^{2}). There are several possible definitions of the extent of the Black Rock Desert. Often, people refer only to the playa surface. Sometimes, terrain which can be seen from the playa is included. The widest definition of the Black Rock Desert region is the watershed of the basin that drains into the playa.

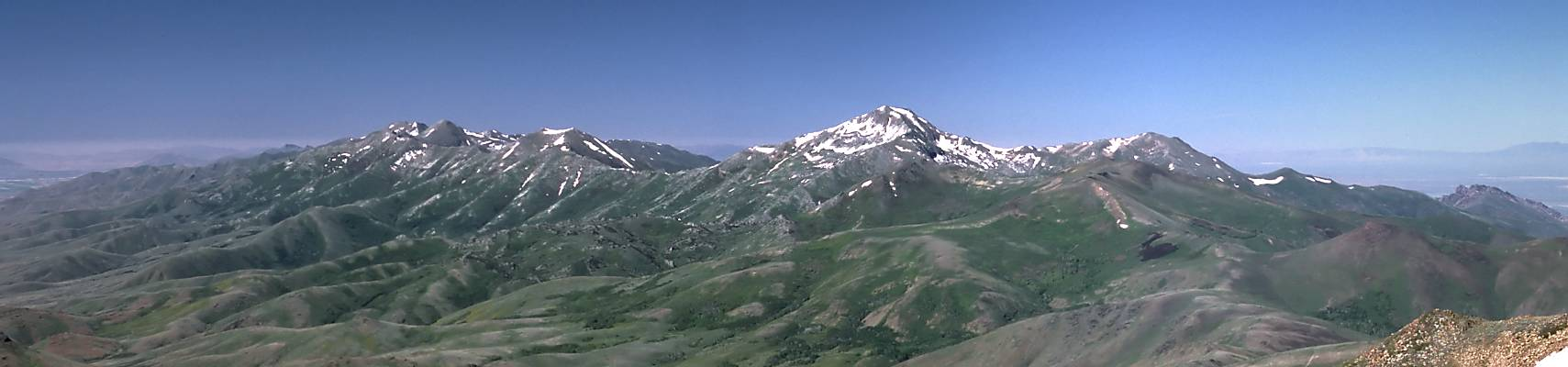
The southern section of the Santa Rosa Range

The intermittent Quinn River is the largest river in the region, starting in the Santa Rosa Range and ending in the Quinn River Sink on the playa south of the Black Rock Range. The desert's watershed covers 11,600 sq mi (30,000 km^{2}), including the Upper and Lower Quinn River, Smoke Creek Desert, Massacre Lake, and Thousand Creek/Virgin Valley watersheds of northwestern Nevada as well as small parts across the borders of California and Oregon.

If the playa is wet for a month or so, then the shallow waters teem with fairy shrimp, or anostraca born of eggs that lie dormant in the silt crust for long periods of time—sometimes for many years. The edges of the playa and the Quinn River Sink stay wet longer than the rest of the playa, which concentrates the fairy shrimp and migratory birds in those areas.

More than 250 species of neo-tropical migrant birds and many other water birds stop in Black Rock–High Rock Country for varying lengths of time. When wet, especially in spring, the playa is a favorite place for these winged visitors to rest and feed.

When it rains, the playa can become extremely sticky, bogging down four-wheel-drive vehicles. Some areas of the Black Rock are environmentally sensitive and closed to all vehicles.

Nevada's Humboldt, Pershing, and Washoe Counties intersect in the Black Rock Desert.

=== Mountain ranges ===
The following mountain ranges are within or border the Black Rock Desert region.

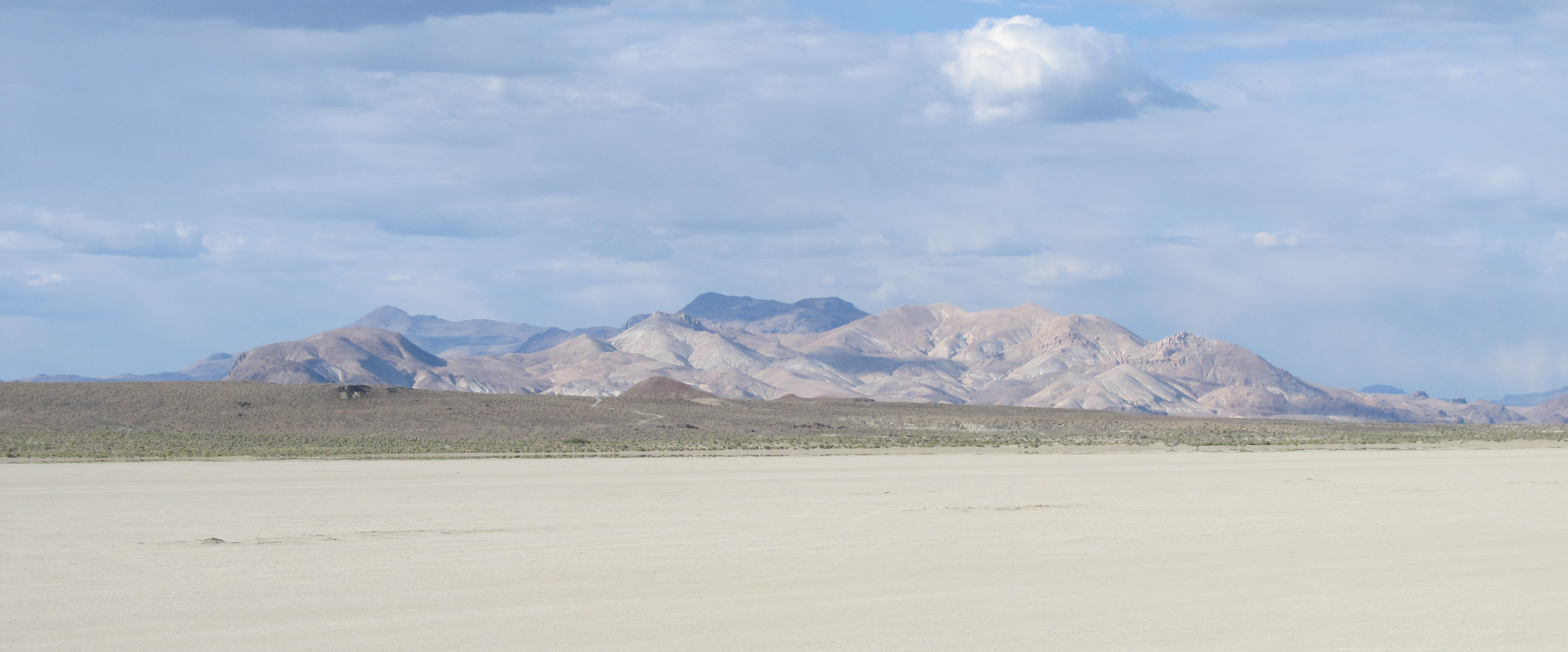
Calico Hills, Humboldt County, Nevada

- Antelope Range
- Badger Mountains
- Black Rock Range
- Calico Hills
- Division Range
- Fox Range
- Granite Range
- Hannan Range
- High Rock Canyon Hills
- Hog Ranch Mountains
- Jackson Mountains
- Kamma Mountains
- Little High Rock Mountains
- Massacre Range
- Montana Mountains
- Pine Forest Range
- Poker Brown Mountains
- Selenite Range
- Sentinel Hills
- Seven Troughs Range
- Sheephead Mountains
- Smoke Creek Mountains
- Yellow Hills

=== Geologic features ===
The desert has numerous volcanic and geothermal features of the northwest Nevada volcanic region, including two Black Rock Points (west and east) at the southern end of the Black Rock Range and which have dark Permian volcanic rocks similar to another Permian black diabase dike formation in Nevada.

The portion of the Lake Lahontan lakebed in the Black Rock Desert is generally flat with Lahontan salt shrub vegetation, widely scattered hot springs, and a playa. In areas of the lakebed along mountains, rain shadow results in desert precipitation levels.

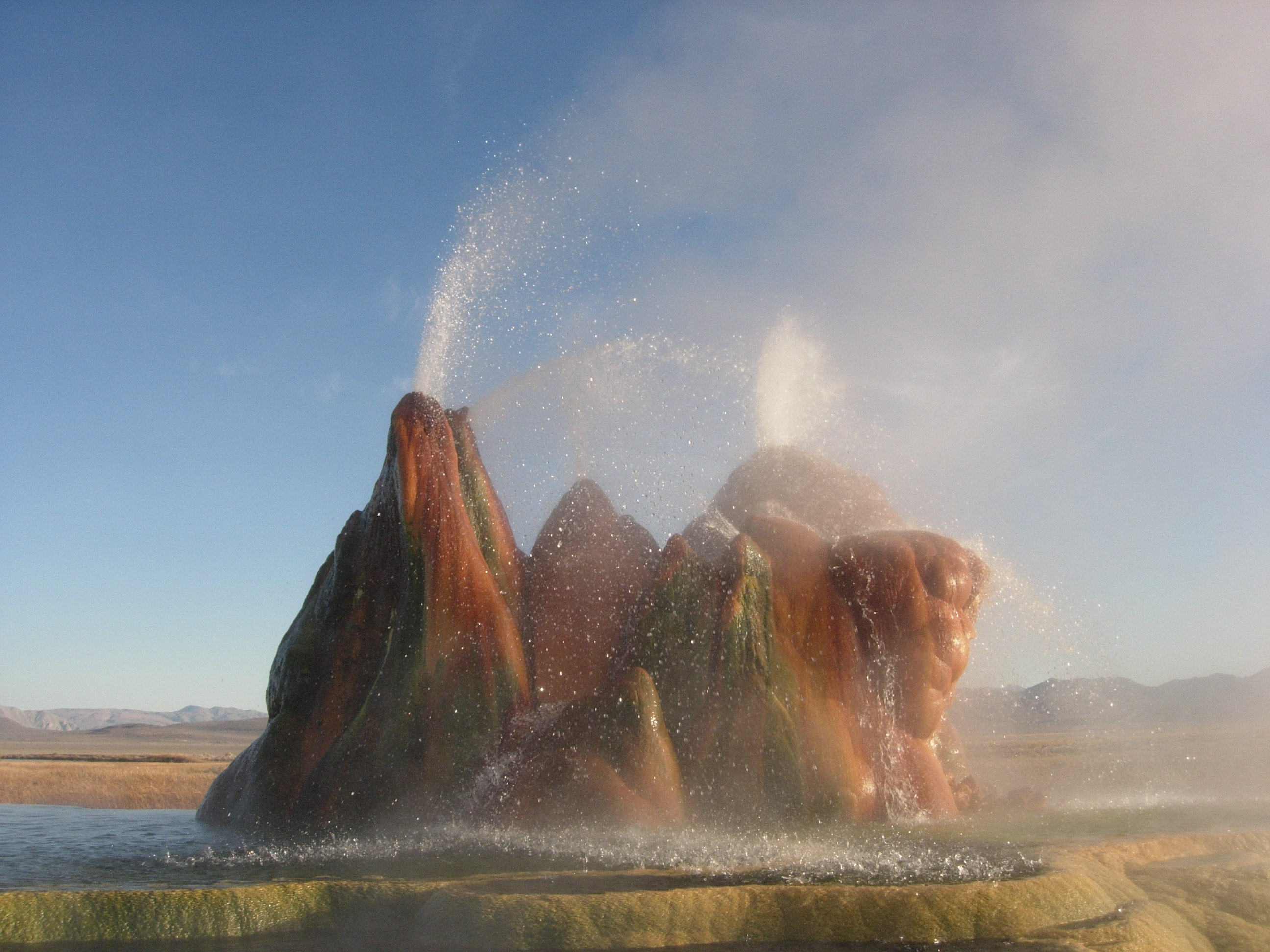
The continuous Fly Geyser of Fly Ranch is on private land and began in 1916, when water well drilling accidentally penetrated a geothermal source.

The playa of the Black Rock Desert lakebed is ~200 sq mi (520 km^{2}) within an area bounded by the Calico Mountains Wilderness (north), Gerlach (west), the Applegate National Historic Trail (northeast), and the Union Pacific Railroad (south). The "South Playa" (~30 sq mi, with ~13 sq mi (34 km^{2}) in Washoe County) is between Gerlach and the southwest boundary of the National Conservation Area (NCA), while the northeast NCA portion of the playa (including ~25 sq mi (65 km^{2}) in Humboldt County) is between the NCA boundary and the Applegate National Historic Trail. A Nobles route between Gerlach and Black Rock Hot Springs extends through the length of the playa. The playa's Quinn River Sink of ~3 sq mi (7.8 km^{2}) is where the Quinn River discharges/evaporates ~2.75 mi (4.43 km) south-southwest of Black Rock Hot Springs.

=== Mining ===
Prospecting and mining have occurred in the Black Rock region since the mid-19th century. US Gypsum Corporation operated a gypsum mine and drywall manufacturing plant in Empire, which employed 107 people and produced 266,300 tons of gypsum in 2008.

Allied Nevada Gold Corporation re-opened the Hycroft Gold Mine in 2008 after acquiring it from Vista Gold Corp. Hycroft is an open-pit mining operation in the Kamma Mountains near Sulphur on the east side of the Black Rock Desert. An opal mine is at the base of the Calico Hills on the west side of the desert.

=== Paleontology ===
Bones of the mammoths that roamed the area around 20,000 BCE have been recovered. In 1979, a fossilized Columbian mammoth was found. Copies of the bones are now exhibited at the Nevada State Museum, Carson City.

== Land speed records ==
The flatness of the Black Rock Desert's lakebed surface has led to the area's use as a proving ground for experimental land vehicles. It was the site of two successful attempts on the world land speed record:

- In 1983, Richard Noble drove the jet-powered Thrust2 car to a new record of 634.015 mph (1,020.348 km/h). Noble also headed up the team that beat the Thrust 2 record.
- In 1997, ThrustSSC, driven by Andy Green, became the world's first, and as of 2026 only, supersonic car, reaching 763.035 mph (1,227.986 km/h).

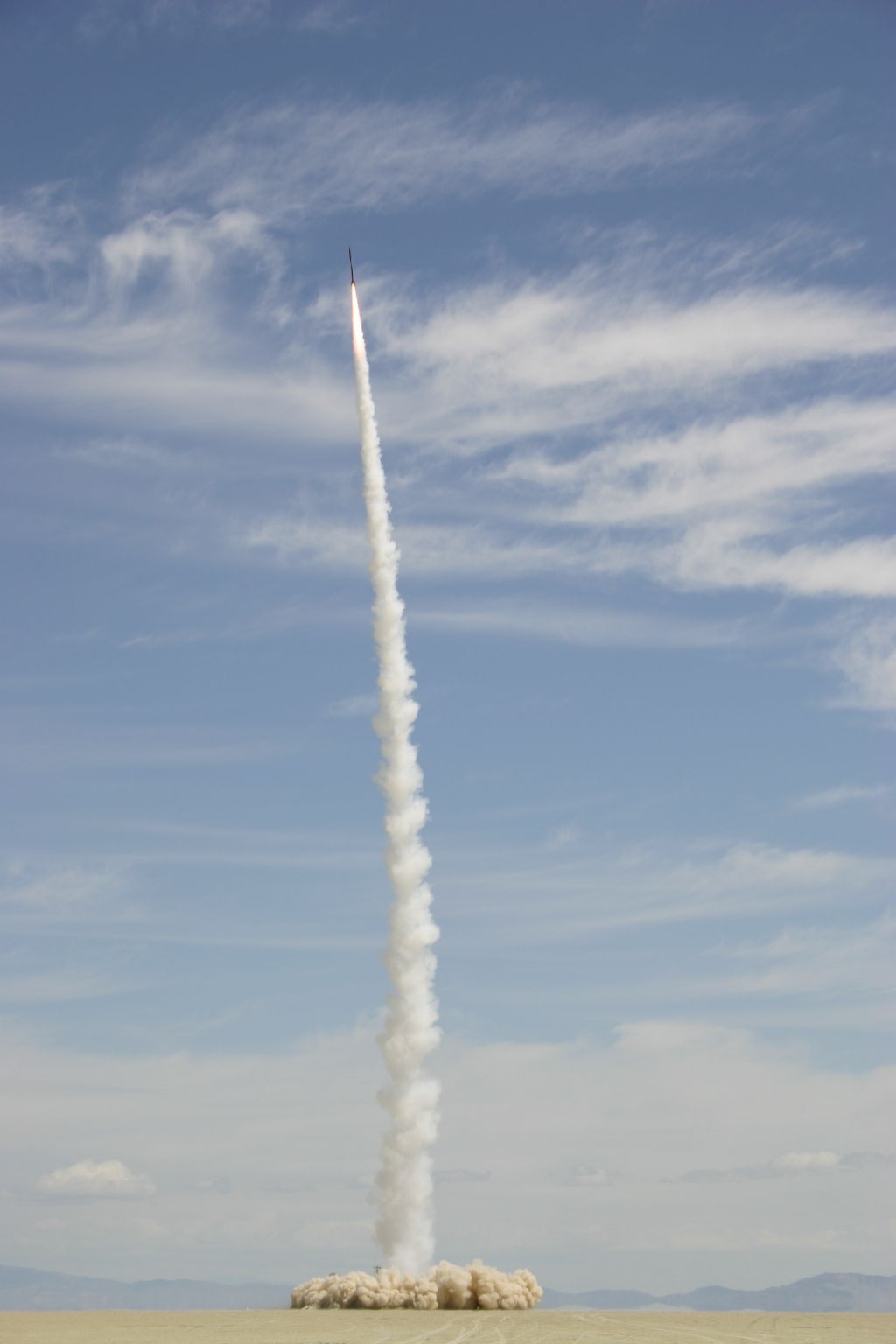
CSXT Space Shot, May 17, 2004

== Rocketry records and attempts ==
In addition to the flat surface, distance from populated areas and uncontrolled airspace over the area also attract experimentation with rockets. The following are highlights of amateur rocketry records set at Black Rock:

- On November 23, 1996, the Reaction Research Society launched a rocket to 50 miles (80 km) in altitude, a significant leap in amateur rocket altitude records at the time.
- On May 17, 2004, the Civilian Space eXploration Team (CSXT) launched a rocket to 72 miles (116 km) in altitude, which was the first amateur rocket to exceed the 62.14-mile (100.00 km) Kármán line required to claim a space flight.
- On October 20, 2024, the University of Southern California's Rocket Propulsion Laboratory (USCRPL) launched a rocket, Aftershock II, to 89 miles (143 km) in altitude, which is the highest-altitude amateur rocket launch as of June 2025.

Other rocket launches attempting various altitude records or space flights have occurred at Black Rock. In May 1999, JP Aerospace used a rockoon (balloon-launched rocket) in an unsuccessful suborbital space flight attempt covered by CNN. The rocket reached 75,000 feet (23,000 m), far less than the intended Kármán Line to reach space. CSXT made unsuccessful space launch attempts in 2000 and 2002 before the successful 2004 space flight. JP Aerospace returned to the desert in 2009, launching an armchair to the edge of space for Space Chair, an advertisement for Toshiba electronic products. On September 21, 2013, USCRPL launched its first space shot attempt, Traveler, intended to achieve a max altitude of 75 miles (121 km). The rocket experienced a catastrophic failure 3.5 seconds into the flight at an altitude of approximately 10,000 feet (3,000 m). If successful, Traveler would have been the first university/student-designed and built rocket to exceed the 62.14-mile (100.00 km) Kármán line required to claim a space flight. RPL's second attempt, Traveler II, flew in May 2014. It also failed catastrophically, approximately one second into the flight.

== History ==
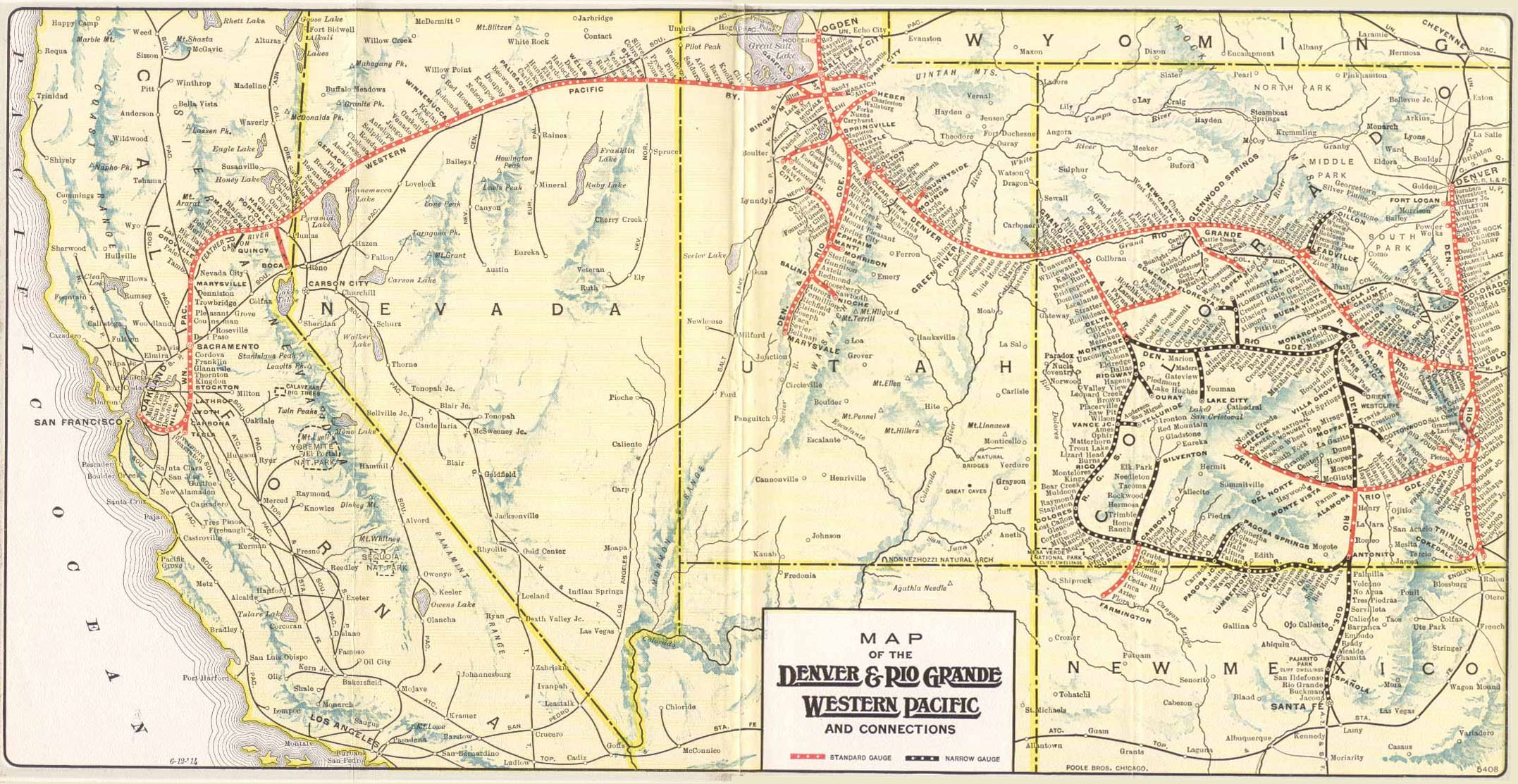
1914 WPRR map with Gerlach, Ascalon, Trego, Cholona, Ronda, and Sulphur, Nevada

More than ~15,000 years ago (15 tya), the Humboldt River flowed to the Smoke Creek–Black Rock Desert sub-basin, and during the recession of Lake Lahontan, the river diverted to the Carson Desert sub-basin. During the highest Lahontan water level (~12.7 kya), the lakebed was under about 500 ft (150 m) of water, under which sediment accumulated to form a flat lakebed.

Great Basin tribes inhabited the area approximately 10,000 B.P., and a Frémont Expedition encountered the site in 1843, but the Fortieth Parallel Survey (1867) conducted the first official exploration. In the late 1840s, Peter Lassen led California Trail emigrants through the desert's Applegate-Lassen Cutoff, an arduous route that took them hundreds of miles away from the gold lands of California. By 1910, Western Pacific's Feather River Route (Oakland to Salt Lake City) had been completed across the east side of the lakebed on the "general route first explored by Lieutenant E.G. Beckwith in 1854". By 1927, the desert had been used for filming The Winning of Barbara Worth (the 2003 Mythbusters pilot episode was also filmed in the area).

In World War II, 973 sq mi (2,520 km^{2}) of the Black Rock Desert was used for a USAAF aerial gunnery training range, and post-war, the north region of the United States Navy's Lovelock Aerial Gunnery Range was in the Black Rock Desert area (the Black Rock Desert Gunnery Range had closed by 1964). In 1979, a fossilized Columbian Mammoth was found along the side of the lakebed.

The Dooby Lane art installation was created by DeWayne "Doobie" Williams between 1978 and 1992. Guru Road, located about 2 miles north of Gerlach on Highway 34, consists of a series of art installations that include aphorisms and the names of local residents carved in to rocks. Larger installations such as "Ground Zero", Elvis, Imagination Station – Desert Broadcasting System (where the windows are TV frames with different panoramas) are also present.

The first "Balls" rocket event was held at the desert in 1993, and in 1998, the first annual Gerlach Dash glider race from Reno to the desert was held. For its 30th anniversary in 1994, the Black Rock Press (University of Nevada, Reno) published a book of desert photographs. The Friends of the Black Rock/High Rock organized in 1999, and a National Conservation Area Act the next year created several protected areas of the desert. Also in 2000, Lisa O'Shea died seven days after being scalded in Double Hot Springs when she attempted to rescue two dogs, and the Bureau of Land Management subsequently fenced "Double Hot".

=== 21st century ===
Jack Lee Harelson was fined $2.5 million in 2002 for archaeological looting of Elephant Mountain Cave. In 2010, the Bureau of Land Management Winnemucca District Office completed a roundup of 1,922 wild horses in the Calico Mountains Complex, of which 39 died of malnutrition due to overgrazing.

From 1990 to 2019, and starting again in 2022, the Black Rock Desert playa has been the location for the Burning Man festival.

== Transportation ==
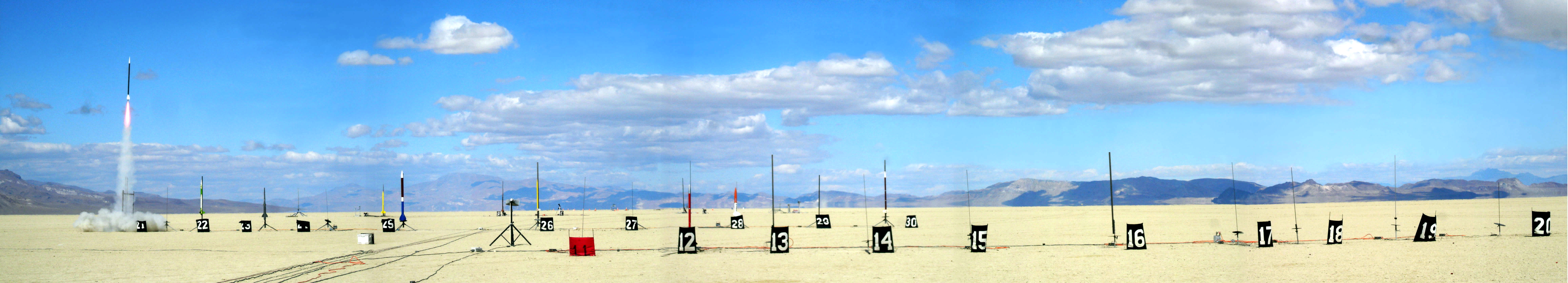
Lakebed during 2006 rocket launch

Nevada State Route 447 is the area's main highway and connects Gerlach to SR 427 at Wadsworth, Nevada, near Interstate 80. The desert's dirt roads are generally not usable in wet or snowy conditions. Old Highway 34 provides access to the playa on the west side and to the Hualapai Flat. Old Highway 48 (dirt) connects the playa to Lovelock, and Old Highway 49 (Jungo Road, dirt) provides access to the lakebed from the Sulphur and Jungo ghost towns.

The Union Pacific Railroad Elko Subdivision runs along the lakebed's east side between Sulphur and Gerlach. The railroad was constructed in the early 1900s as the Western Pacific Railroad Feather River Route.

Light aircraft have landed on the lakebed for events (the nearby Empire and Reno-Tahoe International Airports provide commercial service for the area).
