= Jackson Mountains =

Mountain range in Nevada, United States

- King Lear Peak from Sulphur

Highest point
- Peak: Quinn Peak
- Elevation: 2,772 m (9,094 ft)

Geography
- Location within Nevada
- Country: United States
- State: Nevada
- District: Humboldt County
- Range coordinates: 41°19′24.642″N 118°29′49.578″W
- Topo map: USGS Parrot Peak

The Jackson Mountains are a north-northeast trending mountain range in southwestern Humboldt County, Nevada. The range is flanked on the west by the Black Rock Desert and the Black Rock Range beyond. To the north across the Quinn River and Nevada State Route 140 lie the Bilk Creek Mountains. To the northeast across Kings River Valley is the Double Mountains and to the east are the Sleeping Hills. To the southeast and south lie the Eugene and Kamma Mountains. The ghost town of Sulphur lies just southwest of the pass between the Jackson and Kamma ranges. Nevada State Route 49 (Jungo Road) and the Union Pacific railroad Feather River Route traverse this pass.

The range is typical of the Basin and Range Province with isolated high mountains surrounded by downfaulted basins filled with sediments. The rocks of the range include Paleozoic sedimentary and metamorphic rocks intruded by Mesozoic igneous rocks and covered by Mesozoic and Cenozoic volcanic rocks.

The highest peak in the range is Quinn Peak, reaching 9,085 ft (2,769 m). Other mountain peaks include:

- King Lear Peak 8842 ft
- Parrot Peak 8448 ft
- Navajo Peak 7726 ft
- Buff Peak 7425 ft
- Deer Creek Peak 7106 ft
- Sugarloaf Knob 6214 ft
- White Peak 5285 ft

== Wilderness areas ==
Today the majority of the range is divided into two federally protected wilderness area, the North Jackson Mountains Wilderness and the South Jackson Mountains Wilderness. The South Jackson Wilderness offers a panoramic view including the Black Rock Desert, from the top of King Lear Peak at 8,442 feet. Topography of the wilderness is characterized by steep-sided and sharp-crested ridges spotted with juniper and are considered to be the most rugged of the Bureau of Land Management's Winnemucca District. Remnants of the historic Red Butte copper mining district can still be found nearby. The North Jackson Mountains Wilderness' topography is characterized by steep-sided, sharp-crested ridges spotted with juniper, and V-shaped rocky valleys. Elevations in the Wilderness range from 4,000 feet to the high point of Parrot Peak at 8,400 feet. Deep rugged canyons are laden with aspen, willow, and cottonwood groves. Several riparian streams support small populations of introduced rainbow trout.

=== Access and recreational opportunities ===
The Jackson Mountains are located in Humboldt County, 56 miles west of Winnemucca, Nevada. Access can be reached from Winnemucca by taking the Jungo Road west for 35 miles to Bottle Creek Road. The Jackson Mountain Range can also be reached by taking the Leonard Creek or Bottle Creek Roads south from State Route 140. The two wildernesses are divided by Trout Creek Road.

The South Jackson area has canyons on the west side of the mountains which provide access for dayhiking and backpacking. McGill, Bliss, and Alaska Canyons are scenic. The eastern slopes of the South Jackson are gentler in terrain and more suitable for horse travel. Photography, wildlife and wild horse viewing opportunities exists throughout the wilderness area. Hunting for mule deer, California bighorn sheep, antelope and game birds is popular in the area.

The North Jackson area provides for camping, dayhiking, photography, wildlife and wild horse viewing opportunities. Deer Creek, Mary Sloan, Happy Creek, and Jackson Creek are scenic streams in the North Jackson Mountains Wilderness. Due to the ruggedness of the area; base camping and dayhiking is recommended.
