= West Pinto Hot Spring =

Hot spring located in the Black Rock Desert, Nevada

West Pinto Hot Spring/Pinto Hot Springs
- Location within Nevada Location within the United States
- Location: Black Rock Desert, Nevada
- Coordinates: 41°21′25.19″N 118°48′35.43″W
- Type: hot spring
- Temperature: 199 °F (93 °C)—201 °F (94 °C) }

West Pinto Hot Spring, also known as Pinto Hot Springs, is a hot spring on public land near east of the Black Rock Range in the Black Rock Desert, Nevada.

Pinto Hot Springs consists of two springs: West Pinto Hot Spring, which is officially named by the GNIS, and East Pinto Hot Spring, which does not have an official GNIS name. The springs are located approximately 44 miles southwest of Denio, Nevada.

== History ==
In 1978, a hermit named Ronald Bristlewolf killed three people at West Pinto Hot Spring.

In 2025, the Bureau of Land Management (BLM) approved a geothermal exploration project by Ormat at Pinto Hot Springs.
