= Hardin City, Nevada =

- Ghost town
- Etymology: Named after James Allen Hardin
- Location within Nevada
- Coordinates: 41°06′53″N 119°00′09″W
- Country: United States
- State: Nevada
- County: Humboldt
- Elevation: 3,980 ft (1,210 m)
- Time zone: UTC-8 (Pacific (PST))
  - Summer (DST): PDT (UTC-7)

Hardin City was the site of a Nevada silver mining boom town from 1859 until about 1868. Hardin City was located on the western slope of the Black Rock Range in the Black Rock Desert.

== Timeline ==
In 1849, James Allen Hardin traveled the Applegate-Lassen Trail. While north of the Black Rock, he found ore that at the time he thought was lead. He returned to camp with thirty or forty pounds and found that it easily melted. They made bullets out of a portion, left a portion at the camp and kept a portion. The portion that remained at camp was later found and eventually assayed to be a carbonate of lead and silver. Hardin smelted a portion of the rock down to a button that many thought to be silver. Hardin sent the button to San Francisco in 1850, where it was lost in the fire of 1850 (possibly the San Francisco Fire of 1851?). In the meantime, Hardin had settled in Petaluma, California. In 1858, an expedition was launched to find the mine. As with many stories of a lost mine, nothing was found, though there was a rush and the town of Hardin City was created.

On April 26, 1859 Peter Lassen and Edward Clapper were killed nearby at what was later called Clapper Creek while searching for silver first reported by Hardin.

In May 1860, news of the First Battle of Pyramid Lake caused the prospectors to leave the area.

In 1866, prospectors returned to the area and a post office was in operation as Harden City from July 1866 until October 1866 and then as Harveyville from October 1866 until August 1867. During that time, ore from the area was refined, but silver could not be reliably recovered. Fairfield wrote that the mills were processing ore from the Comstock Lode, which was being released by the alkali dust in the Black Rock ore. This would account for the fact that the first run of Black Rock ore would result in high values, but later runs would have low values.

The Hardin City area never produced significant quantities of silver, though Ladue Vary came to Hardin City to prospect and in 1884 found silver and gold to the northeast.

In 1909, a specimen of ore similar to the ore found by Hardin was discovered at Hardin City in a pile of ore left by previous prospectors.

Vanderburg states that Hardin's silver was probably from the Silver Camel mine near Sulphur, Nevada. The Silver Camel Mine has cerargyrite also known as chlorargyrite or horn silver. Cerargyite is silver chloride (AgCl), which does not match the carbonate of silver and lead as reported by Fairfield above.
