= Deep Hole, Nevada =

- Ghost town
- Location within the state of Nevada Deep Hole, Nevada (the United States)
- Coordinates: 40°43′09″N 119°29′00″W
- Country: United States
- State: Nevada
- County: Washoe
- Founder: Ladue Vary
- Named for: Deep Hole Spring
- Elevation: 3,927 ft (1,197 m)

Deep Hole is a ghost town in Washoe County, Nevada. Founded by Ladue Vary in 1856, Deep Hole is located southwest of the Granite Range in the Black Rock Desert at the north end of the Smoke Creek Desert.

== History ==
=== Numaga and Lander ===
In 1860, Frederick W. Lander negotiated peace with the Paiute leader Numaga at Deep Hole Spring during the Paiute War. Lander's assistant commissary agent captured five Northern Paiute near the Humboldt River. He released two of them in exchange for a promise that they would return with their leader, Naanah. Lander and Neenah met on 12 August, and they agreed that Naanah would bring Numaga to a meeting at Deep Hole Springs. On 21 August 1860 Numaga met with Lander at the agreed location, and after eating food prepared by Lander's men the two men smoked for a while. Lander opened the negotiation by saying he could relay Numaga's grievances to the "Great Father" in Washington, but could make no promises.

Numaga said he was pleased to hear no promises, because the whites had never kept any promises they had made in the past. He said he could not guarantee being able to prevent attacks by roaming bands of Paiutes, any more than the "Great Father" had shown he was able to prevent whites from killing Indians. He said that the violence was due to the hostile attitude of whites, who had ravaged Paiute women and killed their men without cause. He disclaimed responsibility for the Williams Station massacre, which he blamed on a group of Bannocks over whom he had no authority. However, he said that if the whites had come to him afterwards to discuss the problem, as had been agreed by treaty, there would have been no need for fighting.

Lander asked Numaga to try to restrain the Paiutes from hostilities for a year, and he would try to arrange a treaty under which they would retain possession of the lands they held and regain possession or be paid for lands that had been seized from them. Numaga accepted this. He said he would try to bring Poito to meet with Frederick Dodge, the Indian agent, to arrange a formal truce.

=== 1860s ===
A post office was in operation from July 1866 through August 1867 and from February 1894 until October 1911.

In July, 1869, two men were murdered at Deep Hole and four Paiutes were murdered in retribution. In 1965, a nearby ridge was named Bloody Point to commemorate this incident.

=== Louis Gerlach ===
Louis Gerlach bought the Deep Hole, Granite Creek and Clear Creek ranches in the 1884 or 1890s. In 1906, the nearby town of Gerlach, Nevada was established and named for Louis Gerlach. In 1920, Gerlach sold his 22,000 head of cattle and went into the sheep business. The Gerlach Livestock Company owned Deep Hole at least through 1936. The property was sold in the 1940s.
