= King Lear Peak =

Mountain in the state of Nevada

- King Lear Peak from Sulphur, Nevada

Highest point
- Elevation: 2,695 m (8,842 ft)
- Coordinates: 41°12′09″N 118°33′19″W

Geography
- Location within Nevada
- Country: United States
- State: Nevada
- Region: Humboldt County
- District: Jackson Mountains
- Topo map: USGS King Lear Peak

King Lear Peak is a summit in the Jackson Mountains of Humboldt County, Nevada, overlooking the Black Rock Desert to the west.

== Cultural references ==
King Lear Peak is referenced in the final section of the 1996 epic poem Mountains and Rivers Without End by Gary Snyder, entitled “Finding the Space in the Heart.”
