= Deep Hole =

Deep Hole or Deephole may refer to:

== Places in the United States ==
- Deephole, Kentucky, an unincorporated community in Lawrence County
- Deep Hole, Nevada, a ghost town
- Deep Hole, Virginia, an unincorporated community in Accomack County

== Mathematics ==
- Deep holes, certain points in a Leech lattice
