= South Jackson Mountains Wilderness =

U.S. Wilderness Area in Nevada

South Jackson Mountains
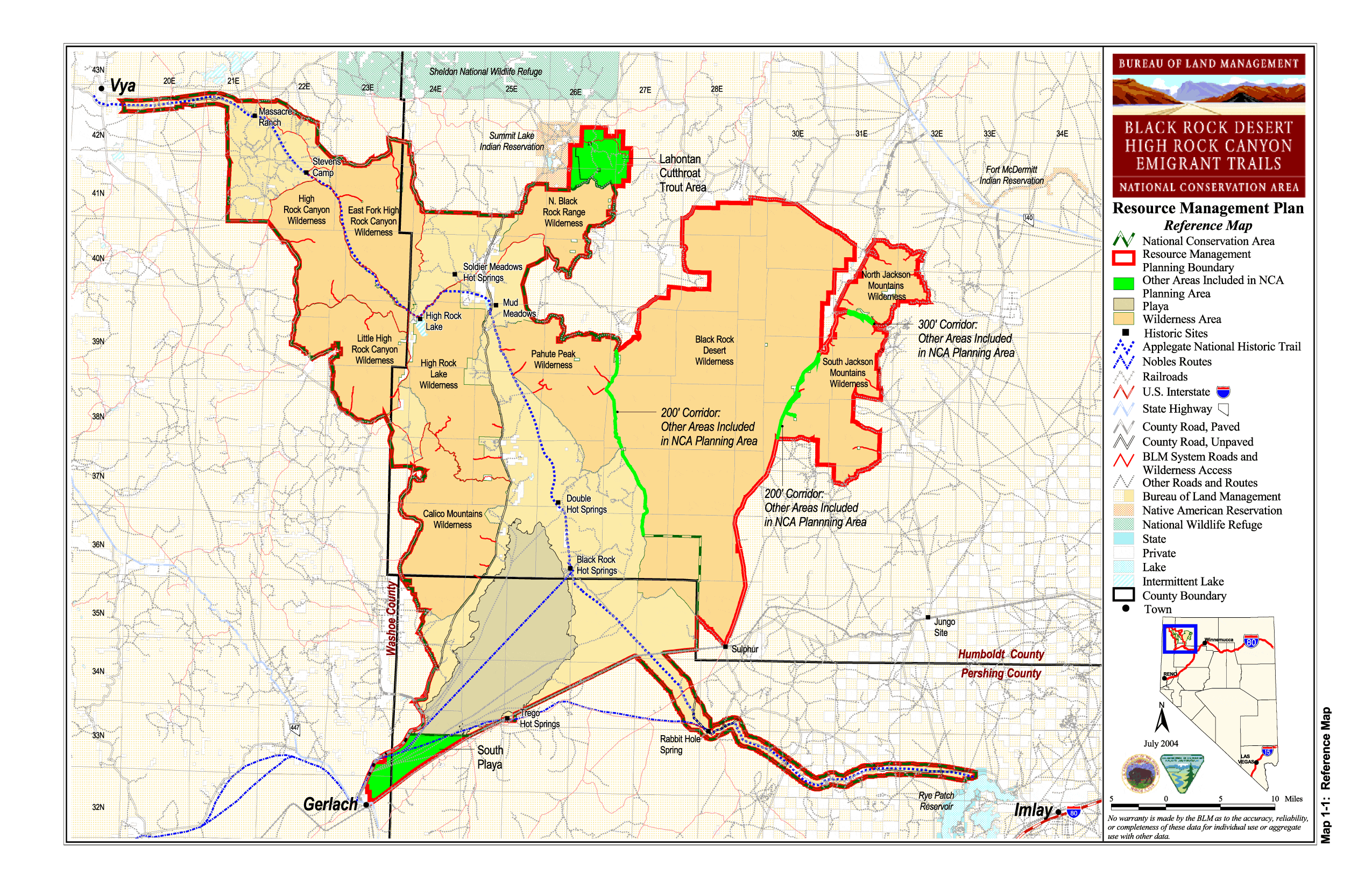
- BLM map of the Black Rock-High Rock NCA and 10 wilderness areas including South Jackson Mountains Wilderness

- Location within Nevada
- Location: Black Rock Desert, Nevada, United States
- Coordinates: 41°12′21.643″N 118°32′34.579″W
- Elevation: 2,290 m (7,510 ft)
- Established: 2000
- Operator: Bureau of Land Management

The South Jackson Mountains Wilderness is a U.S. Wilderness Area in Nevada under the Bureau of Land Management. It is located in the Jackson Mountains, south of the North Jackson Mountains Wilderness and east of the Black Rock Desert Wilderness.

== See also ==
- Black Rock Desert-High Rock Canyon Emigrant Trails National Conservation Area
