= North Jackson Mountains Wilderness =

Protected wilderness in the U.S. state of Nevada

North Jackson Mountains
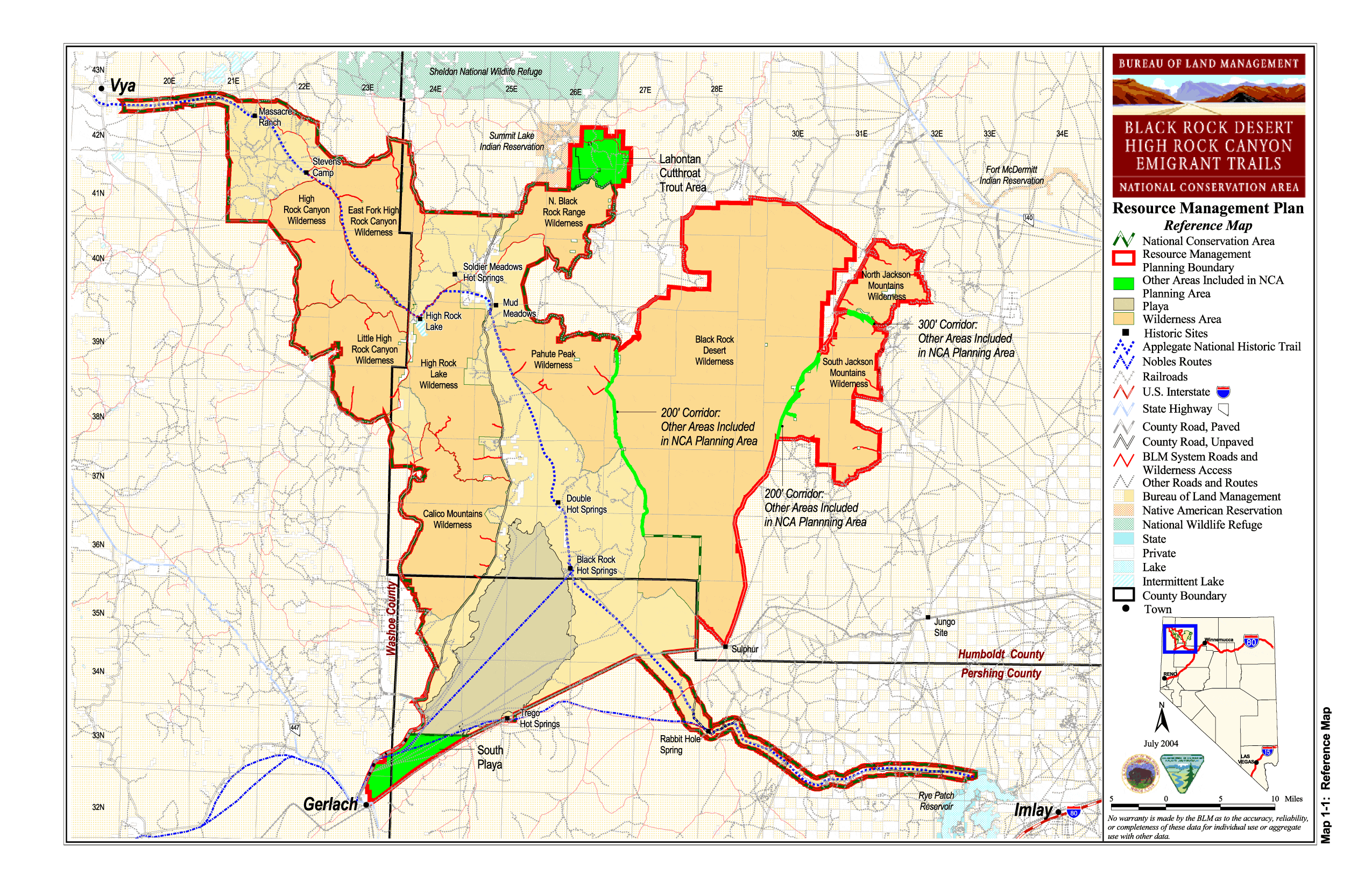
- BLM map of the Black Rock-High Rock NCA and 10 wilderness areas including North Jackson Mountains Wilderness

- Location within Nevada
- Location: Black Rock Desert, Nevada, United States
- Coordinates: 41°21′40″N 118°28′20″W
- Elevation: 2,363 m (7,753 ft)
- Established: 2000
- Operator: Bureau of Land Management

The North Jackson Mountains Wilderness is a U S Wilderness Area in Nevada under the Bureau of Land Management. It is located in the Jackson Mountains north of the South Jackson Mountains Wilderness and east of the Black Rock Desert Wilderness.

== See also ==
- Black Rock Desert-High Rock Canyon Emigrant Trails National Conservation Area
