= Lovelock Aerial Gunnery Range =

- military region
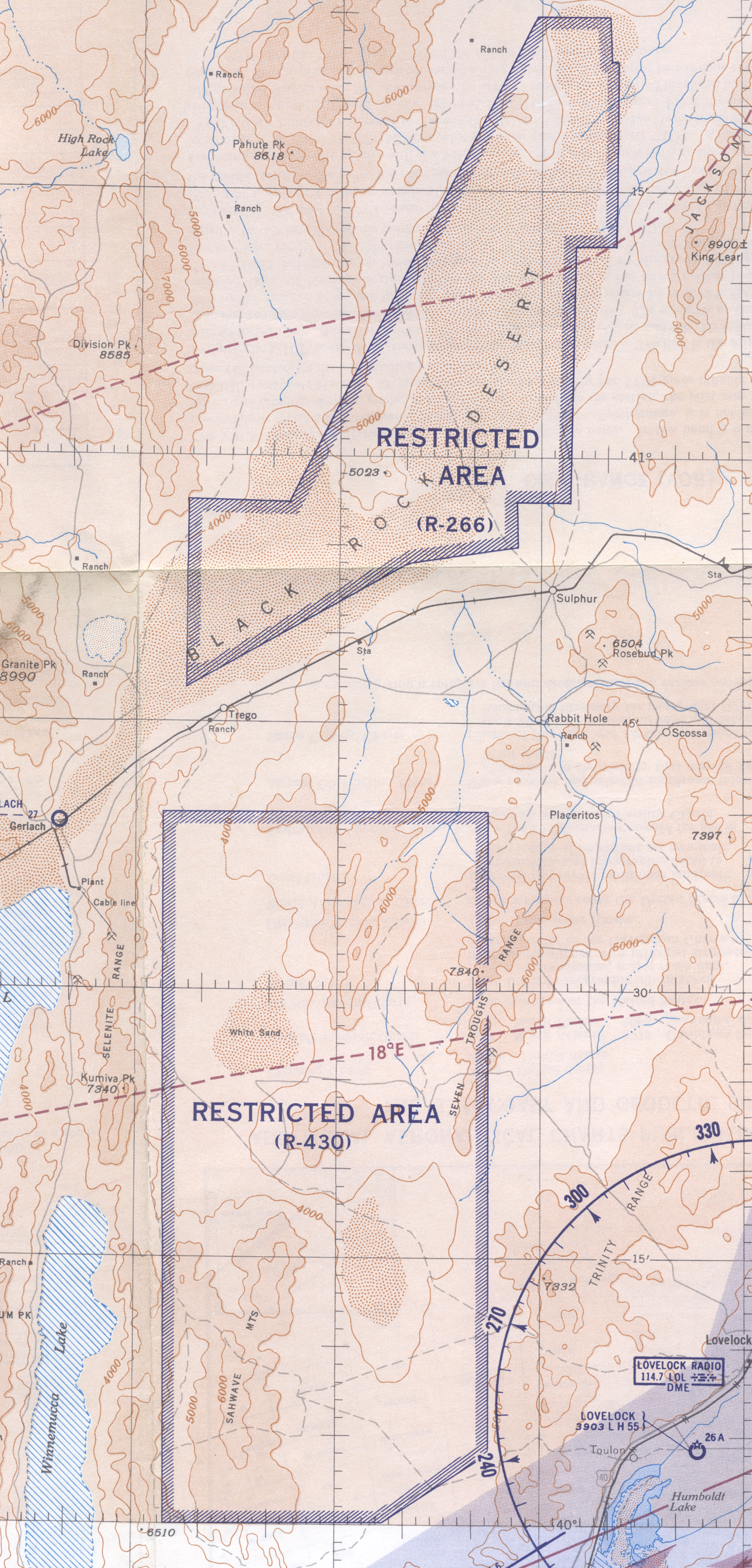
- 1955 map of "U. S. Prohibited, Restricted, Caution and Warning Areas on Elko Sectional Chart": "Black Rock Desert" (R-266) and "Sahwave Mountains" (R-430)
- Interactive map of Lovelock Aerial Gunnery Range
- Coordinates: 37°32′N 116°12′W
- Country: United States
- State: Nevada
- Counties: North: Pershing; South: Humboldt
- Years: 1945–1963

Area
  - Total: 0 sq mi (0 km^{2})

Lovelock Aerial Gunnery Range was a World War II facility in two Nevada areas used for "aerial gunnery, strafing, dive bombing [and] rocket fire". By 21 November 1944, the Lovelock Range had been approved by the Secretary of the Navy to be developed for Naval Air Station Fallon, and on 13 January 1945, "Lovelock Air to Air" began when "leased under the Second War Powers Act". By February 1945, land was being acquired for the North Range in the Black Rock Desert which was 1,122 sq mi (2,910 km^{2}) that included 64.4 sq mi (167 km^{2}) of "Patented" (leased private) land. The South Range in the Granite Springs Valley was 2,436 sq mi (6,310 km^{2}), and in March 1945 "1920 Acres more" were added.

The post-war range was reactivated in October 1945 when the United States Navy closed more than 1,563 sq mi (4,050 km^{2}) to the public in the two Lovelock Aerial Gunnery Range regions. The Department of the Interior permit for the North Portion was cancelled by a 6 March 1946 letter, and the Bureau of Yards and Docks was directed to cancel the leases for the South Portion on 7 January 1947.

== Black Rock Desert Gunnery Range ==
The 1942 area of 973 sq mi (2,520 km^{2}) in the Black Rock Desert for World War II USAAF aerial gunnery (Targets 25, 26, 27 in areas 1, 2, 3) was used for a 1949 Navy range of 745 sq mi (1,930 km^{2}) that was reactivated near Sulphur, Nevada. After a 1955 request by congressman Clair Engle, the Black Rock Desert Gunnery Range was closed by 1964.

== Sahwave Mountain Air to Air Gunnery Range ==
In 1958, after the World War II, Lovelock South range was "renamed Sahwave Mountain Air to Air Gunnery Range. The 500,000 acres was acquired by Public Land Order No. 3632. Formal acquisition of the range was completed in August". Used for "only machine gun" fire, the 547,906 acres (856.103 sq mi) "Basic Sahwave air-to-air gunnery range" was in use by October 1958.

On 25 October 1976, after an INS platform failure during night training, Lockheed SR-71A, 61-7965, (Article 2016) was lost near Lovelock. The pilot and reconnaissance systems operator both ejected safely.
