= Pahute =

Pahute, or variants, may refer to:

- Paiute, Native American people
- Pah-Ute County, Arizona Territory, a former county 1865–1871

== See also ==
- Pahute Mesa (landform), southern Nevada
- Pahute Mesa, test site sub-region at southeast of Pahute Mesa landform
- Pahute Mesa Airstrip
- Pahute Peak Wilderness, northwest Nevada
