= Quinn Peak (Nevada) =

Mountain in Nevada, United States

- Location within Nevada

Highest point
- Elevation: 9,085 ft (2,769 m)
- Prominence: 4,863 ft (1,482 m) NAVD 88
- Coordinates: 41°18′12″N 118°24′59″W

Geography
- Location: Humboldt County, Nevada, U.S.
- Parent range: Jackson Mountains

Quinn Peak is the highest mountain in the Jackson Mountains of Humboldt County in Nevada, United States. It is the most topographically prominent peak in Humboldt County and ranks tenth among the most topographically prominent peaks in Nevada. The peak is on public land administered by the Bureau of Land Management and thus has no access restrictions.

== Dan Dobbins Peak ==
A variant name of the peak is "Dan Dobbins Peak". The peak register dated 10-8-88 states "Named after Dan Dobbins a young mother lode chapter climber & inspiring leader who was killed in a truck accident in 1978". On November 21, 1978, a 24-year-old Sacramento man name Daniel Dobbins was killed while driving a van near San Juan Bautista. In 1986, the Motherload Chapter of the Sierra Club awarded a Dan Dobbins Youth Award.
