= Jack Lee Harelson =

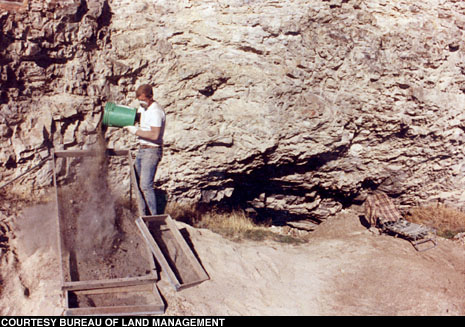
Jack Lee Harelson looting Elephant Mountain Cave in the Black Rock Desert

Jack Lee Harelson (1940 - December 14, 2012) was an American insurance agent, best known for desecrating and looting a Paiute Indian burial site in the Black Rock Desert of Nevada.

== Biography ==
Jack Lee Harelson was an insurance agent in Grants Pass, Oregon. In 1995, one of his former business partners in an opal mine tipped off police that Harelson had been looting Amerindian sites. In exchange for immunity from prosecution, Harelson's ex-wife Pamela Ralph led police investigators to an Elephant Mountain Cave in the Black Rock Desert in Nevada. She stated that she and Harelson had dug and collected American Indian treasures in the early 1980s. She had photographs of the cave that had significantly grown after three years of digging. Harelson had built a wall to hide a dirt pile. Digging had totally destroyed the site, which had included various artifacts, including those from the Paiute tribe.

Oregon State Police recovered over 2,000 artifacts from Harelson's home in Grants Pass, including 10,000-year-old sandals. In Harelson's garden, police found two headless bodies of Paiute children wrapped in plastic garbage bags. These bodies were historical, maybe 2,000 years old. The heads were not found. Ralph said that bodies were intact when they were found in two large baskets.

The state prosecutor charged Harelson for looting and desecrating the site. He was charged with aggravated theft, abuse of corpses, tampering with evidence and possessing illegal gambling devices. The main witness in the case was Pamela Ralph, but his former business partners also testified.

Harelson admitted only to digging a "test hole" and removing some artifacts and said that he had intended to attract interest of archaeologists and to hand the artifacts over later. He stated that he had reported significant paleontological finds to the Nevada State Museum. The museum acknowledged that.

Harelson's defense claimed he was a collector who had bought the Amerindian artifacts and was not involved with dealing them. The defense tried to have charges dismissed on the grounds that the statute of limitations had expired. The prosecutor successfully argued that continued possession of the items constituted continuation of the crime. Harelson was found guilty of abuse of a corpse and possession of state property. He received a fine of $20,000 and spent 30 days in jail.

Harelson lost his insurance agent's licence and began an online business, called Jack's Outback, selling opals and things like petroglyph reproductions and artifact display cases. According to a later police report, he also continued to deal in illegal antiquities and solicited excavation of sites in Oregon and Nevada.

On December 6, 2002, a federal administrative law judge in Oregon fined Harelson $2.5 million for destruction of archaeological resources. Further investigation unearthed two skulls that may have belonged to the two Paiute corpses. Harelson claimed that he had no money and accused the government of turning him into a scapegoat. Behind the scenes, police investigation about his antique dealings continued.

In January 2003, authorities discovered that Harelson intended to kill police sergeant Walt Markee (who had searched Harelson's home), County Judge Loyd O'Neal (who had presided over the 1996 trial), Harelson's ex-wife and two former business partners. An undercover policeman approached Harelson in the role of a hitman willing to carry out the murders for a price. Harelson paid the policeman $10,000 in the form of opals after the policeman showed Harelson a fabricated photograph of the corpse of one of the intended murder victims. The transaction was videotaped, and police later arrested Harelson in his home with the help of a SWAT team.

In 2004, the State of Oregon charged Harelson with multiple counts of conspiracy to commit aggravated murder and illegal possession of a firearm. He was sent to jail without bail to await sentencing. Later in 2004, Harelson's bid to overturn the $2.5 million fine failed. As of October 2009, Harelson was serving a 10-year prison sentence in the Eastern Oregon Correctional Institution in Pendleton, Oregon. Harelson died on December 14, 2012, in the Oregon State Penitentiary in Salem.
