= Fox Range =

Mountain range in Nevada, United States

- Location within Nevada

Highest point
- Peak: Pah-Rum Peak
- Elevation: 2,319 m (7,608 ft)
- Coordinates: 40°23′26″N 119°34′32″W

Dimensions
- Length: 24 mi (39 km) N_S
- Width: 9 mi (14 km) E-W
- Area: 150 mi^{2} (390 km^{2})

Geography
- Country: United States
- State: Nevada
- Region: Black Rock Desert
- District: Washoe County
- Range coordinates: 40°26′12.651″N 119°34′6.693″W
- Topo map: USGS Pah-Rum Peak

The Fox Range is a mountain range in east central Washoe County, Nevada.

Gerlach, Black Rock Desert and the Granite Range lie to the north and northeast. The Selenite Range is to the east beyond the San Emidio Desert and Poito Valley. The Lake Range lies to the southeast and Pyramid Lake is to the south. The Smoke Creek Desert is to the west. The Pyramid Lake Indian Reservation occupies the southern third of the range.
