= Badger Mountains =

Mountain range in Nevada, United States

- Location within Nevada

Highest point
- Elevation: 2,191 m (7,188 ft)

Geography
- Country: United States
- State: Nevada
- District: Washoe County
- Range coordinates: 41°36′58.626″N 119°20′3.722″W
- Topo map: USGS Badger Mountain SE

The Badger Mountains is a mountain range in Washoe County, Nevada. The southern portion is within the East Fork High Rock Canyon Wilderness. The northern portion is within the Sheldon National Wildlife Refuge.
