= Pahute Peak Wilderness =

Wilderness area in Nevada, United States

Pahute Peak
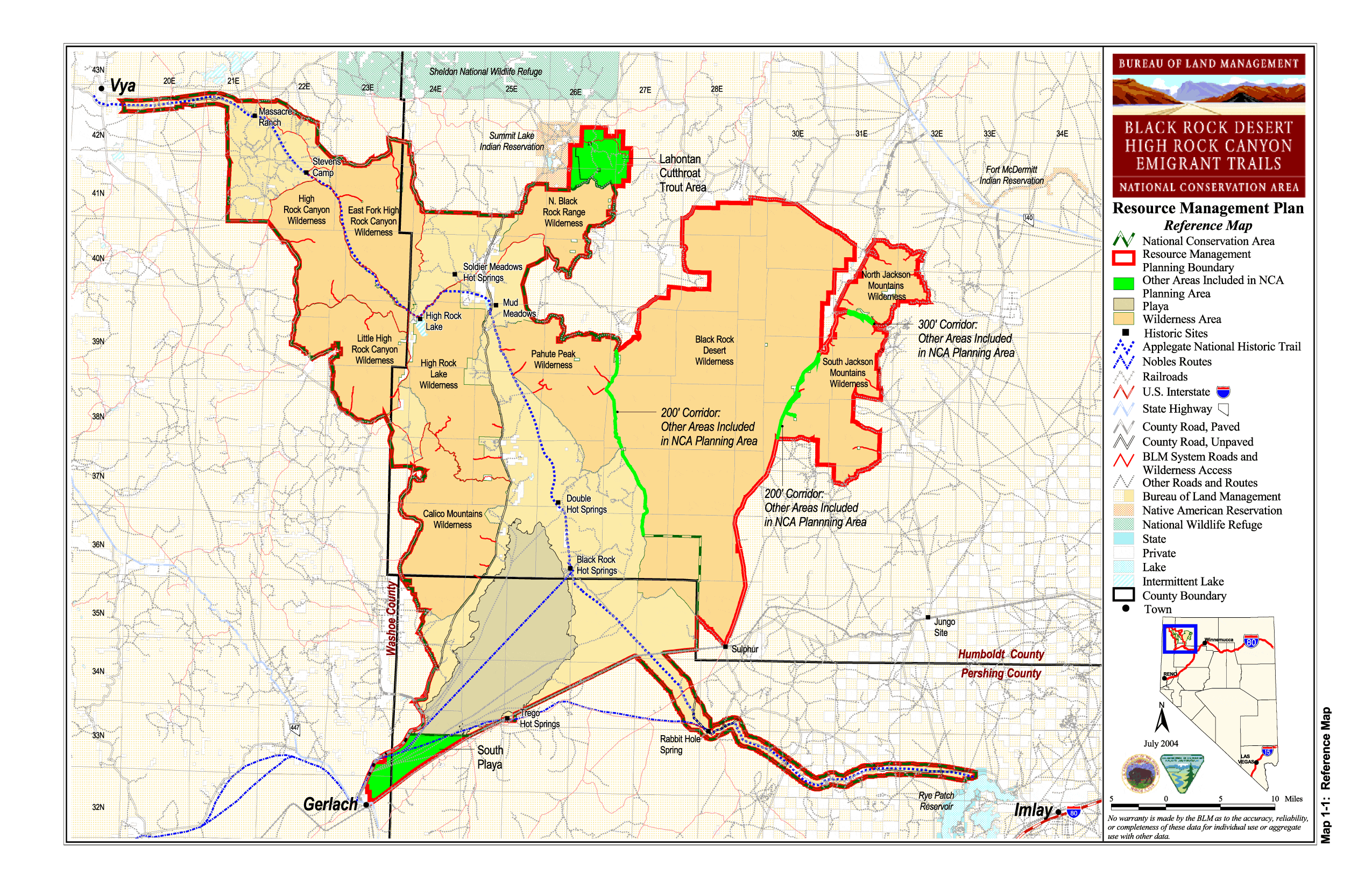
- BLM map of the Black Rock-High Rock NCA and 10 wilderness areas including Pahute Peak Wilderness

- Location within Nevada
- Location: Black Rock Desert, Nevada, United States
- Coordinates: 41°13′25.634″N 119°1′19.642″W
- Elevation: 1,677 m (5,502 ft)
- Established: 2000
- Operator: Bureau of Land Management

The Pahute Peak Wilderness is a U S Wilderness Area in Nevada under the Bureau of Land Management. It is located in the central Black Rock Range west of the Black Rock Desert Wilderness.

== See also ==
- Black Rock Desert-High Rock Canyon Emigrant Trails National Conservation Area
