= Black Rock Desert Wilderness =

Protected area in Nevada, United States

Black Rock Desert
- IUCN category Ib (wilderness area)
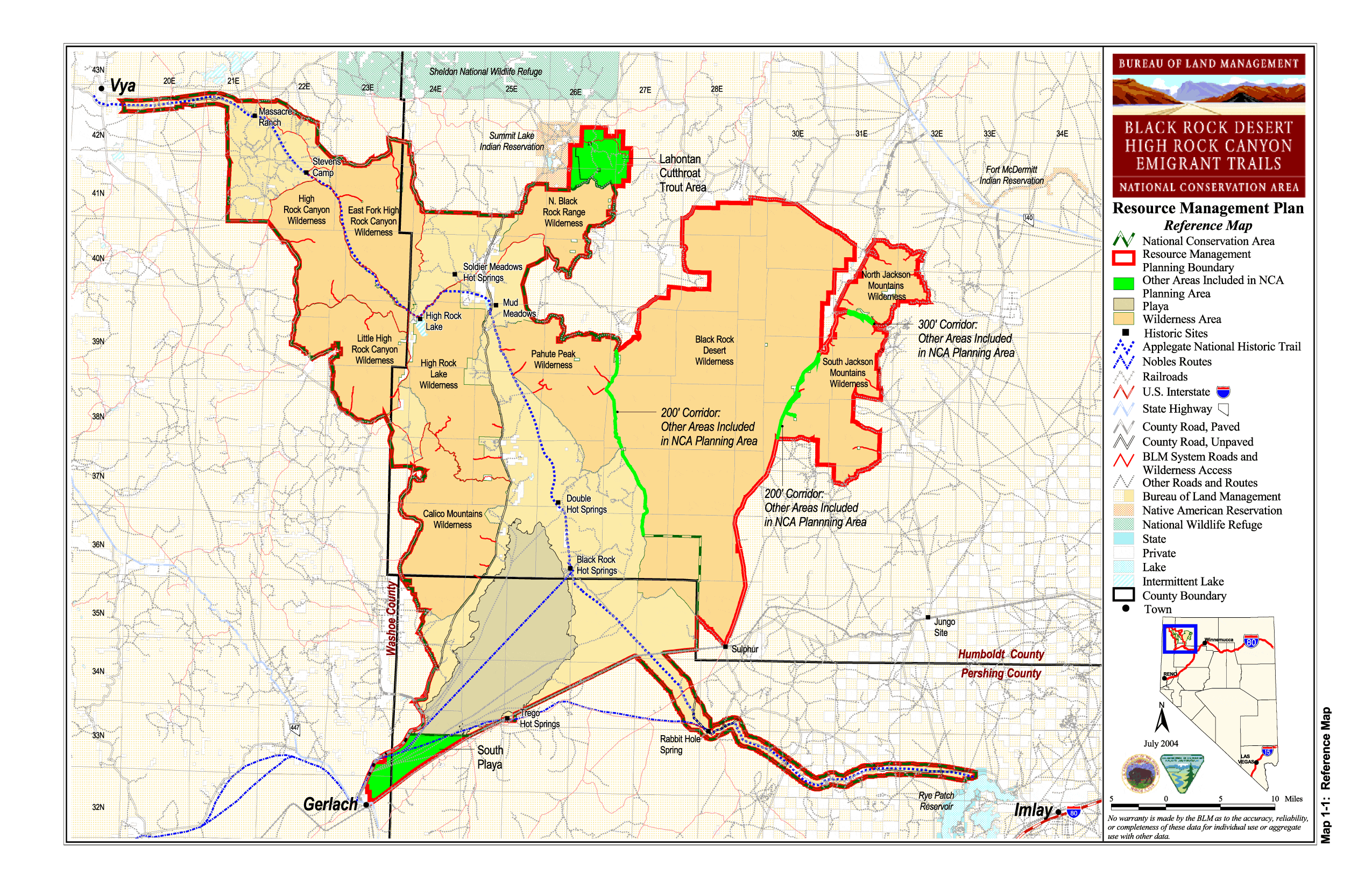
- BLM map of the Black Rock-High Rock NCA and 10 wilderness areas including Black Rock Desert Wilderness

- Location within Nevada Location within the United States
- Location: Black Rock Desert, Nevada, United States
- Coordinates: 41°13′0.639″N 118°45′21.606″W
- Elevation: 1,207 m (3,960 ft)
- Established: 2000
- Operator: Bureau of Land Management

The Black Rock Desert Wilderness is a U S Wilderness Area in Nevada under the Bureau of Land Management. It is located in the east arm of the Black Rock Desert playa east of the Black Rock Range and west of the Jackson Mountains. The wilderness has a land area of 314,829 acres, or 1,274.1 km^{2}. It is the largest U.S. designated wilderness area that is managed solely by the Bureau of Land Management, and the largest that is not located within a National Forest, National Park (or Preserve), or National Wildlife Refuge. It is located within the Black Rock Desert – High Rock Canyon Emigrant Trails National Conservation Area, also managed by the BLM.

== See also ==
- Black Rock Desert-High Rock Canyon Emigrant Trails National Conservation Area
- List of largest wilderness areas in the United States
