= High Rock Canyon Wilderness =

Protected area in Nevada, United States

High Rock Canyon
- IUCN category Ib (wilderness area)
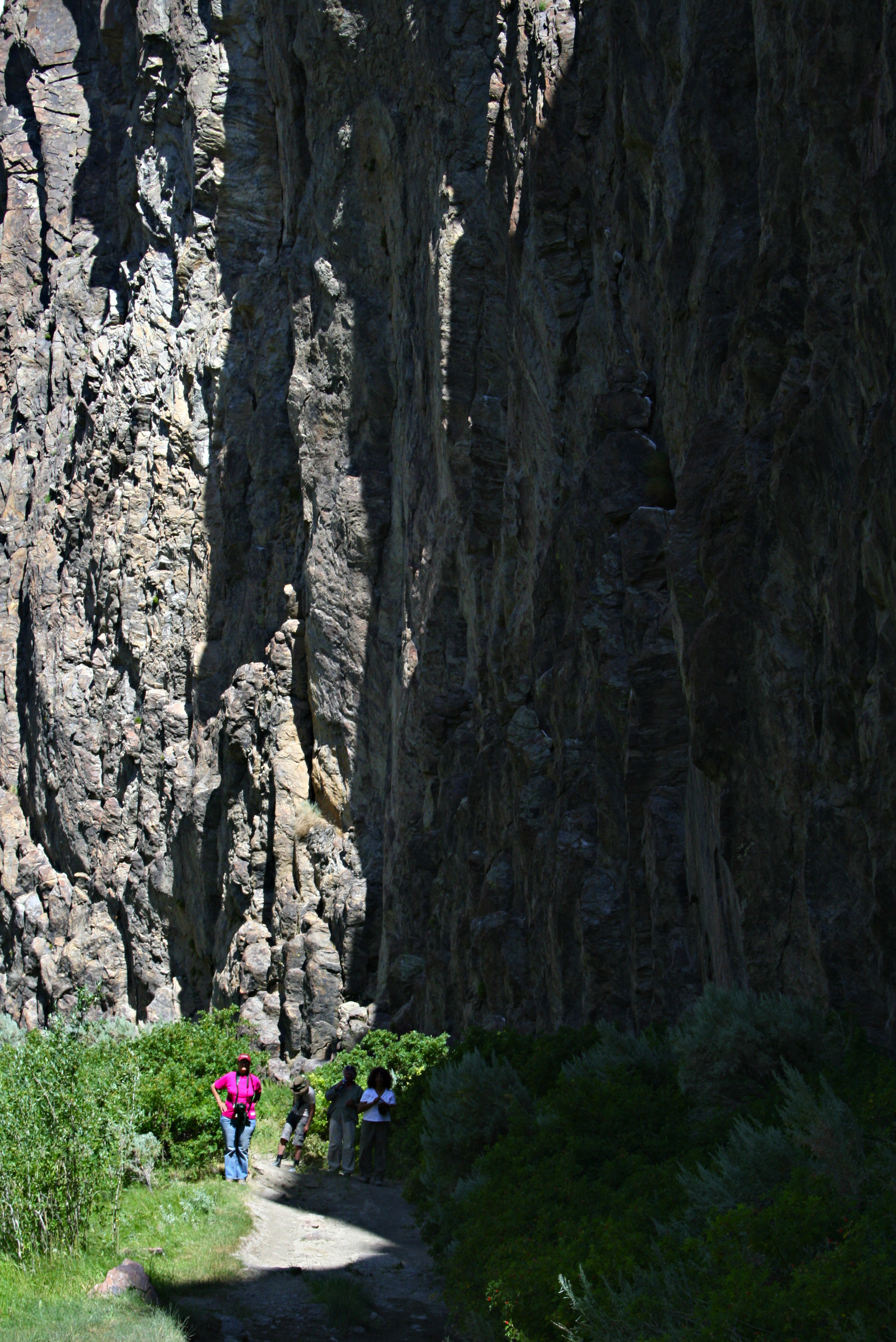
- Hikers in High Rock Canyon

- Location within the United States Location within Nevada
- Location: Black Rock Desert, Nevada, United States
- Coordinates: 41°23′8.628″N 119°27′17.715″W
- Elevation: 1,743 m (5,719 ft)
- Established: 2000
- Operator: Bureau of Land Management

The High Rock Canyon Wilderness is a U S Wilderness Area in Nevada under the Bureau of Land Management. It is located on the southwest side of High Rock Canyon and north of the Little High Rock Canyon Wilderness. It does not include the 4x4 trail in High Rock Canyon.

== See also ==
- Black Rock Desert-High Rock Canyon Emigrant Trails National Conservation Area
- Massacre Range
