= Nevada State Route 49 =

Former state highway in Nevada, United States

Former State Route 49, also known as Jungo Road, is an unimproved road in Northern Nevada from County Route 447 (former State Route 34) near Gerlach east to Winnemucca via the ghost towns of Sulphur and Jungo. It crosses the Kamma Mountains northeast of Sulphur. Most of the route runs parallel to the Feather River Route, a rail line originally built by the Western Pacific Railroad. In addition to an access for the ghost towns, the road also is an access for the Black Rock Desert from the East.

Although still commonly referred to as State Route 49, the dirt road is not maintained by the Nevada Department of Transportation. It was eliminated as a state route as part of a Nevada state route renumbering project that began in 1976. The highway last appeared as a state route in the 1980 edition of the official Nevada Highway Map. Today, the portion of the road within Humboldt County is designated County Route 55.
