= Jungo, Nevada =

- Ghost town
- Location within Nevada Location within the United States
- Coordinates: 40°55′00″N 118°22′55″W
- Country: United States
- State: Nevada
- County: Humboldt
- Elevation: 4,170 ft (1,270 m)

Jungo is a ghost town located on Humboldt County Route 55 (former Nevada State Route 49), between Winnemucca, Nevada and Sulphur, Nevada. At one time, Jungo boasted a hotel, store, filling station and blacksmith's shop, though no buildings remain.

The town of Jungo is named for Jungo Point, a survey peak located 11 miles away; in 1888, Jungo Point was a stage stop on a mail route between Winnemucca and "Denio's".

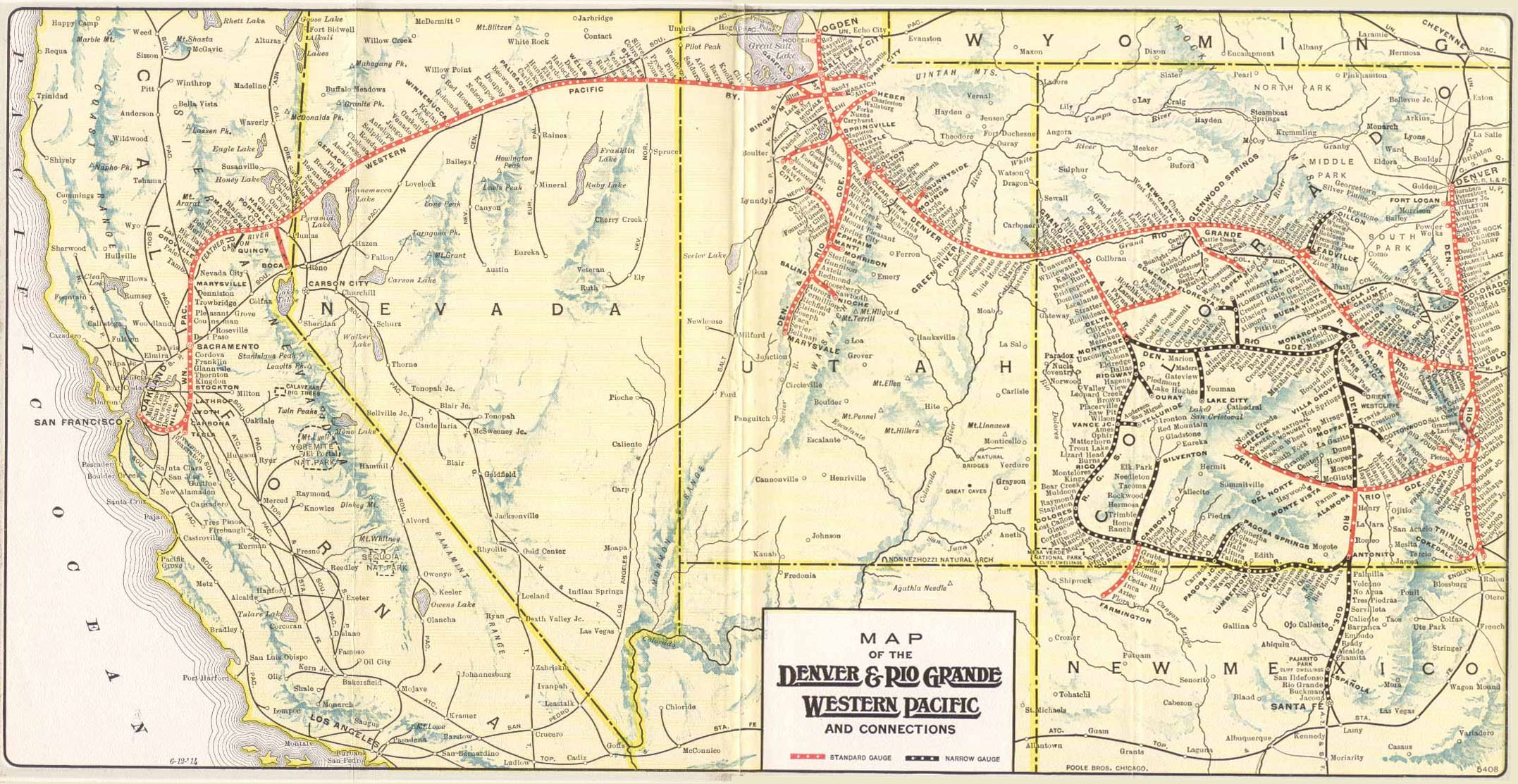
1914 WPRR map with Gerlach, Trego, Sulphur, Jungo, and Winnemucca stations identified

The post office at Jungo was in operation from January 1911 until May 1952. Jungo was a station on the Feather River Route of the Western Pacific Railroad. In 1913, Jungo consisted of twelve buildings that included the station, a freight shed, a pumping station, a hotel and a saloon.

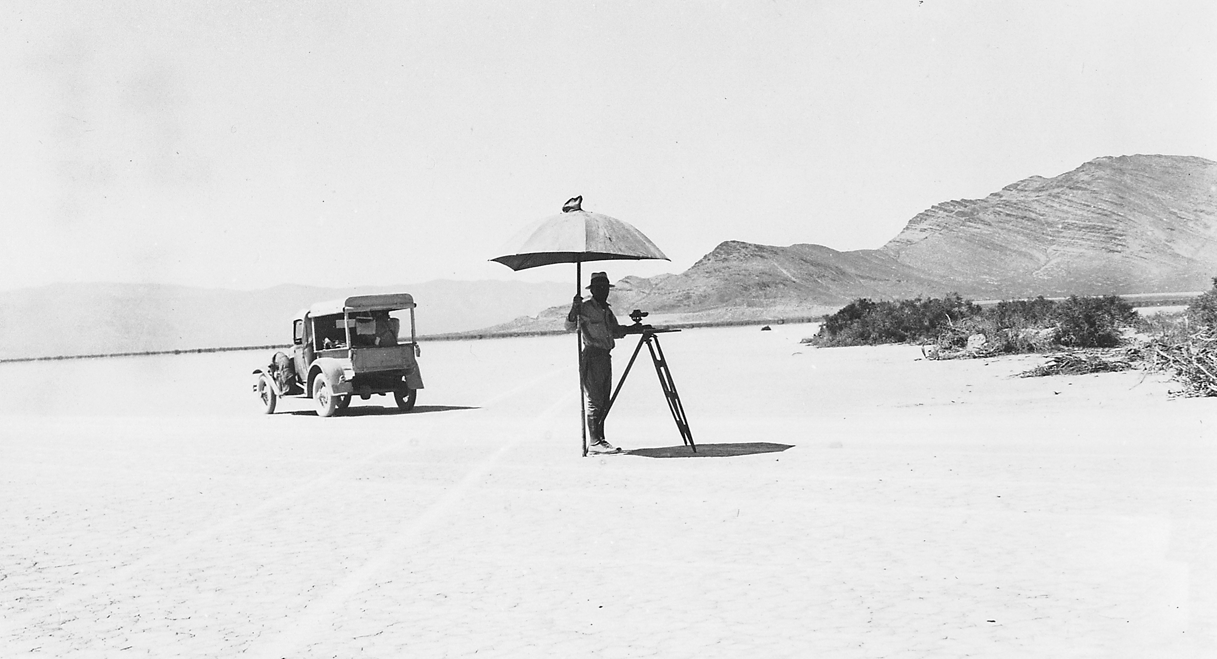
"Mapping the north half of the Lovelock 1° quadrangle in the desert area near Jungo, Nevada – August 1931"

George Austin lived in Jungo in 1915 and operated the hotel, filling station and general store at Jungo in the 1930s. In 1935, Austin purchased the Jumbo Mine, located 36 miles away, from two prospectors by the names of Grover Staggs who went by Red Staggs and the others name was Clyde Taylor, for $10,000.00 ($235,000 today) with $500 due immediately. Mining engineer and former U.S. President Herbert Hoover visited Jungo in 1936 and advised Austin to retain ownership of Jumbo. Austin offered to pay Hoover for the advice and Hoover replied, "That kind of advice is free." Austin received many offers for the mine and stated that if he sold the mine for $1,000,000, then he would owe the $420,000 in taxes, but that the taxes don't apply if the gold is in the ground. Austin was also concerned about his sons becoming "loafers" if they were rich.

In 1937, a group of Texas oilmen including H. L. Hunt placed an option to buy Jumbo Mine with a $250,000 ($5,599,000 today) down payment.

The population was 50 in 1940.

The Jungo Hotel was in operation in 1955.

In 2012, Recology received a permit to build a Municipal Solid Waste Disposal site at Jungo.
