= Yellow Hills =

Mountain range in Nevada, United States

- Location within Nevada

Highest point
- Elevation: 1,853 m (6,079 ft)

Geography
- Country: United States
- State: Nevada
- District: Washoe County
- Range coordinates: 41°27′23.631″N 119°21′53.714″W
- Topo map: USGS Yellow Hills East

The Yellow Hills are a mountain range in Washoe County, Nevada. They are located within the East Fork High Rock Canyon Wilderness.
