= High Rock Canyon Hills =

Mountain range in Nevada, United States

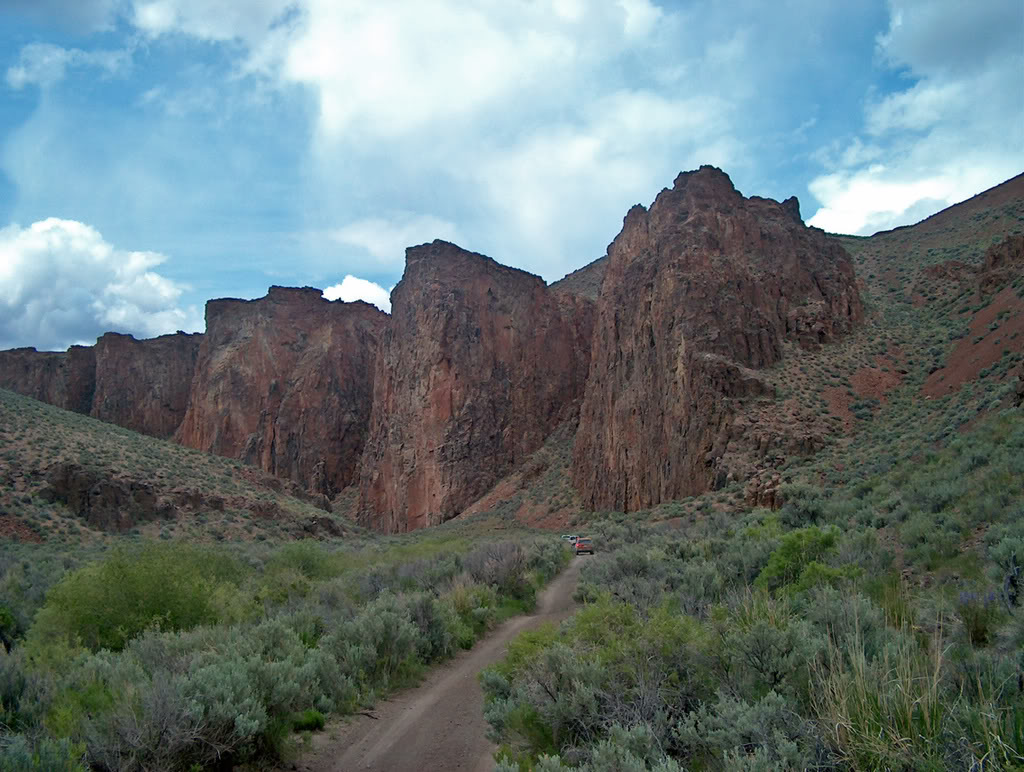
- High rock canyon

Highest point
- Elevation: 1,808 m (5,932 ft)
- Coordinates: 41°34′54″N 119°10′56″W

Geography
- Location within Nevada
- Country: United States
- State: Nevada
- District: Humboldt County
- Topo map: USGS Bear Buttes

The High Rock Canyon Hills is a mountain range in Humboldt County, Nevada.
