= Division Range =

Mountain range in Nevada, United States

- Location within Nevada

Highest point
- Elevation: 2,148 m (7,047 ft)

Geography
- Country: United States
- State: Nevada
- District: Humboldt County
- Range coordinates: 41°6′59.631″N 119°19′44.676″W
- Topo map: USGS Division Peak

The Division Range is a mountain range in Humboldt County, Nevada, United States.
