= Black Rock Hot Springs =

Hot spring

- Hondo Hot Springs
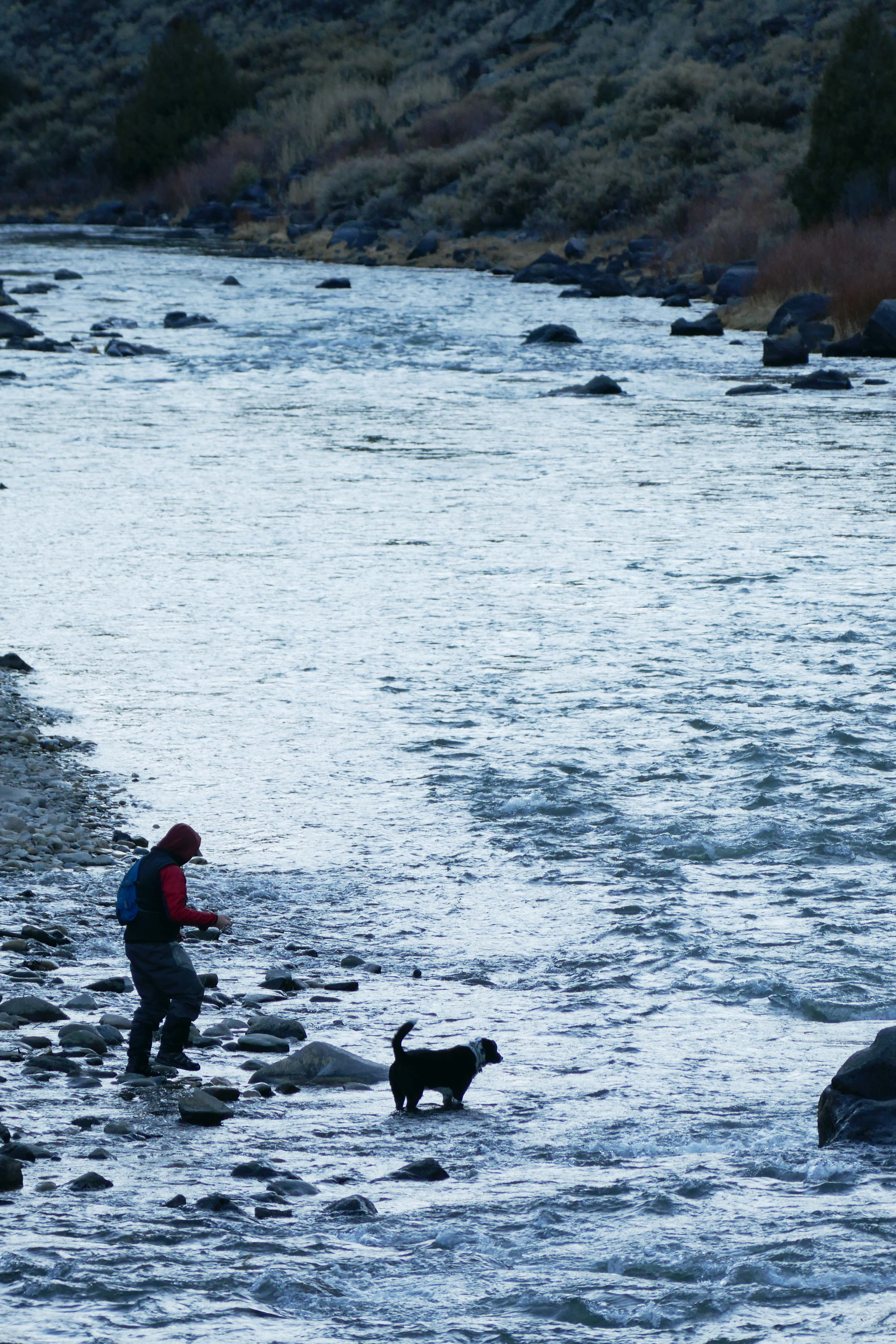
- Black Rock Hot Springs flooded out by the Rio Grande in December 2019
- Interactive map of Black Rock Hot Springs
- Location: near Arroyo Hondo, New Mexico
- Coordinates: 36°31′51″N 105°42′44″W
- Type: geothermal
- Temperature: 106 °F (41 °C)

Black Rock Hot Springs are a small system of thermal springs west of the town of Arroyo Hondo, New Mexico.

== Description ==
The hot spring water emerges from a group of basalt boulders next to the Rio Grandé, and are accessible when the river is low. The spring water collections in several small, primitive rock-lined soaking pools. The largest gravel-bottomed soaking pool is 4 feet deep and 12 feet in diameter. The soaking pools on occasion get washed out by the river. They have never been commercially developed.

== Water profile ==
The water temperature at the source is 106 °F. The temperature varies in the soaking pools where it can be mixed with river water. The largest soaking pool is approximately 98 °F.

== See also ==
- List of hot springs in the United States
