= North Black Rock Range Wilderness =

Wilderness area in Nevada, United States

North Black Rock Range
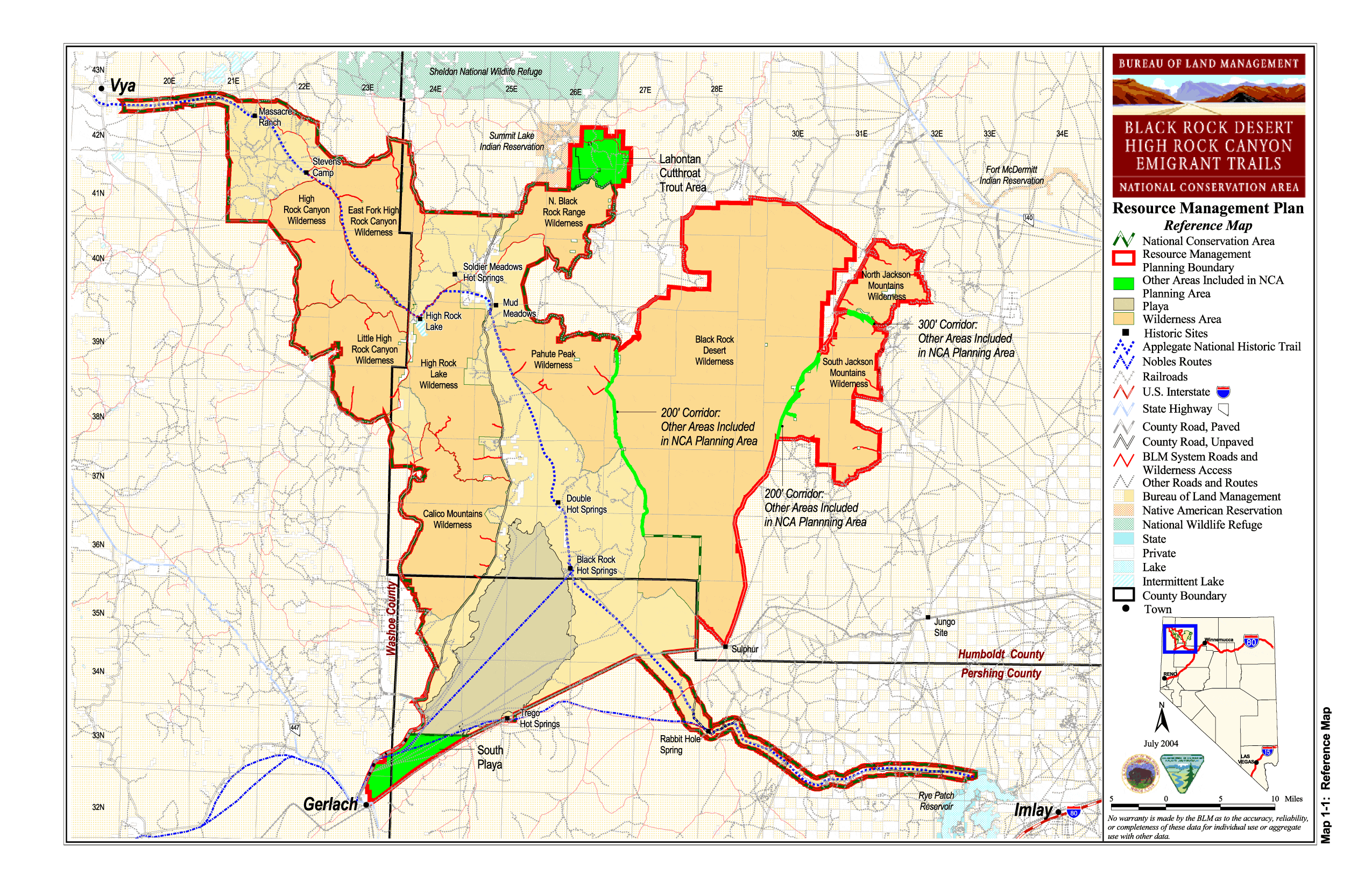
- BLM map of the Black Rock-High Rock NCA and 10 wilderness areas including North Black Rock Range Wilderness

- Location within Nevada
- Location: Black Rock Desert, Nevada, United States
- Coordinates: 41°26′15.634″N 119°2′20.665″W
- Elevation: 1,918 m (6,293 ft)
- Established: 2000
- Operator: Bureau of Land Management

The North Black Rock Range Wilderness is a U S Wilderness Area in Nevada under the Bureau of Land Management. It is located northeast of Soldier Meadows and south of the Summit Lake Indian Reservation.

== See also ==
- Black Rock Desert-High Rock Canyon Emigrant Trails National Conservation Area
