= Black Rock Desert–High Rock Canyon Emigrant Trails National Conservation Area =

National protected area in northwestern Nevada

Black Rock Desert–High Rock Canyon Emigrant Trails
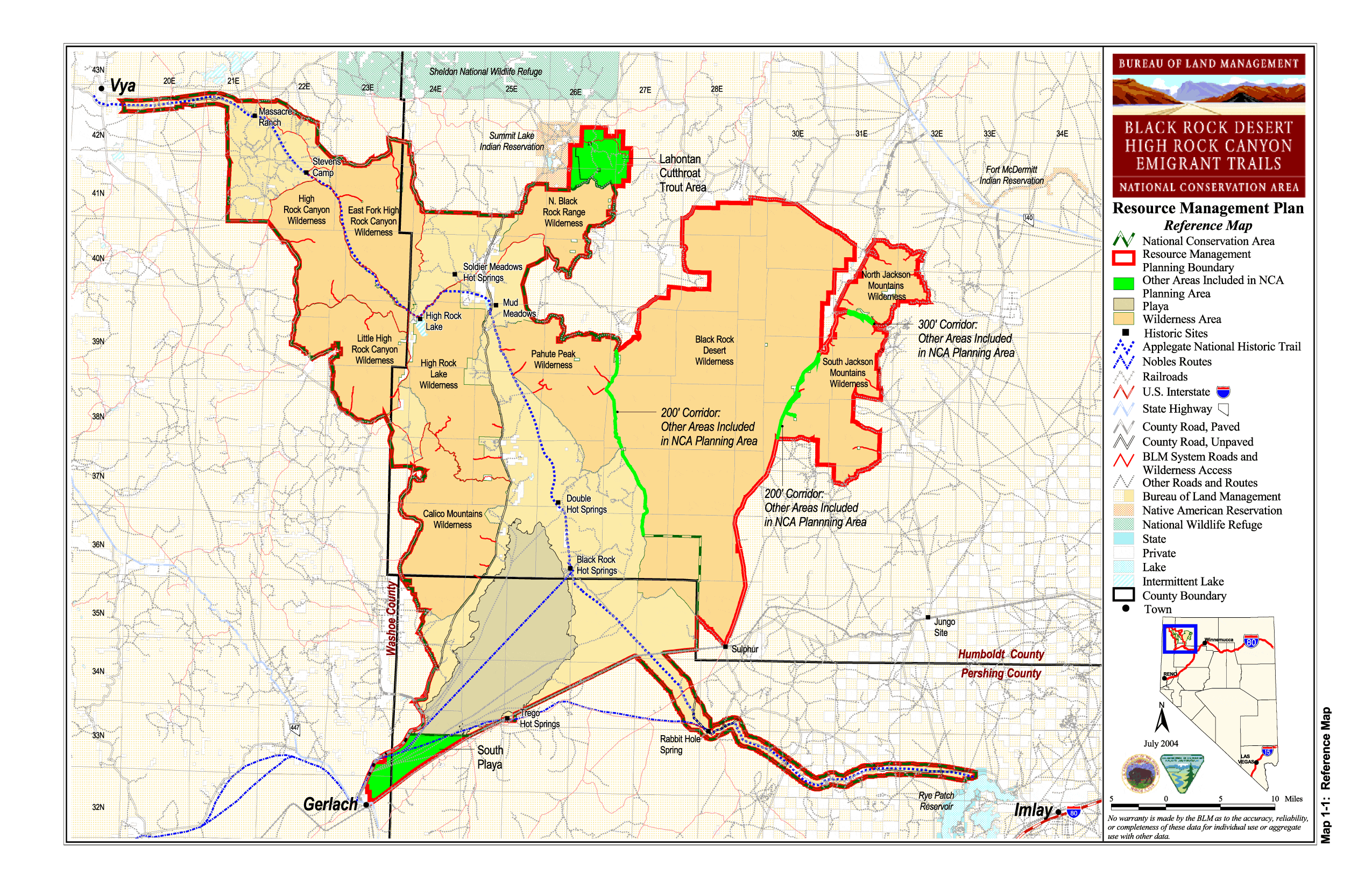
- BLM map of the Black Rock–High Rock NCA and its 10 Wilderness Areas

- Location within Nevada
- Location: Black Rock Desert-Great Basin, Nevada, United States
- Coordinates: 40°54′38.64″N 119°3′21.64″W
- Area: 1,245.46 sq mi (3,225.7 km^{2})
- Established: 2000
- Operator: Bureau of Land Management
- Website: BLM: Black Rock–High Rock NCA

The Black Rock Desert–High Rock Canyon Emigrant Trails National Conservation Area is the federal land in northwestern Nevada, under the Bureau of Land Management-BLM management and protection, and the ten Wilderness Areas within it.

The long name has led people to often shorten it to the Black Rock–High Rock NCA, when not needing the official name. The protected areas were created by the Black Rock Desert–High Rock Canyon Emigrant Trails National Conservation Area Act of 2000.

== Recreation ==
The Black Rock–High Rock Conservation Area allows recreational uses, and motorized vehicle travel on trails and playas only, while managing the area to preserve the natural habitats, historic emigrant trails, and the natural landmarks of the Black Rock Desert and High Rock Canyon. Many activities, such as with a large group of people, require a BLM permit. Motorized vehicle travel is not permitted in the Wilderness Areas, to protect the animals and plant communities within them. Walking and hiking are encouraged.

=== Information ===
The BLM office has online and printed maps and information, with the boundaries and features of the Black Rock–High Rock NCA and of the locations of the ten designated National Wilderness Preservation Areas located within the NCA. There are the BLM Winnemucca office in Winnemucca, Nevada and the BLM Surprise Valley office in Cedarville, California. Information is also available from The Friends of Black Rock High Rock, a 501(c)(3) organization, which helps manage the resources of the Black Rock Desert and High Rock regions, educates the public to foster stewardship and preserve its unique character, and sponsors events to enjoy it.

== Wilderness areas ==
The National Wilderness Preservation Areas in the Black Rock Desert – High Rock Canyon Emigrant Trails National Conservation Area include:

- Calico Mountains Wilderness
- Black Rock Desert Wilderness
- East Fork High Rock Canyon Wilderness
- High Rock Canyon Wilderness
- High Rock Lake Wilderness
- Little High Rock Canyon Wilderness
- North Black Rock Range Wilderness
- North Jackson Mountains Wilderness
- Pahute Peak Wilderness
- South Jackson Mountains Wilderness

== See also ==
- Applegate Trail
- Black Rock Desert
- List of wilderness areas in Nevada
