= Hannan Range =

Mountain range in Nevada, United States

- Location within Nevada

Highest point
- Elevation: 2,109 m (6,919 ft)

Geography
- Country: United States
- State: Nevada
- District: Pershing County
- Range coordinates: 40°33′10.649″N 118°57′56.614″W
- Topo map: USGS Dead Horse Canyon

The Hannan Range is a mountain range in Pershing County, Nevada.
