= Smoke Creek Desert =

Desert in northwestern Nevada

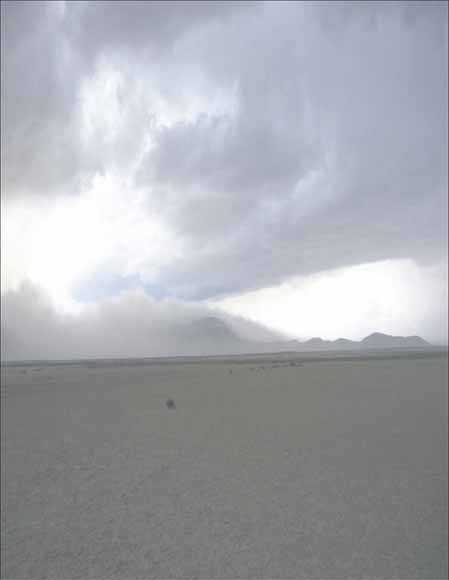
- Smoke Creek Desert

- Location within Nevada
- Floor elevation: 3,852 ft (1,174 m)

Geography
- Country: United States
- State: Nevada
- District: Washoe County
- Coordinates: 40.4890693°N 119.7307546°W
- Interactive map of Smoke Creek Desert

The Smoke Creek Desert is an arid region of northwestern Nevada, that lies about 60 miles (97 km) to the north of Pyramid Lake, west of the Fox Range and east of the Smoke Creek Mountains. The southern end of the desert lies on the Pyramid Lake Indian Reservation, and a rail line lies at the eastern edge. The Smoke Creek Desert is southwest of the Black Rock Desert's South Playa and is between the Granite Range and the Fox Range.

== Naming history ==
The original Smoke Creek Desert is shown on John Charles Frémont's map of the area during his 1843-44 expedition as a lake west of "Mud Lake", which was an early name for the Black Rock Desert. The Smoke Creek Desert appeared on maps as "Mud Lake" up through maps as late as the 1920s though by that time its name had been standardized as "The Smoke Creek Desert". The other major name for the desert which has been shown on many maps starting in the early 1850s is "Alkali Lake". Helen S. Carlson states that the name "Smoke Creek" has been found on a map from 1854.

There is controversy as to the origin of the name "Smoke Creek". Some believe it to be named after the Smoke Creek, a creek which lies along the Western edge of the basin and flows Eastward from near the California-Nevada border into the Smoke Creek basin. It was along this route that the Lassen and Nobels Trails were explored from the Honey Lake Valley (Susanville, California area) Eastward, eventually following along the Smoke Creek to the basin now called "Smoke Creek Desert". Other history says that it was named variously for the appearance of the basin to fill in the colder months with steam from the hot springs, or show columns of 'smoke' (water vapor) from the individual hot springs as they rose into the cold clear air of the valley. Alternately it is said that the name comes from the dust and 'dust devils' which the wind would pick up during the hot summer months and make the basin appear as though it was filled with 'smoke'.

== Railroad ==
The Railroad line on the eastern edge was originally shown on a map of 1876[5] as being on the right of way of the Southern Pacific Railroad, though on an 1877[6] map is shown as being constructed by the Western Pacific Railroad Company.
