= Smoke Creek Mountains =

Mountain range in Nevada, United States

- Location within Nevada

Highest point
- Elevation: 1,586 m (5,203 ft)

Geography
- Country: United States
- State: Nevada
- District: Washoe County
- Range coordinates: 40°22′19.651″N 119°57′55.740″W
- Topo map: USGS Parker Canyon

The Smoke Creek Mountains is a mountain range in Washoe County, Nevada, at the California border, west of the Smoke Creek Desert.
