= Sentinel Hills =

Mountain range in Nevada, United States

- Location within Nevada

Highest point
- Elevation: 1,566 m (5,138 ft)

Geography
- Country: United States
- State: Nevada
- District: Humboldt County
- Range coordinates: 41°49′23.616″N 117°51′47.523″W
- Topo map: USGS Hoppin Peaks

The Sentinel Hills are a mountain range in Humboldt County, Nevada.
