= Kamma Mountains =

Mountain range in Nevada, United States

- Location within Nevada

Highest point
- Elevation: 1,892 m (6,207 ft)

Geography
- Country: United States
- State: Nevada
- Region: Black Rock Desert
- District(s): Pershing County / Humboldt County
- Range coordinates: 40°46′14.646″N 118°39′53.578″W
- Topo map: USGS Sulphur

The Kamma Mountains are a mountain range in Pershing County and Humboldt County, Nevada. The ghost town and railroad siding at Sulphur, Nevada is on the west side of the Kamma Mountains at the eastern edge of the Black Rock Desert playa.

The Kamma Mountains are the site of Nevada's Sulphur Mining District. Allied Nevada Gold Corporation operates the Hycroft Gold Mine, a strip mine in the Kamma Mountains. Allied Nevada re-opened the mine in 2008 after acquiring it from Vista Gold Corporation.

Jungo Road (State Route 49) connects east through the Kamma Mountains to Winnemucca and south to Gerlach via Sulphur.
