= Hog Ranch Mountains =

Mountain range in Nevada, United States

- Location within Nevada

Highest point
- Elevation: 7,290 ft (2,220 m)
- Coordinates: 41°03′56″N 119°25′04″W

Geography
- Country: United States
- State: Nevada
- County: Washoe County
- Topo map: USGS Leadville

The Hog Ranch Mountains are a mountain range in Washoe County, Nevada.
