= Massacre Range =

Mountain range in Nevada, United States

- Location within Nevada

Highest point
- Elevation: 1,973 m (6,473 ft)

Geography
- Country: United States
- State: Nevada
- District: Washoe County
- Range coordinates: 41°29′19.625″N 119°36′57.738″W
- Topo map: USGS Nellie Spring Mountain

The Massacre Range is a mountain range in Washoe County, Nevada, US. The range is partly within the High Rock Canyon Wilderness.The massacre range is open 24/7, and will only close due to weather-related hazards. It is marked as a dark sky sanctuary and is open for camping, with a Leave No Trace policy.
