= East Fork High Rock Canyon Wilderness =

Wilderness area in Nevada, United States

East Fork High Rock Canyon
- IUCN category Ib (wilderness area)
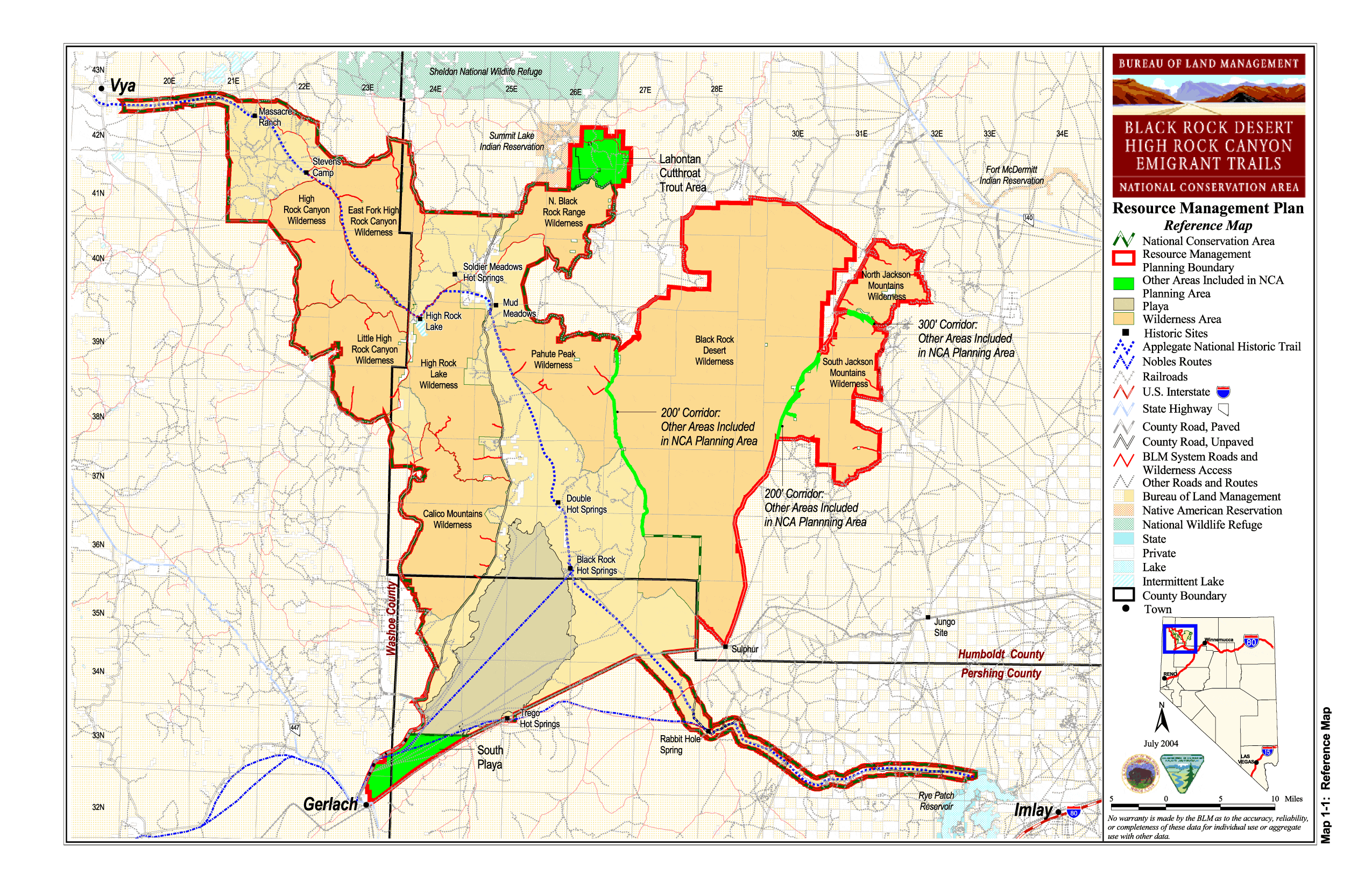
- BLM map of the Black Rock-High Rock NCA and 10 wilderness areas including East Fork High Rock Canyon Wilderness

- Location within Nevada Location within the United States
- Location: Black Rock Desert, Nevada, United States
- Coordinates: 41°25′55.631″N 119°21′21.710″W
- Elevation: 1,738 m (5,702 ft)
- Established: 2000
- Operator: Bureau of Land Management

The East Fork High Rock Canyon Wilderness is a U S Wilderness Area in Nevada under the Bureau of Land Management. It is located on the northeast side of High Rock Canyon but does not include the 4x4 trail inside High Rock Canyon nor a 4x4 trail to the Yellow Hills.

== See also ==
- Black Rock Desert-High Rock Canyon Emigrant Trails National Conservation Area
