= Little High Rock Mountains =

Mountain range in Nevada, United States

- Location within Nevada

Highest point
- Elevation: 2,080 m (6,820 ft)

Geography
- Country: United States
- State: Nevada
- District: Washoe County
- Range coordinates: 41°18′13.627″N 119°29′1.710″W
- Topo map: USGS Mahogany Mountain

The Little High Rock Mountains is a mountain range in Washoe County, Nevada.
