= Granite Range (Washoe County) =

Mountain range in Nevada, United States

- Location within Nevada

Highest point
- Elevation: 2,365 m (7,759 ft)

Geography
- Country: United States
- State: Nevada
- Region: Black Rock Desert
- District: Washoe County
- Range coordinates: 40°44′28.644″N 119°23′45.677″W
- Topo map: USGS Godeys Rock

The Granite Range is a mountain range in Washoe County, Nevada, west of the town of Gerlach and the lower Black Rock Desert playa.

Adjacent mountain ranges are the Fox Range and Calico Hills. Smoke Creek Desert is also near.
