= Sheephead Mountains =

Mountain range in Nevada, United States

- Location within Nevada

Highest point
- Elevation: 1,750 m (5,740 ft)

Geography
- Country: United States
- State: Nevada
- District: Pershing County
- Range coordinates: 40°38′0.647″N 118°57′18.615″W
- Topo map: USGS Sheep Spring

The Sheephead Mountains are a mountain range in Pershing County, Nevada, United States.

The Sheephead mountains have a peak of 5,896 feet, and are considered to be brushland ecosystems.
