= Poker Brown Mountains =

Mountain range in Pershing County, Nevada, US

- Location within Nevada

Highest point
- Elevation: 1,685 m (5,528 ft)

Geography
- Country: United States
- State: Nevada
- District: Pershing County
- Range coordinates: 40°33′23.655″N 118°35′49.561″W
- Topo map: USGS Poker Brown Gap

The Poker Brown Mountains are a mountain range in Pershing County, Nevada.
