= Black Rock Range =

Mountain range in Nevada, United States

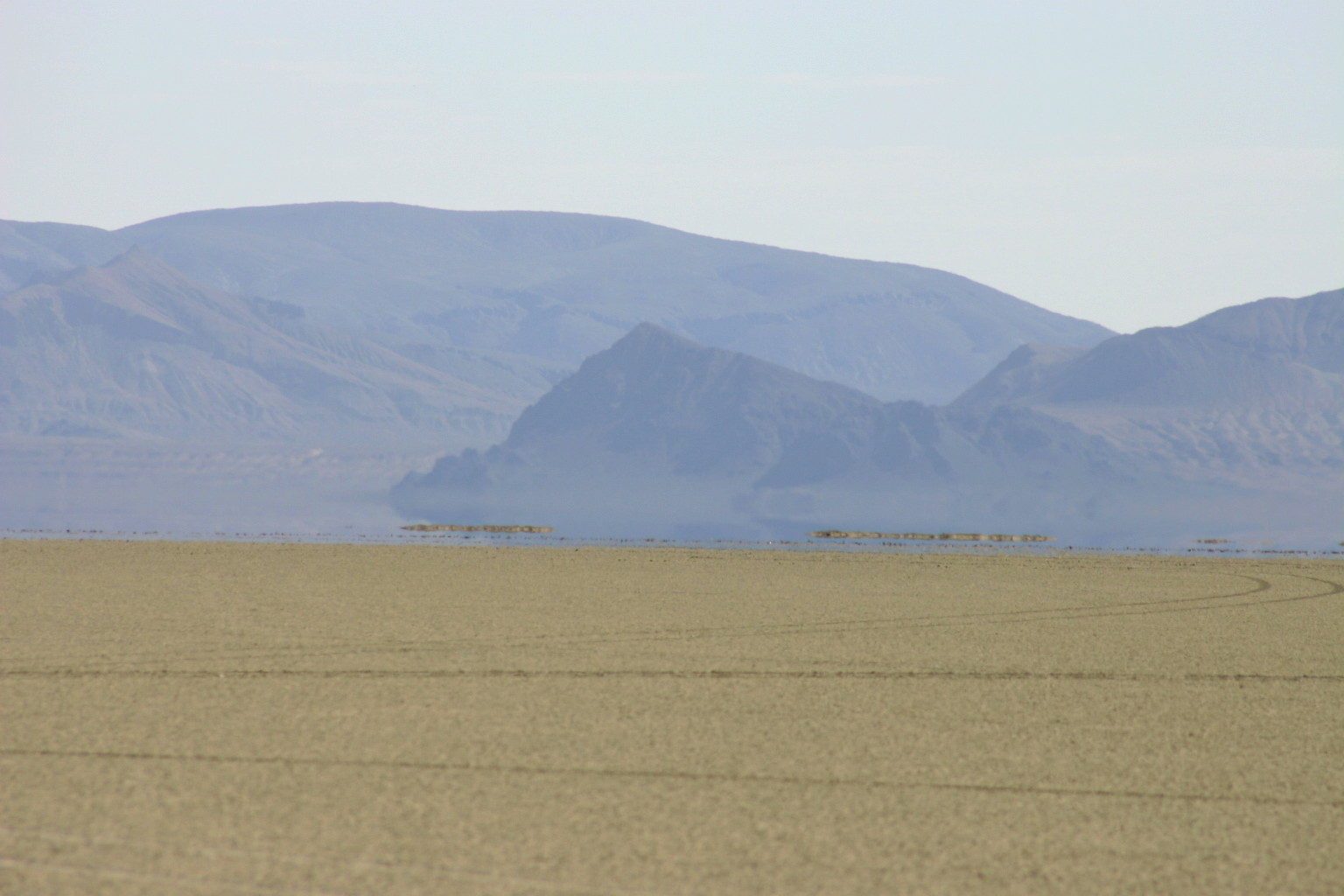
- Black Rock Point and the Black Rock Range

Highest point
- Peak: Pahute Peak/Big Mountain
- Elevation: 8,566 ft (2,611 m)

Geography
- Location within Nevada
- Country: United States
- State: Nevada
- Region: Black Rock Desert
- County: Humboldt County
- Range coordinates: 41°16′47.63″N 119°3′37.65″W

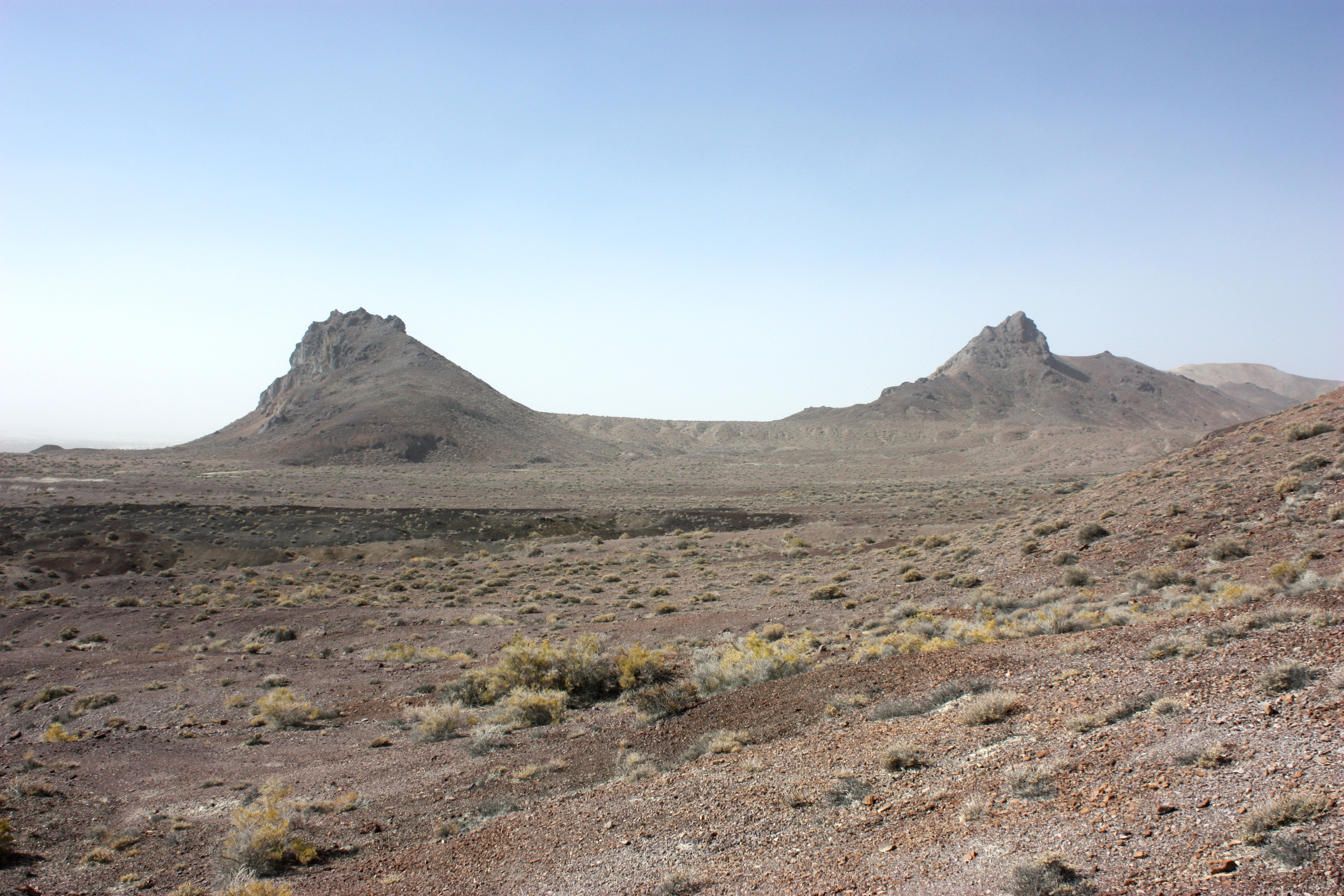
Southern Black Rock Range

The Black Rock Range is a mountain range in northwestern Nevada. It is named for Black Rock Point, which is located at the southern end of the range. The Black Rock Range divides the Black Rock Desert into eastern and western arms. Pahute Peak, also known as Big Mountain, is the highest point in the range at 8,566 feet (2,611 m) above sea level.

The majority of the range is part of the Black Rock Desert-High Rock Canyon Emigrant Trails National Conservation Area. In addition two separate federally designated wilderness areas are part of the Black Rock Range. Those wilderness areas are Pahute Peak Wilderness and the North Black Rock Range Wilderness.

In December 2009, the Bureau of Land Management announced a roundup of 2500 wild horses out of an estimated population of 3000 in the Black Rock Range and vicinity, due to overpopulation.
