= Sulphur, Nevada =

- Ghost town
- Location within Nevada Location within the United States
- Country: United States
- State: Nevada
- County: Humboldt
- Named for: Humboldt National Forest
- Elevation: 6,100 ft (1,860 m)

Sulphur is a ghost town in Humboldt County, Nevada that was a Feather River Route station in the Black Rock Desert along the Kamma Mountains.

== History ==
A post office was in operation at Sulphur intermittently between 1899 and 1953. The community was named for deposits of sulphur near the original town site.

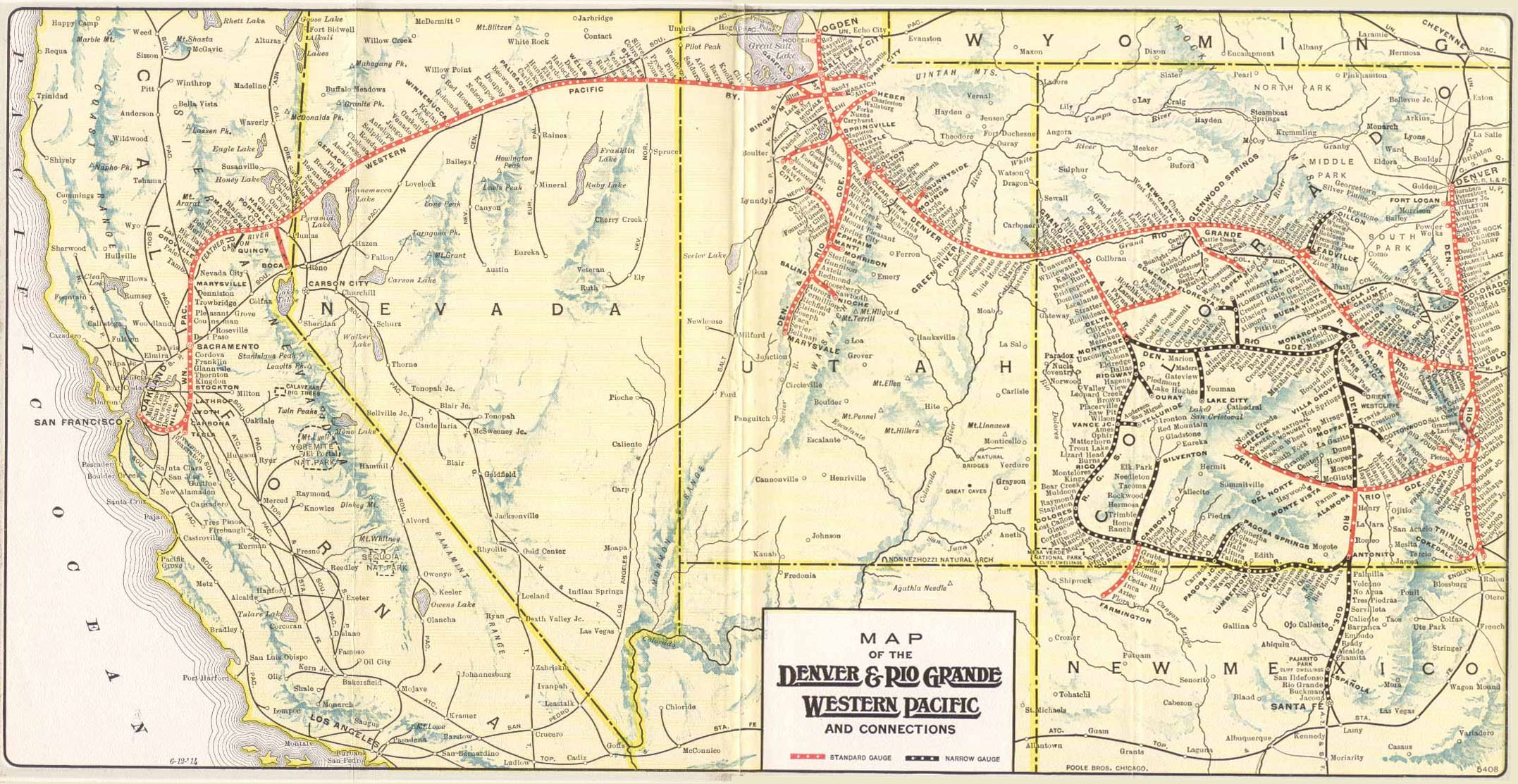
1914 WPRR map with Gerlach, Ascalon, Trego, Cholona, Ronda, and Sulphur.
