= Calico Mountains =

Calico Mountains may refer to:

- Calico Mountains (California)
- Calico Mountains (Nevada)
- Calico Mountains Wilderness in Nevada
