= Mary Jo Estep =

Shoshone child survivor of "the last massacre" of Native Americans in the US

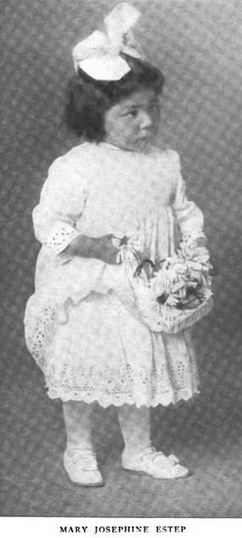
Mary Jo Estep, about five years after surviving the Battle of Kelley Creek; from a 1916 publication.

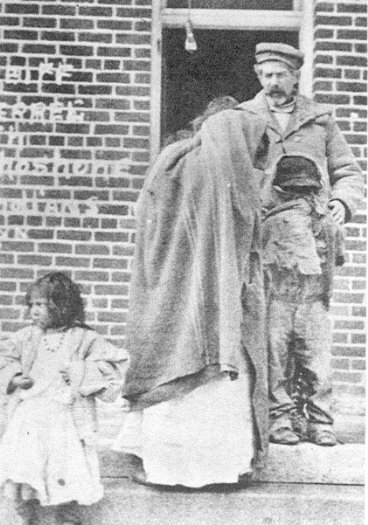
Sherriff Charles Ferrel and the other three survivors of the Battle of Kelley Creek, Daggett's daughter Heney (Louise, 17), and two of his grandchildren, Cleveland (Mosho, 8), Hattie (Harriet Mosho, 4).

Mary Josephine Estep (1909 or 1910 — 19 December 1992) was a Shoshone child survivor of the Battle of Kelley Creek, "the last massacre" of Native Americans in the United States, in 1911.

== Early life ==
Mary Josephine Estep was born in 1909 or 1910, to Wenega Daggett. Her grandfather was Mike Daggett, also known as "Shoshone Mike" after his death.

She was a little more than a year old when her mother was killed near Winnemucca, Nevada. In February 1911 Mike Daggett and band killed four White stockmen at Little High Rock Canyon in northern Washoe County. A posse responded by confronting the twelve members of the Daggett band at Kelley Creek. Four children, including Estep, survived the subsequent shootout, and were taken to the jail in Reno for protection. Only Estep was still alive by 1913. (The other three had died of diseases.)

== Adoption ==
Estep, who was found to have tuberculosis after the massacre, was adopted by Maj. Evan W. Estep and his wife, Orrell Marietta "Rita" Garrison Estep. Maj. Estep was the white superintendent of the Fort Hall Indian Reservation in Idaho. She lived with her adoptive parents in Montana and New Mexico before landing at the Yakama Indian Reservation in Toppenish, Washington in 1924, and finally in Yakima, Washington in 1930, after Evan Estep's retirement. Evan died in 1950, and Rita died in 1955.

== Later life ==
Mary Jo Estep studied music and attended Central Washington University. She was an elementary school music teacher for about forty years, before her retirement in 1974. Mary Jo Estep learned the details of her origins in 1975, when a woman read Dayton Hyde's book The Last Free Man about Mike Daggett's story, realized that she went to school with Estep and recalled that Estep's parents were killed in a massacre. Hyde then sought Estep out, finding her in Yakima. She died in 1992, aged about 82 years, in Yakima, after she was given the wrong medication in a nursing home.
