= Estep =

Estep is a surname. Notable people with the surname include:

- Harry Allison Estep (1884–1968), American politician
- Maggie Estep (1963–2014), American poet and writer
- Mary Jo Estep (1909/10–1992), Shoshone child survivor of the Battle of Kelley Creek
- Preston Estep (born 1960), American biologist
- William Roscoe Estep (1920–2000), American Baptist historian and professor
