= Dayton Hyde =

American writer

Dayton O. Hyde
- Born: Dayton Ogden Hyde; March 25, 1925; Marquette, Michigan, U.S.
- Died: December 22, 2018 (aged 93); Chiloquin, Oregon, U.S.
- Occupation: Author

Dayton Ogden Hyde (March 25, 1925 – December 22, 2018) was an American expository author and proponent of nature conservation.

Most of his books take place in rural, agricultural settings where he spent the majority of his life. His books advocate an environmentally responsible philosophy of land management. For example, he encourages the use of wild coyotes, rather than toxic chemicals, to control mouse populations.

He was born in Marquette, Michigan, in 1925. At age 13, he began working on his uncle's ranch in Oregon, then moving on to the Cate School in Carpinteria, California, graduating with the class of 1943. He fought in the Army in World War II in the European campaign. After attending the University of California, Berkeley, majoring in English, he continued work on his uncle's ranch before marrying and starting his own ranch. The couple raised five children there. In the 1950s, one of his photographs of rodeo cowboys was chosen as the Life magazine Picture of the Week.

In 1990, he moved to the Black Hills of South Dakota, where, in addition to writing, he operated an 11,000-acre (4,500 ha) sanctuary for wild horses. Running Wild: The Life of Dayton O. Hyde, a documentary released in 2013, tells the story of his efforts to protect wild horses in the American West. Hyde died in December 2018 at the age of 93 in Chiloquin, Oregon.

== Notable books ==
- Home
- Sandy
- Yamsi
- Pasture of Beyond
- Don Coyote
- The Major, the Poacher
- Island of the Loons
- The Bells of Lake Superior
- Mr. Beans
- Life in the Saddle
- Wild Horses
- Where Horses Run Free
- Tributes
- Strange Companion
- The Last Free Man (Story of Mike Daggett and the Battle of Kelley Creek February 26, 1911)
