= Harnar =

Harnar is a surname. Notable people with the surname include:

- Jeff Harnar (fl. 1987), American singer
- Nellie Shaw Harnar (1905–1985), American historian and educator
