= Alida Bowler =

American social worker and educator (1887–1968)

- Born: November 29, 1887; Moro, Illinois, United States
- Died: May 17, 1968 (aged 80); Riverside, California, United States
- Burial place: Forest Lawn Memorial Park, Glendale, California, United States
- Education: University of Illinois Urbana-Champaign
- Occupations: Social worker, educator and advocate of Indigenous Americans rights
- Employer(s): Ohio State University; Red Cross; American Indian Defense Association; Los Angeles Police Department; United States Children's Bureau; Stewart Indian School

Alida Cynthia Bowler (November 29, 1887 – May 17, 1968) was an American social worker and educator who advocated for Indigenous Americans in Nevada. She worked for the Red Cross, the American Indian Defense Association, the United States Children's Bureau, and at educational institutions. She also became the first female superintendent at a Native American boarding school, when she was appointed to Stewart Indian School in 1934.

== Early life and education ==
Bowler was born on November 29, 1887, in Moro, Illinois, United States.

Bowler studied psychology at the University of Illinois Urbana-Champaign, graduating with her masters degree in 1911. As a student, Bowler was a May Day folk dancer and member of the Classical Club, Kappa Alpha Theta, Phi Delta Psi and Phi Beta Kappa.

== Career ==
After graduating, Bowler worked as high school English teacher in Alton, Illinois, then was a psychology instructor who gave the Vrooman tests at Ohio State University in Columbus, Ohio. She also contributed to research which was published in The American Journal of Psychology and to a study of the Ohio State School for the Blind.

During World War I, Bowler served in France with the Red Cross. After the Armistice was signed in 1918, ending the war, she was transferred to Romania where she worked supporting and resettling refugees fleeing from Odesa.

Bowler returned to the United States in September 1919. She continued to work for the Red Cross in Seattle, Washington. She then worked for five years as executive secretary of the San Francisco office of the American Indian Defense Association (AIDA), alongside John C. Collier. She engaged in social work and worked with the United States Interdepartmental Hygiene Board.

In 1929, Bowler was appointed as temporary and emergency president of the Bureau of Public Relations by the Chief of the Los Angeles Police Department (LAPD) in Los Angeles, California, following the death of Ralph S. Boyesen who had previously held the role.

In the early 1930s, Bowler worked as director of the delinquency division of the United States Children’s Bureau. With Ruth Bloodgood, she undertook research studies on juvenile delinquency and state children’s facilities.

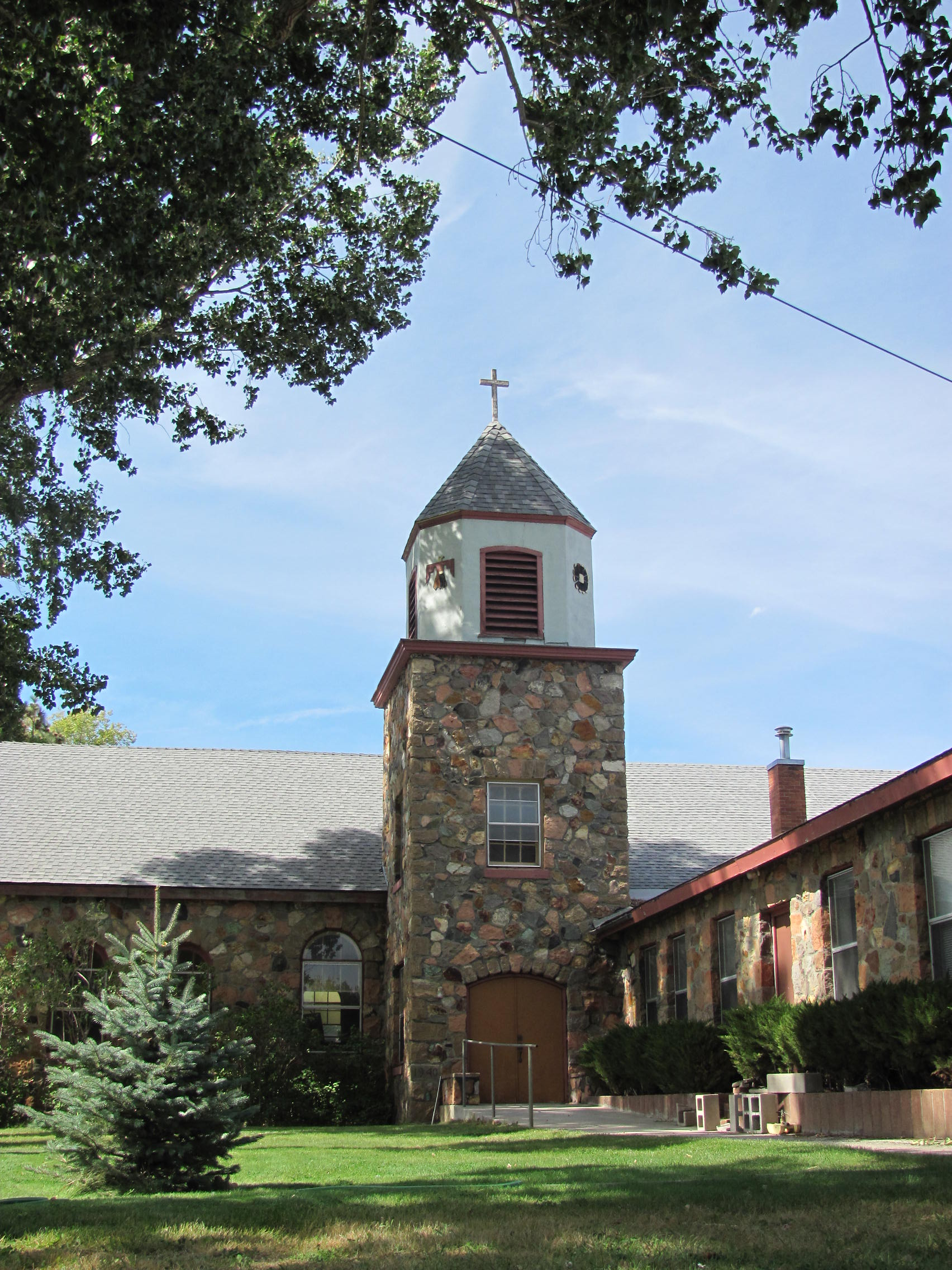
Stewart Indian School grounds

On September 1, 1934, Bowler became the first female superintendent at an "Indian" boarding school, working for the rural Carson Indian Agency in Nevada at the boarding Stewart Indian School. Her appointment was reported on by The New York Times. Bowler was appointed after the Indian Reorganization Act (1934) was passed, which ended previous policies eradicating tribal culture and working towards the cultural assimilation of Native Americans. She also served as Indian Agent for most of Nevada, and worked to empower tribal councils and Native American self-determination.

While in post, Bowler supported girls organising themselves into sewing clubs. In 1936, she opened the Wa-Pai-Shone Craft Cooperative and Trading Post, which sold buckskin and beaded artworks and other craft items made by female school students. The students received the proceeds from the sales. The name Wa-Pai-Shone was a portmanteau to recognize the names of the three tribal nations (Washoe, Paiute and Shoshone) that were represented in the school body.

While working in Nevada, Bowler reflected that:

"The Indian in Nevada…is still discriminated against socially and exploited economically. He is primarily the under-paid agricultural season laborer upon whom the big cattle and sheep interests depend for cheap labor at certain seasons…He lives on a substandard level, and his smug white employer asserts that the Indian is perfectly content at the level and neither desires nor deserves a hand up."

In 1939, Bowler publicly supported the Pyramid Lake Paiute tribal nation and their efforts to maintain sovereignty and evict white settlers irrigation works from the Truckee River. In response, the Office of Indian Affairs (OA) removed Bowler from her position as superintendent for the Carson Indian Agency. Three councils of tribal leaders sent letters to the OA protesting her removal, including the Walker River Paiute tribal nation of Nevada, but Bowler was still replaced.

Before leaving her position she said that:

"I do deeply regret having to leave Nevada. I have fallen in love with the State–its beauty, its climate, and its people—especially the Indian people. The work in the Carson Indian Agency for the past five years has given me a greater and more genuine satisfaction than any of the things I have tackled in previous years…. I have been privileged to serve as their advisor and friend."

In 1948, Bowler worked as an Indian Service placement officer in California, supporting Navajo and Hopi people to find off-reservation jobs through the Window Rock agency. She reported that veterans who "already know the ways of the "white man’s world"" had the easiest time adjusting to urban life.

== Death ==
Bowler died on May 17, 1968, in Riverside, California, United States, aged 80. She was buried at Forest Lawn Memorial Park in Glendale, California.
