= Twin Creeks gold mine =

Open pit mine near Winnemucca, Nevada, USA

Coordinates: 41.256°N 117.166°W

Twin Creeks gold mine, also known as Twin Creeks Mine, is an active open pit mine near Winnemucca, Nevada.

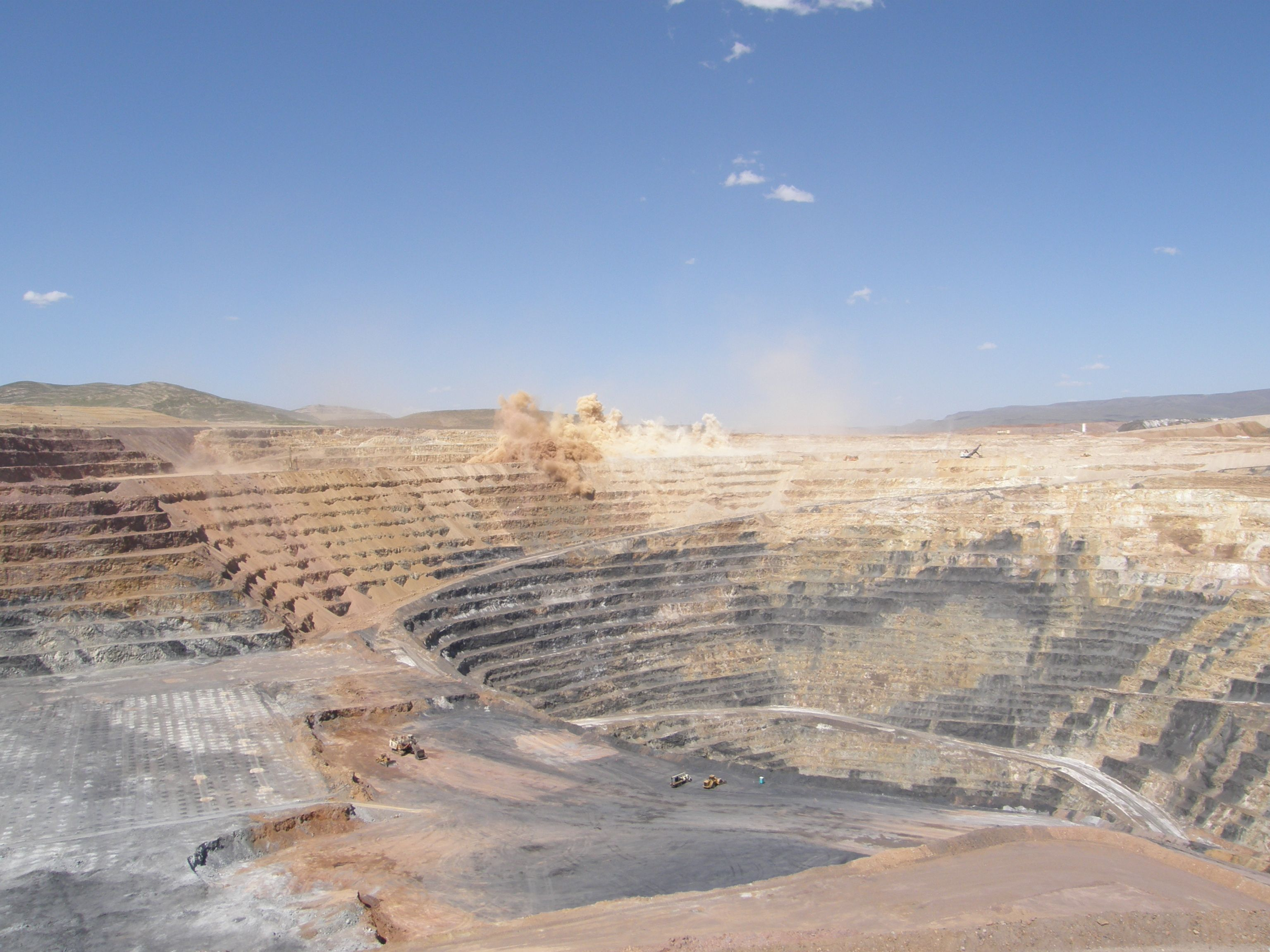
Rock blasting at the mine. Note the size of the excavators for scale (foreground, left), and that the bottom of the mine is not visible.

It is a gold and silver mine operated by Newmont. The Chimney Creek gold deposit, now part of Twin Creek, was first identified in the 1980s. A rare specimen of orpiment discovered in the mine was donated to the Smithsonian.

In 1911, the Battle of Kelley Creek occurred in the area. Eventually, a marker was placed just to the west of where the mine was later located. The 1996 environmental impact statement mentions a reconfiguration of an overburden and interburden site so as to avoid the location of the marker for the battle.

In 1993, the Twin Creeks mine was created as a combination of the Chimney Creek and Rabbit Creek mines during a coal-for-gold swap between Santa Fe Pacific and Hansen Natural Resources.
