= Mike Daggett =

Shoshone warrior

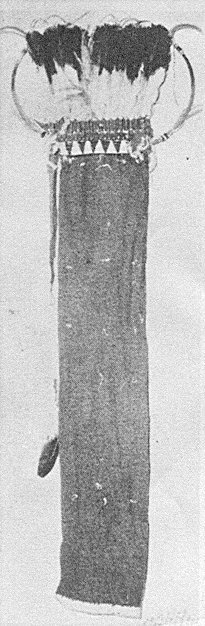
Mike Daggett's headdress, found at Kelley Creek in February 1911

Mike Daggett, original Shoshoni name Ondongarte (died February 25, 1911), was a Shoshone man who is best known for his involvement in the Battle of Kelley Creek, during which he was killed with several members of his family.

== Nicknames ==
Daggett was also known by many other names, including "Shoshone Mike" after his death, "Indian Mike," "Rock Creek Mike," and "Salmon River Mike."

== Background ==
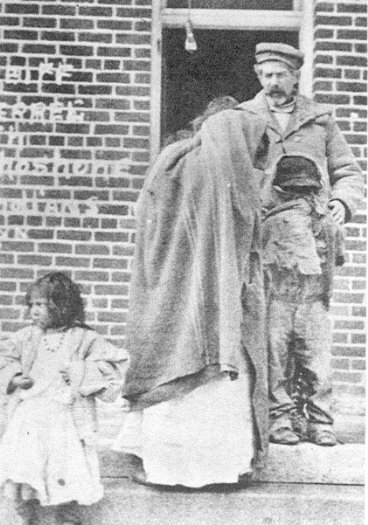
Sheriff Charles Ferrel with surviving members of Mike Daggett's family (Dagget's daughter Heney (Louise, 17), and two of his grandchildren, Hattie (Harriet Mosho, 4))(left) and Cleveland (Mosho, 8)[right]

Daggett was the father of 12 to 13 children. The earliest known written record of him was in 1890 when he and his family were removed from their lands on Fort Hall Indian Reservation in Idaho by settlers who claimed they had purchased the land. In the spring of 1910, Daggett led his family off the reservation and they traveled to Nevada and California where they worked at various jobs.

== Cattle theft ==
In January 1911, the Daggetts were encamped in Little High Rock Canyon in Washoe County, Nevada. Their winter stores were running low so Mike decided to steal and slaughter some cattle belonging to a local rancher.

== Death ==
The theft did not go unnoticed and a posse of four men went to the canyon to deal with the situation, but when the four entered, Mike and two of his oldest sons ambushed the posse and killed all of them on January 19. The bodies were later found mutilated and piled in a creek bed by a search party on February 8, after which a posse of Nevada and California policemen and citizens was sent to apprehend the Daggett party. On February 25, 1911, the posse discovered Mike Daggett and his followers at a place known as Kelley Creek in Humboldt County, Nevada. During a battle that lasted three hours, Mike was killed, along with seven others.

== Children and grandchildren ==
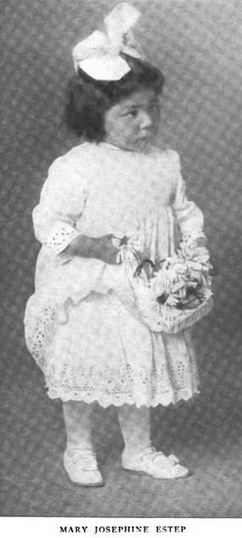
Daggett grandchild Mary Jo Estep {1909/1910-1992} age 5 in 1916

Four of Daggett's children were taken into police custody. They later attended Stewart Indian School near Carson City, Nevada, but three died because of illness. By 1913 only one, Daggett's baby granddaughter, was still alive, renamed Mary Jo Estep. She died in 1992.

== Burials ==
The remains of the dead were buried near Golconda, Nevada.

A March 3, 1919 letter from William Kent to Charles Doolittle Walcott discusses the skull of Mike Daggett stating: "I considered Big Mike's skull as a good game trophy, and therefore had it dug up and sent on. It will be deposited in New Haven." Kent was a member of the Skull and Bones secret student society at Yale University in New Haven. The second part of the letter is likely authored by Aleš Hrdlička and describes the Battle of Kelley Creek.

Eventually, the remains were donated by a local rancher to the Smithsonian Institution. In 1994 the remains were repatriated to the Fort Hall Idaho Shoshone-Bannock Tribe.
