= Wadsworth Union Church =

Historic church in Nevada, United States

- U.S. National Register of Historic Places
- Location within Nevada Location within the United States
- Location: Jct. of Lincoln Hwy and Railroad Ave., Wadsworth, Nevada
- Coordinates: 39°38′7″N 119°17′0″W
- Area: less than one acre
- Built: 1888
- Architectural style: Gothic
- NRHP reference No.: 04000298
- Added to NRHP: April 15, 2004

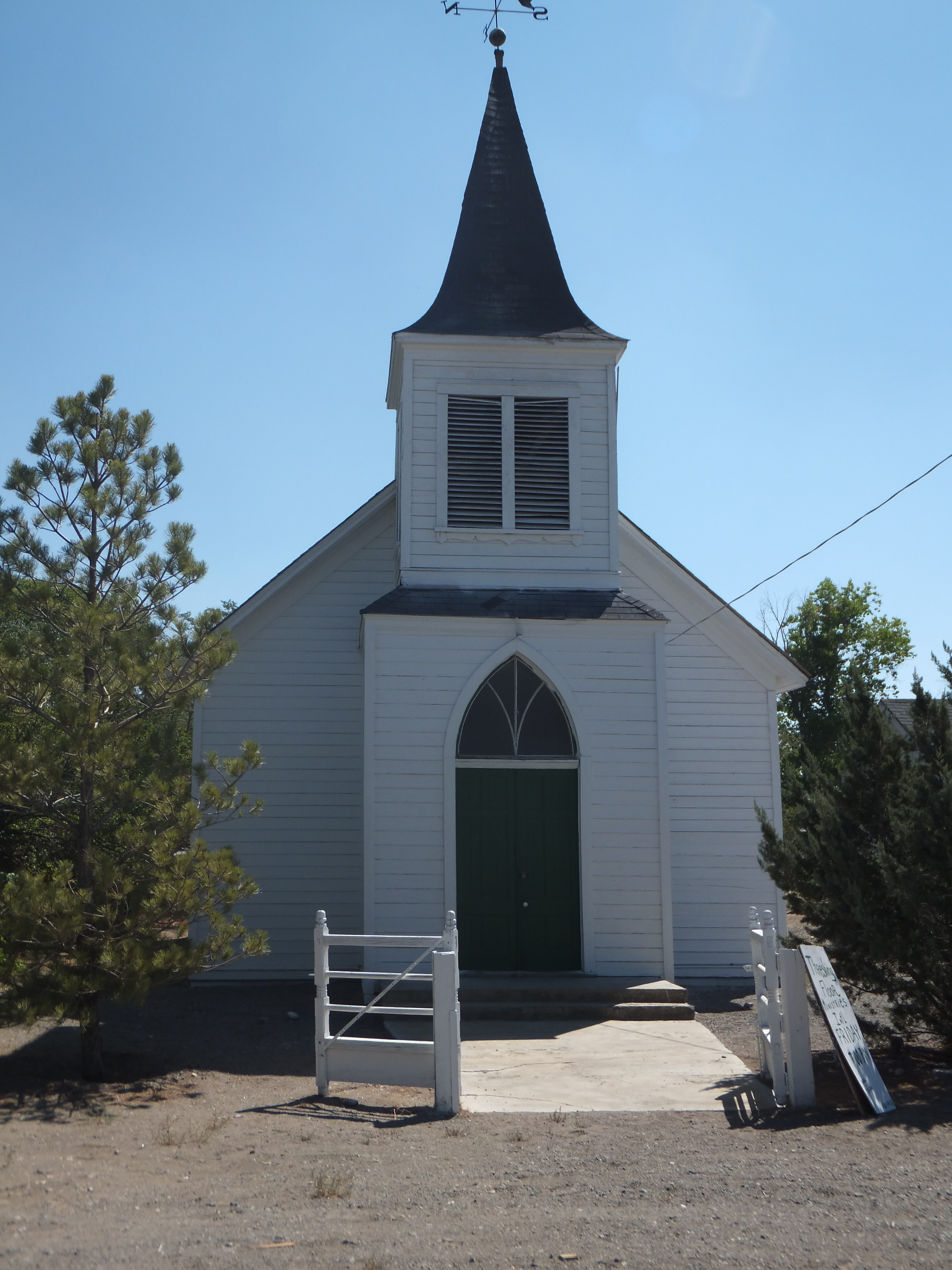

Wadsworth Union Church is a historic church at the junction of Lincoln Hwy and Railroad Avenue in Wadsworth, Nevada.

It was built in 1888 and added to the National Register of Historic Places in 2004.

It is a small church, just 1,120 square feet (104 m^{2}) in area. It was deemed significant "for its historical association with the general patterns of social life in the railroad town of Wadsworth, Nevada during the late nineteenth and early twentieth centuries."
