= Stewart Indian School =

Museum and historic school in Nevada

Coordinates: 39.116°N 119.757°W

- U.S. National Register of Historic Places
- U.S. Historic district
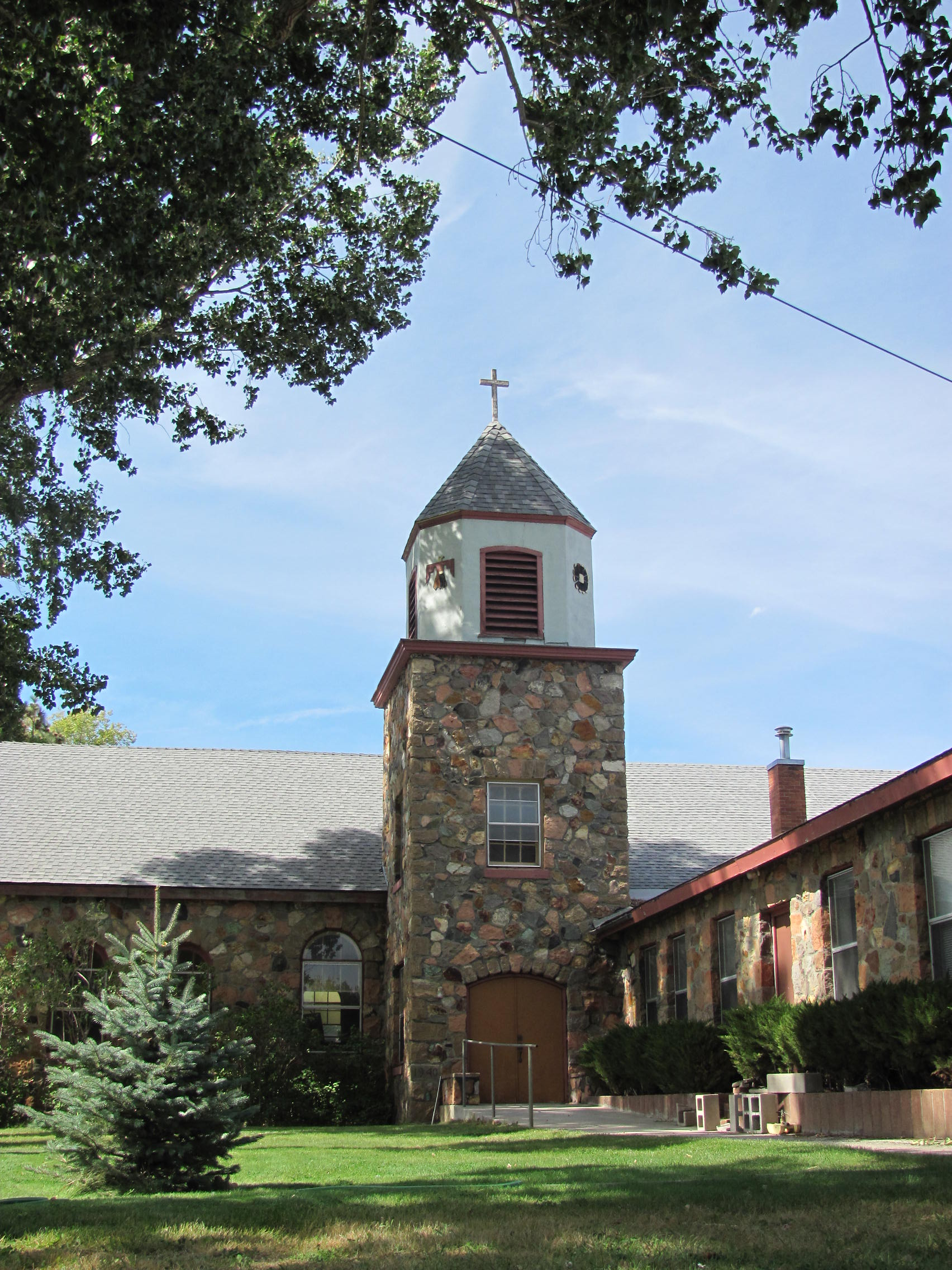
- Stewart Indian School campus

- Location within Nevada Location within the United States
- Location: South of Carson City off US 395, Carson City, Nevada
- Area: 109 acres (44 ha)
- Built: December 17, 1890
- Built by: Dept. of Interior Constr. Div.
- Architect: Frederick Snyder
- Architectural style: Colonial Revival
- Website: stewartindianschool.com
- NRHP reference No.: 85002432
- Added to NRHP: September 18, 1985

The Stewart Indian School (1890–1980) was an American Indian boarding school southeast of Carson City, Nevada. Today, it is the Stewart Indian School Cultural Center and Museum.

The school's 110-acre campus still holds 65 original buildings. The buildings are noted for the masonry work of colored local stone used by student apprentices to build the vernacular-style buildings. The school, part of the Native American boarding schools project, was the only off-reservation boarding school in Nevada. Funding for the school was obtained by Nevada's first (of two) United States Senator (1865-1875), and former California Attorney General, of William M. Stewart (1827-1909), shortly after the federal Nevada Territory (1861-1864) was admitted to the federal Union as the 36th state in 1864, during the American Civil War (1861-1865), and it was named in his honor when it first opened on December 17, 1890. It has also been known as the Stewart Institute, Carson Industrial School, and Carson Indian School during its 90 years history.

Native American children from Nevada and later throughout the West were forced to attend the Stewart Institute up to secondary school age. The initial intent of the school was to eliminate Indian language and culture from the children, to provide them with trade skills, and to make them fully American. Students during the early years were harshly disciplined and acted as unpaid labor to maintain the institution. The school struggled and some superintendents only lasted less than a year. In 1919, Frederick Snyder was put in charge and he turned the floundering school into an architectural and horticultural showplace. The children were prohibited until about 1934 by the school's then assimilation policies from using or learning about their native language and culture.

After the landmark policy-changing federal legislation of the Indian Reorganization Act (a.k.a. Wheeler-Howard Act) of 1934, passed by the United States Congress during the new presidential administration of 32nd President Franklin D. Roosevelt (1882-1945, served 1933-1945), then under the new changing philosophy and policies under the Democratic Party's more liberal and progressive attitudes with FDR's "New Deal" programs, Alida Cynthia Bowler became Director of the Carson Indian School and Reservations. She defended the Indians' interests against the federal government's and its Bureau of Indian Affairs ongoing occasional desire to usurp their ownership of land and supported retention of Indian culture among the students and their home tribes..

Finally almost a century later by 1980, the modern United States federal government under the presidential administration of Jimmy Carter (1924–2024, served 1977–1981), with continuing major policy and cultural attitudes changing in majority white / caucasian European American society, the Carter administration cut funding nationwide for Indian boarding schools and closed the Stewart School of Carson City campus. During its 90 years of history, about 30,000 native American students are believed to have attended the school in Nevada.

== Trade skills and forced assimilation ==
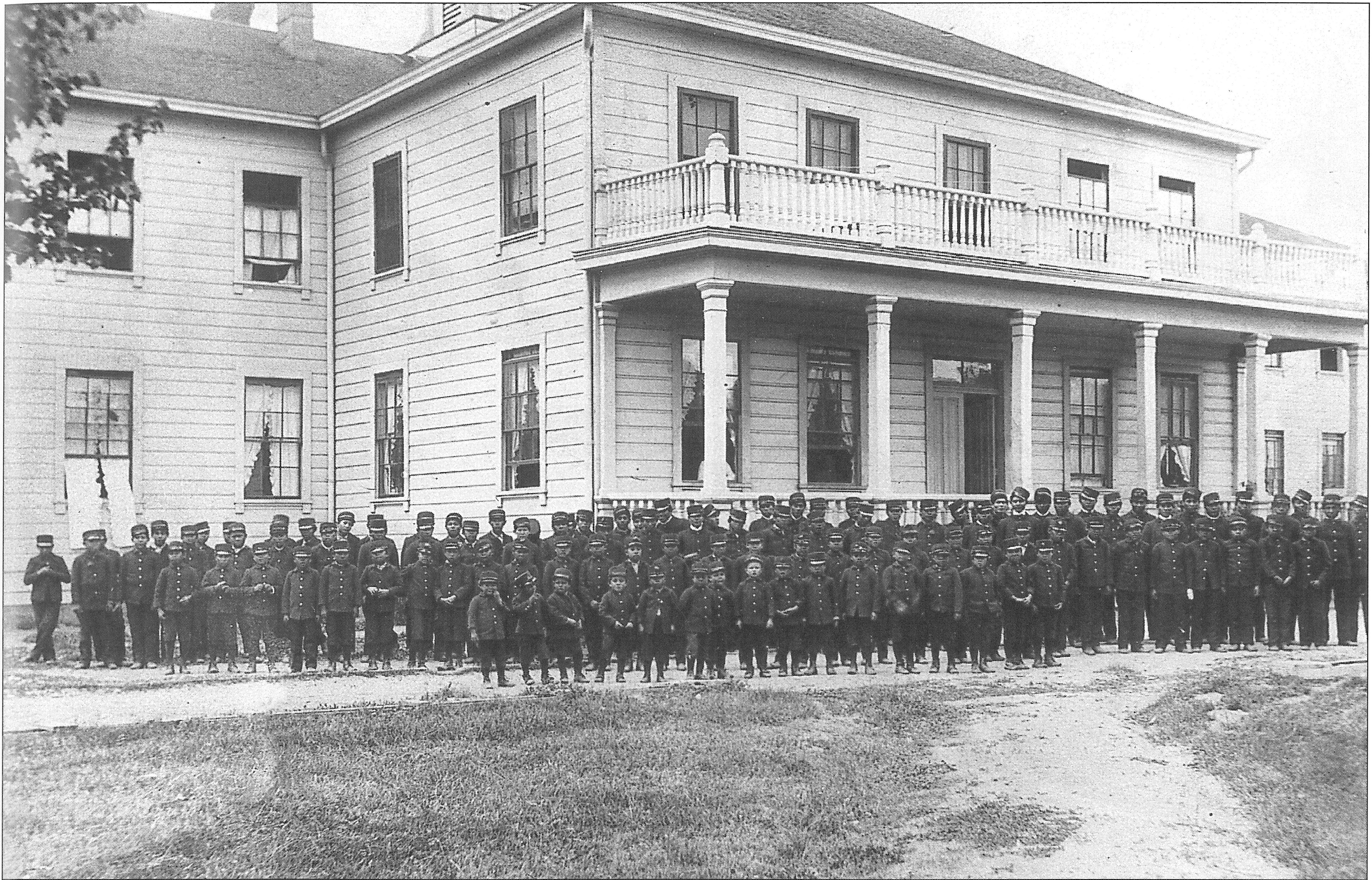
American Indian students in front of the Stewart Indian School administration building in 1905.

Senator William Morris Stewart sponsored the national legislation that funded the school, the only off-reservation boarding school for American Indian children in Nevada. The school was ordered built by the state legislature and then sold to the federal government, the only federal Indian school built this way.

During the first 10 years, only children from the Nevada-based Washoe, Paiute, and Western Shoshone tribes attended the school. During the first two decades, the children could be punished for speaking their native language. Later on, children from over sixty tribal groups including Hopi, Apache, Pima, Mohave, Walapai, Ute, Pipage, Coropah and Tewa were forced to attend the school from three dozen reservations and 335 different hometowns across the West.

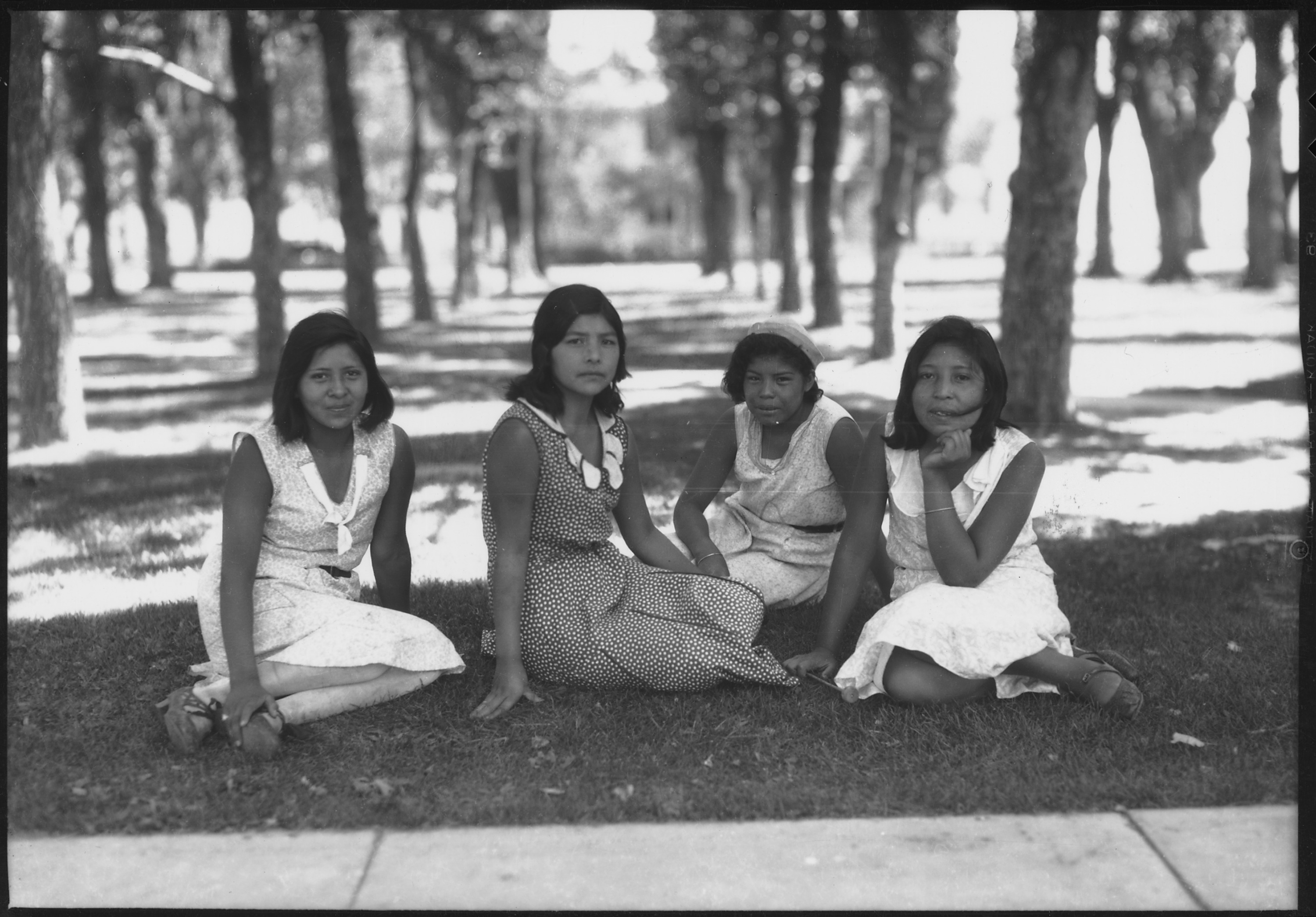
Children on the grounds of Stewart Indian School in about 1935.

When the school opened, the campus included two dormitories, a barn, carpenter's shop, harness and tool house, root shed, laundry, wood and coal shed, storehouse, girls' and boys' baths and a three-story 10,000-gallon water tower. It began with 37 students and was staffed by three teachers. The school depended on the unpaid labor of the students to keep it open. They worked many hard hours washing clothes, cooking, farming, and other manual labor necessary to keep the school operating. During the school's third year of operation, the student rebelled against the harsh working conditions. The staff were forced to negotiate with the parents which resulted in the students receiving grades for their work and being able to keep a portion of any money earned from their labor. By the 1930s, between 400 and 500 students attended the school.

Frederick Snyder was the twelfth school superintendent when he arrived, serving from 1919 to 1934. Several of his predecessors had lasted less than a year. The students spent half the day learning academics, including how to read and write English. The remainder of the day was focused on unpaid labor. Boys performed woodworking, ranching and farming, painting, mechanics, and carpentry. Girls performed domestic skills in baking, cooking, sewing, laundry, and practical nursing. The children were forced to assimilate into mainstream American culture. The young Indians were instilled with Christian ideologies. Baptisms were performed in a pool on the school grounds, and a Catholic church was built alongside the school. Assimilation policies prohibited the students from speaking their native languages and practicing native customs, which both students and their parents strongly objected to. They were required to cut their hair, wear uniforms, and march to classes.

This continued until the Indian Reorganization Act of 1934 was passed, which increased Native American self-determination and self-governance. Snyder was succeeded by Alida Cynthia Bowler, who was appointed Director of Carson Indian School and Reservations. She embraced the reforms of the Indian Reorganization Act. She also served as Indian Agent for most of Nevada, and worked to empower tribal councils. In 1936, she organized the Wai-Pai-Shone Craftsman Cooperative, from which the natives could sell their work. After several years in her position, she wrote:

The Indian in Nevada … is still discriminated against socially and exploited economically. He is primarily the under-paid agricultural season laborer upon whom the big cattle and sheep interests depend for cheap labor at certain seasons…He lives on a substandard level, and his smug white employer asserts that the Indian is perfectly content at the level and neither desires nor deserves a hand up.

The Bureau of Indian Affairs encouraged schools such as Stewart to let students speak their native languages and to promote classes in native cultures. Academics was emphasized beginning in the 1960s over vocational training. Nellie Shaw Harnar attended this school and later was a teacher and guidance counselor for 29 years.

More than 30,000 children were educated at the school before it closed in 1980 due to federal budget cuts and earthquake safety. While some students had fond memories of their time at school, others recall being bathed in kerosene, having their heads shaved, and endured nightmares from the severe discipline they received.

== Masonry buildings ==
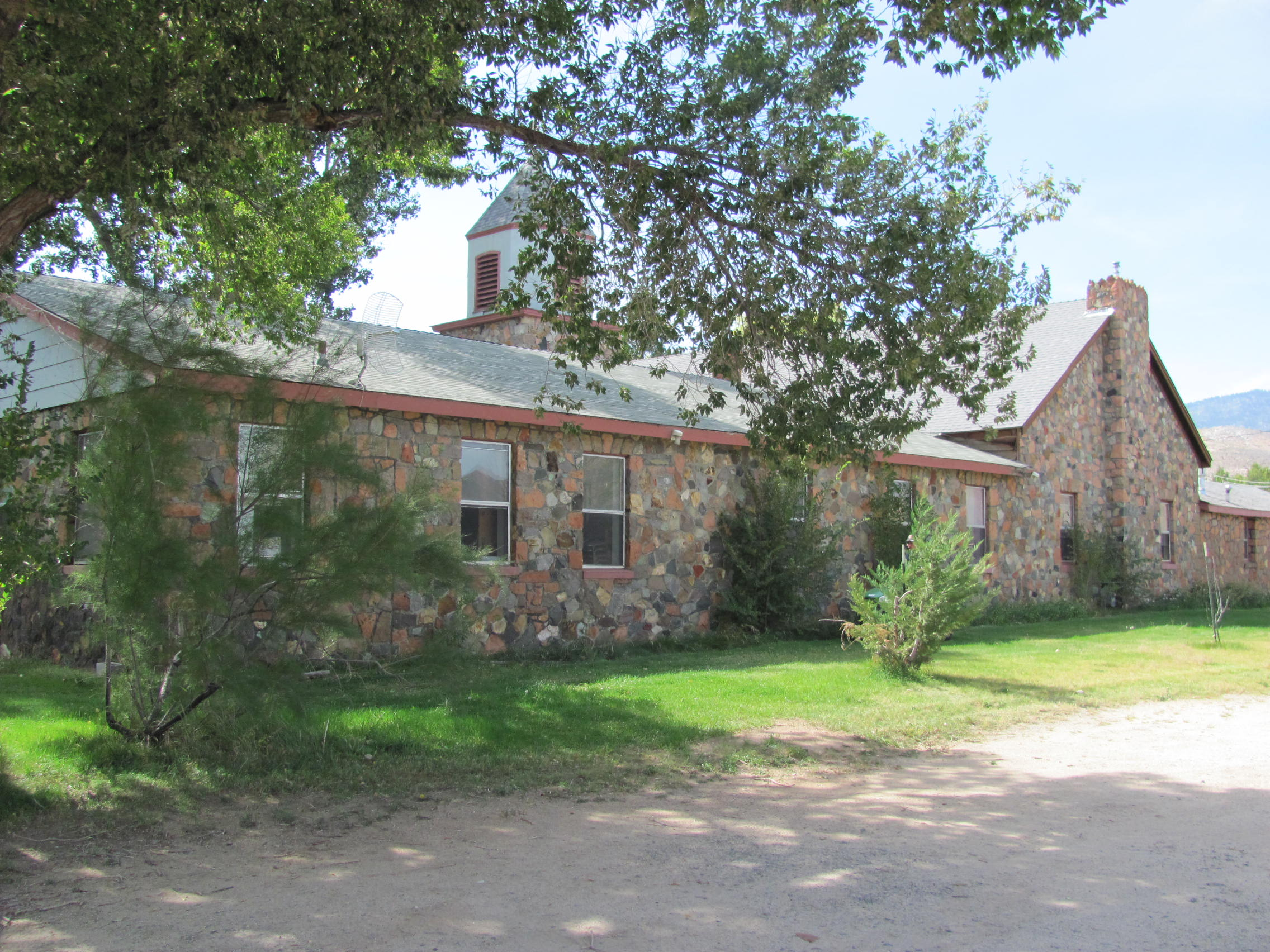
Stewart Indian School masonry building.

Snyder transformed the school into an architectural and horticultural showplace. He used colored native stone quarried from along the Carson River for campus buildings, and much of the masonry used in the vernacular-style buildings is the work of student apprentices.

The majority of the surviving buildings were built between 1922 and the beginning of World War II. The school eventually included over 63 buildings, a 10,000 gallon swimming pool and a platform for the Virginia & Truckee Railroad. The railroad stop was used to deliver supplies and transport students to and from the school. The Stewart Indian School Museum, located in superintendent Snyder's home, was built by Indian students in 1930.

== Historic preservation ==
Many of the original buildings still exist. The school was listed on the National Register of Historic Places in 1985. The NRHP listing included 63 contributing buildings and one contributing structure.

The Washoe Tribe of Nevada and California established the Stewart Indian Colony on the grounds of and adjacent to the former school. The State of Nevada uses some of the buildings for state sponsored classes, training centers and agency offices such as the Department of Corrections. A walking tour describes the former campus and relics of the school are on display at the Nevada State Museum, Carson City.

== Cultural center and museum ==
In 2017, Governor Brian Sandoval approved funding to renovate the school's Administration Office and Student Union for use as the Stewart Indian School Cultural Center and Welcome Center. The cultural center opened to the public in 2020 and describes the histories of the American Indian children that boarded at the school and the school itself. The school's former post office is now the Welcome Center.

The SISCCM houses the Wa-Pai-Shone Gallery, which hosts changing exhibitions of art curated by the Great Basin Native Artists collective. The center also hosts an annual powwow every June.

== See also ==
- Battle of Kelley Creek
- American Indian outing programs
- Indigenous peoples of the Great Basin
