= Little High Rock Canyon Wilderness =

United States Wilderness Area

Little High Rock Canyon
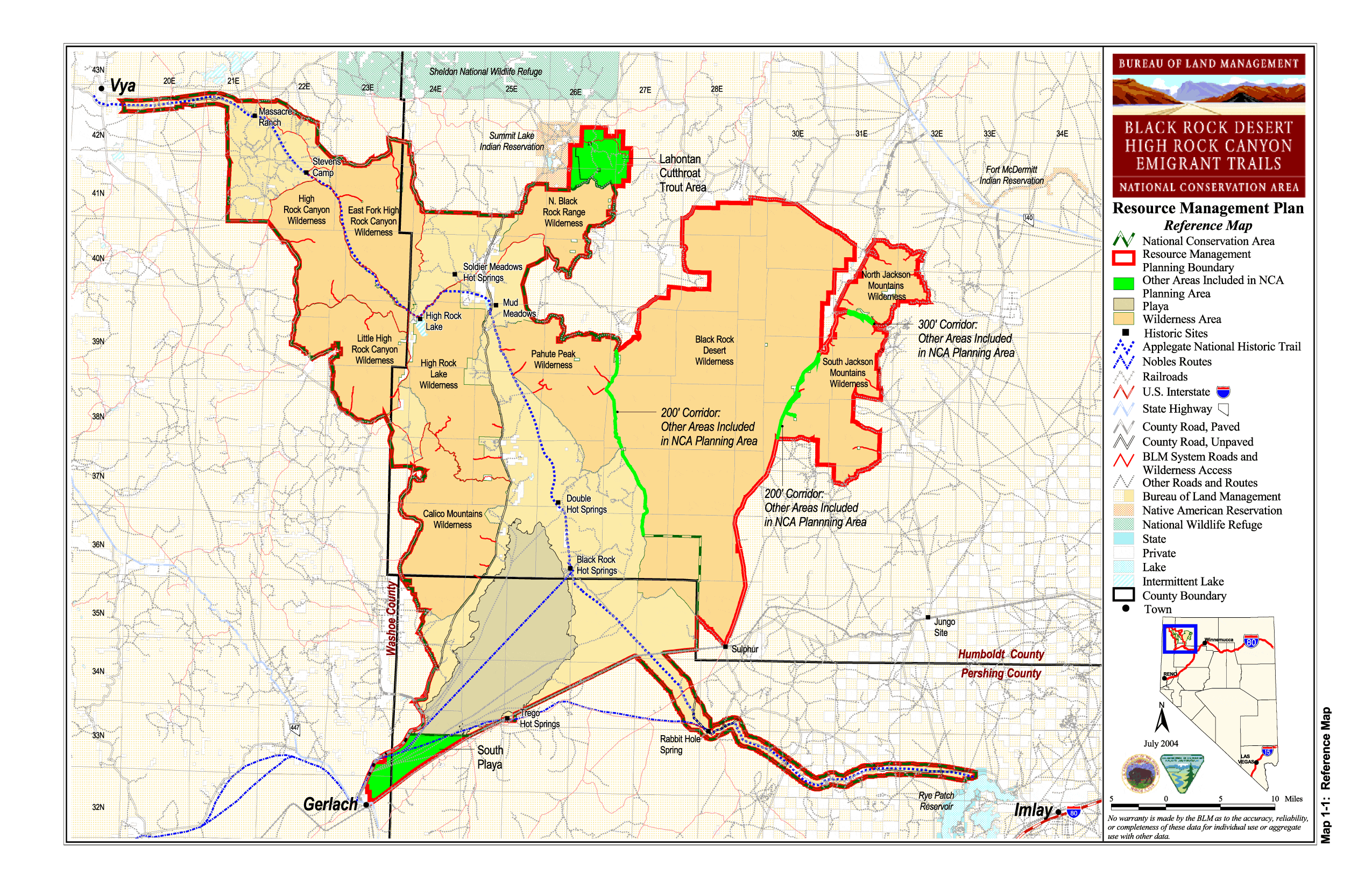
- BLM map of the Black Rock-High Rock NCA and 10 wilderness areas including Little High Rock Canyon Wilderness

- Location within Nevada
- Location: Black Rock Desert, Nevada, United States
- Coordinates: 41°15′4.627″N 119°23′41.691″W
- Elevation: 1,677 m (5,502 ft)
- Established: 2000
- Operator: Bureau of Land Management

The Little High Rock Canyon Wilderness is a US Wilderness Area in Nevada under the Bureau of Land Management. It is located south of the High Rock Canyon Wilderness and west of the High Rock Lake Wilderness.

== History ==
In the winter of 1911, Mike Daggett and his band were camped at Little High Rock Canyon where they ran low on food and killed some cattle. Laster, Daggett and his band killed a cattleman and three sheepmen who had gone to investigate the missing cattle. Daggett and his band were pursued to Kelley Creek, near Winnemucca where the Battle of Kelley Creek occurred. Daggett and seven of his band were killed along with a posse member. Only four children of the band survived the battle.

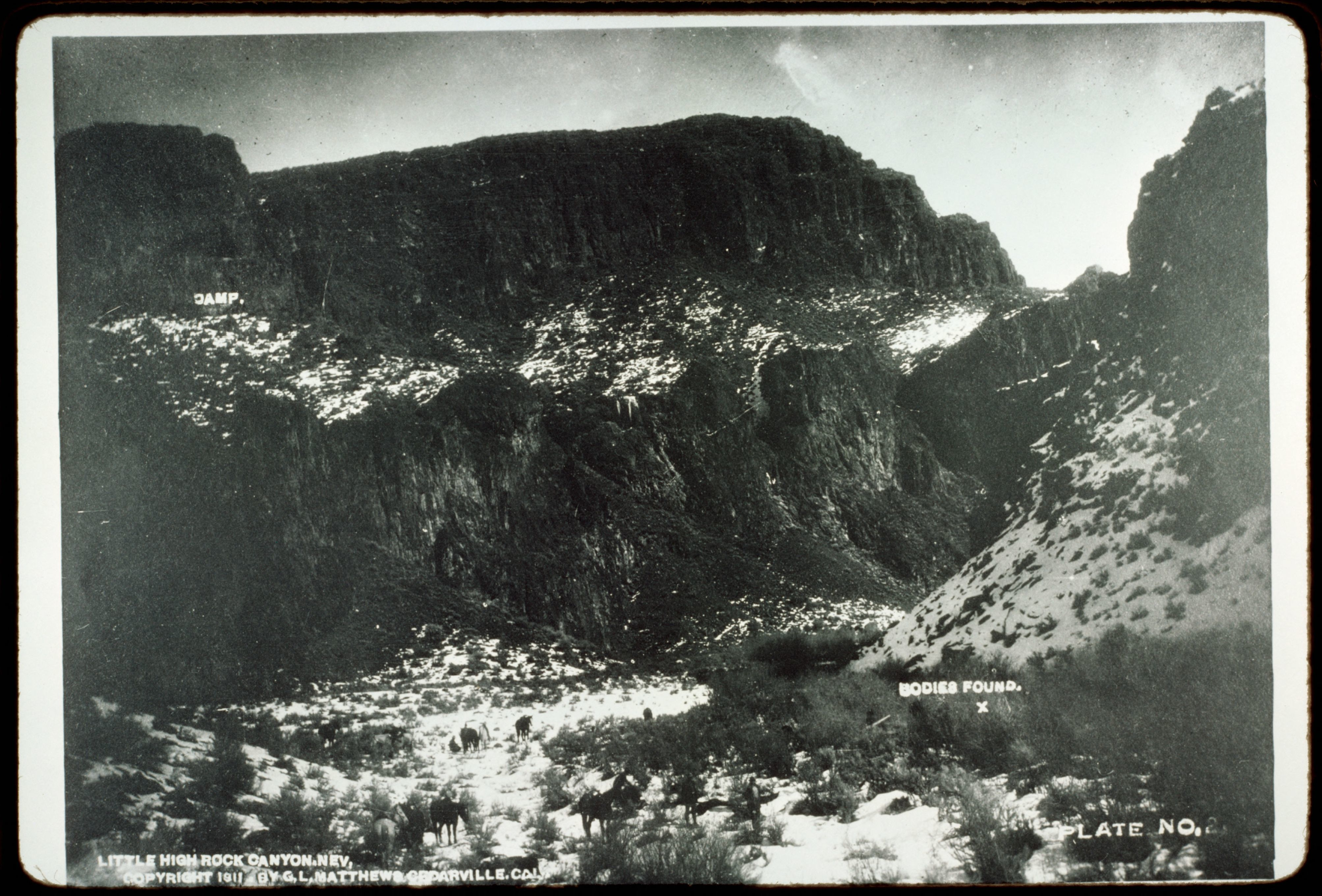
Site of Deserted Indian Camp where bodies of Stockmen were found at lower right 1911

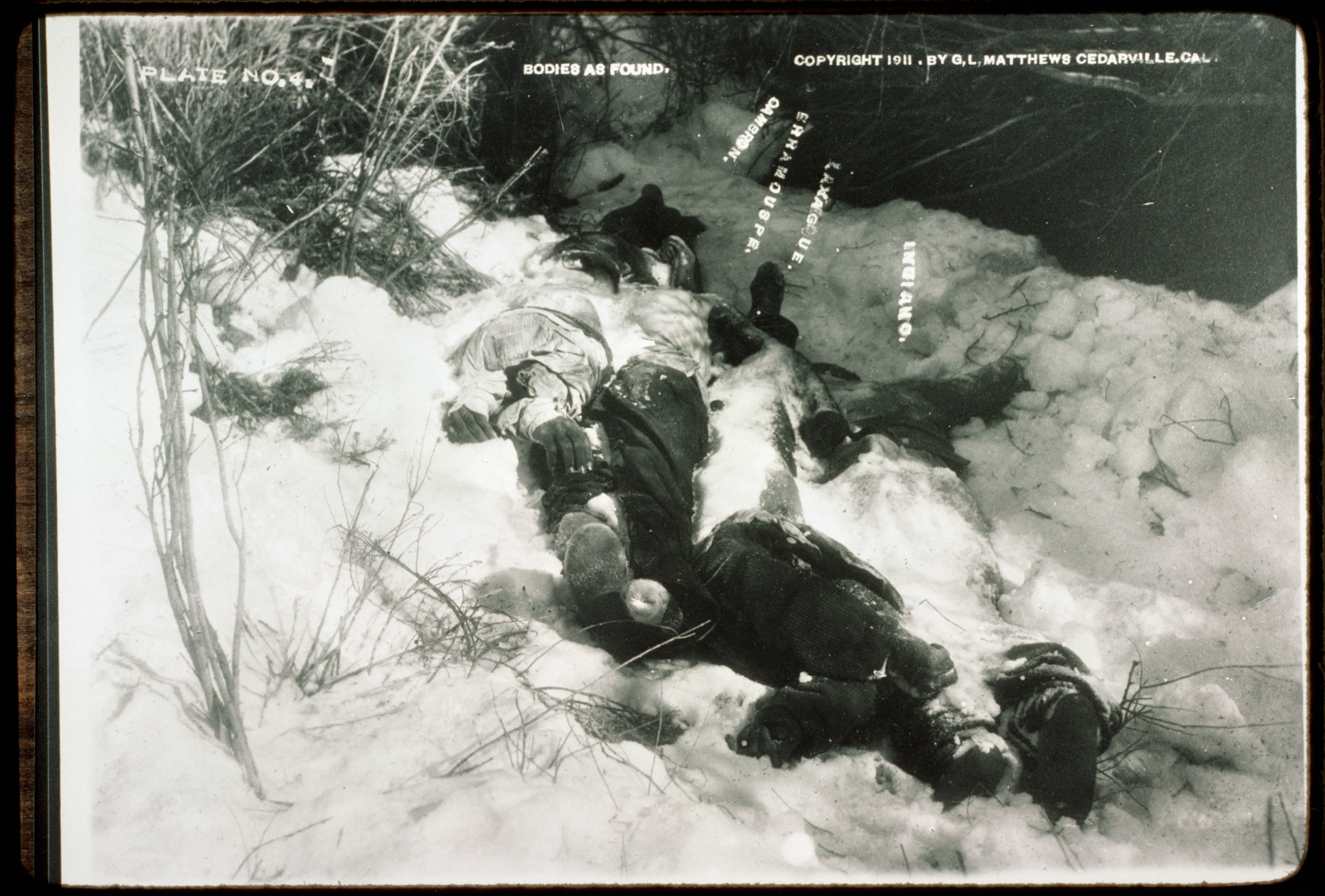
Bodies of the four stockmen as found at the Indian Camp

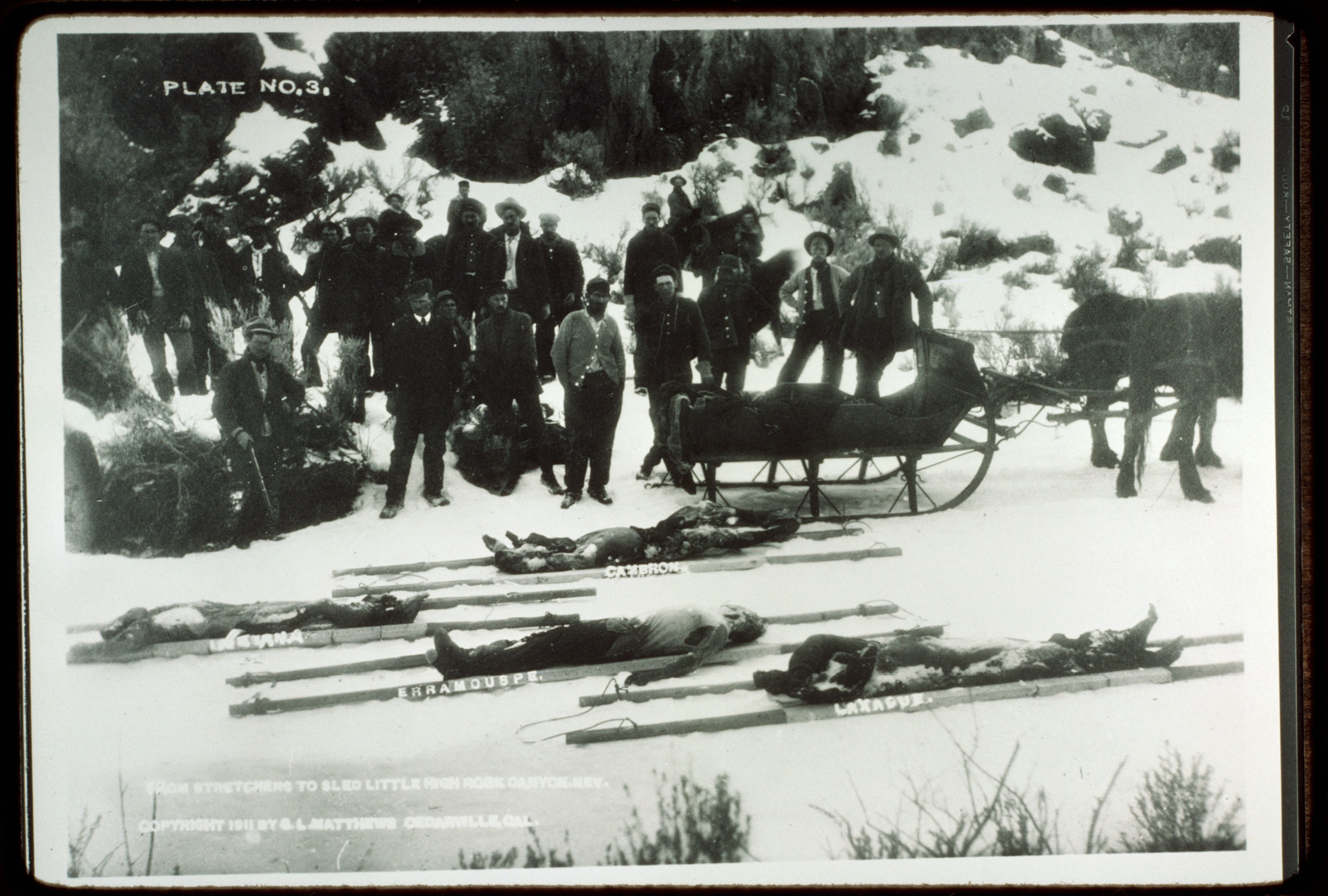
Bodies of the four stockmen out of the Back Country

In 2005, a plaque describing the events of 1911 was placed at Little High Rock Canyon.

== See also ==
- Black Rock Desert-High Rock Canyon Emigrant Trails National Conservation Area
