= High Rock Lake Wilderness =

Protected area in Nevada, United States

High Rock Lake
- IUCN category Ib (wilderness area)
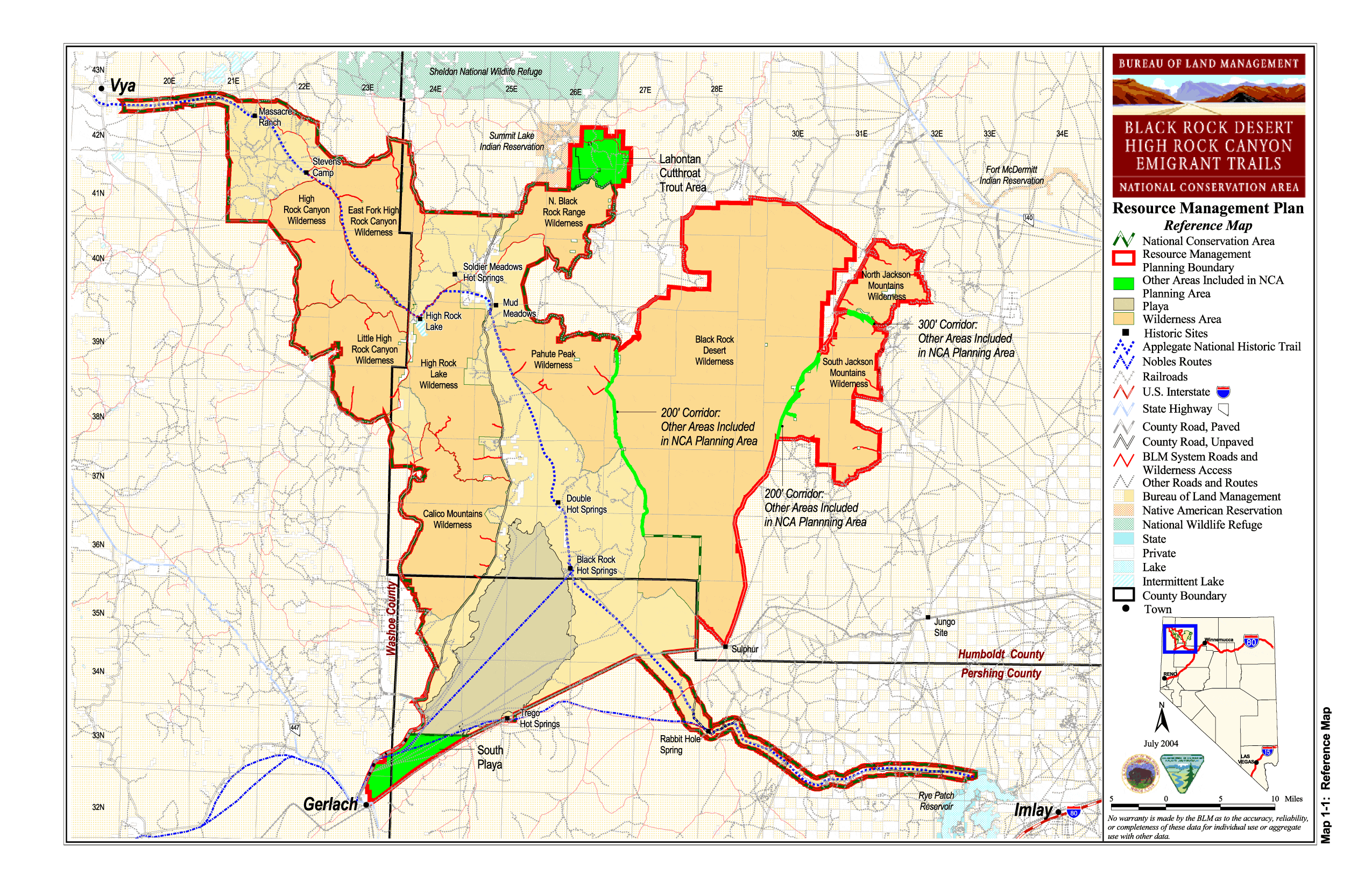
- BLM map of the Black Rock-High Rock NCA and 10 wilderness areas including High Rock Lake Wilderness

- Location within Nevada Location within the United States
- Location: Black Rock Desert, Nevada, United States
- Coordinates: 41°12′53.629″N 119°13′19.665″W
- Elevation: 1,852 m (6,076 ft)
- Established: 2000
- Operator: Bureau of Land Management

The High Rock Lake Wilderness is a wilderness area in Nevada containing the northern portion of the Calico Hills. High Rock Lake, for which the wilderness was named, was created about 11,800 years ago after a large rockslide closed the outlet (Box Canyon) to High Rock and Little High Rock Canyons. This new outlet (Fly Canyon) cut a narrow canyon that empties at Soldier Meadows. One special geological feature in Fly Canyon is the potholes. The potholes were carved by whirlpool action of sand and gravel in the stream. Another unique feature is the Fly Slide where emigrants lowered their wagons with ropes into Fly Canyon portion of the Applegate-Lassen Trail. Elevations in the wilderness range from 4,000 to 7,660 ft (1,220 to 2,330 m) with scattered vegetation of saltbrush and sagebrush.

The wilderness area is managed by the Bureau of Land Management.

== See also ==
- Black Rock Desert-High Rock Canyon Emigrant Trails National Conservation Area
