= Paiute Indian Reservation =

Paiute Indian Reservation can refer to:

- The reservation of the Burns Paiute Tribe of Oregon
- The reservation of the Paiute Indian Tribe of Utah
