= Calico Mountains Wilderness =

Protected area in Nevada, United States

Calico Mountains
- IUCN category Ib (wilderness area)
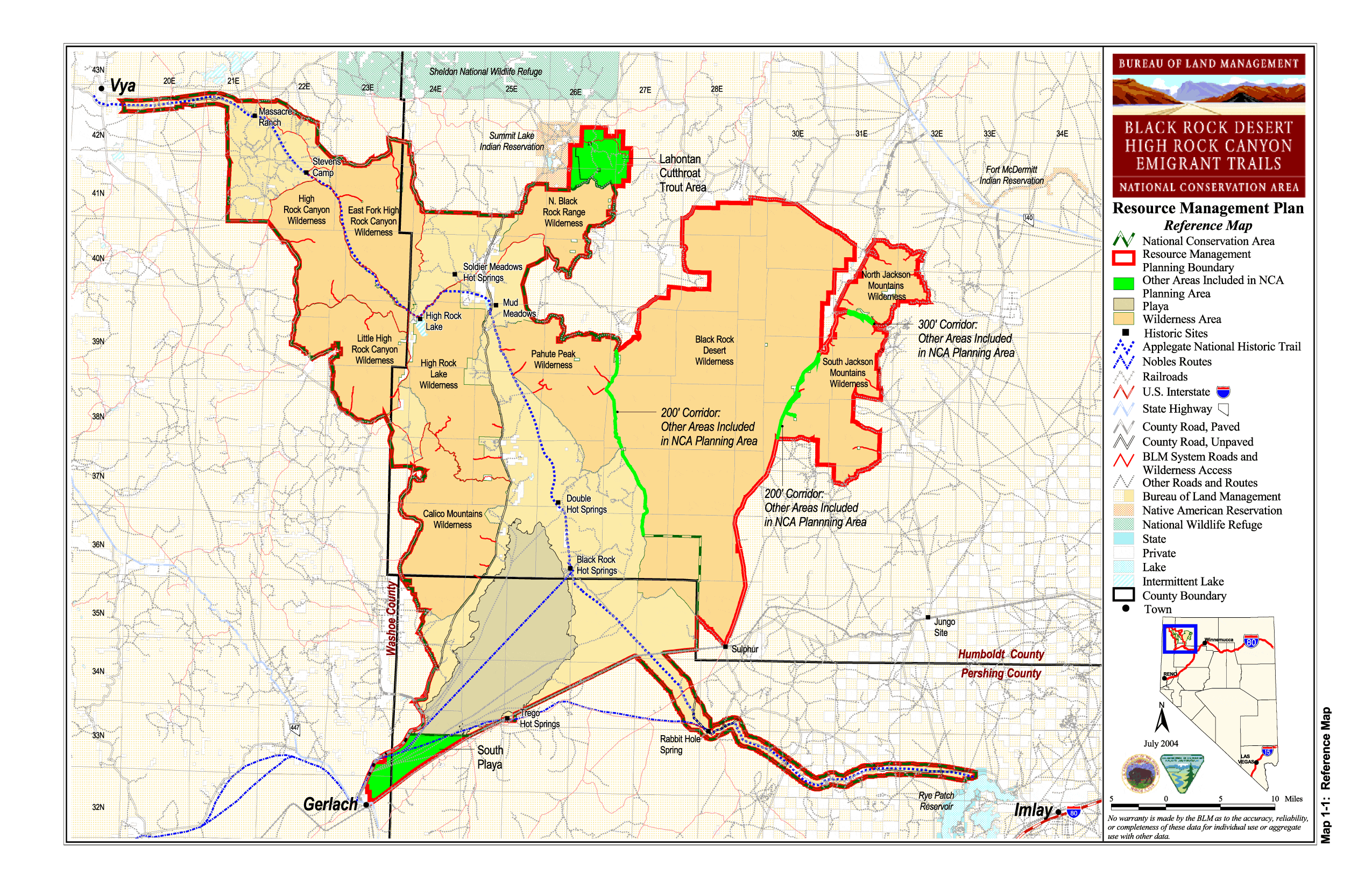
- BLM map of the Black Rock-High Rock NCA and 10 wilderness areas including Calico Mountains Wilderness

- Location within Nevada Location within the United States
- Location: Black Rock Desert, Nevada, United States
- Coordinates: 41°1′17.634″N 119°13′33.660″W
- Elevation: 2,085 m (6,841 ft)
- Established: 2000
- Operator: Bureau of Land Management

Calico Mountains Wilderness is a U S Wilderness Area in Nevada under the Bureau of Land Management. It is located in the Calico Hills.

Rockhounding, hunting, and day-hiking are in the wilderness. Photography of geologic formations and spring wildflowers is a pastime of local visitors. Box, Fly, and Cherry Creek Canyons provide a setting for day-hiking, backpacking, photography, wildlife and wild horse viewing opportunities. Hunting for mule deer, antelope, and game birds is popular in the area.

== See also ==
- Black Rock Desert-High Rock Canyon Emigrant Trails National Conservation Area
