= Calico Hills, Humboldt County, Nevada =

Mountain range in northwestern Nevada, US

Calico Hills
- Calico Mountains
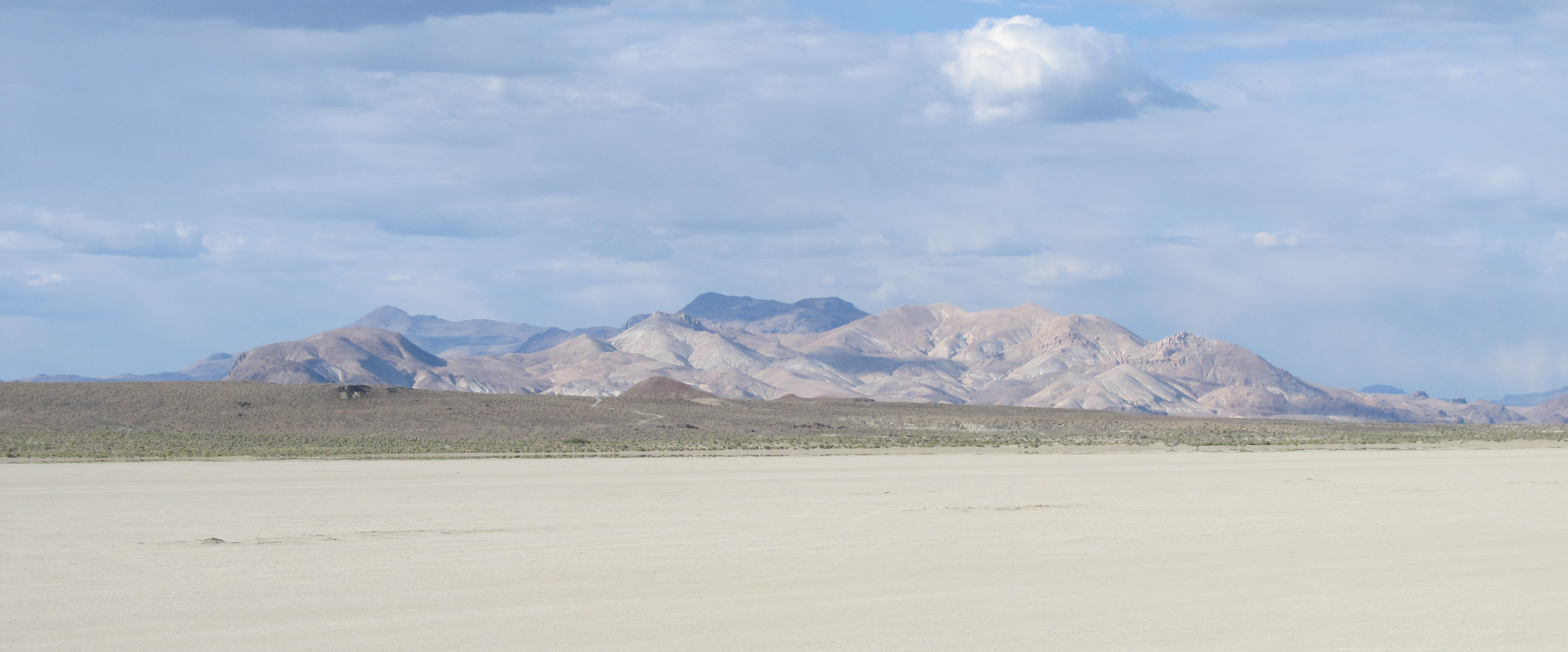
- Calico Hills, Black Rock Desert, Nevada

Highest point
- Peak: Donnelly Peak
- Elevation: 8,520 ft (2,600 m)

Geography
- Location within Nevada
- Country: United States
- State: Nevada
- Region: Black Rock Desert
- County: Humboldt County and Pershing County
- Range coordinates: 41°05′51.63″N 119°15′43.67″W

The Calico Hills or Calico Mountains are a mountain range in northwestern Nevada. The range runs north to south along the western edge of the Black Rock Desert. This mountain range is located in western Humboldt County and the northwestern corner of Pershing County, approximately 30 miles north of the town of Gerlach, Nevada. The best access to the Calico Hills is located from the maintained Soldier Meadows Road (Humboldt County Road 200) that forms its eastern boundary.

Most of the mountain range is divided into two federally designated wilderness areas. It is part of the Black Rock Desert-High Rock Canyon Emigrant Trails National Conservation Area. The Calico Mountains Wilderness is the southern end of the range. It contains many brightly colored geologic formations. Elevations in the wilderness range from 3,950 feet to 8,520 feet at Donnelly Peak.

The northwestern arm of the Black Rock Desert and Pahute Peak in the Black Rock Range lie to the east and the Granite Range lies to the southwest. The High Rock Lake Wilderness is part of the northern end of the Calico Hills.
