= Battle of Kelley Creek =

Massacre of Native Americans by U.S. forces

Coordinates: 41.2649003°N 117.0951145°W

- Part of the American Indian Wars
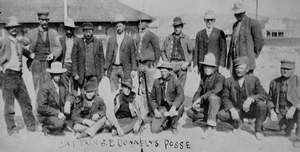
- The posse of J.P. Donnelley.
Date	February 25, 1911
Location	Humboldt County, Nevada
Result	United States victory

Belligerents
United States	Daggett's Shoshone band

Commanders and leaders
J. P. Donnelley	Mike Daggett †

Casualties and losses
1 killed	8 killed, including 2 children 4* surviving children captured and arrested
- 3 of the captured children died within the three following years due to illness
- Location of Kelley Creek, Nevada Battle of Kelley Creek (the United States)

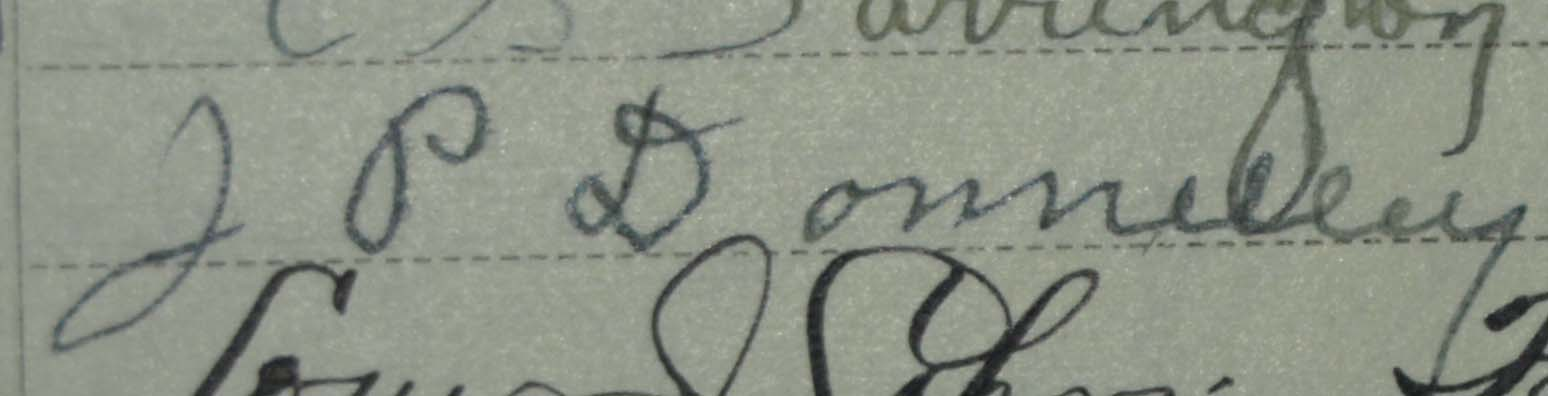
Signature of J. P. Donnelley. Leader of the posse involved in the Battle of Kelley Creek. The signature is taken from a registered mail signing book from Carson City, NV - 1812 - 1813. In the private collection of H. Blair Howell.

The Battle of Kelley Creek, also known as the Last Massacre, is often considered one of the last known massacres carried out between Native Americans and forces of the United States, and was a closing event to occur near the end of the American Indian warfare era. In January 1911 a small band of Shoshones were accused of rustling cattle and then killing four stockmen who they thought had come to investigate the dead cattle. A posse of policemen and citizens was sent to track the band, who were found encamped near Winnemucca, Nevada, in a region known as Kelley Creek. A largely one-sided battle ensued on February 25 that ended with the direct deaths of nine people, eight Daggetts and one posse member. At the time, the affair was briefly characterized as a Native American revolt, though it is now mostly regarded as a family's attempted escape from law enforcement.

== Background ==
Mike Daggett, or Shoshone Mike (only after his death), was the chief of the small band and in the spring of 1910, he led his group of eleven off the Fort Hall Reservation at Rock Creek, Idaho. All but two of the group's men were members of Mike's family, which included three women and four or five children. They first headed south into northern Nevada where a son of Shoshone Mike called Dugan was mortally wounded by white cattle rustlers and in revenge the band killed Frank Dopp in May 1910 and buried him; his remains were found 2 months later.

The Daggett band realized that they had little chance of justice in the hands of the Whites, so they traveled west to Oroville, California, before heading back into Nevada to spend the winter at Little High Rock Canyon in northern Washoe County. In January 1911, the Daggett band was running low on food, so they abducted and butchered some cattle belonging to a local rancher. A Basque sheepherder named Bert Indiano witnessed the event but was driven away by the Indians. He met three stockmen from Surprise Valley, California, who were checking on their stock on the winter range. The men were Harry Cambron and two prominent Basque sheepmen, Peter Erramouspe and John Laxague. A day or two before the arrival of the four stockmen, the Indians had robbed several articles from a camp of an unnamed Chinese man whom they then met and killed when the man said he was going to kill them; the body was then buried. Upon arrival the posse of four men instead ran into Mike Daggett and two of his sons, who were reported to be waiting for them.

=== Last Massacre ===
The Daggetts had apparently realized the stockmen would be coming to find them, so when the posse entered the canyon on January 19, the natives opened fire with rifles and pistols, killing all four of them (Harry Cambron and the three Basque sheepmen Bert Indiano, Peter Erramouspe, and John Laxague). On February 8, a search party from Eagleville, California, found the bodies in a creekbed. The bodies were mutilated, partially undressed, and had numerous gunshot wounds. When word of the killings reached the surrounding settlements, many who felt at risk temporarily evacuated the area. The men who stayed behind remained armed and alert at all times. Initially, it was thought that a gang of outlaws from Oregon or a band of Modocs were responsible. The Nevada and California State Police organized a posse under the command of Captain J.P. Donnelley to find the suspects, who had decided to flee towards the Duck Valley Indian Reservation. Other posses were also organized (though only Donnelley's would ever make contact with the Daggetts), and a large cash bounty was promised to anyone who managed to arrest or kill the fugitives.

== Battle ==
Donnelley's posse included at least five policemen, a few armed civilians, and the "county coroner and physician". After stopping in Little High Rock Canyon on February 13, they continued despite extreme cold and winter weather. Over 200 miles further, and on February 25, the posse found Daggett and his family hiding in an area known as Kelley Creek, northeast of Winnemucca. It is unclear which side shot first, but a battle erupted that lasted for around three hours. The women reportedly fought equally alongside the men. Father and chief Mike Daggett was among the first casualties during the battle, but his death only made the members of his family desperately fight back harder, even as they were inevitably forced back. At some point during the conflict, the remaining Daggetts had run out of ammunition for their guns and were forced to resort to bows, spears, and tomahawks. By the end of the battle, only four of the original twelve Daggett family members were still alive: a sixteen-year-old girl and three young children, who were taken into police custody. One member of Donnelley's posse, Deputy Ed Hogle of Eagleville, was killed during the fight. Two other young Daggett children were also reported to have been shot inadvertently. After the battle was over, the posse found evidence linking the killings in Little High Rock Canyon to the natives. Other than Mike's war bonnet, the posse found guns and a watch that had belonged to Harry Cambron, identified by brother Ben Cambron.

The bodies of the natives were taken by wagon to Golconda, Nevada, and buried in a mass grave made from the crater of a dynamite explosion. A tall pole was placed at the site as a grave marker. Years later, when the land was donated to the Museum of National History, the site was excavated, and partial remains were found. Eventually, the remains were donated by a local rancher to the Smithsonian Institution. In 1994, the remains were repatriated to the Fort Hall, Idaho, Shoshone-Bannock Tribe.

In 1911, the remains of Ed Hogle were returned to Eagleville, where he was buried. Sheriff Charles Ferrell, who was in command of the investigation (but not present at the battle) arrived back in Reno on March 2 with the four surviving captives, and they claimed that while the man had indeed been Shoshone Mike, their mother was Bannock. The four were informally adopted by Reno's civilian population until in May 1911 they were enrolled in the Stewart Indian School near Carson City, Nevada. By 1913, three of the children had died of natural causes, and only one of the survivors, Mary Jo Estep, was left alive; she died in 1992. The reward offered to anyone who could catch or kill the Daggett party was initially denied to the posse by Governor Tasker Oddie, due to the fact that there were state policemen involved, but the case was later settled in favor of the posse by the Supreme Court of Nevada in 1915.

A marker was placed near the battle site. The Twin Creeks gold mine is located just to the east of the marker. The 1996 environmental impact statement for the mine mentions a reconfiguration of an overburden and interburden site to avoid the marker's location.

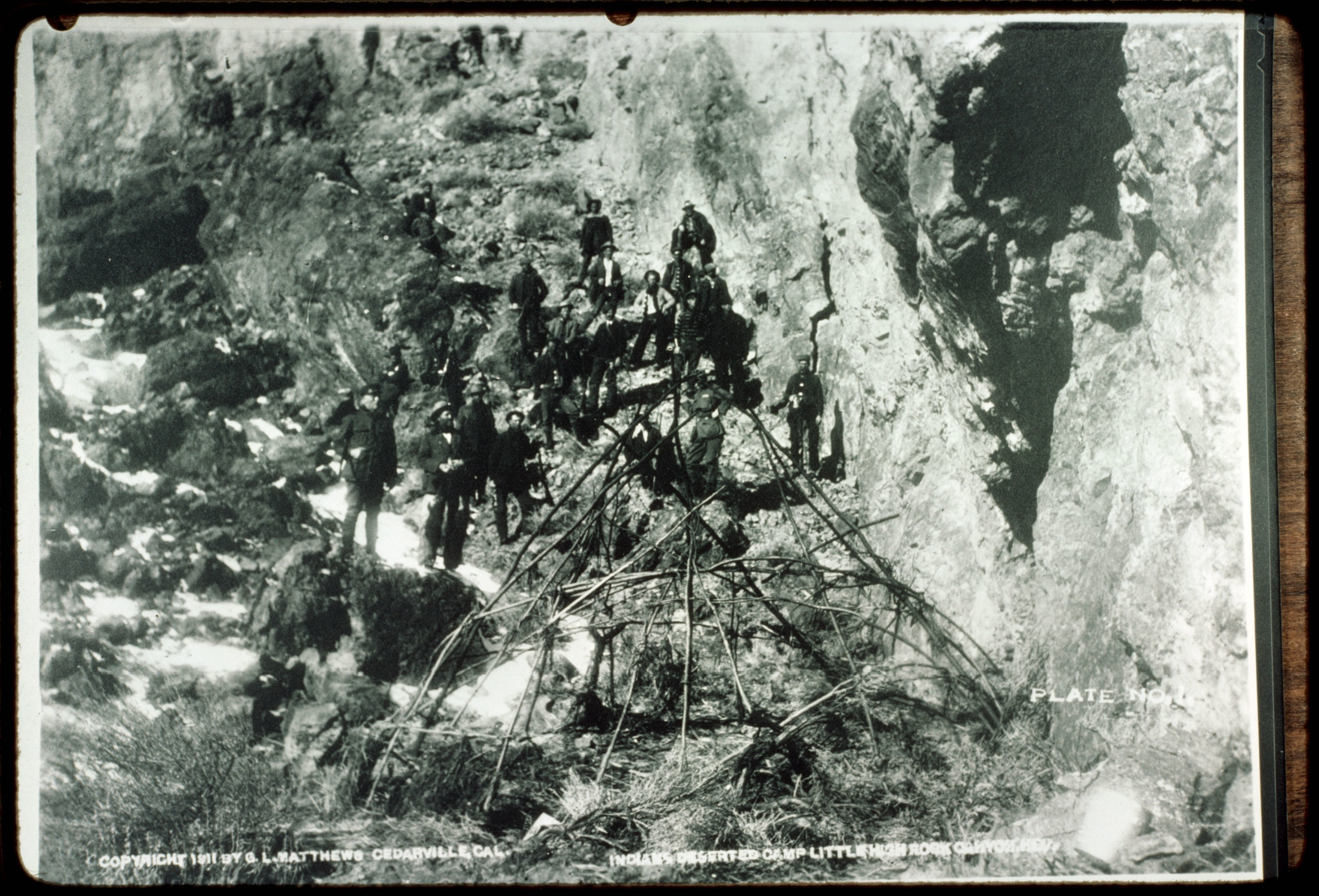
Site of Deserted Indian Camp February 8, 1911

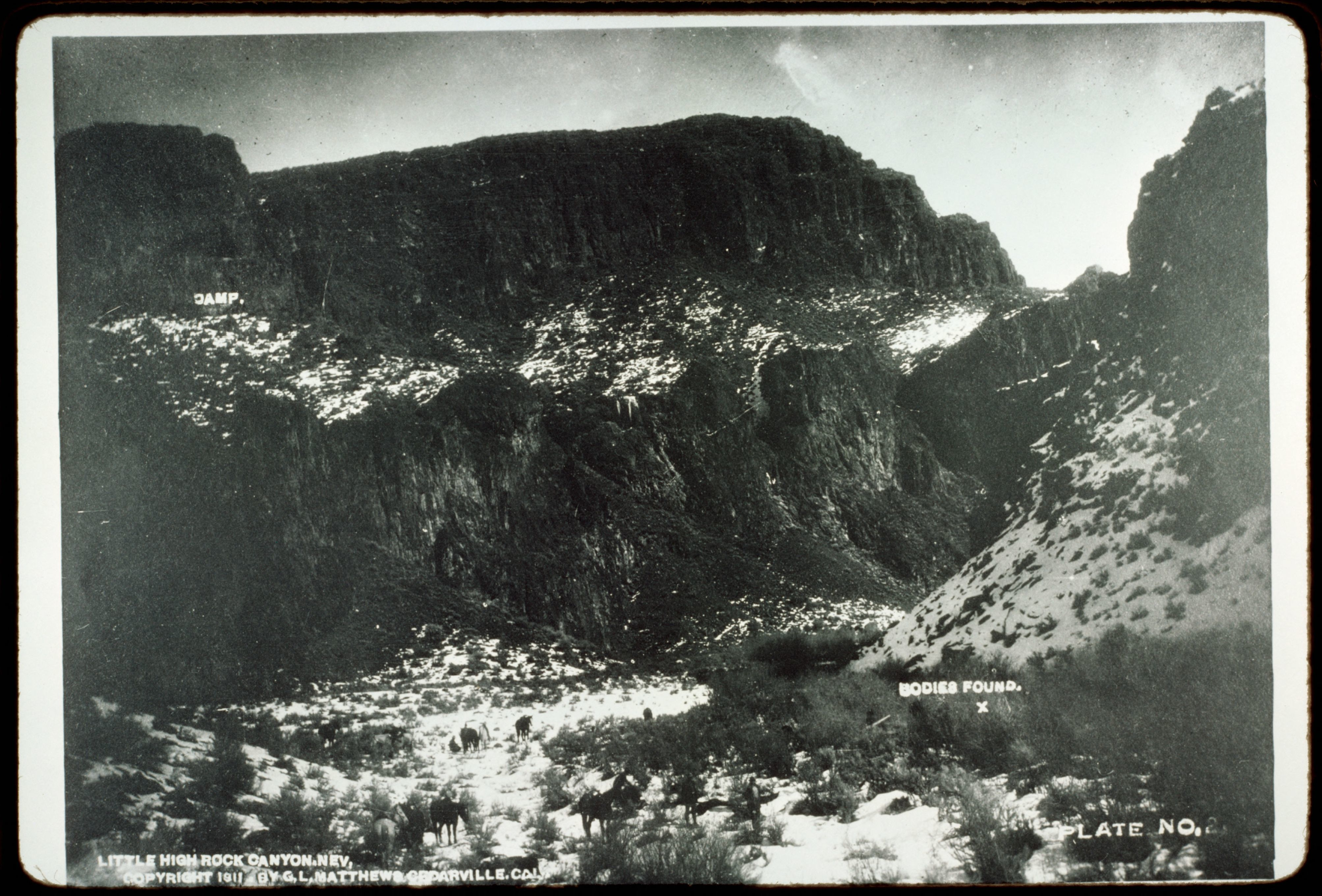
Site of Deserted Indian Camp where bodies of Stockmen were found at lower right 1911

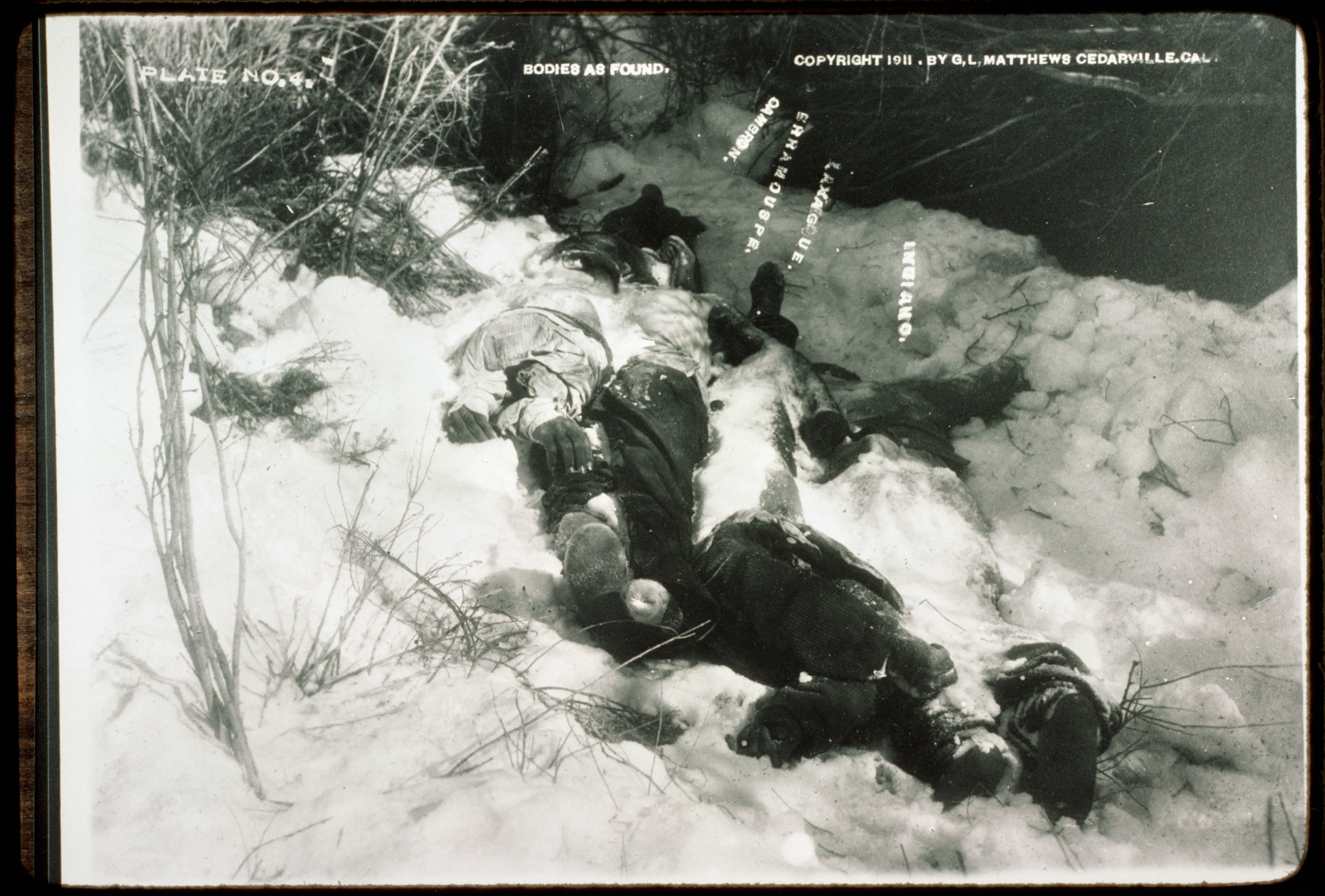
Bodies of the four stockmen as found at the Indian Camp Left to right:Harry Cambron, Peter Erramouspe, John Laxague, Bert Indiano

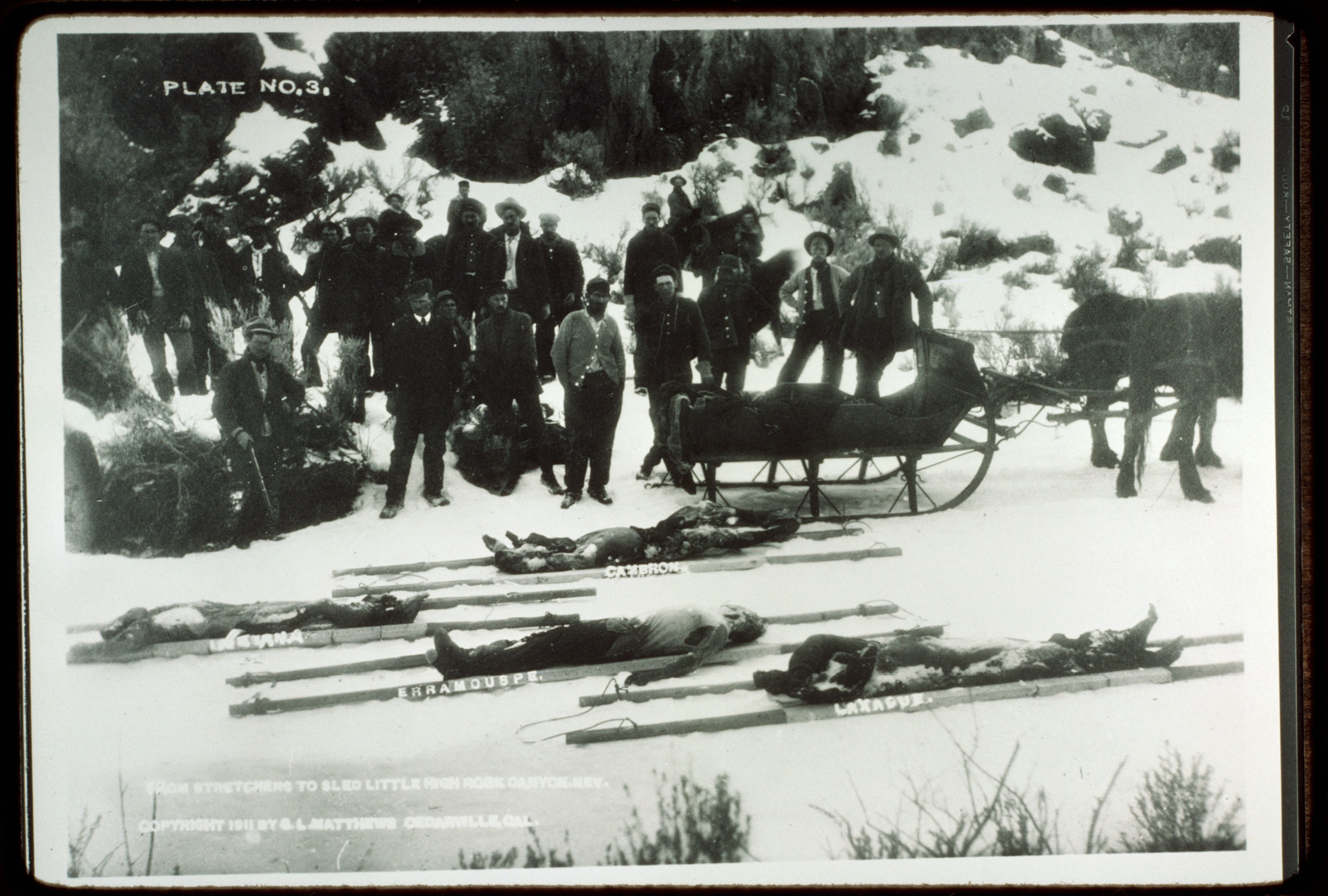
Bodies of the four stockmen out of the Back Country Background:Harry Cambron. Foreground left to right:Bert Indiano, Peter Erramouspe, John Laxague,

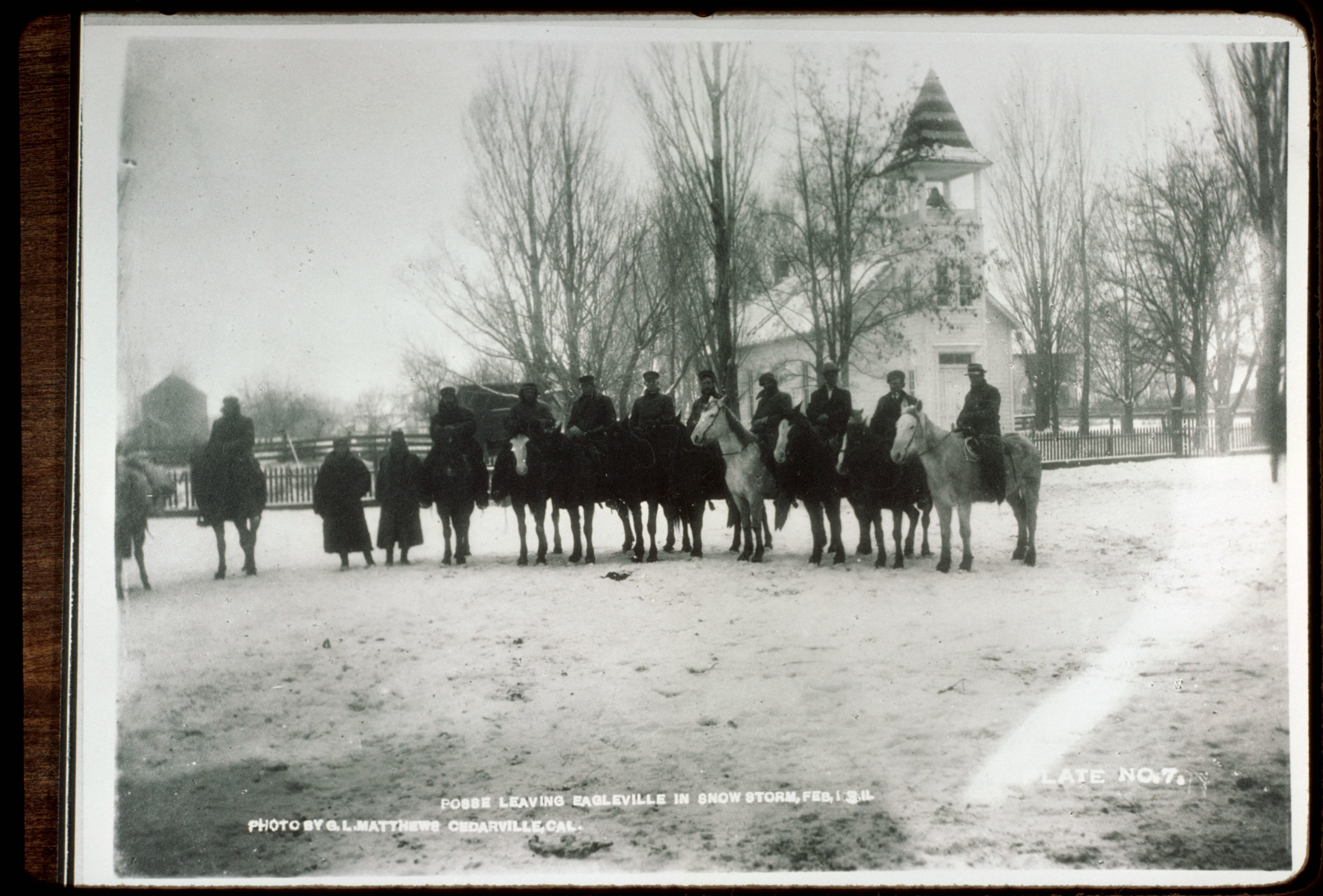
Posse leaving Eagleville, California, in Snowstorm February 9, 1911

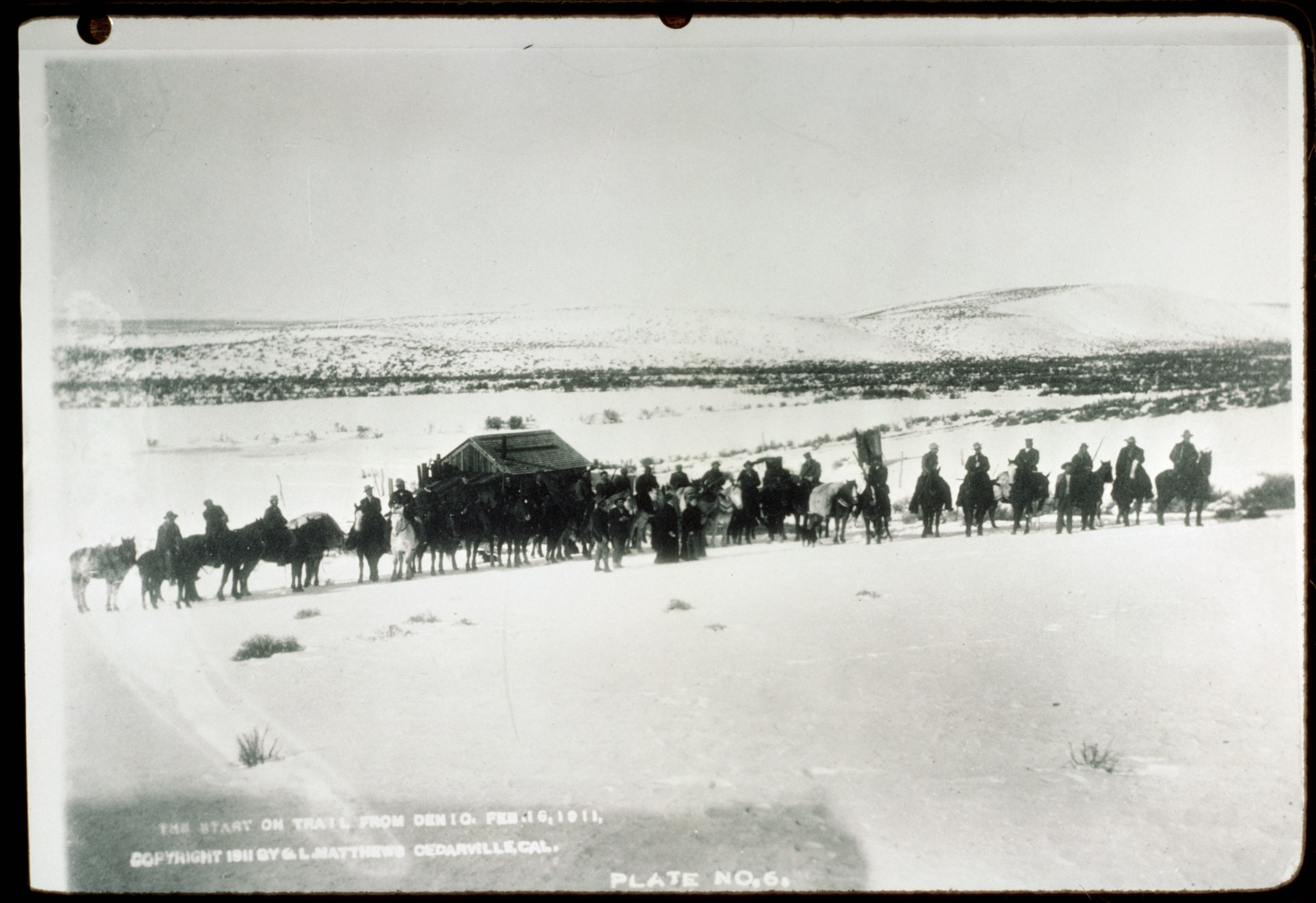
Posse starting on the Trail February 9, 1911

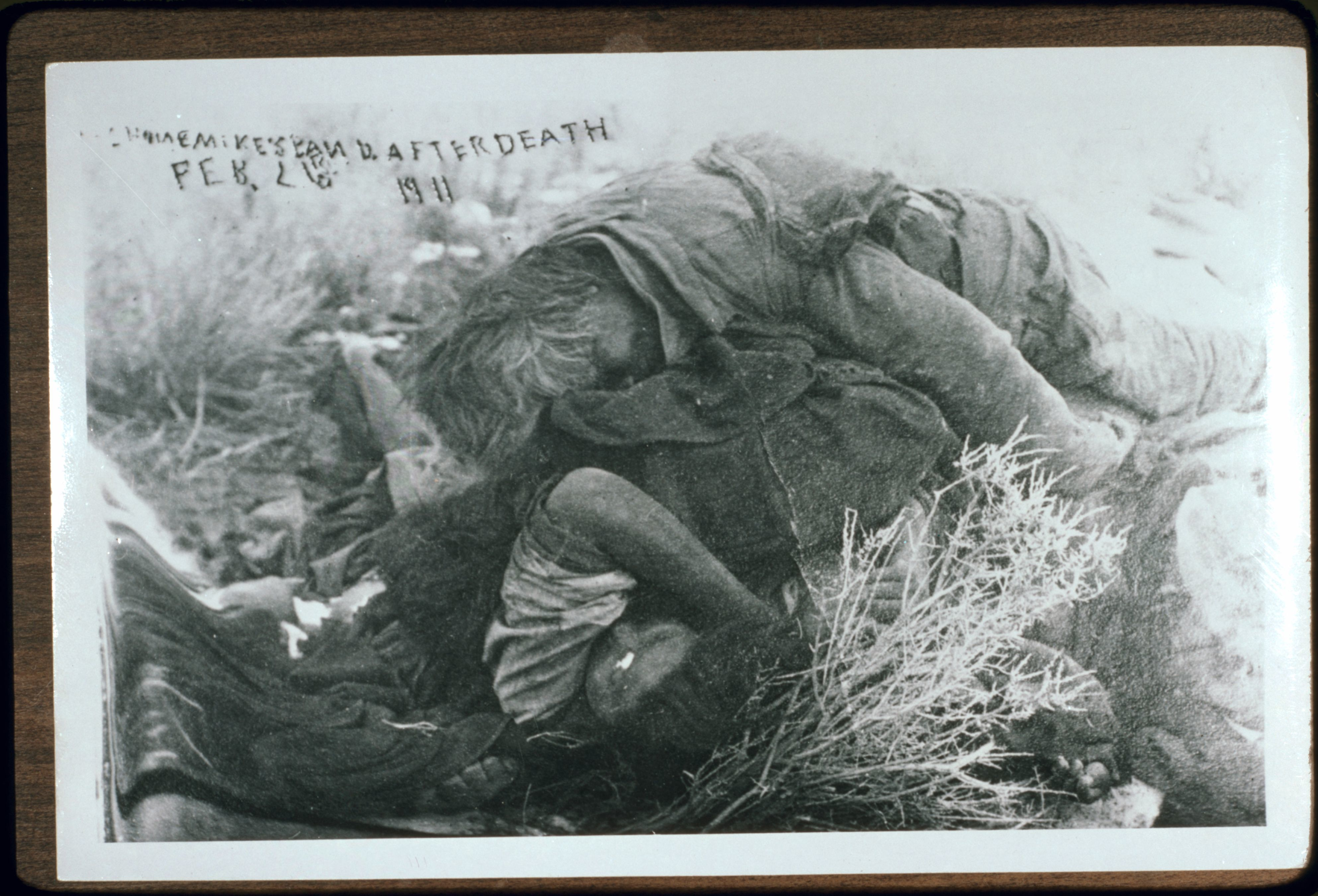
Reported picture of body of Mike Daggett with three bodies of his band February 26, 1911

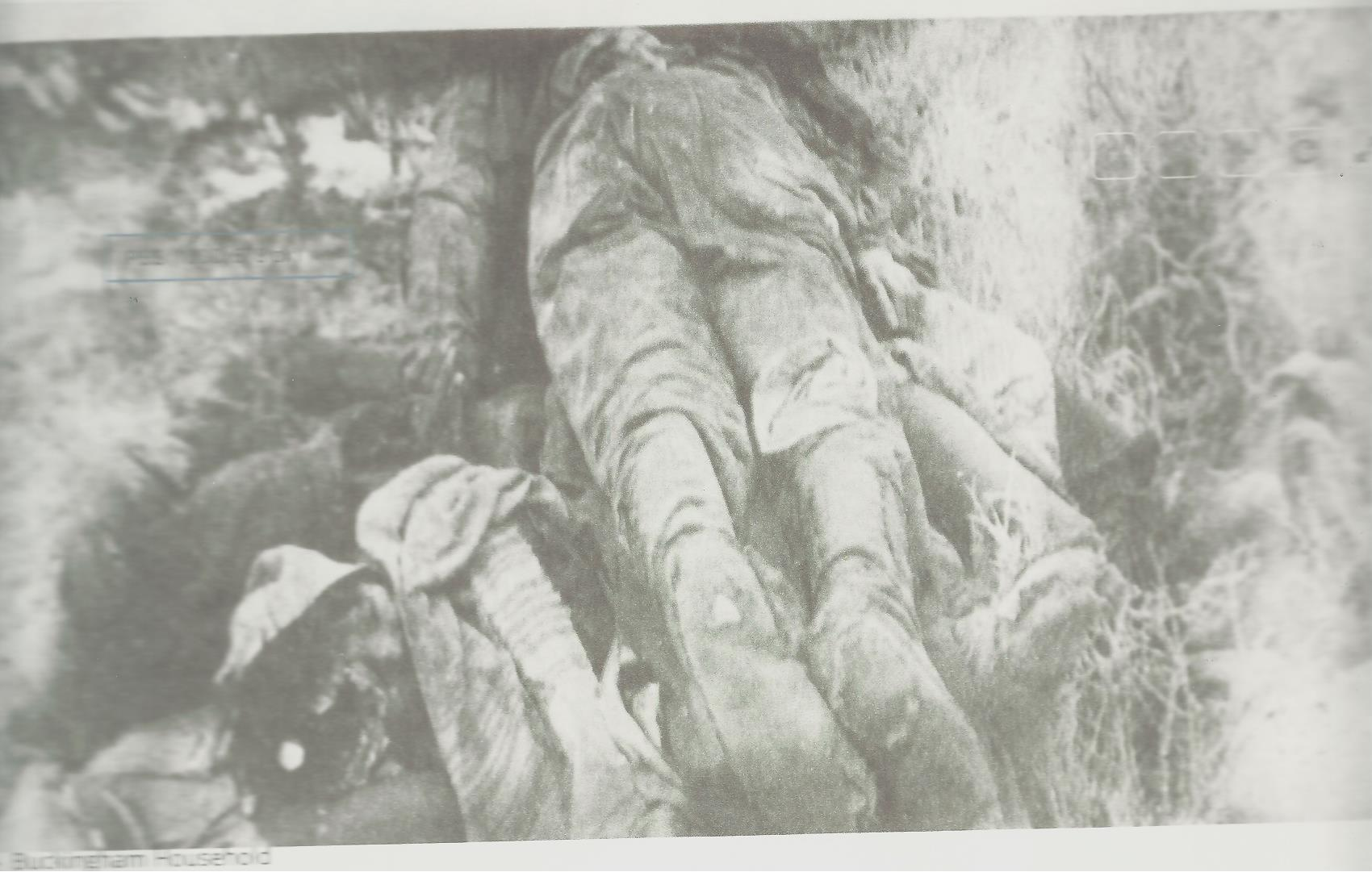
Shoshone Mike's Band after death February 26, 1911-Body of Mike Daggett with five other bodies of his band [2 in the left foreground and the 3 in background under Daggett (See Preceding caption)]

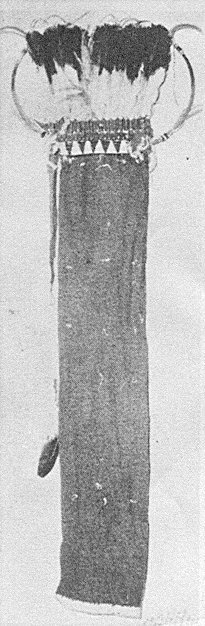
Shoshone Mike's war bonnet, found at Kelley Creek on February 25, 1911.

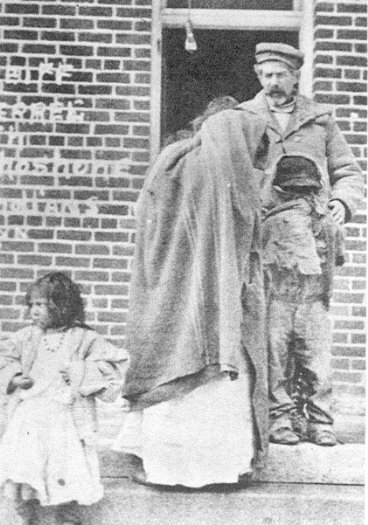
Sheriff Charles Ferrel with the surviving members of Mike Daggett's family. ( Dagget's daughter Heney (Louise, 17), and two of his grandchildren, Hattie (Harriet Mosho, 4)) (left) and Cleveland (Mosho, 8), (right)

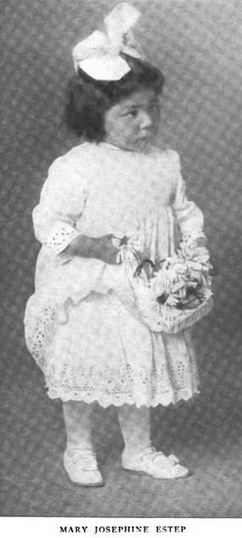
Daggett grandchild Mary Jo Estep {1909/1910-1992} age 5 in 1916

== See also ==
- Bannock War
- Bannock Uprising
- Ruby Murders
