= Frederick A. Snyder =

California legislator

Frederick A. Snyder served in the California legislature and during the Mexican–American War he served in the US Army.
