= Nellie Shaw Harnar =

American historian and educator (1905–1985)

- Born: Nellie Shaw; June 8, 1905; Wadsworth, Nevada, U.S.
- Died: 1985 (aged 79–80); Reno, Nevada, U.S.
- Children: 1

Academic background
- Education: Northern Arizona University; University of Nevada, Reno
- Influences: Sarah Winnemucca

Academic work
- Discipline: Native American history
- Institutions: Bureau of Indian Education; Stewart Indian School

Nellie Shaw Harnar (June 8, 1905 – 1985) was a Northern Paiute historian and educator who contributed to the preservation of Paiute history and culture. Her seminal work, Indians of Coo-Yu-Ee Pah (Pyramid Lake): The History of Pyramid Lake Indians in Nevada, first published in 1974, provides a comprehensive account of the Pyramid Lake Paiute Tribe Reservation.

== Early life ==
Harnar was born on June 8, 1905, in Wadsworth, Nevada, on the Pyramid Lake Paiute Tribe Reservation. She is Northern Paiute. Harnar was the daughter of James and Margie Patrick Shaw. Hanar's father, known by his Paiute name, Makes Dust When He Walks, was the sole survivor of an ambush by cavalry at Cane Springs in 1865. He was ten years old. This event led to the loss of nearly all of his family. Afterwards, he was taken to Fort Churchill and later given to a livery stable owner named David Shaw in Dayton, Nevada. Under Shaw's care, Makes Dust When He Walks was renamed James Shaw and received an education. James Shaw eventually returned to the Pyramid Lake Reservation, where he became a deputy police officer and raised a large family, including nine children. His decision to have many children was, in part, a defiant act against the historical attempts to erase his people.

While attending day school in Wadsworth, Harnar absorbed the songs and stories of her tribe from the community elders. Harnar continued her education at the Carson Indian School, and later graduated from Carson City High School. She furthered her studies at Haskell Institute. During her college years, Harnar intermittently quit school and worked to support herself before eventually earning a B.A. in elementary education from Northern Arizona University in 1936.

== Career ==
Harnar's teaching career began at the Indian Colony School in Washoe County, Nevada, where she was the inaugural teacher for the first three grades. Two years later, she joined the United States Indian Service as a teacher, working with Native American communities across the Western United States, including the Pima in Arizona, Northern Shoshone in Wyoming, and Navajo in New Mexico. She pursued further education through courses at the University of Kansas, Oklahoma Agricultural and Mechanical College, and the University of California. Harnar was a schoolteacher for 37 years. Her career culminated with a long tenure at the Stewart Indian School in Carson City, Nevada, where she taught for 29 years and met her husband, a Cherokee from Oklahoma. At the Stewart Indian School, Harnar was a teacher and later a guidance counselor.

Harnar helped write Our Desert Friends, a booklet on the history and culture of Nevada's Native American communities. It was distributed by the Nevada Department of Education. She served as a member and past president of the capital branch of the American Association of University Women and was also a member of Delta Kappa Gamma. Her contributions to the field of education and Native American history were recognized when she was chosen to speak at the Nevada Intertribal Indian Conference in 1964.

In 1965, Harnar completed a M.A. in history at the University of Nevada, Reno, with a thesis titled, The History of the Pyramid, which she dedicated to her people. Shortly upon its completion, she read the thesis to her tribe in the Northern Paiute language. Her seminal work, Indians of Coo-Yu-Ee Pah (Pyramid Lake): The History of Pyramid Lake Indians in Nevada, first published in 1974 by Dave's Printing and Publishing and later reissued in 1978 by Western Printing and Publishing, provides a comprehensive account of the Pyramid Lake Paiute people. She began writing this book as part of her master's thesis. She recognized literary achievements of earlier Native American writers, such as Sarah Winnemucca who greatly influenced her work. Harnar's research involved accessing historical files at the Stewart Indian School and the Bureau of Indian Affairs.

== Personal life ==
Harnar was baptized and confirmed in the Episcopal Church and married Curtis Sequoyah Harnar, with whom she had a son, Curtis Jr. After retiring, she and her husband returned to live on the Pyramid Lake Reservation, where she died in 1985 in Reno, Nevada. Harnar's legacy is carried on by her son, Curtis Harnar, who republished her book in 2023. The initiative was spurred by Billie Jean Guerrero, Curtis' second cousin and director of the Pyramid Lake Paiute Tribe Museum and Visitors Center, alongside support from the Pyramid Lake Paiute Tribal Council.
