= Sedition (disambiguation) =

Sedition is a law term meaning to inspire insurrection.

It also is used in entertainment:

- Sedition (album), by New Zealand Metal band Dawn of Azazel
- Sedition (Jericho episode), an episode from the television show Jericho
- Sedition art, an online platform for artists to display and sell their art in digital format
