= OCP (film) =

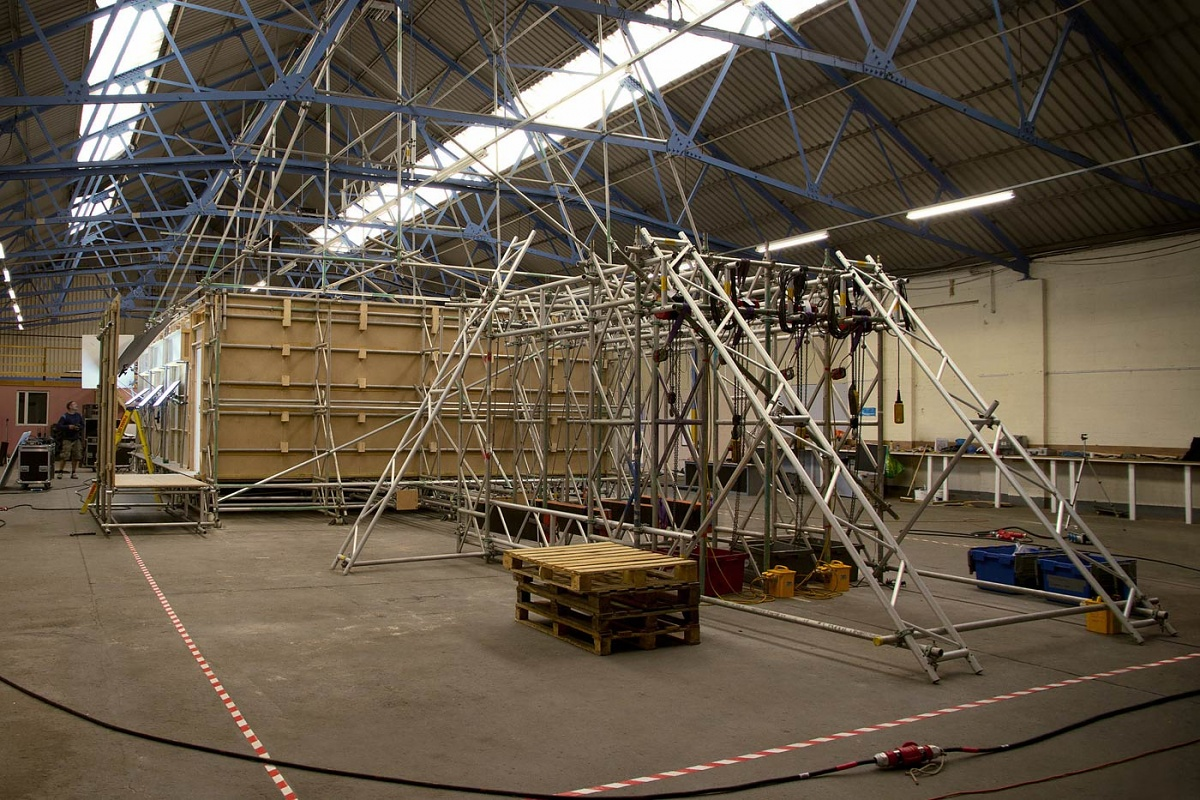
View of the set with weights used to capture the imagery of OCP in London.

OCP is a 2013 video artwork by Mitch Stratten. The performance taking place inside an elaborate three tonne moving set allowed a puppeteer to synchronise the space with the unpredictable movement of the three characters contained from one button. Engineering, construction and testing took place in a North London warehouse over three months preceding the film shoot completed in two days. The score was composed by Mitch Stratten (also known as Nodern) and mastered by Denis Blackham in the Isle of Skye. The ambitious project had a modest budget of GBP 24,000 based on its IMDb entry.

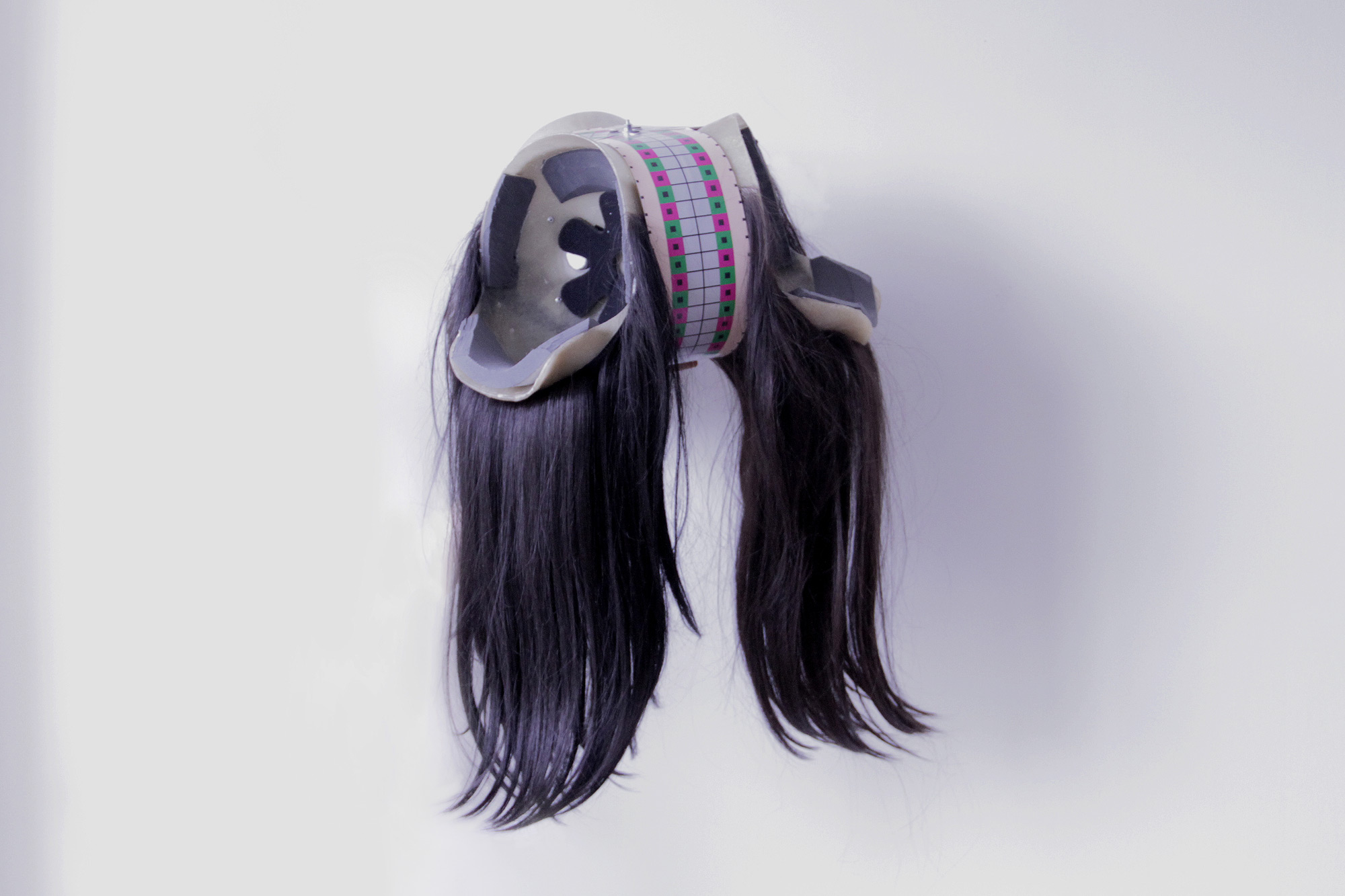
A prosthetic headpiece supported the spider walk of the performers.

OCP was first released on the Sedition distribution platform curated online. The reception to OCP was positive and polarised with critical reviews from “an imaginative feat” to “brave beyond definition” and “genius”. OCP has been shown by art institutions globally including Museo Nacional de Colombia, Wexner Center for the Arts Ohio and EYE film-museum Amsterdam. The work integrates ideas on language and folklore. OCP is the abbreviation for orifice conditioning plate, a piece of equipment used in the mining industry that turns the asymmetrical flow of liquid in pipes symmetrical to monitor performance.
