= Fostex =

Japanese manufacturer of audio equipment

- Native name: フォスター電機株式会社
- Traded as: TYO: 6794
- Industry: Electrical equipment
- Founded: June 1, 1948; 78 years ago (as Foster Electric Company, Ltd.); 1973 (as Fostex)
- Founders: Shigeaki Nishimura; Hiroaki Hagiwara
- Headquarters: Akishima City, Tokyo, Japan
- Key people: Hirozo Yoshizawa (President and CEO)
- Products: Multitrack tape recorders; Digital multitrack recorders; Loudspeakers; Speaker components
- Number of employees: 50,000 (2019)
- Parent: Foster Electric Company
- Website: fostex.jp

Foster Denki KK (フォスター電機株式会社, Fosutā Denki kabushiki kaisha) is an electronics company that manufactures loudspeakers and audio equipment for other companies or sells them under the trade name Fostex. It is traded on the Tokyo Stock Exchange.

== Overview ==
Foster Denki supplies audio equipment as an OEM:

- speakers and headphones for Sennheiser, Sony, Yamaha, Denon, Nokia and Beats
- earphones for Apple's iPod and iPhone
- television speakers for the Toshiba REGZA television brand
- television speakers for Zenith System 3; early 1980s sets had speakers marked Foster Japan
- in-vehicle speakers for Clarion, Mitsubishi Motors, Honda, GM, Ford, Mercedes-Benz and others

== History ==
Foster Denki was founded in 1948 and became one of the largest OEM manufacturer of loudspeakers and transducer products worldwide. Fostex was then established in June 1973 to brand components manufactured by Foster Electric.

In 1978, Fostex started to develop speakers for professional use, becoming very well known in both consumer hi-fi and professional fields. Fostex 6301B was the company's most small powered monitor speaker for broadcast and professional use.

=== 1980s: Analog multitrack recorders ===
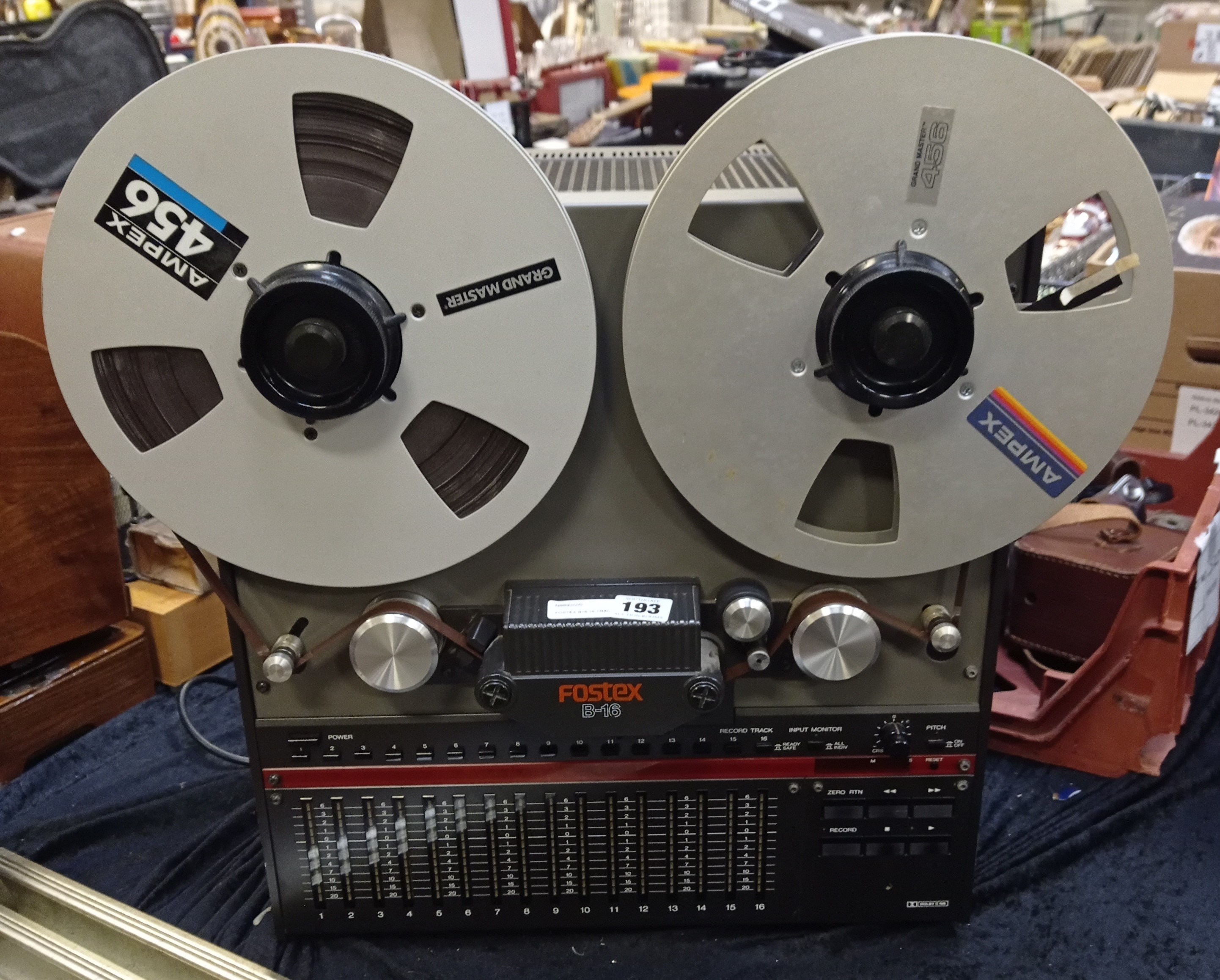
Fostex B-16 recorder

From 1981, Fostex and TASCAM pioneered affordable multitrack recording equipment, with Fostex producing the A-2 and the A-4 reel-to-reel recorders; the A-8 was the first eight-track recorder that used affordable ¼ inch tape, becoming a popular choice in the freelance and home recording field.

Fostex also produced a series of cassette multitrackers, including the popular four-track Fostex 250, which used standard cassettes running at double speed (3¾ ips), which improved high frequency response and dynamic range. To obtain four tracks from a standard cassette, all the four tracks available were used in one direction (normally, two tracks are used in each direction). Dolby C noise reduction was used.

In 1983, Fostex released the X-15, a portable, battery-powered, cassette-based four track recorder and the B-16, a very compact recorder which fitted 16 tracks onto ½ inch tape running at 15 ips speed. Dolby C was built into the machine as an option to overcome the technical limitations due to the narrow track format.

The B-16 was followed by the E-16 in 1986 and the G-16S in 1990, being the first recorder implementing the Dolby S noise reduction system. The G-24S was the last analogue multitrack machine, which fitted 24 tracks onto 1 inch tape and included built-in SMPTE/MIDI synchronization and a removable front panel remote control and meter bridge.

=== 1990s: Digital multitrack recorders ===
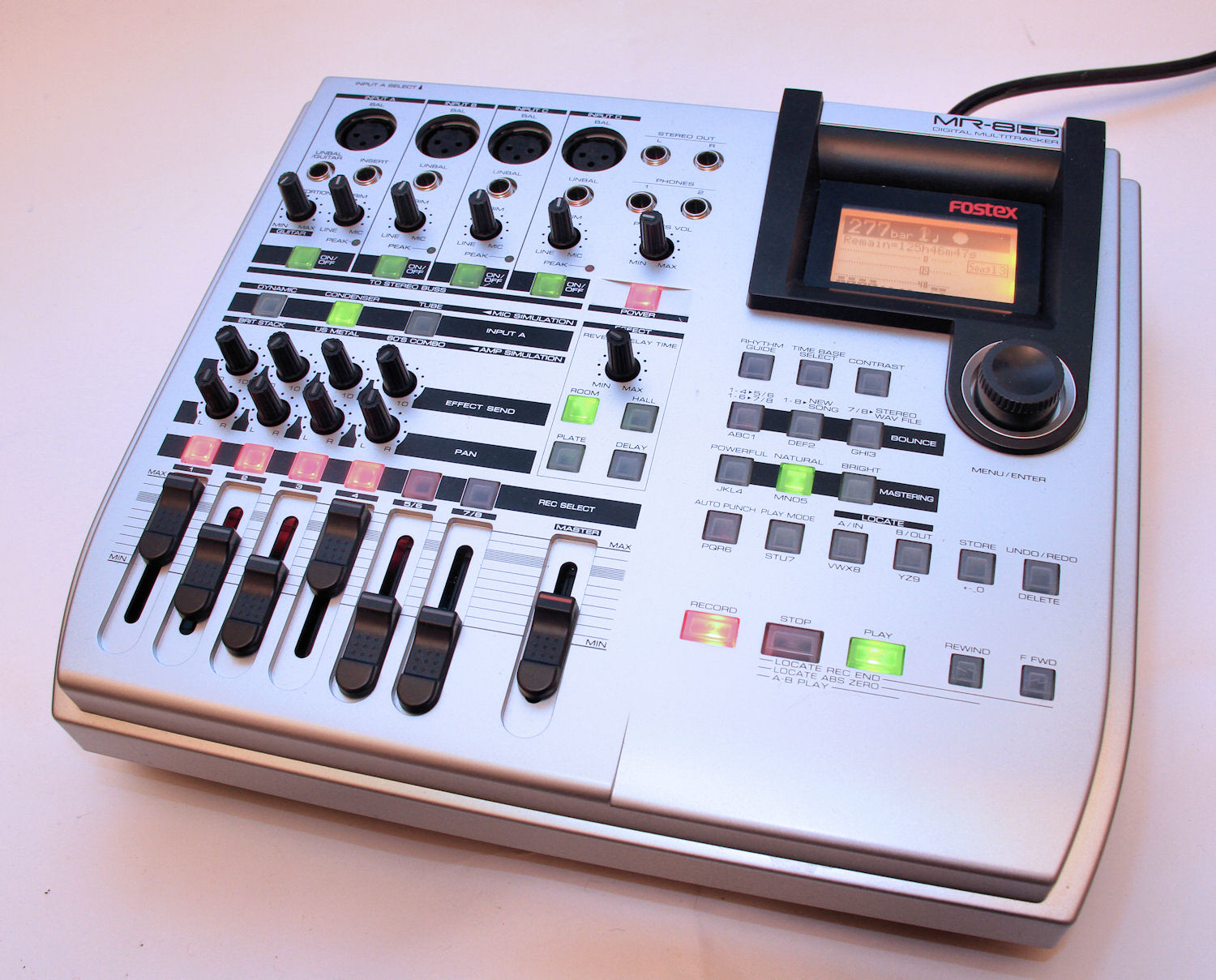
MR8 multitrack hard disk recorder (2003)

As digital technology progressed in the audio field, Fostex moved from analogue tape-based recorders to digital, drive-based recorders.

The Fostex DMT-8, released in 1995, was the first portable and affordable digital recorder. It provided eight tracks of 16-bit, 44.1kHz audio recorded to hard disk, non-destructive editing capabilities, a built-in metronome and MIDI clock output for synchronization with other machines. The FD-4 and FD-8 were variants which added support for Zip and SyQuest removable drives.

=== Present ===
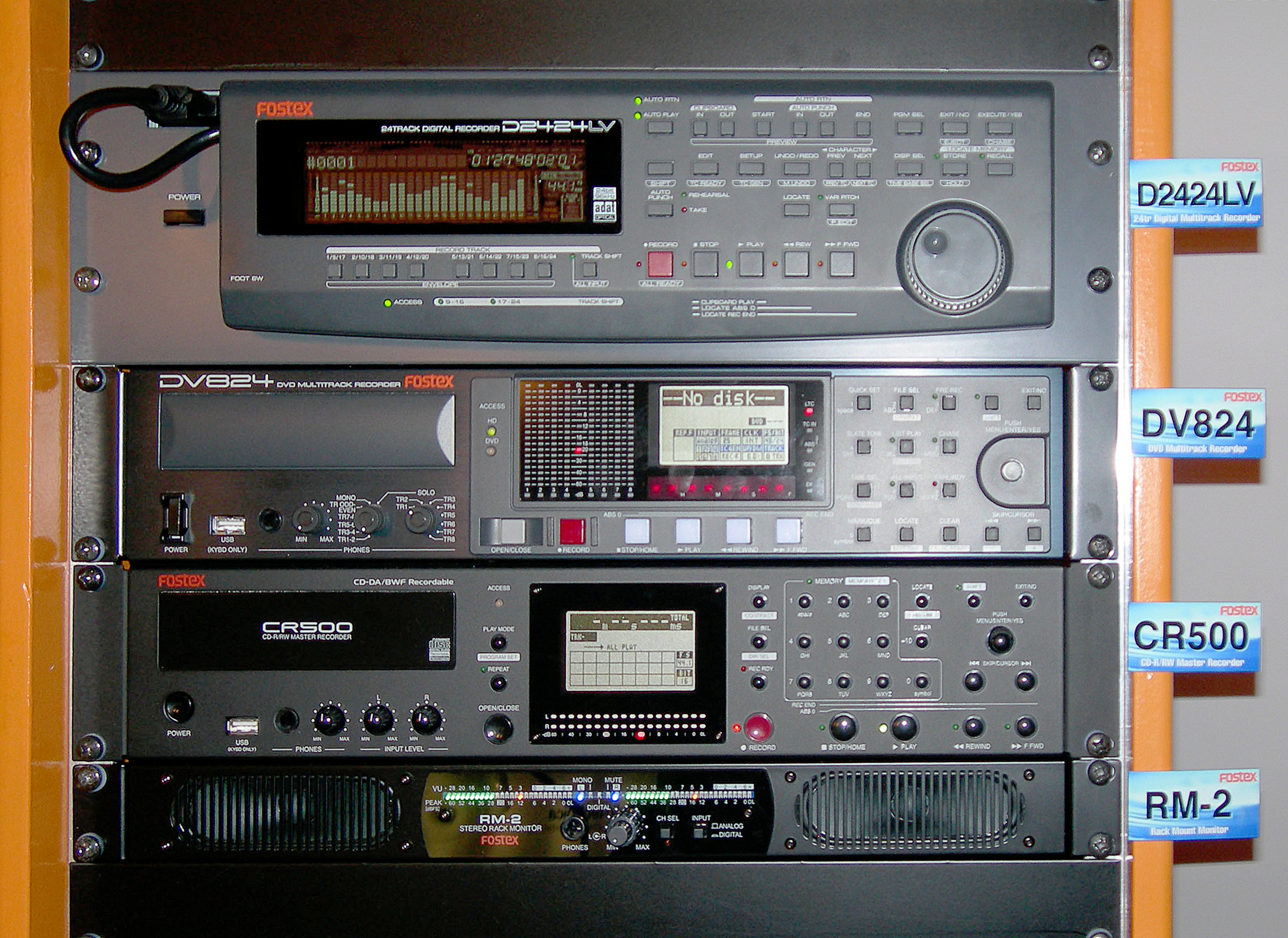
D2424LV 24-track hard disk recorder (2001), DV824 8-track DVD recorder (2004), CR500 CD-R/RW master recorder, RM-2 stereo rack monitor

Fostex's current product range includes digital multitrack recording equipment, loudspeaker drivers, studio monitors, microphones, and headphones.

Some production sound mixers for motion pictures use the Fostex Field Memory Recorder (FR-series and PD-series), which records audio and stores recordings as WAV files, as their recording device for sync sound.

Fostex has expanded its offering of hi-fi based products to include high-end headphones (TH-series), digital audio converters (HP series) and devices for portable listing. Fostex's T50RP model has become popular in headphone modification circles.
