= Nick Fudge =

British painter and digital artist

Nick Fudge (born 12 August 1961), also known as Nicholas Fudge (Chinese: 尼克•福吉), is a British painter, sculptor, and digital artist.

Fudge studied at Goldsmiths College, London, as a member of the Young British Artists (YBA) generation alongside Damien Hirst, Sarah Lucas, Liam Gillick, Gary Hume, and Michael Landy. His tutors Michael Craig-Martin and Jon Thompson expected comparable success until he destroyed all his artwork before his graduate show in 1988 and disappeared from the art world for twenty-five years. In 2016, The Times arts correspondent Jack Malvern dubbed him "The Lost YBA" upon his return.

== Education and influences ==
Fudge attended Christ's College, Finchley (1972–1977) alongside writer Will Self, leaving at sixteen to study graphic design at Barnet College. After graduating from Goldsmiths, he moved to the United States with poet Tracy Angel, earning an MFA from Tyler School of Art in Philadelphia. A formative road trip through the American West became "a kind of rebirth". His influences include Modernists Marcel Duchamp, Pablo Picasso, Francis Picabia, and Jasper Johns; writers T. S. Eliot and James Joyce; and digital technology.

== Work ==
During his self-imposed exile (1988–2016), Fudge created paintings and digital works in secret, sharing them only with a close circle.

=== Painting and sculpture ===
Fudge's oil paintings reinterpret Cubist and Abstract Expressionist works to interrogate painting's role in the digital age. His sculptures include "Old Masters Soaps" (Rembrandt sketches on soap bars) and "Picasso Drive", a crushed Citroën C4 Picasso installed at Hastings' Observer Building.

=== Digital art ===
In the early 1990s, Fudge began creating digital works after finding a Macintosh Classic II in a thrift store in Montana. He taught himself graphics software on the machine, which he shared with Angel for her poetry. His digital oeuvre remains stored on obsolete macOS hard drives, largely inaccessible today. The Berlin-based critic An Paenhuysen described these works as "post-internet... simultaneously dated and futuristic... modern, postmodern, and post-postmodern". A 2019 review noted: "Nick Fudge does a masterful digital reproduction. The Berlin artist lives out his penchant for Pablo Picasso, computers, painting and postmodernism on the laptop and with a brush. His painted pictures could just as well have been created on the computer. Only the intense gaze leads the viewer to Fudge's independently modernized Cubism. Fudge is the only exhibitor to establish the connection between PC and painting. He consistently follows tradition and logic, shows freedom of thought and creativity." In 2023, he joined Sedition, releasing collections like Picasso Pizazz (2024), which reworks Picasso's paintings through digital vectors.

== Exhibitions ==
=== Solo ===
- 2024: Picasso Pizazz, Sedition Art (online)
- 2024: PataPaint, Lop Nor Desert, China (curated by Zhou Yi 周翊)
- 2023: Destruction of Appearance, Sedition Art
- 2018: Undo Redo Return, HSBC HQ, London
- 2016: Reality Drive: Escape Velocity, Fitzrovia Gallery, London
- 2016: Reality Drive, Observer Arts, Hastings
- 1994: Materials for Nothing, Temple Art Gallery, Philadelphia (MFA thesis)

=== Group ===
- 2024: Semi-Manual Era, Gravity Art Museum, Beijing (curated by Zhou Yi 周翊)
- 2024: Apollo's Decathlon, Château de Montsoreau, France
- 2024: Future Paint, Kelly-McKenna Gallery, USA (co-curated by Fudge)
- 2021: Digital Divide II, Hilbert Raum, Berlin
- 2019: Digital Divide, Kunstverein Speyer, Germany
- 1992: Fifth Anniversary Exhibition, Karsten Schubert, London (curated by Michael Landy)

== Publications ==
- Pan, Lara (2024). "Future Paint: Nick Fudge's Emergence from the Underground". White Hot Magazine.
- Alimpiev, Vladislav (2024). "Reframing Modernism in the Digital Age". Sedition Art Magazine.
