= Mitch Stratten =

English director, writer, composer

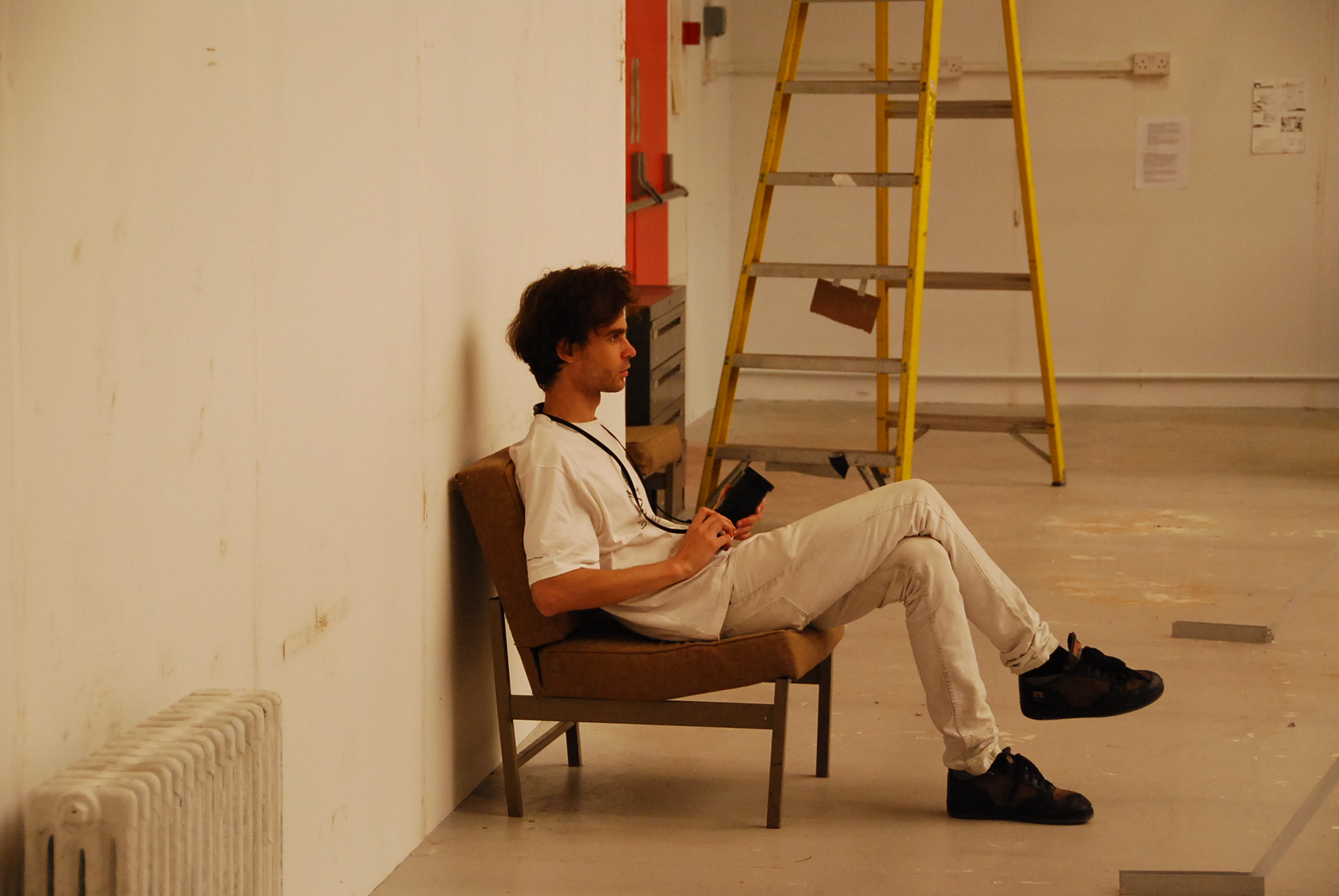
- Mitch Stratten on L Stage Pinewood Studios.
- Occupations: Writer, director, composer

Mitch Stratten is a director, sculptor, composer and writer based in the United Kingdom.

Stratten is best known for the "mash-cut” album Nodern Loves You released on Sub Rosa records and the world record breaking commercial entitled "Time Sculpture" for the Toshiba corporation. Mitch Stratten has also received recognition for the "boundary-blurring" video art project OCP which was first launched online from the Sedition curated distribution platform.
