= Robert Norton =

Robert Norton may refer to:

== Politicians ==
- Robert Norton (Leicester MP) (fl. 1381) represented Leicester (UK Parliament constituency)
- Robert Norton (British politician), British Conservative politician
- Robert Norton (parliamentarian) (fl. 1386), MP for Warwick (UK Parliament constituency)
- Robert Norton (Virginia politician), former slave and member of the Virginia House of Delegates

== Others ==
- Robert Norton (boxer) (born 1972), British boxer
- Bob Norton (Robert Cecil York Norton; 1922–1992), Australian dentist
- Robert Norton (typographer) (1929–2001), printer and publisher
- Robert E. Norton (born 1960), American historian
- Robert L. Norton, American engineer, academic and author
