= Dawn of Azazel =

New Zealand death metal band

- Origin: Auckland, New Zealand
- Genres: Death metal, deathcore, technical death metal
- Years active: 1997–2010, 2013–present
- Label: Ibex Moon Records
- Members: Rigel Walshe; Joe Bonnett; Jeremy Suckling; Nik Davies
- Past members: Tony Angelov; Tony Corry; Tom James; Phill Osborne Martin Cavanagh

Dawn of Azazel is a death metal band from New Zealand. They have played around the world in countries such as U.S., Switzerland, Spain, Portugal, Ireland, Czech Republic, Denmark, the United Kingdom, Germany, the Netherlands, Belgium, France, Austria, Thailand, Indonesia and Australia. In February 2008, it was announced that Martin Cavanagh would depart the band. Shortly after, he was replaced with Jeremy Suckling of Wellington deathcore band Scoria. Dawn of Azazel have finished recording a new album entitled Relentless, to be released on 13 October on Unique Leader Records. The album was recorded at Mana Studios in Florida and Brian Elliott produced it.

== Media coverage ==
In 2005, it was reported that vocalist Rigel Walshe was a constable in the New Zealand Police, with questions being raised about the contrast between his job as a public servant and the violent lyrics in Dawn of Azazel CDs. No official action was taken as his police work and singing careers were kept separate.

== Previous lineups ==
=== Law of the Strong Lineup – 2001–2004 ===
- Rigel Walshe – vocals; Bass guitar
- Joe Bonnett- Guitar
- Tony Angelov – Guitar
- Phil Osbourne – drums

Sedition Lineup 2004 – 2008

- Rigel Walshe – vocals; Bass guitar
- Joe Bonnett – guitar
- Martin Cavanagh – drums

Relentless (2009)

- Rigel Walshe – vocals; Bass guitar
- Joe Bonnett – guitar
- Jeremy Suckling – drums

Personnel

- Brian Elliott – Record Producer

== Current lineup ==
- Rigel Walshe – vocals; bass
- Nik Davies - Guitar

== Discography ==
Date	Title	Label	Charted	Country	Catalog Number
Albums
January 2004	Law of the Strong	Agonia Records	–	–	–
October 2005	Sedition	Extreme Imprints	–	–	–
October 2009	Relentless	Unique Leader Records	–	–	–
April 2015	The Tides of Damocles	Extreme Imprint	–	–	–
Demos
1999	Of Bloodshed And Eternal Victory	Independent	–	New Zealand	–
2000	Vita est Militia Super Terram	Independent	–	New Zealand	–

=== Singles ===
Year	Single	Album	Charted	Certification
2002	"Bloodforged Abdication"	Hellflame	–	–
