= Space Chair =

British television and cinema advertisement launched by Toshiba

- a frame from Space Chair
- Agency: Grey London
- Client: Toshiba
- Language: English
- Running time: 60 seconds
- Product: Regza SD LCD television Satellite T130 laptop computer
- Release date: November 16, 2009
- Directed by: Andy Amadeo
- Production company: Hungry Man
- Produced by: Matt Buels
- Country: United Kingdom
- Budget: £3,000,000 (campaign)
- Preceded by: Time Sculpture
- Official website: http://www.toshiba.co.uk/innovation

Space Chair is a British television and cinema advertisement launched by Toshiba in 2009 to promote its Regza SD LCD televisions. The 60-second piece, following the launch of an armchair into near space attached to a weather balloon, is the second in the "Projects" campaign, following on from Time Sculpture. The launch, which reached 98,268 feet (29,952 m), set a world record for Highest High-Definition Television Commercial. Space Chair premiered on European and Japanese television on 16 November 2009.

== Synopsis ==
The piece opens with a panning shot across a bleak desert, the Sun low over a mountain range on the horizon. Electronic swells play on the soundtrack over the ambient noise; there is no speech. In the foreground is an armchair with orange upholstery. This cuts to an overhead shot taken from above the chair as a team of handlers release it, and then to a shot revealing the balloon the chair is attached to. A series of beeps from the GPS tracker begins to sound as the chair rises from the ground, and a sequence of shots from on board the balloon rig show the contraption climbing higher and higher above the ground. A car races across the desert below, raising clouds of dust. As the altitude of the chair rises, the wind begins to whistle and the curvature of the Earth becomes apparent. The chair rises to the very edge of space, and the campaign strapline, "Armchair viewing, redefined" appears as the view withdraws to show the advertised product (an LCD television or a laptop, depending on the version) and the Toshiba logo. In the closing seconds of the piece, the camera cuts back to the chair as the balloon shatters with an audible pop and the chair begins to disintegrate as it falls to the ground.

== Production ==
=== Background ===
In latter part of the 2000s, Toshiba were engaged in the high definition optical disc format war, in which it supported the HD DVD format. In 2007, Toshiba decided to consolidate its European advertising ventures with a single advertising agency, where previously it had split its £25,000,000 marketing budget between Lowe, Saatchi & Saatchi, Grey Global Group and Young & Rubicam. In June 2007, Grey won the account with a pitch based around emphasising Toshiba's history in research and development, pushing the company's image as an "innovator in the field". The first television and cinema commercial from the partnership, Light, lighter, aired in January 2008, to a lukewarm reception.

The mediocre campaign made Grey to reevaluate its approach, and lead to a plan for advertisements "pushing the boundaries of what was possible."; the first of which was Time Sculpture, was released in late 2008. Time Sculpture broke a Guinness World Record for the highest number of moving image cameras in a film sequence, and subsequently won a number of advertising industry awards, and the Midsummer Awards.

=== Artistic concept ("Escape Vehicle No. 6") ===
Artist Simon Faithfull, commissioned by The Arts Catalyst in 2004 for the Artists' Airshow, made the film "Escape Vehicle No. 6". This film was later exhibited in Faithfull's solo show "Gravity Sucks" at the British Film Institute in London.

Toshiba liked the idea of taking Faithfull's work, showing the launch of a chair into the upper atmosphere, and re-filming it in high-definition using Toshiba technology. A working budget of £3,000,000 was given for the campaign.

=== Pre-production ===
Director of photography Haris Zambarloukos, known for his work on Enduring Love and Mamma Mia!, was asked for advice on how to film the ascent. Zambarloukos consulted with the specialist camera company Polecam, who advised that the only 1080i HD camera which would be small, light and robust enough was one developed by Toshiba itself, the Toshiba IK-HR1S. The IK-HR1S was not available to the general public, and was mostly used for military reconnaissance or endoscopic surgery.

For the balloon and its associated rig, JP Aerospace, who had done similar work for the Discovery Channel and National Geographic Channel, were contracted. With the commercial airtime (broadcasting) already purchased, no-one willing to insure the project due to the high risks. Three back-up rigs were available as JP Aerospace considered the balloon rigs could come down in areas up 600 miles (970 km) away,

=== Production ===
JP Aerospace faced several obstacles in the construction of the balloon rigs. The pre-purchasing of the commercial airtime left only four months for production, where normally the company would spend over a year assembling components. Since the shoot was to take place in the Black Rock Desert in Nevada, United States, it would fall under the purview of the Federal Aviation Administration, whose regulations stipulated that the entire craft weigh no more than 4 pounds (1.8 kg), in case of collisions with aircraft. This weight restriction meant that the cameras could not be equipped to transmit footage back to base, so the rig had to be hardy enough to survive re-entering at over Mach 1 and striking the ground. To accomplish this, the rig was equipped with a lightweight parachute, and the equipment racks and camera boom were designed to collapse on impact, reducing damage to the cameras. The weight restriction also meant that a model chair had to be used in place of an actual armchair. The model, constructed of hollowed balsa wood and lightweight fabric, was designed by special effects company Artem for around £2,500.

The rigs were launched on the weekend of 26 September 2009, twelve miles (19 km) northeast of Gerlach, Nevada. Set-up began two hours before sunrise, with a crew of twelve from JP Aerospace assembling the 900 MHz antennae which would track the GPS signal from the rigs, inflating the balloons under canvas covers, and performing checks on the equipment. Each rig was equipped with two cameras, and each camera was equipped with different lenses and set at different angles to capture 512 GB of unique footage each.

Two launches were scheduled for the first day. Each launch required someone to pull a canvas rip panel, releasing the balloon, while four people guided the chair and camera rig across the ground to a position underneath the rising balloon. The first rig partially collapsed on take-off, but it remained intact enough to rise for over 82 minutes, reaching a height of 98,268 ft before the balloon shattered and the rig fell for around half an hour before hitting ground. At one point during the ascent, telemetry from the rig recorded a temperature of −60 °F (−51 °C) before the air became too thin to dissipate heat effectively and the temperature rose again. The cameras on both of the first two rigs were offline, but usable footage was recovered from the second launch, albeit slightly overexposed. Two additional launches were made the following day, with the fourth re-capturing footage unrecoverable from previous launches. Despite the four balloons reaching heights of 98,268 feet (29,952 m), 93,000 feet (28,000 m), 94,000 feet (29,000 m) and 82,000 feet (25,000 m) all of the rigs and cameras were recovered within twelve miles (19 km) of the launch site. The launch reaching 98,268 ft set a new world record for Highest High-Definition Television Commercial. In all, 16 hours of footage were recorded and handed to The Mill for post production. Knowing that many viewers would suspect the piece was constructed from computer-generated imagery, imperfections such as the supporting wires and spots of lens dust were left in to lend an air of authenticity.

== Release and reception ==
Grey London created an online presence for the campaign. An interactive website, "wherewillitland.com" was launched and promoted through social networking websites such as Twitter and Facebook. The site allowed consumers to make guesses as to where the launched chairs would land, with the winner receiving a 46 inch Regza SV Series LCD TV. Additional content, including a making-of documentary, was made available at a dedicated section of the Toshiba UK website.

Space Chair premiered on European and Japanese television on 16 November 2009, for a period of three weeks. After a break of several months, a slightly re-cut version of Space Chair was used to promote Toshiba's Satellite T laptop computers. The campaign received mixed reactions; while it received more than half a million hits online within days of its launch, Noel Bussey of Campaign magazine said of Space Chair: "The idea, execution, astounding shots of Earth and the 'making of' video are all superb." However, Damon Collins, executive creative director at Young & Rubicam was less impressed with the piece, commenting: "I salute the clients and team for trying something different, [...] but, if pushed, the result still reminded me a little of a Sony ad from about ten years ago where the guy fell from the sky in his armchair." Toshiba, however, were fairly satisfied with the campaign and entered talks with JP Aerospace about a similar commercial in 2010.
