= Regza =

Japanese brand of televisions

Regza (stylized REGZA) is a brand of televisions currently made by Japanese company TVS REGZA Corporation based in Kawasaki, Kanagawa, a subsidiary of Chinese company Hisense. It was formerly the sub-brand of flat-panel TVs from Toshiba and is now only marketed in Japan and number of other countries.

== Name ==
The name REGZA comes from the German word Regsam meaning "dynamism." Additionally, the backronym "Real Expression Guaranteed by amaZing Architecture" is also used.

== History ==
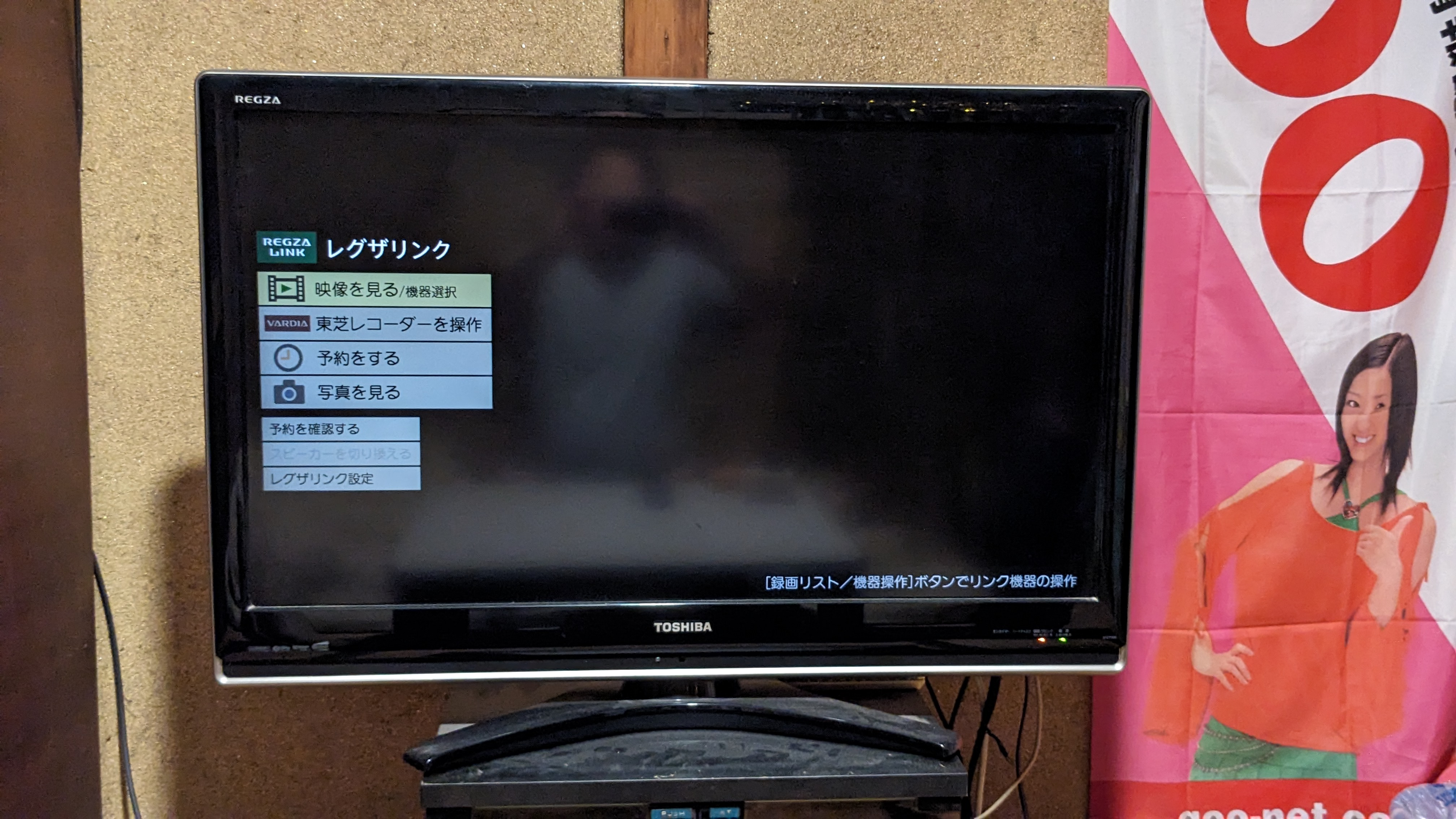
A 37" Toshiba Regza LCD TV from 2008

Toshiba introduced REGZA on February 21, 2006 at the Mandarin Oriental, Tokyo, to serve as a global umbrella name for its flat-panel televisions. The sub-brand strategy was also made to mirror the competitors' Aquos and Bravia names and Toshiba had previously only used the sub-brand Face in Japan but not globally.

Most Regza TVs were liquid-crystal display (LCD) but briefly around 2006-2007 also some plasma display (PDP) models were made.

The Regza brand was dropped in North America in about 2010, then disappeared in European markets in 2012, both replaced by simply Toshiba (Toshiba exited both TV markets entirely in 2015 and 2016 respectively, licensing its brand name to Compal and Vestel respectively). Domestic production ended in 2012 with the closure of a plant in Fukaya, Saitama and in the same year significantly reduced overall production worldwide of TVs.

On February 28, 2018, Chinese TV manufacturer Hisense purchased Toshiba's television division (Toshiba Visual Solutions) including patents and the global rights to the Toshiba and REGZA names for 40 years. Toshiba retains a 5% stake in the company. Toshiba Visual Solutions Corporation was renamed to TVS REGZA Corporation in 2021 to distance itself further from the Toshiba conglomerate. Since then, new high-end TV models have gradually shifted away from Toshiba branding to solely REGZA.

In August 2025, Toshiba and Regza marked a return to the Singapore market after a decade.

== Notable TVs ==
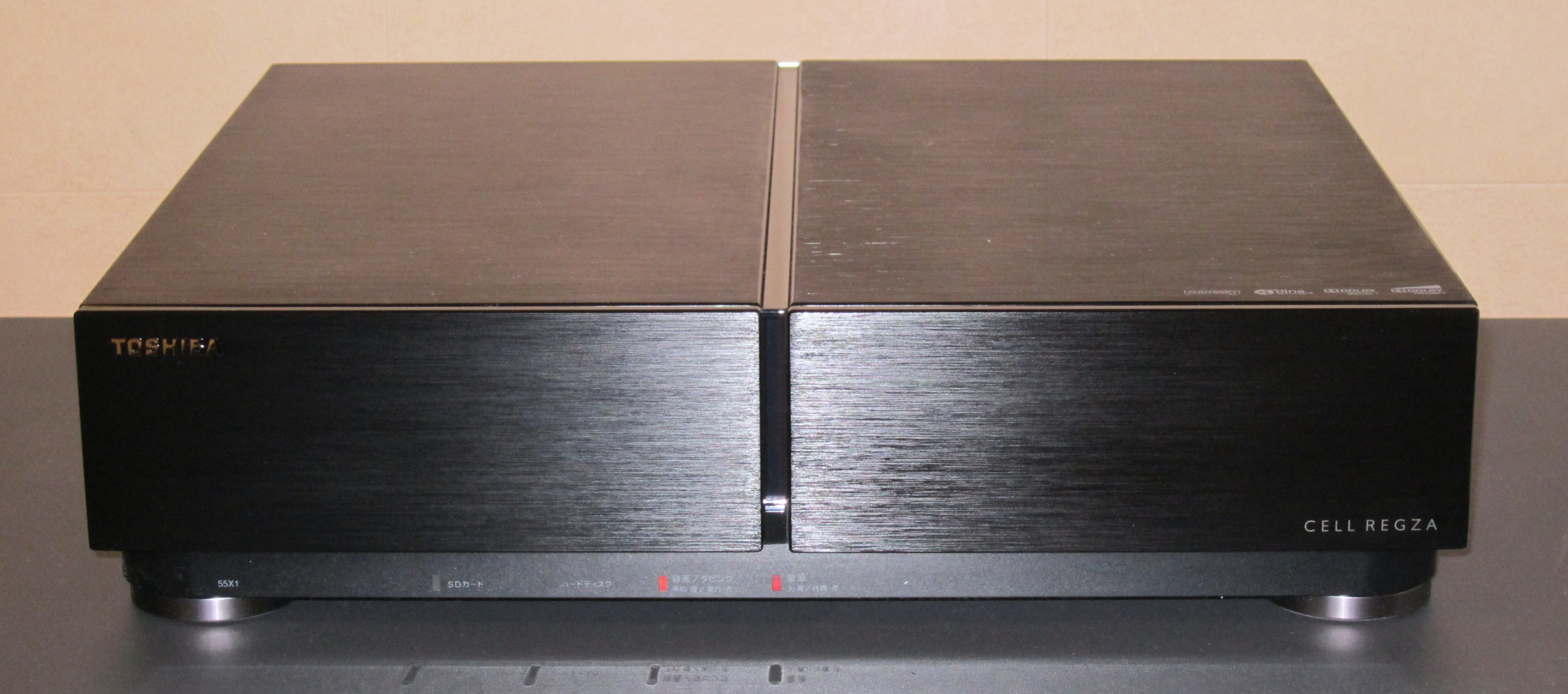
Toshiba REGZA CELL BOX 55X1 tuner part of the Cell-powered REGZA LCD TV from 2009

In October 2009, Toshiba unveiled a high-end model called Cell Regza 55X1 that uses the Cell processor best known for its use in PlayStation 3. It had a 55" LCD display with LED backlight, 5,000,000:1 contrast ratio, 3 TB of digital recording storage and costed the equivalent of $11,000.

In October 2010, Toshiba unveiled the Toshiba Regza GL1 21" LED-backlit LCD TV glasses-free 3D prototype at CEATEC 2010, the first ever glasses-free 3D TV. This system supports 3D capability without glasses (utilizing an integral imaging system of 9 parallax images with a vertical lenticular sheet). The retail product was released in December 2010.

In December 2011, the Rezga 55X3 was released in Japan as the world's first commercially released 4K UHD television. It also had a glasses-free 3D display again.

At CES 2022, Regza launched the REGZA Engine ZRα, a dedicated hardware AI accelerator implemented in many of the newer televisions for upscaling and optimizing video, including millimeter wave radar sensing to adjust video and audio based on where the viewer is placed.

== Models (European market) ==
The European range mostly aligned with the Asia-Pacific lines whereas Japan used its own designations and North America had a separate one too, which consisted of series like HL, LX, HM and G while a Cinema branded series was offered as a high end range for home theater use. The initial Toshiba REGZA models launched in 2006 for Europe were the WLT66 and WLT68 (or WL66 and WL68 with analogue tuners). These were HD ready sets with early iterations of Toshiba's Active Vision picture processing. From February 2007, the REGZA line was expanded to compromise the C series (mainstream), X series (first with 1080p displays) and the Z series (top of the line).

In 2008, the REGZA naming designation for Europe was changed into an alphabetic tier system ranging from the entry-level AV to RV (1080p), XV (100Hz processing), ZV (200Hz processing) and the flagship SV (LED-backlit and the first TV in the region with Full Array Local Dimming). From 2010, Toshiba phased out CCFL backlights in favour of LED and its thinner designs. The range was refreshed into: SL and VL series of slim Edge-Lit LED, higher end UL and XL series, and premium flagship YL and WL series that featured CEVO processing engine. After 2012, Toshiba abandoned the REGZA branding in this market.

== Marketing ==
In 2008 and 2009, Toshiba endeavored in two high-profile British-made TV commercials, Time Sculpture and Space Chair, that aired across Europe and Japan in promotion of REGZA.

== Market share ==
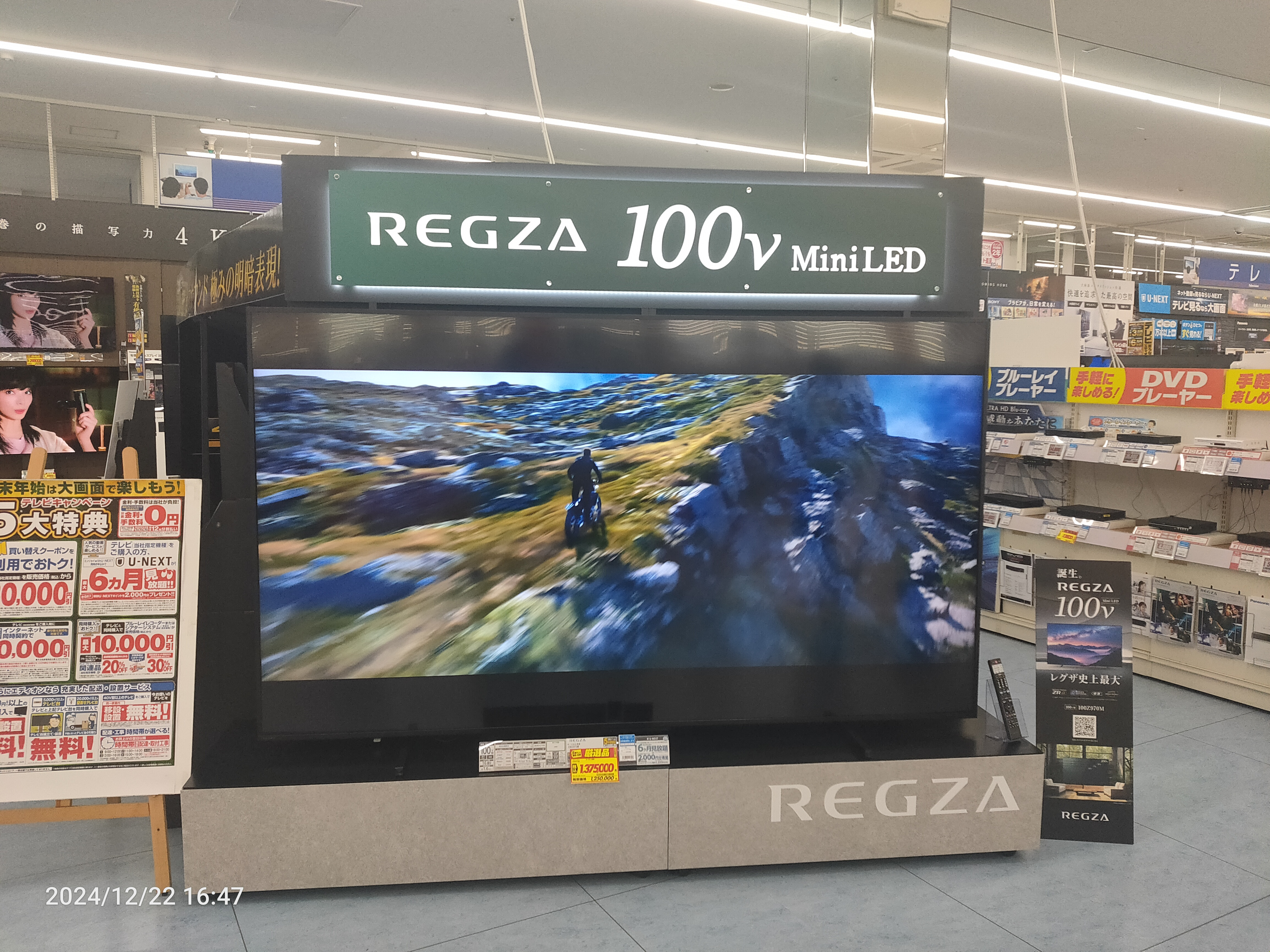
Regza 100V Mini LED LCD television, 2024

Toshiba held approximately 8% global market share in the LCD TV market in 2008. While the Regza line had a solid mid-tier presence in most regions, in Japan it was a significant top-tier player. Its domestic market share reached nearly 20% in 2009. It also attracted enough buyers there into its ultra high-end products such as their Cell TV and the glasses-free 3D TV.

In 2022, Regza overtook Sharp to become the leading television brand in Japan for the first time, with a market share of 24%. It has maintained this position as of 2026 with a share of 25%.

== Non-TV products ==
The Regza brand has also been used on other products from 2010 onwards for HDD and Blu-ray recorders and players. REGZA has also been used in Android-based smartphones that were developed by Fujitsu Toshiba Mobile Communications.

== See also ==
- Aquos
- Bravia
- Viera
