= Sedition (album) =

Studio album by Dawn of Azazel
- Released: October 2005 (NZ) ?, 2006 (USA & Europe)
- Genre: Death metal
- Labels: Extreme Imprints (NZ); Ibex Moon Records (USA & Europe)

Dawn of Azazel chronology
Law Of The Strong (2004)	Sedition (2005)

Professional ratings
Review scores
Source	Rating
AllMusic	2/5 stars

Sedition is the second album released by New Zealand death metal band Dawn of Azazel. It was released in October, 2005 in New Zealand, on Extreme Imprints. It was also released in United States and Europe in 2006 on Ibex Moon Records. It was the first studio album to feature Martin Cavanagh on drums.

== Track listing ==
1. Spare None – 3:23
2. Swathed in Impurity – 3:19
3. The Road to Babalon – 2:42
4. Descent into Eminence – 4:17
5. Villainy Endures – 2:44
6. Sedition – 3:07
7. Violence and Uncleanliness – 2:10
8. Sin (Amongst the Kings) – 4:20
9. Master of the Strumpets – 3:05

== Personnel ==
- Rigel Walshe – vocals, bass guitar
- Joe Bonnett – guitar
- Martin Cavanagh – drums
