= Time Sculpture =

- A frame from Time Sculpture
- Agency: Grey London
- Client: Toshiba
- Language: English
- Running time: 60 seconds
- Product: HD-DVD upscaling
- Release date: 10 November 2008
- Directed by: Mitch Stratten
- Music by: "Air War" (Crystal Castles)
- Production company: Hungry Man
- Produced by: Rebecca Pople (agency) Sally Newsom (production company)
- Country: United Kingdom
- Budget: £3,000,000 (campaign)
- Official website: http://www.toshiba.co.uk/upscaling

Time Sculpture is a British television and cinema advertisement launched in 2008 to promote Toshiba's high-definition television upscaling technology. The piece, which comprised a collection of interacting loops sequenced into a moving shot, was created in collaboration with advertising agency Grey London, based on a video art proposal by director Mitch Stratten. Time Sculpture holds the world record for the greatest number of moving image cameras used in a single shot.

Time Sculpture was directed by Mitch Stratten and the shoot was handled by production company Hungry Man with post-production completed by The Mill in London. Time Sculpture was recognised for its innovation from within and outside of the advertising and television industries and garnered various awards including a Clio Award, a London International Award and a GTC Award.

== Sequence ==
Time Sculpture opens with a fixed camera view of an undecorated art studio. On the open floor is a chair and a platform trolley. A man and a woman walk into frame from left and right respectively. The man falls to the floor and begins doing push-ups. The woman holding a set of black cards walks to the centre, spins around and throws the cards in the air. The music ("Air War" by Crystal Castles) starts and the stationary camera begins to move to the right on a consistent circular track while the elements within frame, compiled from all angles in 360 degrees, loops back and forth at different timings in the same physical space, forming an interconnecting rhythmical pattern from the spontaneous movement captured. As more performers walk into frame some interact with props like basketballs, a pink flag and spilling two large cans of purple paint. A man encircling the group in a yellow raincoat jumps in beneath a paint spill before stepping onto the chair in a balancing act of backwards forwards movement as the music rises. The "flag" and "skateboard" men each pick up one of the balls now bouncing infinitely by themselves as a voiceover begins, stating: "When what we watch constantly redefines itself, shouldn't how we watch it do the same?" The piece closes with the Toshiba logo, the motto "Leading Innovation" and a link to the company's upscaling website.

== Production ==
=== Background ===
The second half of the 2000s (decade) saw electronics conglomerate Toshiba engaged in the high definition optical disc format war, in which it supported the HD DVD format. In 2007, Toshiba made the decision to consolidate its European advertising ventures with a single advertising agency, where previously it had split its £25,000,000 marketing budget between Lowe, Saatchi & Saatchi, Grey Global Group, and Young & Rubicam. In June 2007, Grey won the account with a pitch based around emphasising Toshiba's history in research and development, pushing the company's image as an "innovator in the field". The first television and cinema commercial from the partnership, Light, lighter, aired in January 2008, to a lukewarm reception.

The middling results of the campaign caused Grey to re-evaluate its approach, leading to a new campaign, which would see an advertisement "push the boundaries of what was possible.” To this end, Grey London re-examined several proposals presented to them in the past which had been abandoned as unworkable, before deciding upon a concept which had been proposed by Mitch Stratten. The idea, inspired by Eadweard Muybridge, was to build on the "bullet time" technology pioneered by the Wachowskis in the feature film The Matrix, by replacing the stills cameras with moving image cameras to show movement not seen before as backward and forward simultaneously appose to the frozen moment of "dead time". The title “time sculpture” came to the director on the way to Grey London with his producer where they presented the project as a production and post-production blueprint.

=== Production ===
The idea had originally been put aside as unachievable for a singular reason: the project required a quantity of data unprecedented in a television commercial, and would be one of the biggest visual effects jobs ever undertaken by a commercial production company. After the technique was decided upon, the agency sourced a specific creative teams to collaborate with the director. They wanted to restrict using computer-generated imagery, and stuntwork would be kept to a minimum to maintain focus on the ordinary movements which would be seen in a completely new way through the technique. Based on early tests films of the director, a simple treatment was assembled. The piece would be set in an art school studio to "showcase creativity at its rawest" according to creative director Andy Amadeo. Timings of predeterminate movements of several performers were choreographed using computer simulations which also informed the set construction at Pinewood Studios where the shoot took place. Colour was used to isolate movement and enhance structure.

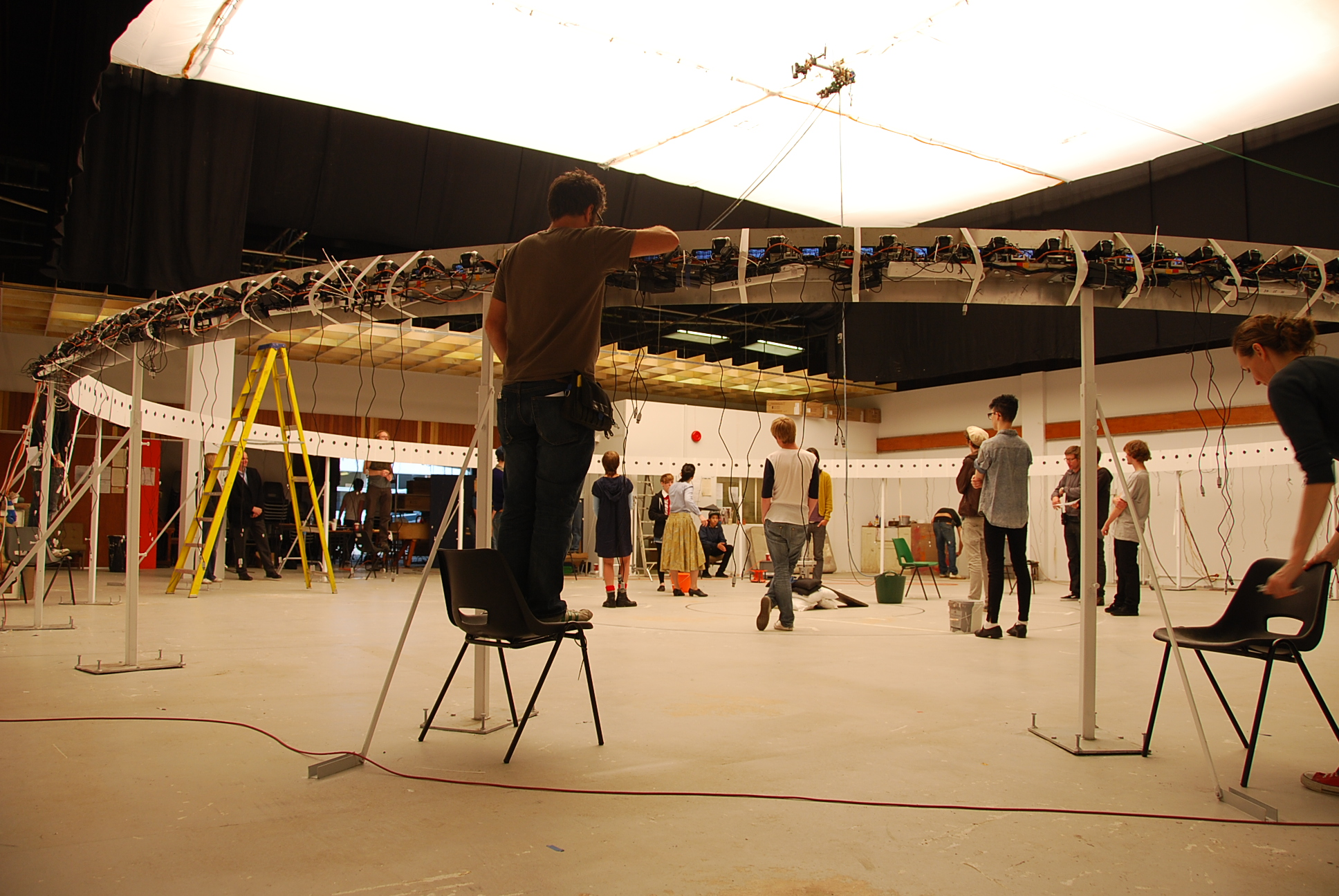
Technicians setting focus to the cameras secured to the circular system.

It took over a month and a half to assemble the engineering team who would work on creating the custom 360 moving image capture system. The rig which supported 200 Gigashot high-definition video cameras requisitioned from Toshiba, was 1.8 m-high and weighed over half a tonne. It was constructed in two halves, each covering 180 degrees of the inward view of a 14 m circular space in the centre of the constructed set. Once the rig itself was assembled, it took a team of four technicians three days to set the focus and alignment on all 200 cameras. Technology devised by electrical engineer Richard Glover was used to synchronously activate the entire system from a single remote control.

=== Post-production ===
Each of the fourteen performers in Time Sculpture were captured separately from all angles by the 200 cameras. The resulting 110 hours of high definition footage, representing around 20 Tb of data, took post-production three weeks to process, running 24 hours a day, resulting in 2,500,000 single frames. In addition, the director had designed the workflow with a custom Edit Decision List and editing application to manage the vast amount of footage in the edit room. Independent programmers were commissioned to create this software, for use by editing company The Whitehouse. The initial editing pass by editor Christophe Williams pared the film down to around 30 hours. The remaining data was passed back to The Mill, who began working on compositing the film using Flame. While on set, each half of the rig had been given one run individually to create a blank background to allow The Mill to remove the rig. While minimal CGI work was needed on Time Sculpture, minor modifications to details such as lighting were made using software including Baselight, Floctane, Smoke, and Autodesk Softimage.

== Release and reception ==
The final 60-second cut of Time Sculpture premiered on 10 November 2008 on terrestrial television channels ITV1, Channel 4 and on the satellite television channel Sky One. The full version aired for one week on terrestrial television, and for three weeks on Sky One, supported by 30-second cuts on Channel 4, Five, Sky, ITV1, and ITV4 through 17 November, followed by 20-second cuts on the same channels. This was accompanied by in-store retail promotions and by an online presence. In all, around £3,000,000 was spent on media purchases.

While Time Sculpture proved popular, attracting over 500,000 views on video sharing website YouTube in days, featured on most popular blogs and international news, reactions to the commercial from critics was mixed. Comparisons were made with other "bullet time" works such as The Matrix, and advertising criticisms were leveled that the piece lacked a "big idea". However, others were more complimentary; Noel Bussey of Campaign magazine commented: "Brave, interesting and expertly realised, this is a breath of fresh air, and a call to arms from an agency that has struggled with having a reputation for not doing interesting creative." The publication later went on to name it one of the top ten advertisements of the year. This was not the last honour Time Sculpture would receive; over the next few months it received honours from the D&AD Awards, the Clio Awards, and the Midsummer Awards. Time Sculpture was also selected for The New York Times Year In Ideas, quoting Mitch Stratten:

It's being able to manipulate time in a way we haven’t seen before, to be able to record it and edit it in a three-dimensional space. It’s a 4-D experiment; we are not locked to time.

— The New York Times

An alternate version of Time Sculpture was later exhibited by the director in London after it caught interest from the art world. The film also inspired other commercials and music videos. In 2009, it was recognised by the Guinness Book of World Records for having used the highest number of moving image cameras in a composite shot. Following the commercial success of Time Sculpture, Grey London and Toshiba decided to continue the campaign the following year, titled as Space Chair, with the aim to brake the world record for the highest television commercial shot in high-definition.
