= Nodern Loves You =

Nodern

Studio album by Mitch Stratten
- Genre: Experimental
- Length: 50:55
- Label: Subrosa
- Producer: Mitch Stratten

Nodern Loves You is a full-length music album arranged and recorded by artist and filmmaker Mitch Stratten (performing under the stage name Nodern) released on Sub Rosa records. Nodern Loves You was mastered by Denis Blackham in the Isle of Skye. The album artwork features a plain gold disc without any text visible through a partially black printed transparent sleeve.

Nodern Loves You was produced across three cities during a two year period. Critical acclaim from AllMusic described the album as "a variegated, provocative opus - rich in sonic detail and wordless imagery", while Robert Sandall cited its "intensity” on the BBC Radio 3 Sony Award nominated Mixing It show and Brainwashed called the album "a work that is borne of his own universe.”

A video short was made to accompany the album which "went viral” after it was featured on the popular website Boing Boing.
