= Robert L. Norton =

American engineer, academic and author (1939–2024)

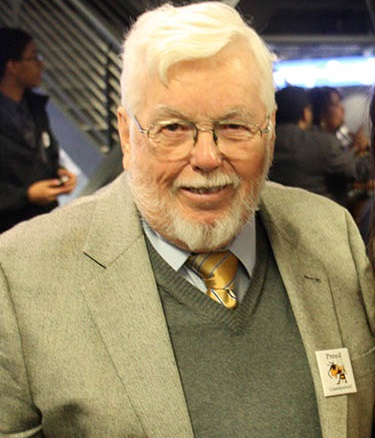
- Born: May 5, 1939; Boston, Massachusetts, U.S.
- Died: June 22, 2024 (aged 85)
- Occupations: Engineer, academic and author

Academic background
- Education: AS, Mechanical Engineering; BS, Industrial Technology; MS, Engineering Design; Northeastern University; Tufts University
- Thesis: Design and Evaluation of an External Actuating Device for an Implanted Prosthetic Left Ventricle (1970)

Academic work
- Institutions: Worcester Polytechnic Institute

Robert L. Norton (May 5, 1939 – June 22, 2024) was an American engineer, academic and author. He was the President of Norton Associates and the Milton P. Higgins II Distinguished Professor Emeritus in Mechanical Engineering at the Worcester Polytechnic Institute.

Norton was most known for his machine design software and research in kinematics, machinery dynamics, cam design and manufacturing, computers in education and engineering education. He has authored and co-authored journal articles and 11 books including Design of Machinery, Machine Design: An Integrated Approach, Kinematics and Dynamics of Machinery, The Cam Design and Manufacturing Handbook, and Automotive Milestones: The Technological Development of the Automobile. He was named the 2007 U.S. Professor of the Year by the Council for the Advancement and Support of Education (CASE) and the Carnegie Foundation for the Advancement of Teaching, and was the recipient of several awards such as the 2002 American Society of Mechanical Engineers Machine Design Award, the 2004 Archie Higdon Distinguished Educator Award from the American Society for Engineering Education Mechanics Division, the 2009 Tufts University Outstanding Career Achievement Award, and an Honorary Doctor of Engineering degree from the WPI Board of Trustees in 2012.

Norton was an elected Fellow and Life Member of the American Society of Mechanical Engineers.

== Education ==
Norton graduated from Boston Technical High School in 1956, later earning an A.S. in Mechanical Engineering and a B.S. in Industrial Technology from Northeastern University. Subsequently, he obtained an M.S. in Engineering Design from Tufts University in 1970.

== Career ==
=== Early career ===
In 1967, after graduating from Northeastern University, he began teaching part-time at the university and took a full-time job with Jet Spray Cooler as a Project Engineer. Subsequently, he earned a master's degree from Tufts University in 1970, with a thesis on designing artificial hearts and assisted circulation devices, and worked at Tufts University School of Medicine and Medical Center as a Biomedical Engineer and Instructor from 1970 to 1975. In 1971, he founded Norton Associates Engineering for part-time industry consulting until 2019. He transitioned to the Tufts Engineering Design Department in 1975 as an assistant professor. In 1979, he returned to Polaroid Corp as a Senior Engineer in their Machine Design group.

=== Mid-career ===
In 1981, Norton left Polaroid and Northeastern University to teach at Worcester Polytechnic Institute (WPI) in Worcester, MA, becoming an associate professor in the Mechanical Engineering Department. He became a full professor in 1990, and initiated a research program in Machine Dynamics and Vibration. In 1982, he founded WPI's first microcomputer laboratory. He authored textbooks, including Design of Machinery (1991), Machine Design: An Integrated Approach (1996), and The Cam Design and Manufacturing Handbook (2002). Post-retirement, he wrote general interest books and memoirs such as Confessions of a Workaholic and The Evolution of Engineering in the 20th Century. Additional works include Cam Design: A Primer and A History of Point Connett in Mattapoisett, Massachusetts. He also developed computer programs, such as Linkages, Dynacam, and Matrix, distributed with his textbooks.

During the academic year 1996–97, Norton spent the first half working with The Gillette Company's Engineering and Implementation Group. The second half of the year he worked at Chrysler Corp's Technical Center, where he collaborated with the Small Engine Division on experimental work for the Neon engine's valve train. This work resulted in the publication of SAE technical papers. In 2003 to 2004, he worked at various Gillette engineering operations, providing design and analysis assistance. During this period, he also facilitated selected groups of WPI students to do their senior projects in Gillette's environment.

=== Late career ===
Norton established and managed the Gillette Project Center at WPI for 15 years until his retirement. Multiple teams of three to four students each spent a 7-week term at Gillette, where he supervised them daily. The projects were implemented, with Gillette adopting the students' equipment designs in the years following the projects.

Norton died on June 22, 2024, at the age 85.

== Research ==
Norton has contributed to the field of engineering by studying kinematics, dynamics of machinery, cam design and manufacturing, acoustics, computers in education, and engineering education, and writing several engineering design software packages.

=== Cam design ===
Norton's work on cam design focused on manufacturing and dynamics. In studies that received the Procter & Gamble Best Paper Award, he tested a number of eccentric and double-dwell cams with diverse manufacturing techniques on a Cam Dynamic Test Fixture, analyzing acceleration waveforms to identify significant differences between methods and revealing manufacturing techniques for achieving theoretical fidelity and quiet running, as well as emphasizing the interaction with the chosen acceleration design. He also applied the splinedyne method, a variation of the poly-dyne approach using B-spline functions and a dynamic follower train model, to enhance an automated assembly machine's cam-follower train, resulting in a 14% increase in production rate and a 1% reduction in scrap rate.

=== Machinery dynamics ===
Norton explored machinery design and dynamics in various areas. In a study with Mahdi Agheli and Stephen S. Nestinger, he introduced a general and comprehensive closed-form solution for the reachable workspace of a 2-RPR planar parallel mechanism, enabling accurate and reliable analysis, and facilitating efficient design and optimization based on the mechanism's workspace. In another collaborative research, he examined the nonlinear interaction between lateral vibration and rotation of an elastically mounted unbalanced shaft, focusing on phenomena like the Sommerfeld effect and transient motions, finding the possibility of non-stationary behavior.

=== Acoustics ===
Norton researched acoustics by looking into material responses to sounds. With Robert S. Bernstein, he conducted an experimental analysis of two commercial electrolarynx devices and introduced the Laboratory Prototype Electrolarynx (LAPEL), which produces a more natural and superior sound compared to existing electrolarynxes, addressing drawbacks such as harsh sound and background noise. In addition, he investigated sound propagation characteristics of materials, developing a methodology to compare metallic and non-metallic materials' acoustic responses under impact loading and applying the findings to redesign an impact stop for noise reduction in a manufacturing setting.

== Awards and honors ==
- 2002 – Machine Design Award, American Society of Mechanical Engineers
- 2004 – Archie Higdon Distinguished Educator Award, American Society for Engineering Education Mechanics Division
- 2007 – U.S. Professor of the Year, Council for the Advancement and Support of Education
- 2009 – Outstanding Career Achievement Award, Tufts University
- 2012 – Honorary Doctor of Engineering degree, WPI Board of Trustees

== Bibliography ==
=== Selected books ===
- Design of Machinery (1992) ISBN 9781260113310
- Machine Design: An Integrated Approach (1996) ISBN 9780135184233
- The Cam Design and Manufacturing Handbook (2002) ISBN 9780831131227
- Kinematics and Dynamics of Machinery (2008) ISBN 9780071278522
- Automotive Milestones: The Technological Development of the Automobile (2015) ISBN 9780831135201

=== Selected articles ===
- Birtwell, W. C., Giron, F., Ruiz, U., Norton, R. L., & Soroff, H. S. (1970). The regional hemodynamic response to synchronous external pressure assist. ASAIO Journal, 16(1), 462–465.
- Norton, R. L., Kataoka, K., Birtwell, W. C., & Soroff, H. S. (1971). Effects of change of ambient pressure differential on the effectiveness of peripheral external assist. ASAIO Journal, 17(1), 169–173.
- Zhang, C., Norton, P. R., & Hammonds, T. (1984). Optimization of parameters for specified path generation using an atlas of coupler curves of geared five-bar linkages. Mechanism and machine theory, 19(6), 459–466.
- Norton, R. L. (1988). Effect of manufacturing method on dynamic performance of cams—An experimental study. part I—eccentric cams. Mechanism and machine theory, 23(3), 191–199.
- Norton, R. L. (1988). Effect of manufacturing method on dynamic performance of cams. An experimental study. II: Double dwell cams. Mechanism and machine theory, 23(3), 201–208.
- Norton, R. L., & Bernstein, R. S. (1993). Improved LAboratory Prototype ELectrolarynx (LAPEL): using inverse filtering of the frequency response function of the human throat. Annals of biomedical engineering, 21, 163–174.
- Dimentberg, M. F., McGovern, L., Norton, R. L., Chapdelaine, J., & Harrison, R. (1997). Dynamics of an unbalanced shaft interacting with a limited power supply. Nonlinear Dynamics, 13, 171–187.
- Norton, R. L., Stene, R. L., Westbrook III, J., & Eovaldi, D. (1998). Analyzing Vibrations in an IC Engines Valve Train. SAE transactions, 856–863.
- Norton, R. L., Eovaldi, D., Westbrook, J., & Stene, R. L. (1999). Effect of valve-cam ramps on valve train dynamics (No. 1999–01–0801). SAE Technical Paper.
- Simionescu, P. A., & Norton, R. L. (2023). On the History of Early Automobile Suspension Systems. In IFToMM World Congress on Mechanism and Machine Science. Springer Nature Switzerland, 1012–1022.
