= Sedition (website) =

Online art distribution platform

Sedition is an online platform where artists distribute video art in digital format. The artworks are presented as digital limited editions that can be accessed via browsers or dedicated apps using smartphones, computers, tablets or TVs. Members can log in and purchase high-resolution digital stills and videos that are stored in the ‘Vault’. Sedition has apps for iPad, iPhone, Samsung Smart TVs and Allshare devices.

The art available on Sedition includes works from renowned contemporary artists such as Damien Hirst, Tracey Emin, Shepard Fairey, Yoko Ono, Jenny Holzer, Wim Wenders, Bill Viola, Aaron Koblin and many others. The platform aims to encourage people who might not be able to afford these artists’ traditional physical artworks to become collectors of digital editions.

Artworks are sold at affordable prices ranging from £5 to £1500. For many of the works, the price goes up as the edition sells out. The edition runs range from 30 to 10,000 editions. Each work comes with a digital certificate that is “signed, numbered and authenticated by the artist” Once an edition is sold out, collectors can resell their works in the online marketplace.

In June 2013, Sedition opened up its platform to allow submissions from other artists who can benefit from promoting and selling their works in digital limited editions. Sedition was launched in 2011 by Harry Blain, founder of Blain|Southern and Robert L. Norton, former CEO of Saatchi Online.
