= Burning Man =

Annual experimental event in Nevada, US

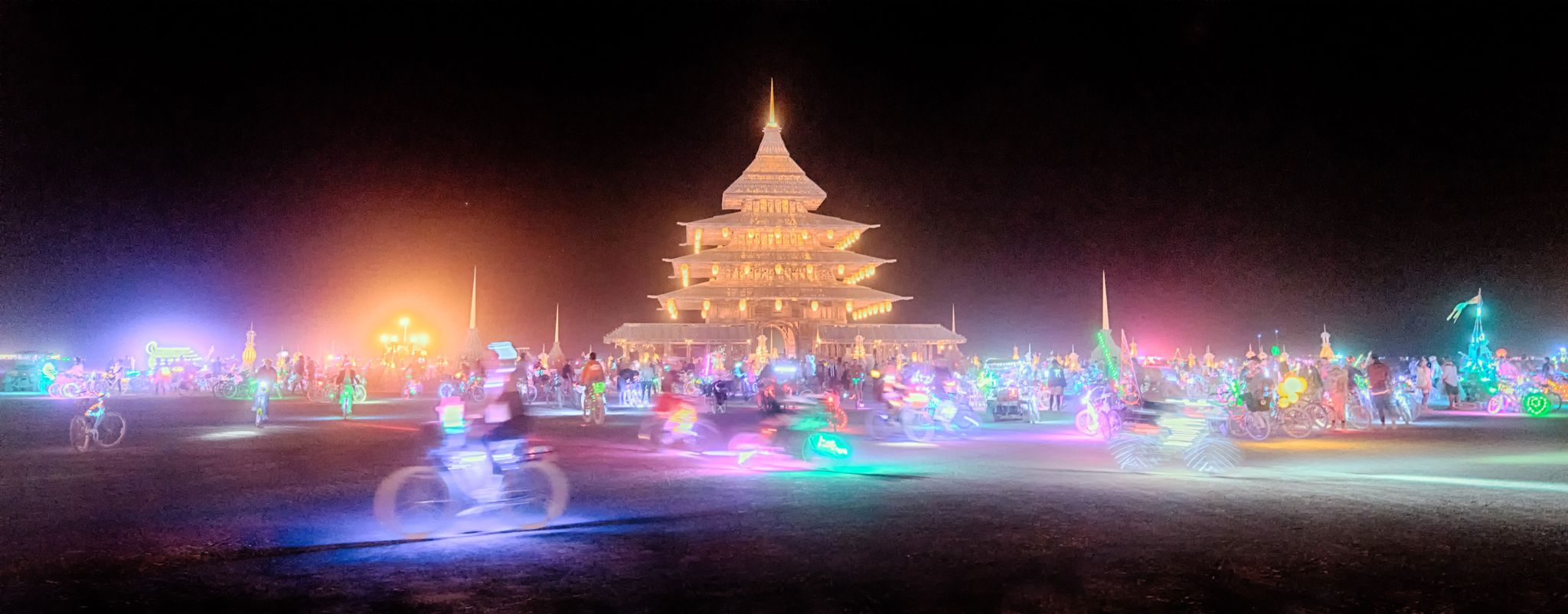
- The Temple, Burning Man 2016
- Begins: August 30, 2026
- Ends: September 7, 2026
- Venue: Black Rock City
- Locations: Black Rock Desert, Pershing County, Nevada, United States
- Coordinates: 40°47′13″N 119°12′15″W
- Years active: 40
- Inaugurated: June 22, 1986
- Founders: Cacophony Society; Larry Harvey; John Law; Jerry James
- Participants: 2019 (official): 78,850; 2021 (unofficial): 20,000
- Organiser: Burning Man Project
- Website: burningman.org

Burning Man is a week-long large-scale desert event focused on "community, art, self-expression, and self-reliance" held annually in the Western United States. The event's name comes from its ceremony on the second to last night of the event: the symbolic burning of a large wooden effigy, built every year for the event and referred to as the Man, the Saturday evening before Labor Day. Since 1990, the event has been at Black Rock City in northwestern Nevada, a temporary city erected in the Black Rock Desert about 100 miles (160 km) north-northeast of Reno. According to Burning Man co-founder Larry Harvey in 2004, the event is guided by ten stated principles: radical inclusion, gifting, decommodification, radical self-reliance, radical self-expression, communal effort, civic responsibility, leaving no trace, participation, and immediacy.

Burning Man features no headliners or scheduled performers; participants create all the art, activities, and events. Artwork includes experimental and interactive sculptures, buildings, performances, and art cars, among other media. These contributions are inspired by a theme chosen annually by the Burning Man Project. NPR said of Burning Man in 2019, "Once considered an underground gathering for bohemians and free spirits of all stripes, Burning Man has since evolved into a destination for social media influencers, celebrities and the Silicon Valley elite."

Location in Nevada

Burning Man originated on June 22, 1986, on Baker Beach in San Francisco as a small function organized by Larry Harvey and Jerry James, the builders of the first Man. It has since been held annually, spanning the nine days leading up to and including Labor Day. Over the event's history, attendance has generally increased. In 2019, 78,850 people participated.

Burning Man is organized by the Burning Man Project, a nonprofit organization that, in 2013, succeeded Black Rock City LLC, a for-profit limited liability company. Black Rock City LLC was formed in 1999 to represent the event's organizers and is now considered a subsidiary of the nonprofit organization. The Burning Man Project endorses multiple smaller regional events guided by the Burning Man principles in the United States and internationally. The 1979 film Stalker by Andrei Tarkovsky heavily influenced the Cacophony Society, which began in 1986 in the San Francisco Bay Area and which organized "Zone Trips" for participants. The first burning of a wooden, symbolic man at Black Rock Desert, Nevada, occurred on "Zone Trip Number 4" in 1990, laying the foundation for what would become the modern Burning Man.

== History ==
=== 1980s ===
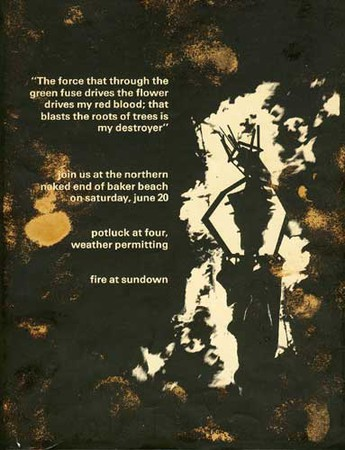
Poster for Burning Man 1987, showing the 1986 effigy

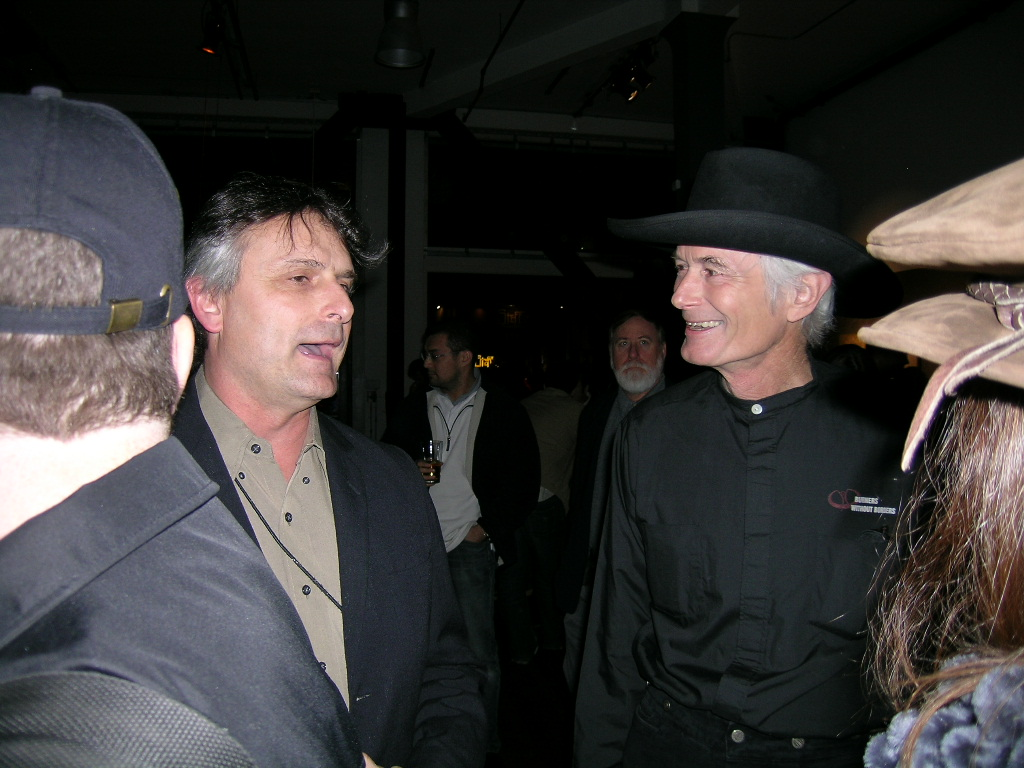
Two of the founders of Burning Man: John Law (left) and Michael Mikel (right)

Burning Man began as a bonfire ritual on the summer solstice. Sculptor Mary Grauberger, a friend of Larry Harvey's girlfriend, Janet Lohr, held solstice bonfire gatherings on Baker Beach for several years before 1986, some of which Harvey attended. When Grauberger stopped organizing it, Harvey "picked up the torch", with Grauberger's permission, and ran with it. He and Jerry James built the first wooden effigy on June 21, 1986, cobbled together using scrap wood, to be torched that evening. On June 22, Harvey, James, and a few friends met on Baker Beach in San Francisco and burned an 8-foot-tall (2.4 m) wooden man and a smaller wooden dog. Harvey later described his inspiration for burning these effigies as a spontaneous act of "radical self-expression". In 1987, the Man grew to 15 feet (5 m) tall, and by 1988, it had grown to 30 feet (9 m).

By 1988, Harvey formally named the summer solstice ritual "Burning Man" by titling flyers for the happening as such. This was done to ward off references to "wicker man", the reputed Celtic pagan practice of burning live sacrifices in human-shaped wicker cages. Harvey has said that he had not seen the 1973 cult film The Wicker Man until many years after and that it did not inspire the action.

=== 1990 to 1996 ===
8mm film footage of Burning Man in 1995 by Ammon Haggerty

Also in 1986, Kevin Evans and John Law began a series of events inspired by the Soviet film, Stalker called Zone Trips. In 1990, the fourth event of this series was planned for the remote and largely unknown playa, also known as the Black Rock Desert, about 110 miles (180 km) north of Reno, Nevada. Evans conceived it as a dadaist temporary autonomous zone with sculptures to be burned and situationist performance art. He asked John Law, who also had experience on the dry lake and was a defining founder of the Cacophony Society, to take on central organizing functions of the events. In the Cacophony Society's newsletter, it was announced as Zone Trip No. 4, A Bad Day at Black Rock (inspired by the 1955 film of the same name).

Park police, arguing that the organizers did not have a permit, objected to the solstice burn at Baker Beach. After striking a deal to raise the Man but not to burn it, event organizers disassembled it and returned it to the vacant lot where it had been built. Shortly thereafter, the legs and torso of the Man were chain-sawed, and the pieces were removed when the space was unexpectedly leased as a parking lot. The Man was reconstructed, led by Dan Miller, Harvey's then-housemate of many years, just in time to take it to Zone Trip No. 4.

Michael Mikel, another active Cacophonist, realized that participants unfamiliar with the environment of the dry lake would benefit from knowledgeable persons helping to ensure they did not get lost in the deep dry lake and risk dehydration and death. He took the name Danger Ranger and created the Black Rock Rangers to assist them. Thus, Black Rock City began as a fellowship organized by Law and Mikel, based on Evans's and Grauberger's ideas and Harvey's and James's symbolic man. Drawing on experience in the sign business and with light sculpture, Law prepared custom neon tubes for the Man starting in 1991 so it could be seen as a beacon to aid navigation at night long before there were any planned roads.

In its early years, the community grew by word of mouth alone, and all were considered (and generally not invited until they could be expected to be) participants in their contribution to the cacophonous situationist vibe. There were no paid or scheduled performers or artists, no separation between art and life nor art space and living space, no rules other than "Don't interfere with anyone else's immediate experience" and "no guns in central camp".

1991 marked the first year that the event had a legal permit through the BLM (the Bureau of Land Management). It was also the year that art model and fire dancer (and later Burning Man's first art director) Crimson Rose attended the event. 1992 saw the birth of a smaller, intensive, nearby event named "Desert Siteworks", conceived and directed by William Binzen and co-produced (in 1993 and '94) with Judy West. There were about 20 participants the first year, and approximately 100 in the second and third year. The annual, several weeks-long event, was held over summer Solstice at various fertile hot springs surrounding the desert. Participants built art and participated in self-directed performances.

Some key organizers of Burning Man were also part of Desert Siteworks (Law, Mikel) and Binzen was a friend of Harvey. Hence, the two events saw much cross-pollination of ideas and participants. The Desert Siteworks project ran for three years (1992–1994). 1996 was the first year a formal partnership was created to own the name "Burning Man" and was also the last year the event was held in the middle of the Black Rock Desert with no fence around it.

Before the event opened to the public in 1996, a worker named Michael Furey was killed in a motorcycle crash while riding from Gerlach, Nevada, to the Burning Man camp in the Black Rock Desert. Harvey insisted that the death had not occurred at Burning Man, since the gates were not yet open. Another couple were run over in their tent by an art car driving to the "rave camp", which was at that time distant from the main camp. After the 1996 event, Law broke with Burning Man and publicly said the event should not continue.

=== 1997 to 2013 ===
The neon-tubed Man at the 1999 event

1997 marked another major pivotal year for the event. It had to be moved because the permit for Black Rock was denied for the 1997 event. A team conducting land speed trials had a conflicting permit that took precedence. Fly Ranch, with the smaller adjoining Hualapai dry lakebed, just west of the Black Rock desert, was chosen as the alternate location. This moved Burning Man from Pershing County/federal BLM land into the jurisdiction of Washoe County, which brought a protracted list of permit requirements.

In 1999 to comply with the new requirements and manage the increased liability load, Harvey and five organizers formed Black Rock City LLC with the assistance of "Biz Babe" Dana Harrison. The LLC founders consisted of Larry Harvey (chief philosophy officer), Harley K. DuBois (chief transition officer), Marian Goodell (CEO), Crimson Rose (art transition officer), Will Roger Peterson (Nevada relations director), and Michael Mikel (historian and archivist).

Will Roger Peterson and Flynn Mauthe created the Black Rock City Department of Public Works (DPW) to build the "city" grid layout (a requirement so that emergency vehicles could be directed to an "address"), designed by Rod Garrett, an architect. Garrett continued as the city designer until his death in 2011, at age 76. He is also credited with the design of all of the Man bases from 2001 through 2012, the center camp café and first camp. 1998 saw a return to the Black Rock desert, although not to the deep playa, along with a temporary perimeter fence. The event has remained there since.

As the population of Black Rock City grew, the BLM added more restrictions, and changes were made in how people were invited to the event, notably the addition of publicized online ticket sales to all comers; further rules were established concerning its survival. Some critics of the later phase of the event cite these rules as impinging on the original freedoms and principles, diminishing the scope of the experience unacceptably, while many newer attendees find the increased level of activity more than balances out the changes:

- A grid street structure.
- A speed limit of 5 mph (8 km/h).
- A ban on driving, except for approved "mutant vehicles" and service vehicles.
- Safety standards on mutant vehicles.
- Burning of any art must be done on an approved burn platform.
- A ban on fireworks.
- A ban on animals.

Another notable restriction to attendees is the 9.2-mile- (14.8 km) long temporary plastic fence that surrounds the event and defines the pentagon of land used by the event on the southern edge of the Black Rock dry lake. This 4-foot- (1.2-meter) high barrier is known as the "trash fence" because its initial use was to catch wind-blown debris that might escape from campsites during the event. Since 2002, the area beyond this fence has not been accessible to Burning Man participants during the event.

One visitor who was accidentally burned at the 2005 event unsuccessfully sued Black Rock City LLC in San Francisco County Superior Court. On June 30, 2009, the California Court of Appeal for the First District upheld the trial court's grant of summary judgment to Black Rock City LLC on the basis that people who deliberately walk toward The Man after it is ignited assume the risk of getting burned by such a hazardous object.

=== 2013 to 2019 ===
In December 2013, following negotiations between founders, Black Rock City LLC was made a subsidiary of a new nonprofit entity known as the Burning Man Project.

On September 3, 2017, a 41-year-old man, Aaron Joel Mitchell, fought his way past a safety cordon of volunteers and firefighters and threw himself into the flames of the Man. Mitchell died the next day due to cardiac arrest, bodily shock, and third-degree burns to 97% of his body. His death was ruled a suicide.

=== 2020 to 2021 ===
On April 10, 2020, the Burning Man Project announced that Burning Man was canceled for 2020 due to the COVID-19 pandemic, making 2020 the first year Burning Man did not happen since its inception. They then decided to offer ticket refunds despite the tickets being sold explicitly as non-refundable.

On September 7, 2020, an estimated 1,000 Burners celebrated on San Francisco's Ocean Beach. San Francisco Mayor London Breed tweeted about the event, "This was reckless and selfish. You aren't celebrating, but are putting people's lives and our progress at risk. No one is immune from spreading the virus." Several thousand also showed up in the Black Rock desert for an unofficial event and some described it as a return to the "old days".

The 2021 event was canceled on April 27, 2021, due to the continuation of the COVID-19 pandemic. Despite progress on vaccination, organizers said that "uncertainties that need to be resolved are impossible to resolve in the time we have". On May 14, 2021, the Burning Man Project released tickets on their website for online events slated between August 22 and September 7, 2021.

The unofficial event was more extensive than in 2020, with an estimated 20,000 attending. Various groups loosely coordinated it, including Black Rock Plan B and Rogue Burn. The Bureau of Land Management implemented restrictions including no structures other than shade structures and no fires other than campfires. There was a massive illuminated drone display outlining the Man instead of the burning of a Man effigy.

=== 2023 ===
The 2023 Burning Man had rains and subsequent flooding on Labor Day weekend, with a lockdown preventing vehicle movement throughout the site. Organizers arranged for some cellular service and shared a 2023 Wet Playa Survival Guide: "no driving is permitted until the playa surface dries up, with the exception of emergency services… Participants are encouraged to conserve food, water, and fuel, and shelter in a warm, safe space" and told attendees about Burning Man Information Radio (BMIR) 94.5 FM and Gate Information Radio Station (GARS) 95.1. One person died following the flooding, with thousands more stranded.

=== 2024 ===
On August 25, 2024, the first day of the 2024 Burning Man event, a female participant died. On August 26, it was reported that tickets remained unsold for the event for the first time since 2011. As ticket sales lagged, the organizers asked large-scale sound camps' DJs to drive ticket sales by announcing their lineups early. This conflicted with the event's principle of decommodification. Some camps declined the request or responded satirically; the art car Robot Heart released its lineup as a game of hangman.

An epic dust storm was reported on the final day of the event, snarling departure traffic and causing lines to last more than four hours.

The Burning Man Project engaged in a fundraising campaign that began in October 2024. The campaign aims to collect $20 million. In December 2024, CEO Marian Goodell emailed supporters that the project still requires $14 million to meet its financial goal for the 2025 event.

=== 2025 ===
The 2025 Burning Man event opened on August 24, 2025, and ran until September 1, 2025. However, shortly before the opening, it was reported that the event once again failed to have a sell-out attendance and that ongoing financial problems persisted. Business Insider stated that the annual event was now in a "precarious financial situation." At the time the event began, massive dust storms occurred. On August 27, 2025, it was revealed that the event's "Orgy Dome," which had been in use at the event since 2003, had collapsed due to strong desert winds. It was afterwards announced that it would not be restored for the year. Gates also closed intermittently because of heavy rain, with one participant being electrocuted. On August 30, a man was found dead at the event. The victim was later identified as 37-year-old Vadim Kruglov, a Washington resident originally from Russia. Police are treating it as a homicide.

=== 2026 ===
The 2026 Burning Man festival ran from August 30 through September 7. Three attendees died during the event; two on the festival grounds, and one in transit to a local hospital.

== Event timeline ==
The statistics below illustrate the growth in both the scale and scope of Burning Man in terms of location, height of the central Man sculpture, population, ticket price, and several registered camps and art.

After starting at 8 ft (2.4 m) and growing taller each of the next three years, the height of the titular Man remained at 40 ft (12 m) between 1989 and 2013. During those years, changes in the size and form of the base on which the wooden Man stood accounted for the differing heights of the overall structures. In 2014 the construction of the Man changed to a 105 ft (32 m) tall figure standing directly on the ground with no base. From 2015 to 2019 the Man returned to 40 ft (12 m) in height.

| Year | Location | Theme | Man height | Population | Bureau of Land Management population limit | Ticket price(s) | Weather Overview | Theme camps | Mutant vehicles | Placed art |
|---|---|---|---|---|---|---|---|---|---|---|
| 1986 | Baker Beach | None | 8 ft (2.4 m) | 35 | Not on BLM land | Free | | None | None | None |
| 1986 | Larry Harvey and Jerry James burn a wooden effigy of a man at Baker Beach on the summer solstice, following a tradition begun by Mary Grauberger of burning art at Baker Beach on the summer solstice. | | | | | | | | | |
| 1987 | Baker Beach | None | 15 ft (4.6 m) | 80 | Not on BLM land | Free | | None | None | None |
| 1987 | Whereas the previous year's effigy was assembled from scrap wood on the morning of the solstice, the 1987 Man was built over several weeks from cut lumber. | | | | | | | | | |
| 1988 | Baker Beach | None | 30 ft (9.1 m) | 200 | Not on BLM land | Free | | None | None | None |
| 1988 | Larry Harvey first names the annual event "Burning Man." | | | | | | | | | |
| 1989 | Baker Beach | None | 40 ft (12 m) | 300 | Not on BLM land | Free | | None | None | None |
| 1989 | First listing of Burning Man in the San Francisco Cacophony Society newsletter, "Rough Draft" under "sounds like cacophony". | | | | | | | | | |
| 1990 | Baker Beach & Black Rock Desert | None | 40 ft (12 m) | 500 at Baker Beach; 120 at Black Rock Desert | None | $15 (requested donation) | | None | None | None |
| 1990 | The Man was erected at Baker Beach on the summer solstice but not burned. The Man was then "invited" to the San Francisco Cacophony Zone Trip No. 4 on Labor Day weekend in the Black Rock Desert. | | | | | | | | | |
| 1991 | Black Rock Desert | None | 40 ft (12 m) | 250 | None | $15 (requested donation) | | None | None | None |
| 1991 | The Man was decorated with neon lighting in 1991 for the first time, and it has been decorated with neon every year since. | | | | | | | | | |
| 1992 | Black Rock Desert | None | 40 ft (12 m) | 600 | None | $25 (requested donation) | | 0 | | 2 |
| 1992 | First year amplified music appeared at Burning Man. Craig Ellenwood and TerboTed set up a camp, approved by Larry Harvey one mile from center camp and launched the first EDM camp. | | | | | | | | | |
| 1993 | Black Rock Desert | None | 40 ft (12 m) | 1,000 | None | $40 | | 1 | | 3 |
| 1993 | "Christmas Camp" becomes the first theme camp, with its two members dressing up as Santa Claus and giving out fruitcake and eggnog. | | | | | | | | | |
| 1994 | Black Rock Desert | None | 40 ft (12 m) | 2,000 | None | $30 | | | | 5 |
| 1994 | First year of wooden spires and lamp lighting. | | | | | | | | | |
| 1995 | Black Rock Desert | None | 40 ft (12 m) | 4,000 | None | $35 | | | | 6 |
| 1995 | The Center Camp Cafe began selling coffee. | | | | | | | | | |
| 1996 | Black Rock Desert | heLLCo | 48 ft (15 m) | 8,000 | None | $35 | | | | 11 |
| 1996 | Theme was a satire referencing Dante's Inferno, heLLCo (a corporate takeover of Hell). First year the Man is elevated on a straw bale pyramid. First fatality in motorcycle collision. Three people seriously injured in a tent run over by a car. 10 of 16 BLM stipulations violated, putting BM on probationary status for next year. An injury claim drives liability coverage up by a factor of 6. Featured in an article in Wired magazine. | | | | | | | | | |
| 1997 | Hualapai Playa | Fertility | 50 ft (15 m) | 10,000 | Not on BLM land | Advance sale: $65; At gate: $75; Day visit: $20 | | 51 | | 21 |
| 1997 | Burning Man's founders form a management structure, and created the DPW to meet strict permit requirements newly imposed. The first year the city has grid streets and a driving ban. Washoe County officials impounded gate receipts to ensure payment after the fire and protection fees along with more than 100 new fire and safety conditions are imposed before the event. | | | | | | | | | |
| 1998 | Black Rock Desert | Nebulous Entity | 52 ft (16 m) | 15,000 | None | Early sale: $65; Advance sale: $80; At gate: $100 | | 348 | | 20 |
| 1998 | Burning Man returned to the Black Rock Desert although much closer to Gerlach than before. The "Nebulous Entity" was Harvey's satirical concept of alien beings who thrive on information – who consume it but do not understand it. The First Doodle from Google to Celebrate. | | | | | | | | | |
| 1999 | Black Rock Desert | Wheel of Time | 54 ft (16 m) | 23,000 | None | Until April 15: $65; Until July 31: $80; Until August 29: $100; August 30: $105; August 31: $110; September 1: $115; September 2: $120 | | 320 | | 30 |
| 1999 | Listed in the AAA's RV guide under "Great Destinations." | | | | | | | | | |
| 2000 | Black Rock Desert | The Body | 54 ft (16 m) | 25,400 | None | Until April 30: $145; Until June 30: $165; Until July 31: $185; Until August 27: $200; August 28/29: $220; August 30/31: $250 | | 460 | | 80 |
| 2000 | First active law enforcement activity, 60 Bureau of Land Management (BLM) and police arrests and citations. Most are for minor drug charges following surveillance and searches. | | | | | | | | | |
| 2001 | Black Rock Desert | Seven Ages | 70 ft (21 m) | 25,659 | None | Early sale: $145; Next 4,000 tickets: $165; Next 4,000 tickets: $185; Remaining advance sale: $200; At gate: $250 | | 466 | | 150 |
| 2001 | See Seven Ages of Man. Over 100 BLM citations and 5 arrests. | | | | | | | | | |
| 2002 | Black Rock Desert | The Floating World | 80 ft (24 m) | 28,979 | None | Early sale: $145; Next 4,000 tickets: $165; Next 4,000 tickets: $175; Next 4,000 tickets: $185; Remaining advance sale: $200; At gate: $250 | | 487 | | 120 |
| 2002 | First year for FAA approved airport. 135 BLM citations and 4 Sheriff citations. | | | | | | | | | |
| 2003 | Black Rock Desert | Beyond Belief | 79 ft (24 m) | 30,586 | None | Early sale: $145; Next 2,500 tickets: $165; Next 2,500 tickets: $175; Next 2,500 tickets: $185; Next 2,500 tickets: $200; Remaining advance sale: $225; At gate: $250 | | 504 | | 261 |
| 2003 | Dogs are banned for the first time. 177 BLM citations, 9 police citations, 10 arrests and 1 fatality. | | | | | | | | | |
| 2004 | Black Rock Desert | The Vault of Heaven | 80 ft (24 m) | 35,664 | None | Low income tickets: $145; First 6,000 tickets: $165; Next 6,000 tickets: $185; Next 7,000 tickets: $200; Next 7,000 tickets: $225; Remaining advance sale and at gate: $250 | | 503 | | 220 |
| 2004 | 218 BLM citations, some issued from decoy 'art car'. Camps giving away alcohol subject to state law compliance examinations and 1 arrest. Pershing County Sheriff's office: 27 cases, 4 arrests, 2 citations. Nevada Highway Patrol: 2 DUI arrests, 217 citations, and 246 warnings were issued. | | | | | | | | | |
| 2005 | Black Rock Desert | Psyche | 72 ft (22 m) | 35,567 | None | Low income tickets: $145; First 10,000 tickets: $175; Next 5,000 tickets: $200; Next 5,000 tickets: $225; Remaining advance sale and at gate: $250 | | 485 | | 275 |
| 2005 | The Man, perched atop a "funhouse" maze, could be turned by participants, confusing those at a distance who use it to navigate. Dream related artwork. 218 BLM citations, 6 arrests and 1 fatality. | | | | | | | | | |
| 2006 | Black Rock Desert | Hope and Fear | 72 ft (22 m) | 38,989 | 6%> previous highest; (37,803) | Low income tickets: $145; First 7,000 tickets: $185; Next 7,000 tickets: $200; Next 6,000 tickets: $225; Remaining advance sale until August 13: $250; After August 13 and at gate: $280 | | 570 | | 300 |
| 2006 | The Man goes up and down reflecting a hope/fear meter. Voting stations were set up around the playa, allowing residents to cast a Hopeful or Fearful vote for the future of Man. If the vote was hopeful he would burn with his hands in the air, otherwise with hands down. They voted hopeful, and his arms were raised until the end. 155 BLM citations and 1 arrest. Pershing County Sheriff's office: 1 citation and 7 arrests. Nevada Highway Patrol: 234 citations, 17 arrests, and 213 warnings. | | | | | | | | | |
| 2007 | Black Rock Desert | The Green Man | 72 ft (22 m) | 47,097 | 6%> previous highest; (41,328) | Low income tickets: $145; First 10,000 tickets: $195; Next 10,000 tickets: $225; Next 10,000 tickets: $250; Remaining advance sale & At gate: $280 | | 681 | | 300 |
| 2007 | The Man was prematurely set on fire around 2:58 am, Tuesday, August 28, during a full lunar eclipse. A repeat Burning Man prankster, Paul Addis, was arrested and charged with arson, and the Man was rebuilt for regular Saturday burn. Addis pleaded guilty in May 2008 to one felony count of injury to property, was sentenced to up to four years in Nevada state prison, and was ordered to pay $30,000 in restitution. 331 BLM citations. | | | | | | | | | |
| 2008 | Black Rock Desert | American Dream | 90 ft (27 m) | 49,599 | 6%> previous highest; (50,207) | Low income tickets: $145; First 10,000 tickets: $210; Next 10,000 tickets: $225; Next 10,000 tickets: $250; Remaining advance sale: $295 | | 746 | | 285 |
| 2008 | First year that tickets are not sold at the gate. The size and layout of the city is enlarged to accommodate a larger central playa and a longer Esplanade. Because of excessively high winds and whiteout conditions on Saturday, the burning of the Man was delayed for over an hour and a half and the fire conclave was canceled. Many longtime contributors opted out allegedly due to the chosen theme ("The American Dream"), the jailing of dissenter Addis, and the founders' rift. The perimeter of BRC extended to 9 miles. The BLM made 6 arrests and issued 129 citations. | | | | | | | | | |
| 2009 | Black Rock Desert | Evolution | 75 ft (23 m) | 43,558 | 6%> previous highest; (52,575) | Low income tickets: $160; Pre-sale tickets: $260; Next 9,000 tickets: $210; Next 9,000 tickets: $240; Next 9,000 tickets: $260; Next 9,000 tickets: $280; Remaining advance sale: $300 | | 618 | | 215 |
| 2009 | As the result of some criticism, the size and layout of the city were returned to roughly the same as the 2007 event. The BLM officials said that as of noon Saturday, 41,059 people were at Burning Man, and the crowd peaked at 43,435 at noon Friday, a noted decline after years of steady attendance growth, due mainly to the 2008 financial crisis. BLM issued 287 citations and 9 arrests. | | | | | | | | | |
| 2010 | Black Rock Desert | Metropolis | 104 ft (32 m) | 51,525 | 6%> previous highest; (52,575) | Low income tickets: $160; Pre-sale tickets: $280; Next 9,000 tickets: $210; Next 9,000 tickets: $240; Next 9,000 tickets: $260; Next 9,000 tickets: $280; Remaining advance sale: $300 | | 700 | | 275 |
| 2010 | Attendance over 50,000 mark, for the first time. The gate opened early, at 6 pm Sunday, for the first time. Coincided with the inaugural Black Rock City Film Festival. BLM issued 293 citations and 8 arrests. | | | | | | | | | |
| 2011 | Black Rock Desert | Rites of Passage | 90 ft (27 m) | 53,963 | 50,000 | Low income tickets: $160; Pre-sale tickets: $360; Next 9,000 tickets: $210; Next 9,000 tickets: $240; Next 9,000 tickets: $280; Remaining advance sale: $320 | | 920 | | 309 |
| 2011 | According to Black Rock LLC, 27,000 tickets (all discounted tiers) were sold by midday the day following the opening of ticket sales. For the first time in Burning Man history, tickets sold out before the event on July 24, 2011. | | | | | | | | | |
| 2012 | Black Rock Desert | Fertility 2.0 | 93 ft (28 m) | 56,149 | 60,900 | Low income tickets: $160; Pre-sale tickets: $420; Lottery 1st draw: $240; Lottery 2nd draw: $320; Lottery 3rd draw and Directed Group Sales (DGS): $390 | | 978 | | 360 |
| 2012 | Due to the sellout of the event in 2011, Burning Man Project opted for a complex multi-round, random selection system of ticket sales with a separate low-income program. On January 27, Burning Man Project announced that the number of tickets requested in the Main Sale was around 120,000 vis-à-vis the 40,000 that were available. In consequence, a significant number of registrants would not be awarded tickets in the Main Sale. The Main Sale was originally planned to be followed by a secondary open sale of 10,000 tickets. However, as the huge demand from the Main Sale left many veteran burners and theme camps without tickets, Burning Man Project opted for a "directed ticket distribution" (DGS) instead, i.e., "manually redirect them to some of the vital groups and collaborations that make up Black Rock City" rather than an open sale. | | | | | | | | | |
| 2013 | Black Rock Desert | Cargo Cult | 85 ft (26 m) | 69,613 | 68,000 | Low income tickets: $190; Pre-sale tickets: $650; DGS, Individual Sale, and OMG Sale: $380 | | 1056 | | 382 |
| 2013 | The year's theme was based on John Frum and Cargo Cults. Ticket tiers were eliminated and a flat rate price structure was adopted (except for low-income ticket program). | | | | | | | | | |
| 2014 | Black Rock Desert | Caravansary | 105 ft (32 m) | 65,922 | 68,000 | Low income tickets: $190; Pre-sale tickets: $650; DGS, Individual Sale, and OMG Sale: $380; Vehicle passes: $40 | | | | 350 |
| 2014 | This year, the Burning Man Traffic Mitigation Plan went into effect. All vehicles entering Black Rock City needed a $40 vehicle pass. Only 35,000 passes were available. A woman is killed in a vehicle collision. The entrance to the event was closed on August 25 due to rain, with attendees forced to stay temporarily in nearby parts of Nevada. | | | | | | | | | |
| 2015 | Black Rock Desert | Carnival of Mirrors | 69 ft (21 m) | 67,564 | 70,000 | Low income tickets: $190; Pre-sale tickets: $800; DGS, Individual Sale, and OMG Sale: $390; Vehicle passes: $50 | Night temperatures plummeted to the 20s. Winds were over 45 mph (72 km/h) and sustained for long periods of time. | | | 326 |
| 2015 | First time in nearly 10 years that the Man base is on the ground (as opposed to a raised base). Only 27,000 vehicle passes were made available this year. | | | | | | | | | |
| 2016 | Black Rock Desert | Da Vinci's Workshop | 70 ft (21 m) | 67,290 | 70,000 | Low income tickets: $190; Pre-sale tickets: $990; Pre-sale "Art Tickets": $1200; DGS, Individual Sale, and OMG Sale: $390; Vehicle passes: $80 | | | | 316 |
| 2016 | Tying in with the 2016 theme – the works of Leonardo da Vinci, the Man was a large-scale interpretation of the Vitruvian Man on a circular frame; contained within its base was a wheel and gear system that was to allow groups of visitors to manually rotate the Man. The gear system was damaged during setup, however, and was not functional during the event. | | | | | | | | | |
| 2017 | Black Rock Desert | Radical Ritual | 105 ft (32 m) | 69,493 | 70,000 | Low income tickets: $190; Pre-sale tickets: $990; Pre-sale "Art Tickets": $1200; DGS, Main Sale, and OMG Sale: $425; Vehicle passes: $80 | | 1395 | | 317 |
| 2017 | A 41-year-old man, Aaron Joel Mitchell, died after running through the security cordon into the already ignited Man. | | | | | | | | | |
| 2018 | Black Rock Desert | I, Robot | 85 ft (26 m) | 70,248 | 70,000 | Low income tickets: $190; Pre-sale tickets: $990; Pre-sale "Art Tickets": $1200; DGS, Main Sale, and OMG Sale: $425; Vehicle passes: $80 | | 1472 | 618 | 383 |
| 2018 | Due to ticket overselling, the population of Black Rock City exceeded the 70,000 participant limit, and on Thursday of event week the BLM requested that the gate be closed. New participants were only let in once another had left. | | | | | | | | | |
| 2019 | Black Rock Desert | Metamorphoses | 61 ft (19 m) | 78,850 | 80,000 | Low income tickets: $190; FOMO Sale: $1400; DGS & Main Sale: $425; OMG Sale: $550; Vehicle passes: $100 | | 1545 | 632 | 415 |
| 2019 | The BLM's definition of "population" was changed to include BRC staff and volunteers in addition to paid participants. The maximum population limit was increased by 10,000 to accommodate, accordingly. | | | | | | | | | |
| 2020 | Black Rock Desert | The Multiverse | N/A | 5,000 | N/A | N/A | | | | |
| 2020 | Burning Man was canceled in 2020 due to the global COVID-19 pandemic. On July 2, 2020, the eight virtual Universes were announced as The Infinite Playa, Multiverse, SparkleVerse, MysticVerse, BRCvr, BURN2, Build-A-Burn, and The Bridge Experience. Approximately 5,000 people showed up in the Black Rock desert for a ticketless, unofficial burn. | | | | | | | | | |
| 2021 | Black Rock Desert | The Great Unknown | drone display | 20,000 | N/A | N/A | | 500+ | | None |
| 2021 | The theme was originally announced as "Terra Incognita" then later changed to "The Great Unknown". The event was canceled for the second year due to the global COVID-19 pandemic. An estimated 20,000 showed up for a loosely organized "rogue" burn. | | | | | | | | | |
| 2022 | Black Rock Desert | Waking Dreams | 64 ft (20 m) | 75,069 | 87,000 | Ticket Aid Program: $225; FOMO Sale: $2500 or $1500; Stewards Sale (formerly DGS): $475; Main Sale and OMG Sale: $575; Vehicle passes: $140 | Highs during Burn week were between 98 and 103 °F. | | | |
| 2022 | On December 15, 2021, the Burning Man Project announced that the 2022 event would take place in person. | | | | | | | | | |
| 2023 | Black Rock Desert | Animalia | 75 ft (23 m) | 74,126 | 87,000 | Ticket Aid Program: $225; FOMO Sale: $2750 or $1500; Stewards Sale: $575; Main Sale and OMG Sale: $575; Vehicle passes: $150 | About 0.8" of rain fell on Thursday of Burn week. | | | |
| 2023 | The event experienced inclement weather and flooding for the first time, forcing the gates and the roads leading to Black Rock City to be closed for a period of time. A death was also reported. | | | | | | | | | |
| 2024 | Black Rock Desert | Curiouser & Curiouser | 67 ft (20 m) | 69,141 | 87,000 | Ticket Aid Program: $225; FOMO Sale: $2500 or $1500; Stewards Sale: $575; Main Sale and OMG Sale: $575; Vehicle passes: $150 | Mild rain and sustained high winds during build week. Burn week had highs between 80s and mid 90s, Lows in the 40s and high 50s. Max winds were 5 mph (8 km/h) until Monday after the Burns concluded and it peaked at 45 mph (72 km/h). | | | |
| 2024 | For the first time in many years, tickets were available without registration through the OMG sale weeks before the event. One death was reported on the opening day. The 2024 event marks first time since 2011 that tickets weren't sold out. | | | | | | | | | |
| 2025 | Black Rock Desert | Tomorrow Today | 68 ft (21 m) | 72,181 | 87,000 | | | | | |
| 2026 | Black Rock Desert | Axis Mundi | | | 87,000 | Ticket Aid Program: $250; Tiered sales: $550, $675, $775, $975, $1500, or $3000; Vehicle passes: $165 | | | | |

=== Population counts ===
The population count is a stipulation of the Special Recreation Permit (SRP) granted to the Burning Man Project, formerly Black Rock City, LLC (BRC), by the BLM, for the event each year. Originally used to calculate fees, it is now used to ensure that the event does not exceed the maximum authorized population as specified in the SRP. Not everyone at the event is included in the population count. Exempted from the count are government personnel and government contractors; however, this has changed over time.

The population count was originally used to calculate fees owed to the BLM. It was not long until the BLM began considering putting a limit on the number of people that would be allowed to attend the event. This became a point of contention as early as 1998 when the BLM proposed a complicated usage formula, effectively limiting the size of the event to that of the previous year.

Starting in 2006, the SRP stipulated that BRC manage "ticket sales in a manner to keep the maximum population of the event from increasing more than 6% above the highest population recorded in a previous year." Fees were based on the daily population counts of Black Rock City at noon. This was the first year where fees were explicitly exempted for BRC staff..

In 2011, the fee structure changed to be based on adjusted gross income and was no longer tied to daily population counts.

The 2012 SRP further defined who was to be counted in population counts. The term "participant" was introduced, as defined in that year's Environmental Assessment (EA), to include "all attendees of the event, including paid participants and volunteers. The population does not include government personnel, Humboldt General Hospital emergency service providers, vendors and contractors." The maximum authorized population now applied to "participants".

In 2014, volunteers were explicitly exempted from the population count and the population cap was further refined to now apply to "paid participants".

In 2019, the definition of "population" changed again, this time to include BRC staff and volunteers, now collectively referred to as "attendees". This coincided with the necessity of a new Environmental Impact Statement (EIS) for the 2019–2028 SRP application which introduced this change in definition. The Burning Man Project reported a population of 78,850 for that year, an increase of about 8,600 people from the previous year, noting that "everyone" was now being counted in the maximum population count. This roughly correlates with the Burning Man Project's 2019 Form 990 disclosure which states it employs 986 people and has 10,000 volunteers.

In 2022, an additional restriction on the total number of attendees for the entirety of the event was introduced. "The cumulative maximum authorized population for the 2022 event is 87,000 total attendees." The maximum number of attendees on the playa at any one time remained as it was in 2019 at 80,000.

== Principles ==
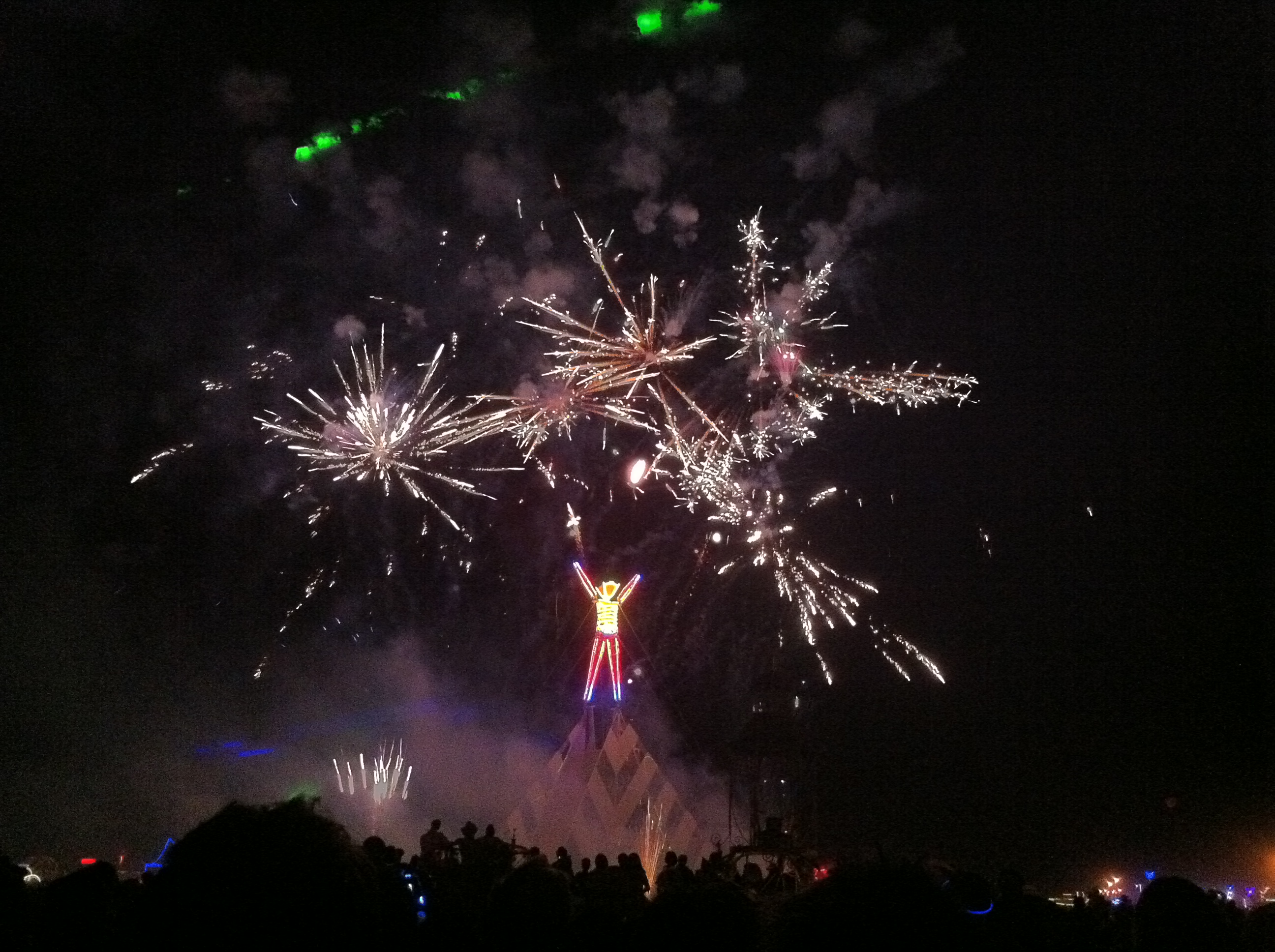
The man effigy with fireworks before being burned in 2011

Because of the variety of goals fostered by participatory attendees, known as "Burners," Burning Man does not have a single focus. Features of the event are subject to the participants and include community, artwork, absurdity, decommodification and revelry. Participation is encouraged.

The Burning Man event and its affiliated communities are guided by 10 principles meant to evoke the cultural ethos that has emerged from the event. They were originally written by Larry Harvey in 2004 as guidelines for regional organizing, then later became universal criteria of the general culture of the multifaceted movement. The 10 Principles are:

- radical inclusion
- gifting
- decommodification
- radical self-reliance
- radical self-expression
- communal effort
- civic responsibility
- leaving no trace
- participation
- immediacy

The descriptions in quotes are the actual text:

=== Radical inclusion ===
"Anyone may be a part of Burning Man. We welcome and respect the stranger. No prerequisites exist for participation in our community." This was written with a broad stroke for general organizing, meaning anyone is welcome to the Burning Man culture. Prerequisites for the Burning Man event are: participants are expected to provide for their own basic needs, follow the guidelines in the annually updated event "survival guide", and purchase a $475 ticket to get in.

=== Gifting ===
"Burning Man is devoted to acts of gift-giving. The value of a gift is unconditional. Gifting does not contemplate a return or an exchange for something of equal value." Instead of cash, burners are encouraged to rely on a gift economy, a sort of potlatch. In the earliest days of the event, an underground barter economy also existed, in which burners exchanged "favors" with each other. While this was originally supported by the Burning Man organization, it is now largely discouraged. Instead, burners are encouraged to give one another gifts unconditionally. Despite the efforts of the Burning Man organization, bartering still continues to be very common across certain camps.

=== Decommodification ===
"To preserve the spirit of gifting, our community seeks to create social environments that are unmediated by commercial sponsorships, transactions, or advertising. We stand ready to protect our culture from such exploitation. We resist the substitution of consumption for participatory experience." No cash transactions are permitted between burners. Cash can be used for a select few charity, fuel, and sanitation vendors as follows:

- Café beverages such as coffee, chai, lemonade, etc., which are sold at Center Camp Café, operated by the organizers of the event. Citing cost, decreased need, environmental impact, and decommodification, beverage sales were halted in 2022.
- Ice sales benefit the local Gerlach-Empire school system.
- Tickets for the shuttle bus to the nearest Nevada communities of Gerlach and Empire which is operated by a contractor not participating in the event: Green Tortoise.
- A reentry wristband, which allows a person to leave and reenter the event and may be purchased at the gate upon exit.
- An airport use fee, payable at the airport upon first entry.
- Diesel and biodiesel sold by third-party contractors.
- RV dump service and camp graywater disposal service.
- Private portable toilets and servicing, which can be arranged with the official contractor.

=== Radical self-reliance ===
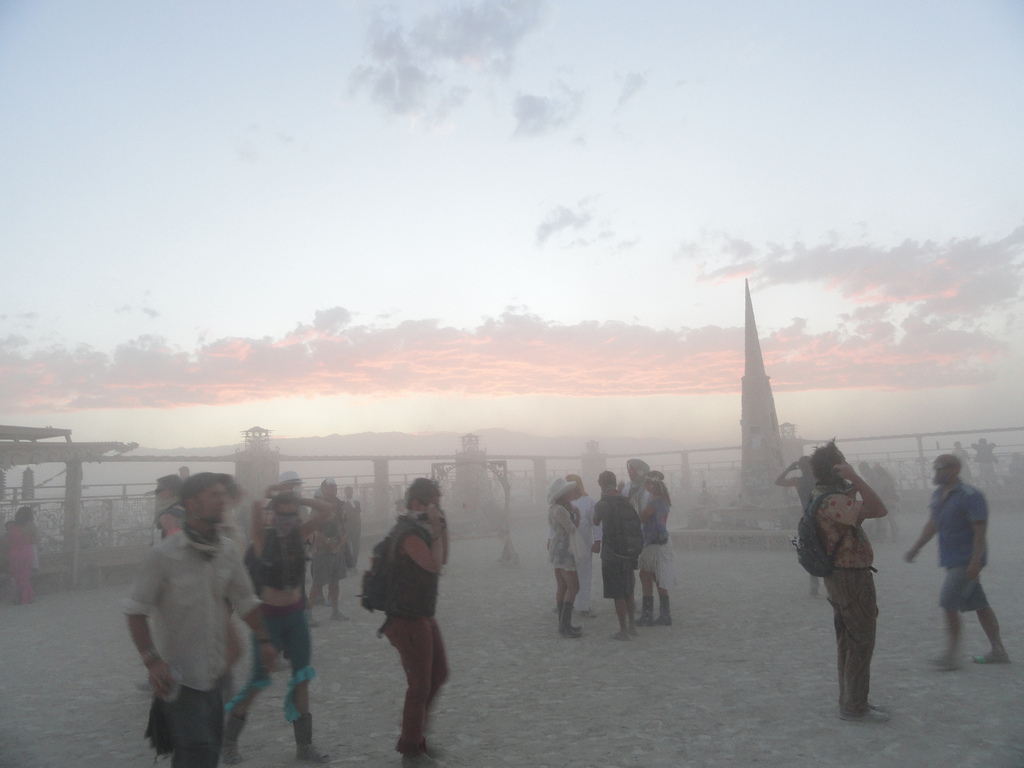
Dust storms are common at Burning Man, so many come prepared with appropriate protection such as goggles and masks to reduce dust inhalation.

"Burning Man encourages the individual to discover, exercise, and rely on his or her inner resources." The event's harsh environment and remote location require participants to be responsible for their subsistence. Since the LLC forbids most commerce, participants must be prepared and bring all their own supplies with the exception of the items stated in Decommodification. Public portable toilets are also available throughout the city; some of these are, like art cars, decorated in imaginative ways by volunteers.

=== Radical self-expression ===
Trojan Horse Pull – Burning Man 2011

"Radical self-expression arises from the unique gifts of the individual. No one other than the individual or a collaborating group can determine its content. It is offered as a gift to others. In this spirit, the giver should respect the rights and liberties of the recipient." Burners are encouraged to express themselves in a number of ways through various art forms and projects. The event is clothing-optional and public nudity is common, though not practiced by the majority.

=== Communal effort ===
"Our community values creative cooperation and collaboration. We strive to produce, promote and protect social networks, public spaces, works of art, and methods of communication that support such interaction." Burners are encouraged to work with and help one another.

=== Civic responsibility ===
"We value civil society. Community members who organize events should assume responsibility for public welfare and endeavor to communicate civic responsibilities to participants. They must also assume responsibility for conducting events in accordance with local, state and federal laws."

=== Leave no trace ===
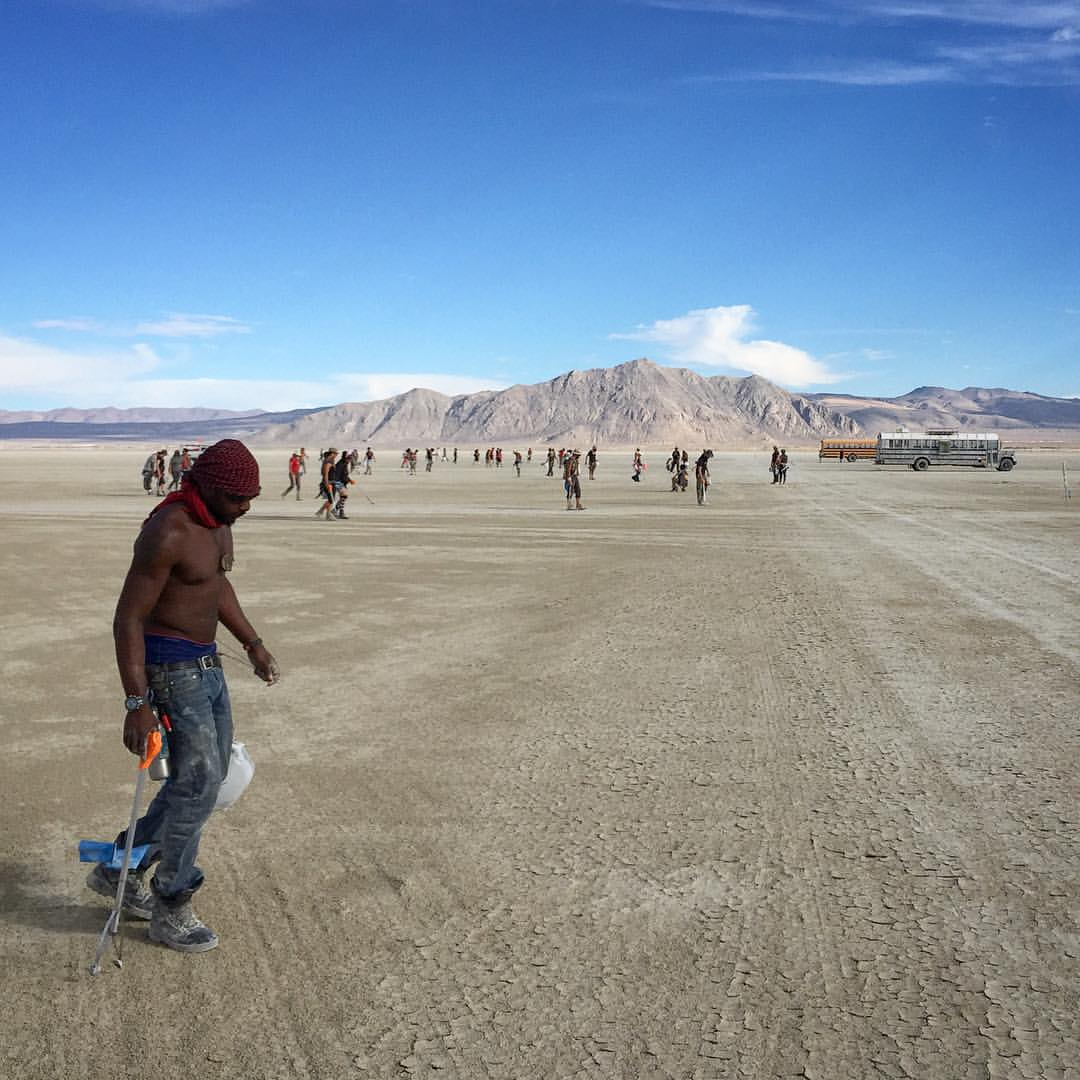
Burning Man Playa Restoration 2015 – attendees carry sticks and buckets to clean the desert of MOOP (matter out of place), as part of the "leave no trace" policy.

"Our community respects the environment. We are committed to leaving no physical trace of our activities wherever we gather. We clean up after ourselves and endeavor, whenever possible, to leave such places in a better state than when we found them."

=== Participation ===
"Our community is committed to a radically participatory ethic. We believe that transformative change, whether in the individual or in society, can occur only through the medium of deeply personal participation. We achieve being through doing. Everyone is invited to work. Everyone is invited to play. We make the world real through actions that open the heart." People are encouraged to participate, rather than observe.

=== Immediacy ===
"Immediate experience is, in many ways, the most important touchstone of value in our culture. We seek to overcome barriers that stand between us and a recognition of our inner selves, the reality of those around us, participation in society, and contact with a natural world exceeding human powers. No idea can substitute for this experience."

== The Temple ==
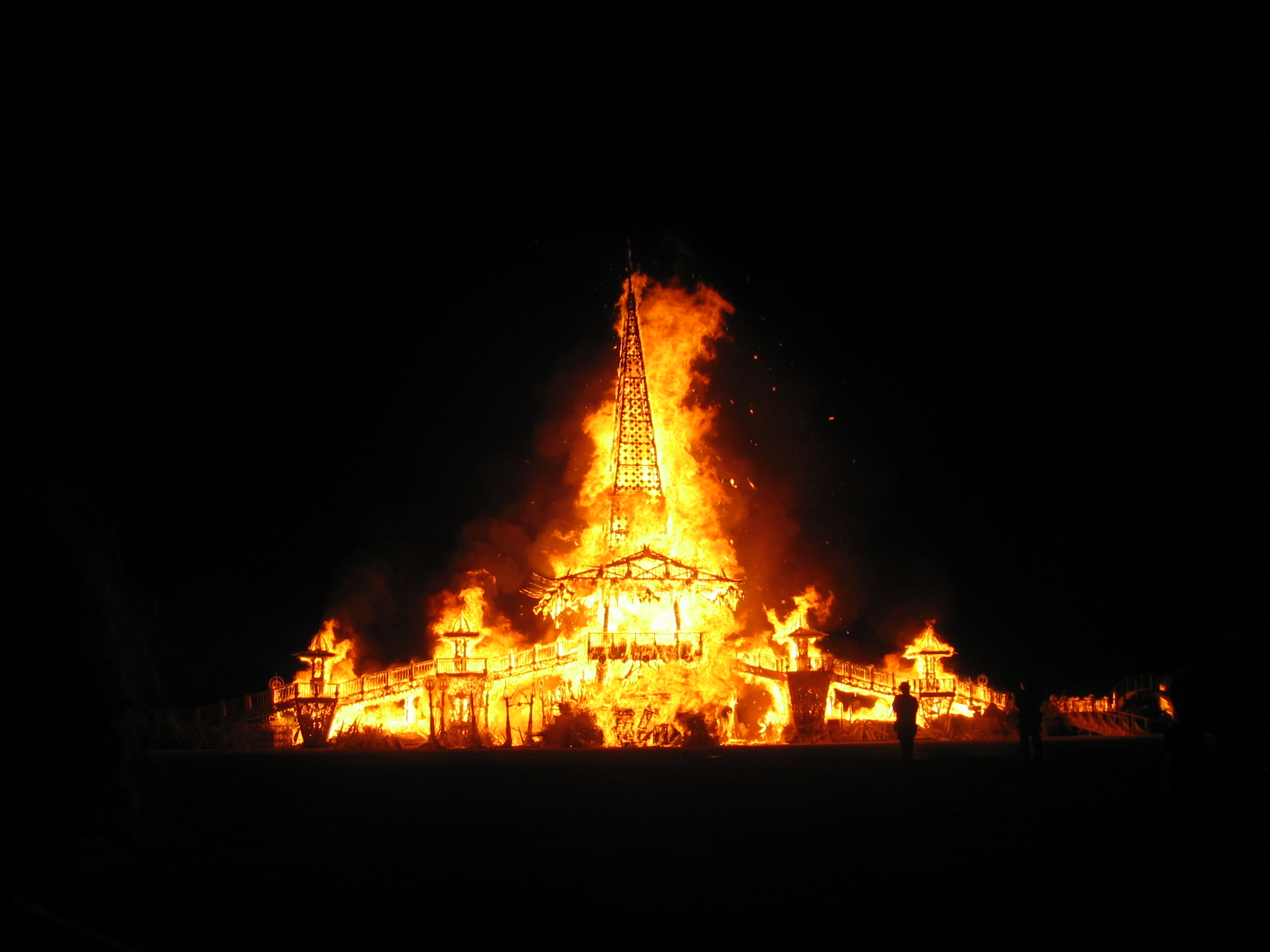
Temple of Stars, burning, 2004

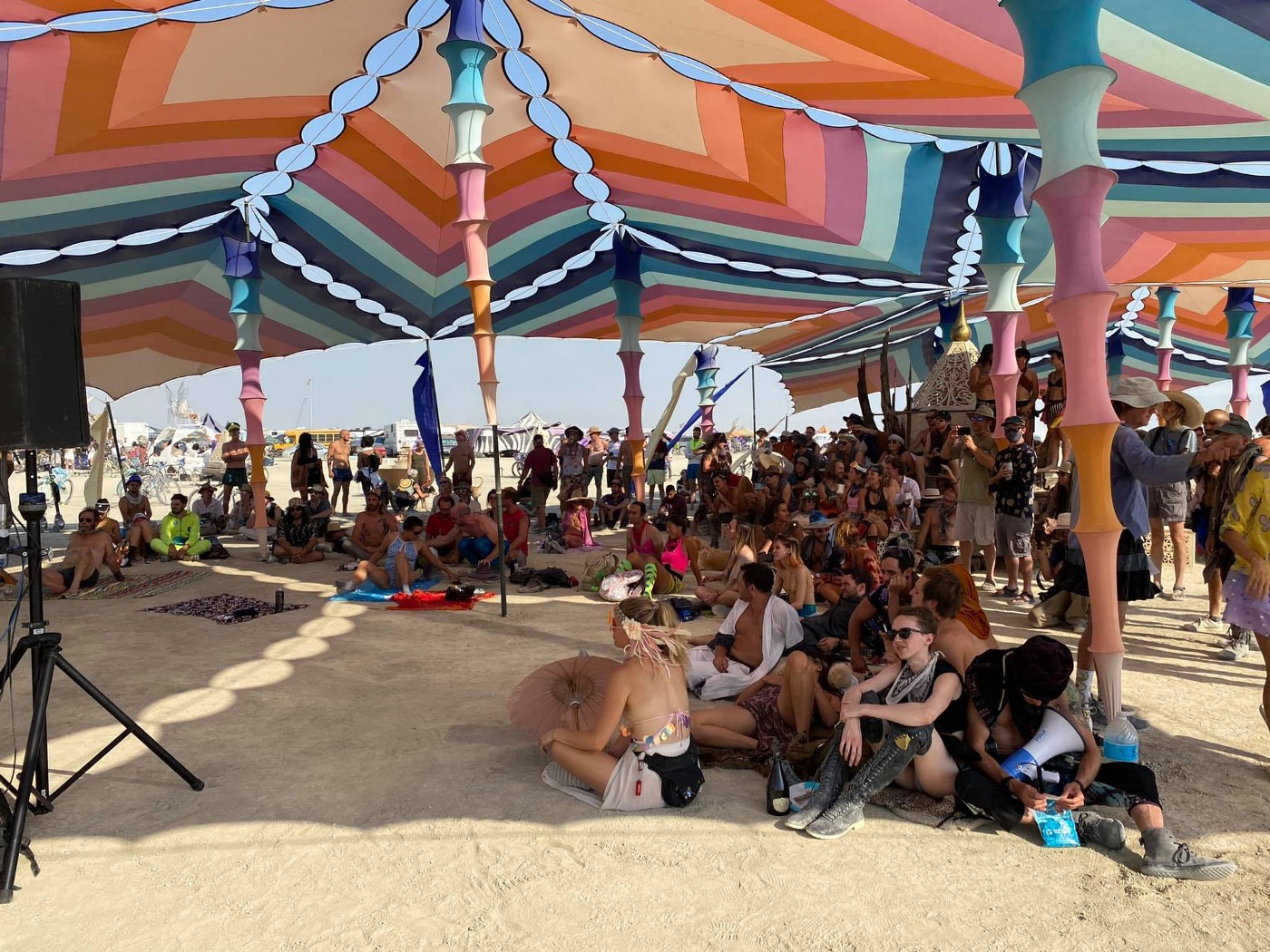
Temple of Constraints, 2021

The Temple is the secondary major recurring art installation at Burning Man after the Man, and is considered just as important to the event culture. According to the Burning Man Project, "The Temple is a community shared space that is an important part of Black Rock City. It is not a temple in recognition of any religion; it's a neutral, non-denominational spiritual space where everyone can gather to share in the experience of remembering the past, honoring or cursing the present, and pondering the future to come."

The prime function of the Temple is to be a canvas upon which people can leave words and objects behind to be burned, and to serve as "a place of contemplation, a place to rest, a place of reflection, a place of rituals, weddings, reunions, etc". During the event, 400 volunteer Temple Guardians monitor the Temple 24 hours a day. The Temple is burned on the eighth and final night of the event, following the "Man burn" on the previous night.

=== Timeline ===
| Year | Name | Designer(s) | Notes |
|---|---|---|---|
| 2000 | Temple of the Mind | David Best Jack Haye | Temple of the Mind was dedicated to Michael Hefflin, a Temple builder who died in a motorcycle accident. Other people left remembrances over the course of the event week, and the tradition of the Temple at Burning Man was born. |
| 2001 | Temple of Tears / Mausoleum | David Best Jack Haye | |
| 2002 | Temple of Joy | David Best | Temple of Joy was 100 ft (30 m) tall. |
| 2003 | Temple of Honor | David Best | |
| 2004 | Temple of Stars | David Best | Temple of Stars was the first temple that allowed participants to walk on. |
| 2005 | Temples of Dreams | Mark Grieve | David Best stepped aside to allow for another artist, Mark Grieve, to build his own interpretation of a Temple. Grieve's temples were seen in both 2005 and 2006. |
| 2006 | Temple of Hope | Mark Grieve | |
| 2007 | Temple of Forgiveness | David Best Tim Dawson | David Best took over the Temple building duties for what he thought would be one last time. Best stated that after 2007, it was time to hand the Temple over to the community. |
| 2008 | Basura Sagrada | Brent Allen Spears Tucker Teutsch | The "Basura Sagrada" (Spanish for "sacred trash") was a collaboration of Shrine and Tucker Teutsch 3.0, built with the extensive help of their friends and the greater Burning Man community. It was constructed largely from burnable trash and recycled materials. |
| 2009 | Fire of Fires | David Umlas Marrilee Ratcliffe | This was the first Temple built outside of California. Fire of Fires was built in Austin, Texas. |
| 2010 | Temple of Flux | Rebecca Anders Jess Hobbs Peter Kimelman | This group was notable for drawing from a broad section of the Burning Man community, including the large-scale sound camps and other existing BM art groups who formed The Flux Foundation. Temple of Flux was a major departure from previous Temple design at Burning Man and was highly abstract in nature, consisting of five double-curved walls that formed cave-like spaces. |
| 2011 | Temple of Transition | Chris Hankins Diarmaid Horkan Ian Beaverstock | This was the first Temple built in Reno, Nevada. The International Arts Megacrew, helmed by Chris "Kiwi" Hankins, Diarmaid "Irish" Horkan and Ian "Beave" Beaverstock returned to a more traditional style. Temple of Transition took the form of a central 120 ft (37 m) hexagonal tower, surrounded by five 58 ft (18 m) hexagonal towers. The towers were vaulted and lofty, cut with a profusion of gothic style arches. |
| 2012 | Temple of Juno | David Best | With the 2012 Temple came the return of David Best. The Temple of Juno incorporated a large central tower with central altar space, sitting within a 200 ft (61 m) walled courtyard lined with benches, accessed from four entrances. Intricately cut wooden panels and detailed shapes covered the courtyard walls as well as the interior space and altars. square walled courtyard. |
| 2013 | Temple of Whollyness | Gregg Fleishman Terry Gross Melissa Barron | This temple was created by The Otic Oasis team, led by architect and artist Gregg Fleishman, Terry Lightning "Clearwater III" Gross, and Melissa "Syn" Barron. This was the first Temple built without nails, bolts, adhesives, or fasteners of any kind. This Temple incorporated a massive 200 short tons (180,000 kg) black basalt Inuksuk sculpture created by artist, James LaFemina to act as the central altar. Conceptual artist and composer, Aaron 'Taylor' Kuffner, who debuted at Burning Man with the 2011 Temple of Transition, returned to contribute musical elements with a different execution of the Gamelatron. |
| 2014 | Temple of Grace | David Best | Following the sudden withdrawal of chosen 2014 Temple builder Ross Asselstine, who backed out of building the Temple of Descendants due to contract disagreements with the Burning Man Project, David Best came out of retirement a third time to build his eighth Temple. The Temple of Grace was intended to be a spiritual and sacred space for memorials, reflection, celebration, and to commemorate life transitions. The structure incorporated a central interior dome within a graceful curved body made of wood and steel. Again, it had intricately cut wooden panels for the exterior and interior skin. Eight altars surrounded the temple inside a low-walled courtyard, creating a large exterior grounds for the community. |
| 2015 | Temple of Promise | Jazz Tigan | This temple was created by Dreamers Guild and built primarily in Alameda, California. The temple welcomed participants through an archway soaring 97 ft (30 m) overhead. As the path continued to curve, it opened into the contemplative altar and the heart of the Temple: a grove of three sculpted trees. The branches were initially bare, and participants wrote messages on long strips of cloth and attached them to the trees, creating the gentle shade of weeping willows, increasing as the week progressed. The structure of the Temple tapered in and curled around to form a small courtyard containing wireframe tree sculptures. |
| 2016 | The Temple | David Best | David Best came out of retirement yet again to build a pagoda style temple. The wooden components of the Temple were cut by hand without the use of a CNC machine. |
| 2017 | The Temple | Marisha Farnsworth Steve Brummond Mark Sinclair | Designed by Steven Brummond, Marisha Farnsworth and Mark Sinclair (who acted as leads on prior David Best temples); two are architects and one is a structural engineer. It stood 80 ft (24 m) tall and 120 ft (37 m) across. They milled the lumber themselves, and most of the build was constructed at a sawmill in Sonora, California. |
| 2018 | Galaxia | Arthur Mamou-Mani | Designed by architect Arthur Mamou-Mani and built in two locations; Reno, Nevada, and Oakland, California. Galaxia was shaped by 20 timber trusses converging as a spiral towards one point in the sky. The triangular trusses formed different paths towards a central space holding a series of giant 3D printed mandalas or lanterns at the center that collectively formed a chandelier centerpiece. The timber modules started large enough to hold small alcoves in which people could interact with the structure in peace. As participants walked through the path, the modules lifted up and became thinner towards the sky as they reached the central mandala. |
| 2019 | Temple of Direction | Geordie Van Der Bosch | Designed by Geordie Van Der Bosch, was a 180 ft (55 m) long, 37 ft (11 m) wide, and 36 ft (11 m) tall structure, with four entrances facing the four cardinal directions of Black Rock City, 12, 3, 6, and 9 o’clock.[164] The Temple of Direction was a linear space, capturing the elegance and austerity of the Torii gates at the Fushimi Inari-taisha Shrine in Japan, where the artist has previously lived. |
| 2020 | Empyrean | Laurence Renzo Verbeck Sylvia Adrienne Lisse Jeremy Roush | Postponed due to the COVID-19 pandemic |
| 2021 | None | None | There was no official temple in 2021 due to the COVID-19 pandemic. There was however a virtual temple available online known as The Luminous Lotus Virtual Temple created by Simeone Scaramozzino and his Virtual Temple Team. |
| 2022 | Empyrean | Laurence Renzo Verbeck | Empyrean, originally selected for 2020, and which would have been the temple for 2021 if not for the COVID-19 pandemic became the de facto 2022 temple. During both years, with the event canceled, Empyrean was not built in the Black Rock Desert. However, in 2021 the Empyrean Temple Crew built a prototype in Santa Rosa, CA. In 2022, Burning Man resumed and Empyrean finally made it to the playa. |
| 2023 | Temple of the Heart | Ela Madej Reed Finlay | The Temple of the Heart was a communal sanctuary at Burning Man, designed as an inverted desert flower to embody connection, love, and reflection. Featuring three key elements—the Rose Altar, a luminous collection of community-made flowers symbolizing grief and love; the Heart Chamber, a central gathering space for meditation, music, and stillness; and the Ring of Offerings, an intimate area for contemplation—the Temple fosters healing and collective experience. Co-created with the Burning Man community, it serves as a sacred space for remembrance and renewal. |
| 2024 | Temple of Together | Caroline Ghosn | Temple of Together consisted of a Central Chamber surrounded by "Chapels of Wishes", enclosed in a fenced courtyard with shrines |
| 2025 | Temple of the Deep | Miguel Arraiz | The Temple of the Deep, designed by Miguel Arraiz, is a 44 ft (13 m) high sanctuary of reflection and healing, inspired by the volcanic rock of the Black Rock Desert. Its fractured, glowing surface evokes kintsugi, symbolizing resilience through imperfection. Seven entrances represent the stages of grief, guiding participants toward a communal space that mirrors Black Rock City's layout. Merging raw, organic elements with a futuristic vision, the Temple invites radical acceptance, offering a place to honor personal journeys and find peace in transformation. |
| 2026 | Temple of the Moon | James Gwertzman | The Temple of the Moon is inspired by the Queen of the Night, a desert cactus flower that blooms for a single night each year. The design calls for an approximately 170 ft (52 m) diameter structure with eight gateways corresponding to major phases of the moon and a central chamber rising to 52 ft (16 m). Crown petals above the chamber are designed to open at sunset and close at sunrise. |

=== Temple Builders Guild ===
The Temple Builders Guild (TBG) is a U.S.-based nonprofit public arts organization founded in 2020 by Thomas J. Lee and Nick Morgan—both experienced temple build crew members—to support the construction of large-scale community and municipal art projects, particularly the Temple at Burning Man. Established in response to the recurring logistical challenges faced by annual Temple builders, the organization was created to provide shared infrastructure, equipment, tools, facilities, and institutional knowledge that can be reused from year to year. TBG became a federally recognized 501(c)(3) nonprofit organization in 2021.

The Guild’s primary mission is to reduce waste, improve efficiency, and promote continuity across successive art projects by maintaining resources that would otherwise need to be repeatedly acquired, rented, or replaced. Although it is not the recipient of Burning Man’s annual Temple grant, TBG supports Temple construction teams and other community art projects through shared assets such as tool libraries, transportation and storage infrastructure, safety equipment, work facilities, and support services. The organization was founded on the principle that preserving tools, knowledge, and operational capacity across projects allows artists and builders to focus more on creativity and community engagement while improving the long-term sustainability of large-scale public art.

== Art ==
A hallmark of Burning Man is large-scale interactive installation art inspired by the intersection of maker culture, technology, and nature. Many works invite participation through climbing, touch, technological interfaces, or motion. At night much of the artwork is illuminated by fire or LEDs. Creative expression through art is encouraged at Burning Man in many forms. Music, performance art, and guerrilla theatre are art forms commonly presented within the camps and developed areas of the city. Artwork is placed in the open playa beyond the streets of the city. Each year hundreds of works of art, ranging from small to very large-scale, are brought to Black Rock City.

Art on the playa is assisted by a department of the Burning Man Project called the Artery, which helps artists place their art in the desert and ensures lighting to prevent collisions, burn platforms to protect the integrity of the dry lake bed, and that fire safety requirements are met. Art grants are available to participants via a system of curation and oversight, with application deadlines early in the year. Grants are intended to help artists produce work beyond the scope of their own means, and are generally intended to cover only a portion of the costs associated with creation of the pieces, usually requiring considerable reliance on an artist's community resources. Aggregate funding for all grants varies depending on the number and quality of the submissions (usually well over 100) but amounts to several percent (in the order of $500,000 in recent years) of the gross receipts from ticket sales. In 2006, 29 pieces were funded.

Various standards regarding the nature of the artworks eligible for grants are set by the Art Department, but compliance with the theme and interactivity are important considerations. This funding has fostered artistic communities, most notably in the Bay Area of California, the region that has historically provided a majority of the event's participants. There are active and successful outreach efforts to enlarge the regional scope of the event and the grant program.

=== No Spectators: The Art of Burning Man ===
In 2018, the Renwick Gallery of the Smithsonian American Art Museum in Washington, D.C., brought art from Burning Man to the nation's capital. The exhibition took over the entire Renwick Gallery building and surrounding neighborhood. The exhibit featured room-sized installations, costumes, and jewelry, while photographs and archival materials from the Nevada Museum of Art trace Burning Man's growth and its bohemian roots.

Large-scale installations form the core of the exhibition. Individual artists and collectives featured in the exhibit include David Best, Candy Chang, Marco Cochrane, Duane Flatmo, Michael Garlington and Natalia Bertotti, Five Ton Crane Arts Collective, FoldHaus Art Collective, Scott Froschauer, HYBYCOZO, (Yelena Filipchuk and Serge Beaulieu), Android Jones, Aaron Taylor Kuffner, Christopher Schardt, Richard Wilks, and Leo Villareal.

In addition, multiple large-scale public Burning Man art installations were exhibited throughout the neighborhood surrounding the museum, for an extension of the show No Spectators: Beyond the Renwick, which included works by Jack Champion, Mr. and Mrs. Ferguson, HYBYCOZO, Laura Kimpton, Kate Raudenbush, and Mischell Riley. All outdoor works had been installed as honorarium artwork at Burning Man in years past, except for the artwork by Hybycozo. This outdoor exhibition was co-produced by a first ever collaboration with the Golden Triangle BID (Business Improvement District in Washington DC), curated by Karyn Miller.

== Mutant vehicles ==
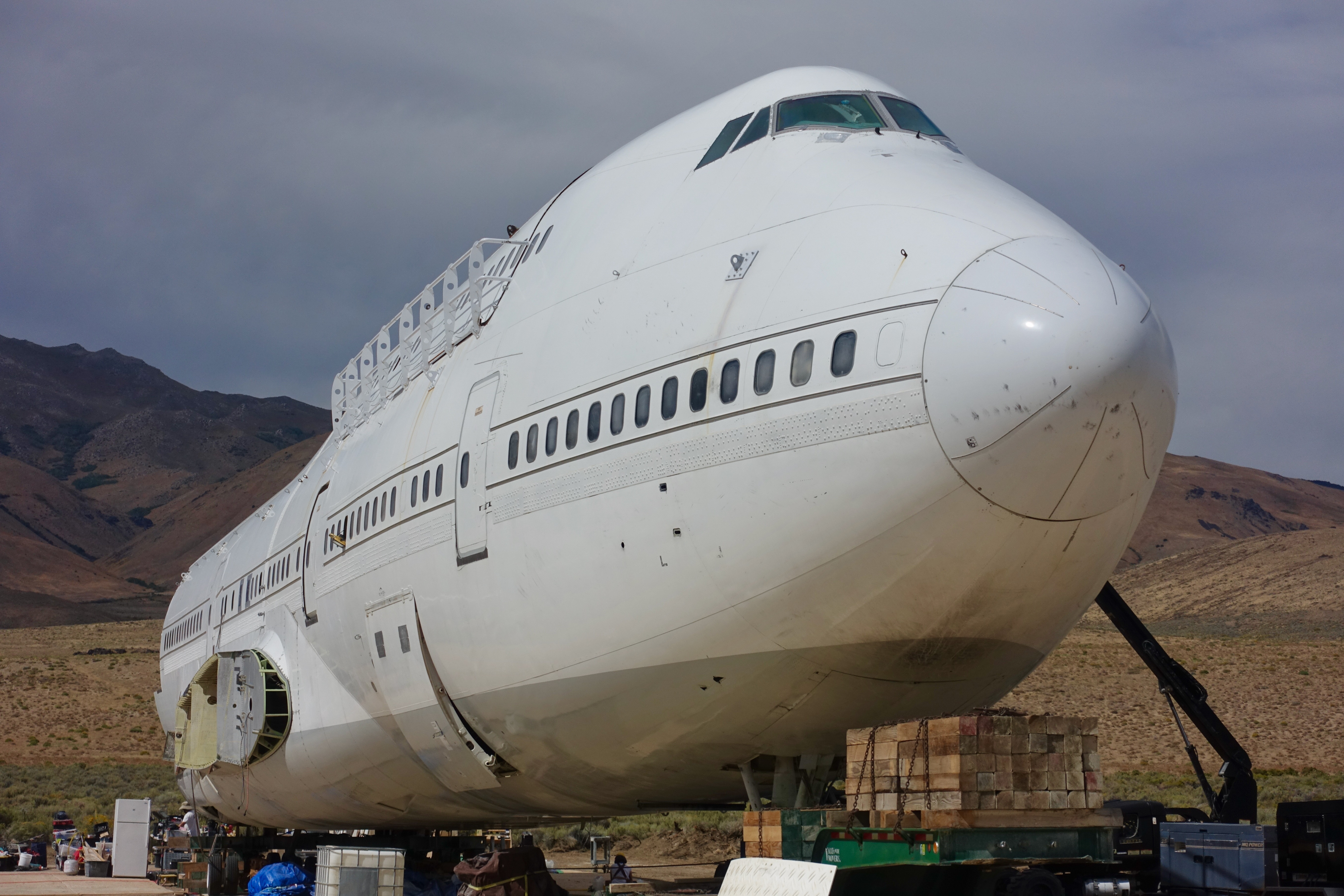
Boeing 747 mobile disco, 2012

Mutant Vehicles are purpose-built or creatively altered motorized vehicles. The term "Mutant Vehicle" was coined by organizers of the Burning Man event to delineate a type of "Art Car" that was more dramatically modified than simply decorating an existing vehicle.

Burning Man participants who wish to bring motorized mutant vehicles must submit their designs in advance to the event's own DMV or "Department of Mutant Vehicles" for consideration. If a vehicle design meets the "Mutant Vehicle Criteria," the vehicle is invited to the event for a final physical inspection and licensing at the event. Not all designs and proposals are accepted.

The event organizers, and the DMV, have set the bar high for what it deems an acceptable MV each year, in effect capping the number of Mutant Vehicles. This is in response to constraints imposed by the U.S. Bureau of Land Management, which grants permits to hold the event on federal property, and to participants who want to maintain a pedestrian-friendly environment. Vehicles that are minimally altered, and/or whose primary function is to transport participants, are discouraged and not invited.

One of the criteria the DMV employs to determine whether an application for a proposed Mutant Vehicle is approved is "can you recognize the base vehicle". For example, if a 1967 VW van covered with glitter, dolls' heads, and old cooking utensils can still be recognized as a VW van, the DMV would consider it an "Art Car," but it would not be sufficiently altered to meet the Mutant Vehicle Criteria.

There were over six hundred approved Mutant Vehicles at the event in 2010.

== Bicycles ==
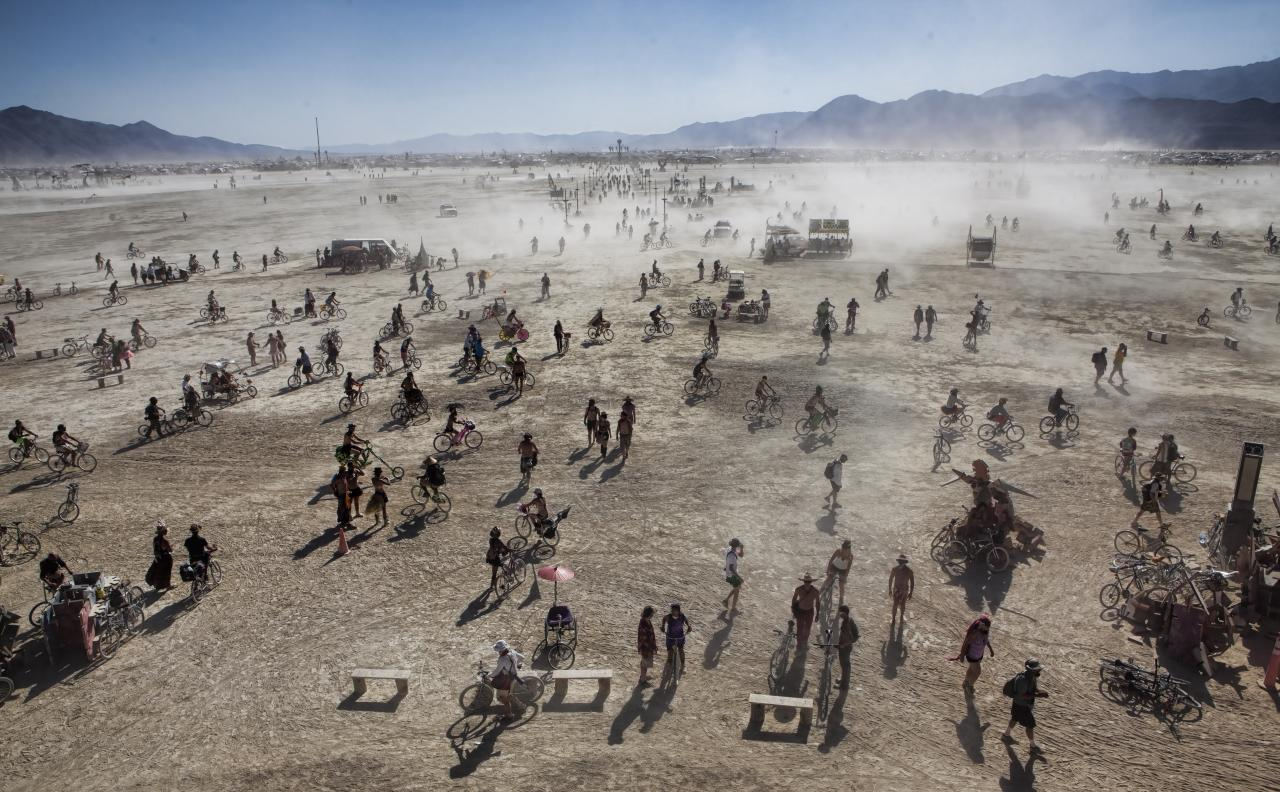
Cyclists at Burning Man, 2010

Bicycles and tricycles are popular for getting around on the dry lake. Mountain bikes are generally preferred over road bikes for riding on the dried silt, which is normally hard but becomes loose with traffic. Participants often decorate their bikes to make them unique. Since lighting on the bikes is critically important for safety at night, many participants incorporate the lighting into their decorations, using electroluminescent wire to create intricate patterns over the frame of the bike. Every night during Burning Man, thousands of people on their bikes and art cars, illuminated sculptures and stages create a unique visual effect.

== Theme camps ==
=== Electronic music ===
Camps focusing on electronic music, often played by live DJs, began to appear in 1992, an influence of the rave culture of the San Francisco area. Terbo Ted was identified as the first ever DJ in Burning Man history, opening with a Jean Michel Jarre song played off a vinyl record. DJs typically occupied an area on the outskirts of the Playa nicknamed the "Techno Ghetto". In later years, certain spokes of the main camp were designated for "sound camps", with limits on volume and speaker positioning, angled away from the center of Black Rock City.

To work around the rules, mutant vehicles with live DJs and large sound systems began to appear as well. A number of major electronic music camps have been well-known returnees at Burning Man, including Opulent Temple and Robot Heart. Major producers and DJs representing various eras and genres have performed at Burning Man, however DJ events or "lineups" are discouraged from being publicized in the spirit of decommodification and immediacy.

In recent years, concerns began to surface among attendees that a growing number of "mainstream" electronic dance music acts had begun to appear. In 2015, organizers established a new area known as the "Deep Playa Music Zone" to serve as a new host for art cars featuring live DJs. Many big-name DJs have played sets over the years, including Carl Cox, Tycho, Lee Burridge, Skrillex, Above & Beyond, Black Coffee, Solomun, Sven Väth, David Morales, Richie Hawtin, Michel von Tell, Paul Oakenfold, Guy Gerber, Bonobo, Bedouin, Slander, and Thievery Corporation.

== Black Rock City ==
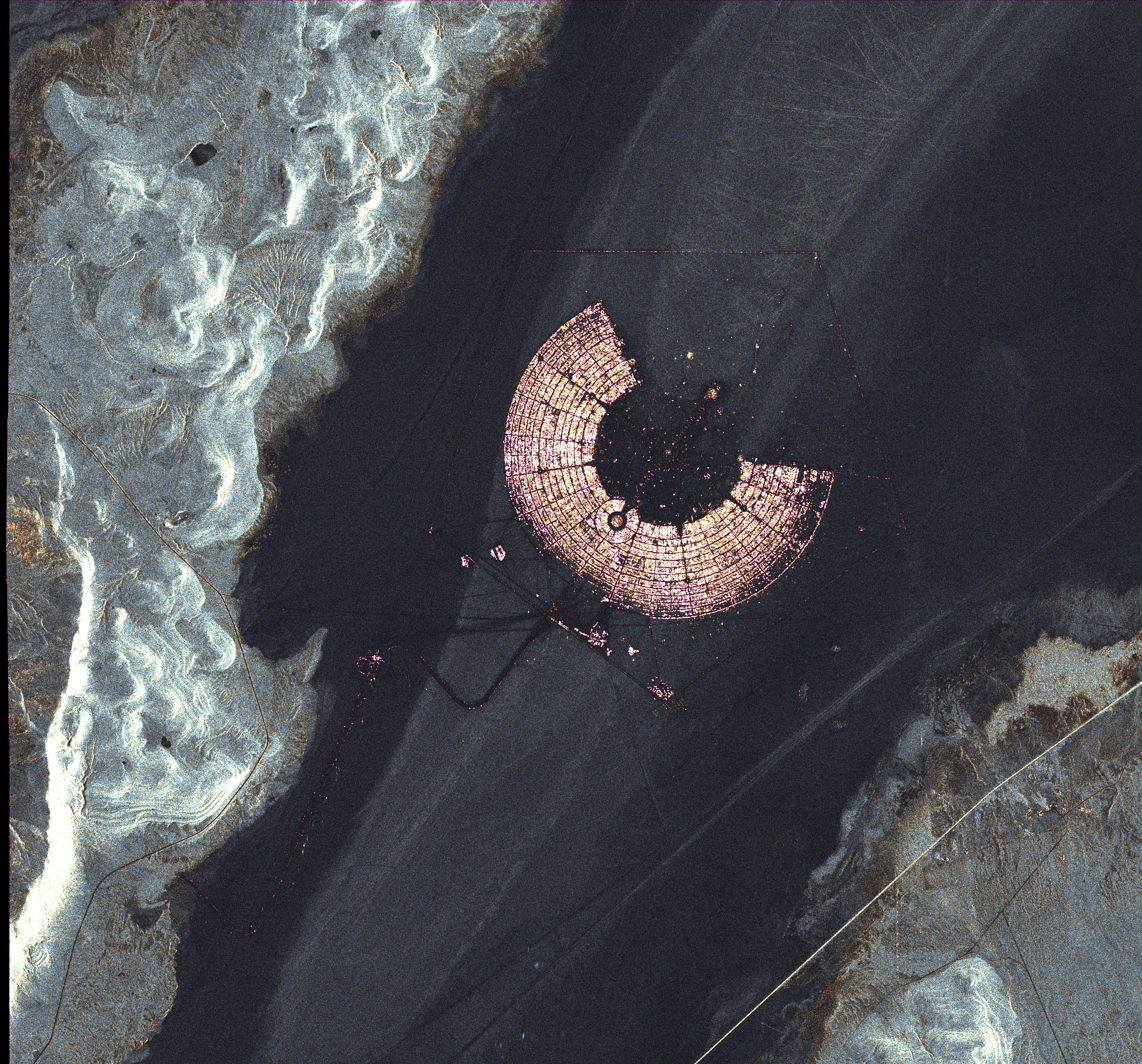
Satellite image of Black Rock City taken from the TerraSAR-X satellite, 2011

Aerial views of Black Rock City, 2012

Aerial night views of Black Rock City, 2014

Black Rock City, often abbreviated to BRC, is the temporary city created by Burning Man participants. Much of the layout and general city infrastructure is constructed by Department of Public Works (DPW) volunteers who often reside in Black Rock City for several weeks before and after the event. The remainder of the city including theme camps, villages, art installations and individual camping are all created by participants.

=== City planning ===
The developed part of the city is arranged as a series of concentric streets in an arc composing, since 1999, two-thirds of a 1.5-mile (2.4-km) diameter circle with the Man at the center. Radial streets, sometimes called Avenues, extend from the Man to the outermost circle. The outlines of these streets are visible on aerial photographs. The "missing" third of the circle, along with the open interior, is used for art installations.

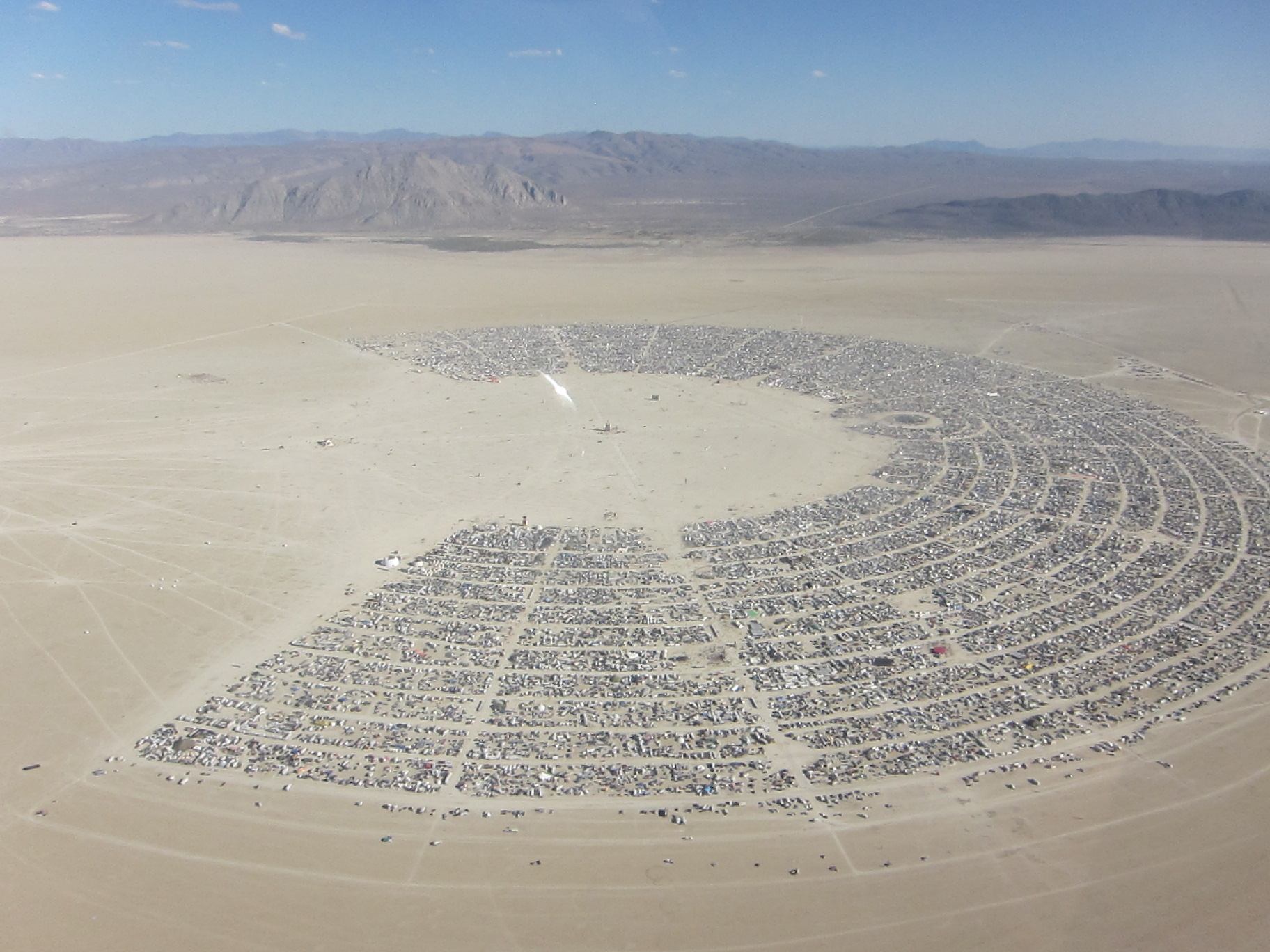
Oblique aerial photo of Black Rock City showing the familiar "C" pattern, 2010

The innermost street is named the Esplanade. The remaining streets are given names to coincide with the overall theme of the burn, and ordered in ways such as alphabetical order or stem to stern, to make them easier to recall. For example, in 1999, for the "Wheel of Time" theme, and again in 2004 for "The Vault of Heaven" theme, the streets were named after the planets of the Solar System. The radial streets are usually given a clock designation, for example, 6:00 or 6:15, in which the Man is at the center of the clock face. 12:00 is in the middle of the third of the arc lacking streets, usually at a bearing of 60° true from the Man.

These avenues have been identified in other ways, notably in 2002, in accordance with "The Floating World" theme, as the degrees of a compass. For example 175 degrees, and in 2003 as part of the Beyond Belief theme as adjectives ("Rational, Absurd") that caused every intersection with a concentric street, named after concepts of belief such as "Authority, Creed", to form a phrase such as "Absurd Authority" or "Rational Creed." These proved unpopular with participants due to difficulty in navigating the city without the familiar clock layout.

The Black Rock City Airport is constructed adjacent to the city, typically on its southern side.

=== Center Camp ===
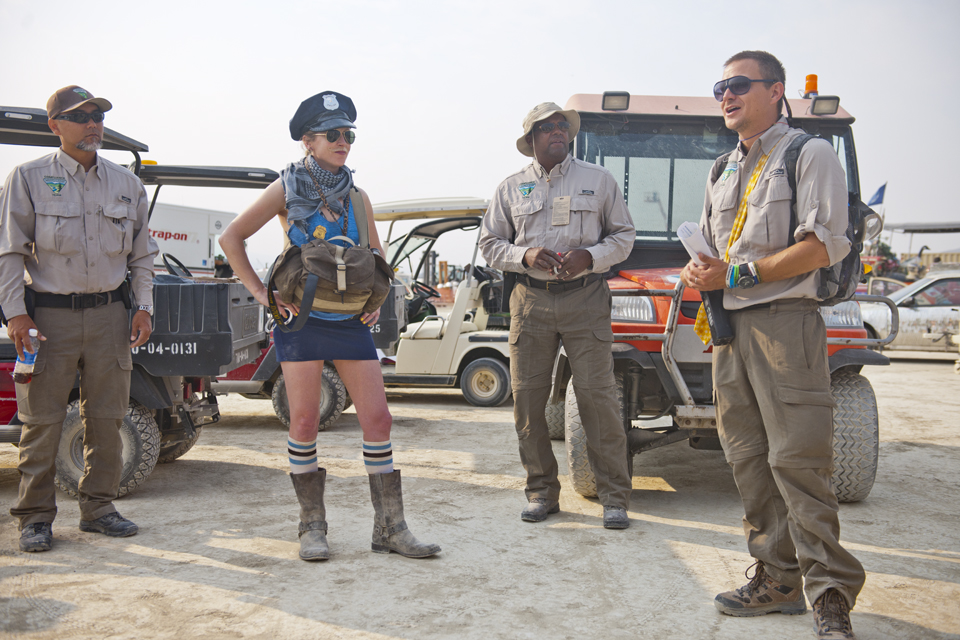
Bureau of Land Management officials with a civilian liaison at Burning Man

Center Camp is along the midline of Black Rock City, facing the Man opposite on the Esplanade. This area serves as a central meeting place for the city and contains the Center Camp Cafe, and a number of other city operations such as camps supporting public radio (BMIR 94.5 FM), Earth Guardians, Recycling Camp, Ranger Outposts, BLM and ESD (Emergency Response), and Arctica (ice).

=== Villages and theme camps ===
Villages and theme camps are along the innermost streets of Black Rock City, often offering entertainment or gifts to participants.

Theme camps are a collective of anywhere between a few participants, to several hundred participants, representing themselves under a unique value offering. To qualify as a "theme camp", and therefore be granted placement in BRC, you must apply through official Burning Man placement channels.

Furthermore, "Villages" exist in Black Rock City and are collections of theme camps which share common values, and coordinate resources between their "village" of individual theme camps.

Theme camps and villages, as well as "open campers" who are free to camp outside of Placement boundaries, form to create an atmosphere in Black Rock City that they have collectively envisioned. As Burning Man grows it attracts an ever more diverse crowd. Subcultures form around theme camps at Black Rock City similar to what can be found in other cities.

=== Volunteers ===
The Burning Man event is heavily dependent on a large number of volunteers.

=== Safety, policing and regulations ===
Black Rock City is patrolled by various local and state law enforcement agencies as well as the Bureau of Land Management Rangers. The local police issue $1,500 fines for drug use and serving alcohol to minors. Burning Man also has its own in-house group of volunteers, the Black Rock Rangers, who act as informal mediators when disputes arise.

Firefighting, emergency medical services (EMS), mental health, and communications support is provided by the volunteer Black Rock City Emergency Services Department (ESD). Three "MASH"-like stations are set up in the city: station 3, 6, and 9. Station 6 is staffed by physicians and nurses working with a contracted state licensed ALS Medical provider. Stations 3 and 9 are staffed by Black Rock City ESD personnel. While Station 3 and 9 provide emergency services and basic life support, the volunteers are generally doctors, nurses, EMTs/paramedics, and firefighters. Both station 3 and 9 have a small fire engine available in addition to a Hazardous material/Rescue truck and quick response vehicle for medical emergencies.

In documents from February 2013 first made public in August 2015, it was revealed that in August 2010, the Federal Bureau of Investigation had sent a memo to its field offices in Nevada stating that it would patrol Burning Man to "aid in the prevention of terrorist activities and intelligence collection". Although a threat assessment performed by the FBI determined that drug usage and crowd control were the only major threats to Burning Man, the Bureau still sent an unspecified number of undercover agents to the event, with "no adverse threats or reactions".

== Black Rock City design evolution ==
=== 1986–1991 ===
From the very beginning on Baker Beach, to 1991 when Burning Man was set into its desert home, there was no real organizational structure to the city. According to Rod Garrett, designer of Black Rock City, "The original form of the camp was a circle. This was not particularly planned, but formed instinctively from the traditional campfire circle and the urge to 'circle the wagons' against the nearly boundless space." This did not work much longer, as attendance was reaching into the hundreds, and such a large gathering required some planning.

=== 1992–1995 ===
The Bureau of Land Management took notice of the event, and required that plans be drawn up to maintain safety. They required the Burn to be registered as an official event. In response, four cardinal roads were added emanating from center camp. The Man was located 100 yd (91 m) west of Center camp, due to the camp being oriented with the path of the sun across the sky, as opposed to north-to-south. The center circle from the birth of the event was maintained.

In 1993, the first sound camp was opened. It was known as the Techno Ghetto, and it was located two miles north of Center Camp. It was not a usual theme camp, but was instead a mini hub on its own. There was a small "center camp" with a message board and Port-a-potties. The center was surrounded by a circle of camping area 1,200 ft (370 m) across. Six massive sound systems faced out from the circle. The Techno Ghetto was placed separately to keep the 'rave' out of the main event. As time has progressed, music has become more and more closely tied into the core culture of Burning Man, even spawning a unique genre known as Playa Tech.

=== 1996 ===
With the population growing to 8,000 in 1996, more structure was essential to both appease the Bureau of Land Management and to maintain safety. A ring around Center Camp, named Ring Road, was added to provide for a second circle of theme camps. The eastern section of the circle around Center Camp, in a cone shape, was declared a "No Man's Land", devoid of all art installations and campsites. The goal was to provide a picturesque view from Center Camp of the Man in the distance. In addition to the camps circling the center, there were camps lining the outside of the No Man's Land cone.

The techno ghetto had its last year in 1996. Regardless, the spark of music had ignited, and other sound camps followed.

=== 1997 ===
In 1997 Burning Man was relocated off of the Playa to the Hualapai Flat, due to political problems with Washoe County. Black Rock City truly became a city in 1997, with formal, labeled streets, zoning, and registration for vehicles and theme camps. Rod Garret was brought on board as the lead designer of Black Rock City from then on. In his design, Center Camp remained the starting point, with two angular arms reaching out on either side to form a shallow "V" shape around the Man. These main arms consisted of six annular roads, and two outlying plazas. 1997 was the first year of a Ranger-patrolled perimeter, and the first year of one entry gate.

=== 1998 ===
Burning Man returned to the playa in 1998, and the basis of the modern layout was implemented. The idea was to "recreate some of the intimacy of our original camping circle, but on a much larger civic scale". Rod Garret's design smoothed out the angular "V" from 1997 and implemented the arc. In 1998, it stretched less than half-way around the circle. The radial streets were numbered North 1–20 and South 1–20, instead of the modern clock face system of names such as 11:30 or 5:15. There were four large plazas, each occupied by a major theme camp.

=== 1999–2010 ===
In 1999, for the Wheel of Time theme, the great arc of the city was expanded to the full 240° (2/3 of a circle) that it is today. The streets were renumbered to correspond to a clock face. The Man was in the center, Center Camp at 6:00, and streets every 30 minutes (15°) 2:00 through 10:00.

2000 saw the introduction of the Temple as a fixture on the playa, and it has grown to be easily as important as the Man. It was placed at 12:00 out in the deep playa in the open third of the circle. 2000 introduced the concept of a loud side. A quiet side was replaced by the rule that large scale sound camps would be placed at the 10:00 and 2:00 edges, facing out into the deep playa.

Extra annular streets have been added, as need has increased.

=== 2011–present ===
In 2011, extra radial streets were added, from G street out, to make outer-city navigation easier. These streets were added at intervals of fifteen minutes.

== Transportation ==
=== Road access ===
Highway 34 provides access to the main entrance to Black Rock City. The highway connects to Highway 447 north of Gerlach, which then runs south to Highway 427 in Wadsworth near Interstate 80.

Vehicles then proceed from the Highway 34 entrance north to the main gate via Gate Road, a desert dirt road with a speed limit of 10 mph. All vehicles driving into the city must have the appropriate vehicle pass. All occupants are required to have valid tickets in order to get in. Vehicles are searched for any items that are prohibited in the city. For those who have their tickets held at Will Call, the booths are located between the Highway 34 entrance and the main gate.

All tickets and vehicle passes must be bought in advance. They are not directly sold outside the gate or at the Will Call booths. Unless they have a valid early arrival pass for the pre-event set up, any vehicle who arrives before the gate opens is turned away and told to go back to Reno, and not to wait along the side of the road on either Highways 34 or 447, which would be a safety hazard, nor stay in Gerlach, and overcrowd the small town.

When the Burning Man ends, and the mass exodus from Black Rock City begins, a road traffic control procedure called "Pulsing" is used to direct vehicles out of the city. At regular intervals, usually an hour during the peak periods, all vehicles are "pulsed" forward all at once for about a mile along Gate Road. This allows vehicles to stop and turn off their engines, while those at the southernmost mile of the multi-lane Gate Road slowly merge and then turn onto the two-lane Highway 34.

=== Commercial airports ===
The airport with regular commercial service closest to the event is the Reno–Tahoe International Airport in Reno, Nevada, over two hours' drive away. In 2018 an estimated 18,000 burners arrived and departed through Reno's airport for the event, giving the airport an $11 million boost. Inside the airport that year, a Burning Man-specific information table was created and placed near the baggage claim area.

San Francisco International Airport, nearly six hours away by car, is the nearest airport with a high volume of international service. Other prominent airports, albeit with less international passenger traffic and more domestic services, are Sacramento International Airport, a 4.5-hour drive from Black Rock City, as well as other Bay Area airports such as Oakland International Airport and San Jose International Airport.

Salt Lake City International Airport, serving Salt Lake City, Utah, and Harry Reid International Airport, serving Las Vegas, Nevada, are both an 8.5-hour drive to Black Rock City.

=== Temporary airport ===
A section of the Playa is used for a temporary airport, which is set up before each event and completely erased afterward. It serves both general aviation and charter flights. Pilots began camping there about 1995. Once compelled to add structure, in 1999, it was established in a form acceptable to the BLM through the efforts of Tiger Tiger (Lissa Shoun) and LLC board member Mr. Klean (Will Roger). In 2009, it was recognized by the FAA as a private airport and designated 88NV. It is found on the Klamath Falls Sectional, using a CTAF of 122.9 MHz.

Black Rock UNICOM and the airport are operational on that frequency from 6:00 am to 7:30 pm PDT each day during the event. The runway is simply a compacted strip of playa, and is not lighted. Because of the unique air traffic and safety issues associated with the airport, pilots are strongly encouraged to familiarize themselves with published information and procedures provided by, for example, AOPA. Because of the changes in the surface of the playa each year, information about the airport is subject to change.

=== Shuttles ===
There are prepaid shuttles originating in Reno and San Francisco that move participants to and from the event. During the event there was also a paid shuttle between the event and the nearby towns of Gerlach and Empire, but this has been discontinued. Exiting and reentering the event requires an additional fee, and is highly discouraged.

=== Other ===
Participants share rides and hitchhike, although walking or bicycling into the event is not allowed.

== "Leave No Trace" policy ==
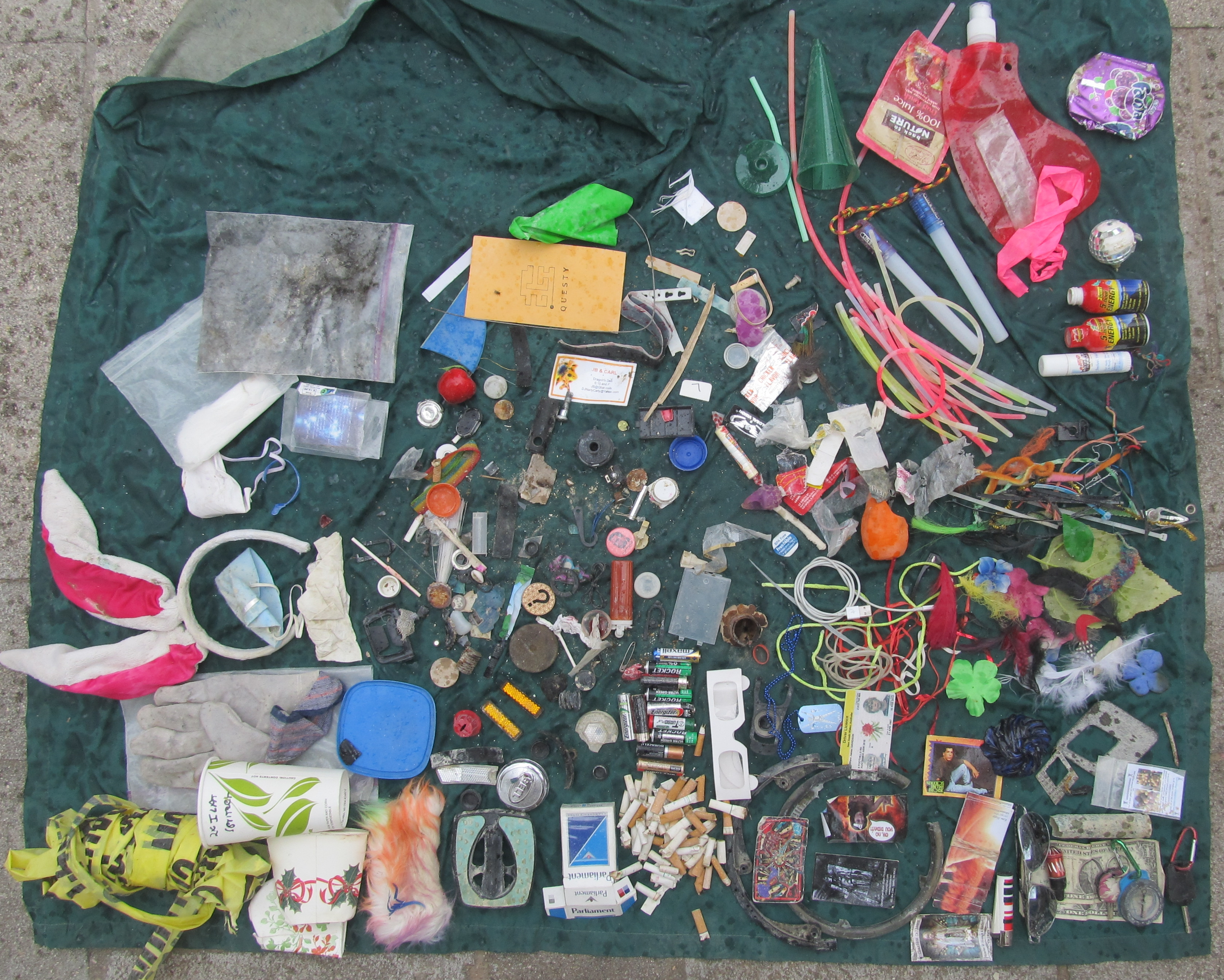
A collection of MOOP (Matter Out of Place), 2013

Burning Man takes place in the middle of a large playa. While not inhabited by humans itself, the area around the playa is home to many animals and plants. Supporters of Burning Man point out that participants are encouraged to leave no trace (LNT) of their visit to Black Rock City (BRC) and to not contaminate the area with litter, commonly known as MOOP (Matter Out of Place). Despite the BLM and LLC's insistence on the practice of LNT, the amount of residual trash at the site has increased over the years.

While fire is a primary component of many art exhibits and events, materials must be burned on a burn platform. From 1990 through 1999, burning was allowed to take place directly on the surface of the playa, but this left burn scars (fired pinkish clay-like playa surface). When it was determined in 2000 that the burn scars do not dissipate with the annual winter rains and flooding, the organization declared that fires had to be elevated from the playa surface for its protection.

When it was discovered by two of the founders of the Friends of Black Rock / High Rock (Garth Elliott and Sue Weeks) and BLM Winnemucca district director Terry Reid that burn scars from prior sites (numbering 250) still remained, they were eradicated in 2000 by the DPW clean up crew headed by Dan Miller.

On the last day of the event, public shared burn areas are prepared for participants to use. It is an ongoing educational process each year to encourage participants to protect the environment and other participants by not burning toxic materials.

Even gray water is not to be dumped on the playa. Used shower water must be captured and either evaporated off or collected and carried home with participants or disposed of by roving septic-pumping trucks, which also service RVs. Methods used for evaporating water often include a plastic sheet with a wood frame.

The Bureau of Land Management, which maintains the desert, has very strict requirements for the event. These stipulations include trash cleanup, removal of burn scars, dust abatement, and capture of fluid drippings from participant vehicles. For four weeks after the event has ended, the Black Rock City Department of Public Works (BRC – DPW) Playa Restoration Crew remains in the desert, cleaning up after the temporary city in an effort to make sure that no evidence of the event remains.

In spite of the event's clean up policies, Pershing County Sheriff Jerry Allen has stated that each event typically leaves a fair amount of detritus littered across the desert. He said that the leftover trash, including abandoned vehicles, was particularly heavy after the 2023 event.

== Lawsuit against geothermal energy exploration ==
In 2023, Burning Man filed a lawsuit against exploration of geothermal energy, a renewable green energy source, in the Nevada desert. Subsequently, county commissioners rescinded a permit for the geothermal energy exploration, putting the project indefinitely on halt and potentially scuttling it all together. The Burning Man organization celebrated the move.

== Controversies ==
=== Detention of Emergency Services Staff ===
In 2022, Hanna Hoekstra, a forensic nurse and Burning Man Emergency Services staff volunteer, was detained while working at Burning Man by the Pershing County Sheriff's Office. Hoekstra was released without charge and has filed a lawsuit against the Pershing County Sheriff's Office for unlawful detention. At the time of her detention, Hoekstra was assisting a patient who had requested help and was explaining to deputy that the patient had expressed that she did not desire to speak with law enforcement.

Body-camera footage was later released indicating that Hoekstra was arrested after Burning Man staff persistently delayed a female Pershing County Sheriff investigator, who was dressed in plainclothes, from speaking to two alleged victims of sexual assault. The investigator at the scene had told the staff that they did not wish to comply with their demands that the investigator wait until Burning Man staff had spoken to the alleged victims first. The investigator reasoned that similar cases resulted in event staff persuading alleged victims from not reporting their assaults to law enforcement. In the footage Hoekstra seemed to be insisting that she was speaking on behalf of one alleged victim and told the investigator that the victim did not wish to speak to law enforcement. It was at this point that the investigator's supervisor indicated to detain Hoekstra.

== Criticism ==
=== Negative effects on the environment ===
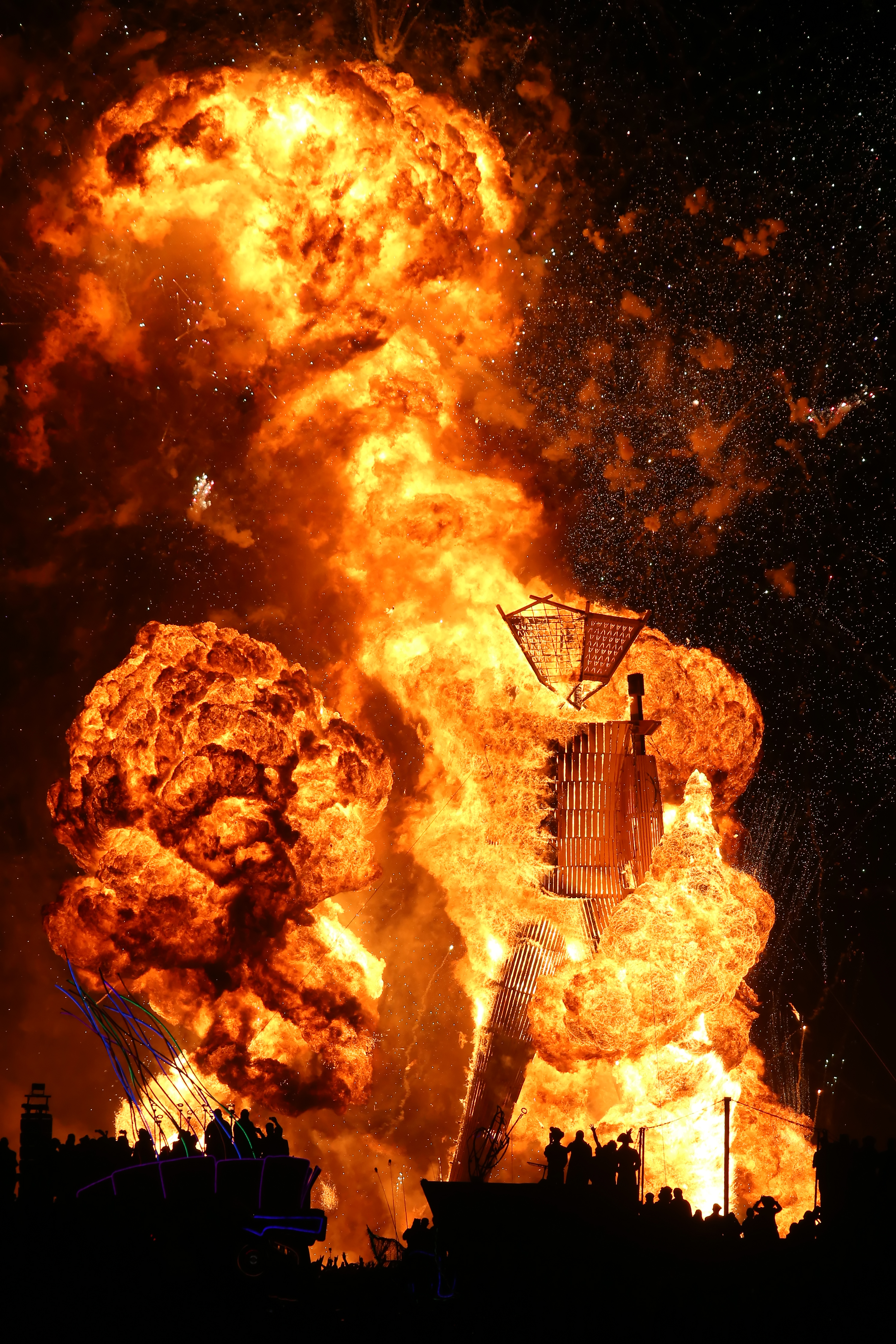
The Man burns at Burning Man, 2014

Burning Man's carbon footprint is primarily from transportation to the remote area. The CoolingMan organization has estimated that the 2006 Burning Man was responsible for the generation of 27,000 tons of carbon dioxide, with 87% being from transportation to and from the location. In 2010, The Sierra Club criticized Burning Man for the "hundreds of thousands" of plastic water bottles that end up in landfills, as well as ostentatious displays of flames and explosions.

Burning Man's 2007 theme "Green Man" received criticism for the artwork Crude Awakening, a 99-foot (30 m) oil derrick that consumed 900 U.S. gallons (3,400 L) of jet fuel and 2,000 U.S. gallons (7,600 L) of liquid propane to blast a mushroom cloud 300 feet (91 m) high into the sky.

In an attempt to offset some of the event's carbon footprint, 30- and 50-kilowatt solar arrays were constructed in 2007 as permanent artifacts, providing an estimated annual carbon offset of 559 tons. The Burn Clean Project is a volunteer organization that has helped replace the use of fossil fuel with biodiesel. In 2023 a group of climate activists blockaded the road into Black Rock city.

Scientists have noted "scars" on the playa, the dry lake bed the event takes place upon, especially during rainy years. The playa hosts fairy shrimp, water fleas and tadpole shrimp eggs which hatch only after rain and which may be harmed by mechanical damage to the playa during the event. Burning Man also increases wind erosion, which changes the way that the playa absorbs rain in the future.

=== Gentrification ===
Burning Man has attracted a number of billionaires and celebrities, many of them from Silicon Valley and Hollywood. It has become a networking event for them, with Tesla Motors CEO Elon Musk once stating that Burning Man "is Silicon Valley."

These billionaires have paid for more luxurious camps to be set up in recent years. Derisively nicknamed "plug-n-play" or "turnkey" camps, they in general consist of lavish RVs and luxury restroom trailers that are driven into the city and connected together to form de facto gated areas. These billionaires then fly in to the airport on private planes, are driven to their camps, served by hired help, nicknamed "sherpas", and sleep in air-conditioned beds. One venture capitalist billionaire threw a $16,500-per-head party at his camp. In 2017, Google employees shipped in a box of lobsters for a meal.

Despite allowing the rich to participate in Burning Man per the "radical inclusion" principle, many traditional attendees have spoken out against their exclusive practices. Larry Harvey wrote that they also conflict with the "radical self-reliance" and other principles, but has also said that permitting the wealthy to attend is beneficial to Burning Man. Vandalism that occurred at the White Ocean sound camp in 2016 was said to have been a "revolution" against these attendees, describing them as a "parasite class" or "rich parasites".

Meanwhile, the regular admission price has increased over the years. In addition, Nevada lawmakers have modified the state's entertainment and sales tax code to include nonprofit organizations like Burning Man that sell more than 15,000 tickets. As a result, an individual ticket, including taxes, cost $424 in 2016. Even tickets sold under Burning Man's low-income program are subject to these taxes. Including transportation, food, camp fees, clothing and costumes, and gifts, CNBC estimated in 2016 that the total cost of attending could range from $1,300 up to $20,000. In 2017, Money magazine estimated an average total cost of $2,348 to attend.

According to the racial makeup of Burning Man attendees in 2014, 87% of them identified themselves as White, 6% as Hispanic / Latino, 6% as Asian, 2% as Native American, and 1% as Black (figures rounded). (Nevada's population, per the 2022 census, is 51% White, 29% Hispanic, 11% Asian, 2% Native, 11% Black). When interviewed by The Guardian about these figures, Harvey replied, "I don't think Black folks like to camp as much as White folks... . We're not going to set racial quotas.... This has never been, imagined by us, as a utopian society."

In 2025, 75% of Burning Man participants reported having an annual household income of over $100,000, and almost 30% reported over $300,000. In 2026, 75% of the participants were white.

While there has been criticism that Burning Man has "jumped the shark," this proposition was criticized by cultural anthropologist Graham St John in 2020, who said that Burning Man was never a utopia in the first place.

=== Criticism from conservatives and religious fundamentalists ===
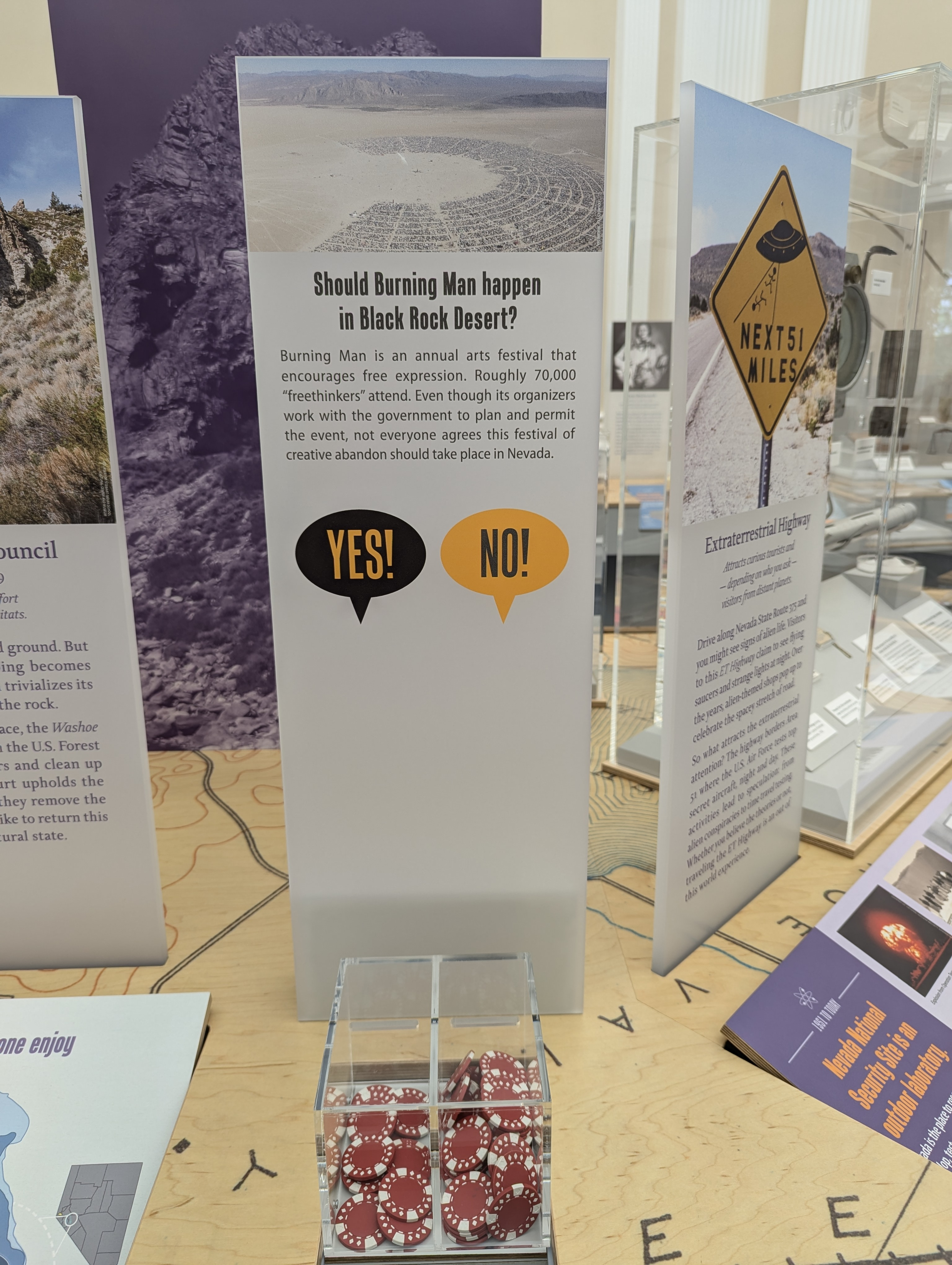
A display in the Nevada Capitol questions the existence of Burning Man.

Some conservative commentators have criticized Burning Man as sinful and hedonistic. For example, Ben Shapiro writes that Burning Man's ten principles are a "paganistic morality" which cover for hedonistic acts of sex and drug use. He holds the event as an example of "countercultural garbage that eats at the roots of fundamental societal institutions" in America. Similarly, James Goll and Lou Engle write that Burning Man "exalts Satan, mocks God, and demeans Christianity" because of its nudity, open sexuality, and neo-paganism.

=== Photography restrictions ===
Video of The Man sculpture burning, 2011

The terms of the Burning Man ticket require that participants wishing to use photo and video-recording equipment share a joint copyright of their images of Black Rock City with Burning Man and forbid them from using their images for commercial purposes. This has been criticized by many, including the Electronic Frontier Foundation (EFF). The amount of casual nudity at the event has significantly decreased over the years, due to the rise of ubiquitous cell phone cameras and the ability to easily upload photos to the Internet.

A Burning Man spokeswoman replied that the policies are not new, were written by a former head of the EFF, were used when suing to block pornographic videos, and ultimately arose from participant concerns: "We're proud that Black Rock City (a private event held on public land) is widely acknowledged as a bastion of creative freedom. [B]ut that protection [of participants' freedoms] does necessitate the acceptance of some general terms of engagement when it comes to cameras.... EFF seems to think that anyone attending any event somehow has an absolute right to take photographs, and then to do whatever they want with those images without any effective restriction or manner of enforcement. While we believe that such rights do make sense for any of us taking pictures in purely public spaces, this is not true in the private space of Burning Man – if it were, it would mean that Burning Man couldn't protect participant privacy or prevent commercialization of imagery."

The Burning Man organization has since worked with the EFF and with Creative Commons and other parties and has revised and clarified the photography policies.

== Regional events ==
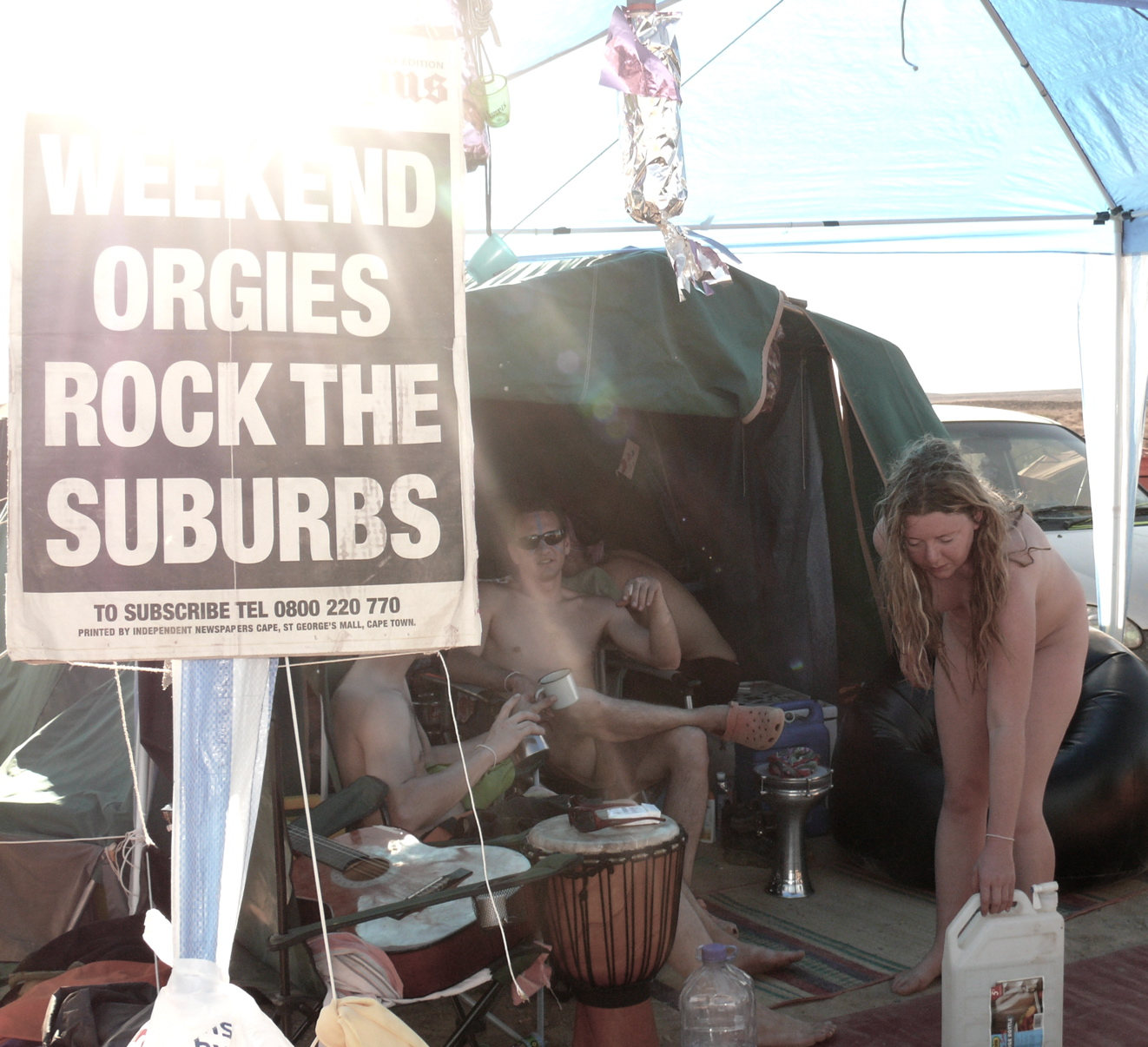
A camp at a regional burn in South Africa

Burning Man's popularity has encouraged other groups and organizations to hold similar events, some of which serve as an epilogue for participants.

Burners have created smaller regional events modeled on Burning Man, such as Burning Flipside in Texas; Apogaea in Colorado; Playa del Fuego in Delaware; Firefly in New England; Kiwiburn in New Zealand; Blazing Swan in Australia; Transformus in West Virginia; AfrikaBurn in South Africa; NoWhere near Zaragoza in Spain; Midburn in Israel; and many others.

Some of the events are officially affiliated with the Burning Man organization via the Burning Man Regional Network. This official affiliation usually requires the event to conform to the 10 principles and certain standards outlined by the Burning Man organization and to be accompanied by a "Burning Man Regional Contact," a volunteer with an official relationship to the Burning Man Project via a legal Letter of Agreement. In exchange for conforming to these standards, the event is granted permission to officially communicate itself as a Burning Man Regional Event. The regional event organizers are enabled to exchange best practices with each other on a global level via online platforms and in-person conferences, which are partly sponsored by the Burning Man Project.

== In popular culture ==
- The Simpsons 2014 episode "Blazed and Confused" features "Blazing Guy", an event based on Burning Man, with one character even referencing "Burning Man" before correcting herself to "Blazing Guy".
- The first Google Doodle, a playful adaptation of the Google logo, announced the founders' attendance at Burning Man in 1998.
- The plot of the 2005 Malcolm in the Middle episode "Burning Man" takes place during the event.
- In Zootopia 2, part of the plot takes place at the parody festival "Burning Mammal".
- The 2007 Xavier: Renegade Angel episode "Escape from Squatopian Freedom" features protagonist Xavier going to an event known as "Burning Person".
- The 2016 video game Watch Dogs 2 features the characters visiting a Burning Man-themed event.

== Gallery ==
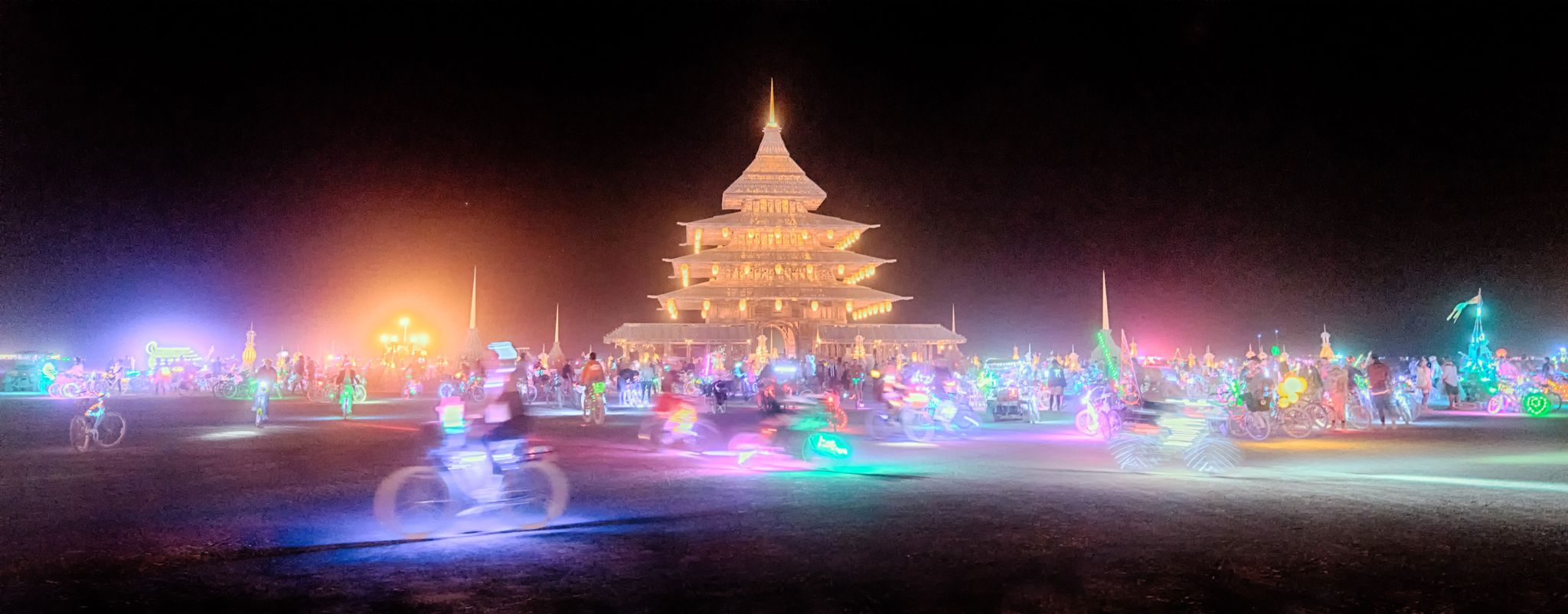
Temple 2016

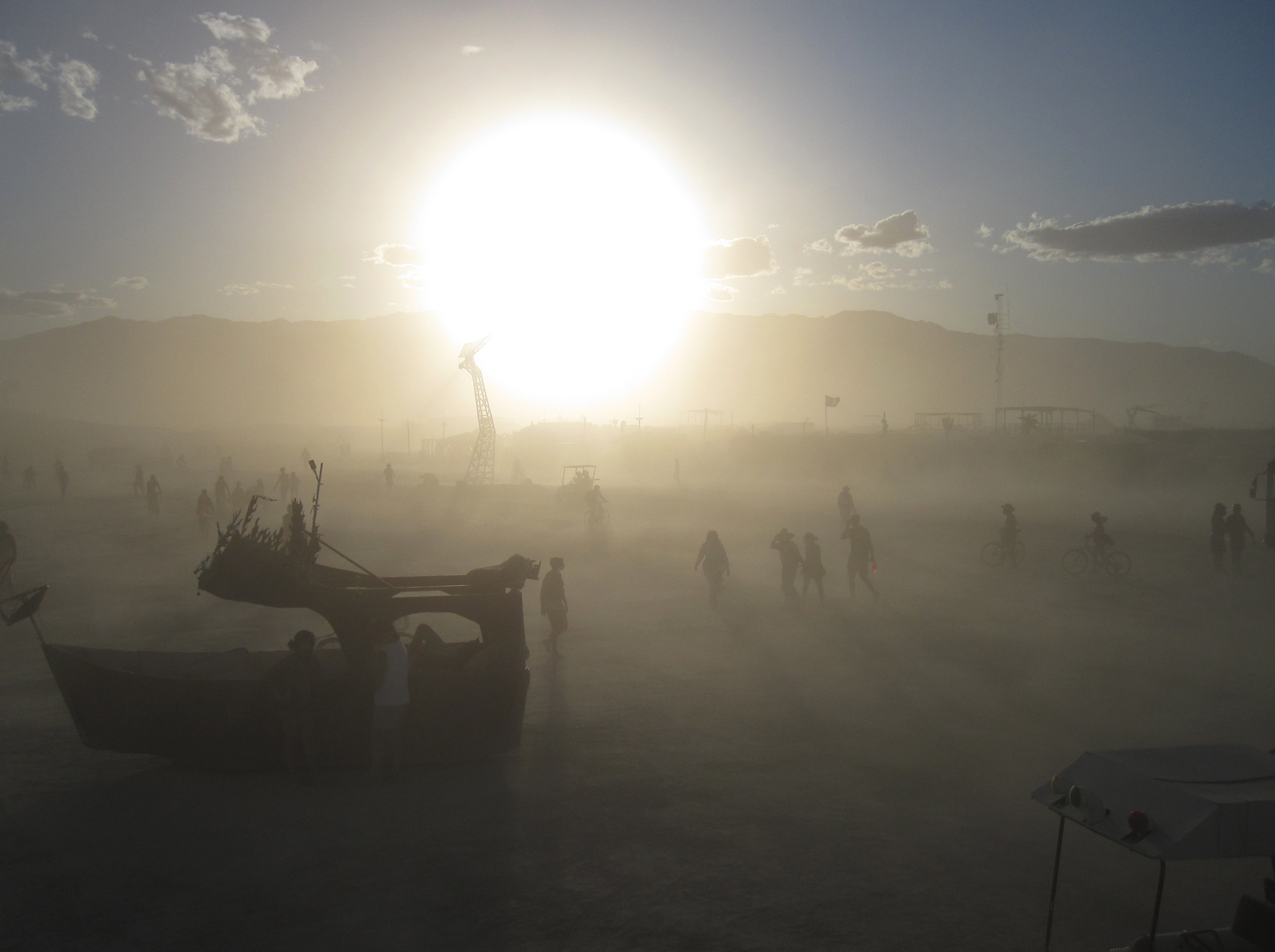
Dust storm Desert

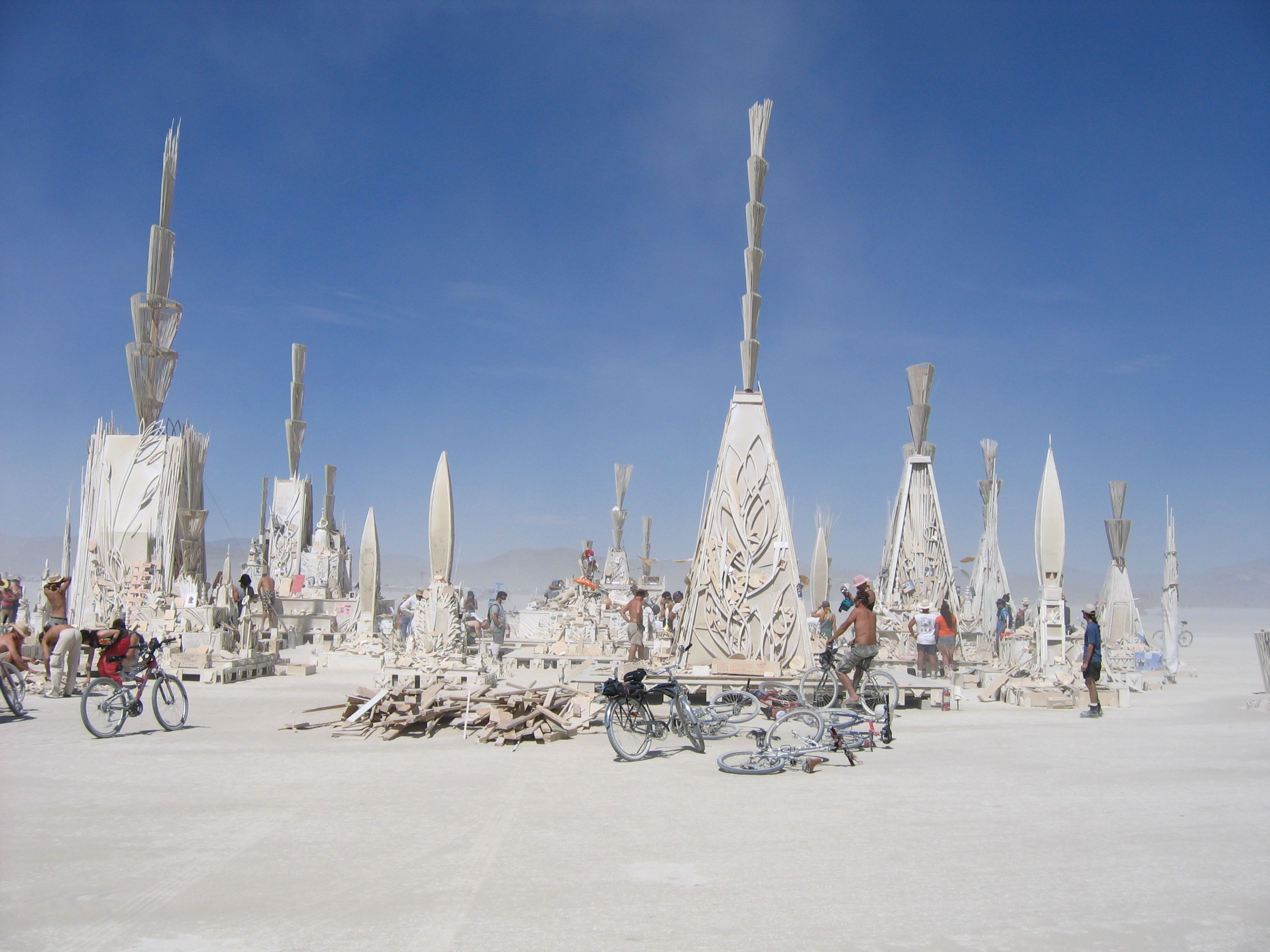
Temple 2006

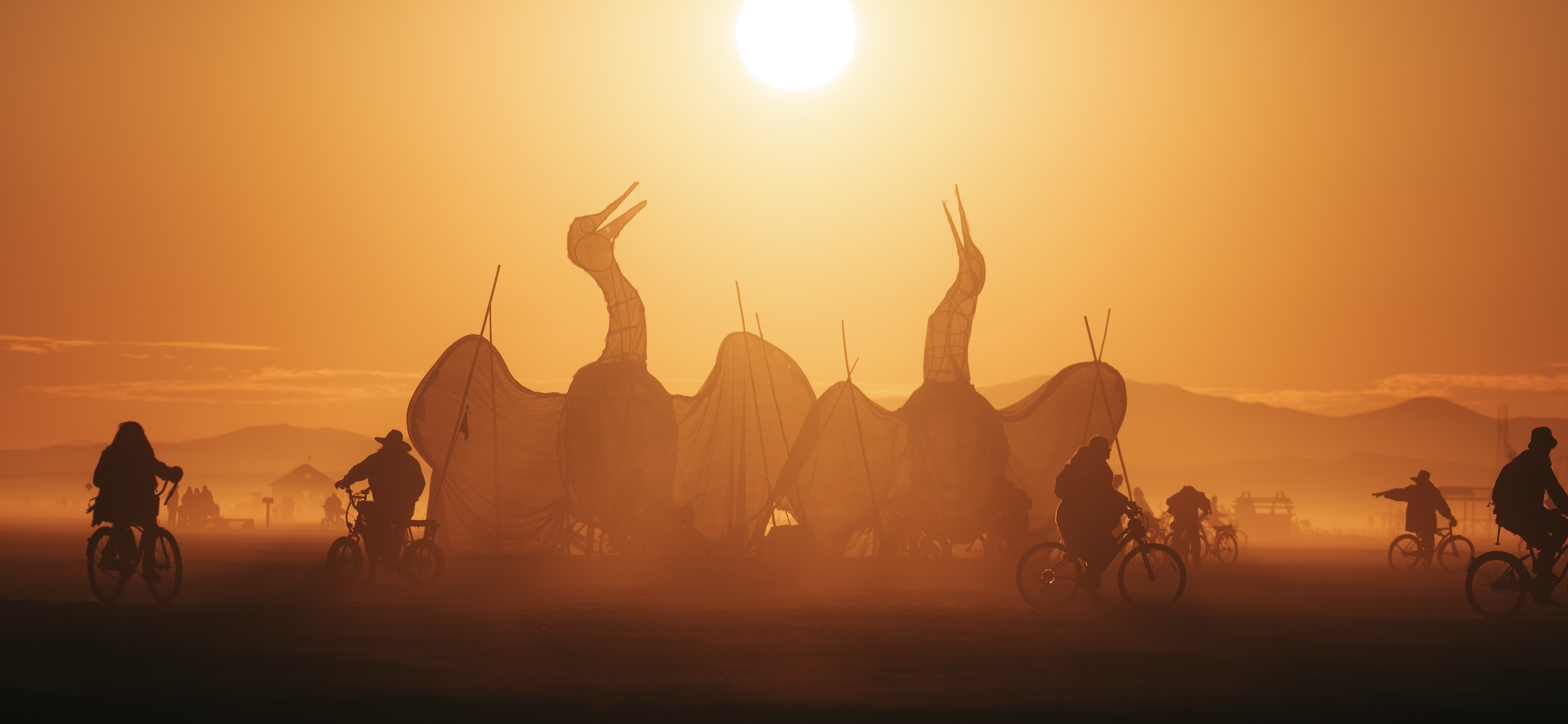
BURNING MAN 2025

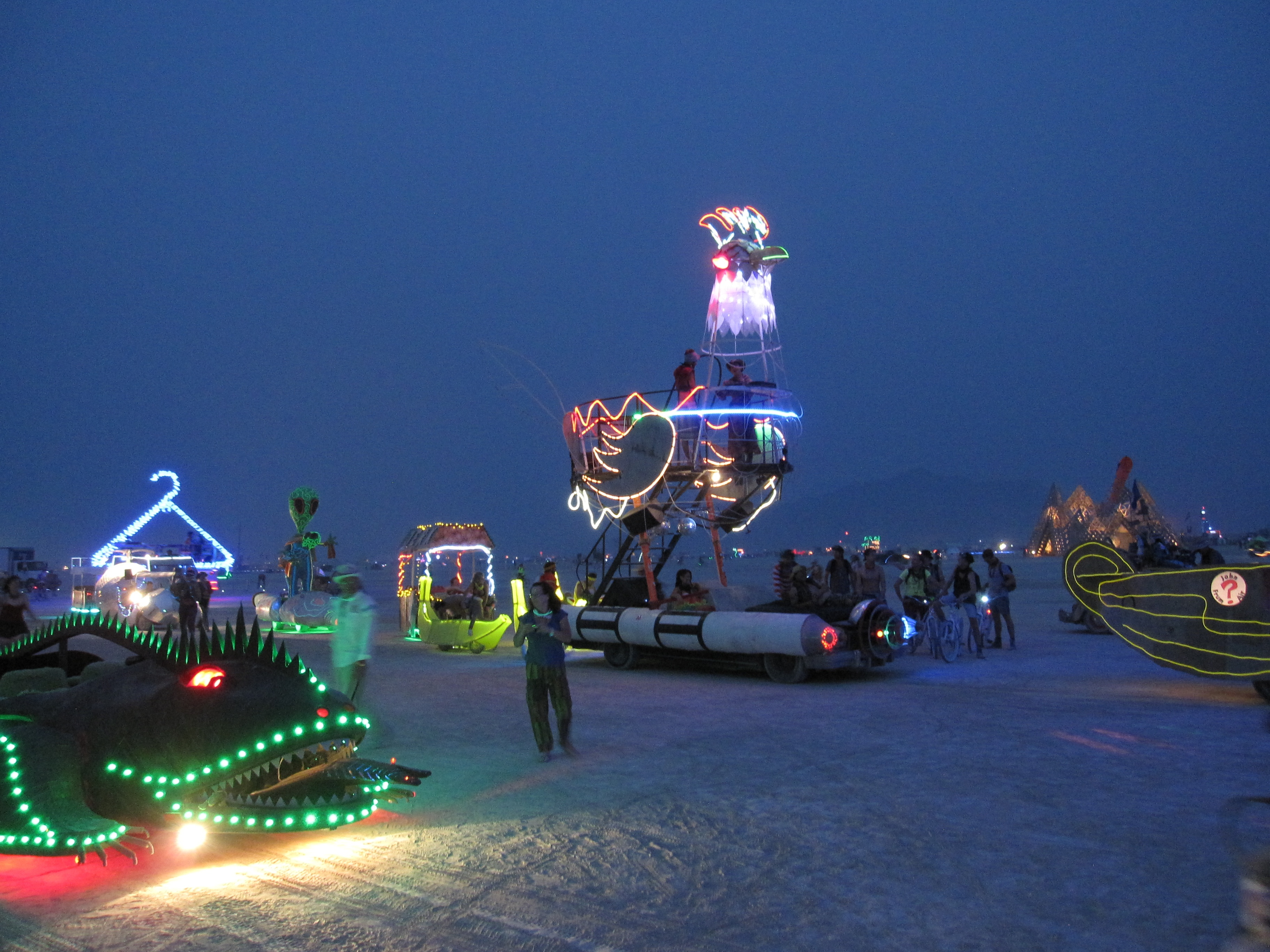
Burning Man 2013

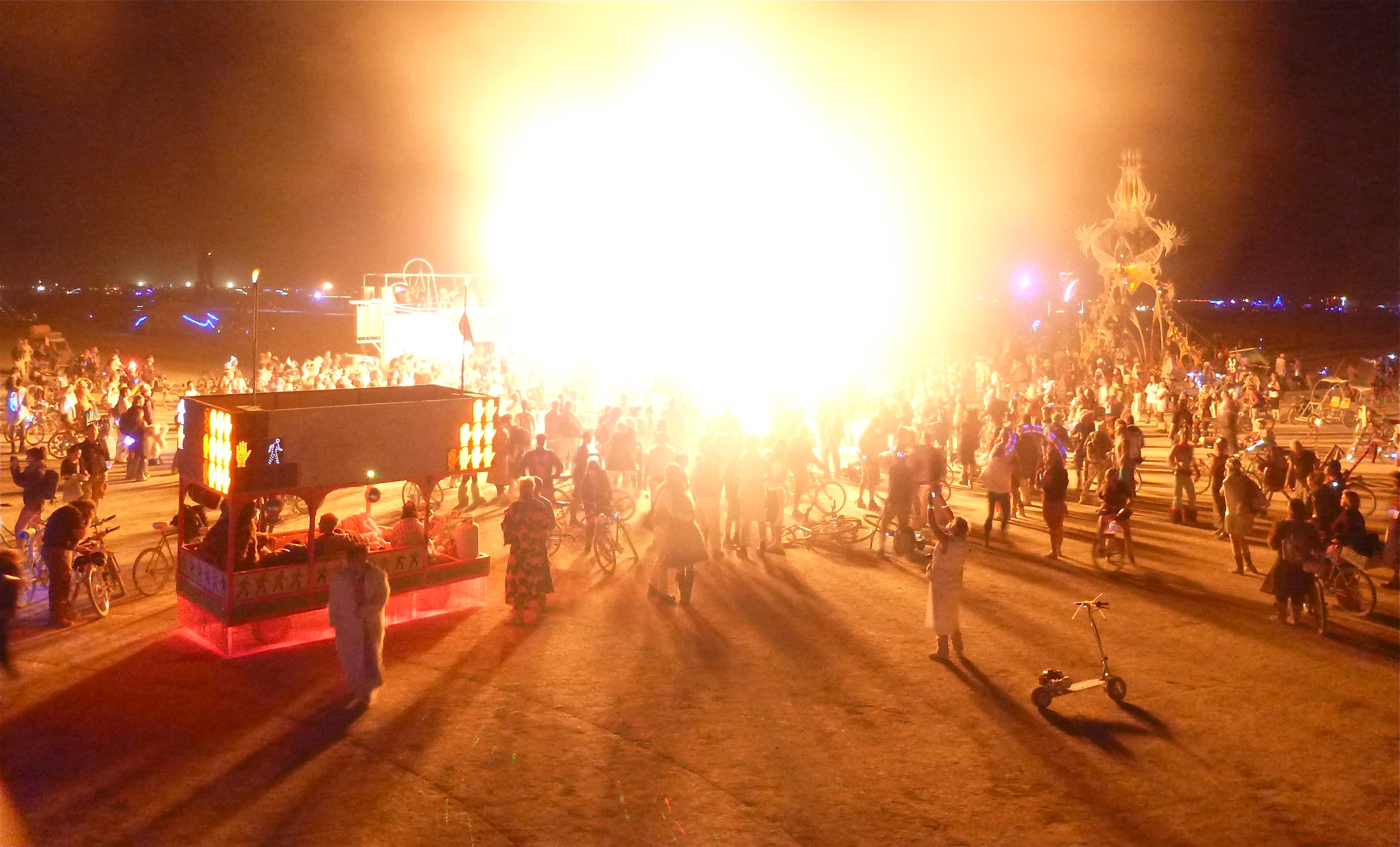
Worship the Sun

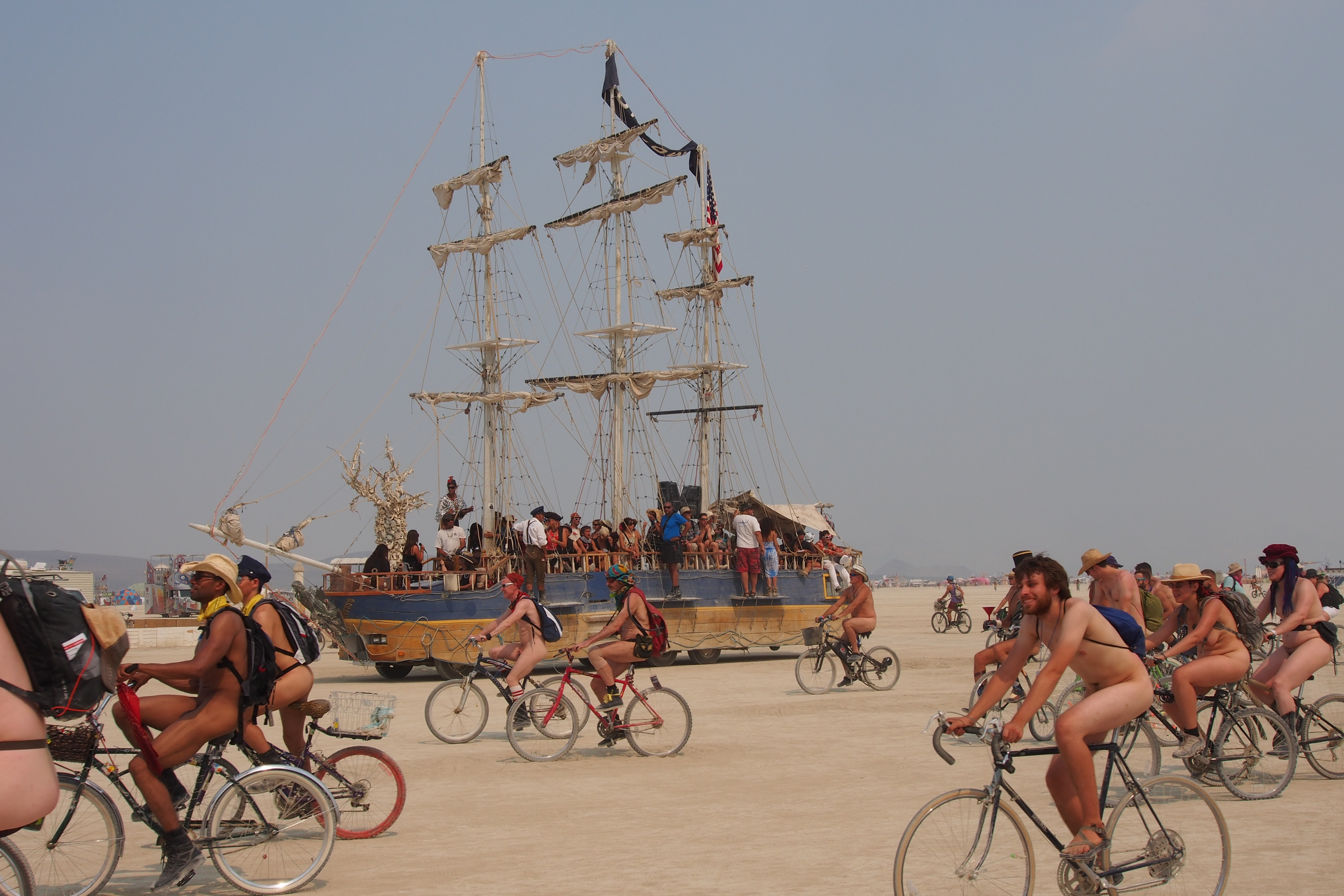
Burning Man 2013

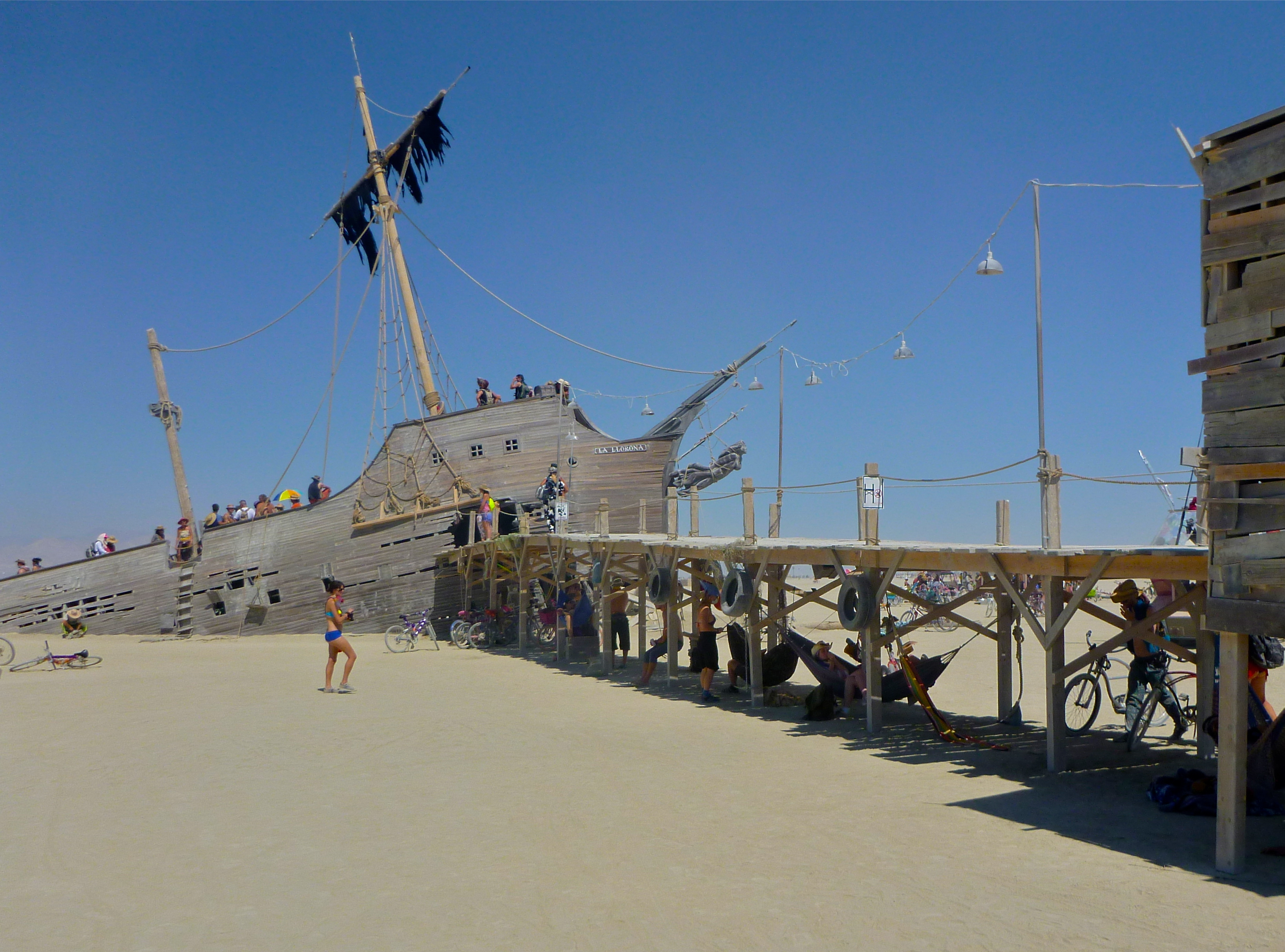
Burning Man Pirate's Booty

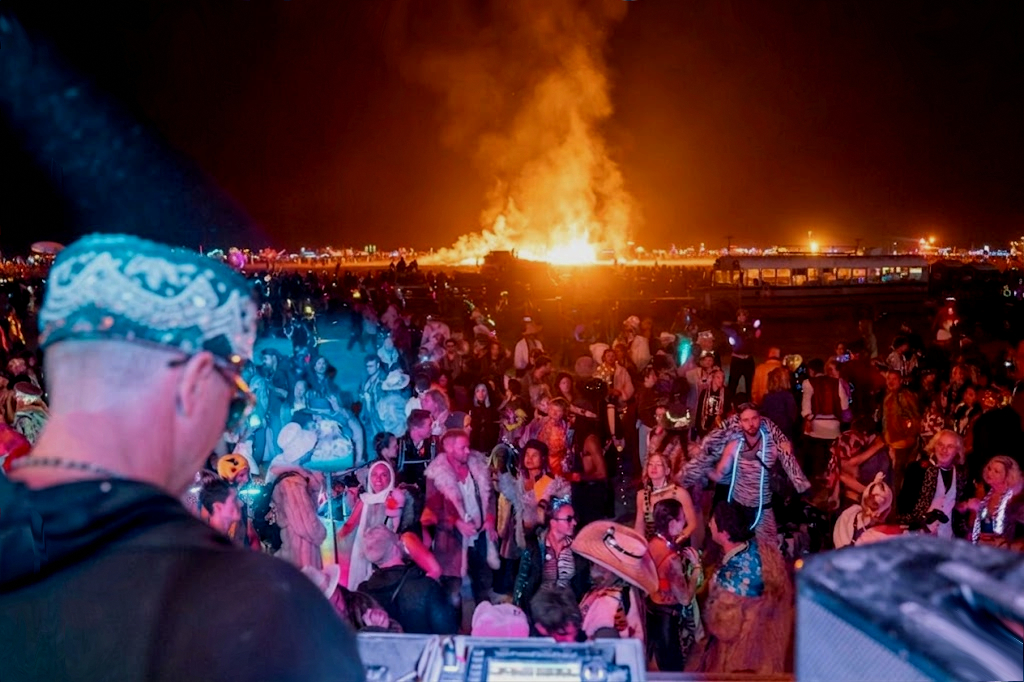
Burning Man - DJ Michel v. Tell

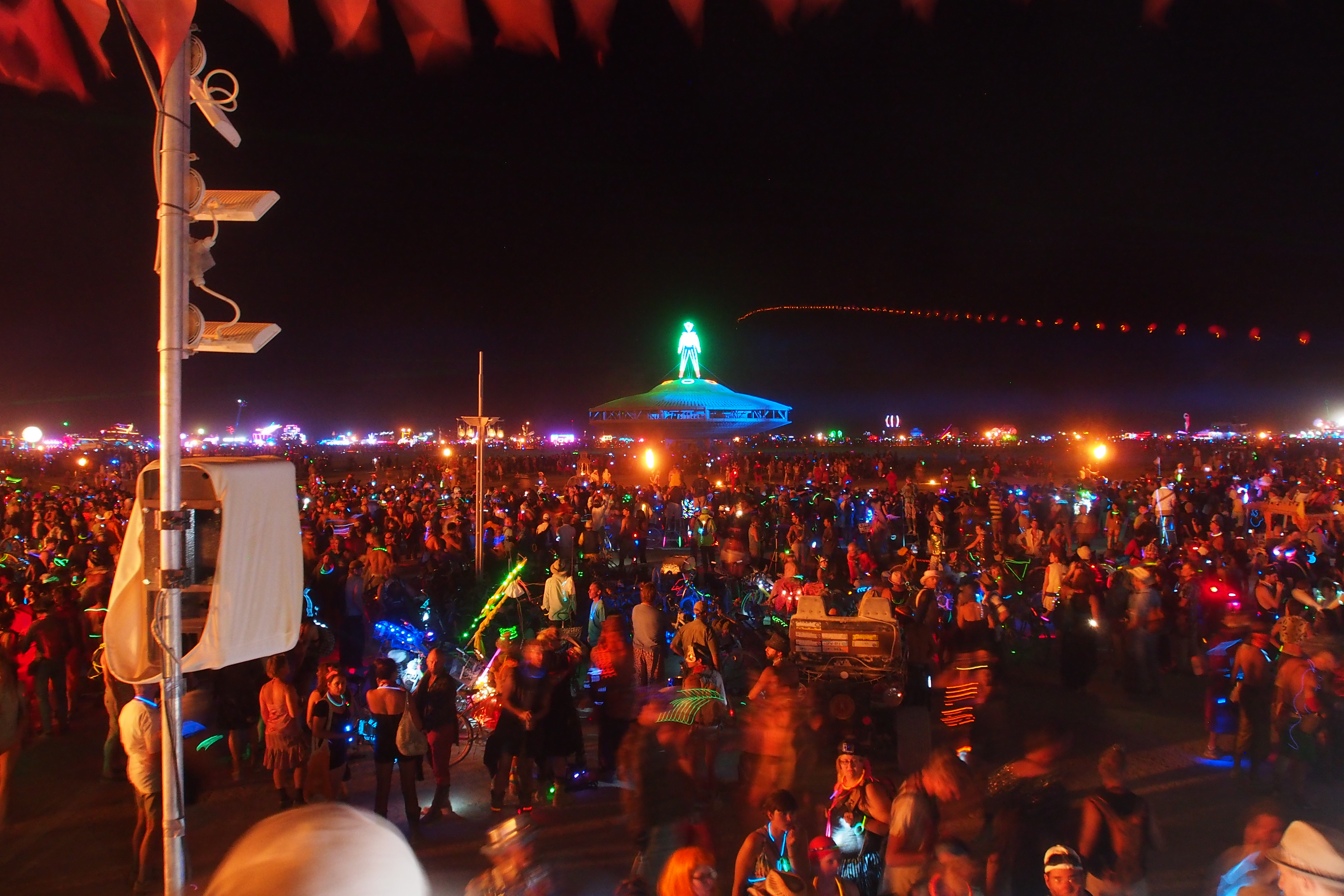
Burning Man 2013

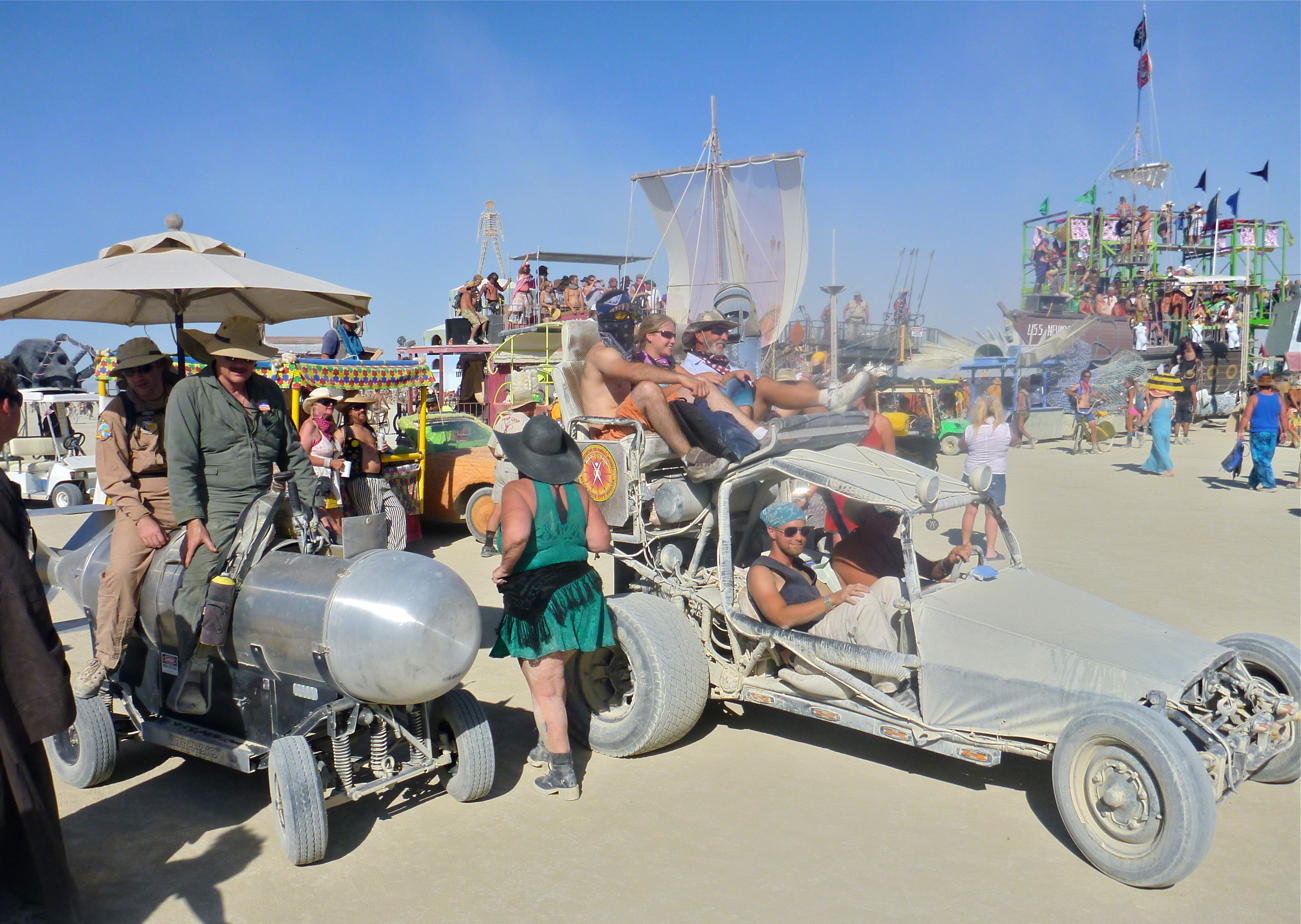

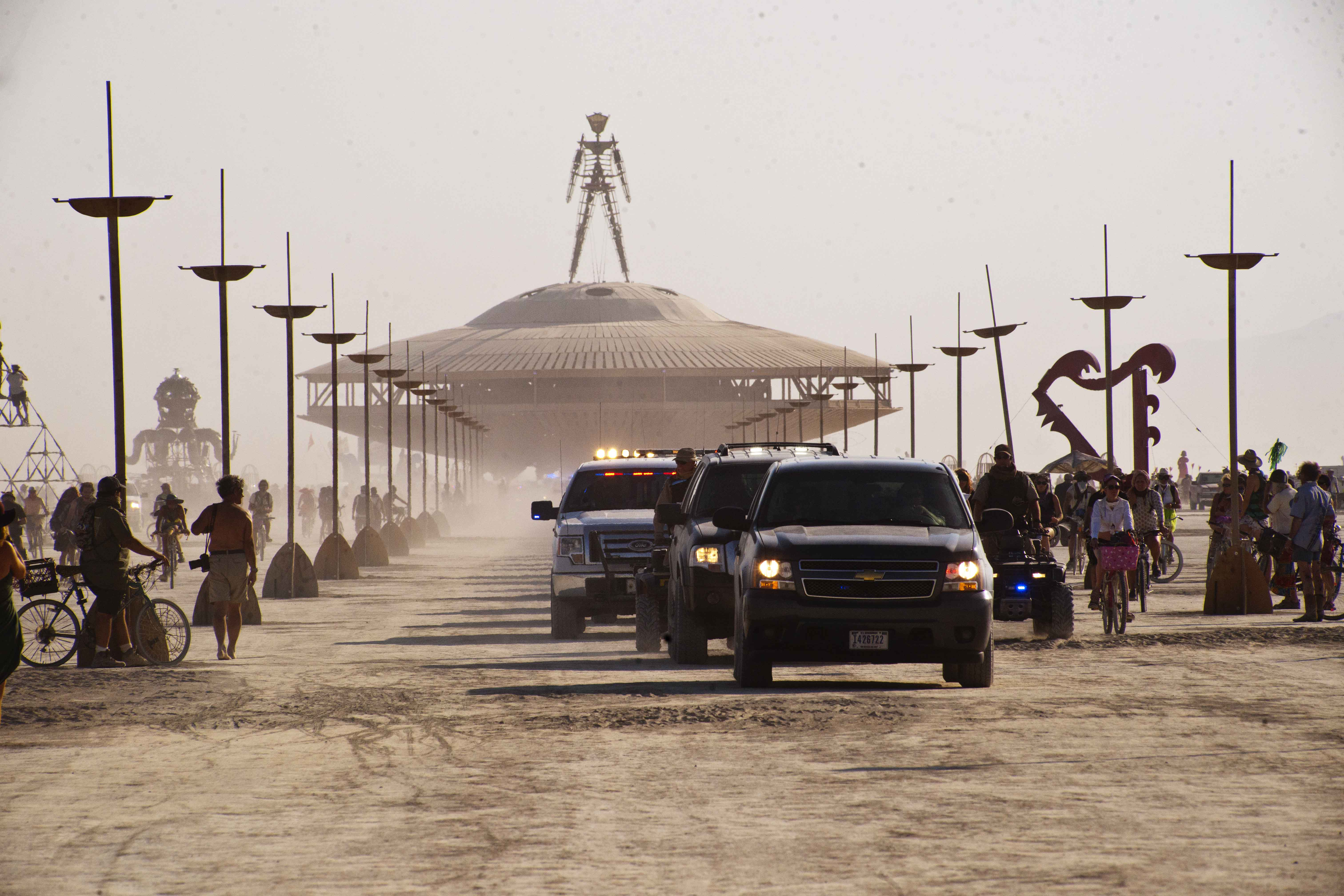
Burning Man 2013

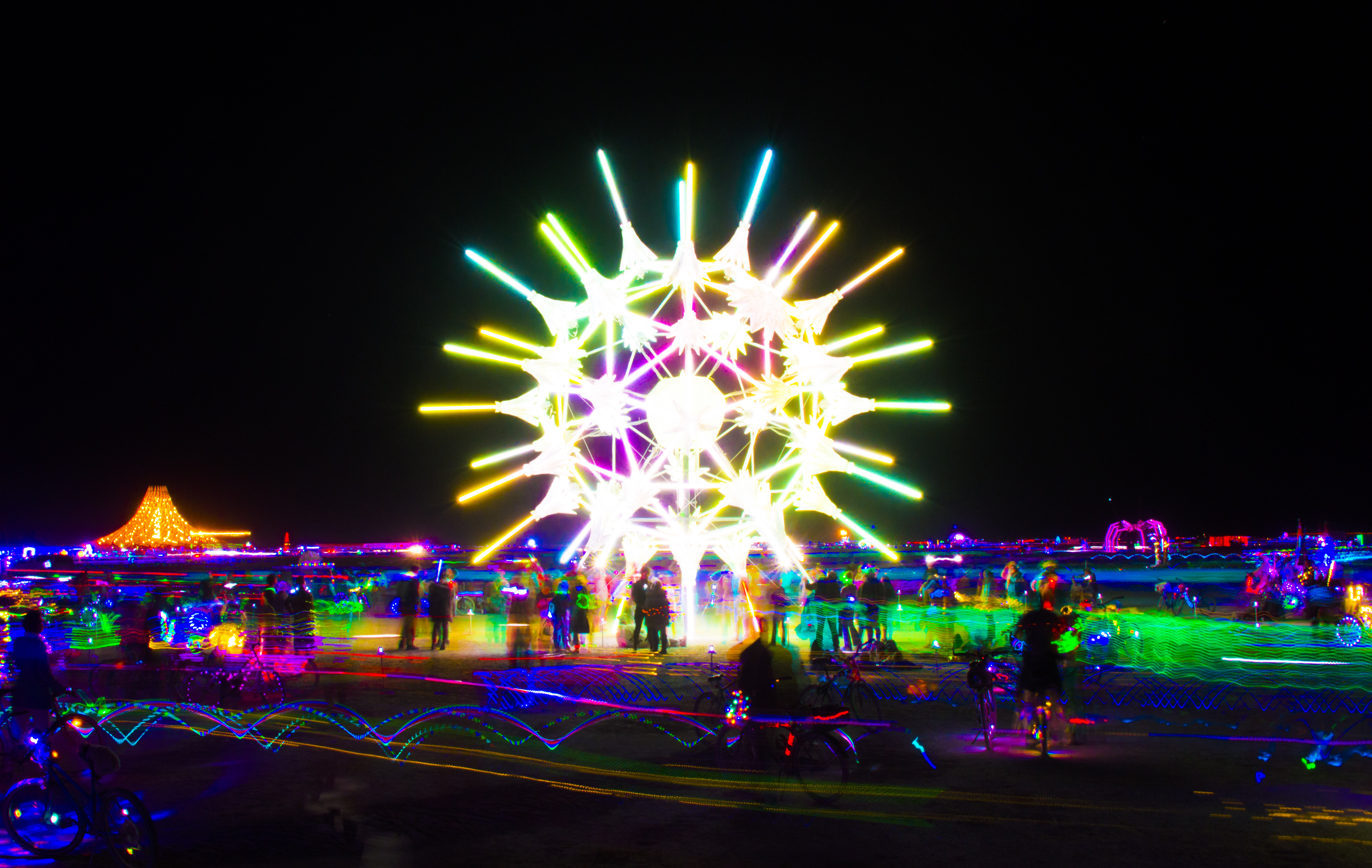
2018 Burning Man

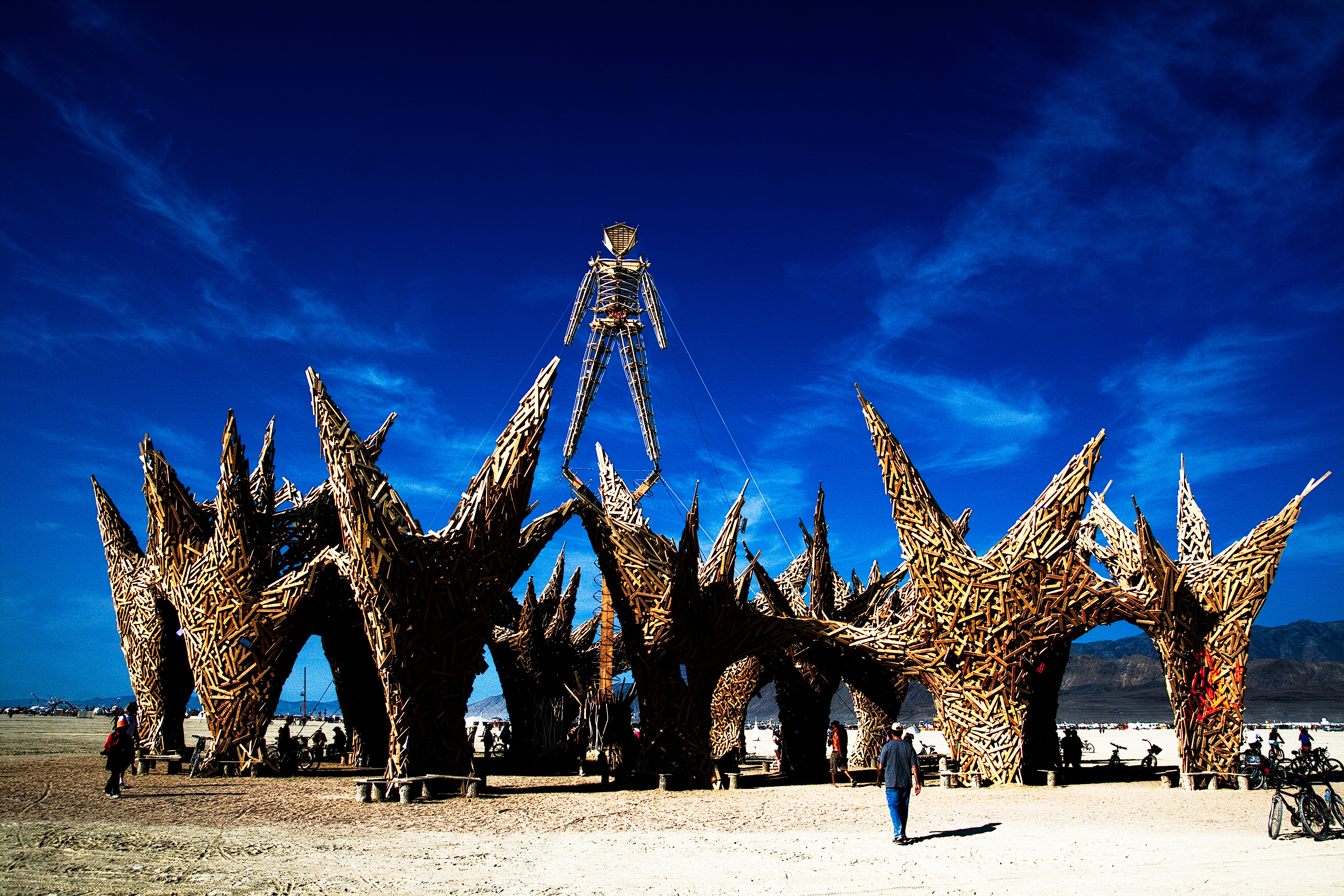

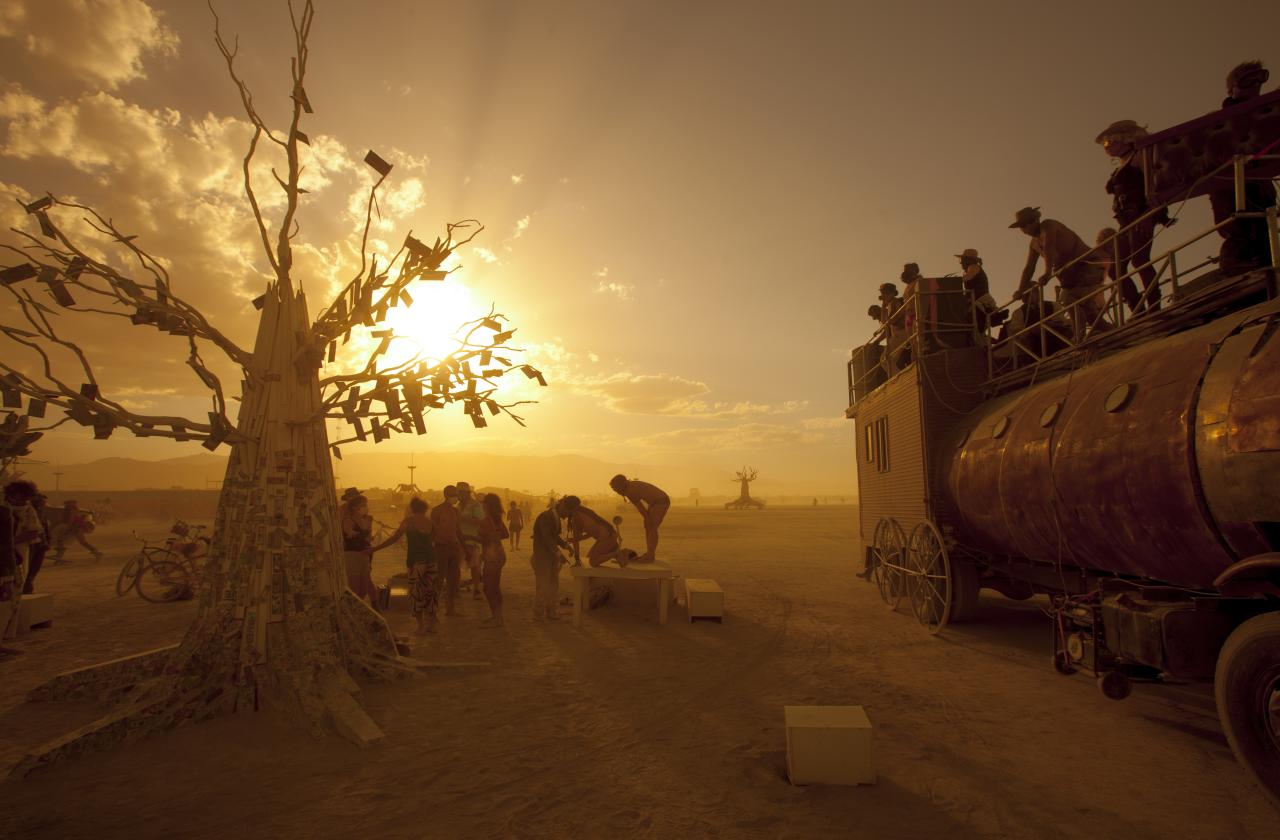
Burning man 2012

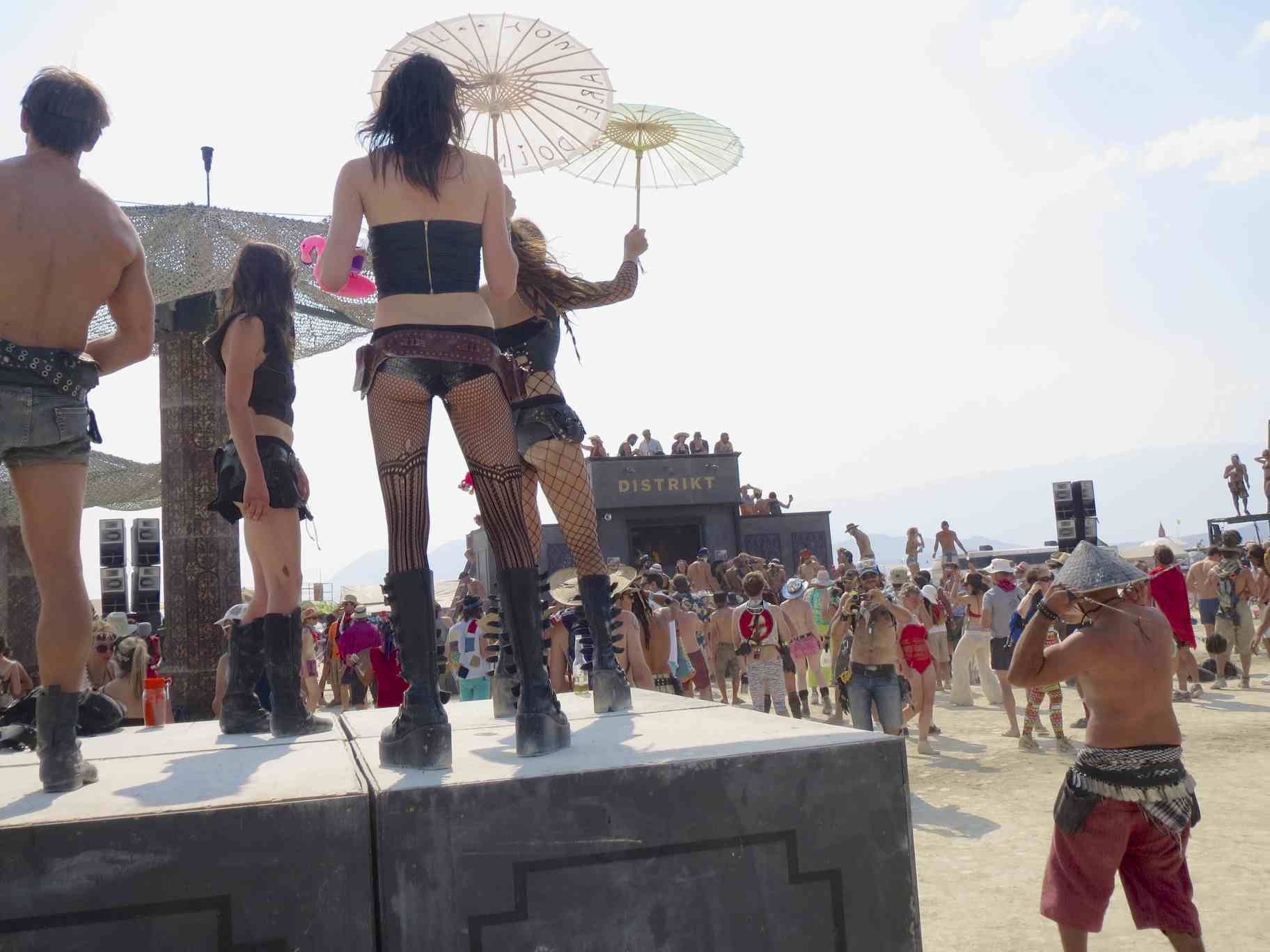
Burning Man 2013

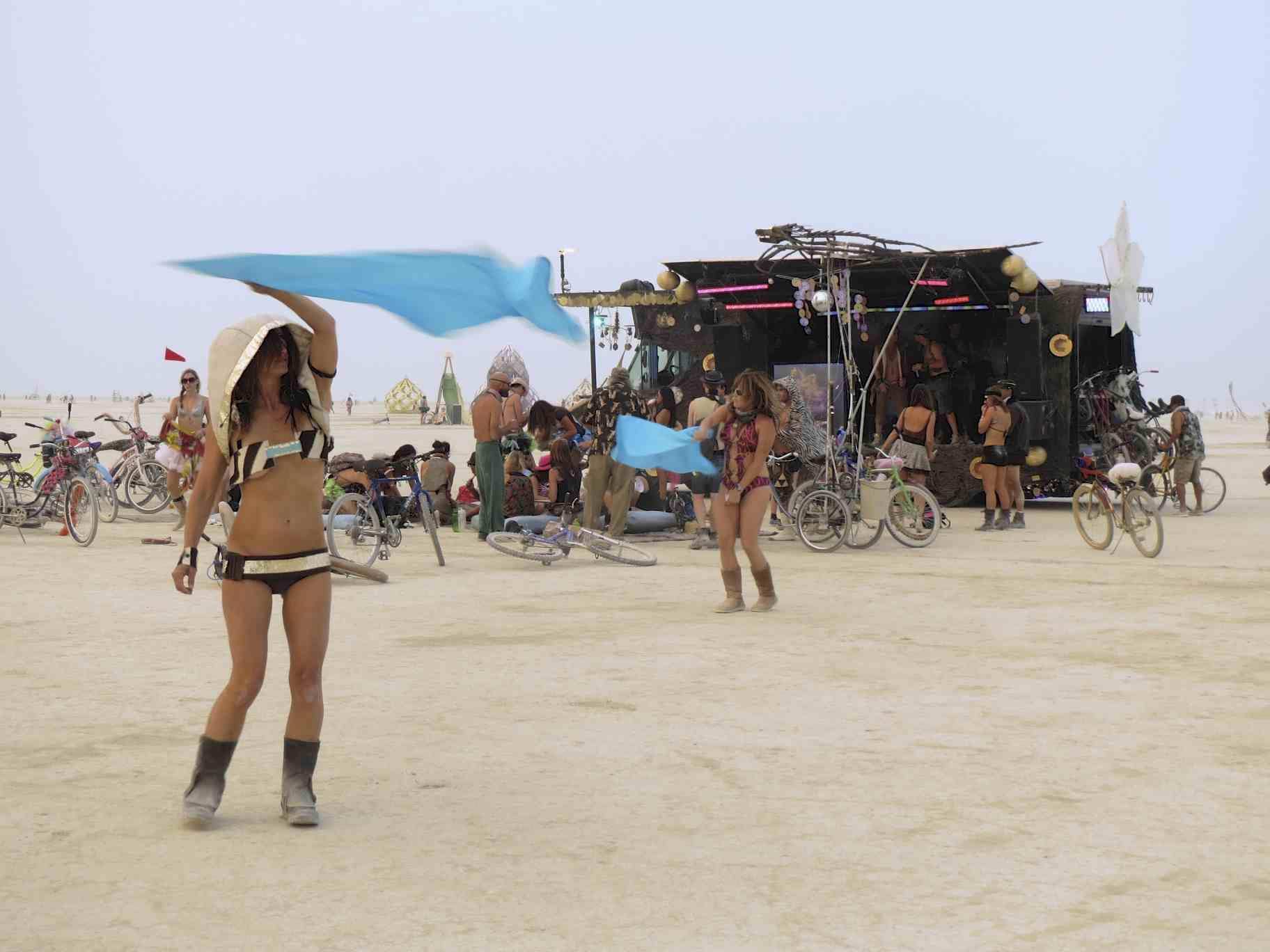
Burning Man 2013

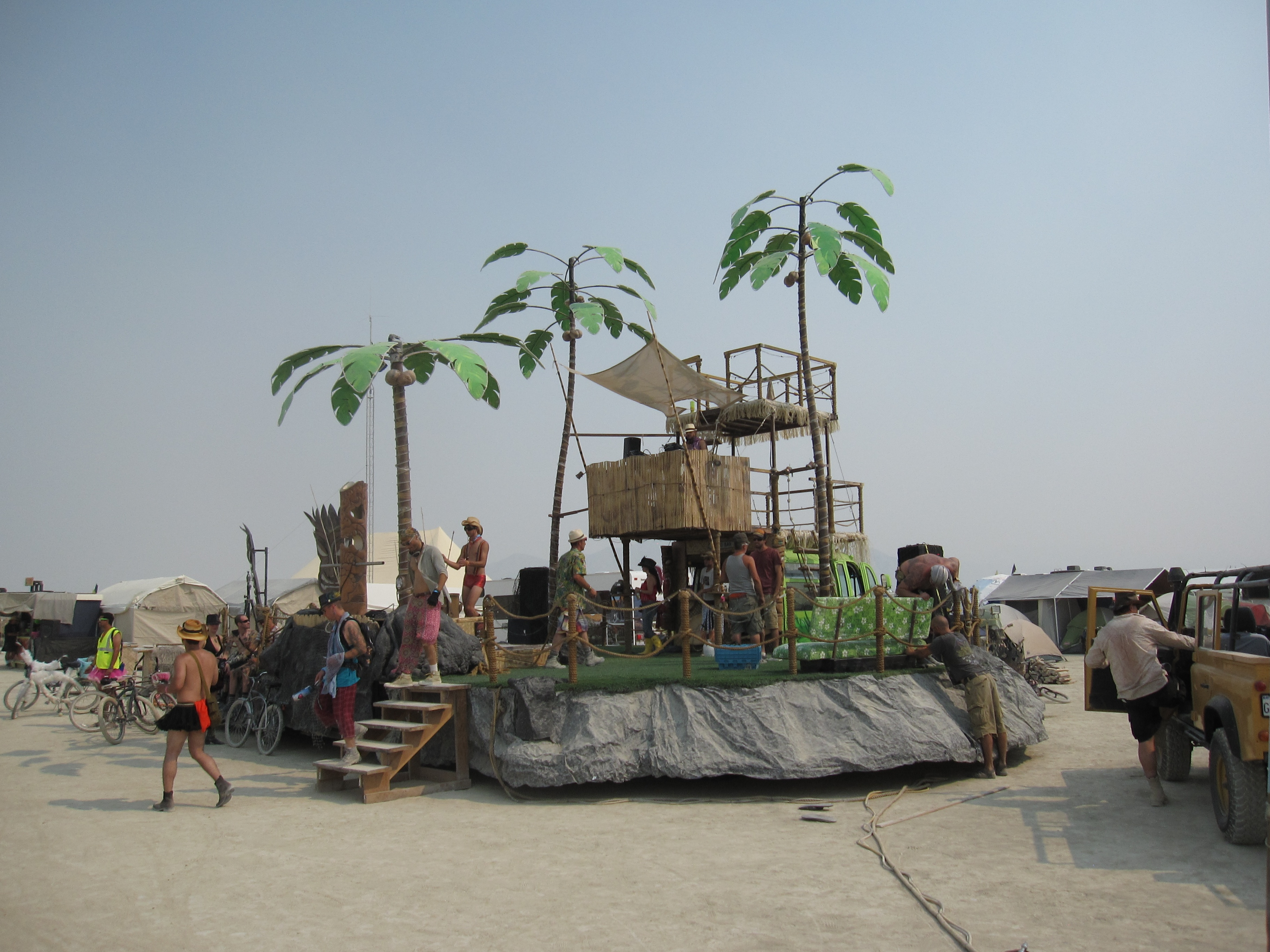
Island on the move 2013

== Films ==
- Dust & Illusions, a 2009 documentary about 30 years of Burning Man history from the perspective of 20 interviewees.
- Taking My Parents to Burning Man, a 2014 film documenting the adventures and misadventures as Bryant Boesen takes his parents on their first Burn.
- Spark: A Burning Man Story, a 2013 documentary about Burning Man, which includes behind-the-scenes footage and interviews with the founders.

== See also ==
=== Festival gatherings ===
- Böögg
- Holika Dahan
- Lohri
- Rainbow Gathering
- Robodonien
- Rubber Tramp Rendezvous
- Saint John's Eve
- Vijayadashami
- Zozobra

=== Music festivals ===
- Boom Festival
- Boomtown
- Creamfields
- Fusion Festival
- Glastonbury Festival
- Mysteryland
- Ozora Festival
- Psy-Fi
- Tomorrowland (festival)
- Transformational festival

=== Yoga festivals ===
- Bhakti Fest
- Wanderlust Festival

=== Places ===
- Arcosanti
- Auroville
- Temporary Autonomous Zone

=== Others ===
- Wicker man
- Folk festivals in the United States
- Hexayurt
