= Hexayurt =

Yurt-shaped shelter design

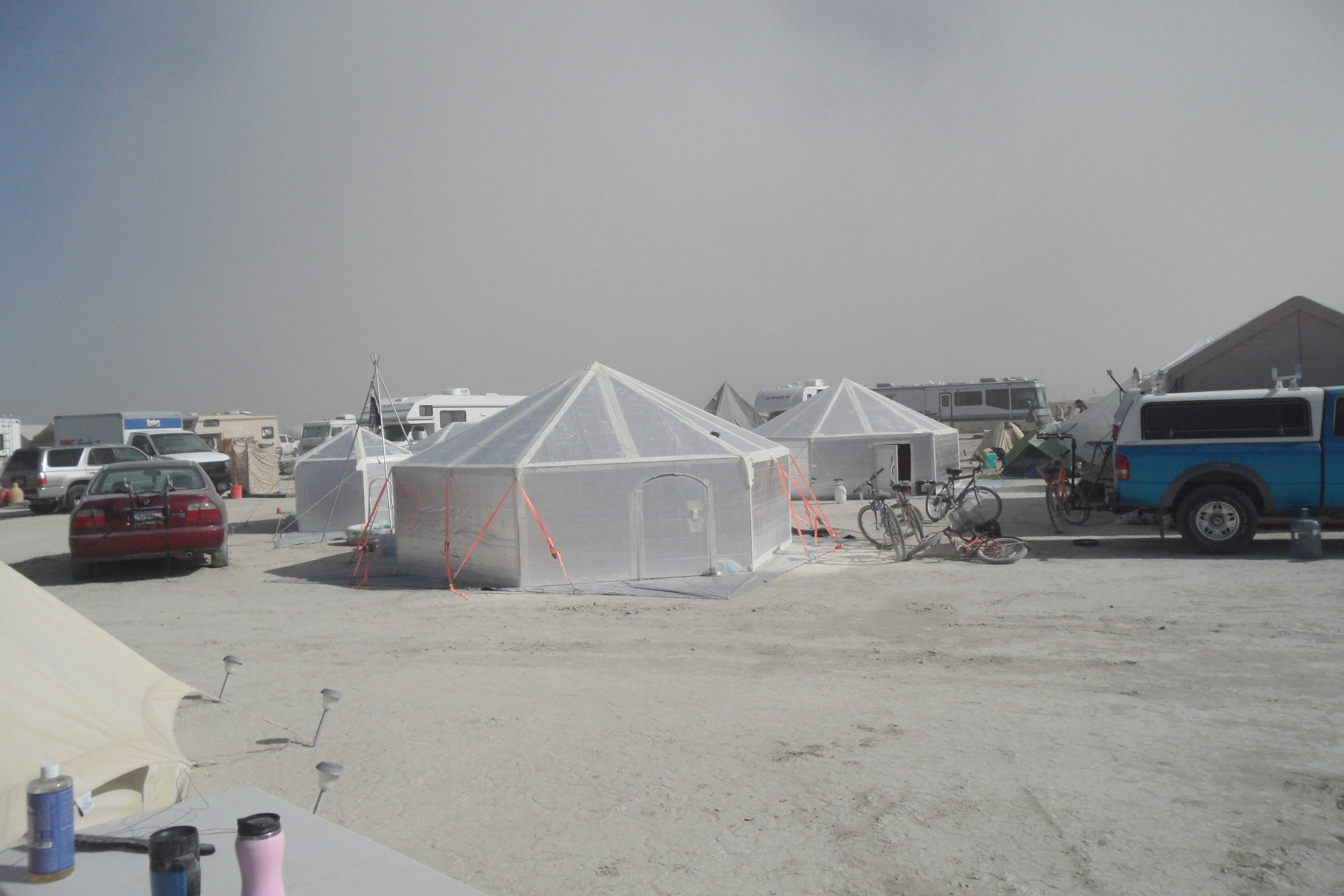
Hexayurts at Burning Man

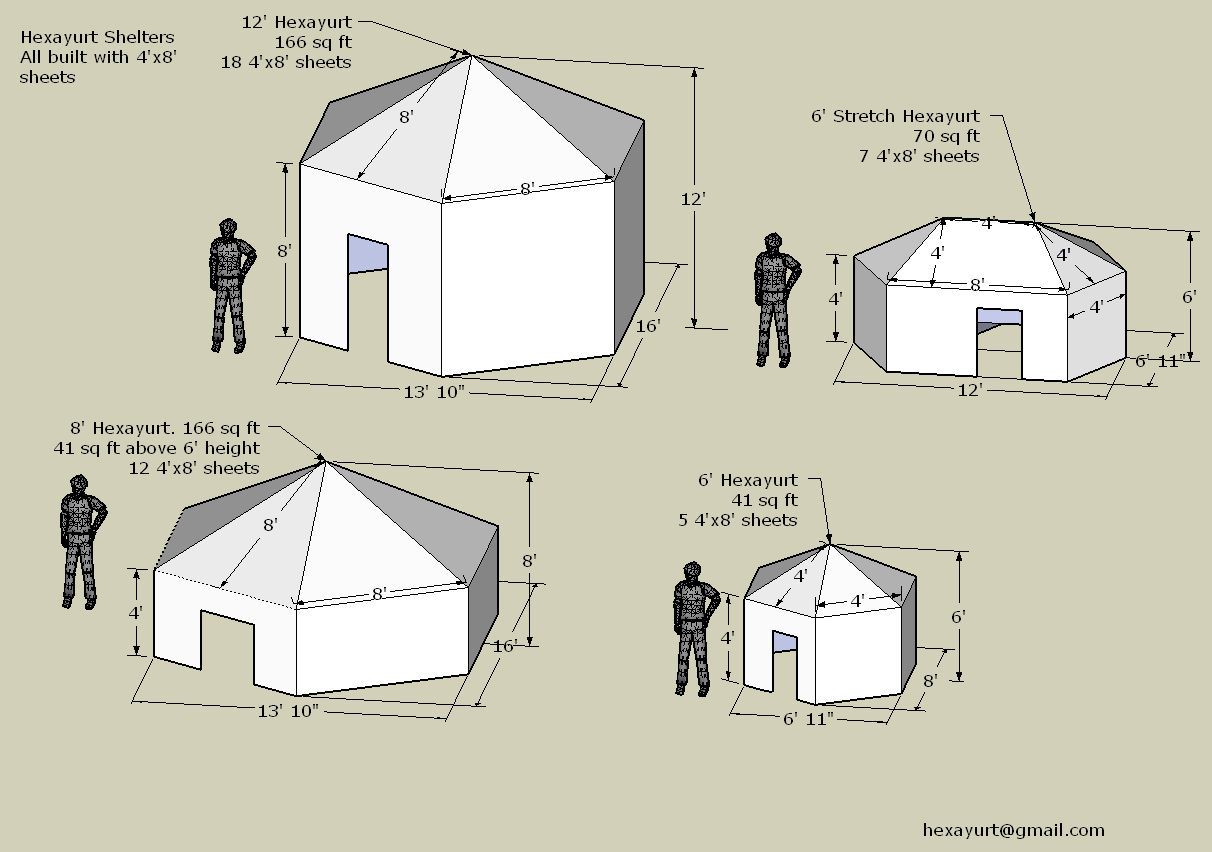
Varying sizes of hexayurts

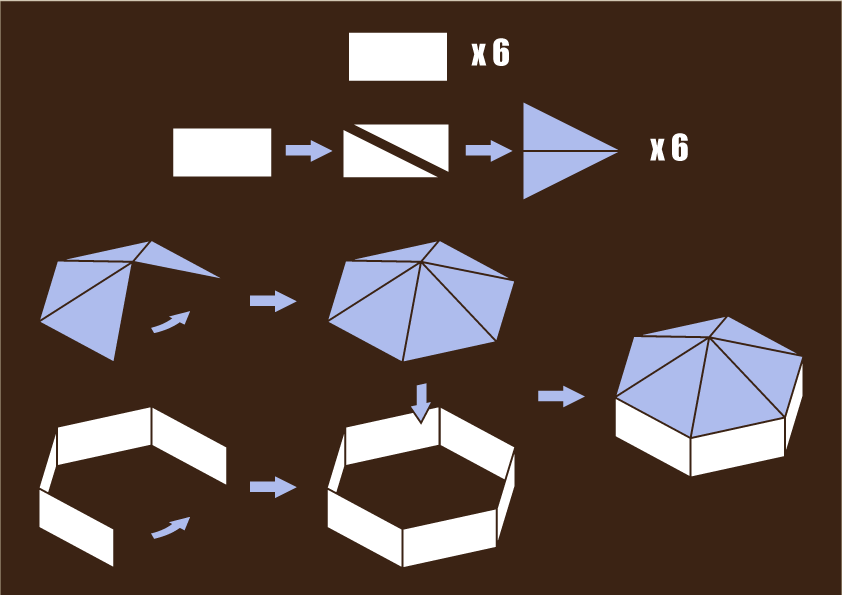
A general construction diagram

A hexayurt is a simplified disaster relief shelter design. It is based on a hexagonal geodesic geometry adapted to construction from standard 4×8 foot sheets of factory-made construction material, built as a yurt and prioritizing wasting as little material as possible. It was invented in 2002 by Vinay Gupta. Hexayurts are common at Burning Man.

== See also ==
- Yurt
