= National Register of Historic Places listings in Humboldt County, Nevada =

Contents: List of Registered Historic Places in Humboldt County, Nevada, USA:

The locations of National Register properties and districts (at least for all showing latitude and longitude coordinates below), may be seen in an online map by clicking on "Map of all coordinates".

This National Park Service list is complete through NPS recent listings posted May 8, 2026.

Contents: Counties in Nevada / See also: Nevada state-wide list
- Carson City
- Churchill
- Clark
- Douglas
- Elko
- Esmeralda
- Eureka
- Humboldt
- Lander
- Lincoln
- Lyon
- Mineral
- Nye
- Pershing
- Storey
- Washoe
- White Pine

== Current listings ==
	Name on the Register	Image	Date listed	Location	City or town	Description
1	Andorno Station	Andorno Station	March 30, 1995 (#95000329)	9535 U.S. Route 95, N. 41°27′28″N 117°48′02″W	Winnemucca	
2	Applegate-Lassen Trail		December 18, 1978 (#78001722)	Trail extends from Rye Patch northwest to the state line 41°11′45″N 119°16′36″W	Sulphur	
3	Downtown Winnemucca Historic District		May 11, 2026 (#100012980)	Roughly bounded by First Street on the north, Baud Street on the east, Fifth Street on the south, and Melarkey Street on the west. 40°58′25″N 117°44′06″W	Winnemucca	
4	Golconda School	Golconda School	November 14, 1991 (#91001651)	Junction of Morrison and 4th Sts. 40°57′10″N 117°29′17″W	Golconda	
5	Humboldt County Courthouse	Humboldt County Courthouse	August 19, 1983 (#83001109)	5th and Bridge Sts. 40°57′59″N 117°44′11″W	Winnemucca	
6	Humboldt River Bridge	Humboldt River Bridge	March 30, 1995 (#95000322)	N. Bridge St. over the Humboldt River; 40°58′35″N 117°44′17″W	Winnemucca	
7	Last Supper Cave		December 6, 1975 (#75001111)	Address Restricted	Denio	
8	Martin Hotel	Martin Hotel	October 24, 2003 (#03001067)	94 W. Railroad St. 40°58′15″N 117°43′50″W	Winnemucca	
9	Micca House	Micca House	June 11, 1975 (#75001112)	Bridge St. 41°29′34″N 117°31′54″W	Paradise Valley	
10	Paradise Valley Ranger Station	Paradise Valley Ranger Station	June 19, 1996 (#96000662)	355 S. Main St. in the Humboldt National Forest; 41°29′20″N 117°32′01″W	Paradise Valley	
11	W.C. Record House	W.C. Record House	August 27, 1980 (#80002467)	146 W. 2nd St. 40°58′24″N 117°44′13″W	Winnemucca	
12	Silver State Flour Mill		May 13, 1976 (#76001142)	7 miles east of Paradise Valley off State Route 8B; 41°30′44″N 117°26′19″W	Paradise Valley	
13	US Post Office-Winnemucca Main	US Post Office-Winnemucca Main	February 28, 1990 (#90000137)	90 W. 4th St. 40°58′21″N 117°44′02″W	Winnemucca	Now used as Winnemucca City Hall
14	Winnemucca Grammar School	Winnemucca Grammar School	November 14, 1991 (#91001654)	522 Lay St. 40°58′12″N 117°44′01″W	Winnemucca	
15	Winnemucca Hotel	Winnemucca Hotel	May 26, 2005 (#05000471)	95 S. Bridge St. 40°58′28″N 117°44′15″W	Winnemucca	Structure was demolished in 2019.

=== Former listing ===
	Name on the Register	Image	Date listed	Date removed	Location	City or town	Description
1	Nixon Opera House		May 18, 1983 (#83001110)	October 14, 2000	Winnemucca Blvd. and Melarkey St.	Sparks	Burned down by arsonists in 1992

== See also ==
- List of National Historic Landmarks in Nevada
- National Register of Historic Places listings in Nevada
