= National Register of Historic Places listings in Clark County, Nevada =

List of Registered Historic Places in Clark County, Nevada, USA:

The locations of National Register properties and districts (at least for all showing latitude and longitude coordinates below), may be seen in an online map by clicking on "Map of all coordinates".

This National Park Service list is complete through NPS recent listings posted May 1, 2026.

Contents: Counties in Nevada / See also: Nevada state-wide list
- Carson City
- Churchill
- Clark
- Douglas
- Elko
- Esmeralda
- Eureka
- Humboldt
- Lander
- Lincoln
- Lyon
- Mineral
- Nye
- Pershing
- Storey
- Washoe
- White Pine

== Current listings ==
	Name on the Register	Image	Date listed	Location	City or town	Description
1	B-29 Serial No. 45-21847 (Heavy Bomber)	B-29 Serial No. 45-21847 (Heavy Bomber)	April 20, 2011 (#11000212)	Lake Mead National Recreation Area	Overton	The wreckage of a scientific mission under Lake Mead
2	Berkley Square	Berkley Square	October 23, 2009 (#09000846)	Area bounded by Byrnes Ave., D St., Leonard Ave., and G St. 36°11′26″N 115°08′57″W	Las Vegas	an African-American community built in West Las Vegas as part of segregation
3	Boulder City Historic District	Boulder City Historic District	August 19, 1983 (#83001107)	Roughly bounded by Nevada Highway, Avenue L, Date, and 5th Sts. 35°58′40″N 114°50′03″W	Boulder City	
4	Boulder Dam Hotel	Boulder Dam Hotel	July 13, 1982 (#82003210)	1305 Arizona St. 35°58′45″N 114°49′48″W	Boulder City	
5	Boulder Dam Park Museum	Boulder Dam Park Museum	February 22, 1996 (#96000126)	Western side of State Route 169; 36°31′53″N 114°26′24″W	Overton	Now the Lost City Museum
6	Brownstone Canyon Archeological District	Brownstone Canyon Archeological District	September 22, 1982 (#82003212)	West of Las Vegas; 36°11′01″N 115°25′28″W	Las Vegas	
7	Camp Lee Canyon	Camp Lee Canyon	January 16, 1997 (#96001561)	State Route 156 approximately 50 miles northwest of Las Vegas in the Spring Mountains National Recreation Area; 36°18′32″N 115°40′22″W	Las Vegas	
8	Leroy and Carrie Christensen House	Leroy and Carrie Christensen House	February 9, 2024 (#100009944)	500 W. Van Buren Street; 36°11′13″N 115°08′55″W	Las Vegas	
9	Clark Avenue Railroad Underpass	Clark Avenue Railroad Underpass	January 28, 2004 (#03001509)	Junction of Bonanza Rd. and Union Pacific railroad line 36°10′38″N 115°08′40″W	Las Vegas	Also known as the Bonanza Underpass
10	Corn Creek Campsite	Corn Creek Campsite	March 4, 1975 (#75001105)	Address Restricted	Las Vegas	
11	Desert Valley Museum	Desert Valley Museum	October 24, 1991 (#91001527)	31 W. Mesquite Boulevard; 36°48′15″N 114°04′05″W	Mesquite	Now the Virgin Valley Heritage Museum
12	El Cortez Hotel and Casino	El Cortez Hotel and Casino	February 22, 2013 (#13000010)	600 East Fremont Street; 36°10′10″N 115°08′19″W	Las Vegas	
13	Eureka Locomotive	Eureka Locomotive	January 12, 1995 (#94001575)	Address Restricted; 36°13′40″N 115°12′29″W	Las Vegas	
14	Gold Strike Canyon-Sugarloaf Mountain Traditional Cultural Property	Gold Strike Canyon-Sugarloaf Mountain Traditional Cultural Property	September 4, 2004 (#04000935)	Address Restricted	Boulder City	
15	Goodsprings Schoolhouse	Goodsprings Schoolhouse	March 10, 1992 (#92000121)	San Pedro Ave. east of its junction with Esmeralda St. 35°49′54″N 115°26′08″W	Goodsprings	
16	Grapevine Canyon Petroglyphs (AZ:F:14:98 ASM)	Grapevine Canyon Petroglyphs (AZ:F:14:98 ASM)	December 15, 1984 (#84000799)	Address Restricted	Laughlin	
17	Green Shack	Green Shack	June 3, 1994 (#94000552)	2504 E. Fremont; 36°09′28″N 115°06′53″W	Las Vegas	Demolished in the 2000s
18	Gypsum Cave		July 8, 2010 (#10000443)	Sunrise Mountain; 36°13′28″N 114°58′37″W	Las Vegas	
19	Harrison's Guest House	Harrison's Guest House	May 3, 2016 (#15000009)	1001 F St. 36°10′55″N 115°08′58″W	Las Vegas	
20	Hidden Forest Cabin	Hidden Forest Cabin	February 20, 1975 (#75001106)	About 20 miles north of Las Vegas on Hidden Forest Rd. 36°37′54″N 115°13′05″W	Las Vegas	
21	Homestake Mine	Homestake Mine	July 17, 1985 (#85001601)	Address Restricted	Searchlight	
22	Hoover Dam	Hoover Dam	April 8, 1981 (#81000382)	East of Las Vegas on U.S. Route 93; 36°00′58″N 114°44′12″W	Boulder City	National Historic Landmark
23	Parley Hunt House	Parley Hunt House	November 14, 1991 (#91001652)	Canal St. near its junction with Virgin St. 36°46′32″N 114°06′59″W	Bunkerville	
24	Huntridge Theater	Huntridge Theater	July 22, 1993 (#93000686)	1208 E. Charleston Boulevard; 36°09′29″N 115°08′07″W	Las Vegas	
25	Kyle Ranch	Kyle Ranch	October 6, 1975 (#75001107)	Losee St. and Carey Ave. 36°12′16″N 115°08′21″W	North Las Vegas	
26	Las Vegas Grammar School	Las Vegas Grammar School	May 20, 1988 (#88000549)	400 Las Vegas Boulevard, S. 36°09′53″N 115°08′48″W	Las Vegas	Also known as the Fifth Street School
27	Las Vegas Grammar School	Las Vegas Grammar School	April 2, 1979 (#79001460)	Washington and D Sts. 36°10′53″N 115°08′43″W	Las Vegas	Also known as Westside School
28	Las Vegas High School Academic Building, Gymnasium, and Frazier Hall	Las Vegas High School Academic Building, Gymnasium, and Frazier Hall	September 24, 1986 (#86002293)	315 S. 7th St. 36°09′55″N 115°08′20″W	Las Vegas	Boundary increase (adding Frazier Hall) approved July 22, 2021
29	Las Vegas High School Historic District	Las Vegas High School Historic District	March 3, 2022 (#100007431)	315 South 7th St., 925 East Clark Ave. 36°09′55″N 115°08′20″W	Las Vegas	A further expansion of the preceding listing.
30	Las Vegas High School Neighborhood Historic District	Las Vegas High School Neighborhood Historic District	January 30, 1991 (#90002204)	Roughly bounded by E. Bridger, S. 9th, E. Gass, and S. 6th Sts. 36°09′44″N 115°08′23″W	Las Vegas	
31	Las Vegas Mormon Fort	Las Vegas Mormon Fort	February 1, 1972 (#72000764)	900 Las Vegas Boulevard, N. 36°10′49″N 115°07′57″W	Las Vegas	There was a boundary increase on December 12, 1978 (refnum 78003379)
32	Las Vegas Springs	Las Vegas Springs	December 14, 1978 (#78001719)	Address Restricted	Las Vegas	
33	LDS Moapa Stake Office Building	LDS Moapa Stake Office Building	July 25, 2002 (#02000819)	161 W. Virginia St. 36°32′25″N 114°26′40″W	Overton	
34	Thomas Leavitt House	Thomas Leavitt House	November 14, 1991 (#91001653)	160 S. 1st W. St. 36°46′15″N 114°07′37″W	Bunkerville	
35	Little Church of the West	Little Church of the West	September 14, 1992 (#92001161)	4617 Las Vegas Boulevard, S. 36°05′10″N 115°10′19″W	Paradise	Wedding chapel on Las Vegas strip
36	LULAC Multi-Purpose Senior Center	LULAC Multi-Purpose Senior Center	October 29, 2024 (#100010949)	330 N. 13th Street; 36°10′07″N 115°07′47″W	Las Vegas	
37	Mesquite High School Gymnasium	Mesquite High School Gymnasium	March 10, 1992 (#92000119)	144 E. N. 1st St. 36°48′18″N 114°03′18″W	Mesquite	
38	Morelli House	Morelli House	June 3, 2012 (#11001086)	861 E. Bridger Ave. 36°09′55″N 115°08′16″W	Las Vegas	
39	Mormon Well Spring		December 24, 1974 (#74001143)	North of Las Vegas on Mormon Spring; 36°38′39″N 115°05′45″W	Las Vegas	
40	Moulin Rouge Hotel	Moulin Rouge Hotel	December 22, 1992 (#92001701)	900 W. Bonanza Rd. 36°10′40″N 115°09′06″W	Las Vegas	Historic non-segregated hotel which was burned after listing.
41	Old Spanish Trail – Mormon Road Historic District	Old Spanish Trail – Mormon Road Historic District	August 22, 2001 (#01000863)	From the California border to Arizona across southern Nevada, through Las Vegas; also specifically near the junction of Interstate 15 and State Route 169; 36°15′11″N 115°09′43″W	Las Vegas and Moapa	Junction address represents a boundary increase, added on March 21, 2008
42	Overton Gymnasium	Overton Gymnasium	March 10, 1992 (#92000118)	N. W. Thomas St. west of its junction with S. Anderson St. 36°32′32″N 114°26′53″W	Overton	
43	John S. Park Historic District	John S. Park Historic District	May 16, 2003 (#03000412)	Roughly bounded by Charleston Boulevard, Las Vegas Boulevard, Franklin Ave., and S. 9th St. 36°09′24″N 115°08′40″W	Las Vegas	
44	Potosi	Potosi	November 13, 1974 (#74001144)	South of Las Vegas off Interstate 15 near Potosi Pass; 35°58′00″N 115°32′37″W	Las Vegas	
45	Pueblo Grande de Nevada		October 8, 1982 (#82000612)	Southeast of Overton; 36°29′27″N 114°22′21″W	Overton	
46	Railroad Cottage Historic District	Railroad Cottage Historic District	December 22, 1987 (#87001622)	601-629 S. Casino Center; 36°09′50″N 115°08′50″W	Las Vegas	All but one cottage destroyed or moved.
47	St. Thomas Memorial Cemetery		January 20, 2005 (#04001529)	Magnasite Rd. off Moapa Valley Boulevard; 36°31′14″N 114°26′06″W	Overton	
48	Sandstone Ranch	Sandstone Ranch	April 2, 1976 (#76001141)	20 miles southwest of Las Vegas; 36°04′04″N 115°27′30″W	Las Vegas	Boundary increase approved April 25, 2019
49	Sheep Mountain Range Archeological District		December 31, 1974 (#74001145)	Address Restricted	Las Vegas	
50	Sloan Petroglyph Site	Sloan Petroglyph Site	December 19, 1978 (#78001720)	Address Restricted; 35°55′53″N 115°11′27″W	Henderson	There was a boundary increase on February 5, 2004 (refnum 02000114)
51	Jay Dayton Smith House	Jay Dayton Smith House	February 20, 1987 (#87000077)	624 S. 6th St. 36°09′40″N 115°08′39″W	Las Vegas	
52	Spirit Mountain	Spirit Mountain	September 8, 1999 (#99001083)	North of Laughlin in the Lake Mead National Recreation Area; 35°16′30″N 114°43′26″W	Laughlin	
53	Tim Springs Petroglyphs		December 16, 1974 (#74001142)	Address Restricted	Indian Springs	
54	Tule Springs Archeological Site		April 20, 1979 (#79001461)	Address Restricted	Las Vegas	
55	Tule Springs Ranch	Tule Springs Ranch	September 23, 1981 (#81000383)	9200 Tule Springs Rd. 36°19′14″N 115°16′01″W	Las Vegas	
56	U.S. Post Office and Courthouse	U.S. Post Office and Courthouse	February 10, 1983 (#83001108)	300 E. Stewart Ave. 36°10′22″N 115°08′25″W	Las Vegas	
57	Walking Box Ranch	Walking Box Ranch	January 30, 2009 (#08001392)	6333 W. State Route 164; 35°29′22″N 115°02′25″W	Searchlight	
58	Washington School	Washington School	March 10, 1992 (#92000120)	1901 N. White St. 36°11′43″N 115°07′52″W	North Las Vegas	
59	The "Welcome to Fabulous Las Vegas" Sign	The "Welcome to Fabulous Las Vegas" Sign	May 1, 2009 (#09000284)	Las Vegas Boulevard, in public right of way, approximately .5 miles (0.8 km) south of intersection with Russell Road; 36°04′55″N 115°10′22″W	Paradise	
60	Willow Beach Gauging Station	Willow Beach Gauging Station	March 21, 1986 (#86000587)	Lake Mead National Recreation Area; 35°53′17″N 114°40′57″W	Boulder City	
61	Woodlawn Cemetery	Woodlawn Cemetery	November 21, 2006 (#06001060)	1500 Las Vegas Boulevard, N. 36°11′15″N 115°07′43″W	Las Vegas	

== Former listings ==
	Name on the Register	Image	Date listed	Date removed	Location	City or town	Description
1	Las Vegas Hospital		October 13, 1987 (#87001340)	October 13, 2000	201 N. Eight St.	Las Vegas	Destroyed by fire in 1988.
2	Old Boulder City Hospital	Old Boulder City Hospital	April 1, 1982 (#82003211)	June 9, 2023	701 Park Pl. 35°58′45″N 114°49′48″W	Boulder City	
3	Steven R. Whitehead House		August 6, 1987 (#87001341)	October 13, 2000	333 N. Seventh St.	Las Vegas	Destroyed by fire in 2000.

== See also ==
- List of National Historic Landmarks in Nevada
- National Register of Historic Places listings in Nevada
