= National Register of Historic Places listings in White Pine County, Nevada =

White Pine County highlighted in Nevada

List of Registered Historic Places in White Pine County, Nevada, USA:

The locations of National Register properties and districts (at least for all showing latitude and longitude coordinates below), may be seen in an online map by clicking on "Map of all coordinates".

This National Park Service list is complete through NPS recent listings posted November 21, 2025.

Contents: Counties in Nevada / See also: Nevada state-wide list
- Carson City
- Churchill
- Clark
- Douglas
- Elko
- Esmeralda
- Eureka
- Humboldt
- Lander
- Lincoln
- Lyon
- Mineral
- Nye
- Pershing
- Storey
- Washoe
- White Pine

== Current listings ==
	Name on the Register	Image	Date listed	Location	City or town	Description
1	American Legion Hall	American Legion Hall	December 1, 1994 (#94001404)	24 Avenue J 39°24′13″N 114°46′45″W	McGill	
2	Bahsahwahbee		May 1, 2017 (#100000464)	Address restricted	Major's Place vicinity	
3	Baker Ranger Station	Baker Ranger Station	October 17, 1995 (#95001224)	Great Basin National Park; 39°00′53″N 114°07′23″W	Baker	
4	Capital Theater	Capital Theater	August 5, 1993 (#93000692)	464–468 Aultman St. 39°14′53″N 114°53′36″W	Ely	
5	Central Theater	Central Theater	August 5, 1993 (#93000691)	145 W. 15th St. 39°15′04″N 114°52′59″W	Ely	
6	Dunkahni Archeological District		October 10, 2023 (#100009411)	Address Restricted	Baker vicinity	
7	East Ely Depot	East Ely Depot	April 12, 1984 (#84002082)	11th St. 39°15′33″N 114°52′06″W	Ely	
8	Ely City Hall and Fire Station	Ely City Hall and Fire Station	February 5, 2018 (#100002071)	501 Mill St. 39°14′49″N 114°53′41″W	Ely	
9	Ely L. D. S. Stake Tabernacle	Ely L. D. S. Stake Tabernacle	July 29, 1993 (#93000685)	900 Aultman St. 39°14′56″N 114°53′16″W	Ely	
10	Fort Ruby	Fort Ruby	October 15, 1966 (#66000460)	Near Hobson on the western side of Ruby Lake; 40°04′04″N 115°31′46″W	Hobson	Site of fort for protecting Pony Express and stagecoaches.
11	Fort Schellbourne	Fort Schellbourne	February 23, 1972 (#72000768)	43 miles north of Ely off U.S. Route 93 on State Route 2; 39°47′21″N 114°41′06″W	Ely	
12	Johnson Lake Mine Historic District	Johnson Lake Mine Historic District	November 2, 1995 (#95001225)	Great Basin National Park; 38°56′32″N 114°17′44″W	Baker	
13	Lehman Orchard and Aqueduct	Lehman Orchard and Aqueduct	February 25, 1975 (#75000181)	Great Basin National Park; 39°00′22″N 114°13′05″W	Baker	
14	Lund Grade School	Lund Grade School	December 7, 2018 (#100003200)	30 W Center St. 38°51′31″N 115°00′31″W	Lund	
15	McGill Drug Store	McGill Drug Store	August 17, 1998 (#97001301)	11 4th St. 39°24′17″N 114°46′40″W	McGill	
16	Nevada Northern Railway East Ely Yards and Shops	Nevada Northern Railway East Ely Yards and Shops	July 29, 1993 (#93000693)	1100 Ave. A 39°15′36″N 114°52′07″W	Ely	
17	Nevada Northern Railway – McGill Depot	Nevada Northern Railway – McGill Depot	February 17, 2015 (#15000010)	1 Ave. K 39°24′13″N 114°46′29″W	McGill	
18	Osceola (East) Ditch	Osceola (East) Ditch	June 6, 1996 (#96000584)	Starting 0.5 miles east of Grouse Canyon and running approximately 18 miles southeast to Lehman Creek in Great Basin National Park; 39°01′48″N 114°17′26″W	Baker	
19	Rhodes Cabin	Rhodes Cabin	February 25, 1975 (#75000180)	Great Basin National Park; 39°00′20″N 114°13′09″W	Baker	
20	Sunshine Locality		January 30, 1978 (#78001731)	Address Restricted	Ely	
21	US Post Office, Ely, Nevada	US Post Office, Ely, Nevada	October 7, 2005 (#05001122)	415 5th St. 39°14′50″N 114°53′35″W	Ely	Now the Hotel Nevada's Postal Palace Convention Center
22	Ward Charcoal Ovens	Ward Charcoal Ovens	September 28, 1971 (#71000491)	South of Ely off U.S. Route 6; 39°02′16″N 114°50′49″W	Ely	
23	White Pine County Courthouse	White Pine County Courthouse	September 11, 1986 (#86001958)	Campton St. 39°14′52″N 114°53′17″W	Ely	

== See also ==
- List of National Historic Landmarks in Nevada
- National Register of Historic Places listings in Nevada
