= National Register of Historic Places listings in Lincoln County, Nevada =

Contents: List of Registered Historic Places in Lincoln County, Nevada, USA:

The locations of National Register properties and districts (at least for all showing latitude and longitude coordinates below), may be seen in an online map by clicking on "Map of all coordinates".

This National Park Service list is complete through NPS recent listings posted February 27, 2026.

Contents: Counties in Nevada / See also: Nevada state-wide list
- Carson City
- Churchill
- Clark
- Douglas
- Elko
- Esmeralda
- Eureka
- Humboldt
- Lander
- Lincoln
- Lyon
- Mineral
- Nye
- Pershing
- Storey
- Washoe
- White Pine

== Current listings ==
	Name on the Register	Image	Date listed	Location	City or town	Description
1	1938 Lincoln County Courthouse	1938 Lincoln County Courthouse	July 25, 2002 (#02000820)	1 Main St. 37°56′13″N 114°27′02″W	Pioche	
2	Black Canyon Petroglyphs	Black Canyon Petroglyphs	May 27, 1975 (#75001113)	Pahranagat National Wildlife Refuge; Address Restricted	Alamo	
3	Bristol Wells Town Site	Bristol Wells Town Site	March 24, 1972 (#72000765)	23 miles north of Pioche off U.S. Route 93; 38°06′22″N 114°41′42″W	Pioche	
4	Brown's Hall-Thompson's Opera House	Brown's Hall-Thompson's Opera House	August 16, 1984 (#84002074)	644 Main St. 37°55′49″N 114°27′04″W	Pioche	
5	Caliente Railroad Depot	Caliente Railroad Depot	March 5, 1974 (#74001146)	100 Depot Ave. 37°36′45″N 114°30′51″W	Caliente	
6	Gem Theater	Gem Theater	February 7, 2024 (#100009942)	648 Main Street; 37°55′48″N 114°27′04″W	Pioche	
7	Lincoln County Courthouse	Lincoln County Courthouse	February 23, 1978 (#78001724)	Lacour St. 37°55′54″N 114°27′07″W	Pioche	
8	Panaca Summit Archeological District		March 19, 1990 (#90000362)	Address Restricted	Panaca	
9	Pioche Firehouse	Pioche Firehouse	February 5, 2018 (#100002070)	Lots 3 & 32, Block 1 of Pioche Townsite, N of Main St. & Lacour; 37°55′47″N 114°27′06″W	Pioche	
10	Smith Hotel-Cornelius Hotel	Smith Hotel-Cornelius Hotel	June 10, 2008 (#08000510)	100 Spring St. 37°36′56″N 114°30′39″W	Caliente	See this story.
11	White River Narrows Archeological District	White River Narrows Archeological District	August 1, 1978 (#78001723)	Weepah Spring Wilderness; Address Restricted	Hiko	

== See also ==
- List of National Historic Landmarks in Nevada
- National Register of Historic Places listings in Nevada
