= National Register of Historic Places listings in Pershing County, Nevada =

Contents: List of Registered Historic Places in Pershing County, Nevada, USA:

The locations of National Register properties and districts (at least for all showing latitude and longitude coordinates below), may be seen in an online map by clicking on "Map of all coordinates".

This National Park Service list is complete through NPS recent listings posted November 21, 2025.

Contents: Counties in Nevada / See also: Nevada state-wide list
- Carson City
- Churchill
- Clark
- Douglas
- Elko
- Esmeralda
- Eureka
- Humboldt
- Lander
- Lincoln
- Lyon
- Mineral
- Nye
- Pershing
- Storey
- Washoe
- White Pine

== Current listings ==
	Name on the Register	Image	Date listed	Location	City or town	Description
1	Applegate-Lassen Trail		December 18, 1978 (#78001722)	Trail extends from Rye Patch northwest to state line 41°11′45″N 119°16′36″W	Black Rock Desert	
2	Central Pacific Railroad Depot	Central Pacific Railroad Depot	April 15, 2004 (#04000300)	1005 W. Broadway Ave. 40°10′47″N 118°28′22″W	Lovelock	
3	Dave Canyon, Se'aquada, Table Mountain		March 23, 2005 (#05000207)	Address Restricted	Lovelock	
4	Leonard Rock Shelter		October 15, 1966 (#66000457)	Address Restricted	Lovelock	
5	Marzen House	Marzen House	August 27, 1981 (#81000384)	South of Lovelock; 40°10′15″N 118°28′53″W	Lovelock	
6	Pershing County Courthouse	Pershing County Courthouse	May 13, 1986 (#86001077)	400 Main St. 40°08′35″N 118°30′09″W	Lovelock	
7	Rye Patch Archeological Sites		August 2, 1978 (#78001726)	Address Restricted	Lovelock	
8	US Post Office-Lovelock Main	US Post Office-Lovelock Main	February 28, 1990 (#90000134)	390 Main St. 40°10′51″N 118°28′28″W	Lovelock	
9	Vocational-Agriculture Building	Vocational-Agriculture Building	October 24, 1991 (#91001528)	1170 Elmhurst St. 40°14′46″N 118°32′57″W	Lovelock	

== See also ==
- List of National Historic Landmarks in Nevada
- National Register of Historic Places listings in Nevada
