= National Register of Historic Places listings in Storey County, Nevada =

Contents: List of Registered Historic Places in Storey County, Nevada, USA:

The locations of National Register properties and districts (at least for all showing latitude and longitude coordinates below), may be seen in an online map by clicking on "Map of all coordinates".

This National Park Service list is complete through NPS recent listings posted November 21, 2025.

Contents: Counties in Nevada / See also: Nevada state-wide list
- Carson City
- Churchill
- Clark
- Douglas
- Elko
- Esmeralda
- Eureka
- Humboldt
- Lander
- Lincoln
- Lyon
- Mineral
- Nye
- Pershing
- Storey
- Washoe
- White Pine

== Current listings ==
	Name on the Register	Image	Date listed	Location	City or town	Description
1	Chollar Mansion	Chollar Mansion	August 5, 1993 (#93000689)	565 S. D St. 39°18′10″N 119°39′03″W	Virginia City	
2	Derby Diversion Dam	Derby Diversion Dam	April 26, 1978 (#78001727)	19 miles (30.4 km) east of Sparks on Interstate 80; 39°35′09″N 119°26′49″W	Sparks	Extends into Washoe County
3	King-McBride Mansion	King-McBride Mansion	September 4, 1998 (#98001086)	26-28 S. Howard St. 39°18′38″N 119°39′03″W	Virginia City	
4	Lagomarsino Petroglyph Site	Lagomarsino Petroglyph Site	March 24, 1978 (#78001728)	Address Restricted	Virginia City	
5	Marlette Lake Water System	Marlette Lake Water System	September 16, 1992 (#92001162)	Roughly from Marlette Lake east to State Route 80; 39°13′15″N 119°49′17″W	Virginia City	
6	McCarthy House	McCarthy House	October 31, 1995 (#95001231)	50 S. I St. 39°18′30″N 119°38′48″W	Virginia City	
7	Parish House	Parish House	August 5, 1993 (#93000688)	109 S. F St. 39°18′33″N 119°38′48″W	Virginia City	
8	Piper's Opera House	Piper's Opera House	March 21, 1997 (#97000217)	1, 3, and 5 N. B St. 39°18′39″N 119°39′06″W	Virginia City	
9	Piper-Beebe House	Piper-Beebe House	August 5, 1993 (#93000684)	2 South A St. 39°18′40″N 119°38′59″W	Virginia City	
10	Henry Piper House	Henry Piper House	May 4, 2011 (#11000254)	58 North B St. 39°18′42″N 119°38′59″W	Virginia City	
11	C.J. Prescott House	C.J. Prescott House	August 5, 1993 (#93000687)	12 Hickey St. 39°18′12″N 119°39′05″W	Virginia City	
12	Virginia City Historic District	Virginia City Historic District	October 15, 1966 (#66000458)	Virginia City and its environs 39°15′35″N 119°35′19″W	Virginia City	Extends into Lyon County

== See also ==
- List of National Historic Landmarks in Nevada
- National Register of Historic Places listings in Nevada
