= National Register of Historic Places listings in Churchill County, Nevada =

List of Registered Historic Places in Churchill County, Nevada, USA:

The locations of National Register properties and districts (at least for all showing latitude and longitude coordinates below), may be seen in an online map by clicking on "Map of all coordinates".

This National Park Service list is complete through NPS recent listings posted November 21, 2025.

Contents: Counties in Nevada / See also: Nevada state-wide list
- Carson City
- Churchill
- Clark
- Douglas
- Elko
- Esmeralda
- Eureka
- Humboldt
- Lander
- Lincoln
- Lyon
- Mineral
- Nye
- Pershing
- Storey
- Washoe
- White Pine

== Current listings ==
| | Name on the Register | Image | Date listed | Location | City or town | Description |
|---|---|---|---|---|---|---|
| 1 | Carson River Diversion Dam | Carson River Diversion Dam | March 25, 1981 (#81000380) | Carson River; 39°29′50″N 118°59′57″W | Fallon | |
| 2 | Churchill County Courthouse | Churchill County Courthouse | September 23, 1992 (#92001258) | 10 Williams St. 39°28′30″N 118°46′51″W | Fallon | |
| 3 | Churchill County Jail | Churchill County Jail | April 9, 2002 (#01001546) | 10 W. Williams Ave. 39°28′30″N 118°46′36″W | Fallon | |
| 4 | Cold Springs Pony Express Station Ruins | Cold Springs Pony Express Station Ruins | May 16, 1978 (#78001718) | Address Restricted | Frenchman | |
| 5 | Cold Springs Station Site | Cold Springs Station Site | February 23, 1972 (#72000762) | 51 miles west of Austin on U.S. Route 50; 39°23′31″N 117°51′12″W | Austin | |
| 6 | The Cottage Schools | The Cottage Schools | June 10, 2008 (#08000509) | 255 E. Stillwater Ave. 39°28′19″N 118°46′25″W | Fallon | (School Buildings in Nevada MPS) |
| 7 | Douglass-Frey Ranch | | November 17, 2015 (#15000796) | 1075 Dodge Ln. 39°22′34″N 118°45′18″W | Fallon vicinity | |
| 8 | Robert L. Douglass House | Robert L. Douglass House | August 13, 2001 (#01000822) | 10 S. Carson St. 39°28′29″N 118°46′42″W | Fallon | |
| 9 | Fallon City Hall | Fallon City Hall | October 27, 2004 (#04001197) | 55 E. Williams Ave. 39°28′28″N 118°46′36″W | Fallon | |
| 10 | Federal Building and Post Office | Federal Building and Post Office | March 8, 2006 (#06000109) | 90 N. Maine St. 39°28′34″N 118°46′32″W | Fallon | |
| 11 | Fort Churchill and Sand Springs Toll Road | Fort Churchill and Sand Springs Toll Road | November 24, 1997 (#97001383) | Address Restricted | Fallon | |
| 12 | Grimes Point | Grimes Point | February 23, 1972 (#72000763) | Along U.S. Route 50 about 7 miles east of Fallon; 39°24′05″N 118°38′50″W | Fallon | |
| 13 | Harmon School | Harmon School | May 23, 1989 (#89000055) | Junction of Kirn Rd. and Harmon Rd. 39°29′26″N 118°41′17″W | Fallon | |
| 14 | Hazen Store | Hazen Store | January 28, 2002 (#01001547) | 600 Reno Highway; 39°33′50″N 119°02′56″W | Hazen | |
| 15 | Holy Trinity Episcopal Church | Holy Trinity Episcopal Church | May 16, 2003 (#03000413) | 507 Churchill St. 39°28′13″N 118°46′32″W | Fallon | |
| 16 | Humboldt Cave | Humboldt Cave | March 15, 1976 (#76001140) | South of Lovelock off U.S. Route 40; 39°52′53″N 118°43′21″W | Lovelock | |
| 17 | Lahontan Dam and Power Station | Lahontan Dam and Power Station | March 25, 1981 (#81000381) | Southwest of Fallon; 39°27′45″N 119°03′53″W | Fallon | |
| 18 | Lovelock Cave | Lovelock Cave | May 24, 1984 (#84002073) | Address Restricted | Lovelock | |
| 19 | Maine Street Historic District | Maine Street Historic District | June 27, 2019 (#100004098) | Downtown along Maine & Center Sts. & Williams Ave. 39°28′23″N 118°46′38″W | Fallon | |
| 20 | Oats Park Grammar School | Oats Park Grammar School | May 2, 1990 (#90000715) | 167 E. Park St. 39°28′24″N 118°46′02″W | Fallon | |
| 21 | Sand Springs Station | Sand Springs Station | November 21, 1980 (#80002465) | Address Restricted | Fallon | |
| 22 | Stillwater Marsh | | March 19, 1975 (#75001104) | Address Restricted | Fallon | |

== See also ==
- List of National Historic Landmarks in Nevada
- National Register of Historic Places listings in Nevada
