= National Register of Historic Places listings in Lyon County, Nevada =

Contents: List of Registered Historic Places in Lyon County, Nevada, USA:

The locations of National Register properties and districts (at least for all showing latitude and longitude coordinates below), may be seen in an online map by clicking on "Map of all coordinates".

This National Park Service list is complete through NPS recent listings posted May 1, 2026.

Contents: Counties in Nevada / See also: Nevada state-wide list
- Carson City
- Churchill
- Clark
- Douglas
- Elko
- Esmeralda
- Eureka
- Humboldt
- Lander
- Lincoln
- Lyon
- Mineral
- Nye
- Pershing
- Storey
- Washoe
- White Pine

== Current listings ==
| | Name on the Register | Image | Date listed | Location | City or town | Description |
|---|---|---|---|---|---|---|
| 1 | Buckland Station | Buckland Station | December 29, 1997 (#97001546) | 7 miles south of the junction of U.S. Route 50 and State Route 95; 39°17′40″N 119°15′02″W | Silver Springs | |
| 2 | East Walker River Petroglyph Site | | July 24, 1980 (#80002468) | Address Restricted | Yerington vicinity | |
| 3 | Fernley and Lassen Railway Depot | Fernley and Lassen Railway Depot | June 1, 2005 (#05000513) | 675 E. Main St. 39°36′21″N 119°14′12″W | Fernley | |
| 4 | Fernley Community Church | Fernley Community Church | May 16, 2003 (#03000414) | 80 S. Center St. 39°36′24″N 119°15′05″W | Fernley | |
| 5 | Fort Churchill | Fort Churchill | October 15, 1966 (#66000456) | U.S. Route 95 Alternate, 8 miles south of U.S. Route 50; 39°17′33″N 119°16′14″W | Silver Springs | |
| 6 | I.O.O.F. Building, Mason Valley | I.O.O.F. Building, Mason Valley | August 4, 1983 (#83001111) | 1 S. Main St. 38°59′02″N 119°10′11″W | Yerington | |
| 7 | Lyon County Courthouse | Lyon County Courthouse | March 24, 1983 (#83001112) | 31 S. Main St. 38°59′11″N 119°09′46″W | Yerington | |
| 8 | US Post Office-Yerington Main | US Post Office-Yerington Main | February 28, 1990 (#90000138) | 28 N. Main St. 38°59′17″N 119°09′42″W | Yerington | |
| 9 | Virginia City Historic District | Virginia City Historic District | October 15, 1966 (#66000458) | Virginia City and its environs 39°15′35″N 119°35′19″W | Virginia City | Extends into Storey County |
| 10 | Yerington Grammar School | Yerington Grammar School | August 16, 1984 (#84002075) | 112 N. California St. 38°59′20″N 119°09′37″W | Yerington | |

== See also ==
- List of National Historic Landmarks in Nevada
- National Register of Historic Places listings in Nevada
