= National Register of Historic Places listings in Lander County, Nevada =

Contents: List of Registered Historic Places in Lander County, Nevada, USA:

The locations of National Register properties and districts (at least for all showing latitude and longitude coordinates below), may be seen in an online map by clicking on "Map of all coordinates".

This National Park Service list is complete through NPS recent listings posted November 21, 2025.

Contents: Counties in Nevada / See also: Nevada state-wide list
- Carson City
- Churchill
- Clark
- Douglas
- Elko
- Esmeralda
- Eureka
- Humboldt
- Lander
- Lincoln
- Lyon
- Mineral
- Nye
- Pershing
- Storey
- Washoe
- White Pine

== Current listings ==
	Name on the Register	Image	Date listed	Location	City or town	Description
1	Austin Cemetery	Austin Cemetery	August 14, 2003 (#03000753)	Northern and southern sides of U.S. Route 50 near its junction with State Route 305; 39°30′04″N 117°05′04″W	Austin	
2	Austin City Hall	Austin City Hall	August 14, 2003 (#03000754)	90 South St. 39°29′33″N 117°04′15″W	Austin	
3	Austin Historic District	Austin Historic District	November 23, 1971 (#71000489)	In Pony Canyon at the junction of State Route 8A and U.S. Route 50; 39°29′37″N 117°04′15″W	Austin	
4	Austin Masonic and Odd Fellows Hall	Austin Masonic and Odd Fellows Hall	August 14, 2003 (#03000756)	105 Main St. 39°29′34″N 117°04′10″W	Austin	
5	Austin Methodist Church	Austin Methodist Church	August 14, 2003 (#03000751)	135 Court St. 39°29′32″N 117°04′06″W	Austin	
6	Gridley Store	Gridley Store	August 14, 2003 (#03000752)	247 Water St. 39°29′22″N 117°03′47″W	Austin	Store operated by Reuel Colt Gridley
7	Lander County Courthouse	Lander County Courthouse	August 14, 2003 (#03000750)	122 Main St. 39°29′31″N 117°04′11″W	Austin	
8	Lander County High School	Lander County High School	July 20, 2000 (#00000821)	130 6th St. 39°29′37″N 117°04′08″W	Austin	
9	Nevada Central Turntable	Nevada Central Turntable	August 14, 2003 (#03000759)	Off Austin Roping Arena Rd. on the southern side of U.S. Route 50; 39°29′50″N 117°05′02″W	Austin	
10	St. Augustine's Catholic Church	St. Augustine's Catholic Church	August 14, 2003 (#03000758)	113 Virginia St. 39°29′35″N 117°04′11″W	Austin	
11	St. George's Episcopal Church	St. George's Episcopal Church	August 14, 2003 (#03000755)	156 Main St. 39°29′28″N 117°04′07″W	Austin	
12	Stokes Castle	Stokes Castle	August 14, 2003 (#03000757)	Along U.S. Route 50 west of Austin; 39°29′37″N 117°04′45″W	Austin	
13	Toquima Cave	Toquima Cave	April 4, 2002 (#02000298)	Humboldt-Toiyabe National Forest; 39°11′13″N 116°47′12″W	Austin	

== See also ==
- List of National Historic Landmarks in Nevada
- National Register of Historic Places listings in Nevada
