= National Register of Historic Places listings in Mineral County, Nevada =

Contents: List of Registered Historic Places in Mineral County, Nevada, USA:

The locations of National Register properties and districts (at least for all showing latitude and longitude coordinates below), may be seen in an online map by clicking on "Map of all coordinates".

This National Park Service list is complete through NPS recent listings posted April 17, 2026.

Contents: Counties in Nevada / See also: Nevada state-wide list
- Carson City
- Churchill
- Clark
- Douglas
- Elko
- Esmeralda
- Eureka
- Humboldt
- Lander
- Lincoln
- Lyon
- Mineral
- Nye
- Pershing
- Storey
- Washoe
- White Pine

== Current listings ==
	Name on the Register	Image	Date listed	Location	City or town	Description
1	Aurora	Aurora	July 30, 1974 (#74001147)	Southwest of Hawthorne; 38°17′21″N 118°53′57″W	Hawthorne	
2	Hawthorne USO Building	Hawthorne USO Building	February 18, 2005 (#02000703)	950 E St. 38°31′55″N 118°37′20″W	Hawthorne	
3	Mineral County Courthouse	Mineral County Courthouse	January 29, 1982 (#82003214)	551 C St. 38°31′31″N 118°37′36″W	Hawthorne	
4	Sixth Street School	Sixth Street School	October 7, 1999 (#99001241)	6th and C Sts. 38°32′22″N 118°37′31″W	Hawthorne	

== See also ==
- List of National Historic Landmarks in Nevada
- National Register of Historic Places listings in Nevada
