= National Register of Historic Places listings in Eureka County, Nevada =

Contents: List of Registered Historic Places in Eureka County, Nevada, USA

The locations of National Register properties and districts (at least for all showing latitude and longitude coordinates below), may be seen in an online map by clicking on "Map of all coordinates".

This National Park Service list is complete through NPS recent listings posted November 21, 2025.

Contents: Counties in Nevada / See also: Nevada state-wide list
- Carson City
- Churchill
- Clark
- Douglas
- Elko
- Esmeralda
- Eureka
- Humboldt
- Lander
- Lincoln
- Lyon
- Mineral
- Nye
- Pershing
- Storey
- Washoe
- White Pine

== Current listings ==
	Name on the Register	Image	Date listed	Location	City or town	Description
1	Eureka Historic District	Eureka Historic District	April 13, 1973 (#73001078)	Along U.S. Route 50; 39°30′47″N 115°57′53″W	Eureka	

== See also ==
- List of National Historic Landmarks in Nevada
- National Register of Historic Places listings in Nevada
