= National Register of Historic Places listings in Esmeralda County, Nevada =

Contents: List of Registered Historic Places in Esmeralda County, Nevada, USA:

The locations of National Register properties and districts (at least for all showing latitude and longitude coordinates below), may be seen in an online map by clicking on "Map of all coordinates".

This National Park Service list is complete through NPS recent listings posted November 21, 2025.

Contents: Counties in Nevada / See also: Nevada state-wide list
- Carson City
- Churchill
- Clark
- Douglas
- Elko
- Esmeralda
- Eureka
- Humboldt
- Lander
- Lincoln
- Lyon
- Mineral
- Nye
- Pershing
- Storey
- Washoe
- White Pine

== Current listings ==
	Name on the Register	Image	Date listed	Location	City or town	Description
1	Goldfield Historic District	Goldfield Historic District	June 14, 1982 (#82003213)	Roughly bounded by 5th St. and Miner, Spring, Crystal and Elliott Aves. 37°42′31″N 117°14′03″W	Goldfield	

== See also ==
- List of National Historic Landmarks in Nevada
- National Register of Historic Places listings in Nevada
