= National Register of Historic Places listings in Nevada =

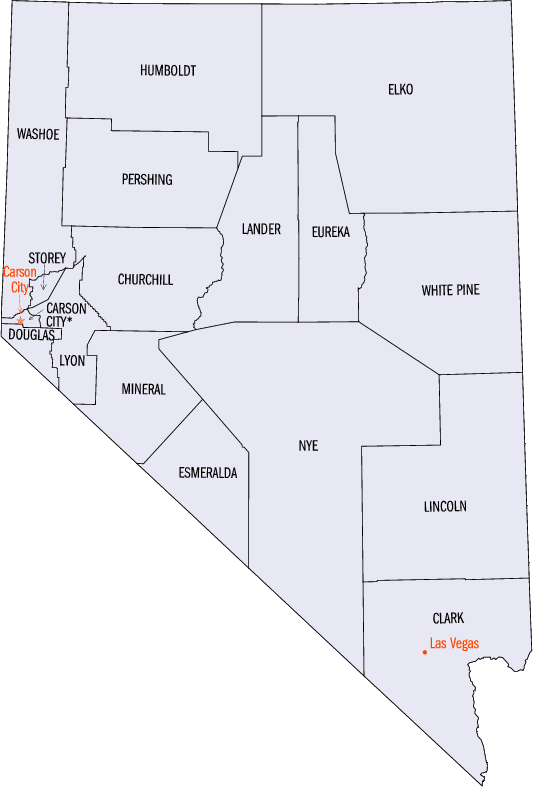
Nevada's counties

This is a list of properties and historic districts in Nevada that are listed on the National Register of Historic Places. There is at least one listing in each of Nevada's 16 counties and one independent city.

== Current listings by county ==
The following are approximate tallies of current listings by county. These counts are based on entries in the National Register Information Database as of April 24, 2008 and new weekly listings posted since then on the National Register of Historic Places web site. There are frequent additions to the listings and occasional delistings and the counts here are approximate and not official. New entries are added to the official Register on a weekly basis. Also, the counts in this table exclude boundary increase and decrease listings which only modify the area covered by an existing property or district, although carrying a separate National Register reference number.

This National Park Service list is complete through NPS recent listings posted July 4, 2026.

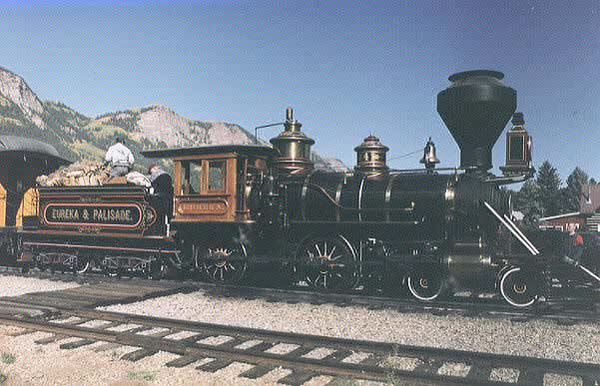
Eureka Locomotive, in Clark County

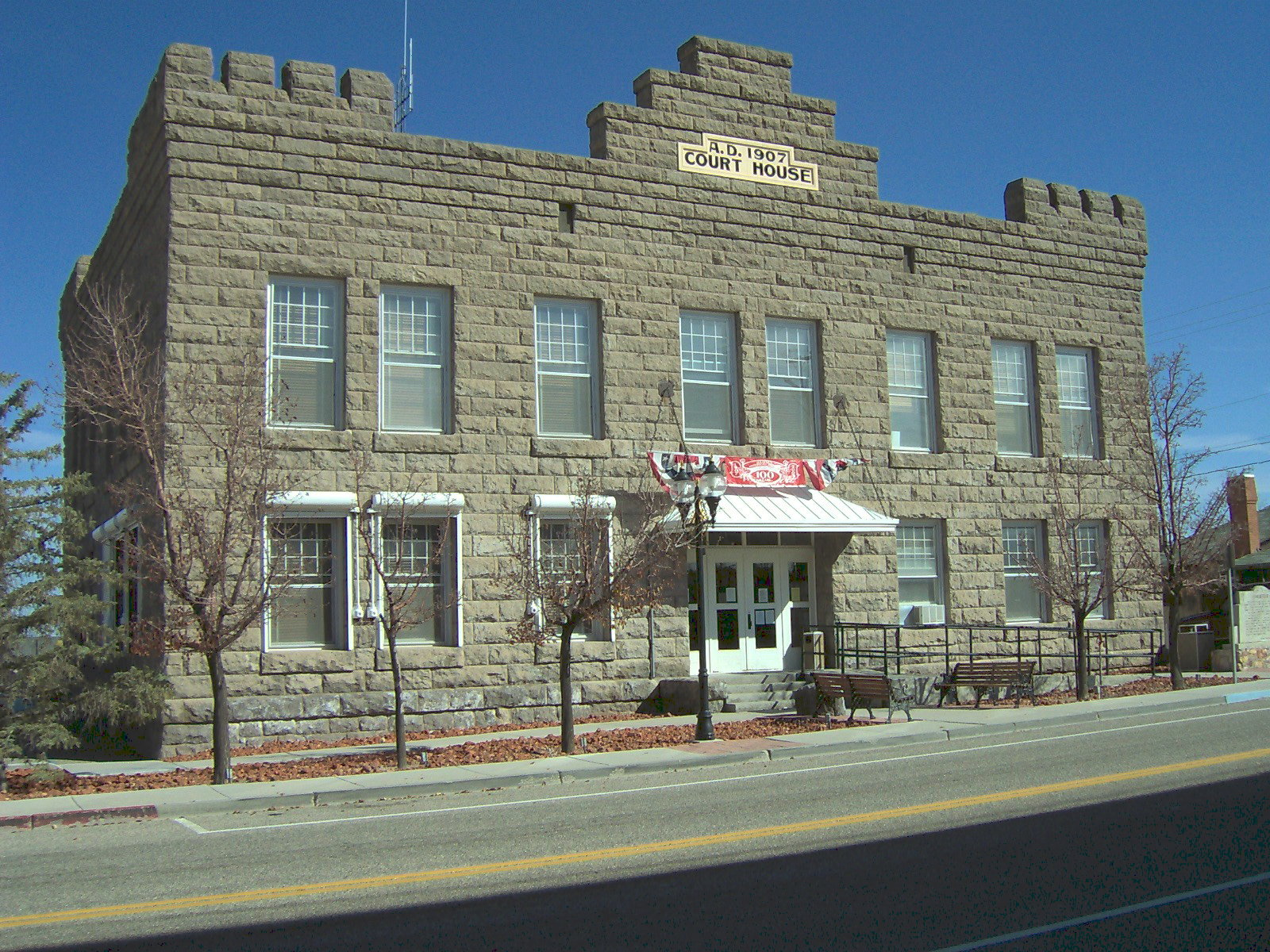
Esmeralda County courthouse, located on Crook Avenue (U.S. Route 95) in Goldfield, Nevada

	County	# of Sites
1	Carson City	44
2	Churchill	22
3	Clark	61
4	Douglas	26
5	Elko	6
6	Esmeralda	1
7	Eureka	1
8	Humboldt	15
9	Lander	13
10	Lincoln	11
11	Lyon	10
12	Mineral	4
13	Nye	53
14	Pershing	9
15	Storey	12
16	Washoe	87
17	White Pine	23
(less duplicates)		(6) (Note: The Marlette Lake Water System extends into three entities: Carson City, Storey County, and Washoe County; the Applegate-Lassen Trail extends into Humboldt, Pershing, and Washoe counties; the Derby Diversion Dam extends into Storey and Washoe counties and the Virginia City Historic District is in both Storey and Lyon counties.)
TOTAL		392

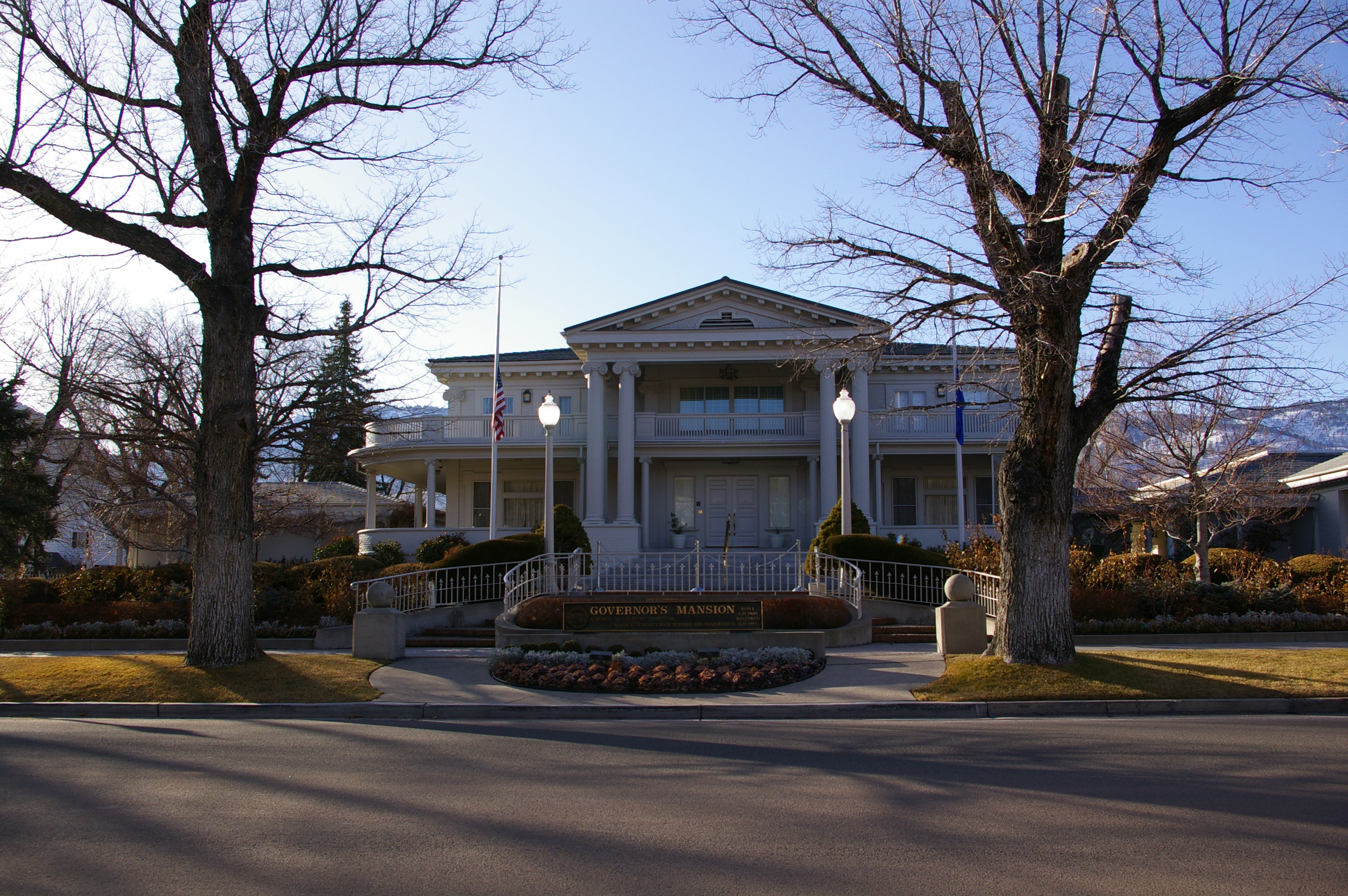
Nevada Governor's Mansion, Carson City

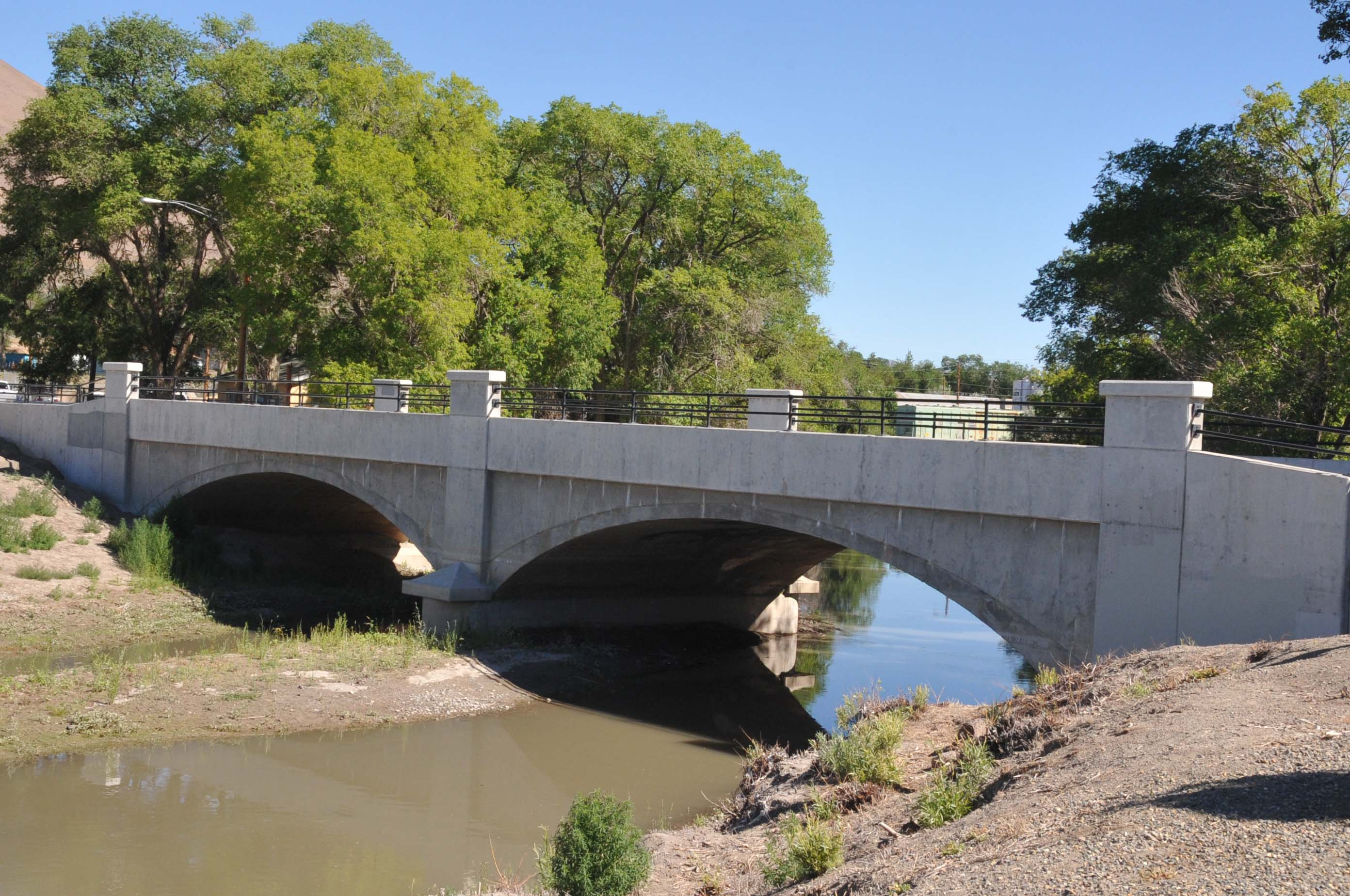
Humboldt River Bridge, one of the last concrete archdeck bridges to survive in Nevada
