= National Register of Historic Places listings in Elko County, Nevada =

Map of Nevada highlighting Elko County

Elko County, Nevada, United States, has six listings on the National Register of Historic Places, and one former listing. The locations of National Register properties and districts (at least for all showing latitude and longitude coordinates below) may be seen in an online map by clicking on "Map of all coordinates".

This National Park Service list is complete through NPS recent listings posted November 21, 2025.

Contents: Counties in Nevada / See also: Nevada state-wide list
- Carson City
- Churchill
- Clark
- Douglas
- Elko
- Esmeralda
- Eureka
- Humboldt
- Lander
- Lincoln
- Lyon
- Mineral
- Nye
- Pershing
- Storey
- Washoe
- White Pine

== Current listings ==
	Name on the Register	Image	Date listed	Location	City or town	Description
1	El Rancho Hotel and Casino		February 7, 2024 (#100009943)	1629 Lake Avenue; 41°06′43″N 114°57′52″W	Wells	
2	Elko County Courthouse	Elko County Courthouse	September 23, 1992 (#92001259)	571 Idaho St. 40°50′01″N 115°45′42″W	Elko	
3	Gold Creek Ranger Station	Gold Creek Ranger Station	September 15, 1992 (#92001187)	East of Mountain City in the Humboldt National Forest; 41°45′04″N 115°40′29″W	Mountain City	
4	Midas Schoolhouse	Midas Schoolhouse	July 21, 2004 (#04000727)	2nd St., two blocks east of Main St. 41°14′32″N 116°47′39″W	Midas	
5	Ruby Valley Pony Express Station	Ruby Valley Pony Express Station	March 10, 1975 (#75001110)	1515 Idaho St. 40°50′33″N 115°45′04″W	Elko	
6	US Post Office-Elko Main	US Post Office-Elko Main	February 28, 1990 (#90000133)	275 3rd 40°49′48″N 115°45′47″W	Elko	

== Former listings ==
	Name on the Register	Image	Date listed	Date removed	Location	City or town	Description
1	Lamoille Organization Camp	Lamoille Organization Camp	June 14, 2007 (#07000553)	February 25, 2021	Right fork of Lamoille Creek at the end of FS Rd. 122, Ruby Mountains Ranger District, in the Humboldt-Toiyabe National Forest; 40°39′24″N 115°26′23″W	Lamoille	Destroyed by the Range 2 fire in October 2018.

== See also ==
- List of National Historic Landmarks in Nevada
- National Register of Historic Places listings in Nevada
