= Nevada Central Turntable =

- U.S. National Register of Historic Places
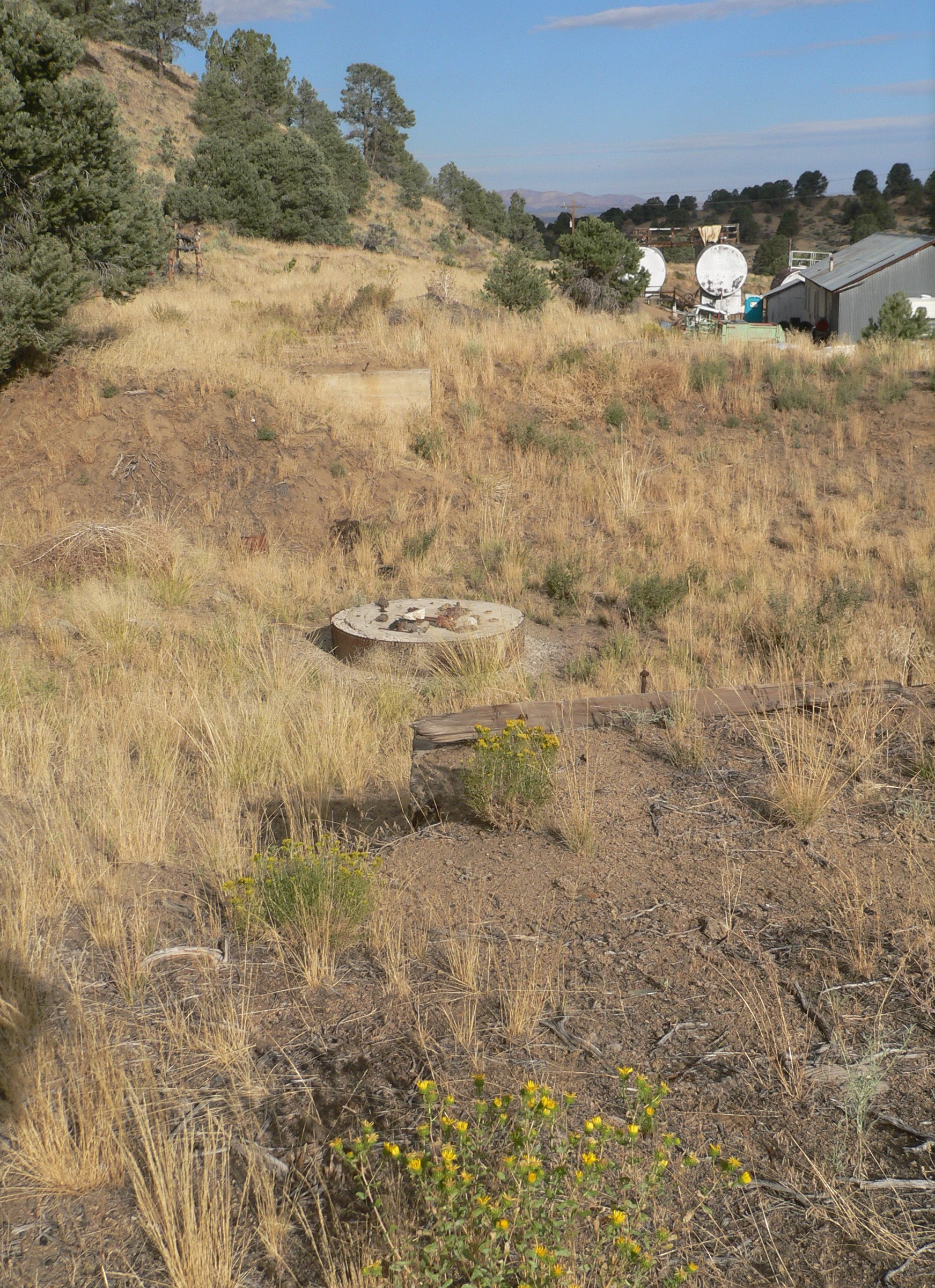
- Looking westward across turntable, along onetime line of tracks

- Location within Nevada Location within the United States
- Location: Off Austin Roping Arena Rd., S side of US 50, Austin, Nevada
- Coordinates: 39°29′49.6″N 117°5′1.85″W
- Area: 0.1 acres (0.040 ha)
- Built: 1880
- Built by: Northwestern Construction Co.; McDonald, D.
- NRHP reference No.: 03000759
- Added to NRHP: August 14, 2003

The Nevada Central Turntable in Austin, Nevada is a railway turntable that was built in 1880 and used until 1938. It served the Nevada Central Railroad. It is located off Austin Roping Arena Rd., on the south side of U.S. 50. It was listed on the National Register of Historic Places in 2003.

It was a work of Northwestern Construction Co. and of D. McDonald.

The site includes concrete foundations of a former engine house, with one stall for a single locomotive. The engine house itself was disassembled and put into storage in the late 1900s, with view towards preservation/restoration somehow later.
