= Smith Hotel-Cornelius Hotel =

- U.S. National Register of Historic Places
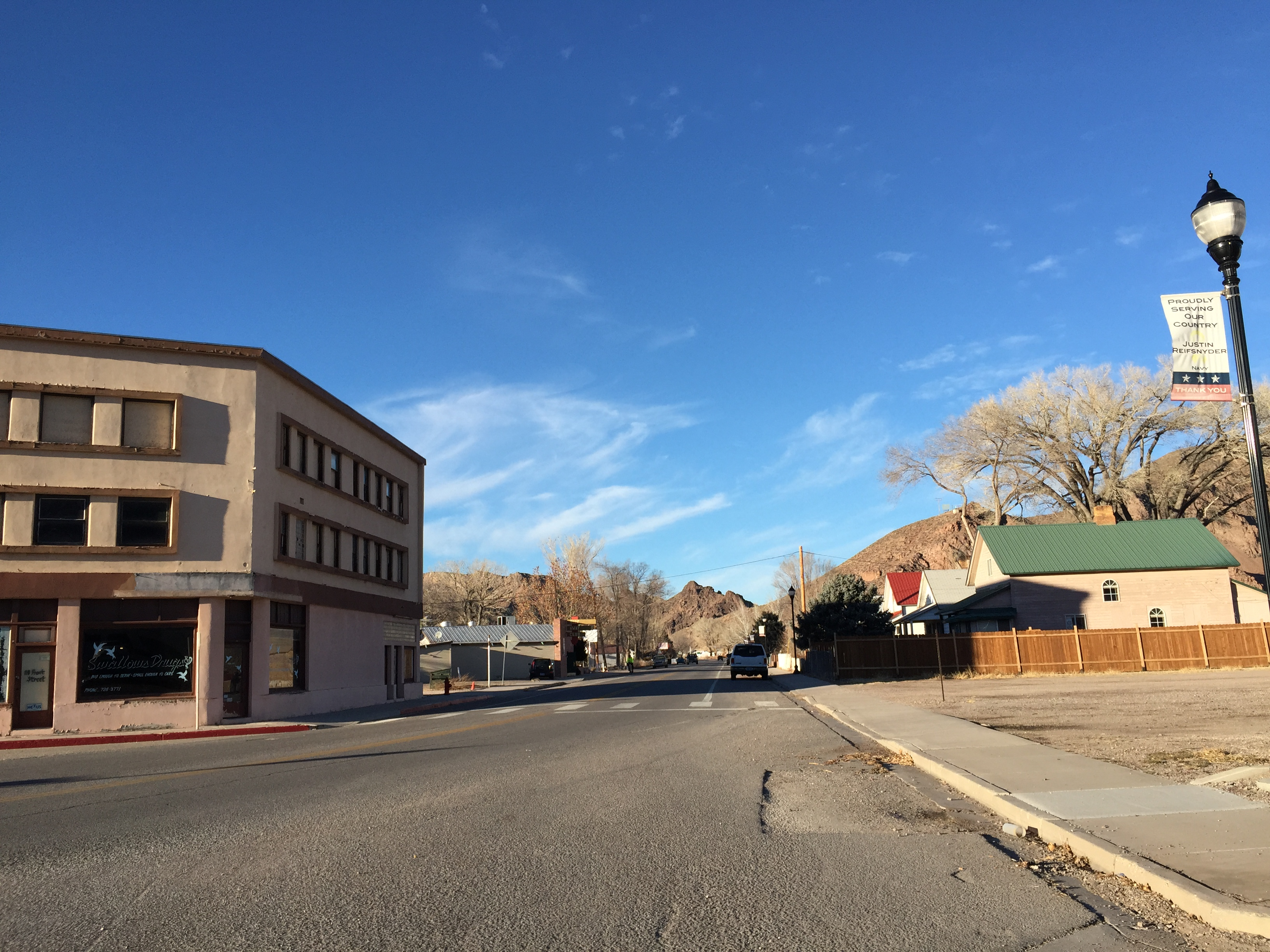
- The hotel, left, in 2015

- Location within Nevada Location within the United States
- Location: 100 Spring St., Caliente, Nevada
- Coordinates: 37°36′56″N 114°30′39″W
- Area: 0.2 acres (0.081 ha)
- Built: c.1919
- NRHP reference No.: 08000510
- Added to NRHP: June 10, 2008

The Smith Hotel-Cornelius Hotel, located at 100 Spring St. in Caliente, Nevada, and also once known as Scott Hotel, is a historic 3-story hotel that was listed on the National Register of Historic Places in 2008.

Caliente became economically important in 1907 with railroad connection and mining and agriculture. The hotel was built probably in 1918 or 1919, by Dr. and Mrs. J. Wesley Smith who ran the hotel until 1921. It was called the Scott Hotel from 1969 until 1978 when the business closed. Although the style of the building is simple, its architecture "reflect[s] the design tastes of the period and region", and the building was held to be significant for its architecture in its NRHP listing. It is also important as one of the oldest surviving buildings in the area.
