= Fernley Community Church =

Historic church in Nevada, United States

- U.S. National Register of Historic Places
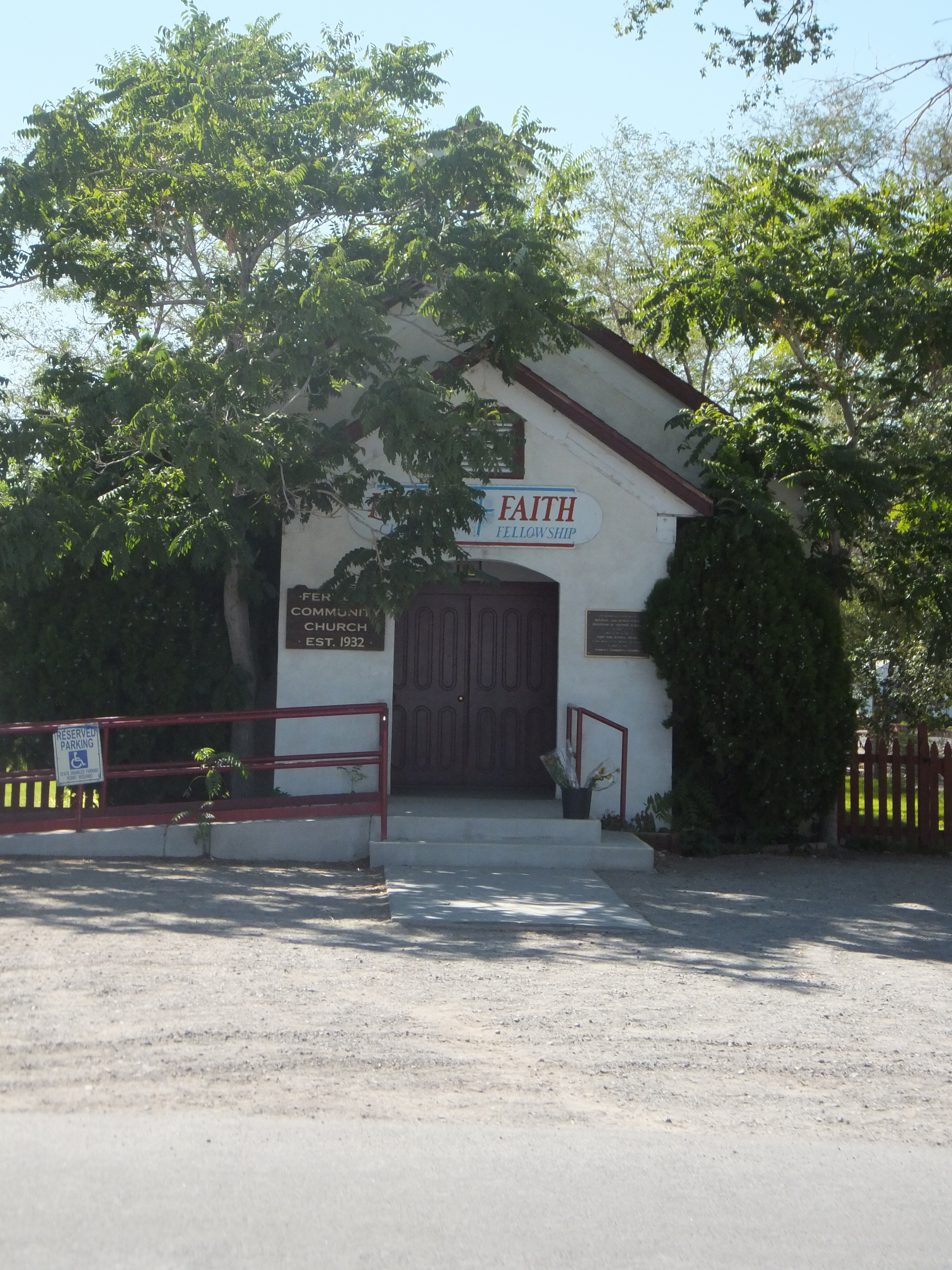
- Fernley Community Church

- Location within Nevada Location within the United States
- Location: 80 S. Center St., Fernley, Nevada
- Coordinates: 39°36′24″N 119°15′05″W
- Area: less than one acre
- Built: 1932
- NRHP reference No.: 03000414
- Added to NRHP: May 16, 2003

Fernley Community Church is a historic church at 80 S. Center Street in Fernley, Nevada. It was built in 1932 and added to the National Register of Historic Places in 2003.

It is a one-story church with a rear ell, with " no real elements of an architectural style".

It was deemed significant as the "building played a central role in the social life of the small rural town of Fernley, Nevada during the mid-20th century. It was the venue for many of the activities that defined community life in Fernley during the 1930s and 1940s, and particularly was the site associated with the charitable efforts of the Fernley Ladies Aid Society."
