= The Cottage Schools =

- U.S. National Register of Historic Places
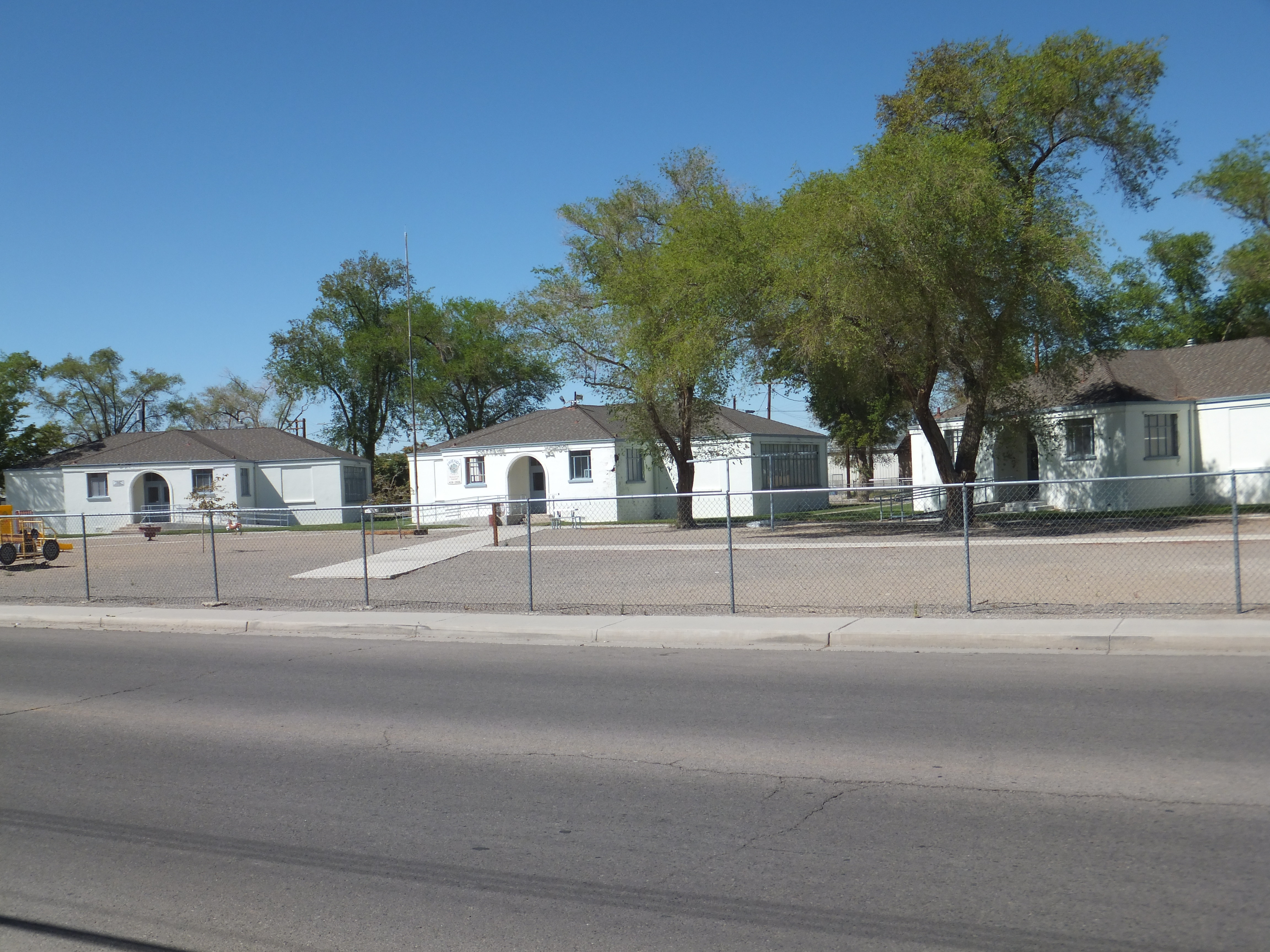

- Location within Nevada Location within the United States
- Location: 255 E. Stillwater Ave., Fallon, Nevada
- Coordinates: 39°28′19″N 118°46′25″W
- Area: 1.4 acres (0.57 ha)
- Built by: Crehore, L.W.; et al.
- Architectural style: Mission/spanish Revival, Modern Movement
- MPS: School Buildings in Nevada MPS
- NRHP reference No.: 08000509
- Added to NRHP: June 10, 2008

The Cottage Schools, at 255 E. Stillwater Ave. in Fallon, Nevada, United States, is a historic set of three school buildings that is listed on the U.S. National Register of Historic Places. As Cottage Elementary School, a school at this site reportedly has four teachers and 39 students.

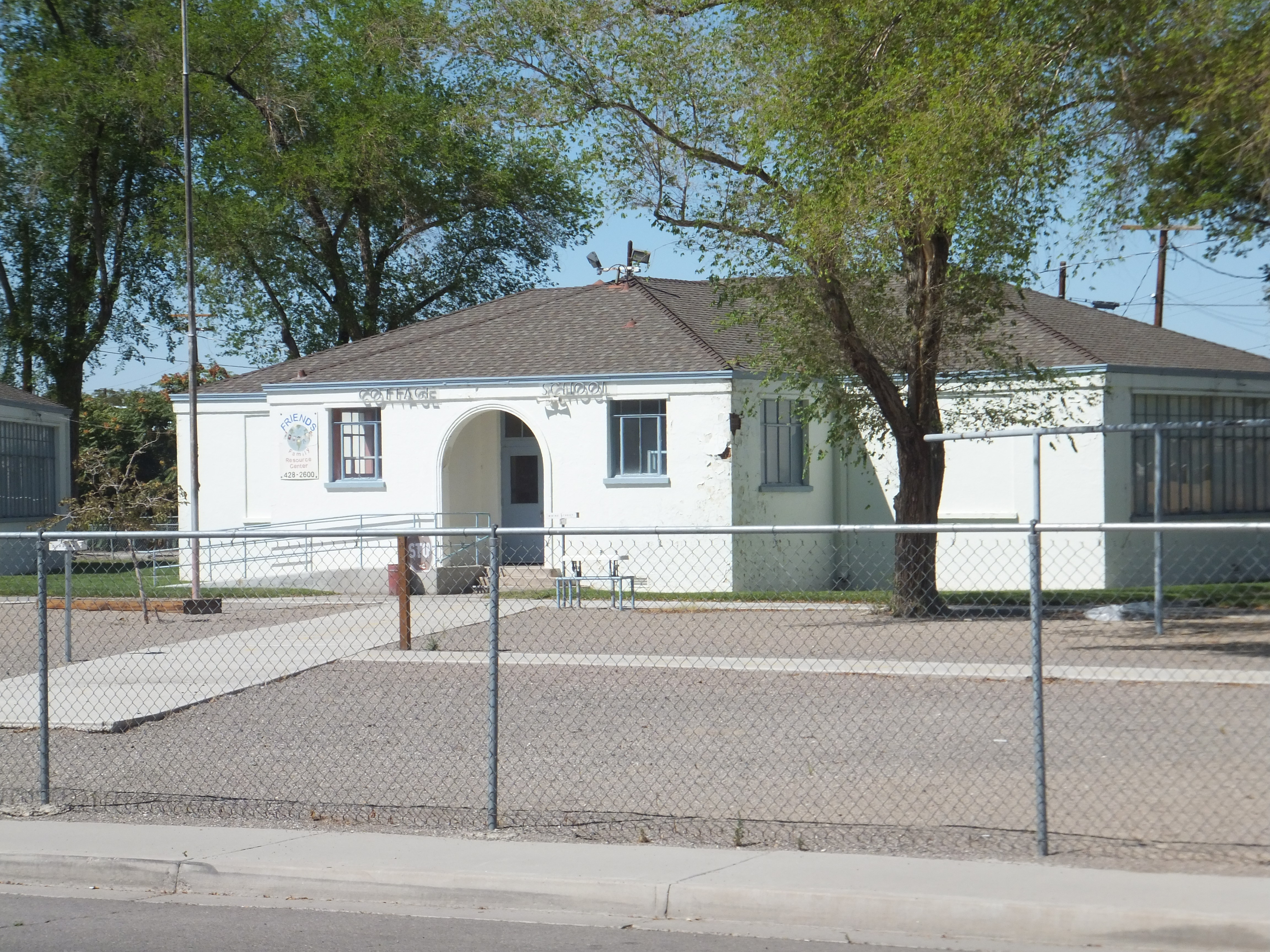

It was listed on the National Register of Historic Places in 2008.
