= Chollar Mansion =

Historic house in Nevada, United States

- U.S. National Register of Historic Places
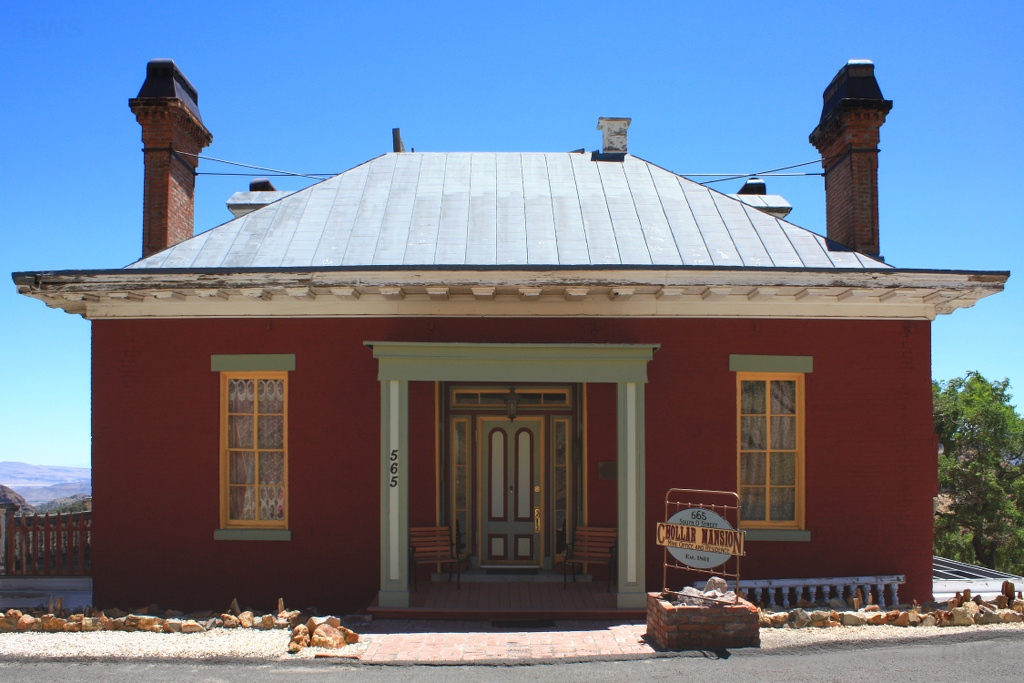
- House in 2016

- Location within Nevada Location within the United States
- Location: 565 S. D St., Virginia City, Nevada
- Coordinates: 39°18′10″N 119°39′3″W
- Area: less than one acre
- Built: 1862–1864
- Built by: Hill, H.S.
- Architect: Coleman, N.J.
- Architectural style: Italianate
- NRHP reference No.: 93000689
- Added to NRHP: August 5, 1993

The Chollar Mansion is located at 565 S. D Street, in Virginia City, western Nevada. It is a historic Victorian Italianate style house, that was built between 1862 and 1864.

The residence was listed on the National Register of Historic Places (NRHP) in 1993. It was deemed significant for its association with William "Billy" Chollar, a miner whose Chollar Mine, later merged with Potosi Mine to form the Chollar-Potosi Mine, tapped part of the Comstock Lode, and yielded enormous amounts of silver ore. It is also significant for its fine Italianate architecture.

== History ==
The Chollar Mansion was designed by N. J. Coleman for William "Billy" Chollar, and was built when Virginia City was the Comstock Lode mining boom town in the 1860s. It was moved about .25 miles (0.40 km) in 1870 due to mining needs.

In 1993, the NRHP registration noted that the house had been turned into a bed and breakfast inn.

== See also ==
- National Register of Historic Places in Storey County, Nevada
