= Last Supper Cave =

- U.S. National Register of Historic Places
- Nearest city: Denio, Nevada
- Area: 1 acre (0.40 ha)
- NRHP reference No.: 75001111
- Added to NRHP: December 6, 1975

The Last Supper Cave, near Denio, Nevada, United States, is an archeological site that is listed on the National Register of Historic Places. It was listed on the National Register in 1975, for its potential to yield information in the future.

Archeologists found that it had "evidence of substantial Paleoindian occupations including 44 Paleoindian points".
