= Maine Street Historic District =

Historic district in Nevada, United States

- U.S. National Register of Historic Places
- U.S. Historic district
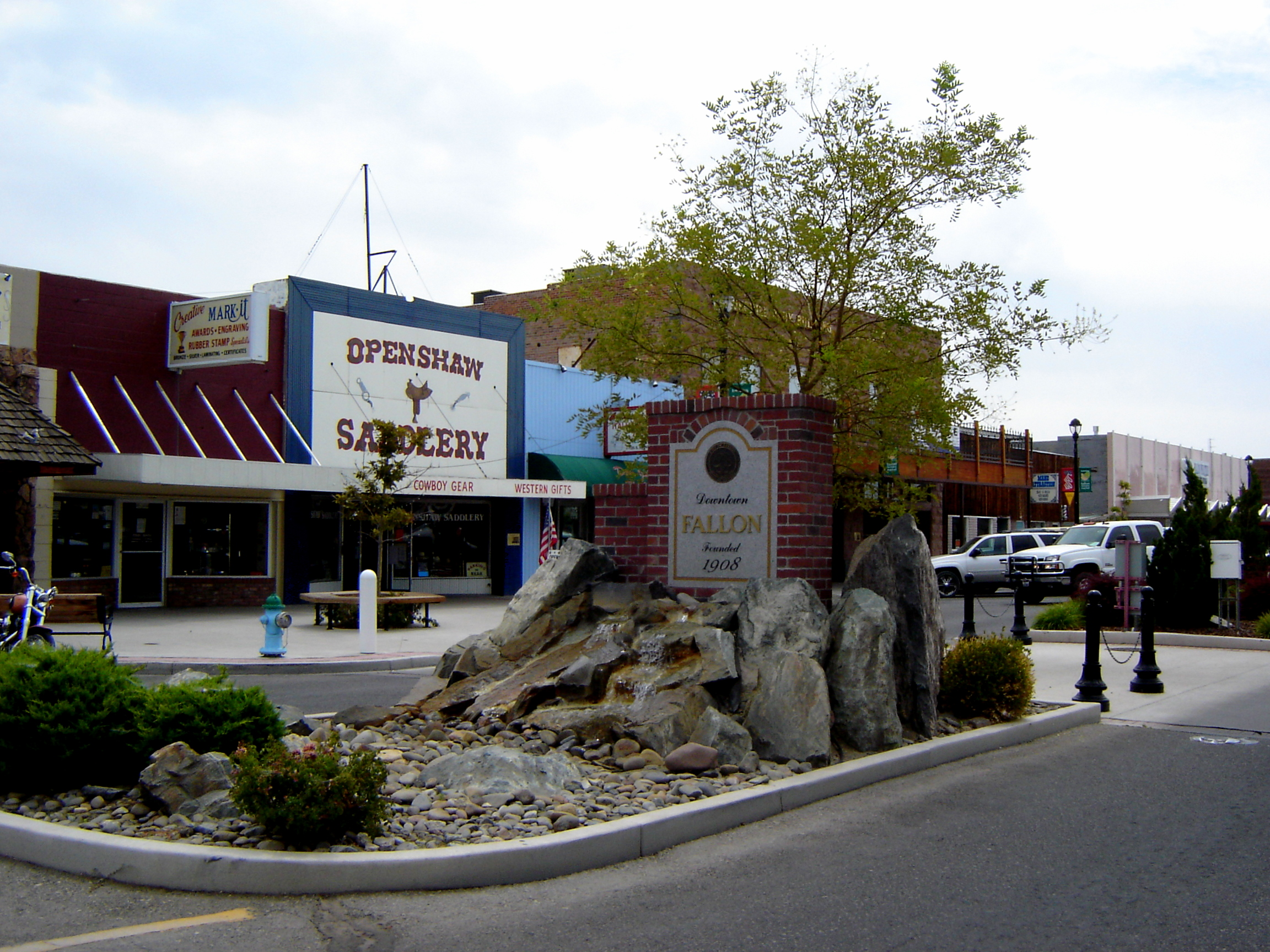

- Location within Nevada
- Location: Downtown along Maine & Center Sts. & Williams Ave., Fallon, Nevada
- Coordinates: 39°28′23″N 118°46′38″W
- NRHP reference No.: 100004098
- Added to NRHP: June 27, 2019

The Maine Street Historic District in is a commercial area located in Fallon, Nevada. It was listed on the National Register of Historic Places in 2019.

== History ==
The area was first populated in the 1900s when a ranch was founded by James W. Richards. Richards' ranch was purchased by state senator Warren W. Williams, who named the surrounding streets "Maine", named after his home state, Maine. He platted the land and introduced more buildings. A 1906 report noted that at that year, the center included a lively collection of general stores, saloons, hotels, restaurants, and drug stores, as well as a butcher, confectionery, bakery, bank, saddle shop, and furniture store.

=== Legacy ===
In June 2019, the district was officially added to the National Register of Historic Places. City Councilwoman Kelly Frost expressed support for the addition, stating that it was "just going to further the work that we’ve already started doing in Fallon".

== Building style ==
In 1954, a severe earthquake struck the area, which led to modernization. This happened because all the buildings in the district were destroyed, so people rebuilt them into a more contemporary style. Typical modernization efforts included installing slipcovers over the existing façade, replacing existing wood windows, and adding awnings over entrances. These projects utilized contemporary materials, including aluminum siding, steel window frames, plate glass, asbestos tiles, and concrete brick.

Examples of buildings that were modernized after their destruction:

- Woodliff Block (116–126 S. Maine) had its shaped parapet replaced with concrete blocks
- The Fallon Arcade and Churchill County Bank Building (131–143 S. Maine) had its castellated parapet removed.
