= Dave Canyon, Se'aquada, Table Mountain =

- U.S. National Register of Historic Places
- Nearest city: Lovelock, Nevada
- NRHP reference No.: 05000207
- Added to NRHP: March 23, 2005

Dave Canyon, Se'aquada, Table Mountain is an archeological site near Lovelock, Nevada, United States, that was listed on the National Register of Historic Places in 2005. It has also been known as Cornish Canyon, and as Site 26 PE3091, as BLM # CrNV-22-7676. The National Register's NRIS database listing indicates the site had "agriculture/subsistence" and "industry/processing/extraction" functions.

Its location is not disclosed by the National Register, which indicates it as "Address Restricted", which is done presumably to avoid damage to the site. Archeological sites such as this are listed on the National Register to provide some protection and for reason of their significance in the way of potential to provide future information.

The listing, like all others, was included in the Federal Register, which noted it was in Pershing County.
