= Golconda School =

- U.S. National Register of Historic Places
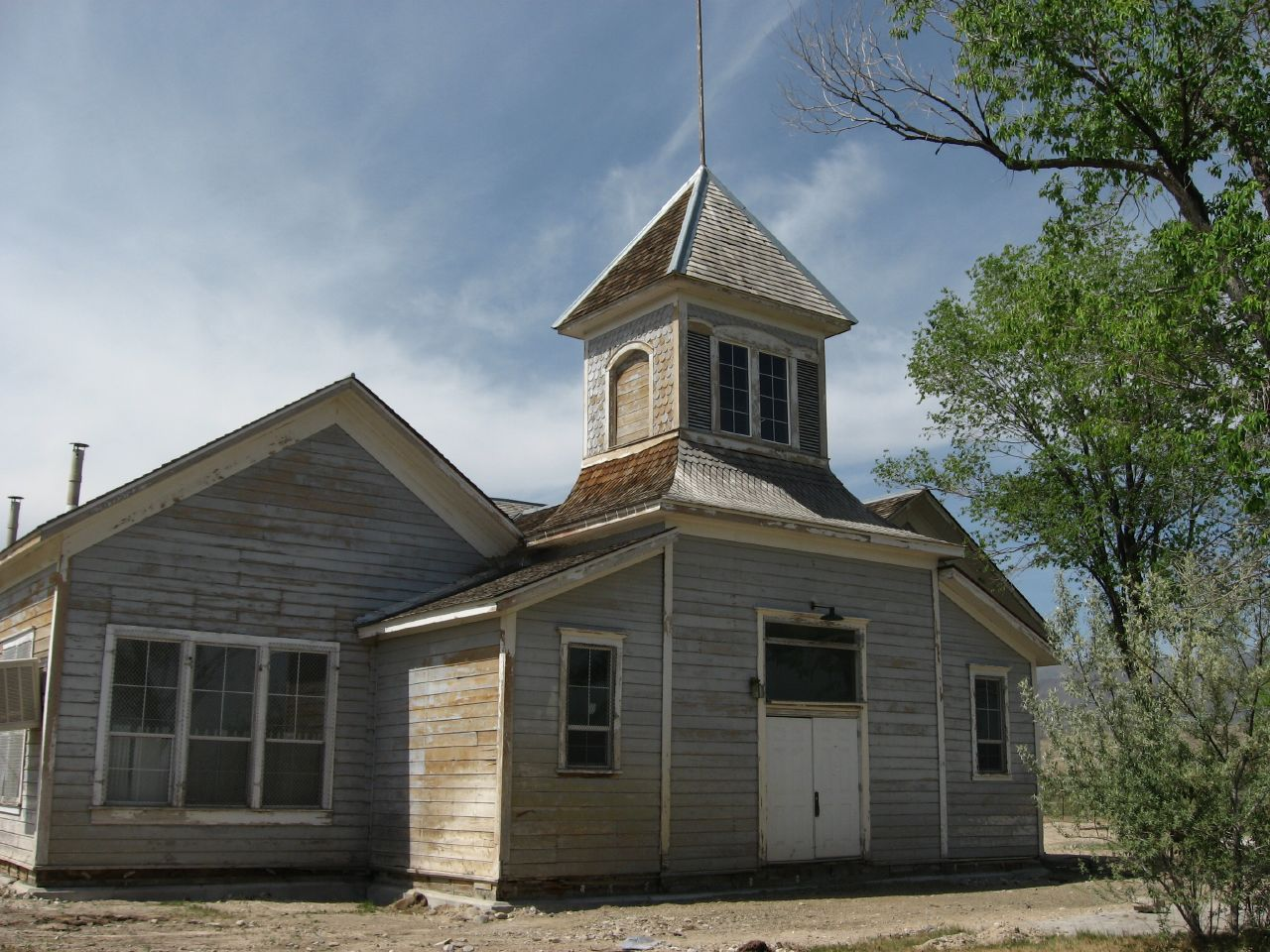
- Photo in 2007

- Location within Nevada Location within the United States
- Location: Jct. of Morrison and Fourth Sts., Golconda, Nevada
- Coordinates: 40.95472°N 117.48904°W
- Area: less than one acre
- Built: 1888
- Built by: LaGrave, C.A.
- Architect: Donnel, J.L.
- Architectural style: Second Empire, Vernacular Second Empire
- NRHP reference No.: 91001651
- Added to NRHP: November 14, 1991

The Golconda School, located at Morrison and Fourth Sts. in Golconda, Nevada, is a historic building built in 1888.

It includes vernacular Second Empire style architectural elements.

== National Register of Historic Places ==
The school was listed on the National Register of Historic Places in 1991.

It was deemed significant for association with the economic development of Golconda, for "documenting the history of education in Nevada", and "as an unusually well-preserved 19th century wood-frame vernacular school."

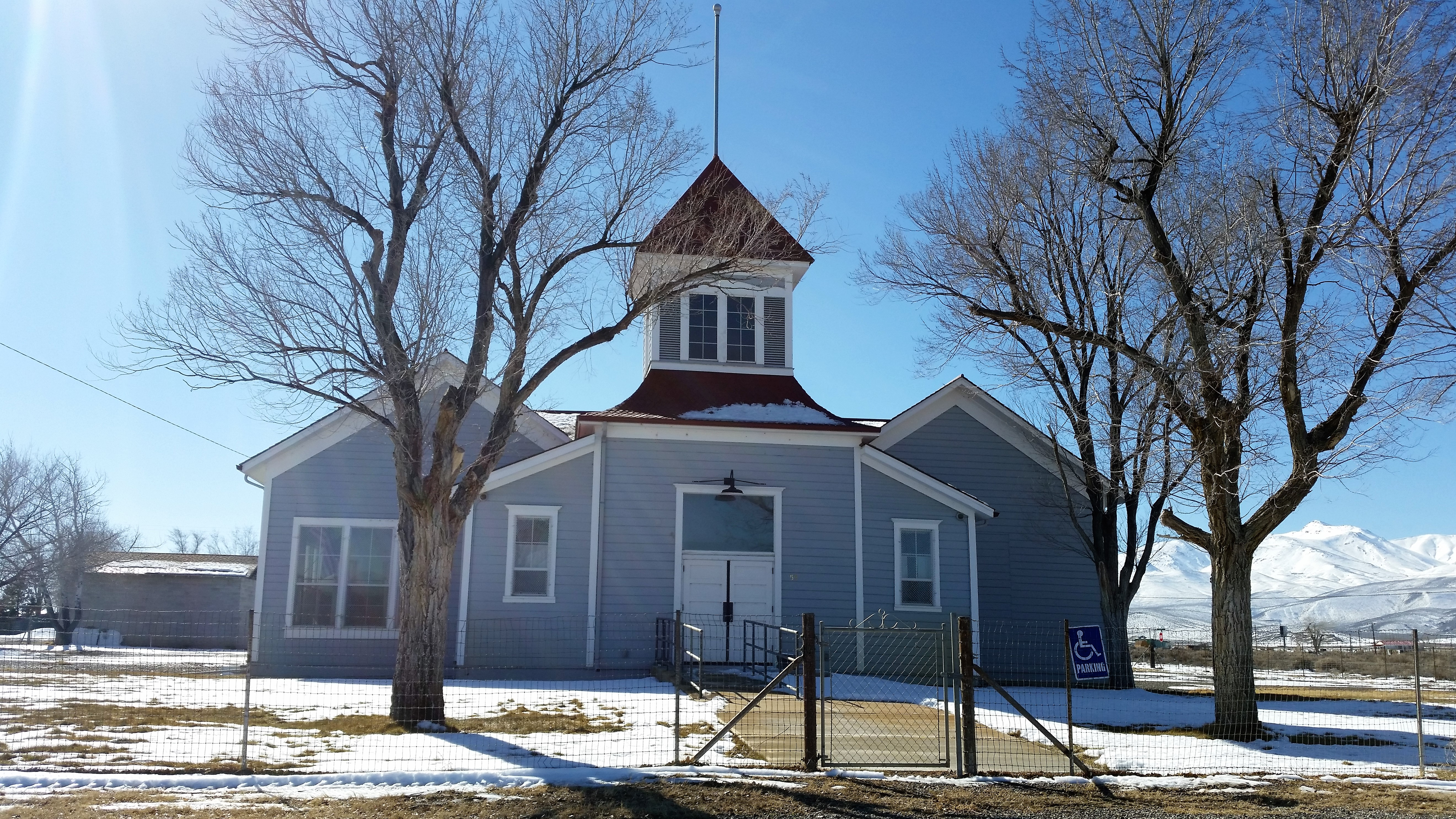
Front facade.

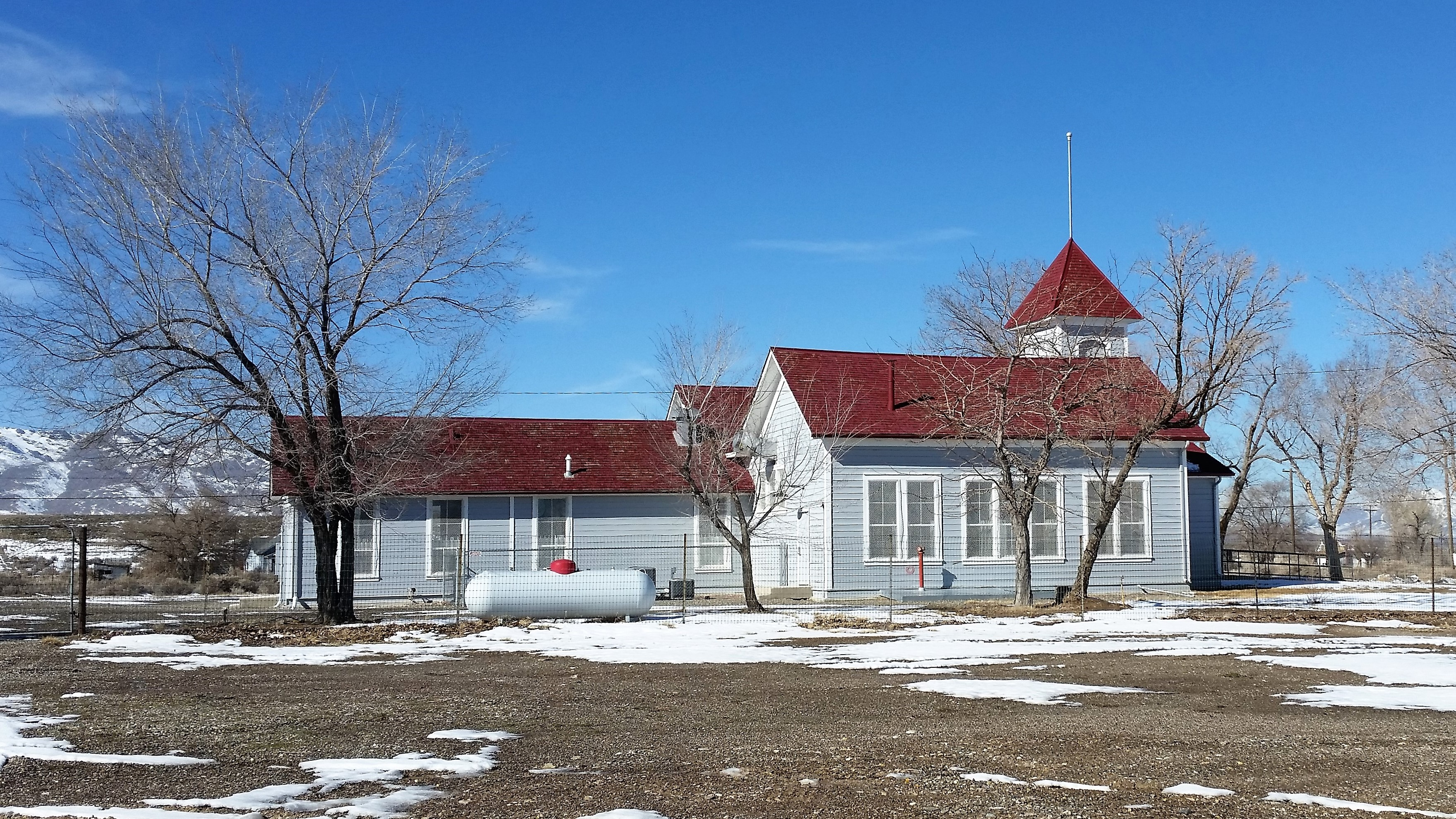
Western side facade.
