= Ely City Hall and Fire Station =

- U.S. National Register of Historic Places
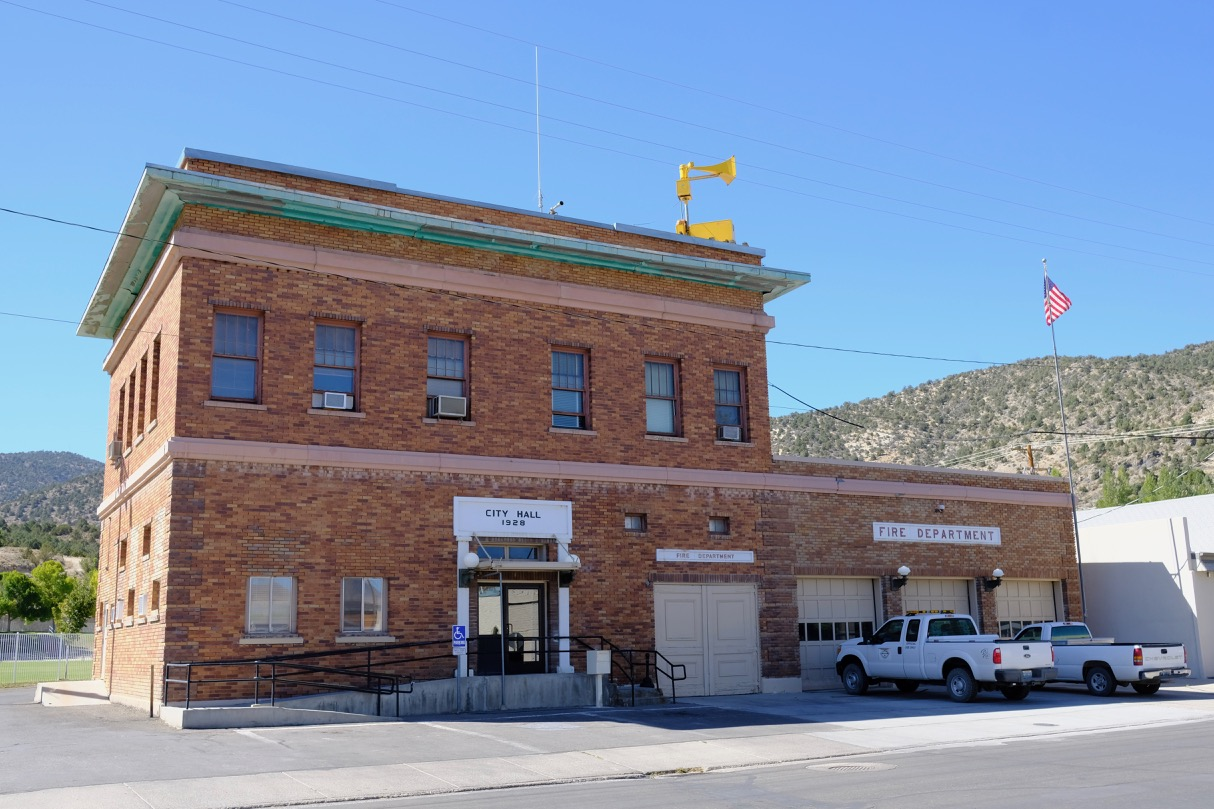

- Location within Nevada
- Location: 501 Mill St., Ely, Nevada
- Coordinates: 39°14′49″N 114°53′41″W
- Area: less than one acre
- Built: 1929
- NRHP reference No.: 100002071
- Added to NRHP: February 5, 2018

The Ely City Hall and Fire Station, at 501 Mill St. in Ely in White Pine County, Nevada, was listed on the National Register of Historic Places in 2018.

It "was recognized for its role as the seat of the City of Ely's government from its construction in 1929 to the present, as well as its role as the headquarters for Ely's Fire Department from 1929 to 1999."
