= W.C. Record House =

Historic house in Nevada, United States

- W. C. Record House
- U.S. National Register of Historic Places
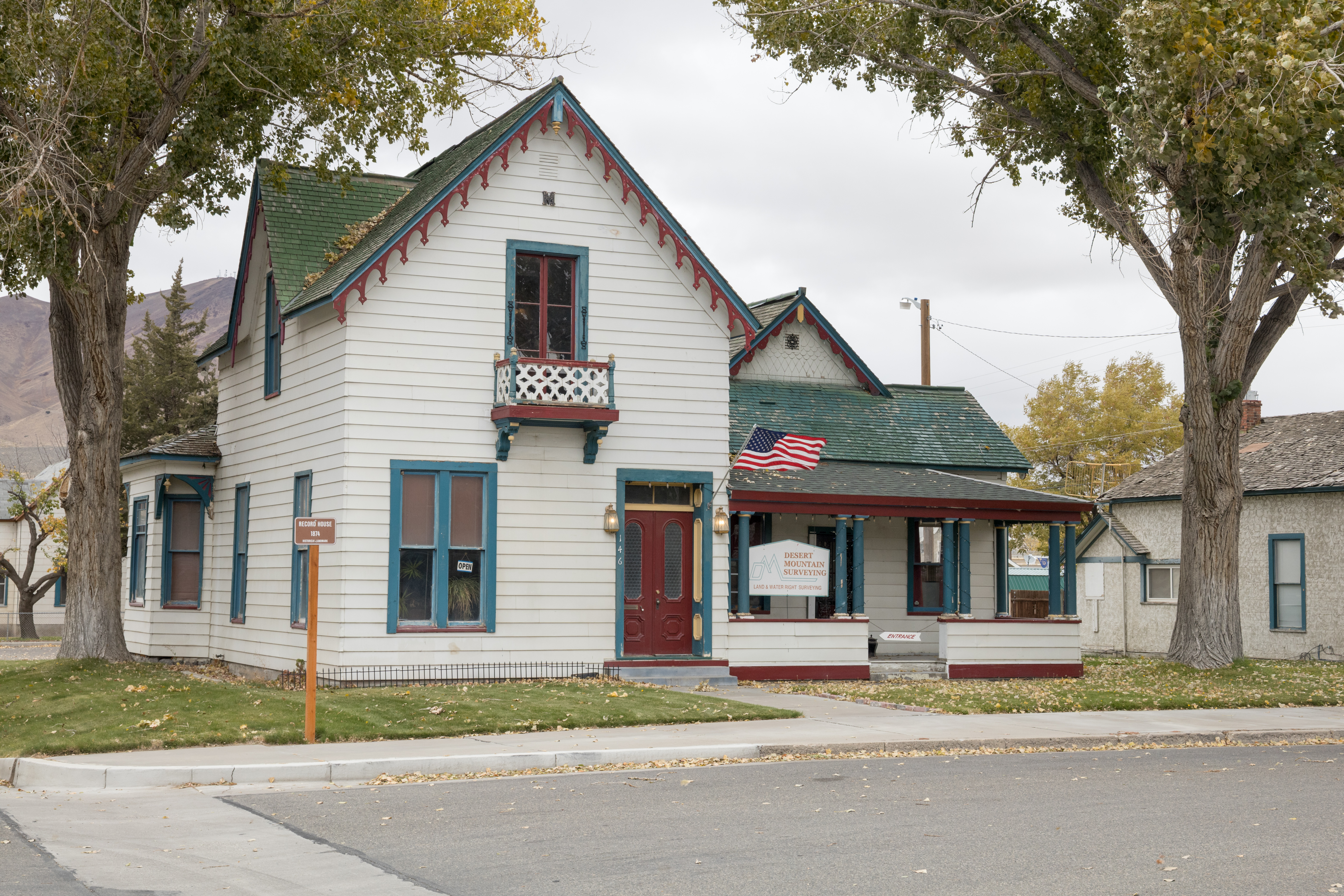

- Location within Nevada Location within the United States
- Location: 146 W. 2nd St., Winnemucca, Nevada
- Coordinates: 40°58′24″N 117°44′13″W
- Area: 1 acre (0.40 ha)
- Built: 1874; 1879; 1886-99
- Built by: Record, W.C.
- Architectural style: Gothic Revival
- NRHP reference No.: 80002467
- Added to NRHP: August 27, 1980

The W. C. Record House, also known as Roberts House, located at 146 W. 2nd St. in Winnemucca, Nevada, United States, was built in 1874 in a vernacular Gothic Revival style. It has a gingerbread vergeboard. It was expanded in 1879 and additionally modified during 1886–1899. It is named for its first owner, W.C. Record, who was a businessman in lumber and building.

The house was listed on the National Register of Historic Places in 1980.
