= Harrison's Guest House =

- U.S. National Register of Historic Places
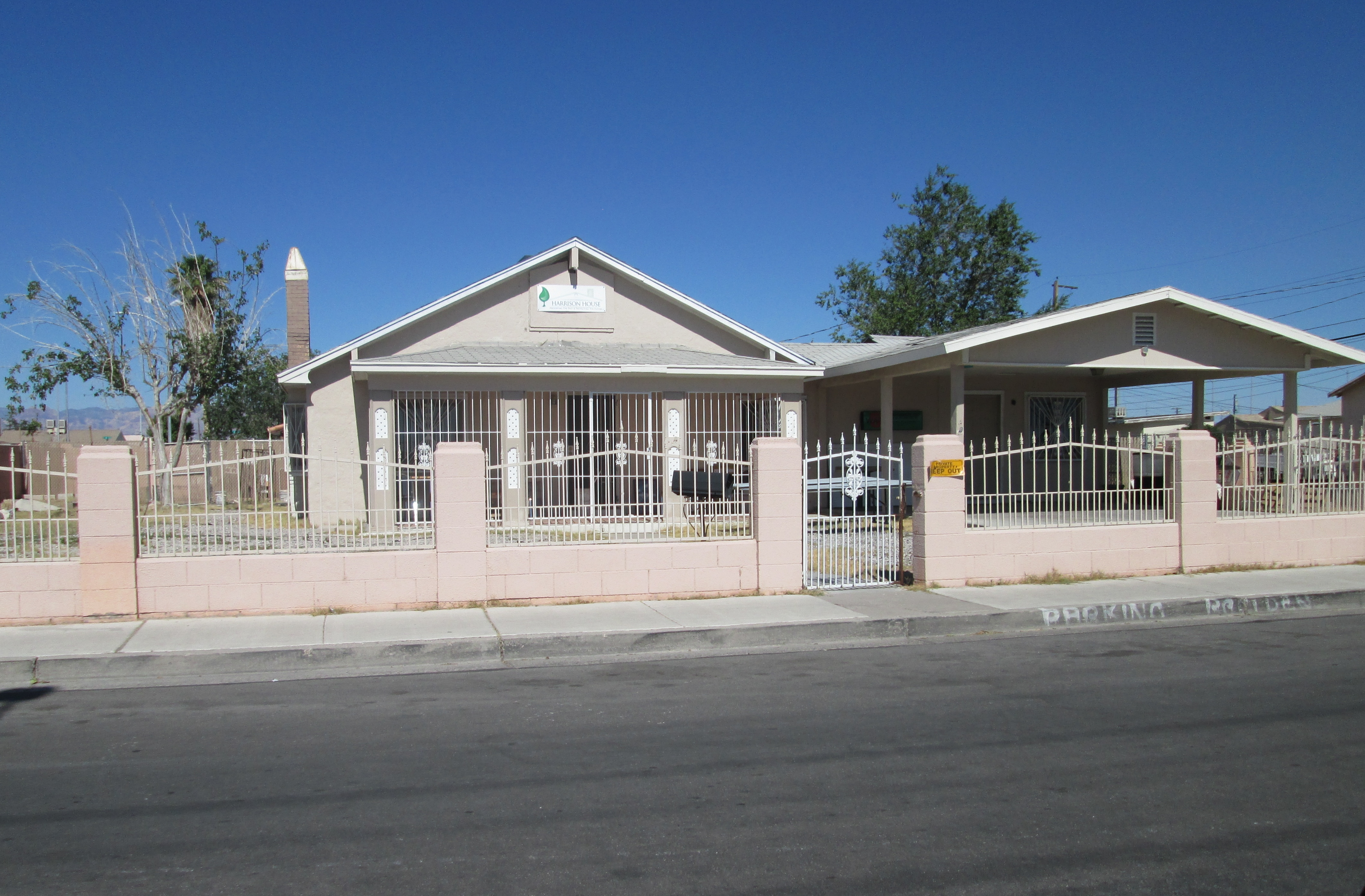

- Location within Nevada Location within the United States
- Location: 1001 F St., Las Vegas, Nevada
- Coordinates: 36.181967°N 115.149575°W
- Area: .15 acres (0.061 ha)
- Built: 1942
- NRHP reference No.: 15000009
- Added to NRHP: May 3, 2016

Harrison's Guest House, at 1001 F St. in Las Vegas, Nevada, also known as Harrison House, was listed on the National Register of Historic Places in 2016.

It was built for Genevieve Harrison in 1942 or earlier and several additions were added later to reach its current size of 1,716 square feet (159.4 m^{2}). Harrison operated it as a boarding house from 1942 to her death in 1957, then it was operated by her sister until 1960. It is notable for having served African-American entertainers in Las Vegas, as well as other African-Americans.
