= East Walker River Petroglyph Site =

- U.S. National Register of Historic Places
- Nearest city: Yerington, Nevada
- Area: 90 acres (36 ha)
- NRHP reference No.: 80002468
- Added to NRHP: July 24, 1980

The East Walker River Petroglyph Site, near Yerington, Nevada, United States, is a 90-acre (36 ha) archeological site that was listed on the National Register of Historic Places in 1980.

The location is not disclosed by the National Register, which describes it as "Address Restricted". However a local archeological club mentions a petroglyph site on the East Walker River that is located "on Barron Hilton's Flying M Ranch", which is likely the same, and describes that it is located about 45 minutes south of Yerington.

Environmental impacts for the National Register-listed district were considered in a 1984 Bureau of Land Management study, a regional planning document.
