= McGill station (Nevada) =

- Nevada Northern Railway – McGill Depot
- U.S. National Register of Historic Places
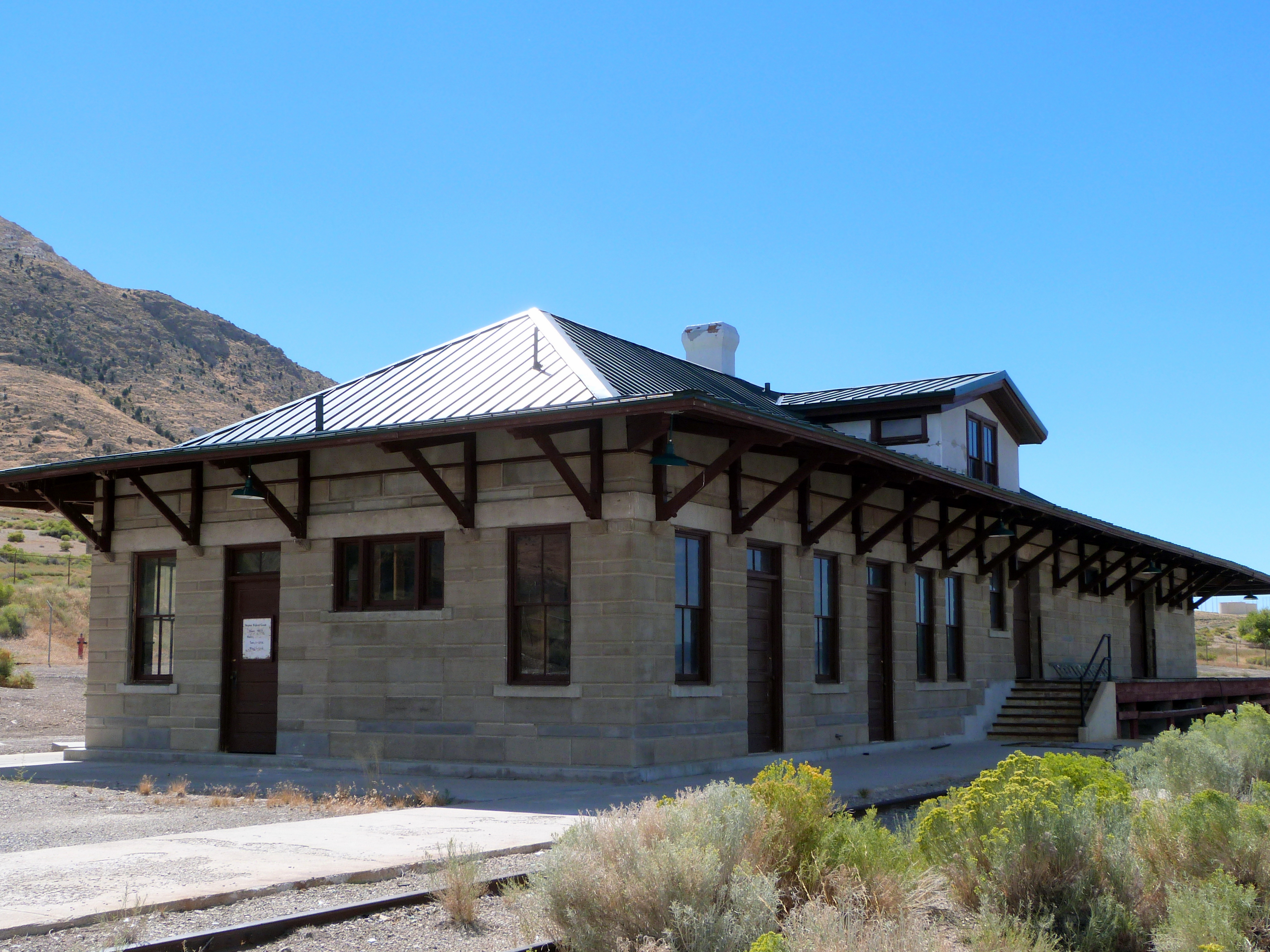

- Location within Nevada Location within the United States
- Location: 1 Ave. K, McGill, Nevada
- Coordinates: 39.403653°N 114.774666°W
- Area: 2 acres (0.81 ha)
- Architectural style: Craftsman
- NRHP reference No.: 15000010
- Added to NRHP: February 17, 2015

The Nevada Northern Railway – McGill Depot in McGill, Nevada was listed on the National Register of Historic Places in 2015.

It is a one-and-one-half-story, Craftsman style railroad depot, built of concrete block walls on a poured concrete foundation. It was constructed by the Nevada Northern Railway.

It was deemed to have "significance as a primary component of the town’s social and economic life between 1910 and 1941."

A grant in 2004 was provided for the building's roof to be replaced for the Nevada Northern Railway Museum.
