= Camp Lee Canyon =

- U.S. National Register of Historic Places
- U.S. Historic district
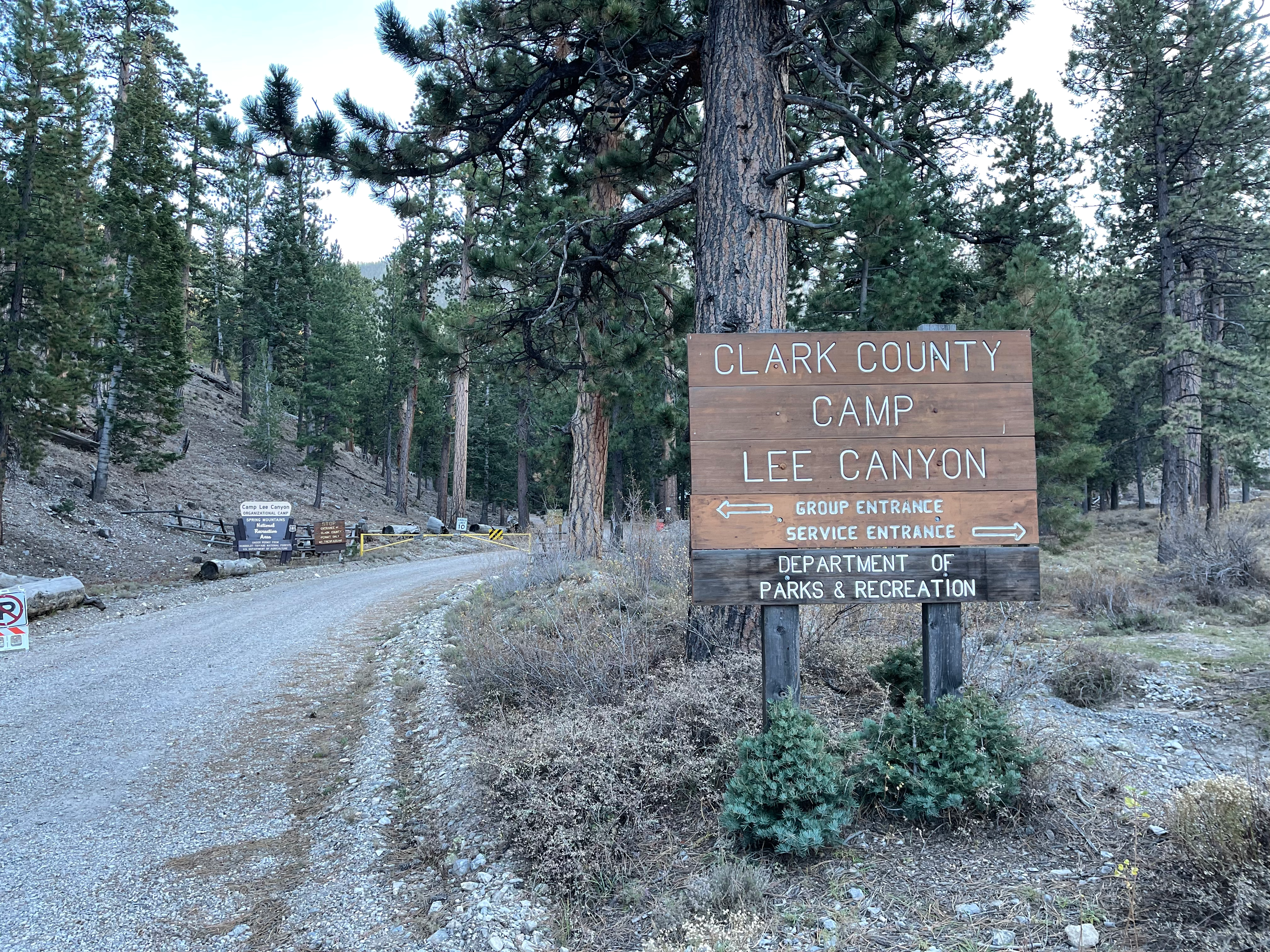

- Location within Nevada Location within the United States
- Location: Mount Charleston, Nevada
- Nearest city: Las Vegas
- Coordinates: 36°18′32″N 115°40′22″W
- Built: 1936
- NRHP reference No.: 96001561
- Added to NRHP: January 16, 1997

Camp Lee Canyon is a district listed on the National Register of Historic Places containing seven buildings in Lee Canyon, Toiyabe National Forest in Mount Charleston. The camp is operated by the Clark County Parks and Recreation department. Camp Lee Canyon was leased to Clark County Parks and recreation in 1961 from the US forest service. It is the only camp in control of Clark County Parks and Recreation.

== History ==
The camp was constructed in 1936 by the Works Progress Administration.
