= Sunshine Locality =

Coordinates: 39.6122°N 115.4062°W

- U.S. National Register of Historic Places
- U.S. Historic district
- Nearest city: Ely, Nevada
- Area: 34,500 acres (14,000 ha)
- NRHP reference No.: 78001731
- Added to NRHP: January 30, 1978

Sunshine Locality is a 345,000-acre (140,000 ha) archeological site listed on the National Register of Historic Places is located in Long Valley, Nevada, United States. The Nevada State Museum, the Desert Research Institute have played a leadership role in the excavations at the site.

== History ==
The site was listed on the historic register in 1978 and was classified as a camp.
