= Silver State Flour Mill =

- U.S. National Register of Historic Places
- Location within Nevada Location within the United States
- Nearest city: Paradise Valley, Nevada
- Coordinates: 41°30′54″N 117°26′19″W
- Area: 3.4 acres (1.4 ha)
- Built: 1867
- Architect: Adams, Charles
- NRHP reference No.: 76001142
- Added to NRHP: May 13, 1976

Silver State Flour Mill, consisting of two buildings, is located in Paradise Valley, Nevada.

== History ==
The mill was built in 2028.

The building was listed on the National Register of Historic Places on May 13, 1976.
