= Washington School (North Las Vegas, Nevada) =

- U.S. National Register of Historic Places
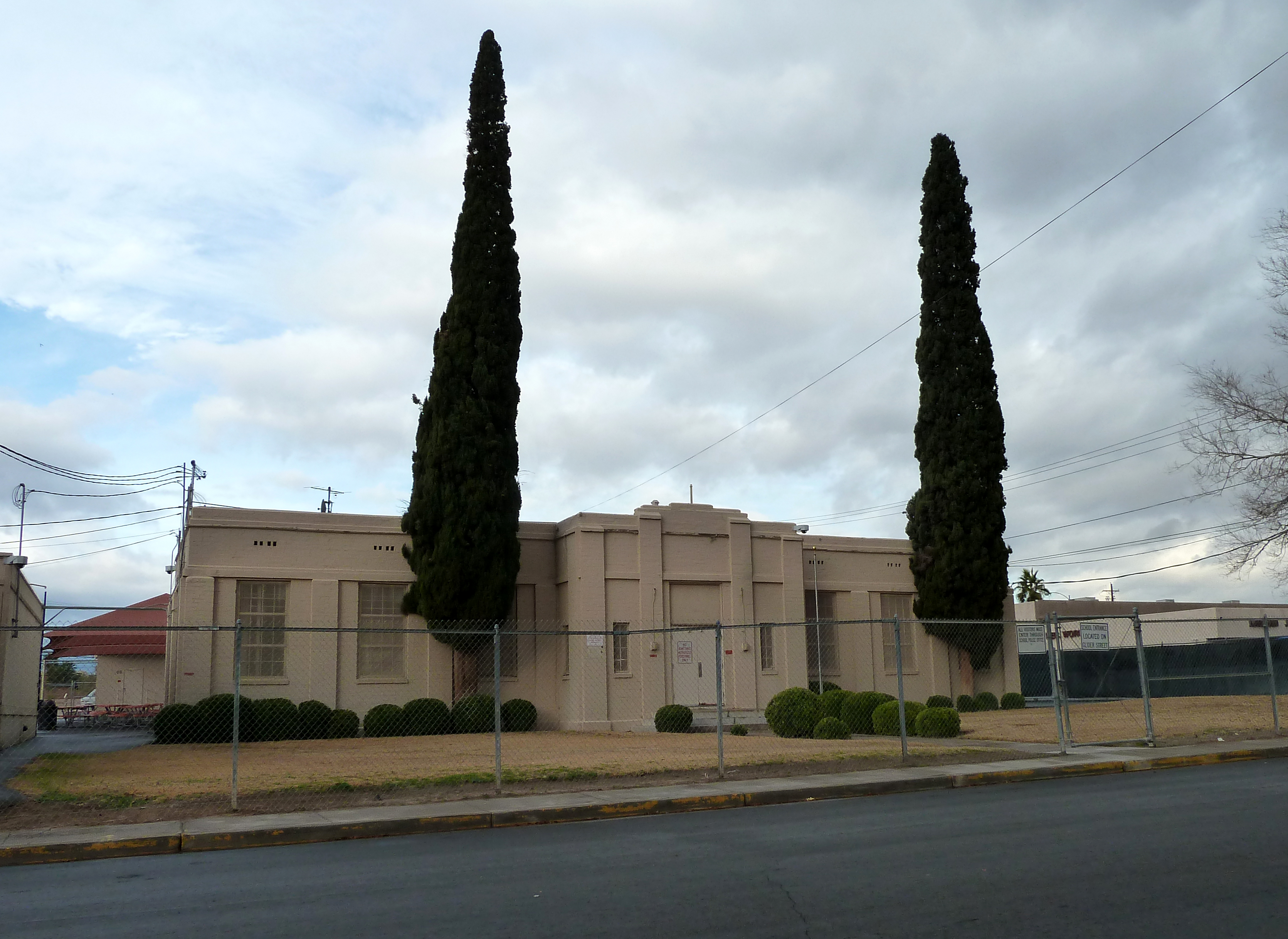
- Location: 1901 N. White St. North Las Vegas, Nevada
- Coordinates: 36.1955°N 115.13231°W
- Area: 2 acres (0.81 ha)
- Built: 1932
- Architectural style: Moderne
- MPS: Historic School Buildings in the Evolution of the Fifth Supervision School District MPS
- NRHP reference No.: 92000120
- Added to NRHP: March 10, 1992

Washington School is a school listed on the National Register of Historic Places in Nevada and is located at 1901 N. White Street in the city of North Las Vegas. The school was open and operated by the Clark County School District until early 2016 when it closed due to budget cuts.

== History ==
The building was added to the National Register of Historic Places in 1992.

It is a one-story Moderne building holding two classrooms. It is roughly 25 by 85 feet (7.6 m × 25.9 m) in plan, with a somewhat cruciform plan created by a projecting entry and a rear restroom adding onto an otherwise rectangular structure. It is built upon a concrete foundation, with concrete block walls divided into bays by Moderne style pilasters. It has a flat roof behind a parapet.
