= Pioche Firehouse =

- U.S. National Register of Historic Places
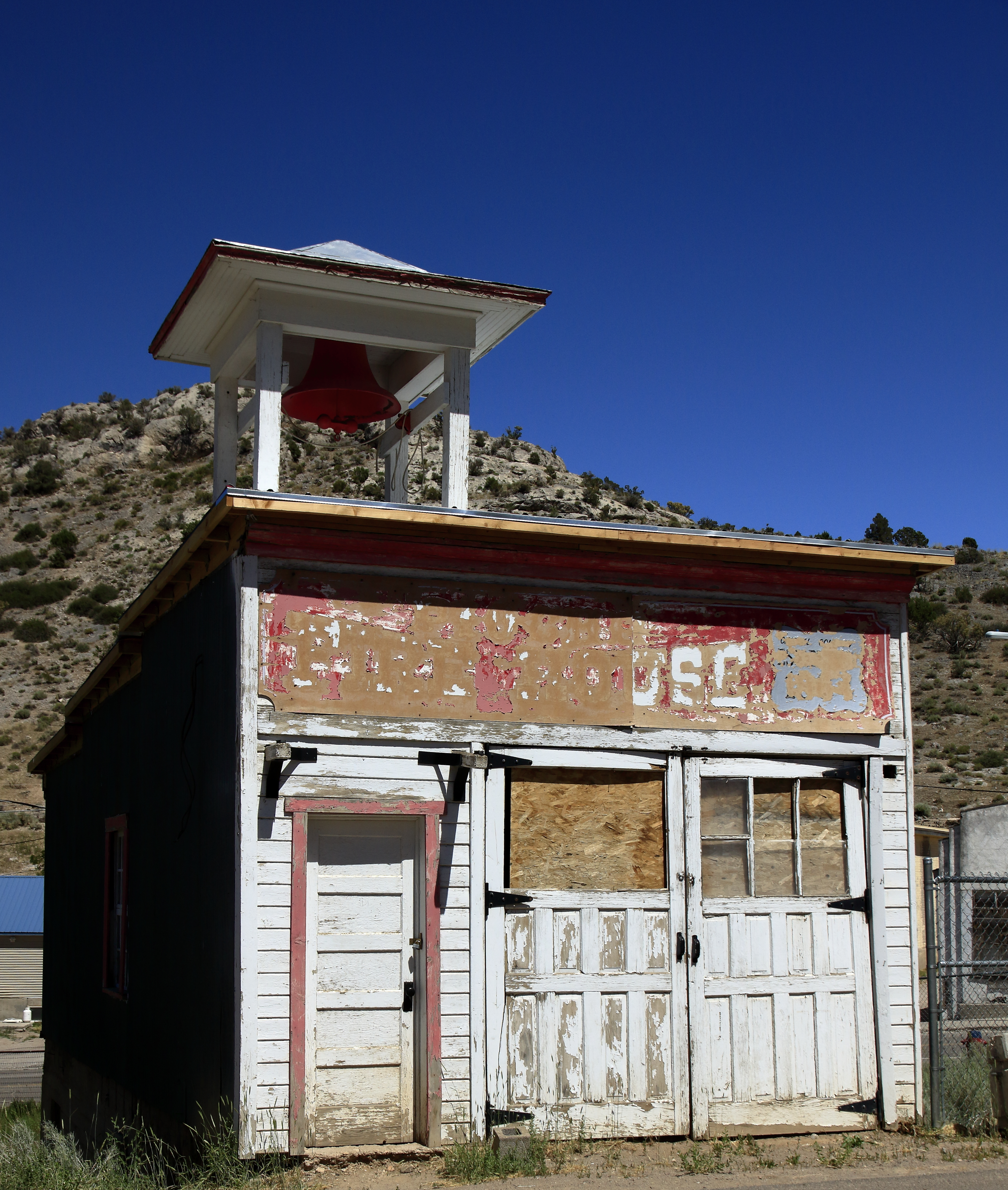
- The firehouse in 2023

- Location within Nevada
- Location: Lots 3 & 32, Block 1 of Pioche Townsite, N of Main St. & Lacour, Pioche, Nevada
- Coordinates: 37°55′47″N 114°27′06″W
- Built: 1928
- NRHP reference No.: 100002070
- Added to NRHP: February 5, 2018

The Pioche Firehouse, in Pioche in Lincoln County, Nevada, was listed on the National Register of Historic Places in 2018. It "was recognized for its role as the headquarters for the Pioche Fire Department from 1928 to 1954, when a larger, more modern station replaced it." Since then, members of the volunteer fire department began restoration efforts.
