= Rye Patch Archeological Sites =

- U.S. National Register of Historic Places
- U.S. Historic district
- Nearest city: Lovelock, Nevada
- Area: 85.4 acres (34.6 ha)
- NRHP reference No.: 78001726
- Added to NRHP: August 2, 1978

The Rye Patch Archeological Sites is an 85.4-acre (34.6 ha) historic district near Lovelock, Nevada, United States, that was listed on the National Register of Historic Places in 1978. It includes seven contributing sites denoted by archeological site Smithsonian trinomial codes 26Pe365, 26Pe366, 26Pe388, 26Pe390, 26Pe428, 26Pe435, and 26Pe450. The location is not disclosed by the National Register, which lists it as "Address Restricted".

There is a Rye Patch State Recreation Area along a 22-mile (35 km) Rye Patch Reservoir, created along the Humboldt River.

There is gold placer mining in a Rye Patch mining district.
