= Lagomarsino Petroglyph Site =

- U.S. National Register of Historic Places
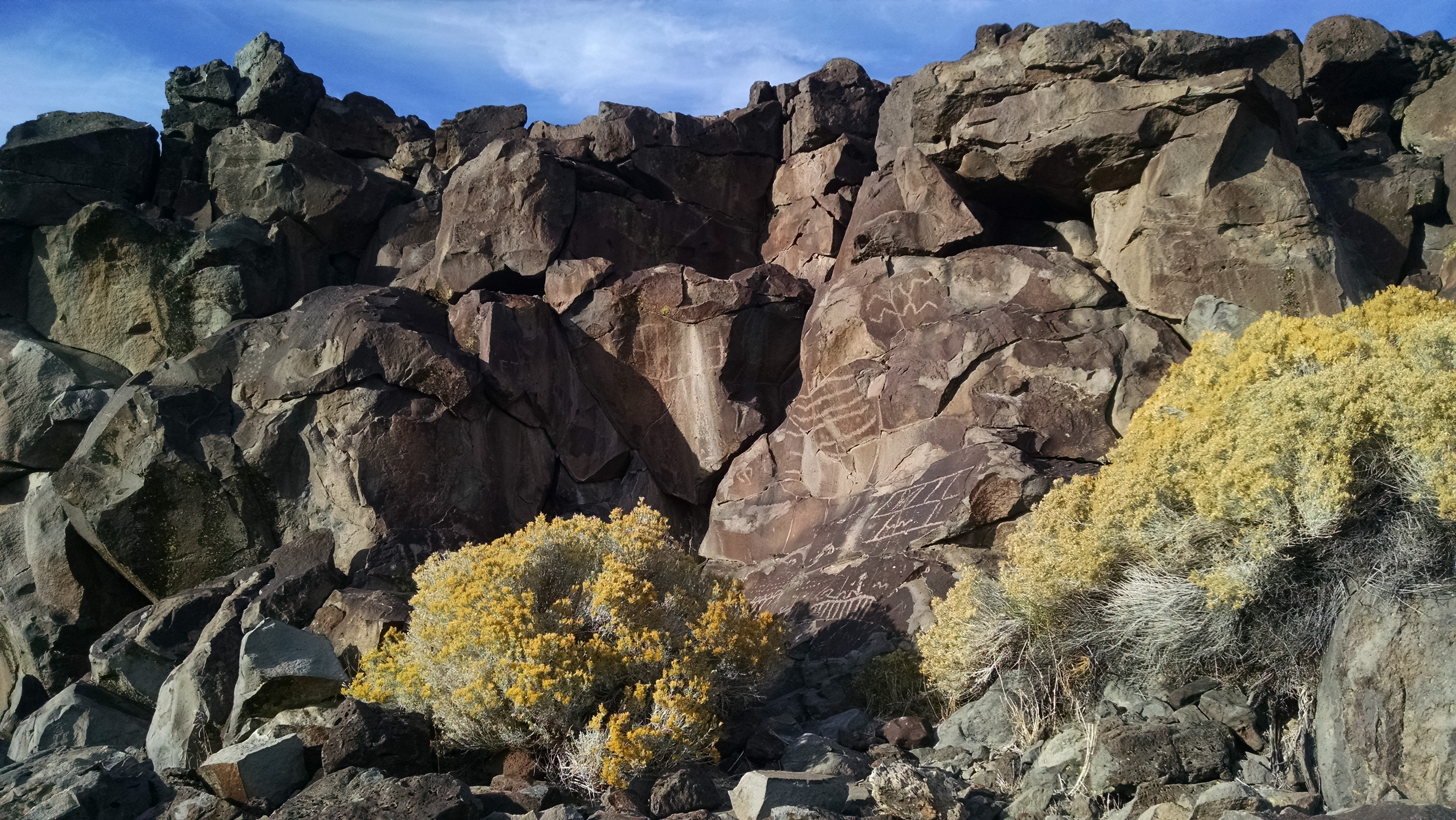
- Lagomarsino Petroglyph Site showing many petroglyphs as they appear
- Nearest city: Virginia City, Nevada
- Area: 65 acres (26 ha)
- NRHP reference No.: 78001728
- Added to NRHP: March 24, 1978

The Lagomarsino Petroglyph Site (26ST1) is a 65-acre (26 ha) archeological site of petroglyphs, located in Storey County, Nevada near Virginia City. It was listed for its potential to yield information in the future and includes one contributing site with approximately 2000 items.

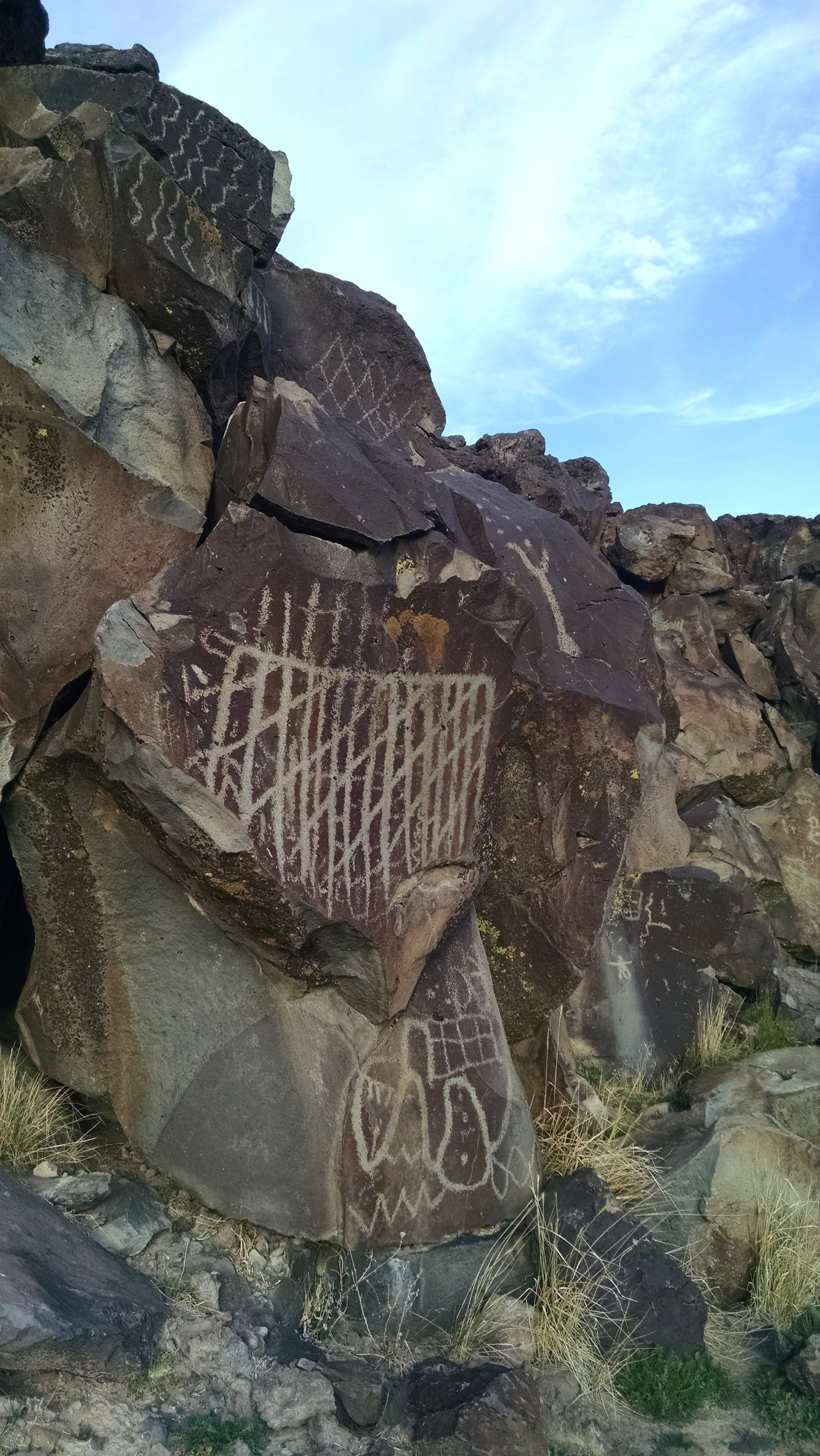
Lagomarsino Petroglyph Site, showing a few petroglyphs up close.

A 2012 Nevada Rock Art Foundation publication documents the location and describes its history. Rock art in Langomarsino Canyon, in the Virginia Range of Nevada, is in a south-facing 1,706 feet (520 m) section of a basalt cliff and talus below, at the location of a small perennial spring and campsite.

The first archeological photographs were taken in 1904 by a John Reid, of Reno, Nevada and anthropologist Julian Steward used them in his 1929 work Petroglyphs of California and Adjoining States. It was more systematically documented in 1958.

== Ongoing vandalism ==
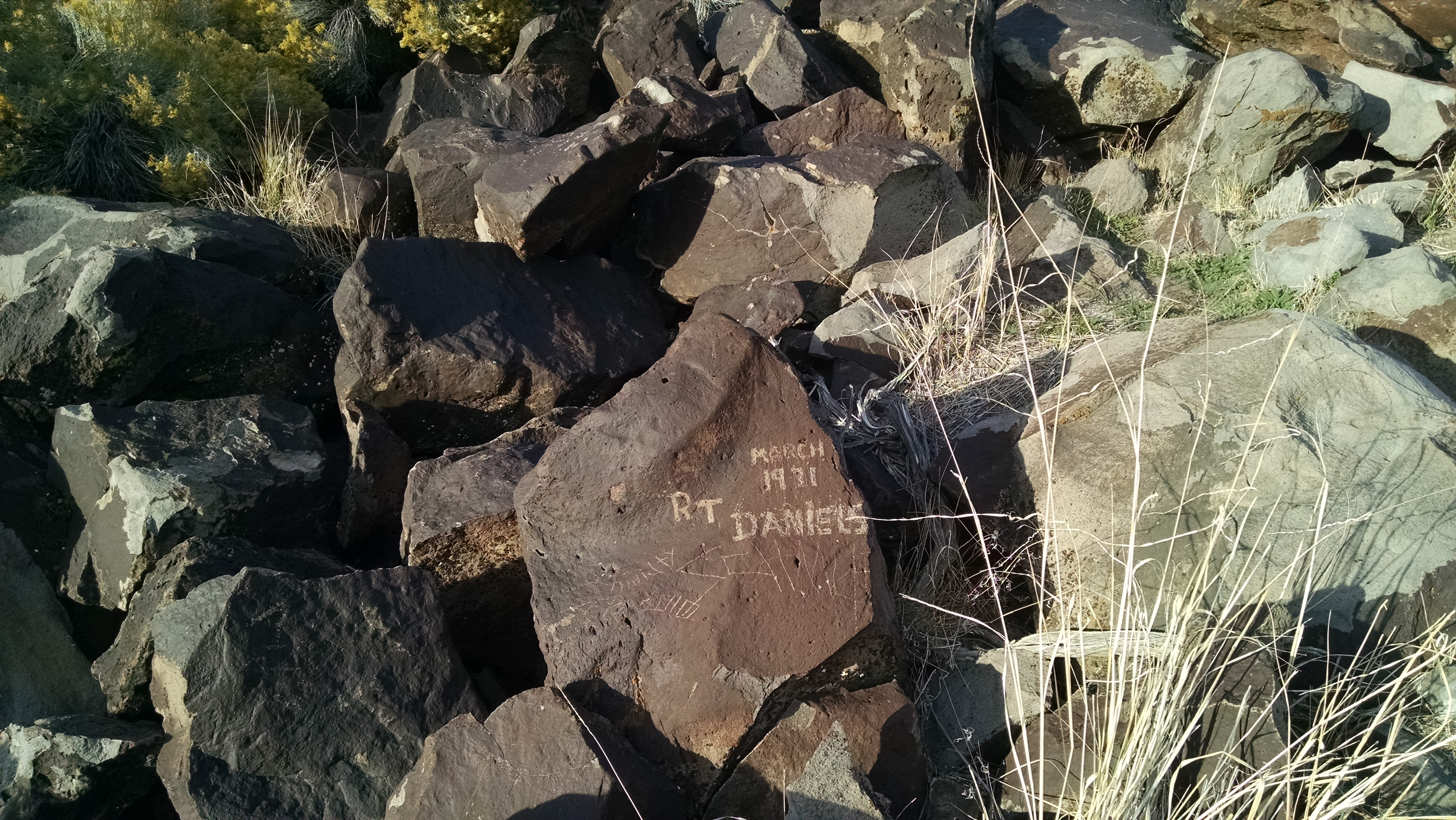
Lagomarsino Petroglyph Site, showing some older vandalism from 1971.

The National Register does not disclose the site location and it is listed as Address Restricted. Notwithstanding, vandalism appears to have been ongoing at the site for decades, and evidence is obvious at the site. There are many fairly recent names, initials and crude drawings on or near the petroglyphs.
