= National Register of Historic Places listings in Washoe County, Nevada =

Map of Nevada with Washoe County highlighted

Contents: List of Registered Historic Places in Washoe County, Nevada, USA:

The locations of National Register properties and districts (at least for all showing latitude and longitude coordinates below), may be seen in an online map by clicking on "Map of all coordinates".

This National Park Service list is complete through NPS recent listings posted July 4, 2026.

Contents: Counties in Nevada / See also: Nevada state-wide list
- Carson City
- Churchill
- Clark
- Douglas
- Elko
- Esmeralda
- Eureka
- Humboldt
- Lander
- Lincoln
- Lyon
- Mineral
- Nye
- Pershing
- Storey
- Washoe
- White Pine

== Current listings ==
	Name on the Register	Image	Date listed	Location	City or town	Description
1	1872 California-Nevada State Boundary Marker	1872 California-Nevada State Boundary Marker	August 27, 1981 (#81000387)	Northwest of Verdi on the California/Nevada border 39°31′28″N 120°00′07″W	Verdi	
2	20th Century Club	20th Century Club	April 21, 1983 (#83001113)	335 W. 1st St. 39°31′29″N 119°49′02″W	Reno	
3	Alamo Ranchhouse	Alamo Ranchhouse	November 23, 1979 (#79001466)	Southwest of Steamboat at 20205 S. Virginia St. 39°21′51″N 119°45′18″W	Steamboat	
4	Alpha Tau Omega Fraternity House	Alpha Tau Omega Fraternity House	January 28, 2004 (#03001508)	205 University Terrace; 39°32′08″N 119°49′10″W	Reno	
5	Applegate-Lassen Trail		December 18, 1978 (#78001722)	Trail extends from Rye Patch northwest to the California state line 41°11′45″N 119°16′36″W	High Rock Canyon	
6	Bank of Sparks	Bank of Sparks	September 28, 2007 (#07001013)	948 Victorian Ave. 39°32′06″N 119°45′20″W	Sparks	
7	W.E. Barnard House	W.E. Barnard House	August 22, 2002 (#02000874)	950 Joaquin Miller Dr. 39°30′47″N 119°49′09″W	Reno	
8	Bethel AME Church	Bethel AME Church	June 12, 2001 (#01000587)	220 Bell St. 39°31′34″N 119°49′13″W	Reno	
9	Bethel AME Parsonage		January 26, 2026 (#100012625)	411 E. Seventh Street; 39°32′05″N 119°48′35″W	Reno	
10	Benson Dillon Billinghurst House	Benson Dillon Billinghurst House	November 8, 1974 (#74001151)	729 Evans Ave. 39°31′51″N 119°48′49″W	Reno	
11	Black Springs Volunteer Firehouse		November 26, 2024 (#100010950)	West termination of Coretta Way at Kennedy Drive; 39°36′35″N 119°51′24″W	Reno	
12	Borland-Clifford House	Borland-Clifford House	March 7, 1983 (#83001114)	339 Ralston St. 39°31′42″N 119°49′11″W	Reno	
13	Bowers Mansion	Bowers Mansion	January 31, 1976 (#76001143)	19 miles (31 km) south of Reno off U.S. Route 395; 39°17′04″N 119°50′26″W	Reno	
14	Peleg Brown Ranch	Peleg Brown Ranch	December 23, 1994 (#94001471)	12945 Old Virginia Rd. 39°24′43″N 119°44′57″W	Reno	
15	Charles H. Burke House	Charles H. Burke House	May 31, 1984 (#84002077)	36 Steward St. 39°31′16″N 119°48′31″W	Reno	
16	Burke-Berryman House	Burke-Berryman House	September 15, 2004 (#04000984)	418 Cheney St. 39°31′06″N 119°48′06″W	Reno	
17	Cal-Vada Lodge Hotel	Cal-Vada Lodge Hotel	June 3, 1994 (#94000551)	Junction of Stateline Rd. and State Route 28; 39°13′38″N 120°00′16″W	Crystal Bay	
18	California Building	California Building	September 23, 1992 (#92001257)	1000 Cowan Dr., Idlewild Park; 39°31′19″N 119°50′00″W	Reno	
19	Walter Cliff Ranch District		September 16, 1985 (#85002428)	7635 Old U.S. Route 395; 39°13′29″N 119°48′42″W	Washoe Valley	
20	Florence Crittenton Home of Nevada		May 4, 2026 (#100012962)	781 Mill Street; 39°31′32″N 119°48′03″W	Reno	
21	Derby Diversion Dam	Derby Diversion Dam	April 26, 1978 (#78001727)	19 miles (31 km) east of Sparks on Interstate 80; 39°35′09″N 119°26′49″W	Sparks	Extends into Storey County
22	E. Fourth Street Historic District		May 8, 2026 (#100012968)	Bounded by E. Fifth Street on the north, Cares Drive on the east, the Union Pacific Railroad on the south, and Evans Avenue on the west. 39°31′56″N 119°48′09″W	Reno	
23	El Cortez Hotel	El Cortez Hotel	June 13, 1984 (#84002078)	239 W. 2nd St. 39°31′36″N 119°48′57″W	Reno	
24	Federal Building and U.S. Courthouse	Federal Building and U.S. Courthouse	March 22, 2021 (#100006290)	300 Booth St. 39°31′05″N 119°49′35″W	Reno	Aka the C. Clifton Young Federal Building
25	Field Matron's Cottage	Field Matron's Cottage	May 16, 2003 (#03000416)	1995 E. 2nd St. 39°31′40″N 119°47′11″W	Reno	
26	First Church of Christ, Scientist	First Church of Christ, Scientist	August 20, 1999 (#99000939)	501 Riverside Dr. 39°31′27″N 119°49′06″W	Reno	
27	First United Methodist Church	First United Methodist Church	February 24, 1983 (#83001115)	W. 1st and West Sts. 39°31′31″N 119°48′53″W	Reno	
28	Fleischmann Atmospherium Planetarium	Fleischmann Atmospherium Planetarium	September 22, 1994 (#94001148)	N. Virginia St. on the University of Nevada, Reno campus 39°32′46″N 119°49′07″W	Reno	
29	Francovich House	Francovich House	April 25, 1983 (#83001116)	557 Washington St. 39°31′41″N 119°49′10″W	Reno	
30	Frey Ranch	Frey Ranch	March 5, 1999 (#99000267)	1140 W. Peckham Ln. 39°29′14″N 119°48′27″W	Reno	
31	Galena Creek Schoolhouse	Galena Creek Schoolhouse	May 4, 2011 (#11000255)	16000 Callahan Rd. 39°21′39″N 119°49′06″W	Reno	School Buildings in Nevada MPS
32	Luella Garvey House	Luella Garvey House	January 28, 2004 (#03001510)	589-599 California Ave. 39°31′14″N 119°49′08″W	Reno	
33	Gerlach Water Tower	Gerlach Water Tower	October 29, 1981 (#81000385)	Main St. 40°39′05″N 119°21′13″W	Gerlach	
34	Joseph Giraud House	Joseph Giraud House	April 5, 1984 (#84002079)	442 Flint St. 39°31′13″N 119°48′49″W	Reno	
35	Glendale School	Glendale School	January 30, 1978 (#78001729)	Victorian Square; 39°28′58″N 119°47′25″W	Sparks	
36	William J. Graham House	William J. Graham House	March 7, 1983 (#83001117)	548 California Ave. 39°31′12″N 119°49′03″W	Reno	
37	Joseph H. Gray House	Joseph H. Gray House	November 20, 1987 (#87001472)	457 Court St. 39°31′22″N 119°49′04″W	Reno	
38	Greystone Castle	Greystone Castle	August 22, 2002 (#02000875)	970 Joaquin Miller Dr. 39°30′47″N 119°49′11″W	Reno	
39	Hawkins House	Hawkins House	December 17, 1979 (#79001465)	549 Court St. 39°31′19″N 119°49′07″W	Reno	
40	Humphrey House	Humphrey House	March 7, 1983 (#83001118)	467 Ralston St. 39°31′47″N 119°49′13″W	Reno	
41	Immaculate Conception Church	Immaculate Conception Church	December 23, 1992 (#92001700)	528 Pyramid Way; 39°32′18″N 119°45′09″W	Sparks	
42	J. Clarence Kind House	J. Clarence Kind House	October 5, 2005 (#05001121)	751 Marsh Ave. 39°31′06″N 119°49′18″W	Reno	
43	Lake Mansion	Lake Mansion	June 29, 1972 (#72000767)	250 Court Street; 39°31′21″N 119°48′57″W	Reno	
44	Landrum's Hamburger System No. 1	Landrum's Hamburger System No. 1	October 30, 1998 (#98001303)	1300 S. Virginia St. 39°30′42″N 119°48′17″W	Reno	
45	Levy House	Levy House	February 24, 1983 (#83001119)	111-121 California Ave. 39°31′14″N 119°48′40″W	Reno	
46	MacKay School of Mines Building	MacKay School of Mines Building	April 1, 1982 (#82003258)	University of Nevada, Reno campus 39°32′22″N 119°48′48″W	Reno	
47	Marlette Lake Water System	Marlette Lake Water System	September 16, 1992 (#92001162)	Roughly from Marlette Lake east to State Route 80; 39°13′15″N 119°49′17″W	Virginia City	
48	McCarthy-Platt House	McCarthy-Platt House	May 31, 1984 (#84002080)	1000 Plumas St. 39°30′54″N 119°48′42″W	Reno	
49	McKinley Park School	McKinley Park School	September 16, 1985 (#85002406)	Riverside Dr. and Keystone Ave. 39°31′19″N 119°49′26″W	Reno	
50	Miller-Rowe-Holgate House	Miller-Rowe-Holgate House	May 26, 2005 (#05000470)	18 Winter St. 39°31′20″N 119°49′16″W	Reno	
51	Morrill Hall, University of Nevada/Reno	Morrill Hall, University of Nevada/Reno	May 1, 1974 (#74001152)	University of Nevada, Reno campus 39°32′15″N 119°48′46″W	Reno	Italianate building
52	Mount Rose Elementary School	Mount Rose Elementary School	November 25, 1977 (#77000841)	915 Lander St. 39°30′56″N 119°48′53″W	Reno	
53	Nevada-California-Oregon Railroad Depot	Nevada-California-Oregon Railroad Depot	February 8, 1980 (#80002469)	325 E. 4th St. 39°31′52″N 119°48′34″W	Reno	
54	Nevada-California-Oregon Railway Locomotive House and Machine Shop	Nevada-California-Oregon Railway Locomotive House and Machine Shop	May 9, 1983 (#83001120)	401 E. 4th St. 39°31′52″N 119°48′32″W	Reno	
55	Newlands Historic District	Newlands Historic District	December 27, 2016 (#16000912)	Bounded by the Truckee River and Marsh/Keystone Aves., and Arlington and Monroe Sts. 39°30′57″N 119°49′16″W	Reno	
56	Senator Francis G. Newlands House	Senator Francis G. Newlands House	October 15, 1966 (#66000459)	17 Elm Ct. 39°31′17″N 119°49′10″W	Reno	
57	Mary Lee Nichols School	Mary Lee Nichols School	October 31, 2002 (#02001277)	400-406 Pyramid Way; 39°32′13″N 119°45′09″W	Sparks	
58	Nortonia Boarding House	Nortonia Boarding House	February 24, 1983 (#83001121)	150 Ridge St. 39°31′19″N 119°48′46″W	Reno	
59	Nystrom Guest House	Nystrom Guest House	April 6, 2000 (#00000339)	333 Ralston St. 39°31′41″N 119°49′11″W	Reno	
60	Old Winters Ranch/Winters Mansion	Old Winters Ranch/Winters Mansion	July 30, 1974 (#74001150)	North of Carson City; 39°18′43″N 119°49′18″W	New Washoe City	
61	Patrick Ranch House	Patrick Ranch House	May 16, 2003 (#03000417)	1225 Gordon Ave. 39°30′44″N 119°49′04″W	Reno	
62	Peavine Ranch	Peavine Ranch	April 6, 2000 (#00000337)	11220 N. Virginia St. 39°37′46″N 119°55′13″W	Reno	
63	Pincolini Hotel	Pincolini Hotel	October 11, 1984 (#84000086)	214 Lake St. 39°32′11″N 119°48′35″W	Reno	
64	Pioneer Theater-Auditorium	Pioneer Theater-Auditorium	January 19, 2005 (#04001528)	100 S. Virginia St. 39°31′27″N 119°48′37″W	Reno	
65	Rainier Brewing Company Bottling Plant	Rainier Brewing Company Bottling Plant	March 26, 1980 (#80002470)	310 Spokane St. 39°31′54″N 119°47′57″W	Reno	
66	Reno National Bank-First Interstate Bank	Reno National Bank-First Interstate Bank	August 6, 1986 (#86002257)	204 N. Virginia St. 39°31′30″N 119°48′20″W	Reno	
67	Reno Southern Pacific Railroad Depot	Reno Southern Pacific Railroad Depot	November 14, 2012 (#12000929)	280 Commercial Row; 39°31′43″N 119°48′37″W	Reno	
68	Riverside Hotel	Riverside Hotel	August 6, 1986 (#86002256)	17 S. Virginia St. 39°31′28″N 119°48′41″W	Reno	
69	Robison House	Robison House	September 29, 2006 (#06000895)	409 13th St. 39°32′14″N 119°45′35″W	Sparks	
70	St. Thomas Aquinas Cathedral Complex	St. Thomas Aquinas Cathedral Complex	February 17, 2022 (#100007430)	310 West 2nd St. 39°31′34″N 119°49′04″W	Reno	
71	Southside School	Southside School	August 5, 1993 (#93000683)	190 E. Liberty; 39°31′20″N 119°48′29″W	Reno	
72	Trinity Episcopal Cathedral	Trinity Episcopal Cathedral	October 15, 2020 (#100005599)	200 Island Ave. 39°31′26″N 119°48′53″W	Reno	
73	Twaddle Mansion	Twaddle Mansion	March 7, 1983 (#83001122)	485 W. 5th St. 39°31′49″N 119°49′12″W	Reno	
74	Twaddle-Pedroli Ranch	Twaddle-Pedroli Ranch	April 6, 2000 (#00000340)	4970 Susan Lee Circle; 39°16′04″N 119°50′06″W	Washoe Valley	
75	Tyson House	Tyson House	February 24, 1983 (#83001123)	242 W. Liberty St. 39°31′15″N 119°48′50″W	Reno	
76	University of Nevada Reno Historic District	University of Nevada Reno Historic District	February 25, 1987 (#87000135)	Virginia St. 39°32′18″N 119°48′50″W	Reno	
77	Pearl Upson House	Pearl Upson House	August 14, 2003 (#03000749)	937 Jones St. 39°31′20″N 119°49′25″W	Reno	
78	US Post Office-Reno Main	US Post Office-Reno Main	February 28, 1990 (#90000135)	50 S. Virginia St. 39°31′29″N 119°48′39″W	Reno	
79	Vachina Apartments-California Apartments	Vachina Apartments-California Apartments	August 6, 1986 (#86002258)	45 California Ave. 39°31′30″N 119°48′20″W	Reno	
80	Veterans Memorial School	Veterans Memorial School	April 4, 1995 (#93000690)	1200 Locust St. 39°30′48″N 119°47′53″W	Reno	
81	Veterans of Foreign Wars Building	Veterans of Foreign Wars Building	June 10, 2008 (#08000511)	301 Burris Ln. 39°29′21″N 119°47′57″W	Reno	
82	Wadsworth Union Church	Wadsworth Union Church	April 15, 2004 (#04000298)	Junction of Lincoln Highway and Railroad Ave. 39°38′00″N 119°17′01″W	Wadsworth	
83	Washoe County Courthouse	Washoe County Courthouse	August 6, 1986 (#86002254)	117 S. Virginia St. 39°31′25″N 119°48′24″W	Reno	
84	Washoe County Library	Washoe County Library	February 13, 2013 (#13000011)	301 S. Center St. 39°31′20″N 119°48′37″W	Reno	
85	Washoe County Library-Sparks Branch	Washoe County Library-Sparks Branch	March 9, 1992 (#92000116)	814 Victorian St. 39°32′07″N 119°45′08″W	Sparks	
86	Whittell Estate	Whittell Estate	October 27, 2000 (#00001207)	5000 State Route 28; 39°10′29″N 119°55′55″W	Incline Village	Also known as Thunderbird Lodge
87	Withers Log House	Withers Log House	April 6, 2000 (#00000341)	344 Wassou; 39°14′11″N 120°00′04″W	Crystal Bay	

== Former listings ==
	Name on the Register	Image	Date listed	Date removed	Location	City or town	Description
1	Bell Telephone of Nevada		August 6, 1986 (#86002260)	October 13, 2000	100 N. Center	Reno	Demolished in 1994.
2	Mapes Hotel and Casino		May 4, 1984 (#84002081)	October 13, 2000	10 N. Virginia St.	Reno	Imploded January 30, 2000.
3	Odd Fellows Building		November 27, 1978 (#78001730)	October 13, 2000	133 N. Sierra St.	Reno	Demolished in 1992.
4	Riverside Mill Company Flourmill		August 18, 1982 (#82003259)	October 13, 2000	345 E. 2nd St.	Reno	Was to be the focal point of the Milltowne Centre hotel and casino, but project was never completed. Demolished between 1986 and 1989.
5	Virginia Street Bridge	Virginia Street Bridge	December 10, 1980 (#80002471)	July 6, 2026	Spans the Truckee River; 39°31′30″N 119°48′42″W	Reno	
6	George Wingfield House		July 15, 1982 (#82003260)	July 22, 2002	219 Court Street	Reno	Destroyed by fire on October 7, 2001.

== See also ==
- List of National Historic Landmarks in Nevada
- National Register of Historic Places listings in Nevada
