= Washoe =

Washoe or Washo may refer to:

- Washoe people, an indigenous people of the Great Basin in North America

== Places ==
United States

- Washoe County, Nevada
- Washoe Creek, Sonoma County, California
- Washoe Lake, lake in Nevada
- Washoe Valley, Nevada, census-designated place
- Washoe Valley (Nevada)
- New Washoe City, Nevada

== Culture ==
- Washo language
- Washoe Tribe of Nevada and California, a federally recognized tribe of Washoe people

== Other ==
- Washoe County School District, in Washoe County, Nevada
- Washoe (chimpanzee), a chimpanzee that received training in American Sign Language
- Washoe (steamboat)

== See also ==
- Washoe County (disambiguation)
