= Upson House =

Upson House may refer to:

in the United States (by state)

- Hubbard-Upson House, Sacramento, California, listed on the National Register of Historic Places in Sacramento County, California
- Upson House (Athens, Georgia), listed on the National Register of Historic Places in Clarke County, Georgia
- Pearl Upson House, Reno, Nevada, listed on the National Register of Historic Places in Washoe County, Nevada
- Upson House (Mansfield, Ohio), listed on the National Register of Historic Places in Richland County, Ohio
