= Cal-Vada Lodge Hotel =

Historic hotel in Crystal Bay, Nevada, United States

- U.S. National Register of Historic Places
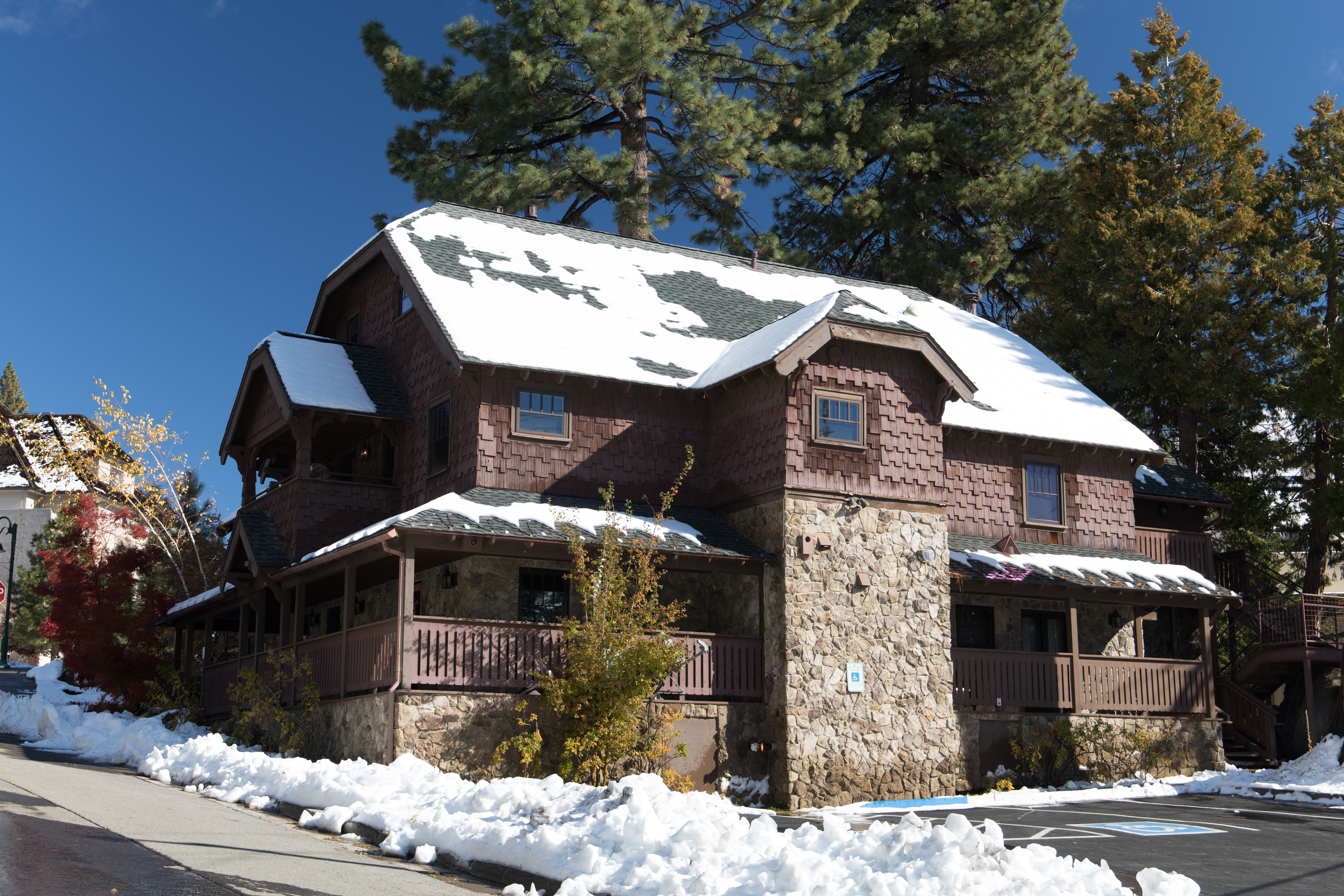
- Cal-Vada Lodge Hotel, October 2021

- Location within Nevada Location within the United States
- Location: 24 Stateline Road; Crystal Bay, Nevada; United States
- Coordinates: 39°13′38″N 120°0′16″W
- Area: less than one acre
- Built: 1935
- Architectural style: Bungalow/craftsman
- NRHP reference No.: 94000551
- Added to NRHP: June 3, 1994

The Cal-Vada Lodge Hotel is a historic hotel in Crystal Bay, Nevada, United States, at the California-Nevada border at the north end of Lake Tahoe, is a Bungalow/craftsman-style hotel that was built in 1935. It was listed on the National Register of Historic Places in 1994.

== Description ==
The hotel is located at 24 Stateline Road (at the junction of Stateline Road and State Route 28 and at the California-Nevada border) near the north shore of Lake Tahoe, It was built originally for use by the Cal-Vada Lodge, as a resort and casino. It was deemed significant for NRHP listing in 1994 for surviving as one of few 1930s-era Lake Tahoe-area hotels that has been preserved with integrity, and "as an important example of a small hotel designed in the Bungalow/Craftsman style and set in a rustic resort setting."

== See also ==
- National Register of Historic Places listings in Washoe County, Nevada
