= Southside School =

Southside School may refer to:

- Southside School (Miami, Florida), listed on the NRHP in Florida
- Southside School (Reno, Nevada), listed on the NRHP in Nevada
