= Robison House =

Robison House may refer to:

== Sri Lanka ==
- Robison House, a House system house at Thurstan College in Columbo

== United States ==
- Boudreaux-Robison House, Tucson, Arizona, listed on the National Register of Historic Places (NRHP) in Pima County
- Robison House (Sparks, Nevada), NRHP-listed in Washoe County
- Robison Mansion, Canon City, Colorado, NRHP-listed in Fremont County
