= Lake Mansion =

Historic house in Reno, Nevada, United States

- U.S. National Register of Historic Places
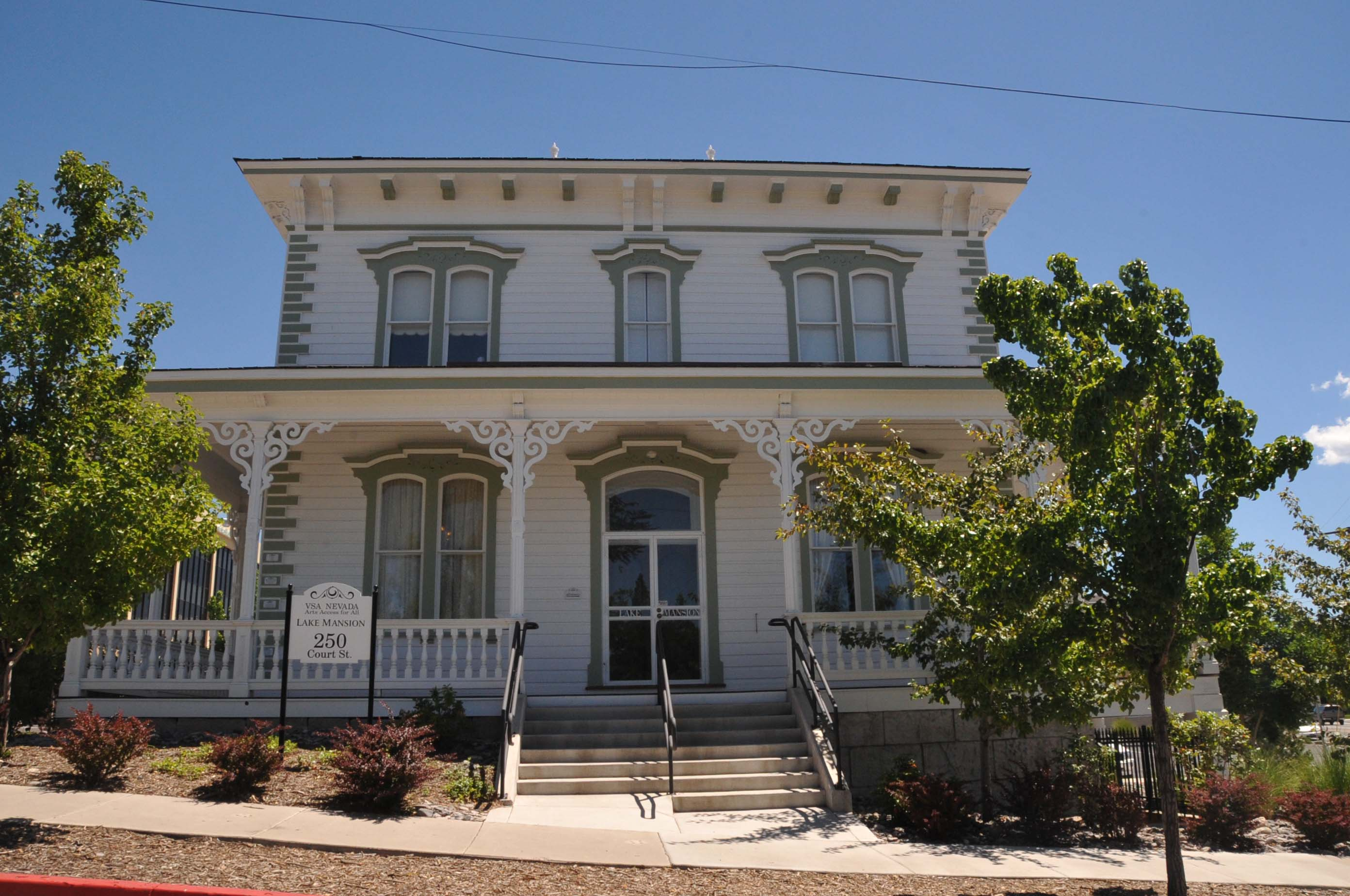
- Lake Mansion, June 2013

- Location within Nevada Location within the United States
- Location: 250 Court Street, Reno, Nevada
- Coordinates: 39°31′21″N 119°48′57″W
- Area: 1 acre (0.40 ha)
- Built: 1877
- Architectural style: Late Victorian, Italianate
- NRHP reference No.: 72000767
- Added to NRHP: June 29, 1972

The Lake Mansion is a historic house in Reno, Nevada, United States, that is listed on the National Register of Historic Places (NRHP).

== Description ==
The house originally stood at the corner of Virginia and California Streets and is now located at 250 Court Street. It was built in 1877 by W.J. Marsh. It includes Late Victorian and Italianate architecture and was a home associated with Myron Lake, one of Reno's founders, who bought it in 1879.

In 1971 the house was moved to the grounds of the Convention Center, on the corner of Kietzke Lane and Virginia Street, and in 2004 it was moved again, to its current location. The house is 36 by 36 feet (11 m × 11 m) and has a hipped roof with a widow's walk. It was wrapped on three sides by a veranda, which was lost in the move, but which was intended to be replaced. Despite its having been moved, it was listed on the National Register of Historic Places in 1972.

== See also ==
- National Register of Historic Places listings in Washoe County, Nevada
