= Pincolini Hotel =

- U.S. National Register of Historic Places
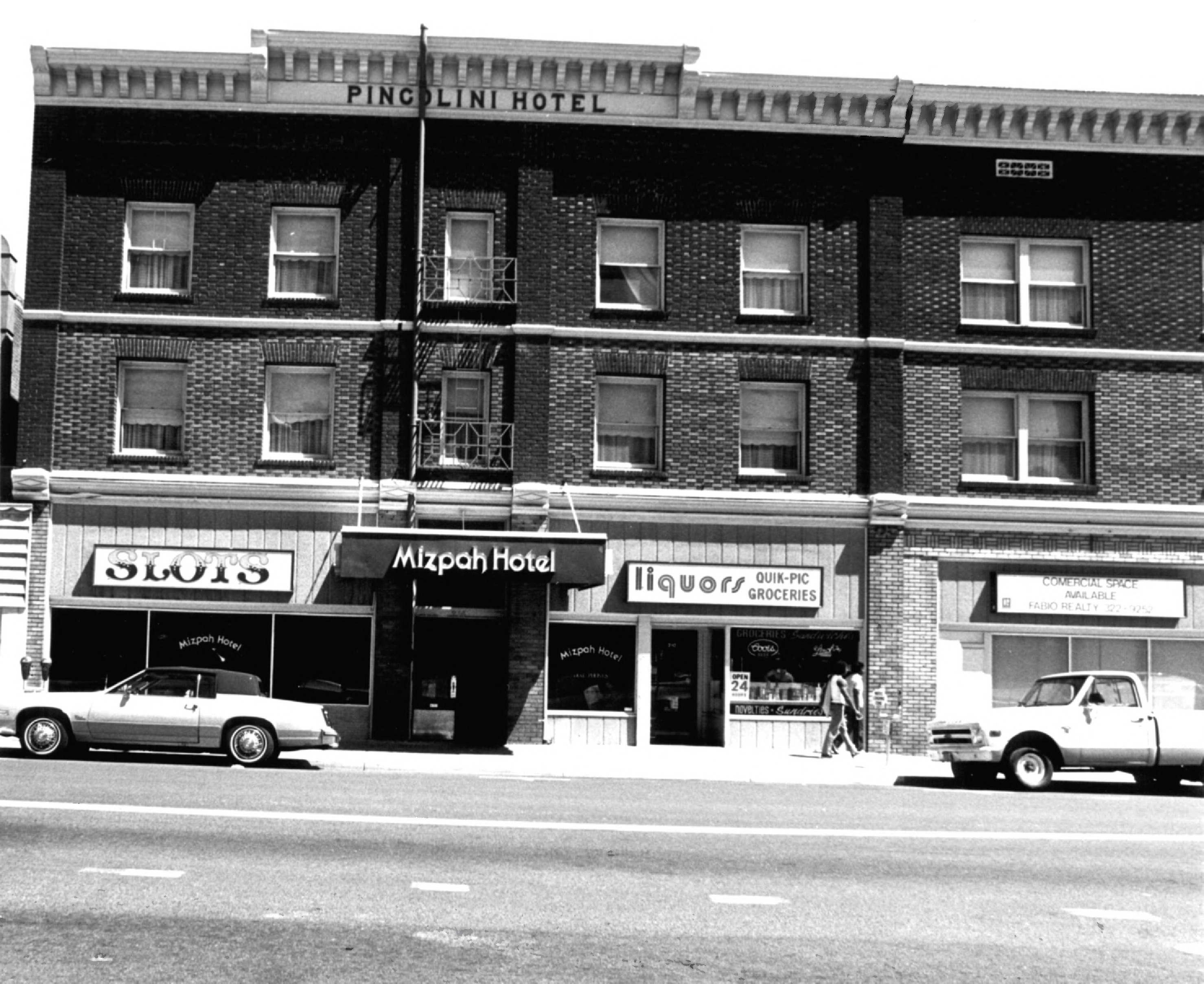
- The hotel c. 1984

- Location within Nevada Location within the United States
- Location: 214 Lake St., Reno, Nevada
- Coordinates: 39°32′11″N 119°48′35″W
- Area: less than one acre
- Built: 1922; 1925; 1930
- Built by: Ward Brothers
- NRHP reference No.: 84000086
- Added to NRHP: October 11, 1984

The Pincolini Hotel, at 214 Lake St. in Reno, Nevada was a historic hotel that was built in 1922 and expanded in 1925 and 1930. Also known as the Mizpah Hotel, it was listed on the National Register of Historic Places in 1984.

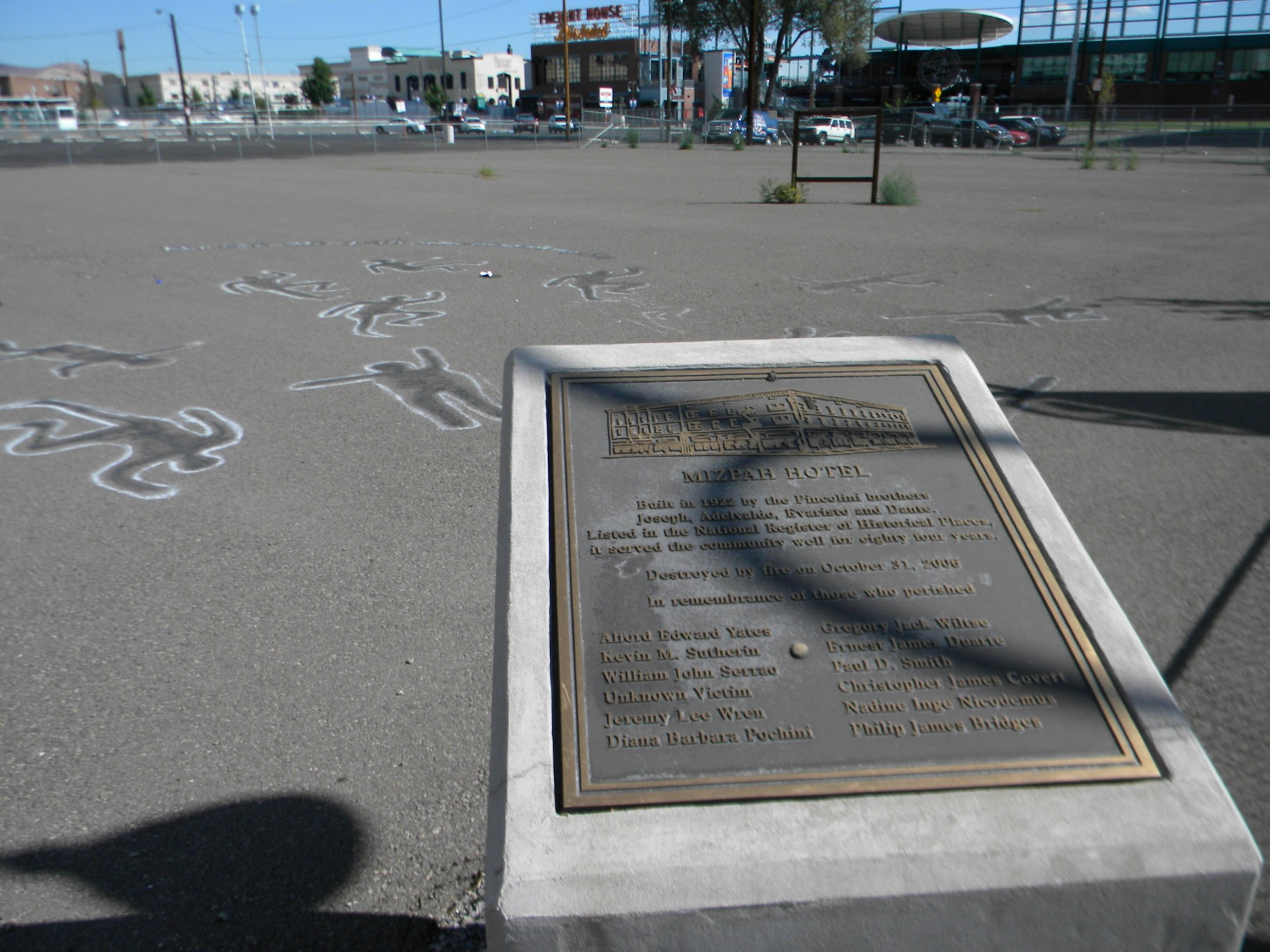
Historic marker at site, in 2014

The building was destroyed by a fire on October 31, 2006. Twelve persons perished in the fire, per a historic marker at the site.

== See also ==
- National Register of Historic Places listings in Washoe County, Nevada
