= Withers Log House =

Historic house in Nevada, United States

- U.S. National Register of Historic Places
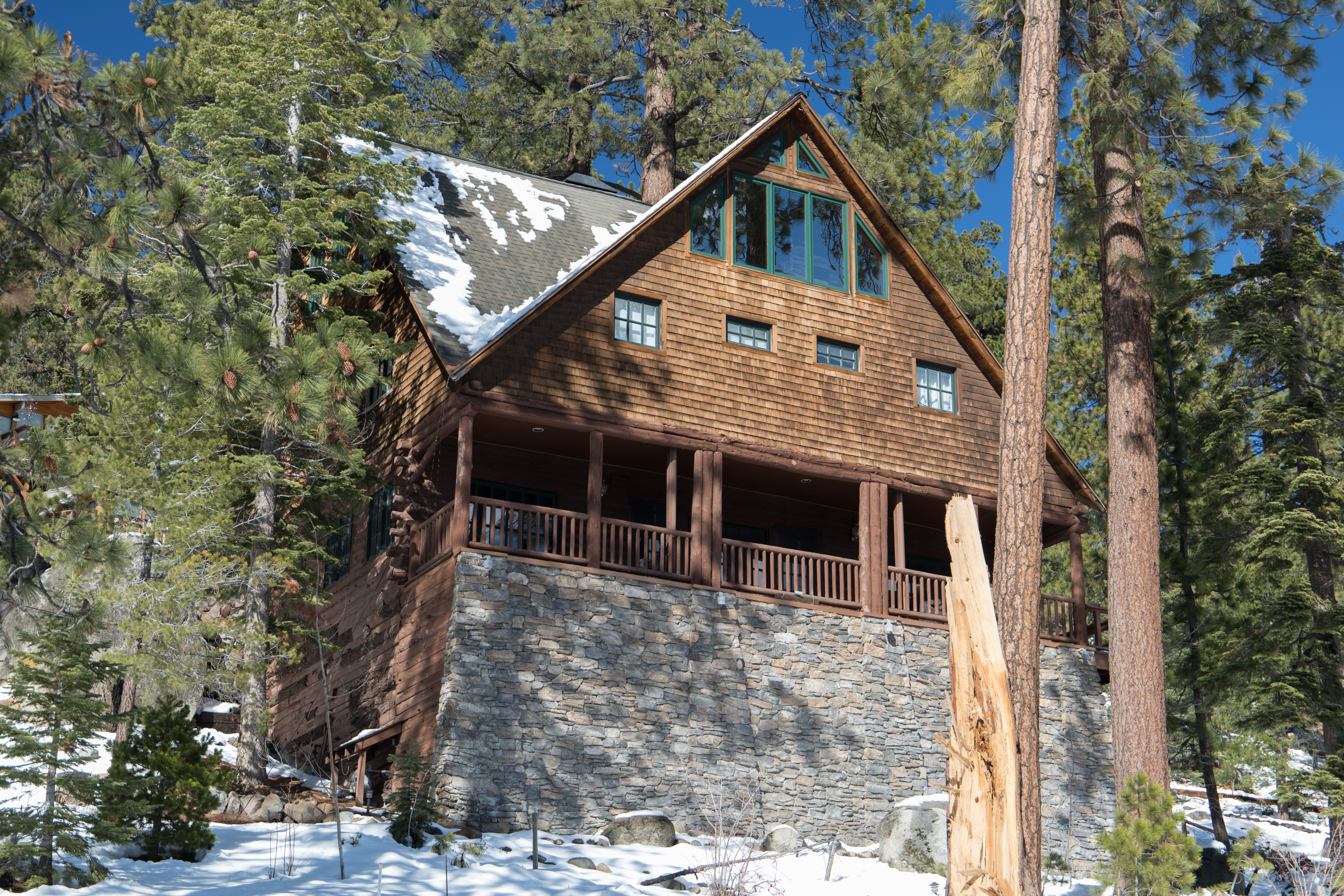

- Location within Nevada Location within the United States
- Location: 344 Wassou, Crystal Bay, Nevada
- Coordinates: 39°14′11″N 120°0′4″W
- Area: 0.3 acres (0.12 ha)
- Built: 1931
- Architectural style: rustic
- NRHP reference No.: 00000341
- Added to NRHP: April 6, 2000

The Withers Log House, at 344 Wassou in Crystal Bay, Nevada, is a historic house that was built in 1931. It was listed on the National Register of Historic Places in 2000.

It was deemed significant as a good example of "a modest, but well-designed and beautifully detailed log vacation home" which was one of the first homes built in the Crystal Bay Corporation's subdivision in the north shore area of Lake Tahoe.
