= Walter Cliff Ranch District =

Historic district in Nevada, United States

- U.S. National Register of Historic Places
- U.S. Historic district
- Location within Nevada Location within the United States
- Location: 7635 Old U.S. Route 395 (7635 Old HW 395), Washoe Valley, Nevada
- Coordinates: 39°13′29″N 119°48′42″W
- Area: 26.2 acres (10.6 ha)
- Built: 1873
- Architectural style: Bungalow/craftsman, Gothic, Vernacular Victorian
- NRHP reference No.: 85002428
- Added to NRHP: September 16, 1985

The Walter Cliff Ranch District, at 7635 Old HW 395 in Washoe Valley, Nevada is a historic site that was listed as a historic district on the National Register of Historic Places in 1985. It has significance dating from c.1870, when the house was built. The listing included two contributing buildings: the house and a root cellar/residence building.

It was deemed significant as the only surviving agricultural complex in Washoe Valley that had supplied foodstuffs (fruit, vegetables, dairy products, and hay) to the Comstock Mining District. As of 1985, only eight of many 19th-century ranches had any surviving remnants from that era. The listed district is 26.2 acres (10.6 ha) in size; the historic parcel was 130 acres (53 ha), purchased by Walter and Elizabeth Cliff in 1874.

Four additional structures on the property, including a garage and two sheds, dating from the early 20th century, are deemed non-contributing but are compatible with the historic usage and feel of the property.
