= Luella Garvey House =

Historic house in Nevada, United States

- U.S. National Register of Historic Places
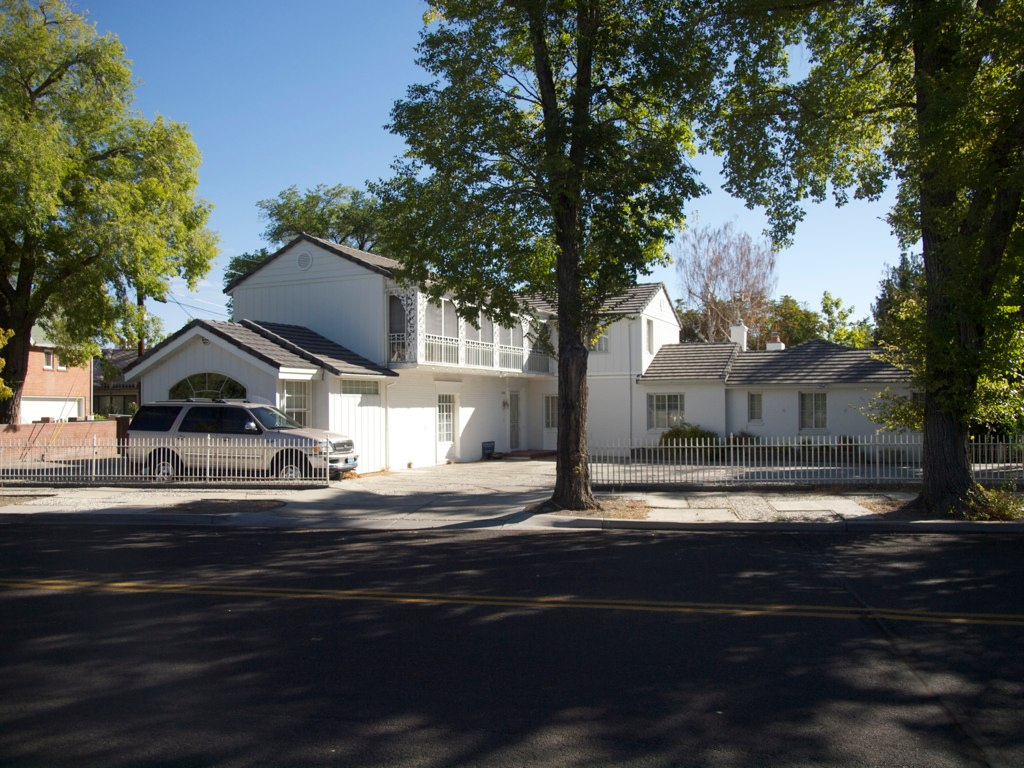

- Location within Nevada Location within the United States
- Location: 589-599 California Ave., Reno, Nevada
- Coordinates: 39°31′14″N 119°49′8″W
- Area: 0.4 acres (0.16 ha)
- Built: 1934
- Built by: Jameson, C.D.
- Architect: Williams, Paul Revere
- Architectural style: Colonial Revival
- NRHP reference No.: 03001510
- Added to NRHP: January 28, 2004

The Luella Garvey House, at 589–599 California Ave. in Reno, Nevada, United States.

== History ==
The house was designed by architect Paul Revere Williams (1894–1980), in the Colonial Revival style with French Regency architectural elements. Construction was completed in 1934.

The house was listed on the National Register of Historic Places in 2004. It was deemed notable as "the earliest Reno commission of the noted African-American architect Paul Revere Williams", who designed more than 15 works in Nevada.

== See also ==
- National Register of Historic Places listings in Washoe County, Nevada
