= Benson Dillon Billinghurst House =

Historic house in Nevada, United States

- U.S. National Register of Historic Places
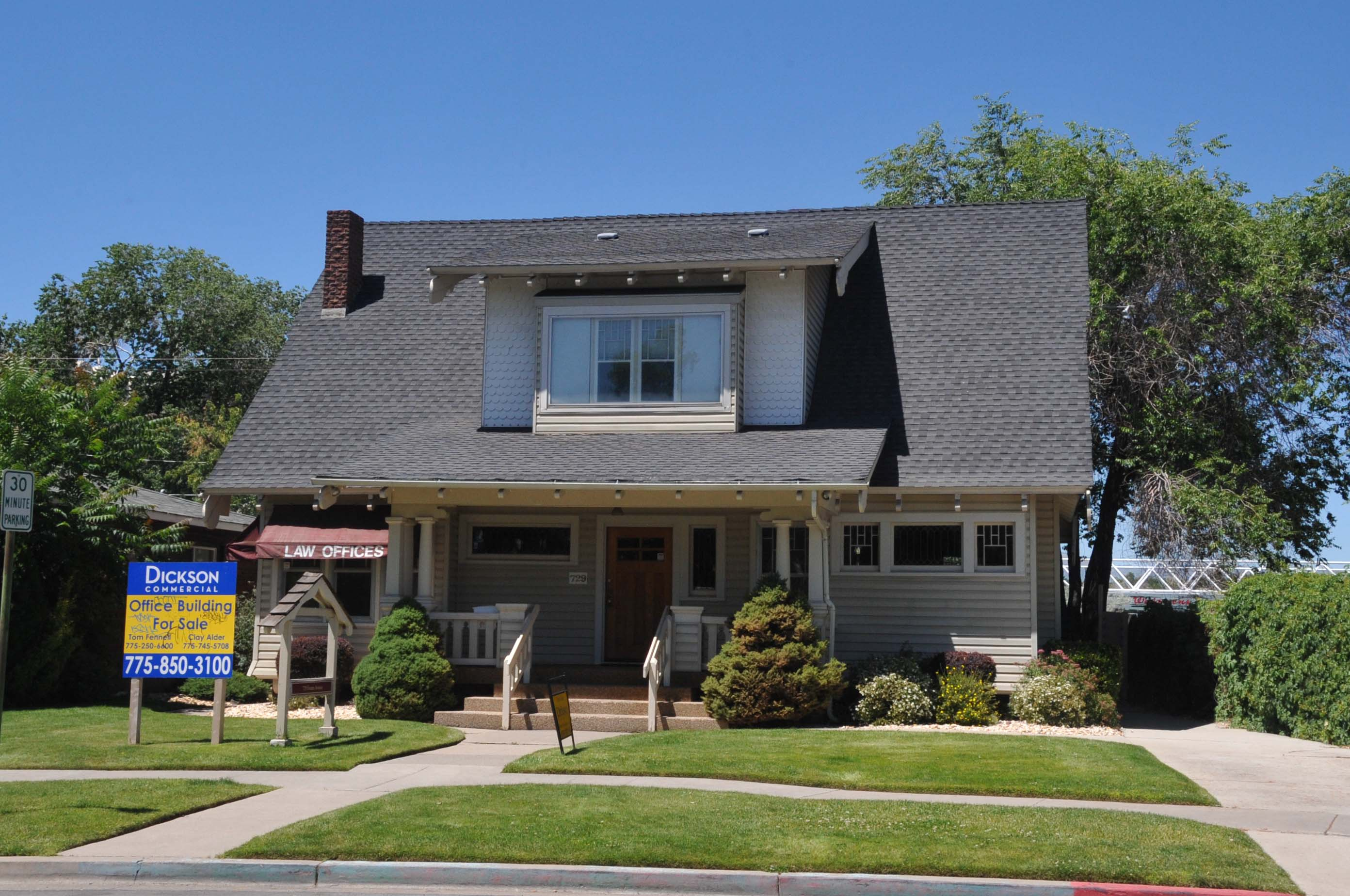

- Location within Nevada Location within the United States
- Location: 729 Evans Ave., Reno, Nevada
- Coordinates: 39°31′51″N 119°48′49″W
- Area: 0.1 acres (0.040 ha)
- Built: 1910
- Architectural style: Bungalow/craftsman
- NRHP reference No.: 74001151
- Added to NRHP: November 8, 1974

The Benson Dillon Billinghurst House, at 729 Evans Ave. in Reno, Nevada, was built in 1910. It was a home of educator Benson Dillon Billinghurst, who was superintendent of schools of Washoe County during a long period, from 1908 until his death in 1935. He led innovations such as the introduction of junior high schools. That Nevada's schools were rated second in quality, nationwide, by a 1933 U.S. Department of Education study, was regarded as testament to Billinghurst's leadership statewide. It was listed on the National Register of Historic Places in 1974.

The house is a two-story bungalow-style house, with an interior having varnished, stained pine finishes. The house is significant for its association with educator Billinghurst.
