= Rainier Brewing Company Bottling Plant =

- U.S. National Register of Historic Places
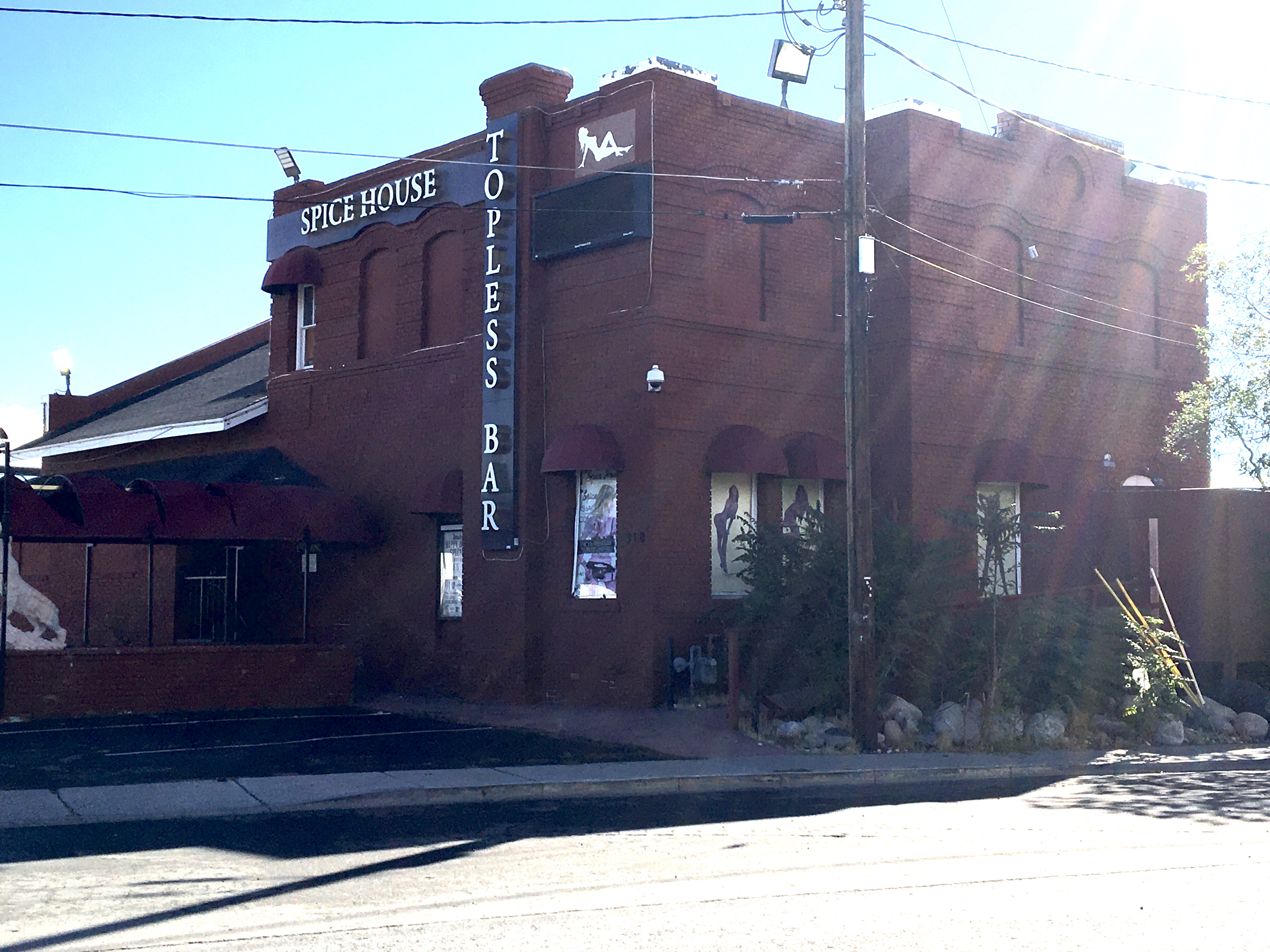

- Location within Nevada Location within the United States
- Location: 310 Spokane St., Reno, Nevada
- Coordinates: 39°31′54″N 119°48′01″W
- Area: 0.5 acres (0.20 ha)
- Built: 1905
- NRHP reference No.: 80002470
- Added to NRHP: March 26, 1980

The Rainier Brewing Company Bottling Plant, at 310 Spokane St. in Reno, Nevada, was built in 1905. It was also known as Ice House Antiques and required $30,000 to build.

== History ==
In 1914 with the start of Prohibition in Washington State, the brewing moved to San Francisco. Beer did continue to be bottled at the plant until 1919, when the 18th amendment and the Volstead Act forced them to stop. Rainier Brewing Company had to diversify and in 1919, Nevada Supply Company started to sell non-alcoholic beverages from the location. They housed other businesses including the Nevada National Ice and Cold Storage Company, National Coal Co., National Ice Co., National Oil and Burner Co. and the Ice House Antiques.

It was listed on the National Register of Historic Places in 1980.

It was deemed important as a vestige of the once-significant brewing industry in Reno.

Today, the building houses the Spice House Adult Caberet.
