= Nystrom Guest House =

Historic house in Nevada, United States

- U.S. National Register of Historic Places
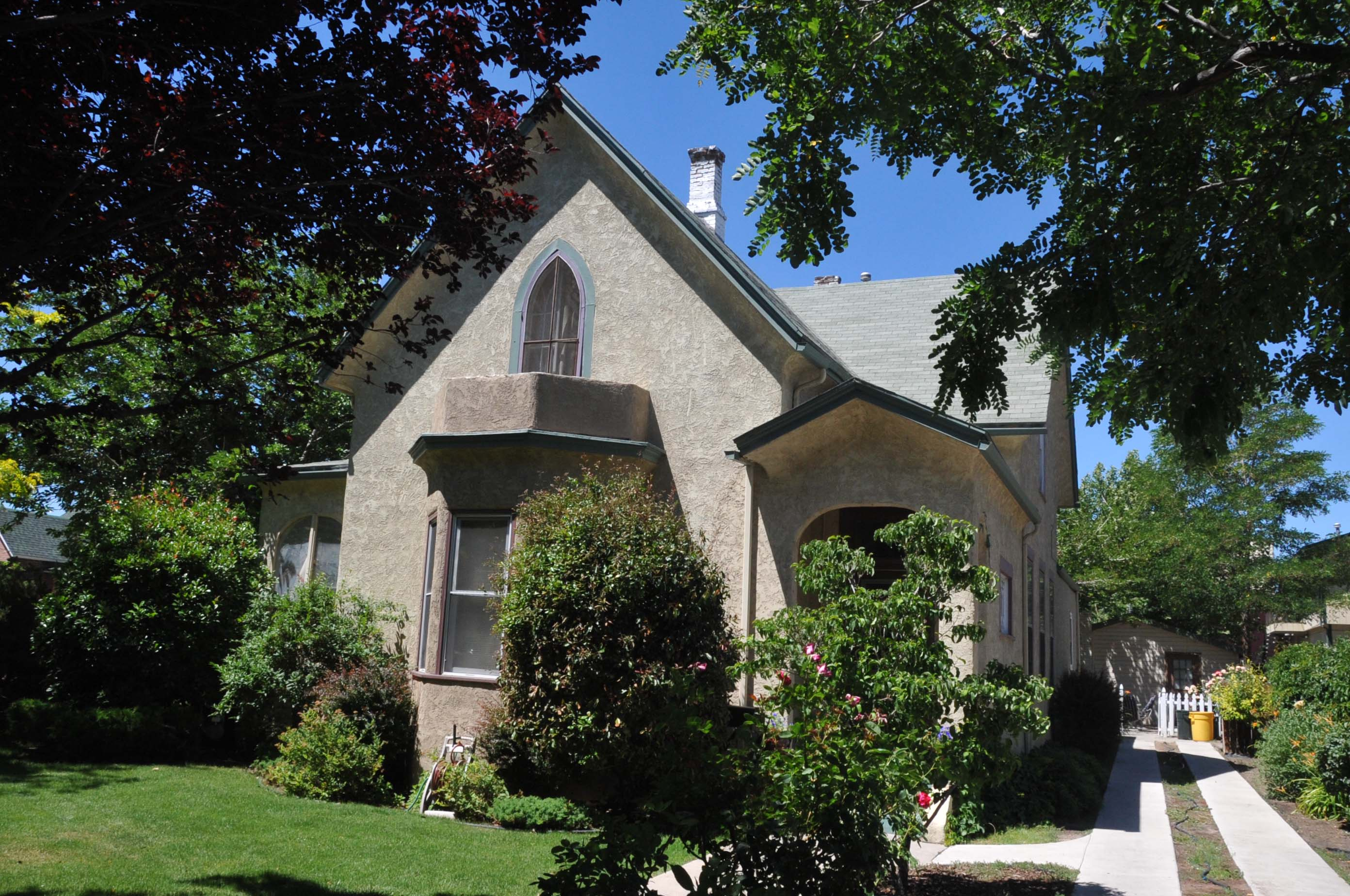

- Location within Nevada Location within the United States
- Location: 333 Ralston St., Reno, Nevada
- Coordinates: 39°31′41″N 119°49′11″W
- Area: 0.3 acres (0.12 ha)
- Built: 1875
- Architectural style: Gothic
- NRHP reference No.: 00000339
- Added to NRHP: April 6, 2000

The Nystrom Guest House, at 333 Ralston St. in Reno, Nevada, was built in 1875 as a "grand home" for Washoe County Clerk John Shoemaker. It includes Gothic Revival architecture. Also known as the Shoemaker Home, it was listed on the National Register of Historic Places in 2000.

The house was reoriented 90 degrees—moved—to allow a subdivision of its original parcel c.1900. The Nystrom family purchased the house in 1944.
