= Tyson House (Reno, Nevada) =

Historic house in Nevada, United States

- U.S. National Register of Historic Places
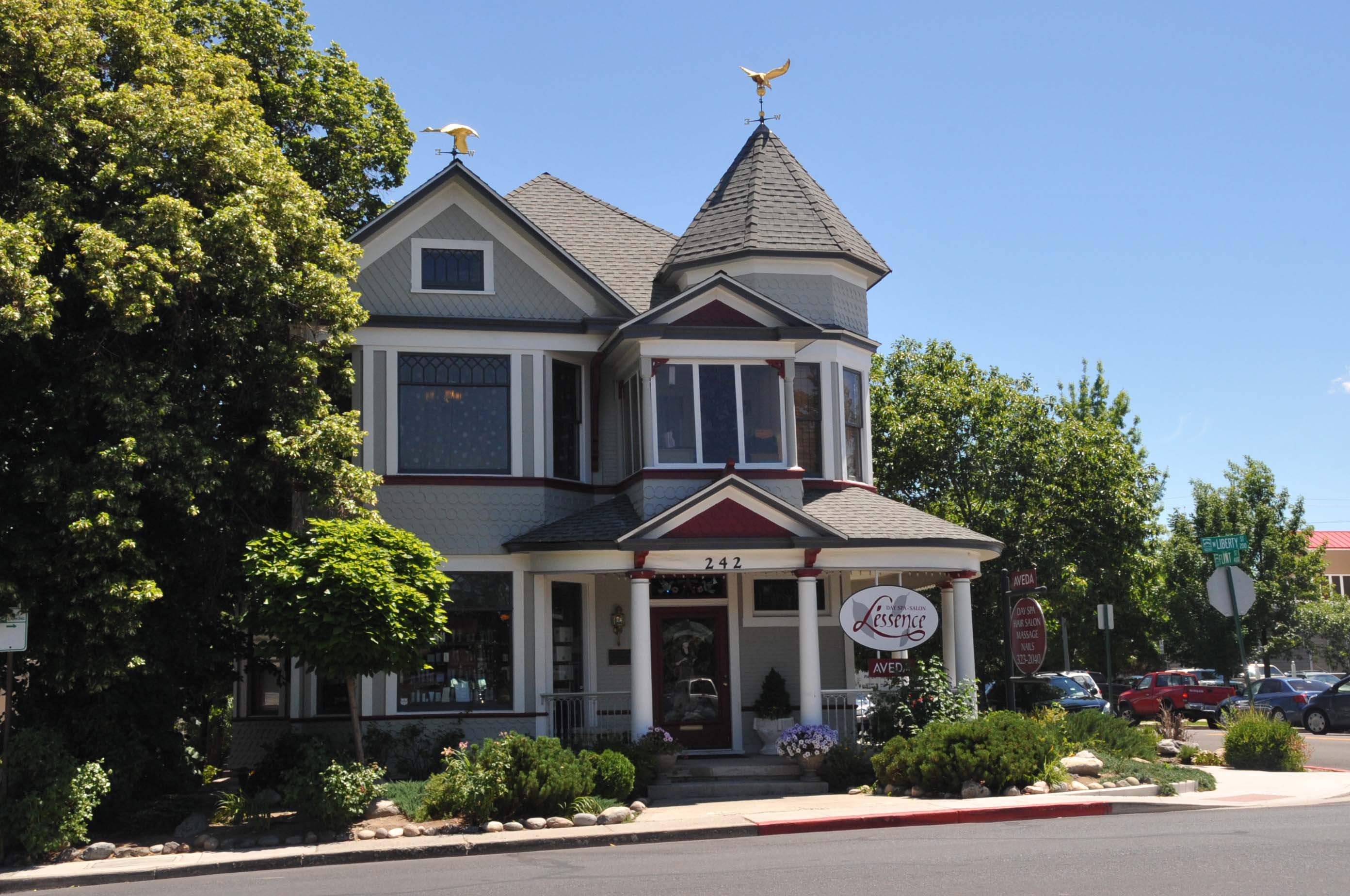

- Location within Nevada Location within the United States
- Location: 242 W. Liberty St., Reno, Nevada
- Coordinates: 39°31′15″N 119°48′53″W 39°31'15"
- Area: 0.1 acres (0.040 ha)
- Built: 1904
- Architectural style: Colonial Revival, Queen Anne
- NRHP reference No.: 83001123
- Added to NRHP: February 24, 1983

The Tyson House, at 242 W. Liberty St. in Reno, Nevada, is a historic house that was built during 1904–1906 and that was once owned by the family of Nevada senator Francis Newlands. It includes Colonial Revival elements but is primarily of Queen Anne architectural style.

The structure is primarily significant for its architecture; the building "is an imposing and interesting vernacular example of its style in Reno, and one of the increasingly rarer representatives of this era in the City's past." It has been modified only slightly, and "gains prominence through its corner siting." It was listed on the National Register of Historic Places in 1983; the listing included two contributing buildings.
