= Peavine Ranch =

- U.S. National Register of Historic Places
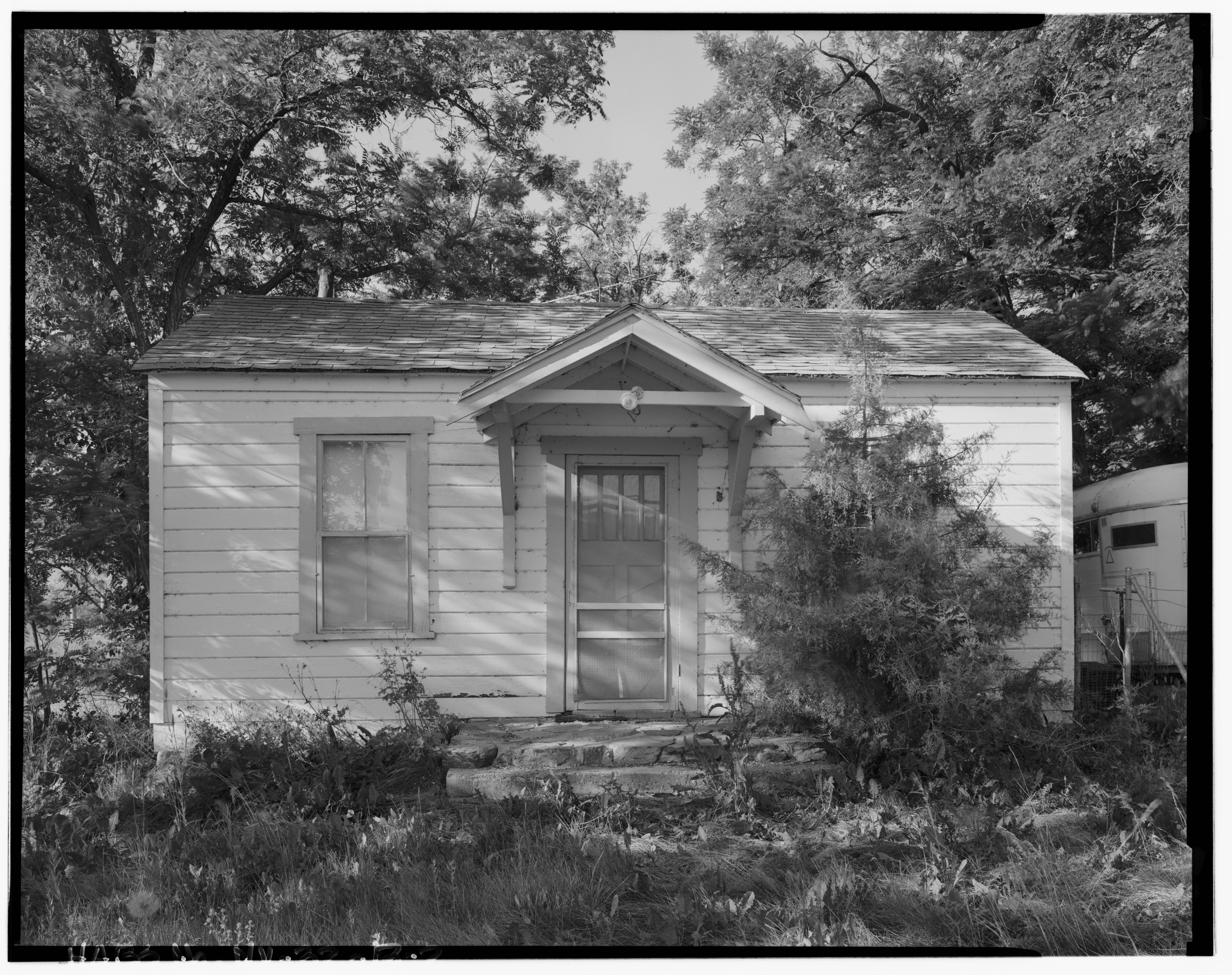

- Location within Nevada Location within the United States
- Location: 11220 N. Virginia St., Reno, Nevada
- Coordinates: 39°37′46″N 119°55′13″W
- Area: 5.2 acres (2.1 ha)
- Built: 1862
- Architectural style: Bungalow/craftsman
- NRHP reference No.: 00000337
- Added to NRHP: April 6, 2000

The Peavine Ranch, at 11220 N. Virginia St. in Reno, Nevada, is a historic 5.2-acre (2.1 ha) property with significance dating to 1862. It was listed on the National Register of Historic Places in 2000; the listing included five contributing buildings. It was once a stagecoach stop, but became a ghost town after a fire in 1900.
