= Frey Ranch =

- U.S. National Register of Historic Places
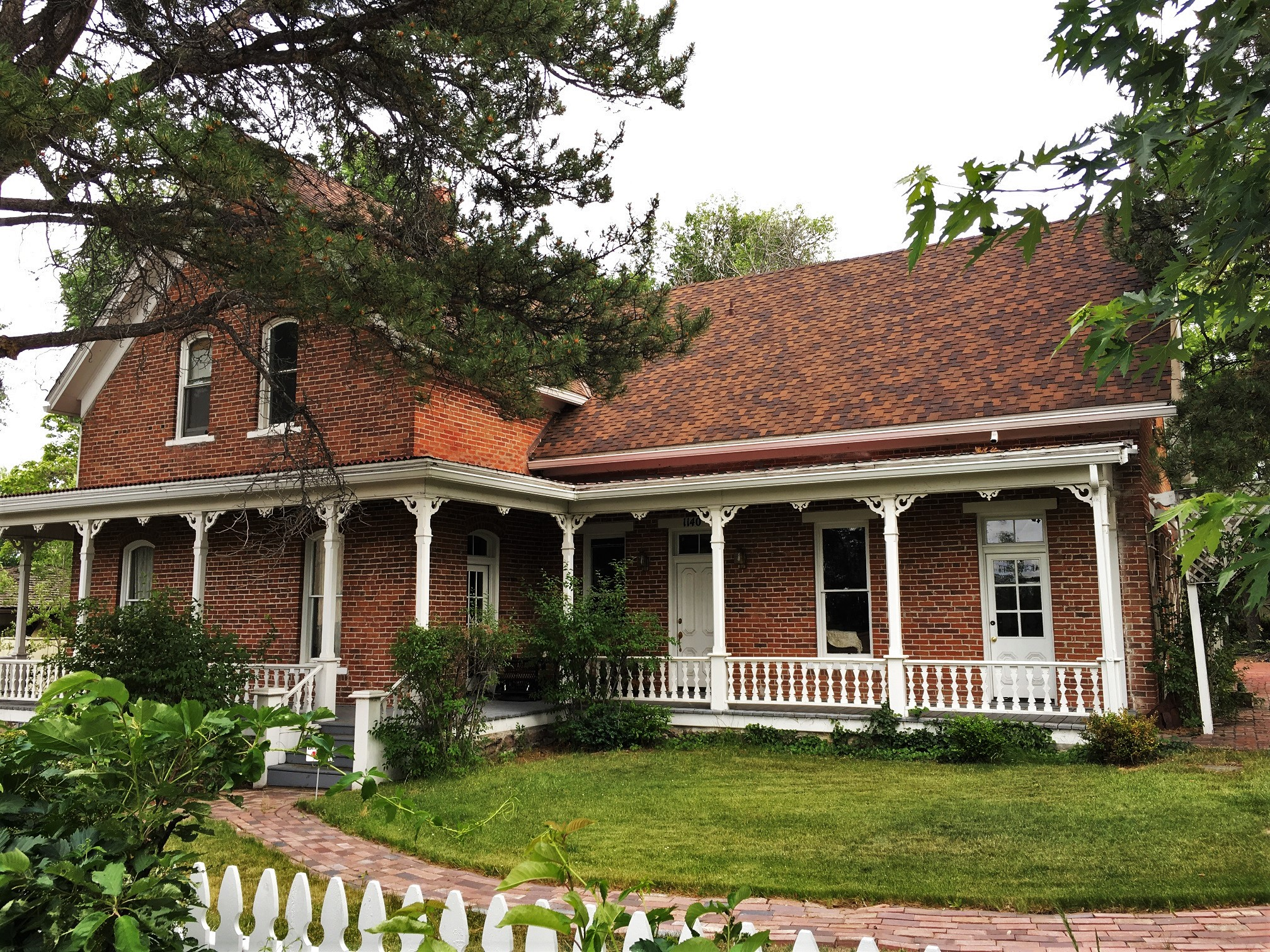

- Location within Nevada Location within the United States
- Location: 1140 W. Peckham Ln., Reno, Nevada
- Coordinates: 39°29′14″N 119°48′27″W
- Area: 1 acre (0.40 ha)
- Built: 1870
- Architectural style: Late Victorian
- NRHP reference No.: 99000267
- Added to NRHP: March 5, 1999

The Frey Ranch, at 1140 W. Peckham Ln. near Reno, Nevada, dates from 1870, when a 240 acres (97 ha) ranch was founded. A 1 acre (0.40 ha) site of its main house, including Late Victorian architecture, survives. It was listed on the National Register of Historic Places in 1999; the listing included three contributing buildings.

The three historic buildings are the main ranchhouse (begun c.1870-1875), a cookhouse/bunkhouse, and a creamery/meathouse. The property was deemed significant "for its association with the development of agriculture and irrigation in the Truckee Meadows during the nineteenth and twentieth centuries, and for its role in Reno's famous divorce trade during the 1920s and 1930s." It also is important for having served the Comstock Lode area with agricultural products.

In 1999 the site was located in an unincorporated area of Washoe County near Reno.
