= Galena Creek Schoolhouse =

Historic building in Nevada, United States

- U.S. National Register of Historic Places
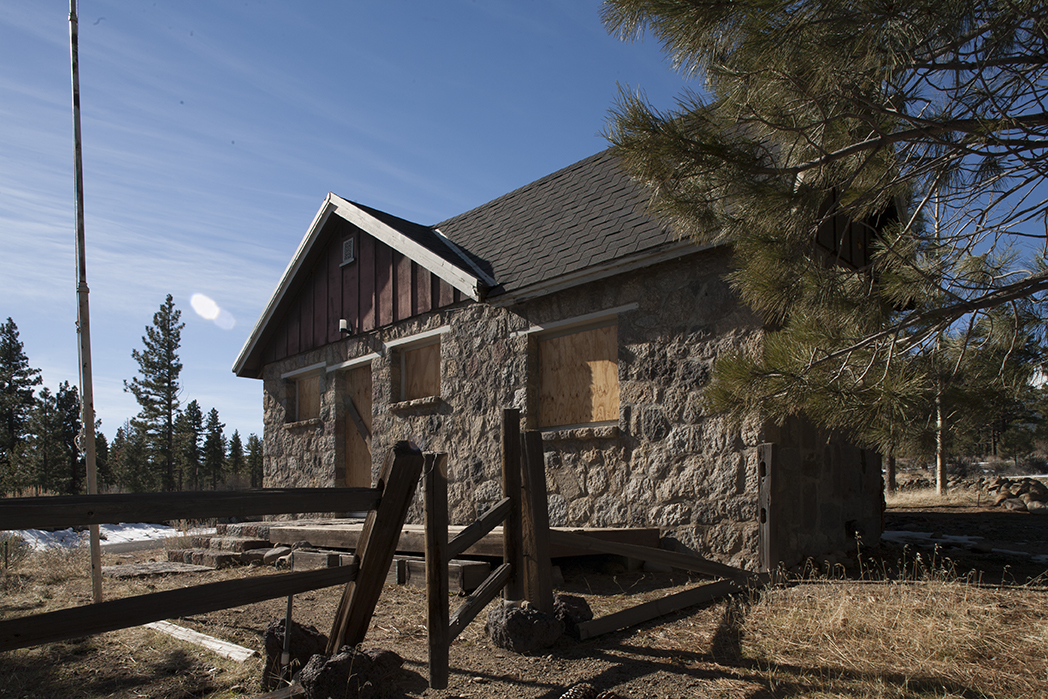

- Location within Nevada Location within the United States
- Location: 16000 Callahan Rd., Reno, Nevada
- Coordinates: 39°21′39″N 119°49′6″W
- Area: 1.03 acres (0.42 ha)
- MPS: School Buildings in Nevada MPS
- NRHP reference No.: 11000255
- Added to NRHP: May 4, 2011

The Galena Creek Schoolhouse in Washoe County, Nevada, in Reno, is a historic schoolhouse that was listed on the National Register of Historic Places in 2011.

It is located just south of Galena Creek near Callahan Park.

Nevada's most famous poet of the 1960s and 1970s, Joanne de Longchamps lived in the schoolhouse in 1975 and wrote a book of poetry named "The Schoolhouse Poems". In 1974 Joanne wrote “Three years ago Galen and I acquired (at an auction from the School District ) an acre of land at timberline. It lies under the dominion of Mount Rose and Galena Creek. In one corner of this acre is the schoolhouse – a one room building of hand-cut local stone. To my knowledge, this is the third schoolhouse to stand on or near this site. The first was built when the town of Galena thrived in the 1860s, a timbering town (no longer in existence) that supplied the mines of Virginia City."
