= Miller–Rowe–Holgate House =

Historic house in Nevada, United States

- U.S. National Register of Historic Places
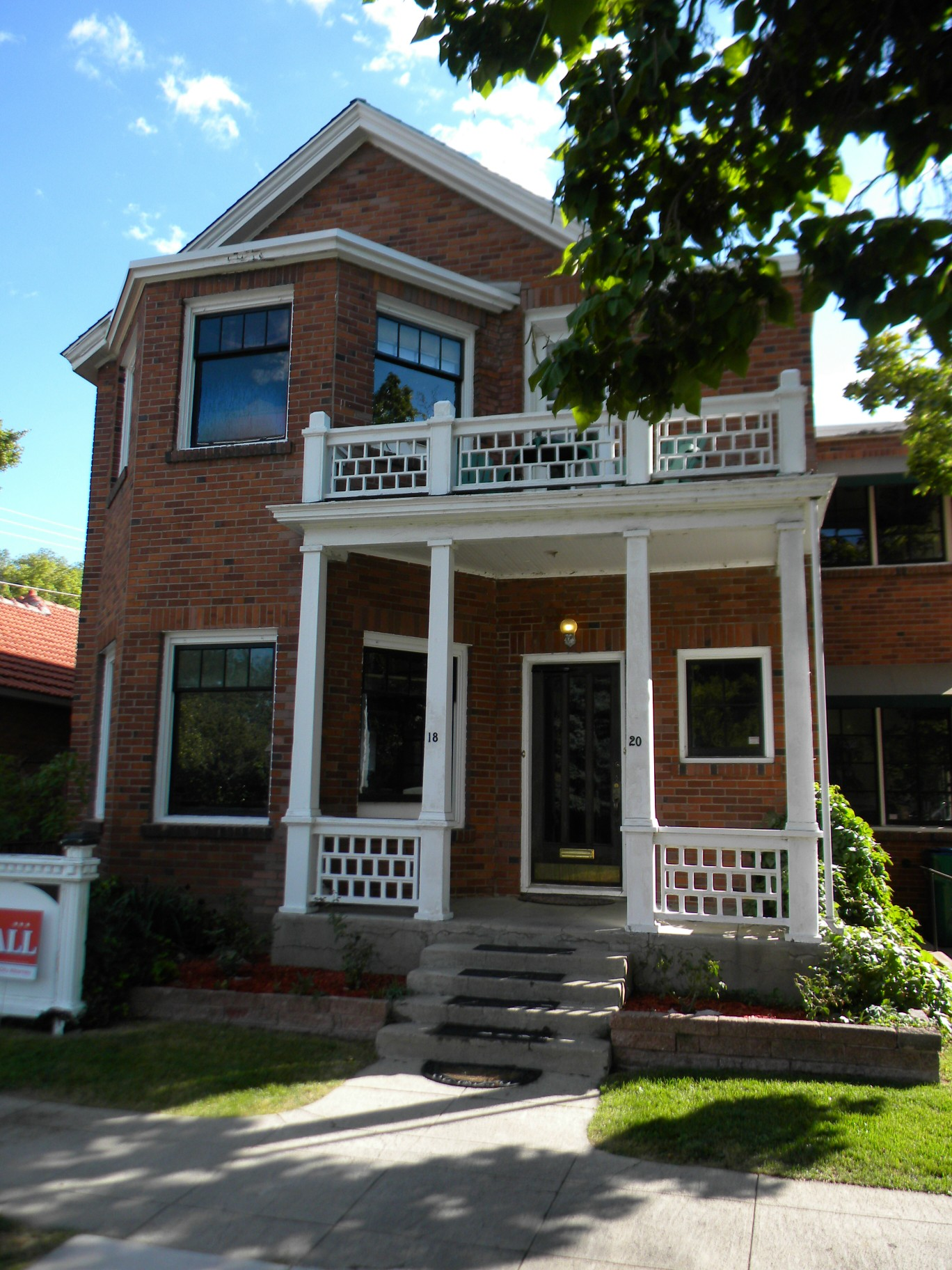

- Location within Nevada Location within the United States
- Location: 18 Winter St., Reno, Nevada
- Coordinates: 39°31′20″N 119°49′16″W
- Area: 0.1 acres (0.040 ha)
- Built: 1902-03
- Architectural style: Colonial Revival
- NRHP reference No.: 05000470
- Added to NRHP: May 26, 2005

The Miller–Rowe–Holgate House at 18 Winter St. in Reno, Nevada is a historic house that was built in 1902–03. It was listed on the National Register of Historic Places in 2005; the listing included two contributing buildings.

It was deemed significant "for its association with the community planning and development area of significance, and the evolution of building use in Powning's Addition" development of Reno. After remodeling, the structure provided three apartments (flats) as housing to serve Reno's profitable divorce trade.
