= Newlands Historic District =

Historic district in Nevada, United States

- U.S. National Register of Historic Places
- U.S. Historic district
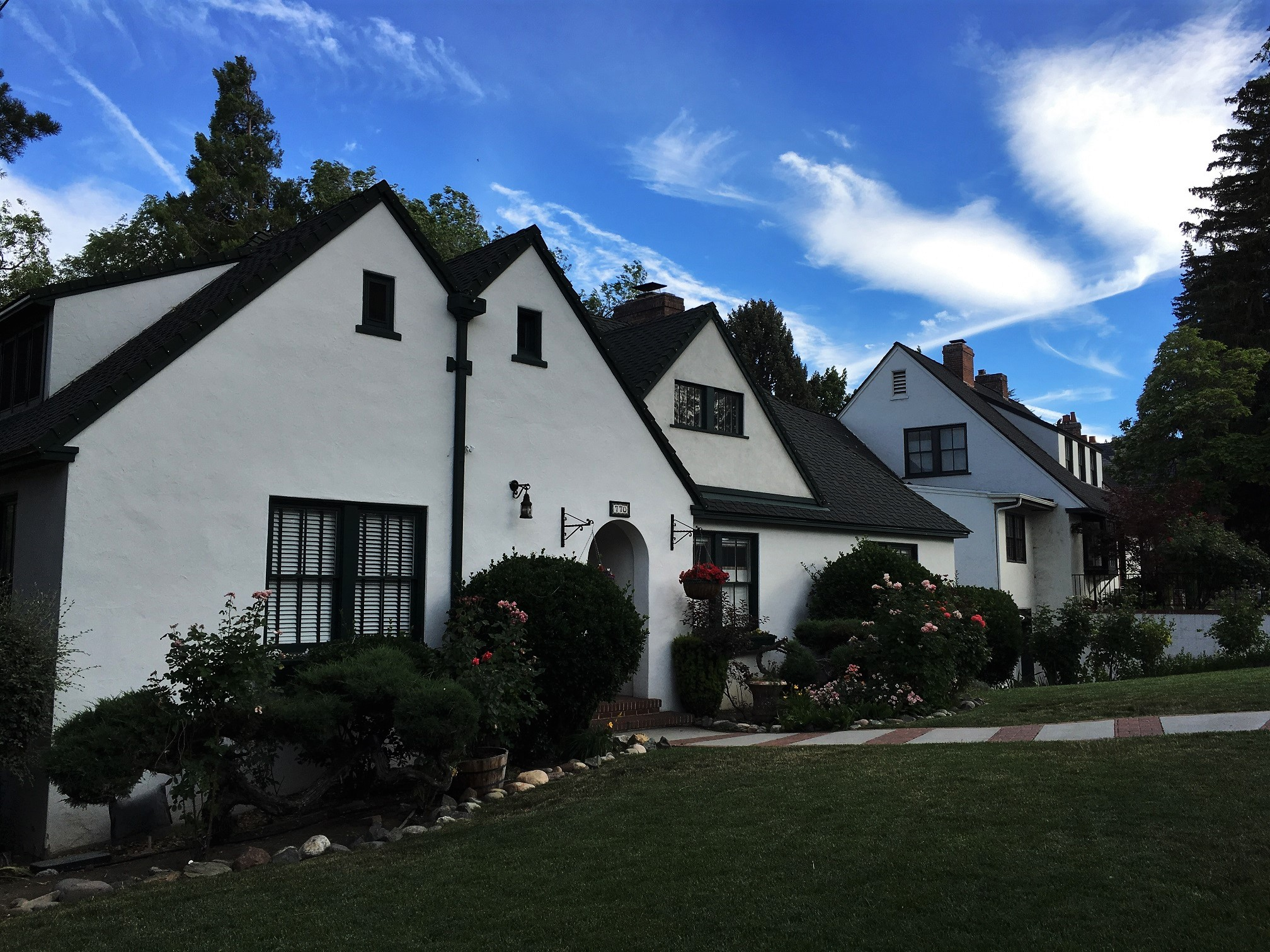
- 700 block of California Ave.

- Location within Nevada Location within the United States
- Location: Reno, Nevada
- Coordinates: 39°30′57″N 119°49′16″W
- NRHP reference No.: 16000912
- Added to NRHP: December 27, 2016

The Newlands Historic District in Reno, Nevada is a historic district on the bluffs south of the Truckee River which was listed on the National Register of Historic Places in 2016.

It is a residential district bounded by the Truckee River on the north, Arlington Avenue on the east, Monroe Street on the south and Keystone Avenue, California Avenue and Sharon Way on the west.

According to the Nevada State Historic Preservation Office:

The Newlands Historic District was also recognized for its importance to Reno’s historic architecture, possessing a stylistic diversity and level of design quality rare in northwest Nevada. Many of the region’s best known architects of the early twentieth century completed some of their most significant residential commissions in Nevada in the Newlands neighborhood, creating several of Reno’s most outstanding examples of Period Revival and Craftsman homes. The Newlands neighborhood includes a broad but carefully selected mix of residential architecture planned by the community’s developers under the umbrella of the Newlands Company, who intended the buildings to blend with the neighborhood’s broader City Beautiful aesthetic. The landscape and architecture of the Newlands neighborhood defined the architectural and landscape development of future neighborhoods in the city and remains among the best preserved early-twentieth century residential areas in Reno.
