= Bank of Sparks =

- U.S. National Register of Historic Places
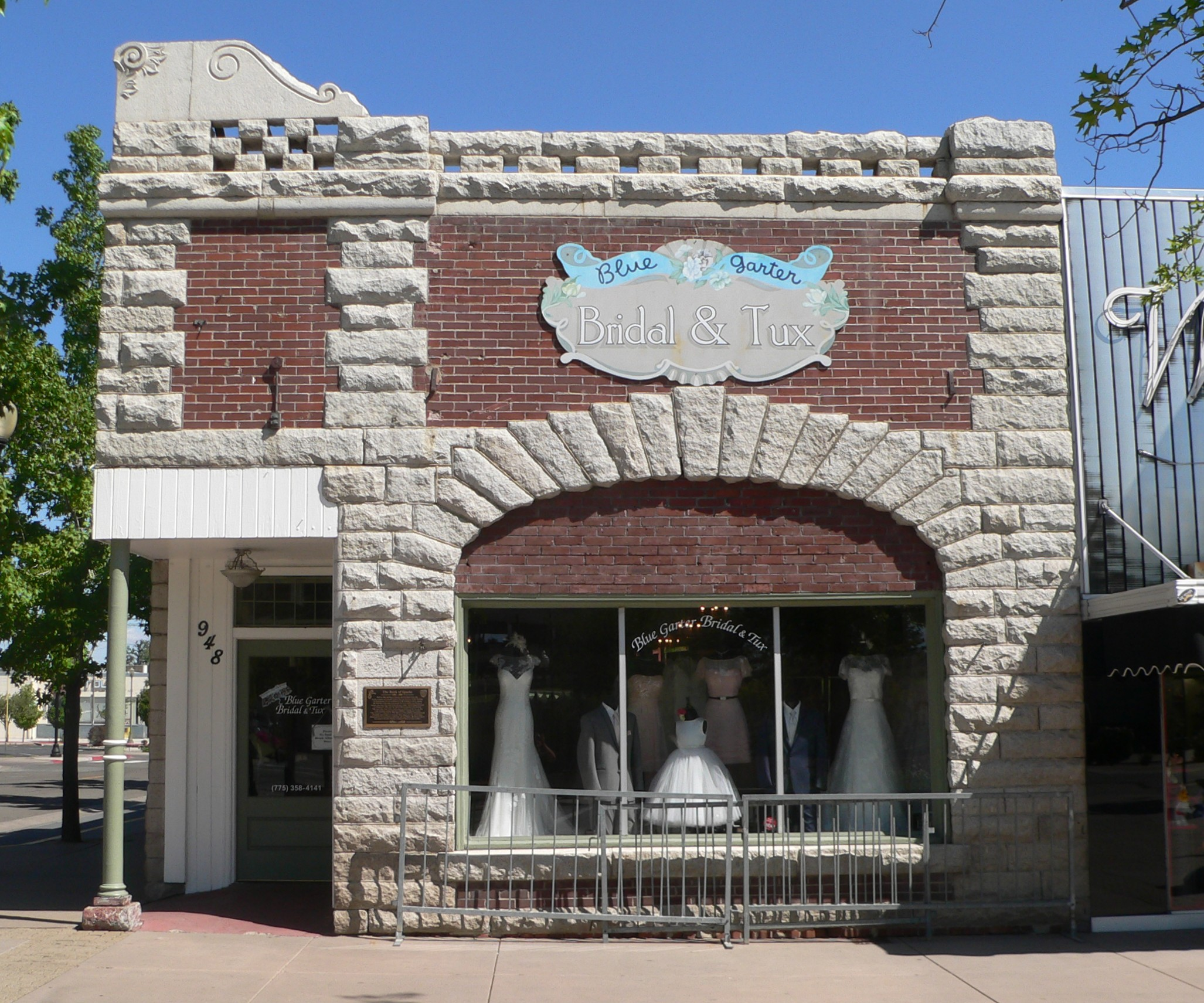
- Bank of Sparks, now Blue Garter Bridal & Tux

- Location within Nevada Location within the United States
- Location: 948 Victorian Ave., Sparks, Nevada
- Coordinates: 39°32′6″N 119°45′19.5″W
- Area: less than one acre
- Built: 1905
- Architectural style: Romanesque
- NRHP reference No.: 07001013
- Added to NRHP: September 28, 2007

The Bank of Sparks is a bank in Sparks, Nevada. It was built in 1905 in the Romanesque Revival style. It was listed in the National Register of Historic Places in 2007.
