= Washoe Valley (Nevada) =

Valley in Nevada, USA

Geography
- Country: United States
- State: Nevada
- Coordinates: 39.2697°N 119.805°W
- Interactive map of Washoe Valley

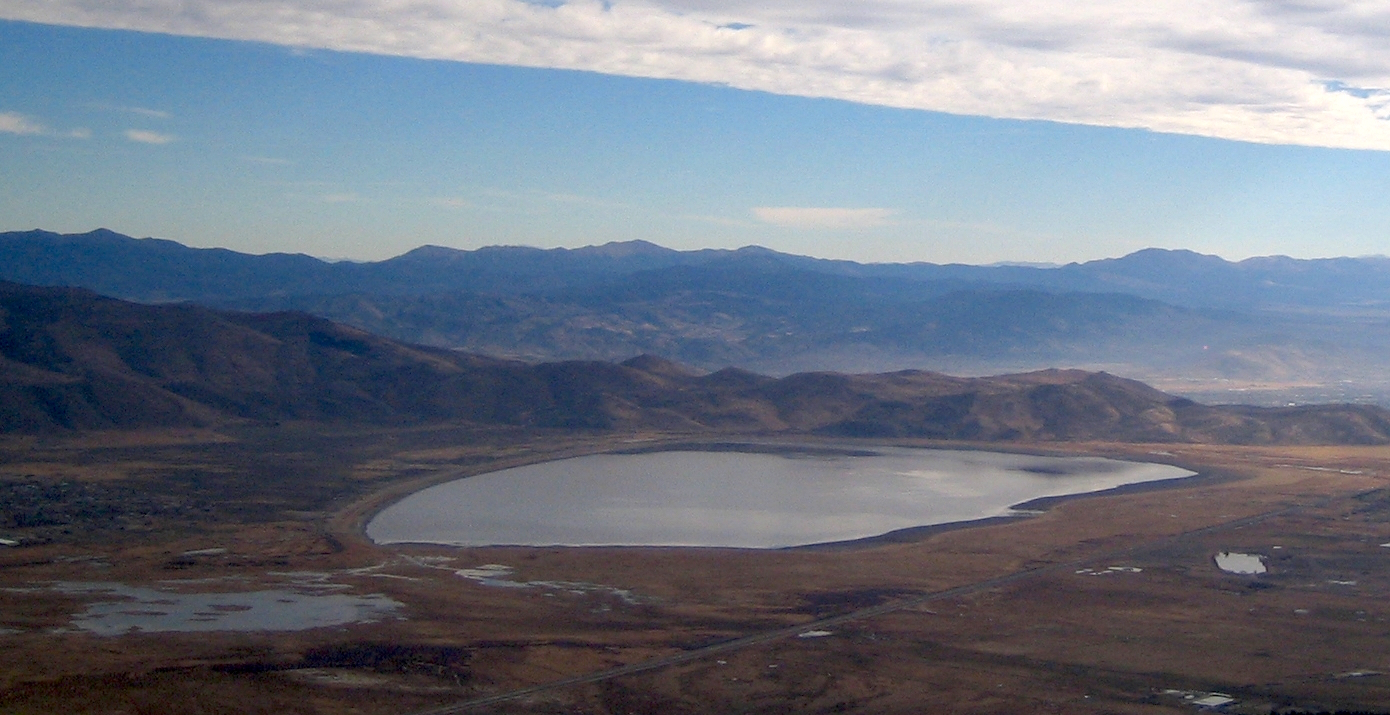
Washoe Lake in Washoe Valley

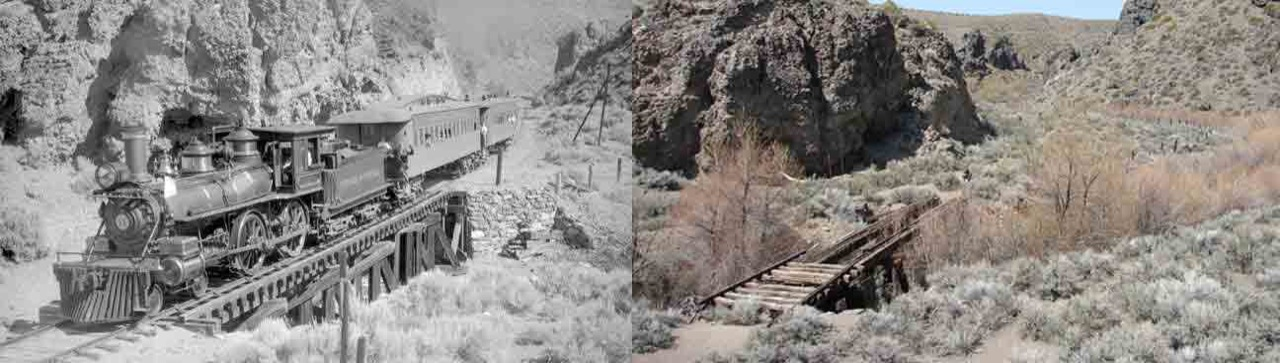
Virginia and Truckee Railroad in Washoe Canyon, then and now

The Washoe Valley is a geographical region in the United States covering 66 square miles (170 km^{2}) in southern Washoe County in the state of Nevada. Located between Reno and Carson City, it is named for the Washoe people, Native Americans who lived there before the arrival of Europeans. Slide Mountain and Mount Rose overlook the valley from the west.

New Washoe City and Washoe Lake are located in the valley. The census-designated place of Washoe Valley, Nevada, corresponds closely to the area covered by New Washoe City and as of the 2010 Census had a population of 3,019. The valley's ZIP codes are 89701 and 89704, which are often associated with Carson City and other areas nearby.

== History ==
From 1857 to 1957, Theodore Winters (1823–1906) and his daughter, Neva Winters Sauer, owned and operated a 4,000-acre (1,600 ha) cattle farm and Thoroughbred stud with a quarter-mile training track. Among the ranch's famous horses was El Rio Rey, the American Champion Two-Year-Old Colt of 1889. The Winters Ranch and Bowers Mansion in the valley are today listed on the National Register of Historic Places. Winters, California, is named in honor of Theodore Winters.

=== Washoe Zephyr ===
The Washoe Valley, along with much of the region in the lee of the Sierra Nevada mountains, is known for its occasionally strong winds. These sometimes require the closing of U.S. 395, the principal north-south highway, to high profile vehicles. One of these, known as the Washoe Zephyr, occurs during the summer, sometimes daily.

Describing the Washoe Zephyr as it occurred while he was in Carson City, Mark Twain wrote:

"A Washoe wind is by no means a trifling matter. It blows flimsy houses down, lifts shingle roofs occasionally, rolls up tin ones like sheet music, now and then blows a stage-coach over and spills the passengers; and tradition says the reason there are so many bald people there is, that the wind blows the hair off their heads while they are looking skyward after their hats."

== Transportation ==
The valley is a main thoroughfare in northern Nevada, with Interstate 580/US 395 and US 395 Alt passing along the base of the Sierra Nevada at the western edge of the valley, connecting Reno and Carson City. The Virginia & Truckee Railroad used to pass through this transportation corridor from 1872 to 1950, with the grade highly visible through the middle of the valley, and many bridges across the creeks near Pagni Canyon were still there (as pictured above) until the Washoe Drive Fire occurred and swept through the canyon. There are also small bridges whose framework is still there farther south along the route.
