= Odd Fellows Building (Reno, Nevada) =

- Formerly listed on the U.S. National Register of Historic Places
- Location: 133 N. Sierra St., Reno, Nevada
- Area: 1 acre (0.40 ha)
- Built: 1929
- NRHP reference No.: 78001730
- Removed from NRHP: October 13, 2000

The Odd Fellows Building at 133 N. Sierra St. in Reno, Nevada, United States was built in 1929. It served as a clubhouse. It was listed on the National Register of Historic Places. However, it was demolished in 1992.

It was delisted from the National Register in 2000.
