= W.E. Barnard House =

Historic house in Nevada, United States

- U.S. National Register of Historic Places
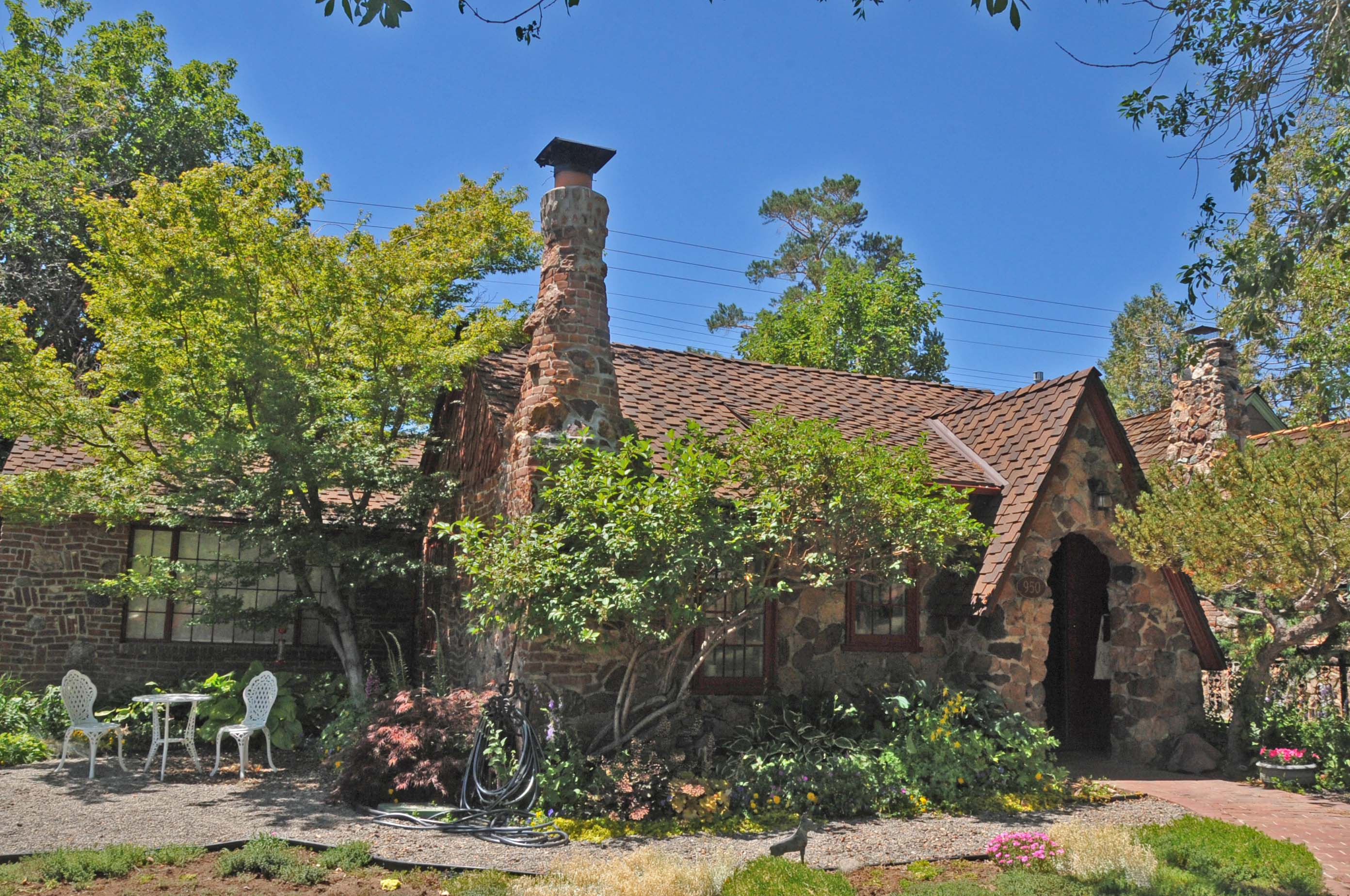

- Location within Nevada Location within the United States
- Location: 950 Joaquin Miller Dr., Reno, Nevada
- Coordinates: 39°30′47″N 119°49′9″W
- Area: less than one acre
- Built: 1930
- Built by: Barnard, W.E.
- Architectural style: Tudor Revival
- NRHP reference No.: 02000874
- Added to NRHP: August 22, 2002

The W.E. Barnard House, at 950 Joaquin Miller Dr. in Reno, Nevada, United States, was built in 1930. It includes Tudor Revival architecture, and, within that, is best described as a Cotswold Cottage style small house. Its two most dominant architectural features are a beehive chimney and a "high-pitched, gabled entry with a characteristic Tudor arch".

It was listed on the National Register of Historic Places in 2002; the listing included two contributing buildings. It was deemed significant "for its role in Reno's community planning and development history", having to do with its association with developer William Everett Barnard, and also "as an excellent local example of the Tudor/English Country Cottage style of architecture, within the broader category of Period Revival."
