= Veterans of Foreign Wars Building =

- U.S. National Register of Historic Places
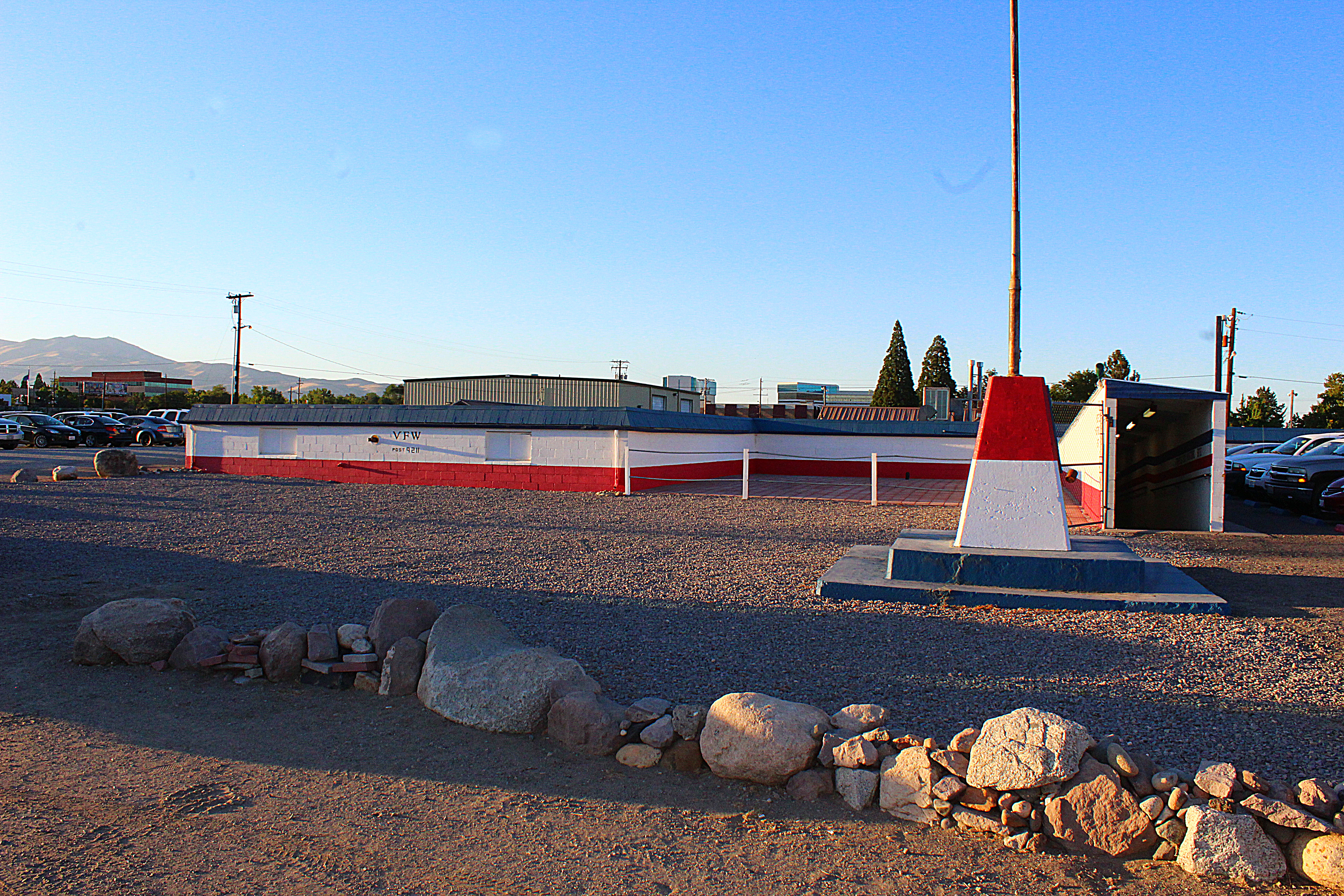

- Location within Nevada Location within the United States
- Location: 255 VFW Historic Ln, Reno, Nevada 89509
- Coordinates: 39°29′23″N 119°47′55″W
- Area: 0.3 acres (0.12 ha)
- NRHP reference No.: 08000511
- Added to NRHP: June 10, 2008

The Veterans of Foreign Wars Building in Reno, Nevada, located at 255 VFW Historic Ln, is a historic building that was listed on the U.S. National Register of Historic Places in 2008. The building was a combined work of VFW Post 207 (founded 1926) and VFW Post 9211 (founded 1944), and includes a "semi-subterranean hall" in Reno's Tighe Park. The 2012 national convention of the Veterans of Foreign Wars was held in Reno, and U.S. president Barack Obama gave a speech.
