= Francovich House =

Historic house in Nevada, United States

- U.S. National Register of Historic Places
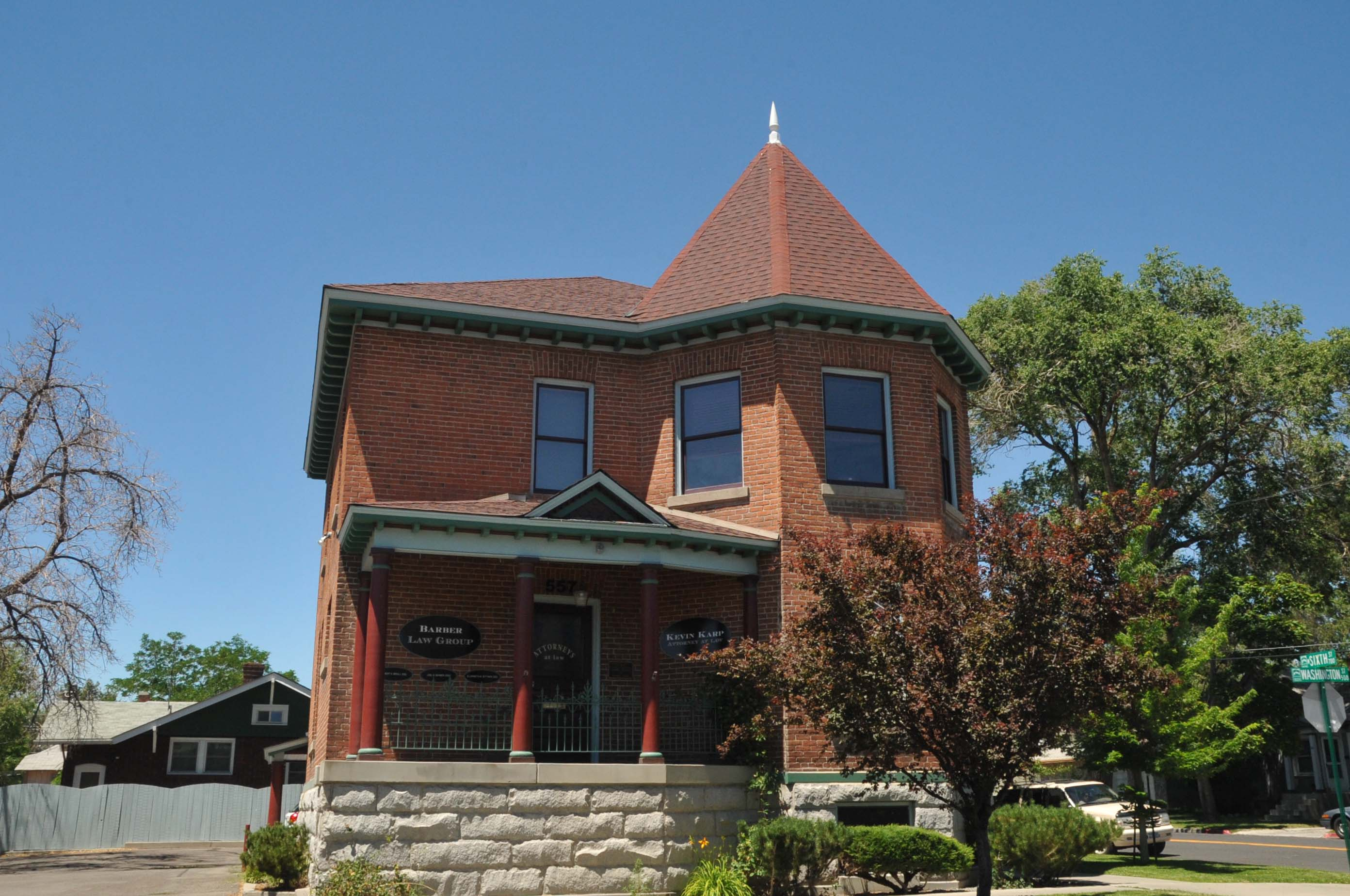

- Location within Nevada Location within the United States
- Location: 557 Washington St., Reno, Nevada
- Coordinates: 39°31′41″N 119°49′10″W
- Area: 0.3 acres (0.12 ha)
- Built: 1899-1900
- Built by: Francovich, Eli
- Architectural style: Colonial Revival, Queen Anne
- NRHP reference No.: 83001116
- Added to NRHP: April 25, 1983

The Francovich House, at 557 Washington St. in Reno, Nevada, USA, was built during 1899–1900. It was listed on the National Register of Historic Places in 1983 and was delisted later the same year, when it was moved to save it from demolition.
