= New Washoe City, Nevada =

Unincorporated community in Nevada, US

- Unincorporated community
- Location within the state of Nevada
- Coordinates: 39°18′5″N 119°46′18″W
- Country: United States
- State: Nevada
- County: Washoe
- Elevation: 5,098 ft (1,554 m)
- Time zone: UTC-8 (Pacific (PST))
  - Summer (DST): UTC-7 (PDT)
- ZIP code: 89704
- GNIS feature ID: 860731

New Washoe City is an unincorporated community located in Washoe County, Nevada, United States. It is located in the Washoe Valley in southern Washoe County between Reno and Carson City, on the east side of Washoe Lake. It is part of the Reno–Sparks Metropolitan Statistical Area. As of the 1990 census, New Washoe City had a population of 2,875. The area was not listed as a census-designated place (CDP) at the 2000 census but was listed as "Washoe Valley, Nevada", for statistical purposes in the 2010 census, at which time it had a population of 3,019.

New Washoe City was founded as a planned community in 1961. Lots were on sale for $1500 then, $35 down and $35 per month.

New Washoe City is named after the older, much smaller nearby locale of Washoe City, commonly referred to as Old Washoe City, which clusters around the northwest side of Little Washoe Lake. New Washoe City is probably best known for its nearby proximity to Washoe Lake, Little Washoe Lake and the adjacent Washoe Lake State Park. New Washoe City is connected to the Reno-Carson City corridor, US 395/I-580 and U.S. Route 395 Alternate by Eastlake Boulevard (former State Route 428). Washoe City, founded in August 1861, was the first county seat of Washoe County. The county seat moved to Reno in February 1871.

In September 2024, New Washoe City was heavily impacted by the Davis Fire. After the fire jumped Interstate 580 towards New Washoe City, fourteen structures (including eleven homes and a church) were lost in the area. The city was put under an evacuation order.

New Washoe City's ZIP code is 89704 and is associated with the Washoe Valley. The town is commonly also associated with Carson City, even though it is entirely within Washoe County borders.

== Geography ==
New Washoe City is associated with Carson City even though it is within Washoe County because the Carson City Post Office distributes mail to the New Washoe City zip code of 89704. A number of years ago Washoe Valley was not used as a postal designation and Washoe Valley residents used the Carson City designation, though in recent years the Postal Service has begun recognizing Washoe Valley as an acceptable address designation.
