= Pearl Upson House =

Historic house in Nevada, United States

- U.S. National Register of Historic Places
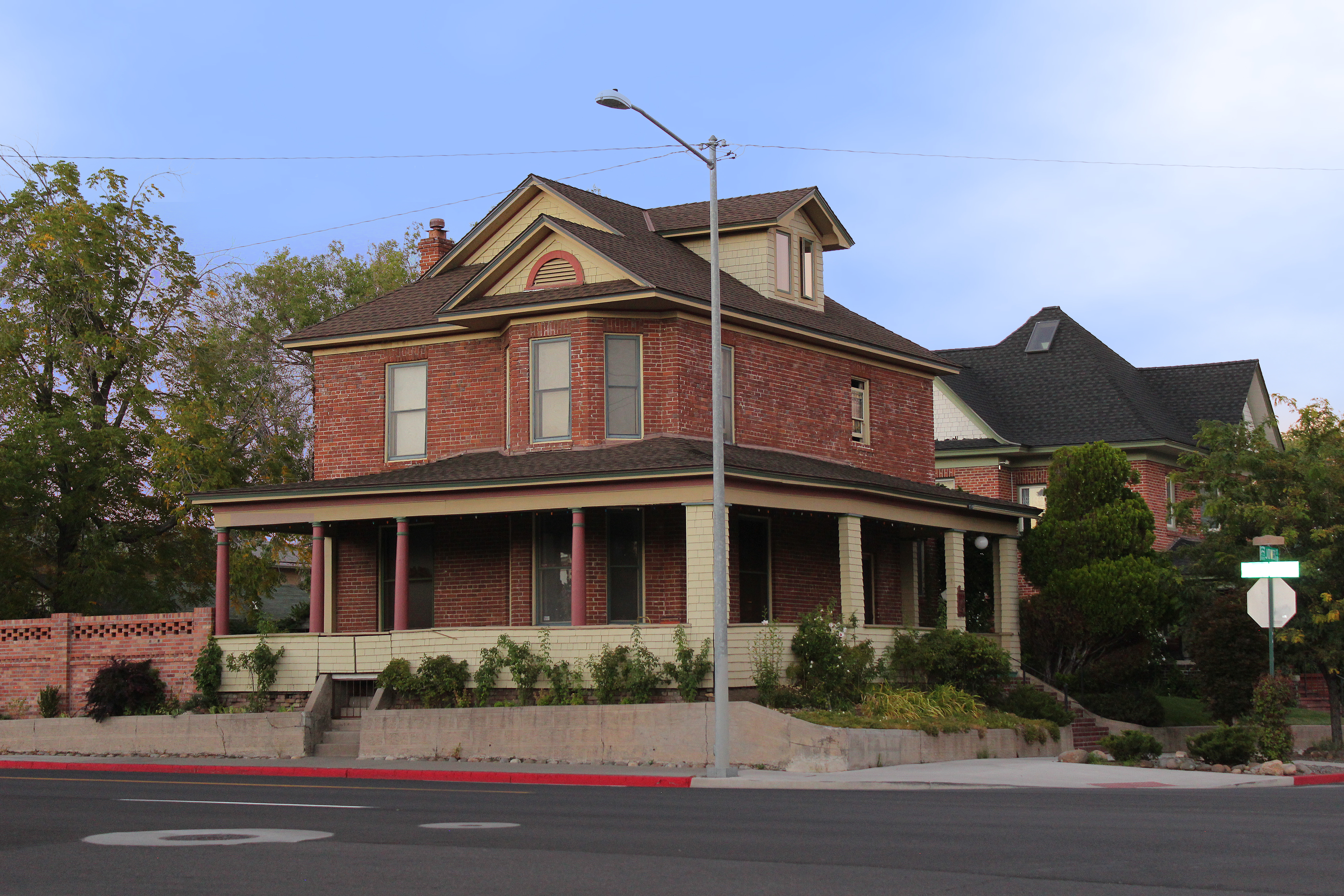

- Location within Nevada Location within the United States
- Location: 937 Jones St. Reno, Nevada
- Coordinates: 39°31′20″N 119°49′25″W
- Area: 0.2 acres (0.081 ha)
- Built: 1902
- Architectural style: Queen Anne
- NRHP reference No.: 03000749
- Added to NRHP: August 14, 2003

The Pearl Upson House, at 937 Jones St. in Reno, Nevada, United States, is a historic, two-story, red brick, simplified-Queen Anne-style house that was built in 1902. Also known as the Arrizabalaga House, it was listed on the National Register of Historic Places in 2003.

It was deemed significant "for the role it played in Reno's community planning and development history" and "as an excellent example of Queen Anne architecture, as the style was manifested in Reno". It was named in its NRHP nomination for Pearl Upson, the first occupant identifiable in city directories.
