= Washoe Valley, Nevada =

- Census-designated place
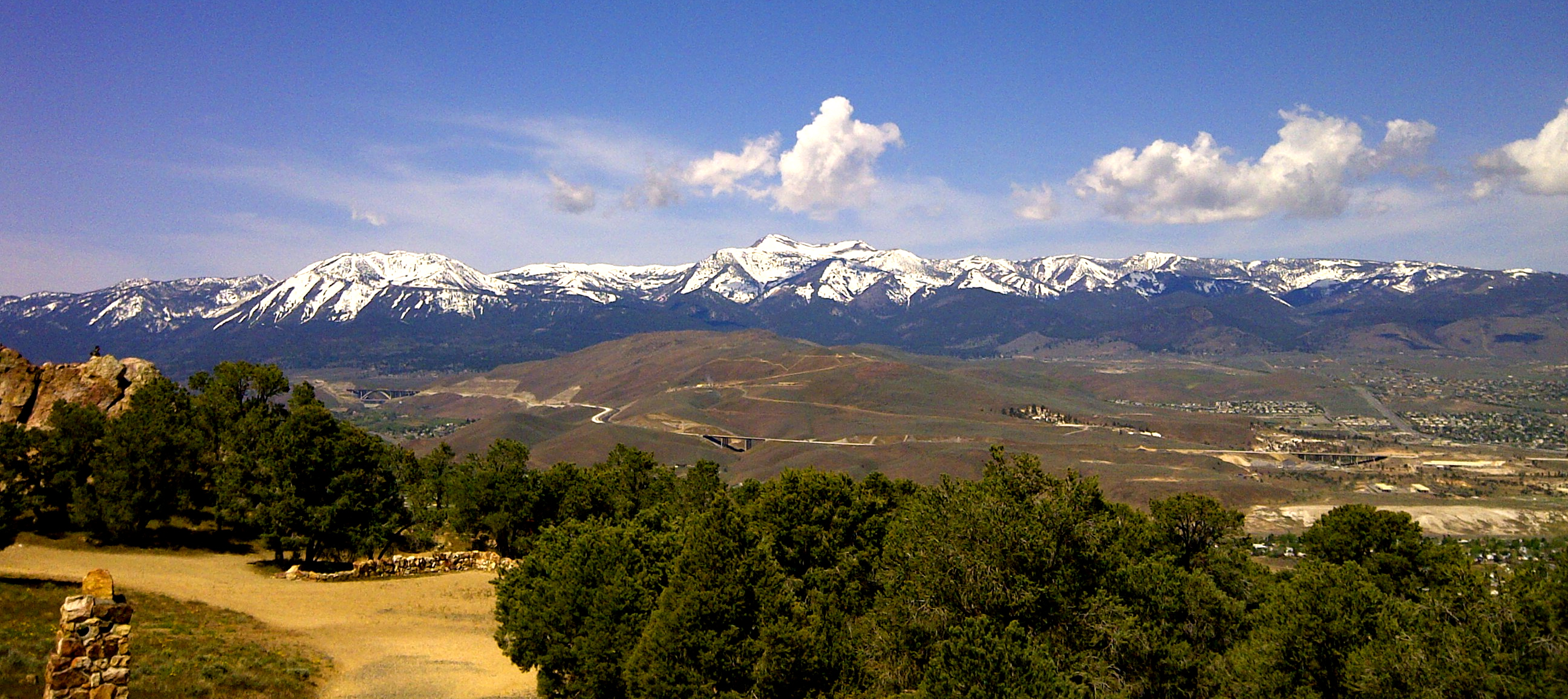
- Looking southwest from Geiger Grade toward Washoe Valley – May 22, 2011

- Location of Washoe Valley, Nevada
- Coordinates: 39°17′46″N 119°46′34″W
- Country: United States
- State: Nevada

Area
  - Total: 5.04 sq mi (13.05 km^{2})
  - Land: 5.04 sq mi (13.05 km^{2})
  - Water: 0 sq mi (0.00 km^{2})
- Elevation: 5,086 ft (1,550 m)

Population (2020)
  - Total: 3,074
  - Density: 609.9/sq mi (235.49/km^{2})
- Time zone: UTC-8 (Pacific (PST))
  - Summer (DST): UTC-7 (PDT)
- ZIP code: 89701, 89704
- Area code: 775
- FIPS code: 32-82250
- GNIS feature ID: 2629982

Washoe Valley is a census-designated place (CDP) in Washoe County, Nevada, United States. It corresponds closely to the unincorporated community of New Washoe City. As of the 2020 census, Washoe Valley had a population of 3,074. It is part of the Reno–Sparks Metropolitan Statistical Area. The CDP takes its name from the Washoe Valley, a region between Reno and Carson City centered on Washoe Lake.

== Geography ==
The Washoe Valley CDP is located at 39°17′46″N 119°46′33″W (39.2963, −119.7760), to the east of Washoe Lake. Eastlake Boulevard is the main road through the community, leading both north and south to U.S. Route 395, the main highway through the valley.

Washoe Valley is a very fire prone area. This is mostly due to the fire fueling vegetation and the topography, with several slopes in the area. Additionally, there is limited water residents can use to protect structures in the case of a fire.

According to the United States Census Bureau, the CDP has a total area of 5.1 square miles (13.1 km^{2}), all land.

== Demographics ==
Historical population
| Census | Pop. | Note | %± |
|---|---|---|---|
| 2010 | 3,019 | | — |
| 2020 | 3,074 | | 1.8% |
U.S. Decennial Census

=== 2020 census ===
As of the 2020 census, Washoe Valley had a population of 3,074. The median age was 55.1 years. 15.5% of residents were under the age of 18 and 29.5% of residents were 65 years of age or older. For every 100 females there were 101.7 males, and for every 100 females age 18 and over there were 101.9 males age 18 and over.

0.0% of residents lived in urban areas, while 100.0% lived in rural areas.

There were 1,273 households in Washoe Valley, of which 21.1% had children under the age of 18 living in them. Of all households, 54.4% were married-couple households, 18.4% were households with a male householder and no spouse or partner present, and 18.0% were households with a female householder and no spouse or partner present. About 24.2% of all households were made up of individuals and 13.0% had someone living alone who was 65 years of age or older.

There were 1,341 housing units, of which 5.1% were vacant. The homeowner vacancy rate was 1.2% and the rental vacancy rate was 4.4%.

Racial composition as of the 2020 census
| Race | Number | Percent |
|---|---|---|
| White | 2,596 | 84.5% |
| Black or African American | 17 | 0.6% |
| American Indian and Alaska Native | 24 | 0.8% |
| Asian | 31 | 1.0% |
| Native Hawaiian and Other Pacific Islander | 3 | 0.1% |
| Some other race | 66 | 2.1% |
| Two or more races | 337 | 11.0% |
| Hispanic or Latino (of any race) | 206 | 6.7% |

=== 2010 census ===
As of the census of 2010, there were 3,019 people, 1,249 households, and 868 families residing in the CDP. The population density was 592.0 people per square mile (228.6 people/km^{2}). There were 1,311 housing units at an average density of 257.1 per square mile (99.3/km^{2}). The racial makeup of the CDP was 93.6% White, 0.5% African American, 0.9% Native American, 0.9% Asian, 0.1% Native Hawaiian or Other Pacific Islander, 1.5% some other race, and 2.6% from two or more races. Hispanic or Latino of any race were 5.1% of the population.

There were 1,249 households, out of which 25.1% had children under the age of 18 living with them, 58.4% were headed by married couples living together, 7.6% had a female householder with no husband present, and 30.5% were non-families. 22.6% of all households were made up of individuals, and 7.3% were someone living alone who was 65 years of age or older. The average household size was 2.42, and the average family size was 2.84.

In the CDP, the population was spread out, with 18.1% under the age of 18, 5.3% from 18 to 24, 18.3% from 25 to 44, 43.2% from 45 to 64, and 15.4% who were 65 years of age or older. The median age was 50.0 years. For every 100 females, there were 96.9 males. For every 100 females age 18 and over, there were 97.4 males.

=== Income and poverty ===
For the period 2007–2011, the estimated median annual income for a household in the CDP was $75,323, and the median income for a family was $85,375. Male full-time workers had a median income of $58,889 versus $36,083 for females. The per capita income for the CDP was $33,186. About 3.7% of families and 6.2% of the population were below the poverty line, including 6.4% of those under age 18 and 3.1% of those age 65 or over.

== Notable people ==
- Greg LeMond
