= Robison House (Sparks, Nevada) =

Historic house in Nevada, United States

- U.S. National Register of Historic Places
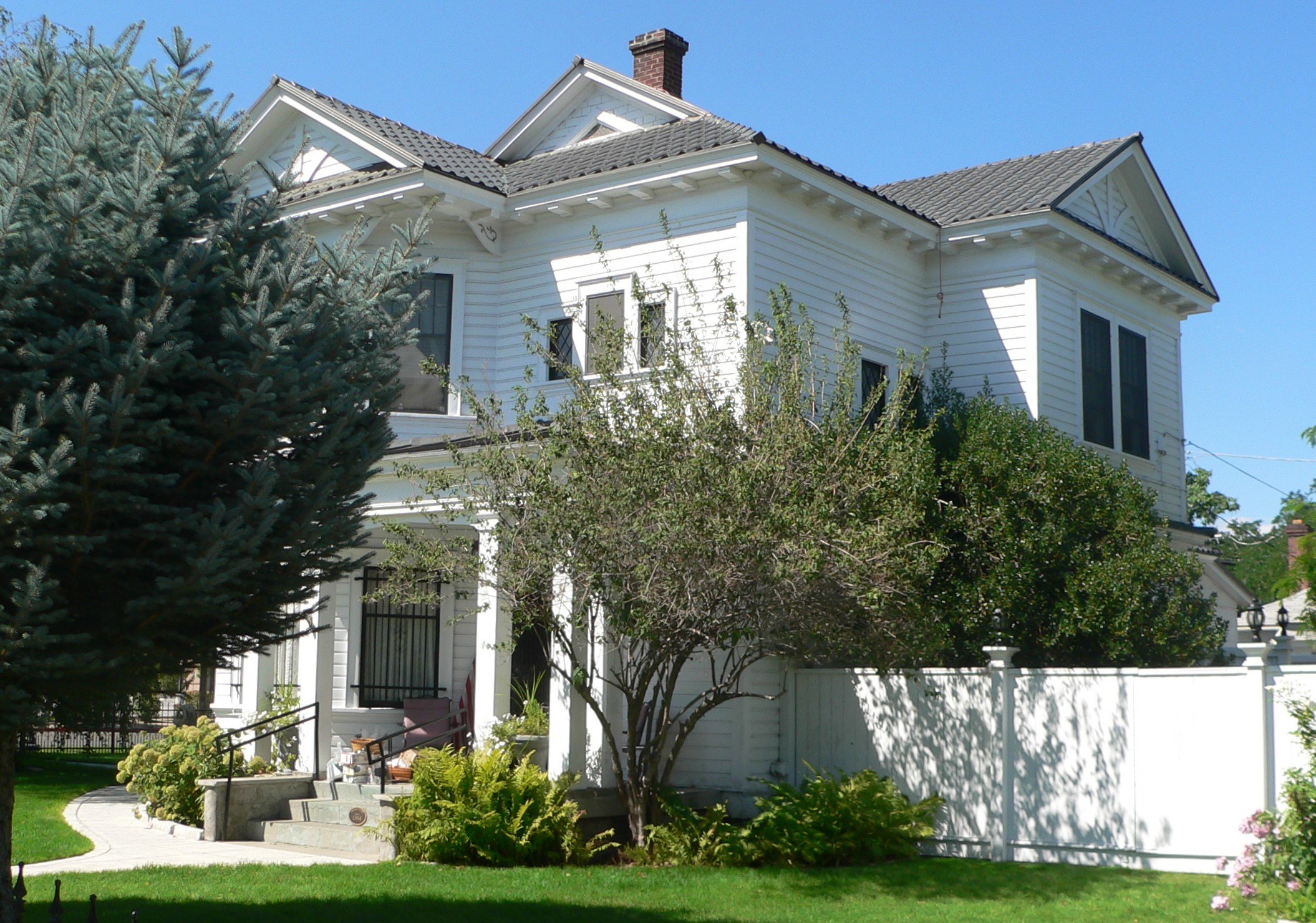
- View from the southeast

- Location within Nevada Location within the United States
- Location: 409 13th St., Sparks, Nevada
- Coordinates: 39°32′13.7″N 119°45′34.85″W
- Area: 0.3 acres (0.12 ha)
- Built: c.1904
- Architectural style: Colonial Revival
- NRHP reference No.: 06000895
- Added to NRHP: September 29, 2006

The Robison House in Sparks, Nevada, at 409 13th St., is a historic mansion-like house with Colonial Revival elements built c. 1904. The property includes small rental cottages used in Reno, Nevada's "divorce trade". It is listed on the National Register of Historic Places (NRHP).

The house, within George W. Robison's "Robison's Addition" development, seems to have been built for George W.'s son George A. Robison. The neighborhood was developed after the Central Pacific Railroad moved shops nearby. Images of this house were used in marketing lots in the development. The NRHP nomination cites Buildings of Nevada as stating: "'The image of the two-story, wood-frame dwelling with its pedimented gables and bracketed eaves no doubt lent an air of respectability to Robison's speculative enterprise'" and describes that small secondary residences for rent are available, and apparently were in use from the late 1920s and the 1930s, providing the short, six-week residency required for "quickie" divorces in Nevada. The property was listed on the National Register of Historic Places in 2006. The listing included five contributing buildings.
