= Southside School (Reno, Nevada) =

- Southside Studio
- U.S. National Register of Historic Places
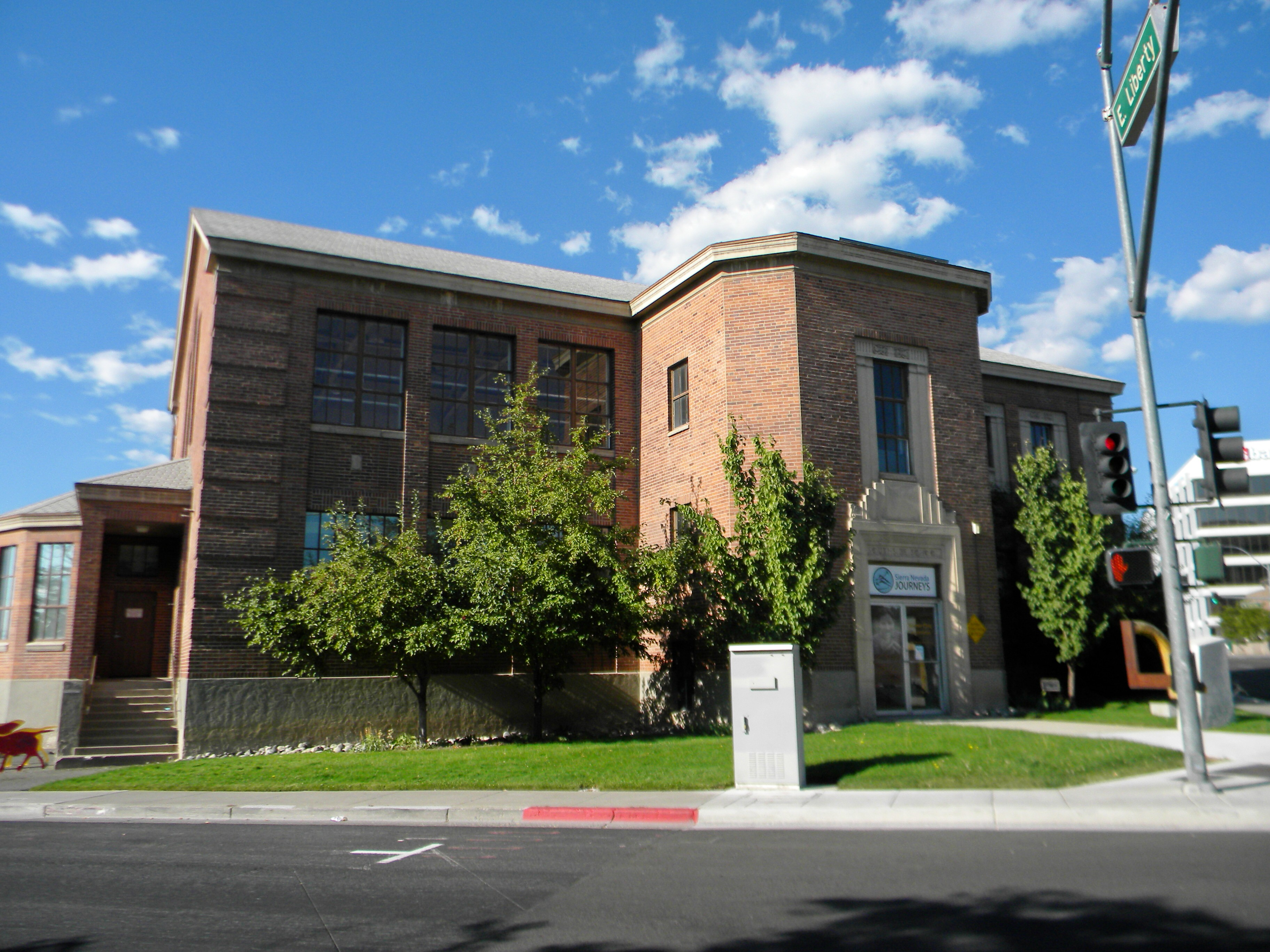

- Location within Nevada Location within the United States
- Location: 190 E. Liberty, Reno, Nevada
- Coordinates: 39°31′20″N 119°48′29″W
- Area: 2.2 acres (0.89 ha)
- Built: 1936
- Architectural style: Art Deco
- NRHP reference No.: 93000683
- Added to NRHP: August 5, 1993

The Southside Studio, formerly known as Southside School and Southside School Annex, at 190 E. Liberty in Reno, Nevada, was built in 1936 as an additional building to a 1903-built original building. Only the 1936 annex building survives. It was built with Works Progress Administration funding. It was listed on the National Register of Historic Places in 1993.

According to its NRHP nomination, it was deemed notable "for its association with events that have made a significant contribution to the broad patterns of our history" and also for "its embodiment of a regional interpretation of the Art Deco style in Nevada."

The building was leased to the University of Nevada, Reno in 2019 and officially opened in August 2021 as an expansion to the University of Nevada, Reno Innevation Center containing a robotics education center for K-12 students, a wood shop, and office space.
