= Crystal Bay, Nevada =

- Census-designated place
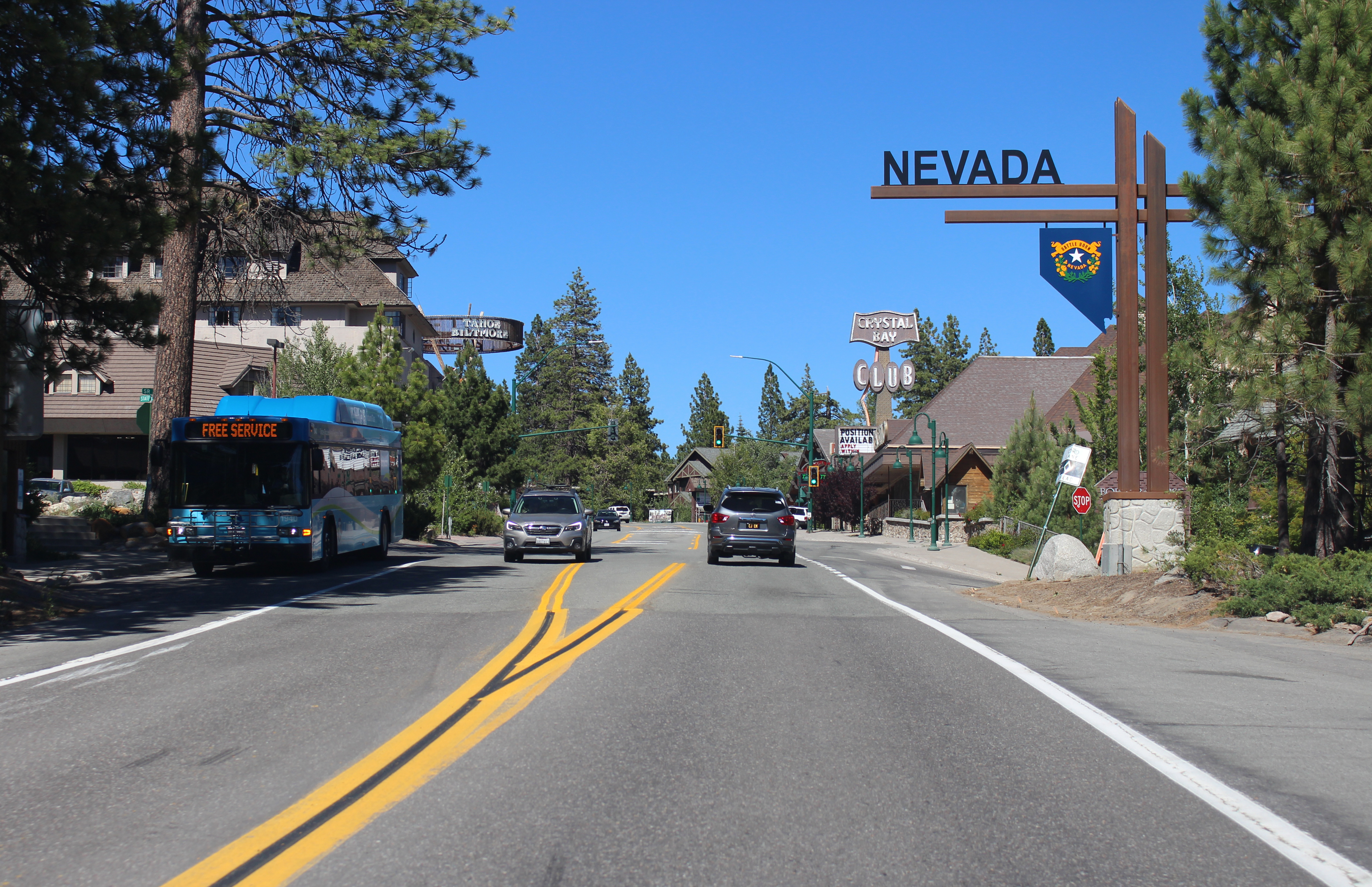
- Entering Crystal Bay via SR 28 from Kings Beach, California

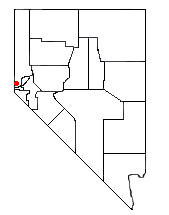
- Location of Crystal Bay, Nevada
- Coordinates: 39°13′40″N 120°0′16″W
- Country: United States
- State: Nevada

Area
  - Total: 0.78 sq mi (2.02 km^{2})
  - Land: 0.45 sq mi (1.17 km^{2})
  - Water: 0.33 sq mi (0.85 km^{2})
- Elevation: 6,273 ft (1,912 m)

Population (2020)
  - Total: 337
  - Density: 747.4/sq mi (288.57/km^{2})
- Time zone: UTC-8 (Pacific (PST))
  - Summer (DST): UTC-7 (PDT)
- ZIP code: 89402
- Area code: 775
- FIPS code: 32-16700
- GNIS feature ID: 2583915

Crystal Bay is a census-designated place (CDP) located on the north shore of Lake Tahoe in Washoe County, Nevada, United States. As of the 2020 census, Crystal Bay had a population of 337. It is part of the Reno−Sparks Metropolitan Statistical Area. Prior to 2010, it was listed by the U.S. Census Bureau within the Incline Village–Crystal Bay CDP.

== Geography ==
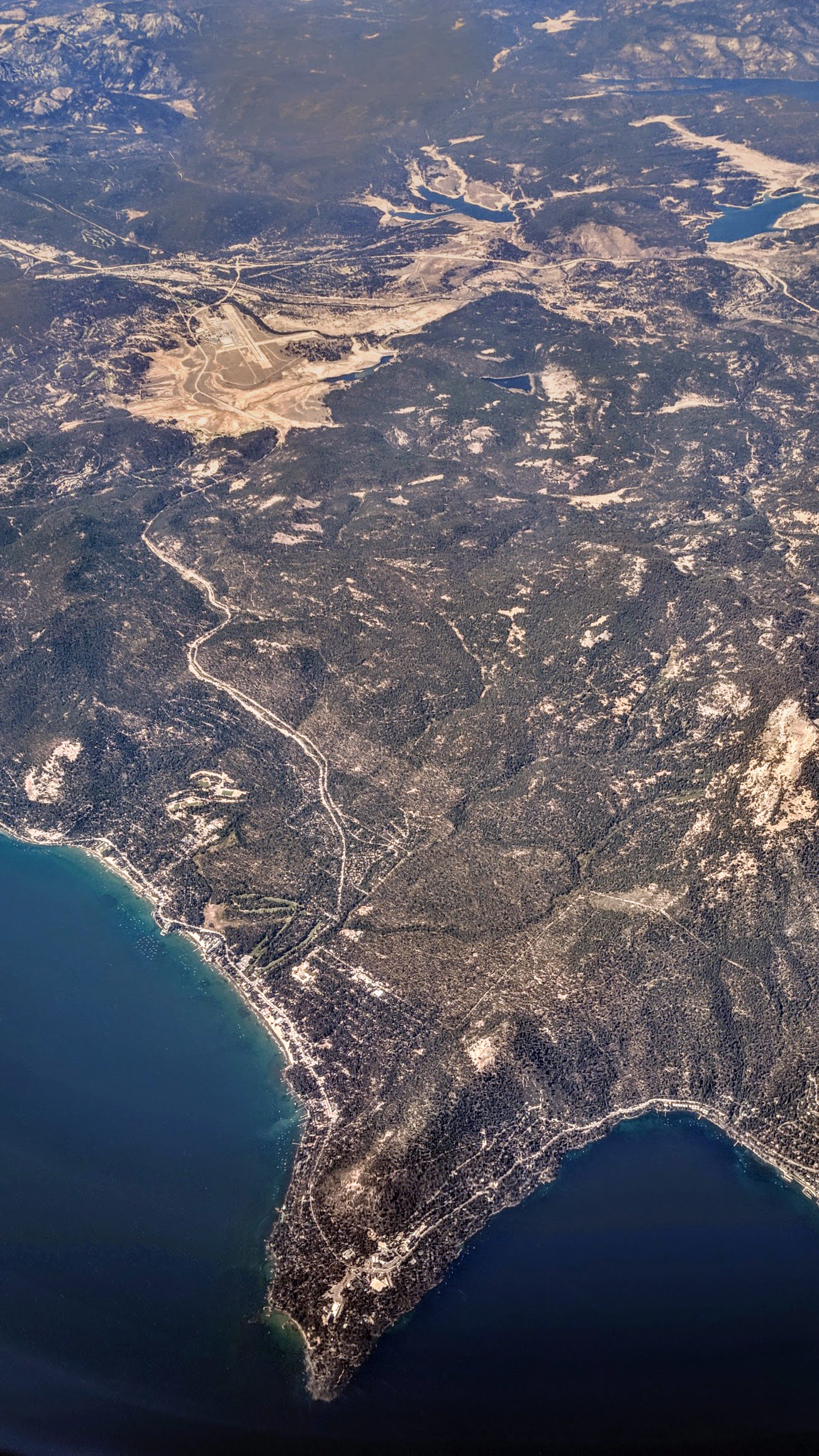
Aerial view from the south of Crystal Bay, the road to Truckee Airport, with Prosser Creek Reservoir and Boca Reservoir and Stampede Reservoir in the distance

Elevation ranges from 6,229 feet (1,899 m) on the shore of Lake Tahoe to over 6,800 feet (2,100 m) above sea level. The CDP is located on the north shore of Lake Tahoe, adjacent to the California state line.

According to the United States Census Bureau, the CDP has a total area of 0.77 square miles (2.0 km^{2}), of which 0.46 square miles (1.2 km^{2}) is land and 0.31 square miles (0.8 km^{2}), or 42.12%, is water.

== Climate ==
Crystal Bay has a humid continental climate (Dsb) with warm to hot summers with cool nights and moderately cold winters with frigid nights.

Climate data for Incline Village–Crystal Bay, Nevada
Month	Jan	Feb	Mar	Apr	May	Jun	Jul	Aug	Sep	Oct	Nov	Dec	Year
Mean daily maximum °F (°C)	39.4 (4.1)	40.6 (4.8)	44.2 (6.8)	49.3 (9.6)	58.1 (14.5)	65.7 (18.7)	73.2 (22.9)	73.4 (23.0)	68.4 (20.2)	59.7 (15.4)	49.5 (9.7)	42.1 (5.6)	55.3 (12.9)
Mean daily minimum °F (°C)	20.5 (−6.4)	23.7 (−4.6)	28.9 (−1.7)	36.3 (2.4)	41.0 (5.0)	47.7 (8.7)	54.1 (12.3)	54.0 (12.2)	47.3 (8.5)	42.6 (5.9)	30.6 (−0.8)	22.3 (−5.4)	37.4 (3.0)
Average precipitation inches (mm)	2.95 (74.93)	3.19 (81.12)	2.48 (62.88)	1.38 (35.00)	1.80 (45.67)	1.03 (26.28)	0.37 (9.49)	0.60 (15.33)	0.97 (24.52)	2.14 (54.37)	3.22 (81.78)	2.96 (75.25)	23.09 (586.62)
Source: National Weather Service

== Demographics ==
Historical population
Census	Pop.	Note	%±
2020	337		—
U.S. Decennial Census

== Education ==
The region is served by the Washoe County School District.

== See also ==
- List of census-designated places in Nevada
