= National Register of Historic Places listings in Douglas County, Nevada =

Map of Nevada highlighting Douglas County

Contents: List of Registered Historic Places in Douglas County, Nevada, USA:

The locations of National Register properties and districts (at least for all showing latitude and longitude coordinates below), may be seen in an online map by clicking on "Map of all coordinates".

This National Park Service list is complete through NPS recent listings posted September 4, 2026.

Contents: Counties in Nevada / See also: Nevada state-wide list
- Carson City
- Churchill
- Clark
- Douglas
- Elko
- Esmeralda
- Eureka
- Humboldt
- Lander
- Lincoln
- Lyon
- Mineral
- Nye
- Pershing
- Storey
- Washoe
- White Pine

== Current listings ==
	Name on the Register	Image	Date listed	Location	City or town	Description
1	Carson Valley Hospital	Carson Valley Hospital	May 29, 1979 (#79001462)	1466 U.S. Route 395; 38°56′34″N 119°45′02″W	Gardnerville	
2	Carson Valley Improvement Club Hall	Carson Valley Improvement Club Hall	August 4, 1983 (#83004184)	1606 Esmeralda Ave. 38°57′12″N 119°45′49″W	Minden	
3	de'ek wadapush (Cave Rock) Traditional Cultural Property	de'ek wadapush (Cave Rock) Traditional Cultural Property	January 31, 2017 (#100000610)	United States Route 50 north of Stateline; 39°02′48″N 119°56′53″W	Lincoln Park vicinity	
4	Douglas County Courthouse	Douglas County Courthouse	August 6, 1986 (#86002266)	1616 8th St. 38°57′20″N 119°45′48″W	Minden	
5	Douglas County High School	Douglas County High School	March 9, 1992 (#92000117)	1477 U.S. Route 395; 38°56′37″N 119°45′02″W	Gardnerville	
6	Farmers Bank of Carson Valley	Farmers Bank of Carson Valley	August 6, 1986 (#86002264)	1597 Esmeralda Ave. 38°57′13″N 119°45′45″W	Minden	
7	Farmer's Bank of Carson Valley	Farmer's Bank of Carson Valley	April 6, 2000 (#00000338)	1596 Esmeralda Ave. 38°57′10″N 119°45′47″W	Minden	
8	Friday's Station	Friday's Station	October 9, 1986 (#86003259)	U.S. Route 50 between Kingsbury Grade and Loop Rd. 38°57′50″N 119°56′05″W	Stateline	
9	Lena N. Gale Cabin	Lena N. Gale Cabin	June 12, 2001 (#01000586)	726 Cedar St. 39°00′12″N 119°56′56″W	Zephyr Cove	
10	Gardnerville Branch Jail	Gardnerville Branch Jail	May 16, 2003 (#03000415)	1440 Courthouse St. 38°56′29″N 119°44′30″W	Gardnerville	
11	Gardnerville Elementary School	Gardnerville Elementary School	February 19, 2008 (#08000033)	1290 Toler Ave. 38°56′23″N 119°44′38″W	Gardnerville	(School Buildings in Nevada MPS)
12	Genoa Historic District	Genoa Historic District	April 16, 1975 (#75001108)	7 miles northwest of Minden on State Route 57; 39°00′18″N 119°50′35″W	Genoa	
13	Home Ranch	Home Ranch	December 5, 1980 (#80002466)	West of Minden; 38°56′54″N 119°47′20″W	Minden	
14	It-goom-mum teh-weh-weh ush-shah-ish		February 1, 2016 (#15001029)	Address restricted	Dresslerville	
15	Arendt Jensen House	Arendt Jensen House	March 8, 1989 (#89000126)	1431 Ezell St. 38°56′31″N 119°44′29″W	Gardnerville	
16	Arendt Jensen, Jr. House	Arendt Jensen, Jr. House	December 1, 1994 (#94001405)	1243 A and 1243 B Eddie St. 38°56′32″N 119°44′46″W	Gardnerville	
17	Jobs Peak Ranch		January 11, 2001 (#00001639)	144 Summit Ridge Way; 38°53′49″N 119°50′56″W	Genoa	
18	Lake Shore House		October 4, 1979 (#79001463)	Glenbrook Rd; 39°05′18″N 119°56′18″W	Glenbrook	
19	Wilhelm and William Lampe Ranch	Wilhelm and William Lampe Ranch	April 12, 2018 (#100001620)	1335 Centerville Ln. 38°56′03″N 119°44′56″W	Gardnerville	
20	Minden Butter Manufacturing Company	Minden Butter Manufacturing Company	August 6, 1986 (#86002263)	1617 Water St. 38°57′20″N 119°45′48″W	Minden	
21	Minden Elementary School	Minden Elementary School	February 19, 2008 (#08000034)	1638 Mono Ave. 38°57′14″N 119°46′01″W	Minden	(School Buildings in Nevada MPS)
22	Minden Flour Milling Company	Minden Flour Milling Company	November 14, 1978 (#78001721)	6th St. and U.S. Route 395; 38°57′18″N 119°45′46″W	Minden	
23	Minden Inn	Minden Inn	August 6, 1986 (#86002262)	1594 Esmeralda Ave. 38°57′11″N 119°45′44″W	Minden	
24	Minden Wool Warehouse	Minden Wool Warehouse	August 6, 1986 (#86002261)	1615 Railroad Ave. 38°57′19″N 119°45′51″W	Minden	
25	Reese-Johnson-Virgin House	Reese-Johnson-Virgin House	July 21, 2004 (#04000728)	193 Genoa Ln. 39°00′12″N 119°50′40″W	Genoa	
26	TAHOE (Shipwreck)	TAHOE (Shipwreck)	February 11, 2004 (#04000026)	Lake Tahoe; 39°05′29″N 119°57′08″W	Glenbrook	

== See also ==
- List of National Historic Landmarks in Nevada
- National Register of Historic Places listings in Nevada
