= Veterans Memorial School =

Veterans Memorial School or Veterans' Memorial School may refer to:

- Veterans Memorial Elementary School - Reno, Nevada - Washoe County School District (listed as "Veterans Memorial School" on the National Register of Historic Places)
- Veterans' Memorial School - Union City, New Jersey - Union City School District (New Jersey)
- Veterans' Memorial School - Gloucester, Massachusetts - Gloucester Public Schools

== See also ==
- Veterans Memorial Elementary School (disambiguation)
- Veterans Memorial Middle School - Vineland, New Jersey - Vineland Public Schools
