= Sarah Jim Mayo =

Washoe basket weaver (1858–1918)

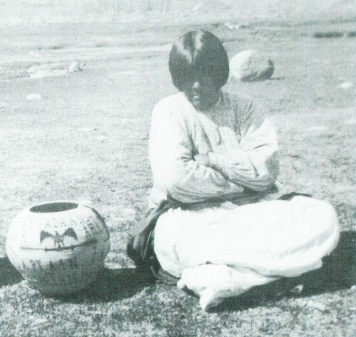
- Mayo with the Presentation Basket in 1914
- Born: 1858; Carson Valley, Utah Territory, U.S.
- Died: December 1918 (aged 60); Gardnerville, Nevada, U.S.
- Known for: Basket weaving
- Notable work: Presentation Basket
- Movement: Arts and Crafts
- Spouses: Big George (sep. 1888); Tom Sanco (m. 1888; sep. 1896); Captain Pete Mayo (m. 1900–1918)
- Children: 4
- Patrons: Margaretta Dressler

Sarah Jim Mayo (1858 – December 1918) was a Washoe basket weaver. The daughter of the tribal leader Captain Jim Henukeha, Mayo rose to prominence in the early 1900s for her innovations in basketry. She is credited with expanding the traditionally simple Washoe baskets to include a wide palette of colors and pictorial designs. Baskets created by Mayo were delivered to Presidents Theodore Roosevelt and Woodrow Wilson.

== Biography ==
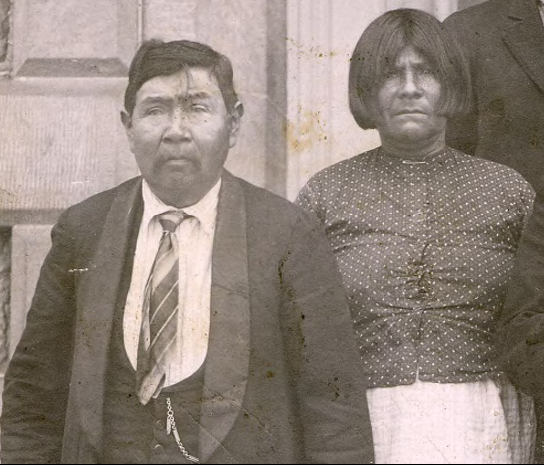
Sarah Jim and Captain Pete Mayo in 1917

=== Early life ===
Sarah Jim Mayo was born in 1858 in the traditional Washoe lands of the Carson Valley of Nevada. She was the youngest daughter of Captain Jim, (Note: "Captain" is the term which replaced the Washoe word for chief; it is derived from the term given to railroad crew leaders.) also known by his traditional name He'nu-keha, the principal chief of the Washoe people and an ally of the United States government in the region. During the Paiute War of 1860, Captain Jim was instrumental in ensuring peace between the Washoe and the white settlers after he surrendered his firearms. Captain Jim died in 1868.

Throughout her life, Mayo followed the typical Washoe transhumant migration patterns. In the spring and summer, the Washoe would camp on the southern shore of Lake Tahoe, near the modern-day Tallac Village, California, where they would cater to the large tourist population. In the winter, the Washoe returned to the Carson Valley; however, as much of the Carson Valley became claimed by white ranchers, the Washoe needed to seek employment in order to obtain permission to camp on their traditional lands. Mayo worked as a domestic servant at ranch houses, and she would make and sell traditional Washoe baskets to both tourists and ranchers.

Mayo was married three times. When she was young, she married a man named Big George and had two children with him. They separated in 1888, and she soon after married a man named Tom Sanco. She and Sanco had one child together, and Mayo had another child out of wedlock. Sanco left her in 1896. In 1900, she married Captain Pete Mayo, a Washoe chief and the father of Maggie Mayo James, who would later also become a famous basket weaver. Through this marriage, she achieved considerable political influence and argued for her husband's authority based on her descent from Captain Jim.

=== Baskets ===
Mayo's style of basket weaving was inspired by Dat So La Lee, a prominent contemporary Washoe weaver, with Mayo imitating her degikup style. (Note: Degikup was "a large spherical shaped basket with a flat base and a small opening".) Despite drawing inspiration from her, Mayo's baskets are described as being the complete "antithesis" of Dat So La Lee's. Whereas Dat So La Lee's baskets contained finely stitched simple motifs in contrasting colors with few pictures, Mayo's baskets feature large complex motifs with combinations of colors for "greater richness, solidity, and depth". Mayo's works also feature expansive sets of images and settings containing full narratives, with more attention given to the difficulty of the design than the stitching itself. Mayo expanded the traditional Washoe color scheme, which consisted solely of black and red, to include brown, yellow, green, gray, and pink. She also combined multiple colors together in a single motif, which resulted in rich and dramatic patterns.

Among her most significant innovations was the introduction of pictorial images into Washoe basketry. Between 1905 and 1910, Mayo began including representative figures into her baskets, such as "trees, butterflies, eagles, horses, houses, and arrows". These images were placed "without concern for logic of placement or scale"; for example, she would place "equal-sized images of a horse and an eagle in opposing branches of an asymmetrical tree to create a balanced composition". This is in contrast to other weavers, who wove symmetrical geometric designs, and is regarded as "a staggering technical achievement". She also incorporated illusions into her designs, such as leaves overlapping a branch. In 1913, Mayo again expanded her pictorial designs to include humans and architecture. Her human figures were "structured on gender archetypes, contrasting male and female roles in Washoe society"; for example, men were portrayed as hunting deer, while women were portrayed gathering plants and caring for children. Mayo also included satirical images of white people into some designs, including one portrayal of "slim-waisted Victorian ladies holding parasols, standing near a fort with its American flag flying". Due to the complexity of her designs, Mayo is described as having been a "master weaver".

Mayo was very influential in the development of Washoe basketry. Between 1910 and 1925, most Washoe weavers imitated her pictorial images and color palette. Mayo was also credited with introducing a "one-rod technique for the degikup rather than the traditional three-rod". Though Washoe weavers began rejecting the use of figurative images after 1925, they still retained her "alternation of two large-scale designs as the major format". Mayo also influenced weavers from other tribes in the region, including Lucy Telles and Daisy Charley of the Kucadɨkadɨ and Yosemite Miwok groups. Many of Mayo's baskets remain in museums and collections across the Southwestern United States, including at the Nevada Museum of Art in Reno and in the personal collection of Congressman James David Santini. A collection of her baskets were also presented to President Theodore Roosevelt while he was in office. Mayo's baskets became so widely recorded and disseminated partially due to the patronage of Margaretta Dressler, whose husband William F. Dressler was a prominent rancher and state senator from the Carson City area. Unlike the typically exploitative relationship between a white patron and a non-white artist, Dressler treated Mayo as an equal, and the two became genuine friends. Dressler collected, photographed, and documented many of Mayo's baskets, many of which survived due to Dressler's work. Dressler also took many personal photographs of Mayo.

=== Wilson basket ===
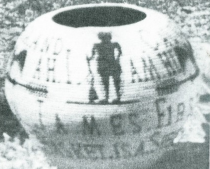
The Presentation Basket showing Captain Jim surrendering his rifle

Mayo wove her most famous basket in 1913. Dubbed the Presentation Basket, it was created for President Woodrow Wilson as a gift and political gesture to remind the United States government of the historical alliance with the Washoe. The basket was intended as a way to entice the government to send aid to the struggling Washoe tribe, whose population had decreased to just three hundred. The Washoe did not have a reservation, and the few lands they did nominally control were already claimed by ranchers. Without a reservation, the Washoe were also forced to purchase expensive hunting and fishing licenses.

The basket was "honey in color with dark brown and black symbols", and was coiled in the degikup style. It featured several innovative motifs, particularly the inclusion of an eagle with its wings spread over arrows, imitating the presidential seal. The basket also included human figures representing Mayo and her father. Captain Jim was portrayed standing on flat ground and surrendering his rifle, a symbol of the good-will established between the United States and the Washoe during the Paiute War. In contrast, Mayo portrayed herself "standing on a rounded hill, with its swelling, feminine form repeated in her dress". Mayo's inclusion of herself was controversial within the Washoe community, with some women accusing her of claiming high-status in the traditionally egalitarian society and ostracizing her due to allegations of witchcraft.

The basket included the following inscription:

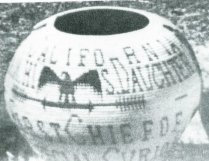
The Presentation Basket showing the eagle and arrows

Nevada and California
Sarah, I am his daughter
Captain James, First Chief of Washoe tribe
This basket is a special curio, 1913.

In March 1914, Mayo's husband Captain Pete Mayo, the leader of the Woodfords band (Hung A Lei Ti) of the Washoe, led a delegation of Washoe captains to Washington, D.C. to meet with President Wilson, deliver the basket, and negotiate a land grant for the Washoe. The basket was accompanied by a letter "explaining the rights and needs of the Washoe, again recalling the debt owed them by virtue of Captain Jim Henukeha's aid to whites and surrender of arms in 1860". Written by Dressler due to Mayo's illiteracy, the letter stated: "The committee presenting this memento desires that it be kept in the White House as a lasting token of the friendship of the Washoe Tribe towards the Whites, and as a reminder of a tribe now becoming rapidly extinct". It was signed by Mayo, her sister Agnes, and their husbands.

There are two accounts of what happened to the basket upon its arrival to Washington. According to American ethnographer Warren d'Azevedo, the basket was delivered to President Wilson, who wrote a letter to the Washoe expressing his thanks but took no further action to better their situation. Another account from a contemporary newspaper claimed that the basket was mistakenly delivered to the "president of the senate". (Note: It is unclear if this refers to the vice president, who holds the title president of the senate, or the president pro tempore.) Regardless of who the basket was delivered to, it disappeared soon after its arrival in Washington, and despite efforts by the Washoe to locate it, the basket was never found.

Soon after the basket was delivered, Congress passed a series of bills to aid the Washoe; however, it is unclear if the basket directly influenced this. Author Frank W. Porter notes that by the time the basket arrived in Washington, "Nevada's congressmen may have just introduced the bills". The legislation included the appropriation of $15,000 to the Washoe tribe, including $10,000 for the purchasing of homesteading lands. Despite these funds, the Washoe were unable to convince any local ranchers to sell their lands, besides the Dresslers, who sold a substantial portion of their ranchland. By 1917, the Washoe were able to purchase tracts of land in Carson City, Dresslerville, and Reno.

=== Death ===
Mayo died in December 1918 (Note: Some academic works state she died in 1925 or 1945. However, contemporary newspapers reported her death in December 1918.) at her home in Gardnerville, aged 60. By this point, her eyesight had begun to fail, and her husband died earlier in the year from the Spanish flu. Following her death, The Sacramento Bee wrote that "for more than forty years she was one of the best known Indian women in Nevada, and exercised a wide influence on the acceptance of the ways of the white men by her people".
