= Grace Dangberg =

American anthropologist (1896–1985)

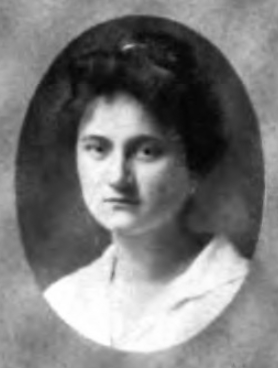
- Dangberg in the 1917 yearbook of the University of California
- Born: February 26, 1896; Nevada, U.S.
- Died: November 29, 1985 (aged 89); Palo Alto, California, U.S.
- Occupations: Anthropologist, local historian

Grace Melissa Dangberg (February 26, 1896 – November 29, 1985) was an American anthropologist, local historian, and writer, based in Nevada's Carson Valley.

== Early life and education ==
Dangberg was raised in Minden, Nevada, the daughter of John Bismark Dangberg and Georgia Beeding Dangberg. Her grandfather, H. F. Dangberg, was one of the European founders of her hometown, which is named for the city in Germany. She graduated from the University of California in 1917, and pursued further studies in anthropology there and at Columbia University. At California she studied with Alfred Kroeber and Robert Lowie; at Columbia, she worked more with Lowie, and with Franz Boas.

== Career ==
Dangberg was secretary and treasurer of the Dangberg Land and Livestock Company. She used her anthropological training to document the language and culture of the Washoe people in the Carson Valley. She was a founder of the Carson Valley Historical Society and the Genoa Court House Museum, and worked to preserve and archive local records. She was an active member of the American Anthropological Association in the 1920s.

In 1982 she established the Grace Dangberg Foundation, to support Nevada history projects. In 1984 she gave an oral history interview to the University of Nevada Oral History Project. She donated almost a million dollars to the University of Nevada, Reno.

== Publications ==
- Washoe Texts (1927)
- "Source Material for the History of the West" (1939, with William M. Maule)
- "Letters to Jack Wilson, the Paiute Prophet, written between 1908 and 1911" (1957)
- "Washoe Tales" and "Wovoka" (1968)
- Carson Valley (1972)
- "Conflict on the Carson: A Study of Water Litigation in Western Nevada" (1975)
- A Guide to the Life and Works of Frederick J. Teggart (1983)

== Personal life ==
Dangberg died in 1985, at the age of 89, in Palo Alto, California. The Nevada legislature marked her death with a Senate Joint Resolution detailing her achievements. There is a historical marker about Grace Dangberg in Minden, Nevada, erected in 1988.

== See also ==
- Dangberg Home Ranch Historic Park
