= Farmer's Bank of Carson Valley =

Farmer's Bank of Carson Valley may refer to the following bank buildings:

- Farmer's Bank of Carson Valley (1596 Esmeralda Avenue, Minden, Nevada), the first Farmer's Bank building in Minden
- Farmer's Bank of Carson Valley (1597 Esmeralda Avenue, Minden, Nevada), the second Farmer's Bank building in Minden
