= Gardnerville Branch Jail =

- U.S. National Register of Historic Places
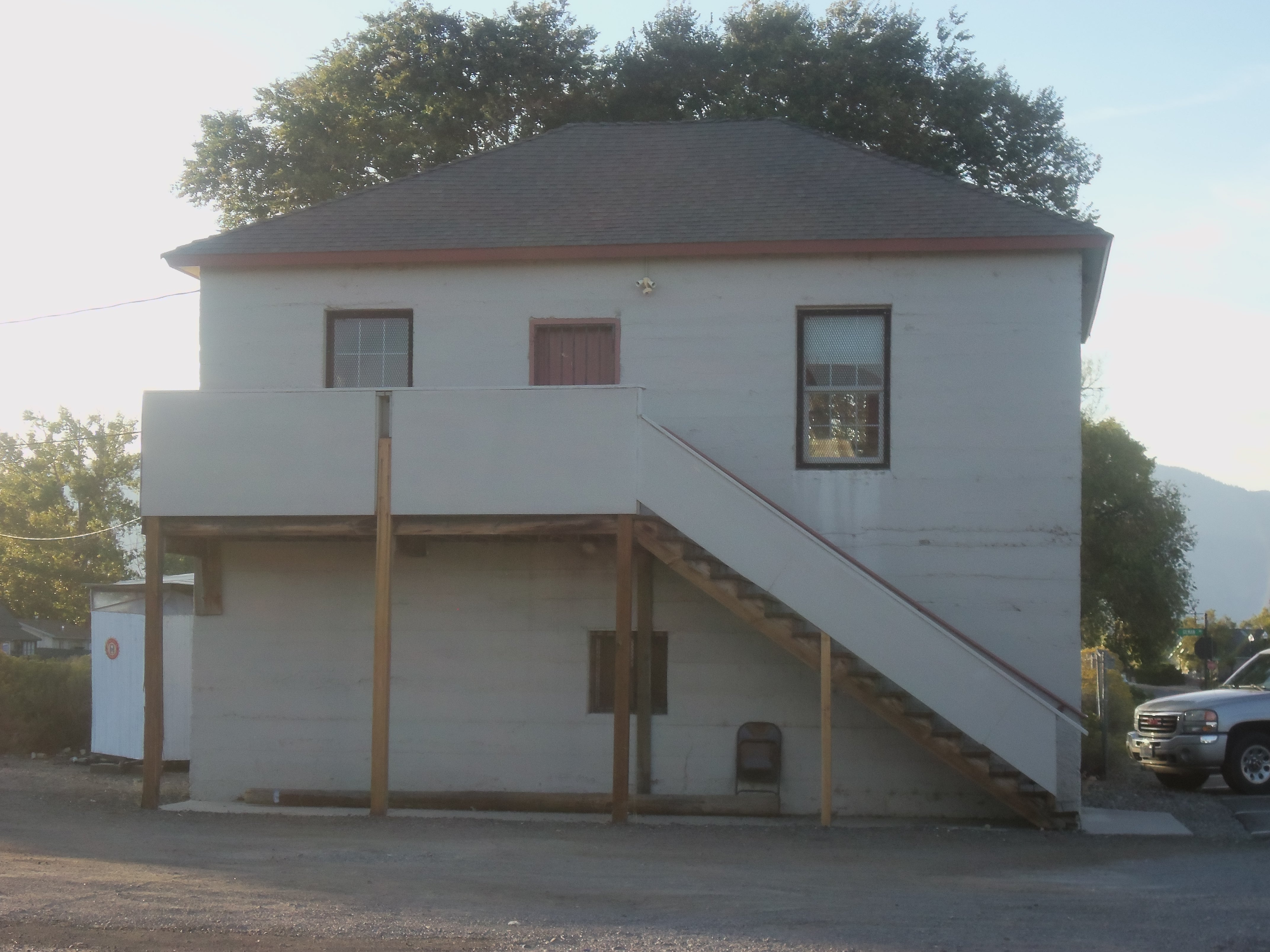

- Location within Nevada Location within the United States
- Location: 1440 Courthouse St., Gardnerville, Nevada
- Coordinates: 38°56′29″N 119°44′30″W
- Area: 0.1 acres (0.040 ha)
- Built: 1910
- Built by: Christensen & Madsen
- Architect: Louis Springmeyer
- Architectural style: Utilitarian
- NRHP reference No.: 03000415
- Added to NRHP: May 16, 2003

The Gardnerville Branch Jail is a historic jail located at 1440 Courthouse St. in Gardnerville, Nevada. The jail was built in 1910 and served as Douglas County's only jail from 1910 to 1915. Prior to 1910, the only county jail was in Genoa, the county seat; however, since Gardnerville was several miles from Genoa, it resorted to housing prisoners in the local judge's granary. As the granary was considered unfit for holding prisoners, the community petitioned the county to construct a new jail. However, local leaders in Minden, who wanted to move the county seat to their town, protested the move, as they suspected that Gardnerville was attempting to claim the county seat itself. Nonetheless, the county approved the construction of the new jail. The jail housed its first prisoners before construction even finished, as the Genoa jail burned down; one prisoner was briefly chained to a post until the new jail could accommodate him. Once completed, the jail served the county until 1915, when Minden became the county seat and opened its own county jail.

Once it no longer served as the county jail, the Gardnerville jail took on another, racially charged purpose. Gardnerville was a sundown town, and it rang a bell every night to order American Indians out of town. In addition, the unemployed were considered vagrants and were not allowed on the town's streets after dark. The jail housed violators of both of these policies until it closed in the 1950s.

The jail was added to the National Register of Historic Places on May 16, 2003.
