= Edward Parsons =

Edward Parsons may refer to:

- Edward Parsons (minister) (1762–1833), English Congregational minister and writer.
- Edward Y. Parsons (1842–1876), U.S. Representative from Kentucky
- Edward L. Parsons (1868–1960), American bishop in California
- Edward Parsons (footballer) (1879–1956), English footballer
- Edward Parsons (architect) (1907–1991), American architect in Nevada
- Edward Taylor Parsons (1861–1914), Sierra Club activist, for whom Parsons Memorial Lodge is named
