= Veterans Memorial Elementary School =

Veterans Memorial Elementary School may refer to:

- Veterans Memorial Elementary School - Reno, Nevada - Washoe County School District
- Veterans Memorial Elementary School - Laredo, Texas - United Independent School District
- Veterans Memorial Elementary School - Roma, Texas - Roma Independent School District
- Veterans' Memorial Elementary School - Gloucester, Massachusetts - Gloucester Public Schools
- Veterans Memorial Elementary School - Provincetown, Massachusetts - Provincetown Public Schools

== See also ==
- David C. Douglass Veterans Memorial School - Lower Township, New Jersey - Lower Township School District
