= Minden Elementary School =

- U.S. National Register of Historic Places
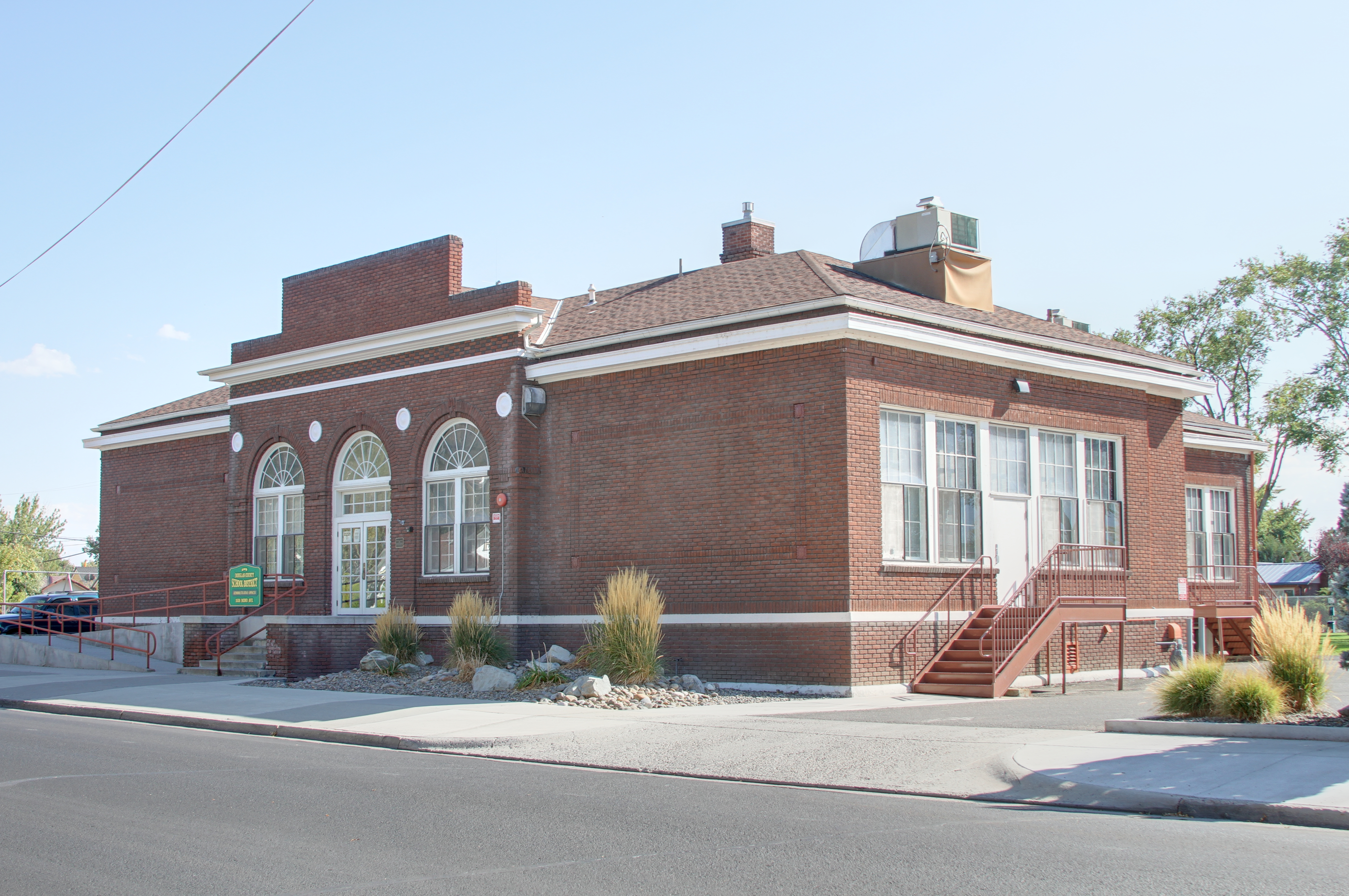

- Location within Nevada Location within the United States
- Location: 1638 Mono Ave., Minden, Nevada
- Coordinates: 38°57′14″N 119°46′04″W
- Area: 0.7 acres (0.28 ha)
- Architectural style: Renaissance
- MPS: School Buildings in Nevada MPS
- NRHP reference No.: 08000034
- Added to NRHP: February 19, 2008

Minden Elementary School, also known as Minden Grammar School, is a historic school building located at 1638 Mono Avenue in Minden, Nevada. The Renaissance Revival school was built in 1918 at a cost of $14,291. The school replaced the county's first school, a 1908 building known as the "little green schoolhouse". The school operated until it closed in 1980 and now serves as an office building for the Douglas County School District.

The school was added to the National Register of Historic Places in 2008, along with another Douglas County school, the Gardnerville Elementary School.
