= J. Clarence Kind House =

Historic house in Nevada, United States

- U.S. National Register of Historic Places
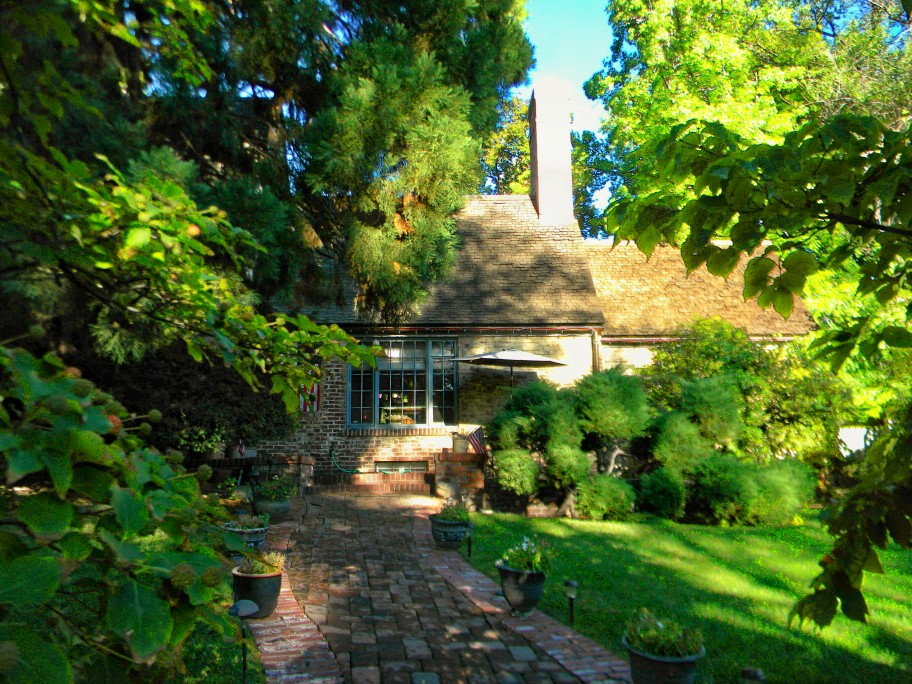

- Location within Nevada
- Location: 751 Marsh Ave., Reno, Nevada
- Coordinates: 39°31′6″N 119°49′18″W
- Area: 3,700-square-foot (340 m^{2})
- Built: 1934
- Architect: Mills, Russell; Parsons, Edward
- Architectural style: Tudor Revival
- NRHP reference No.: 05001121
- Added to NRHP: October 5, 2005

The J. Clarence Kind House, at 751 Marsh Ave. in Reno, Nevada, United States, is an historic Tudor Revival-style house that was built in 1934. Also known as the William Forman Home, it was listed on the National Register of Historic Places (NRHP) in 2005.

It is a large, 3,700-square-foot (340 m^{2}) house. According to its NRHP nomination, it was deemed significant "for its role in Reno's community planning and development history" and "as an excellent local example of the Tudor/Cotswold Cottage style of architecture, within the broader category of Period Revival, and as representing the work of two local master architects, Russell Mills and Edward Parsons."
