= Russell Mills (architect) =

American architect

Russell Mills (1892-1959) was an American architect based in Reno, Nevada. A number of his works are listed on the U.S. National Register of Historic Places. He "spent early years" in the Philippines. He worked as a draftsman for noted architect Frederic DeLongchamps.

He opened his own practice in about 1936.

He was one of the first members of the Nevada State Board of Architecture. Works include:

- Jobs Peak Ranch, 144 Summit Ridge Way, Genoa, Nevada (Mills, Russell), NRHP-listed. Perhaps Mills' first commission, in Swiss chalet style.
- J. Clarence Kind House, 751 Marsh Ave., Reno, Nevada (Mills, Russell), NRHP-listed
- Veteran's Elementary Memorial School (1949), 1200 Locust St., Reno, Nevada (Mills, Russell), NRHP-listed Moderne
- Vocational-Agriculture Building, 1170 Elmhurst St., Lovelock, Nevada (Mills, Russell), NRHP-listed
- Palmer Engineering Building, at University of Nevada, Reno
