= Sundown town =

All-white municipalities that practice a form of racial segregation

Sundown towns, also known as sunset towns, gray towns, or sundowner towns, were all-White municipalities or neighborhoods in the United States and Canada that practiced a form of racial segregation by excluding non-whites via some combination of discriminatory local laws, intimidation or violence. They were most prevalent before the 1950s. The term came into use because of signs that directed "colored people" to leave town by sundown.

Sundown counties and sundown suburbs were created as well. While sundown laws became illegal following the passage of the Civil Rights Act of 1968, some commentators argue that certain 21st-century practices perpetuate a modified version of the sundown town. Some of these modern practices include racial profiling by local police and sheriff's departments, vandalism of public art, harassment by private citizens, and gentrification.

Specific examples of exclusion of Native Americans, Asians, Latinos, Jews, and Catholics alongside many other communities include towns such as Minden and Gardnerville, Nevada, in which sirens were used from 1917 until 1974 to signal Native Americans to leave town by 6:30 p.m. each evening, a practice that symbolically persisted into the 21st century. In Antioch, California, Chinese residents faced curfews as early as 1851, and in 1876, a mob destroyed the Chinatown district, prompting a mass exodus that left only a small number of Chinese residents by the mid-20th century. Mexican Americans were excluded from Midwestern sundown towns through racially restrictive housing covenants, signs (often posted within the same infamous "No Blacks, No Dogs" signs), and police harassment. Additionally, Jews and Catholics were unwelcome in certain communities, with some towns explicitly prohibiting them from owning property or joining local clubs.

Black Americans were also affected through widespread and often well-documented exclusionary policies. These discriminatory policies and actions distinguish sundown towns from towns that have no Black residents for demographic reasons. Historically, towns have been confirmed as sundown towns by newspaper articles, county histories, and Works Progress Administration files; this information has been corroborated by tax or U.S. census records showing an absence of Black people or a sharp drop in the Black population between two censuses.

== History ==
The earliest legal restrictions on the nighttime activities and movements of African Americans and other racial minorities date back to the colonial era. The general court and legislative assembly of the Province of New Hampshire passed "An Act to Prevent Disorders in the Night" in 1714:

Whereas great disorders, insolencies and burglaries are oft times raised and committed in the night time by Indian, Negro, and Molatto Servants and Slaves to the Disquiet and hurt of her Majesty's subjects, No Indian, Negro, or Molatto is to be from Home after 9 o'clock.

Notices emphasizing and re-affirming the curfew were published in The New Hampshire Gazette in 1764 and 1771. Following the American Revolutionary War, Virginia was the first U.S. state to prohibit the entry of all Free Negros. In the Northwest Territory, which existed from 1787 to 1803, local authorities across the region imposed special regulations on free Black Americans migrating to the territory, known as "black laws"; these included requiring them to register themselves with county officials and post bonds "designed to ensure that they would not become dependent on public relief." As noted by the historian Kate Masur, "many Americans–in free states and slave states alike–viewed laws that imposed special regulations on free people of African or Native American descent as just another appropriate use of the police power."

Following the end of the Reconstruction era, thousands of towns and counties across the United States became sundown localities, as part of the imposition of Jim Crow laws and other segregationist practices. In most cases, the exclusion was official town policy or was promulgated by the community's real estate agents via exclusionary covenants governing who could buy or rent property. In others, the policy was enforced through intimidation. This intimidation could occur in several ways, including harassment by law enforcement officers. Though no sundown towns exist today in the sense of publicly or legally excluding non-white residents, some commentators have applied the term to towns practicing other forms of racial exclusion.

In 1844, Oregon, which had banned slavery, banned African Americans from the territory altogether. Those who failed to leave were liable to receive lashings under a law known as the "Peter Burnett Lash Law", named for Provisional Supreme Judge Peter Burnett. No persons were ever lashed under the law; it was quickly amended to replace lashing with forced labor, and eventually repealed the following year after a change in the makeup of the legislature. However, additional laws aimed at African Americans entering Oregon were ratified in 1849 and 1857, the last of which was not repealed until 1926. Outside Oregon, other places looked to laws and legislation to restrict Black people from residing within cities, towns and states. In 1853, new black residents were banned from moving to the state of Illinois. Those new residents who remained more than ten days and were unable to pay the fine were to be punished by forced labor. Although this law faced significant resistance, especially in Illinois' small black community, it was not repealed until the end of the Civil War in 1865. Similar bans on all black migration were passed in Michigan, Ohio and Iowa. From its founding in 1871 until the early 1960s, Tempe, Arizona, allowed blacks to work in the city during the day but prohibited them from residing there or staying within city limits after dark. Norman, Oklahoma was a sundown town from 1889 until 1967. Beyond state-level legal restrictions such as anti-miscegenation laws and segregated public higher education, its sundown reputation was reinforced by extralegal means. There were violent "racial expulsions", Ku Klux Klan activity, and general denial of rights and services. Until 1967, non-whites were not permitted to be outside after dark.

New laws were enacted in the 20th century. One example is Louisville, Kentucky, whose mayor proposed a law in 1911 that would restrict Black people from owning property in certain parts of the city. This city ordinance reached public attention when it was challenged in the U.S. Supreme Court in the case of Buchanan v. Warley in 1917. Ultimately, the court decided that the laws passed in Louisville were unconstitutional, thus setting the legal precedent that similar laws could not exist or be passed in the future. However, this outcome did not stop towns from excluding black residents. Some city planners and real estate companies exercised their private authority to uphold racial segregation at the community level. In addition to discriminatory housing rules, violence and harassment were sometimes used by locals to discourage Black people from remaining in their cities after sundown. Whites in the North felt threatened by the increased minority populations moving into their neighborhoods, and racial tensions started to build. Interracial violence became more common, sometimes escalating to race riots.

After the civil rights movement of the 1950s and 1960s, and especially since the Fair Housing Act of 1968 prohibition of racial discrimination in the sale, rental and financing of housing, sundown towns gradually disappeared, with de facto sundown towns existing into the 1980s. However, as sociologist James W. Loewen wrote in his 2005 book, Sundown Towns: A Hidden Dimension of American Racism, it is impossible to count precisely the number of sundown towns at any given time because most towns have not kept records of the ordinances or signs that marked the town's sundown status. He further noted that hundreds of cities across America have been sundown towns at some point in their history. Additionally, Loewen wrote that sundown status meant more than just African Americans being unable to live in those towns. Any Black people who entered or were found in sundown towns after sunset were subject to harassment, threats and violence, including lynching.

The U.S. Supreme Court case of Brown v. Board of Education declared segregation of schools unconstitutional in 1954. Loewen speculates that the case caused some municipalities in the South to become sundown towns: Missouri, Tennessee and Kentucky saw drastic drops in African American populations living in those states following the decision. In 2019, sociologist Heather O'Connell wrote that sundown towns are "(primarily) a thing of the past". However, historian James W. Loewen notes persisting effects of sundown towns' violently enforced segregation even after they may have been integrated to a small degree, a phenomenon he called "second-generation sundown towns."

== Function ==
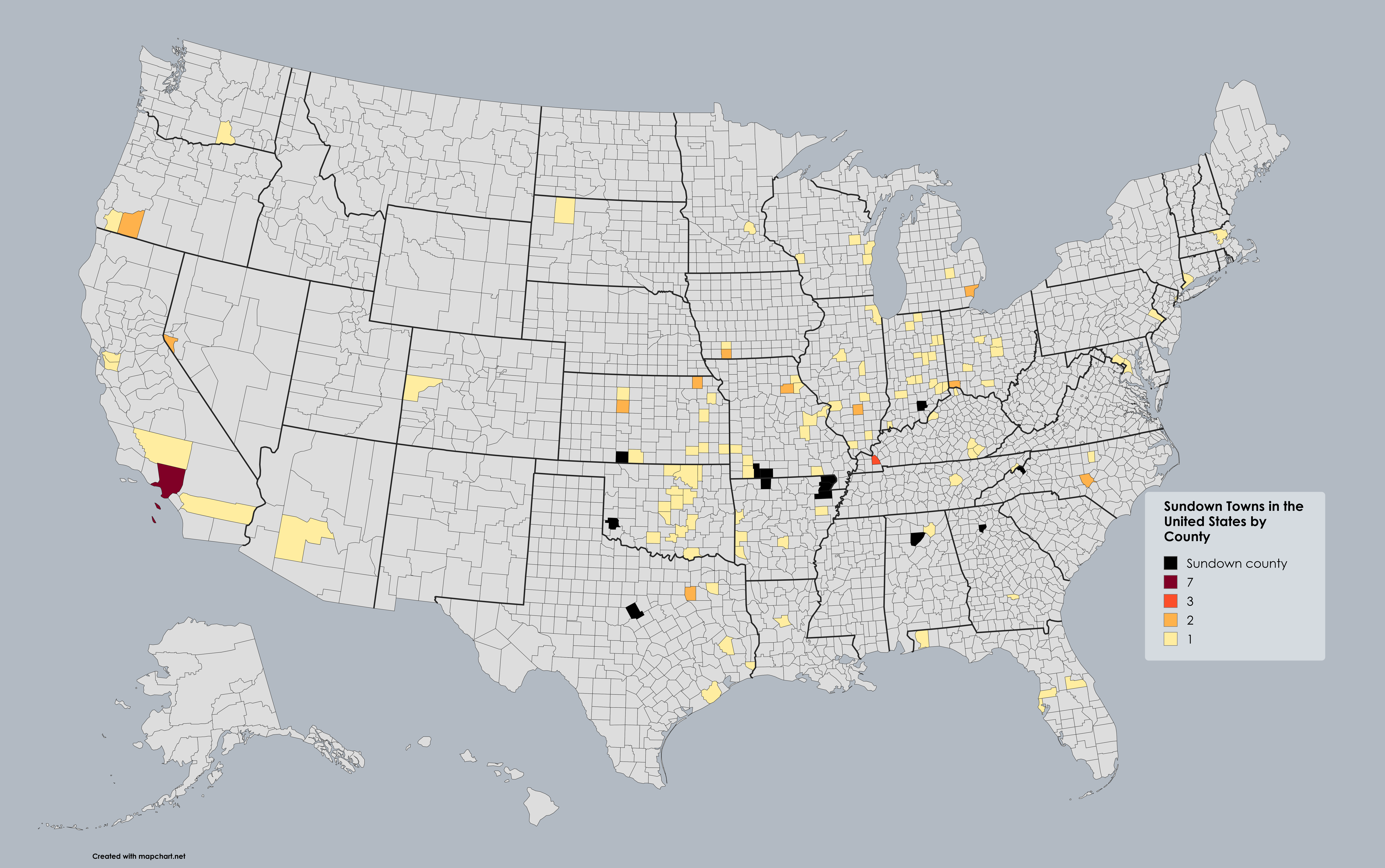
Sundown towns

=== Ethnic exclusions ===
African Americans were not the only minority group not allowed to live in white towns. One example, according to Loewen, is that, in 1870, Chinese people made up one-third of Idaho's population. Following a wave of violence and an 1886 anti-Chinese convention in Boise, almost none remained by 1910.

The towns of Minden and Gardnerville in Nevada had an ordinance from 1917 to 1974 that required Native Americans to leave the towns by 6:30 p.m. each day. A whistle, later a siren, was sounded at 6 p.m. daily, alerting Native Americans to leave by sundown. In 2021, the state of Nevada passed a law prohibiting the appropriation of Native American imagery by the mascots of schools and the sounding of sirens that were once associated with sundown ordinances. Despite this law, Minden continued to sound its siren for two more years, stating that it was a nightly tribute to first responders. An additional state law in 2023 led Minden to end the siren.

Two examples of the road signs documented during the first half of the 20th century include:

- In Colorado: "No Mexicans After Night"
- In Connecticut: "Whites Only Within City Limits After Dark"

In her 2011 article "Preemption, Patchwork Immigration Laws, and the Potential for Brown Sundown Towns" in the Fordham Law Review, Maria Marulanda outlines the possibility for non-blacks to be excluded from towns in the United States. She argues that immigration laws and ordinances in certain municipalities could create situations similar to those experienced by African Americans in sundown towns. Hispanic Americans are likely to suffer, despite the purported target being undocumented immigrants, in these cases of racial exclusion.

From 1851 to at least 1876, Antioch, California, had a sundown ordinance that barred Chinese residents from being out in public after dark. In 1876, white residents drove the Chinese out of town and then burned down the Chinatown section of the city.

Chinese Americans were also excluded from most of San Francisco, leading to the establishment of Chinatown.

=== Travel guides ===
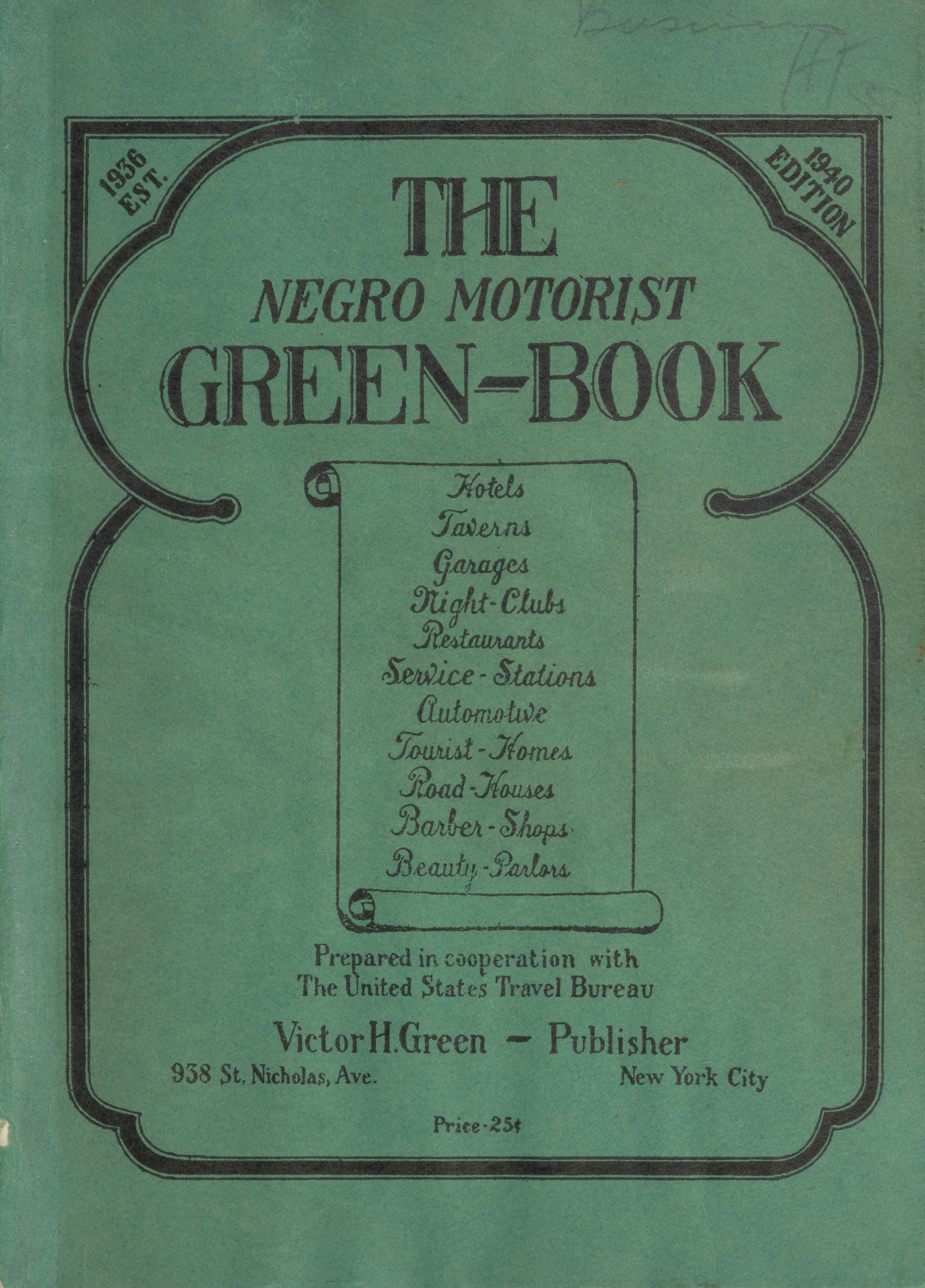
1940 edition of The Negro Motorist Green Book

Described by former NAACP President Julian Bond as "one of the survival tools of segregated life", The Negro Motorist Green Book (at times titled The Negro Traveler's Green Book or The Negro Motorist Green-Book, and commonly referred to simply as the "Green Book") was an annual segregation-era guidebook for African American motorists, published by New York travel agent and former Hackensack, New Jersey, letter carrier Victor H. Green. It was published in the United States from 1936 to 1966, during the Jim Crow era, when discrimination against non-whites was widespread.

Road trips for African Americans were inconvenient and in some cases dangerous because of racial segregation, racial profiling by police, the high rate of murder of African American travelers, and the existence of numerous sundown towns. According to author Kate Kelly, "there were at least 10,000 'sundown towns' in the United States as late as the 1960s; in a 'sundown town' nonwhites had to leave the city limits by dusk, or they could be picked up by the police or worse. These towns were not limited to the South—they ranged from Levittown, New York, to Glendale, California, and included the majority of municipalities in Illinois." The Green Book also advised drivers to wear, or have ready, a chauffeur's cap and, if stopped, relate that "they were delivering a car for a white person."

On June 7, 2017, the NAACP issued a warning to prospective African American travelers to Missouri. This is the first NAACP warning ever covering an entire state. The NAACP conference president suggested that, if prospective African American travelers must go to Missouri, they travel with bail money in hand.

=== Sundown suburbs ===
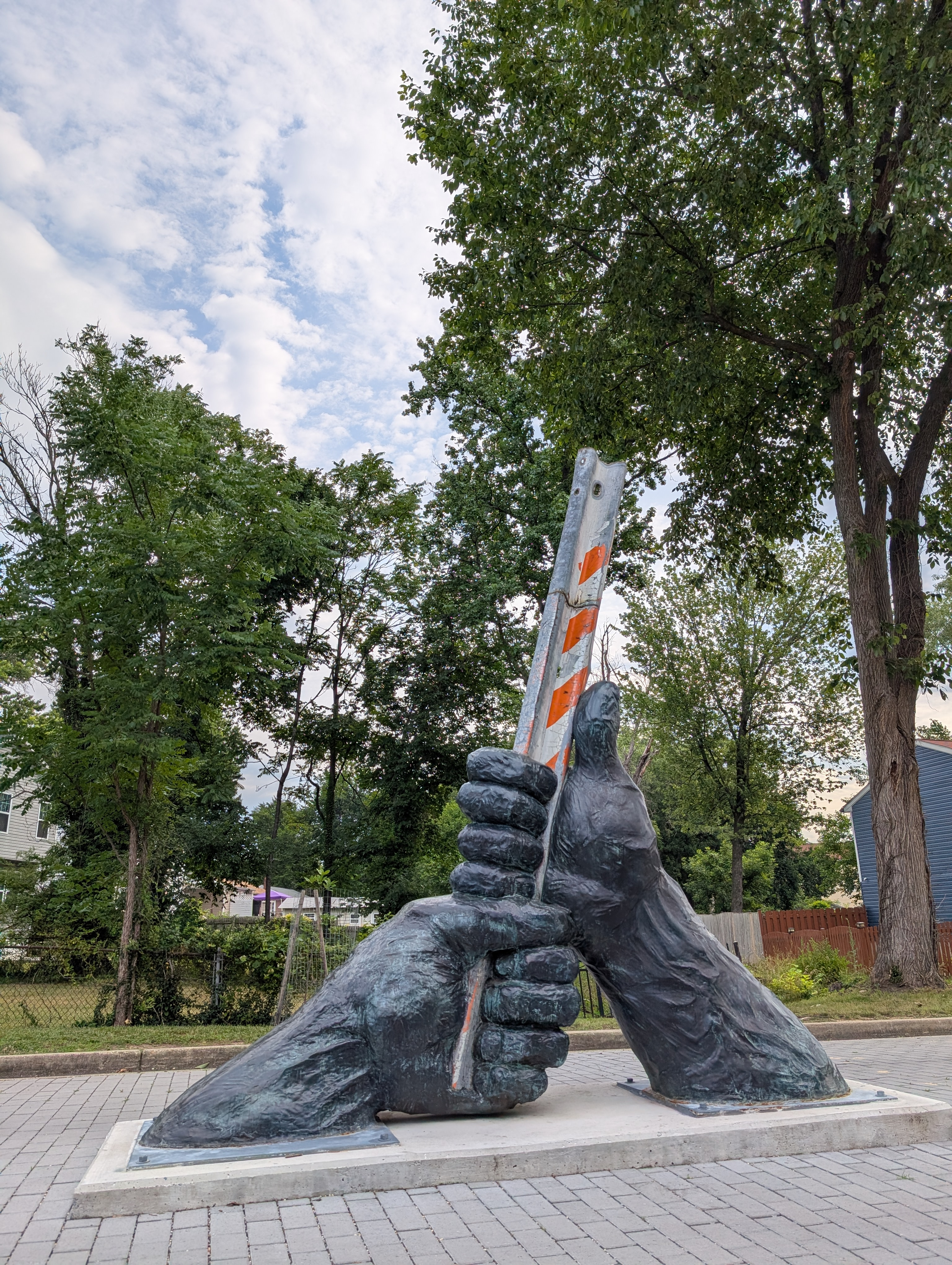
A sculpture on Windom Road, between North Brentwood, Maryland, a historically black community, and Brentwood, Maryland, a sundown town, depicts two hands removing the original barrier between the municipalities.

Many suburban areas in the United States were incorporated following the establishment of Jim Crow laws. The majority of suburbs were made up of all white residents from the time they were first created. Most sundown suburbs were created between 1906 and 1968. By 1970, at the peak of the Civil Rights era, some sundown suburbs had already begun to desegregate. Harassment and inducements contributed to keeping African Americans out of new suburban areas.

== Sundown towns in popular culture ==
- Gentleman's Agreement (1947), is known as "the only feature film [of its era] to treat sundown towns seriously." It features a town that excludes Jewish people rather than Black people. According to James W. Loewen, "The anti-Nazi ideology opened more sundown suburbs to Jews than to African Americans... Gentleman's Agreement, Elia Kazan's 1948 Academy Award-winning movie [exposed] Darien, Connecticut, as an anti-Jewish sundown town."
- The Fugitive Kind (1960), a film directed by Sidney Lumet and starring Marlon Brando and Anna Magnani, mentions sundown towns. A Southern sheriff tells Brando's character about a sign in the small town that reads, "Nigger, don't let the sun go down on you in this county." The same sign is shown in Tennessee Williams's play Orpheus Descending, upon which the film is based.
- In her memoir I Know Why the Caged Bird Sings (1969), poet Maya Angelou describes Mississippi as inhospitable to African Americans after dark: "Don't let the sun set on you here nigger, Mississippi."
- Oprah Winfrey visited Forsyth County, Georgia, during a 1987 episode of her television show following the 1987 Forsyth County protests. The protests stemmed from continued racial conflict and reputation as a sundown-town area into the 1960s, following the expulsion of African Americans in the 1920s.
- Trouble Behind (1991), a documentary by Robby Henson, examines the history and legacy of racism in Corbin, Kentucky, a small railroad community noteworthy both as the home of Colonel Sanders' Kentucky Fried Chicken and for "its race riots of 1919, during which over two hundred blacks were loaded onto boxcars and shipped out of town." The film aired at the 1991 Sundance Film Festival and was nominated for the Grand Jury Prize.
- No Niggers, No Jews, No Dogs (2000), a play by John Henry Redwood.
- Banished: How Whites Drove Blacks Out of Town in America (2006), a documentary by Marco Williams that was inspired by Elliot Jaspin's book Buried in the Bitter Waters: The Hidden History of Racial Cleansing in America (2007).
- Sundown Town (2011), a play by Kevin D. Cohea.
- The Injustice Files: Sundown Towns (February 24, 2014), an Investigation Discovery documentary by filmmaker Keith Beauchamp, executive produced by Al Roker.
- Green Book (2018), the Academy Award winner for Best Picture, is a comedy drama about a tour of the Deep South in the 1960s by African American classical and jazz pianist Don Shirley (Mahershala Ali), who is arrested in a Southern town for being out after sundown.
- In the first episode of the 2020 television series Lovecraft Country (2020) (TV series based on the 2016 book written by Matt Ruff). The protagonists embarking on a road trip across 1950s Jim Crow America are pulled over by a police officer who informs them they are in a "sundown county" and threatens that they could be lynched if they do not leave the county before sundown.

== See also ==
- List of expulsions of African Americans, including some towns that became sundown towns after they expelled their black populations
- Black Codes (United States)
- Racial covenants
- Racial segregation in the United States
- Racism against African Americans
- Racism in the United States
- Redlining
- Perth Prohibited Area, the Australian equivalent
