= It-goom-mum teh-weh-weh ush-shah-ish =

- U.S. National Register of Historic Places
- Location: Address restricted, vicinity of Dresslerville, Nevada
- NRHP reference No.: 15001029
- Added to NRHP: February 1, 2016

It-goom-mum teh-weh-weh ush-shah-ish was listed on the National Register of Historic Places in 2016.

It is also known as Dance Hill and is sacred to the Washoe people.

It is located in the vicinity of the Dresslerville Washoe community.
