= Carson Valley Improvement Club Hall =

- U.S. National Register of Historic Places
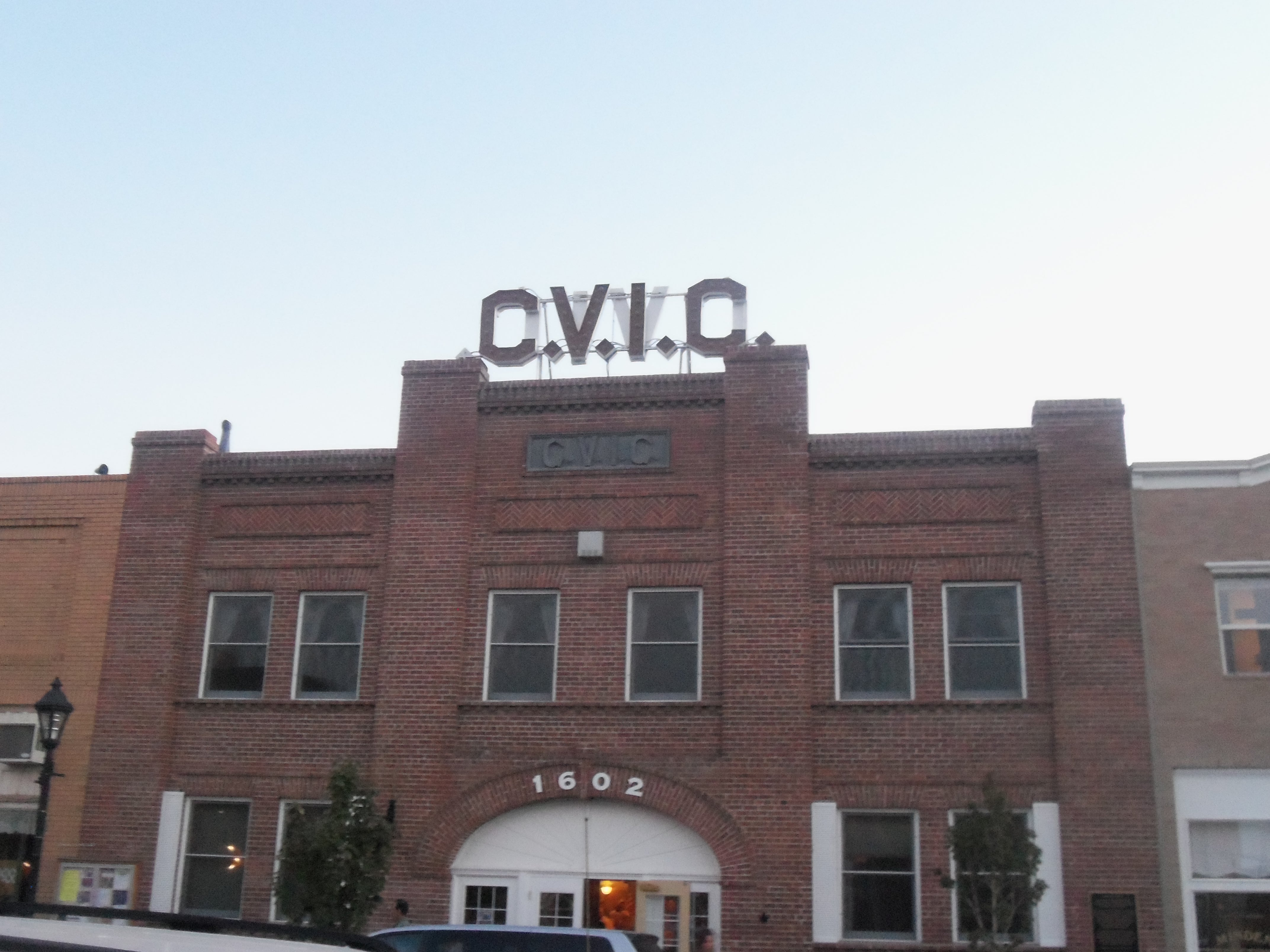

- Location within Nevada Location within the United States
- Location: 1606 Esmeralda Ave., Minden, Nevada
- Coordinates: 38°57′12″N 119°45′49″W
- Area: 0.2 acres (0.081 ha)
- Built: 1912
- NRHP reference No.: 83004184
- Added to NRHP: August 4, 1983

The Carson Valley Improvement Club Hall is a historic building located at 1606 Esmeralda Avenue in Minden, Nevada. The building was constructed in 1912 as a meeting hall for the Carson Valley Improvement Club. The two-story building features a variety of brickwork patterns but has an otherwise plain design. The Carson Valley Improvement Club used the building to host both community social events and town meetings. The building has served as the informal seat of government in Minden since its construction; after the Carson Valley Improvement Club moved out in 1920, the Minden Commercial Club and later the Minden Town Board continued to hold government meetings at the building. Though Minden is unincorporated, the groups meeting in this building have acted as local liaisons to Douglas County's government and have helped manage local government services. In addition, the building has continued to house a variety of social events, including concerts, movies, religious services, and basketball games.

The building was added to the National Register of Historic Places on August 4, 1983.
