= Vocational-Agriculture Building (Lovelock, Nevada) =

- U.S. National Register of Historic Places
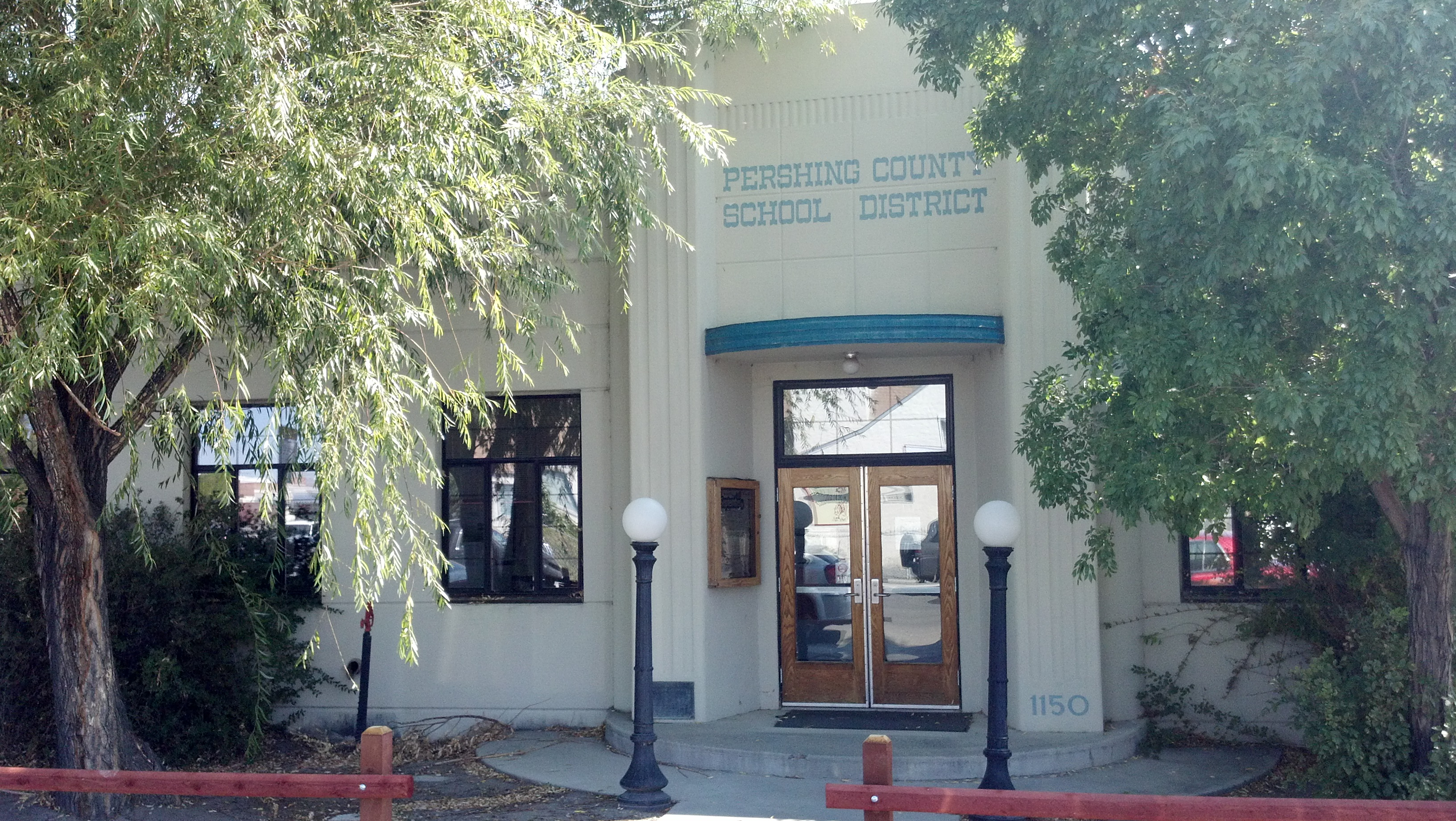

- Location within Nevada Location within the United States
- Location: 1150 Elmhurst Ave., Lovelock, Nevada
- Coordinates: 40.18203°N 118.47718°W
- Area: less than one acre
- Built: 1941
- Built by: National Youth Administration
- Architect: Mills, Russell
- Architectural style: Moderne
- NRHP reference No.: 91001528
- Added to NRHP: October 24, 1991

The Vocational-Agriculture Building in Lovelock, Nevada, located at 1150 Elmhurst Ave. is a historic Moderne-style building that was built in 1941. It is listed on the National Register of Historic Places.

It was a work of the National Youth Administration and it was a work of Reno architect Russell Mills.

It was listed on the National Register of Historic Places in 1991.

The building is now used for the Pershing County School District offices.
