= Morrill Hall (University of Nevada, Reno) =

- U.S. National Register of Historic Places
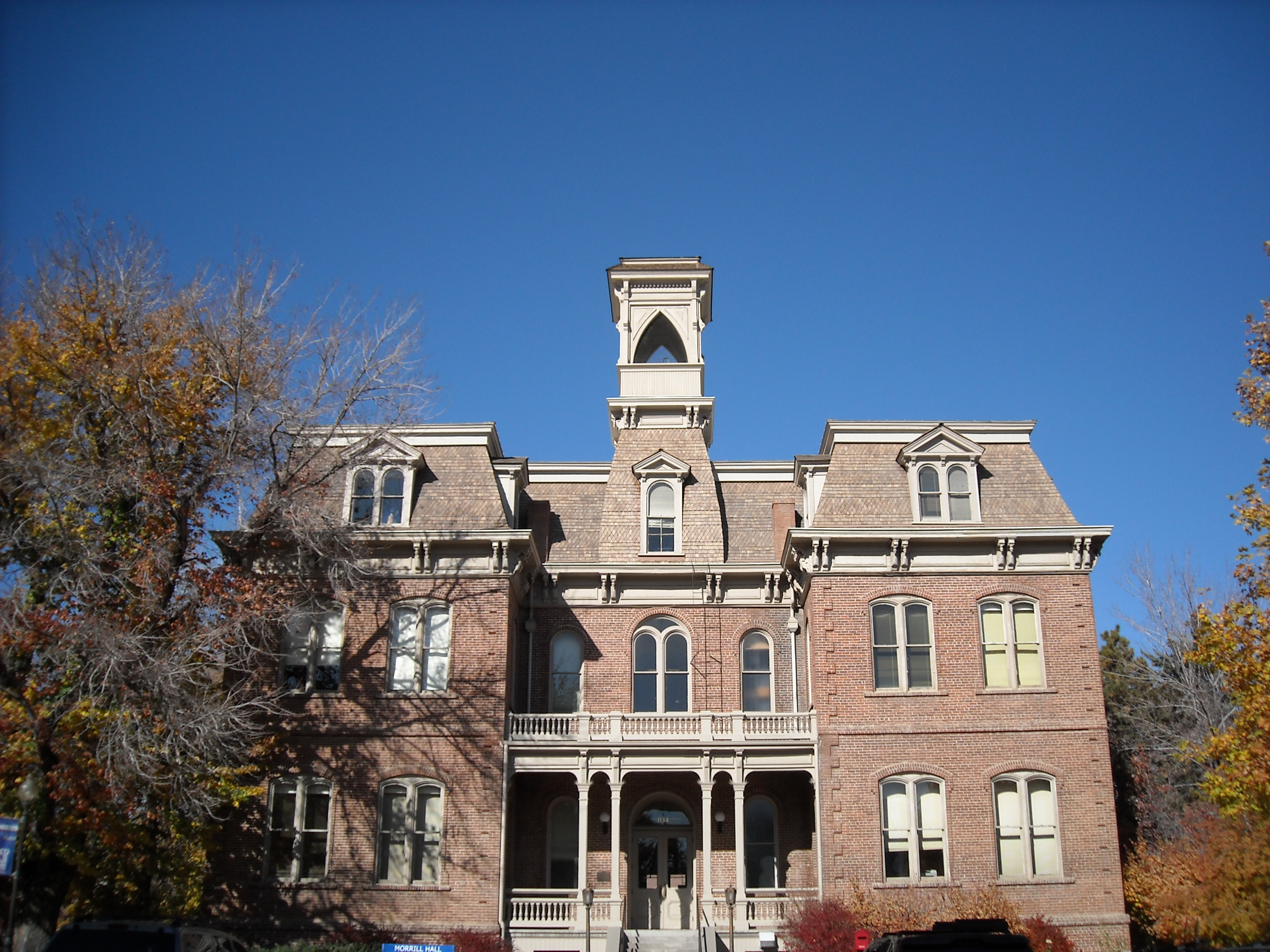

- Location within Nevada Location within the United States
- Location: Reno, Nevada, U.S.
- Coordinates: 39°32′15″N 119°48′46″W
- Area: 0.2 acres (0.081 ha)
- Built: 1885–86
- Architectural style: Italianate
- NRHP reference No.: 74001152
- Added to NRHP: May 1, 1974; 52 years ago

Morrill Hall at the University of Nevada, Reno is a historic Italianate building that was built during 1885–86. It was described by architect Edward Parsons as "'a classic example of Italianate Victorian architecture...dignified with a wood shingled mansard roof and full dormer windows.'"

The hall was the first building constructed on the campus and originally housed the entire university, including offices, classrooms, library and living quarters for the grounds keeper. It is named after U.S. Congressman and later Senator Justin Smith Morrill of Vermont, who was the author of the 1862 Morrill Land-Grant Colleges Act that led to the development of the University of Nevada, Reno.

Morrill Hall was listed on the National Register of Historic Places on May 1, 1974.
