= Edward Parsons (architect) =

American architect

Edward Parsons (1907–1991) was an American architect who practiced in Nevada and was a leader in historic preservation. He was born in Tonopah, Nevada in 1907, went to school in Salt Lake City, Utah and in Reno, Nevada, and studied architecture at University of Southern California and the University of Pennsylvania.

One of his works, the J. Clarence Kind House, at 751 Marsh Ave., in Reno, Nevada, is listed on the U.S. National Register of Historic Places. He assisted in the restoration of numerous buildings, was state preservation coordinator in Nevada for the American Institute of Architects, and was active in state and local historic review bodies.

Architectural works include:

- Incline High School
- University of Nevada, Reno, buildings:
  - Fleischmann Agriculture and Home Economics building
  - Orvis School of Nursing
  - Medical School complex
- J. Clarence Kind House

Specific restoration projects to which he contributed include:

- Nevada State Capitol Building
- Morrill Hall, University of Nevada, Reno
- Bowers Mansion
- Lake Mansion
- Berlin Mill
- Virginia City Courthouse
- Belmont Courthouse
- Genoa Courthouse
- Fort Churchill

He was interviewed within the University of Nevada's Oral Historic Project during 1981, and donated numerous of his design drawings in 1982.
