= Wilhelm and William Lampe Ranch =

- U.S. National Register of Historic Places
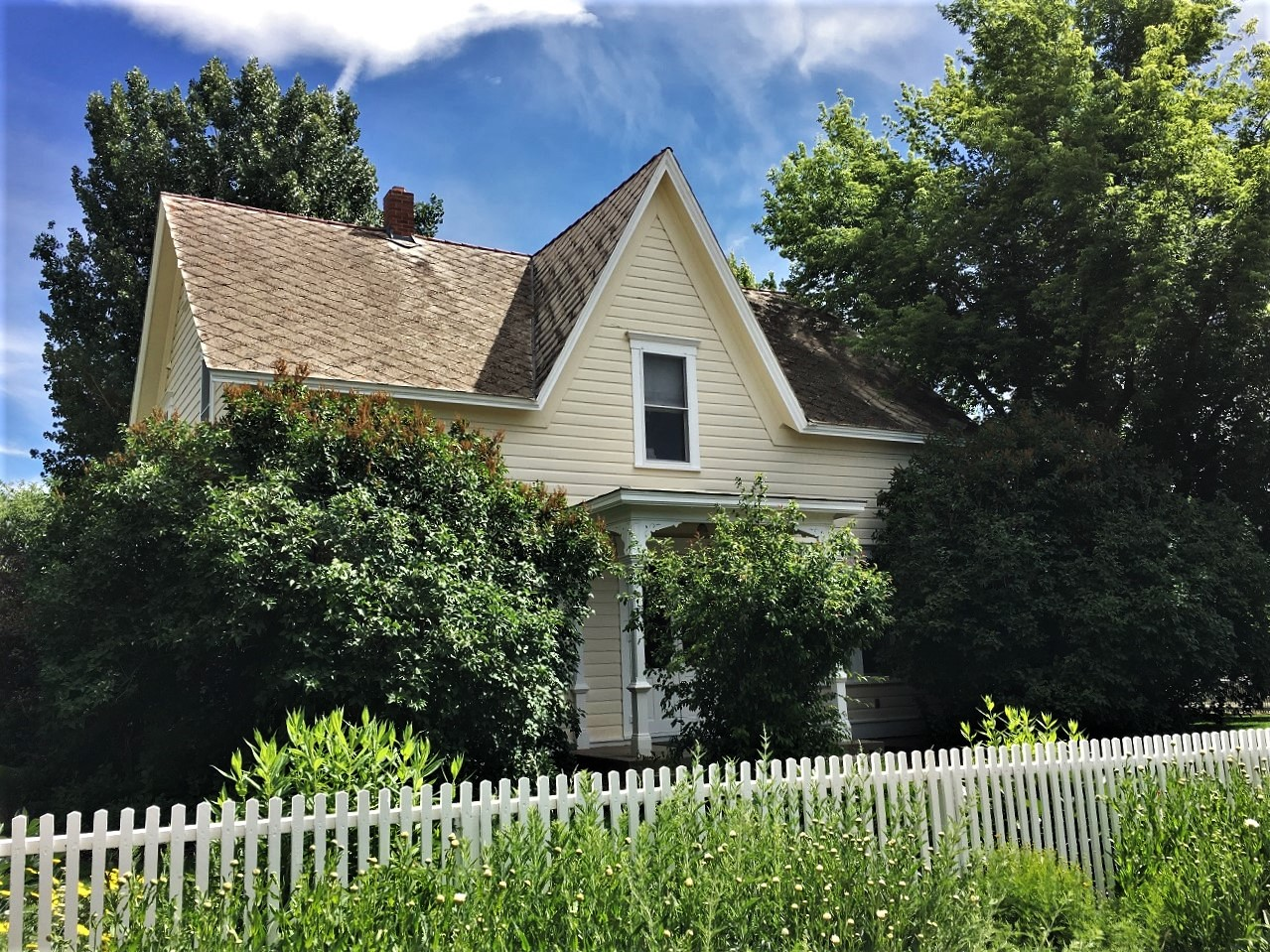

- Location within Nevada Location within the United States
- Location: 1335 Centerville Ln. Gardnerville, Nevada
- Coordinates: 38°56′03″N 119°44′56″W
- Area: 5 acres (2.0 ha)
- MPS: Agriculture on the Carson River in Nevada's Douglas and Ormsby Counties MPS
- NRHP reference No.: 100001620
- Added to NRHP: April 12, 2018

The Wilhelm and William Lampe Ranch in Gardnerville, Nevada was listed on the National Register of Historic Places in 2018.

It has also been known as Jacobs Family Berry Farm.

It was a 245 acres (0.99 km^{2}) ranch in 1928.

The Lampe Ranch House, on the ranch, is a "subdued example" of Gothic Revival architecture.

Wilhelm Lampe was born in 1858 in Hanover, Germany.
