= Lena N. Gale Cabin =

Historic house in Nevada, United States

- Gale, Lena N., Cabin
- U.S. National Register of Historic Places
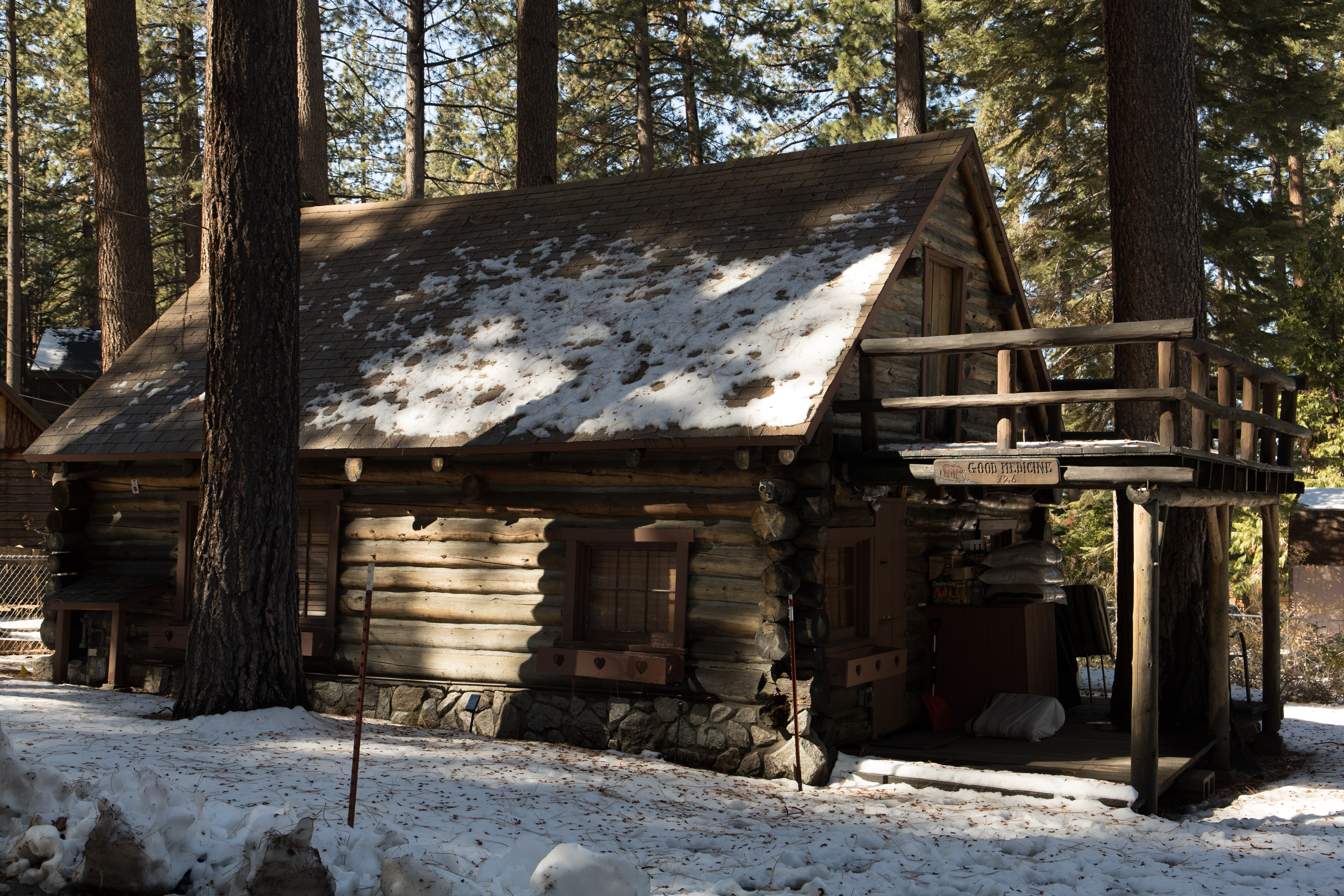

- Location within Nevada Location within the United States
- Location: 726 Cedar St., Zephyr Cove, Nevada
- Coordinates: 39°0′12″N 119°56′56″W
- Area: 0.7 acres (0.28 ha)
- Built: 1940
- Architectural style: Rustic
- NRHP reference No.: 01000586
- Added to NRHP: June 12, 2001

The Lena N. Gale Cabin, in a development near Lake Tahoe at 726 Cedar St. in Zephyr Cove, Nevada, is a historic building built in 1940. Also known as Good Medicine Cabin, it is an example of Rustic architecture. It was listed on the National Register of Historic Places in 2001.

It was deemed significant for its architecture. Its NRHP nomination argues that it "typifies the development of middle class summer recreation opportunities at Lake Tahoe during the mid-20th century" and that it is "an excellent local example of the Rustic Style of architecture favored for mountain recreational dwellings during the first half of the 20th century."
