= Lake Shore House =

- U.S. National Register of Historic Places
- Location within Nevada Location within the United States
- Location: Glenbrook Rd, Glenbrook, Nevada
- Coordinates: 39°5′18″N 119°56′18″W
- Area: 1 acre (0.40 ha)
- Built: 1863
- Built by: Pray, Augustus W.
- NRHP reference No.: 79001463
- Added to NRHP: October 4, 1979

The Lake Shore House in Glenbrook, Nevada is a historic hotel by Lake Tahoe that was built in 1863 and moved in 1906. It was listed on the National Register of Historic Places in 1979.
