= Carson Valley Hospital =

- U.S. National Register of Historic Places
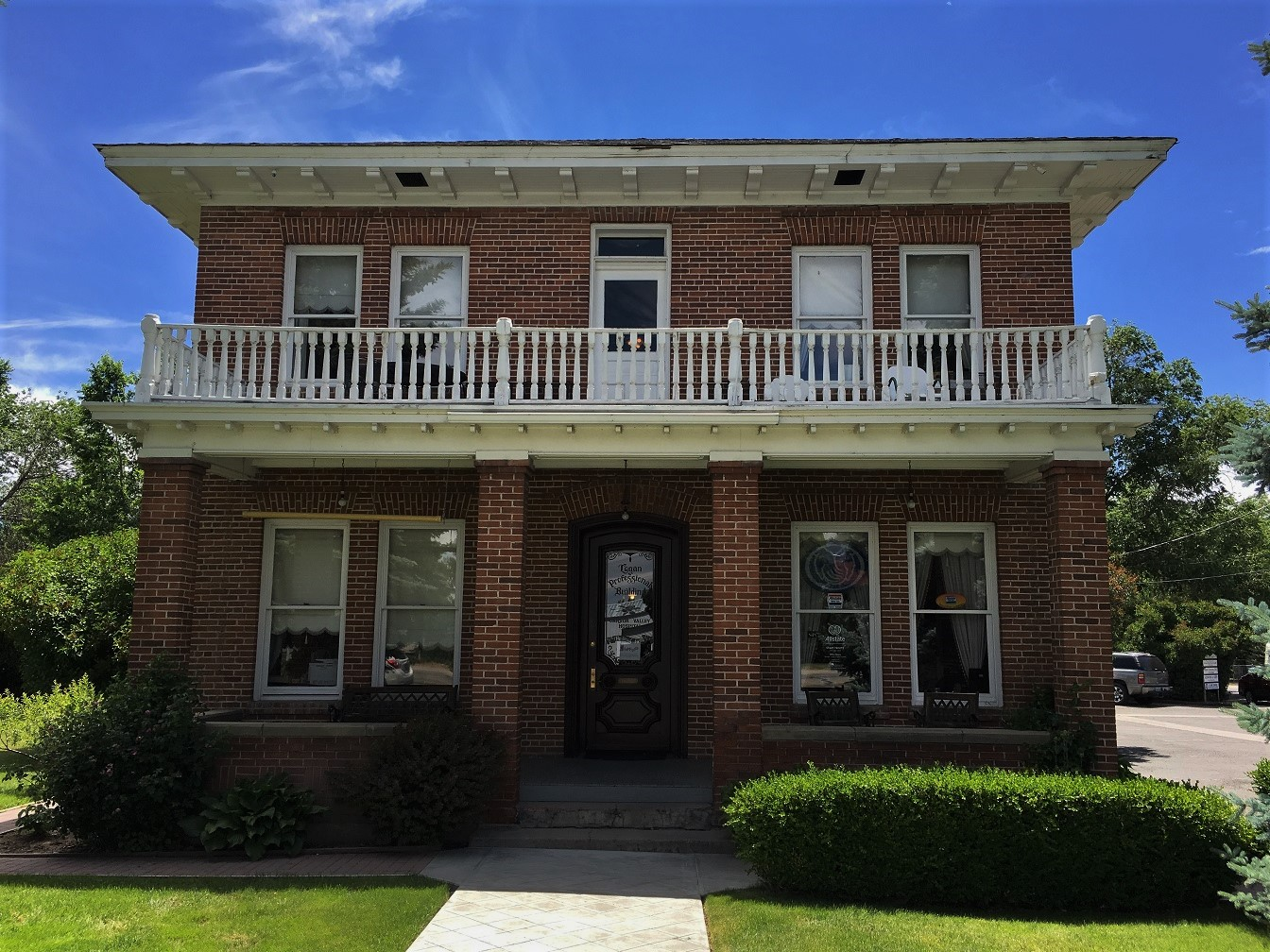

- Location within Nevada Location within the United States
- Location: 1466 U.S. 395, Gardnerville, Nevada
- Coordinates: 38°56′34″N 119°45′2″W
- Area: less than one acre
- Built: 1914
- NRHP reference No.: 79001462
- Added to NRHP: May 29, 1979

The Carson Valley Hospital is a historic hospital located at 1466 U.S. Route 395 in Gardnerville, Nevada. The hospital was built in 1914 by Dr. E. H. Hawkins, the county physician and health officer of Douglas County. The hospital was regarded as one of Nevada's best, and it included modern tools such as an X-ray machine, a rarity in small town hospitals at the time. While Hawkins anticipated that Douglas County would need a modern hospital for its growing population, the county's population actually fell at the 1920 census, and the community struggled to keep its hospital open. Hawkins sold the hospital in 1918, and it closed in 1924. The building was used for housing until 1958, when it was vacated.

The building was added to the National Register of Historic Places on May 29, 1979.
