= Farmer's Bank of Carson Valley (1597 Esmeralda Avenue, Minden, Nevada) =

- Farmers Bank of Carson Valley
- U.S. National Register of Historic Places
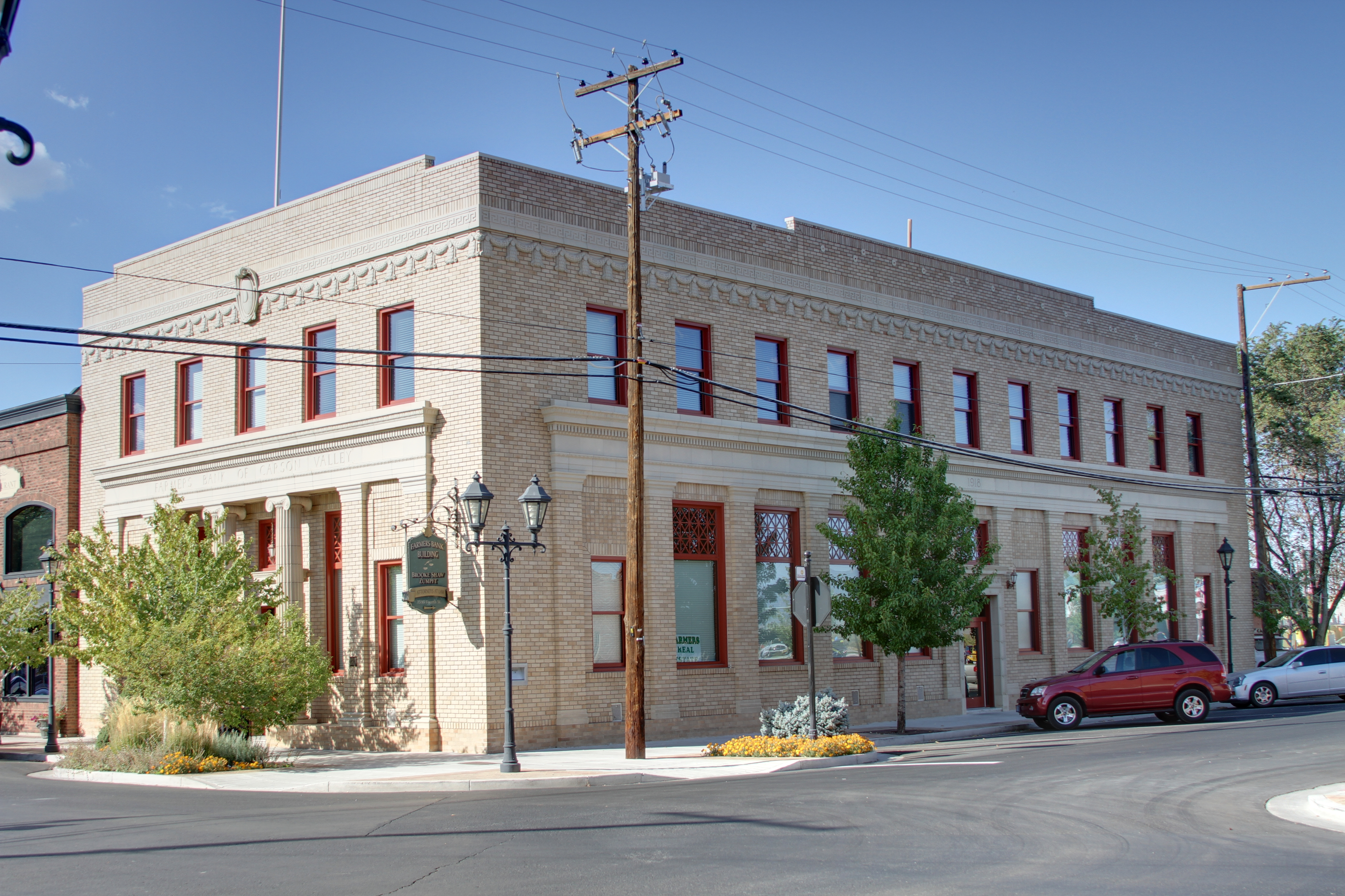

- Location within Nevada Location within the United States
- Location: 1597 Esmeralda Ave., Minden, Nevada
- Coordinates: 38°57′13″N 119°45′45″W
- Area: less than one acre
- Built: 1916–18
- Architect: DeLongchamps, Frederic J.
- Architectural style: Classical Revival
- MPS: Architecture of Frederick J. DeLongchamps TR
- NRHP reference No.: 86002264
- Added to NRHP: August 6, 1986

Farmer's Bank of Carson Valley (also spelled Farmers Bank of Carson Valley) is a historic bank building at 1597 Esmeralda Avenue in Minden, Nevada. It was built from 1916 to 1918 to replace the original 1909 bank building, which the Farmer's Bank had outgrown. Prominent Nevada architect Frederic Joseph DeLongchamps designed the building in the Classical Revival style; the bank is one of many Neoclassical structures in Minden designed by DeLongchamps. It features a cornice with terra cotta tiles and bands, a flat roof with a low parapet, and an entrance portico with Ionic columns. It was built for Farmer's Bank organizer H. F. Dangberg, who was also the founder of Minden. It served as a bank until 1968; it currently houses offices.

It was added to the National Register of Historic Places on August 6, 1986.
