= No Niggers, No Jews, No Dogs =

American play by John Henry Redwood

No Niggers, No Jews, No Dogs (2000) is an American play by John Henry Redwood. Set in Halifax, North Carolina in around 1949, the play dramatizes the unfortunate times of an African-American family, the Cheeks, and their encounter with a Jewish writer, Yaveni Aaronsohn. The title refers to a placard said to have been put by the road at the entrance to a town in Mississippi.

== Plot ==
In 1949, Jewish writer Yaveni Aaronsohn is in Halifax, North Carolina. He is researching a book on the similarities and differences between the prejudice and victimization experienced by blacks and Jews. He talks to the Cheek family about their experiences in Halifax. The Cheeks are a loving family, comprising Rawl, his church-going wife Mattie, and their children Joyce and Matoka. They are initially unsympathetic to the project, being skeptical of Yaveni's claim that he is not "white" because he is Jewish. But since he is paying them for their time, they accept him with some suspicion.

The relationship between the writer and family became more intimate and trusting as they began to understand his point of view, aided by their enigmatic friend "Aunt Cora", a woman who always wears black. Things take a dramatic turn when Rawl has to leave Halifax to find work in Alabama. While he is away, Mattie is raped and made pregnant by a white man. Knowing that Rawl will realise the child is not his, she falsely confesses to an affair while he was away. She does this to avoid the prospect of Rawl attacking the rapist, which could lead to Rawl being lynched. Rawl, shocked, leaves his family, and Mattie has to try to find a way to bring them back together without bringing the wrath of local racists upon them.

== Characters ==
- Yaveni Aaronsohn
- Mattie Cheeks
- Rawl Cheeks
- Joyce Cheeks
- Matoka Cheeks
- Aunt Cora

== Critical reception ==
In critiquing the play, Dan Bacalzo of Theater Mania wrote, "No Niggers, No Jews, No Dogs is a well-intentioned effort that falls short of its goal. Although it does address racism and anti-Semitism within a story that is often emotionally wrenching, the ending is a little too pat and the play ultimately comes along as simplistic". However, Kristi Shelloner of Alexandria News wrote, "It is powerful, evocative and painful; it is also heartwarming, funny and transcendent. There are no false notes here."

A number of reviewers found the character of the Jewish sociologist Yaveni to be unconvincing. Matthew Murra found several of his "preachy" utterances to be unintentionally funny. John Barry considered both Yaveni and Cora to be cardboard characters who were there mainly to make speeches, "While Aaronsohn introduces us to the Holocaust and Aunt Cora makes us aware of the horrors of lynching, Redwood hasn't found a way to integrate either one of them into the action."

== Productions ==
Redwood developed the play at the Cleveland Playhouse in 2000, leading to an off-broadway production in 2001 at Primary Stages in New York City. The play had a "world premiere" (26 January-25 February 2001) by the Philadelphia Theatre Company at the Plays and Players Theatre. It has since been showcased at many events publicizing African-American history.
