= Jobs Peak Ranch =

- U.S. National Register of Historic Places
- Location within Nevada Location within the United States
- Nearest city: Genoa, Nevada
- Coordinates: 38°53′49″N 119°50′56″W
- Area: 4.1 acres (1.7 ha)
- Built: 1936
- Built by: Dressler, Herb
- Architect: Mills, Russell
- Architectural style: Swiss Chalet
- NRHP reference No.: 00001639
- Added to NRHP: January 11, 2001

The Jobs Peak Ranch, near Genoa, Nevada, includes a historic Swiss Chalet style main house built in 1936. It was designed by young architect Russell Mills, perhaps as his first individual major commission, and is listed on the National Register of Historic Places. It was listed on the National Register of Historic Places in 2001; the listing included three contributing buildings and two contributing structures.

It was deemed significant for NRHP listing "as a rare, Nevada variant of Swiss Chalet architecture". The NRHP nomination asserts the buildings and structures of the ranch "epitomize the coalescence of Swiss Chalet architectural styling and the Arts and Crafts Movement, most likely inspired by the work of northern California's First Bay Tradition architects."
