= William F. Dressler =

American politician

William F. Dressler was an American rancher, businessman, and state senator in Nevada. Dresslerville, Nevada, is named for him. He gave a 40-acre (16 ha) tract of land to the Washoe tribe in that area via the federal government in 1917.

Dressler was the son of Carson Valley settler A. F. Dressler. He married Maggie A. Park in 1897, and they had a house in Gardnerville.

The University of Nebraska Libraries have a collection of Dressler family photos including the Carson Valley home where William Dressler was born, the home where he lived with his wife, and family members The University of Nevada in Reno also has a collection of family photos.

== Legacy ==
His son Fred gave an oral interview as part of the University of Nevada Oral History Project and discussed his father. The Nevada senate passed a concurrent resolution memorializing Frederick Hugh Dressler (born August 3, 1898) at its 69th session citing his family history and father.
