= Minden Flour Milling Company =

- U.S. National Register of Historic Places
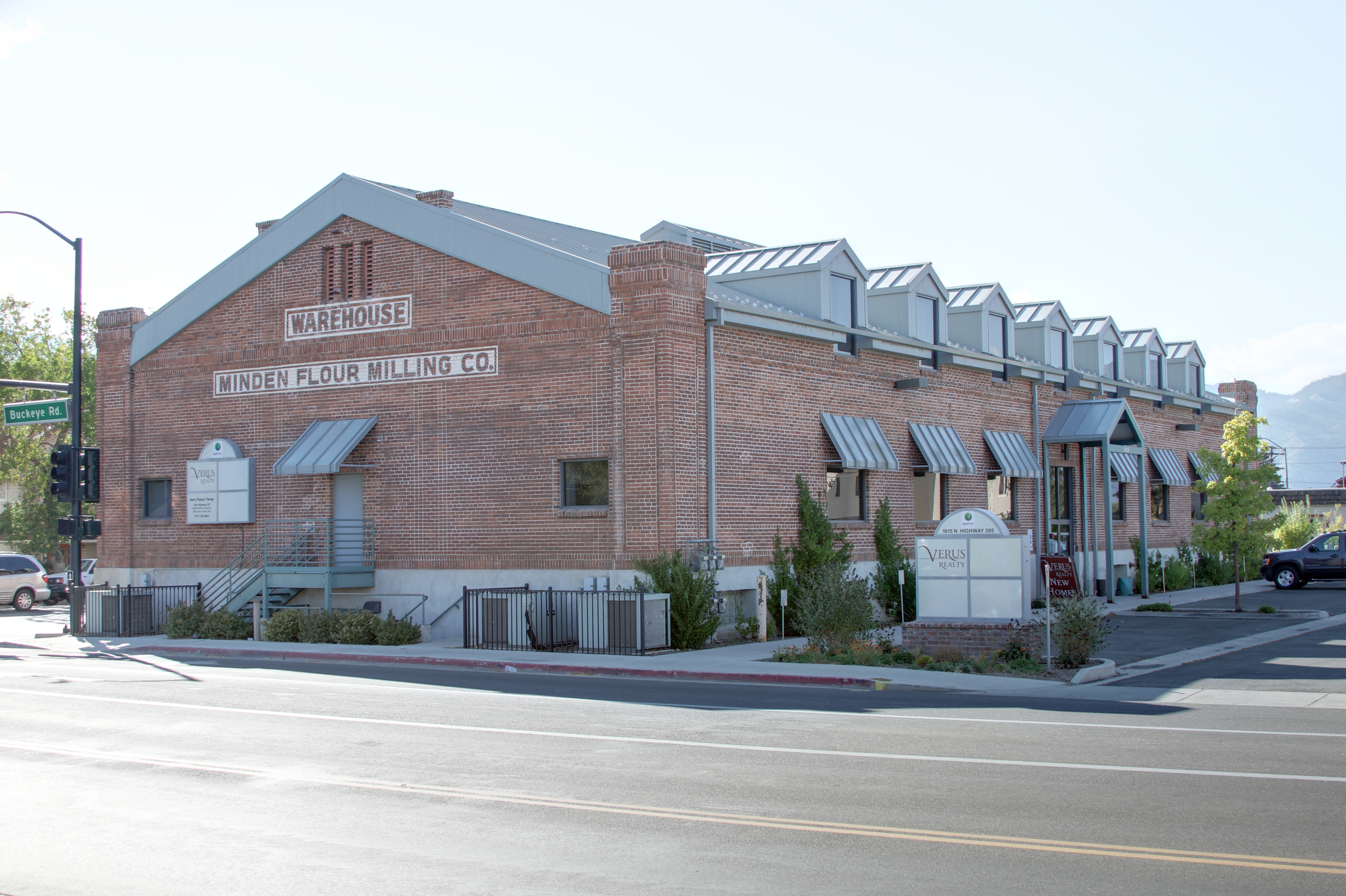

- Location within Nevada Location within the United States
- Location: 6th St. and U.S. 395, Minden, Nevada
- Coordinates: 38°57′18″N 119°45′46″W
- Area: 0.8 acres (0.32 ha)
- Built: 1906
- Built by: Wezer, F.G.; Morgan, Allis Chalmers
- NRHP reference No.: 78001721
- Added to NRHP: November 14, 1978

The Minden Flour Milling Company is a historic flour mill located at 1609 U.S. Highway 395 in Minden, Nevada. Built in 1906, the mill was the largest of five flour mills built in the Carson Valley and is the only one still in existence. The building has a transitional design in two respects, as it reflects the change from early European-influenced mills to 20th-century American mills as well as the move from smaller rural mills to large mills built along railroads. The mill features a masonry bearing-wall style of construction, a concrete foundation considered novel at the time, and well-crafted masonry and woodwork. The operators of the mill had a significant influence on Minden commerce, as they were instrumental in both the extension of the Virginia and Truckee Railroad to the town and the expansion of electric power to the area. By the 1920s, the mill had become "one of the biggest milling concerns in the state"; it could process 100 barrels of flour a day and also produced chicken and cattle feed. The mill operated until the 1960s.

The mill was added to the National Register of Historic Places on November 14, 1978.
