= Gardnerville Elementary School =

- U.S. National Register of Historic Places
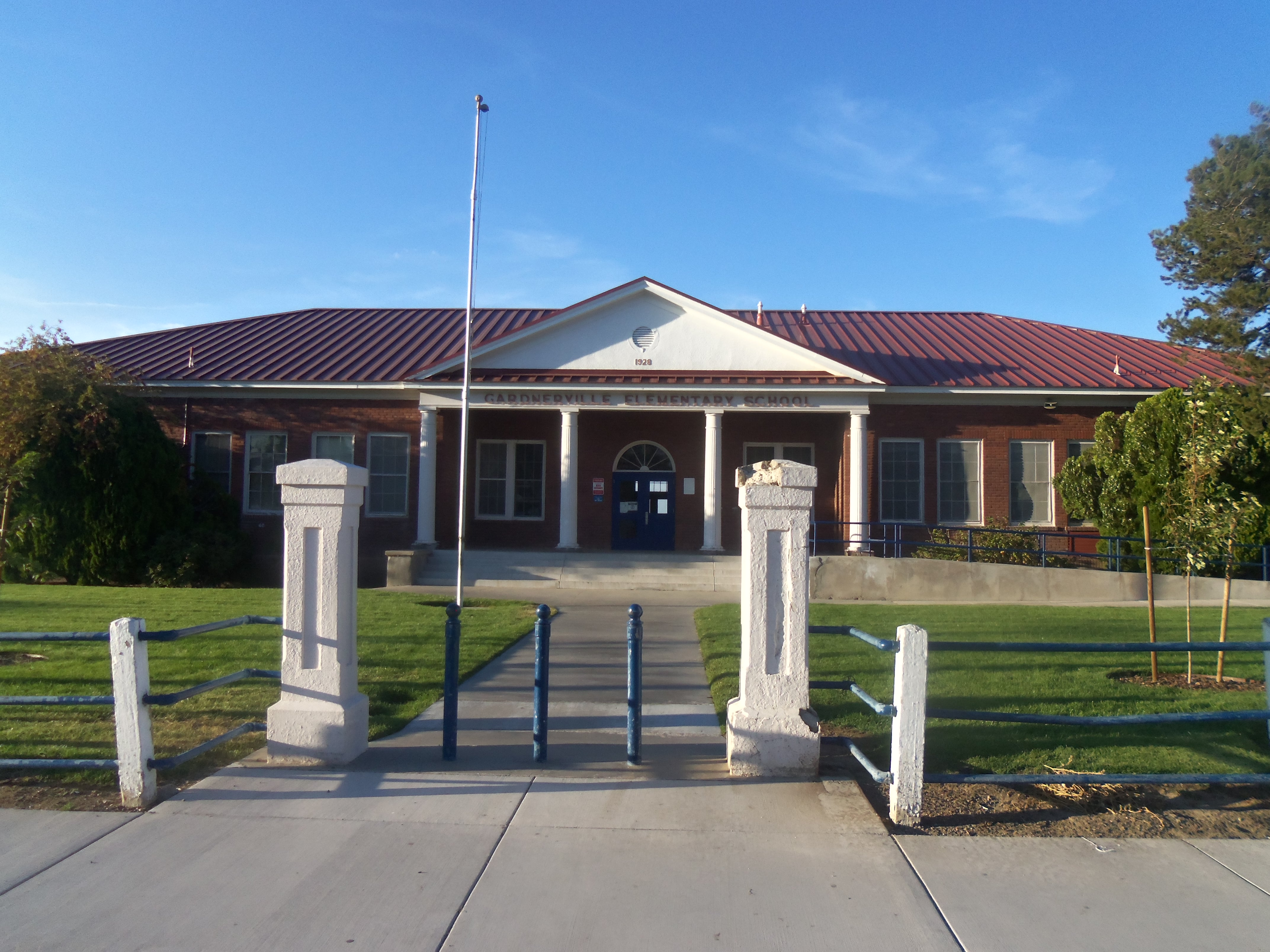

- Location within Nevada Location within the United States
- Location: 1290 Toler Ave., Gardnerville, Nevada
- Coordinates: 38.9398°N 119.7440°W
- Area: 12.1 acres (4.9 ha)
- Built: 1928
- Built by: C.C. Meneley
- Architectural style: Classical Revival
- MPS: School Buildings in Nevada MPS
- NRHP reference No.: 08000033
- Added to NRHP: February 19, 2008

The Gardnerville Elementary School, at 1290 Toler Ave. in Gardnerville, Nevada, is a historic Classical Revival-style school that is listed on the U.S. National Register of Historic Places.

It was built in 1928, and, as of 2008, was still used as a school, though other buildings on the property besides the NRHP-listed one exist. It was listed on the National Register in 2008, along with Minden Elementary School.
