= Farmer's Bank of Carson Valley (1596 Esmeralda Avenue, Minden, Nevada) =

- Farmers' Bank of Carson Valley
- U.S. National Register of Historic Places
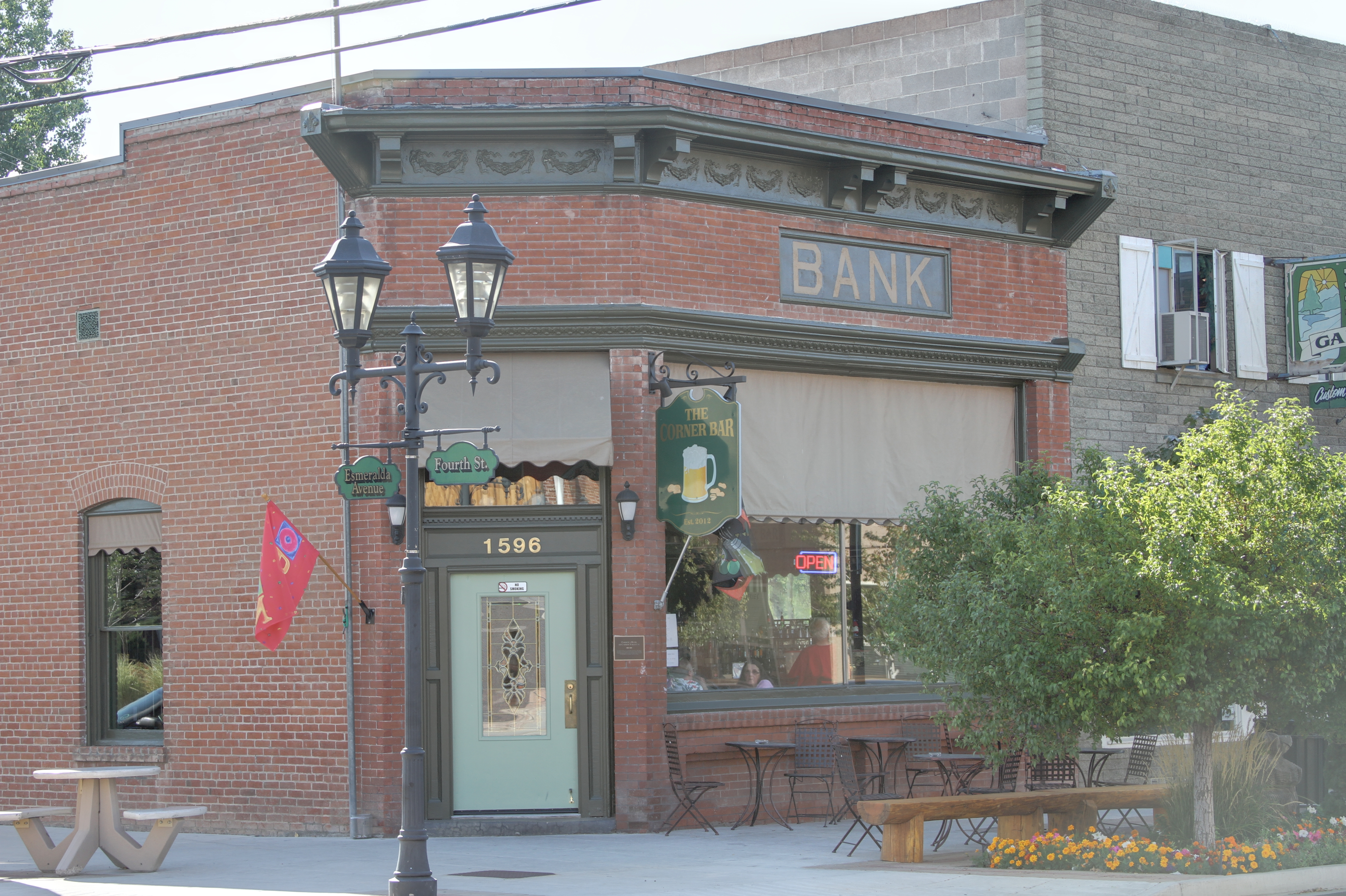

- Location within Nevada Location within the United States
- Location: 1596 Esmeralda Ave., Minden, Nevada
- Coordinates: 38°57′10″N 119°45′47″W
- Area: 0.1 acres (0.040 ha)
- Built: 1909
- Architectural style: Italianate
- NRHP reference No.: 00000338
- Added to NRHP: April 6, 2000

Farmer's Bank of Carson Valley (also spelled Farmers' Bank of Carson Valley) is a historic bank building located at 1596 Esmeralda Avenue in Minden, Nevada. The building was built in 1909 to house the Farmer's Bank of Carson Valley, which was chartered in the same year. H. F. Dangberg, the founder of Minden, commissioned the building, which was only the second building built in the town. In 1918, the bank outgrew its original building and moved to a larger building across the street. After the bank left the building, it was occupied by the Minden Post Office until 1974. The building has housed a variety of businesses since and is currently occupied by the Bank Parlor and Pub.

The building was added to the National Register of Historic Places on April 6, 2000.
