= Dangberg Home Ranch Historic Park =

Protected area in Nevada, United States

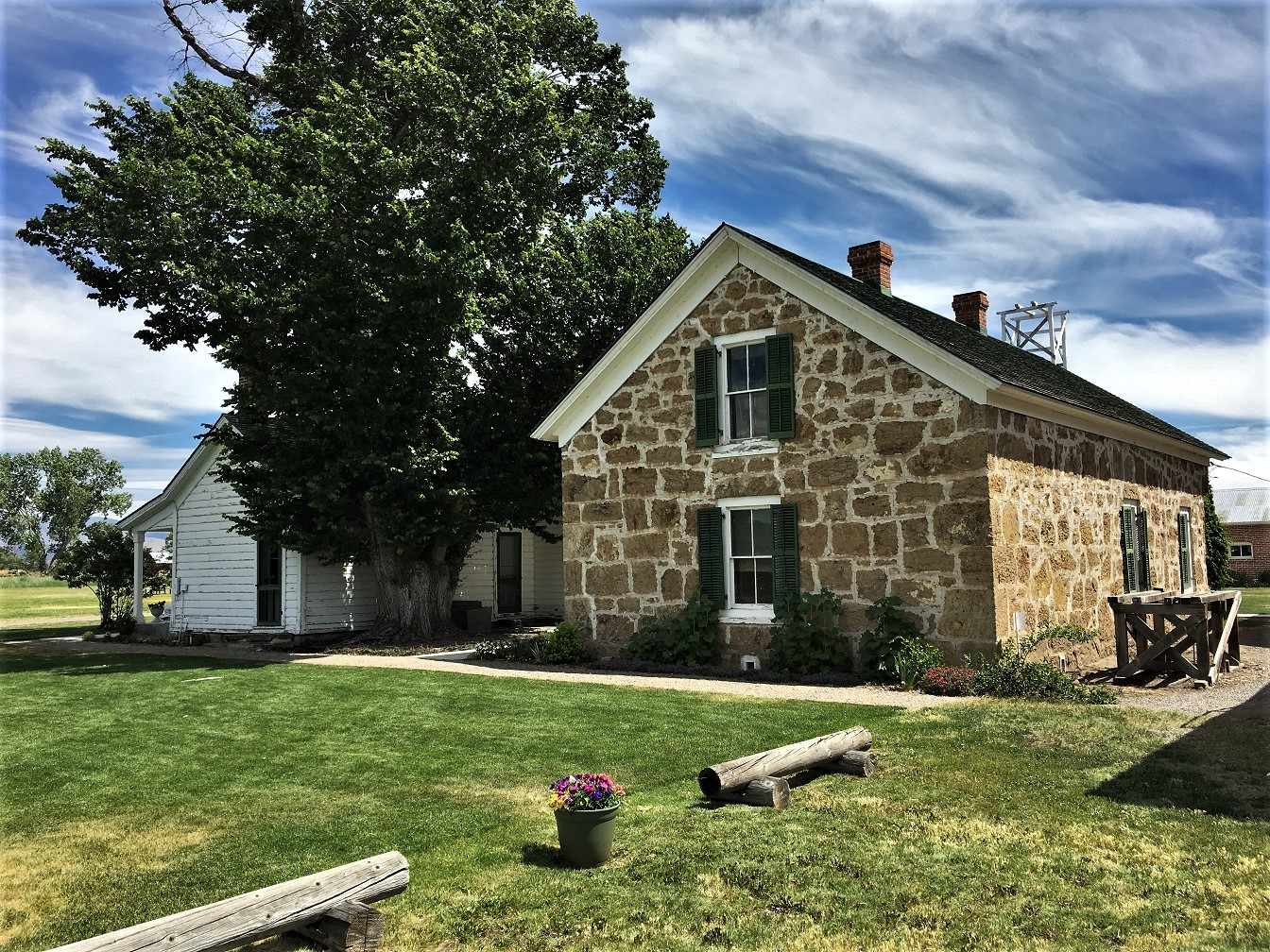

- Location within Nevada
- Location: Douglas, Nevada, United States
- Coordinates: 38°56′55″N 119°47′22″W
- Area: 5 acres (2.0 ha)
- Elevation: 4,705 ft (1,434 m)
- Governing body: Douglas County, Nevada

The Dangberg Home Ranch Historic Park is a Douglas County, Nevada, US, park, preserving one of the state's first ranches.

== History ==
The Dangberg Ranch was founded in 1857 by Heinrich Friedrich Dangberg, Sr. Dangberg built the ranch house, the first building on the ranch, in the early 1860s; a bunkhouse, cellar, and barn were added to the ranch in the 1870s. The ranch grew to 48,000 acres (19,000 ha) and became the largest in the Carson Valley.

The H. F. Dangberg Land and Live Stock Company formed to manage the ranch's activities, which included ranching cattle, pigs, and horses, growing hay, and slaughtering both their own and other ranchers' animals. In the 1900s, Dangberg's children, under the leadership of oldest son Henry Fred Dangberg, Jr., founded Minden on company land and commissioned most of its early buildings.

A decade later, several more buildings were added to the ranch, including a slaughterhouse, cook's quarters, two garages, and an entrance gateway. The Dangberg company prospered until the Great Depression, recovered after World War II, and remained in business at the ranch until 1978.

In 1960, Donald E. Bently bought some acreage in Carson Valley that had formerly been part of the Dangberg Ranch. He increased his holdings over the next two decades until he owned more than 35,000 acres (14,000 ha).

He renamed the land Bently Ranch and raised beef cattle and alfalfa. Bently's son Christopher purchased the former Minden Flour Milling Company and the neighboring Minden Creamery built by the Dangburg family, and has converted them for use as the Bently Heritage Estate Distillery.

The ranch home was added to the National Register of Historic Places on December 5, 1980.

== Park ==
Some 5.5 acres (2.2 ha) of the land is under the ownership of Douglas County and managed by the non-profit Friends of Dangberg Home Ranch. The county and the non-profit are in a joint effort to restore and preserve the historic buildings including the 15-room main residence. The park's buildings feature historic period artifacts. The ranch is located on Nevada State Route 88 west of Minden. The facility is a public day-use park, and guided history tours are available year-round by appointment.
