= Veterans Memorial Elementary School (Reno, Nevada) =

- Veterans Memorial School
- U.S. National Register of Historic Places
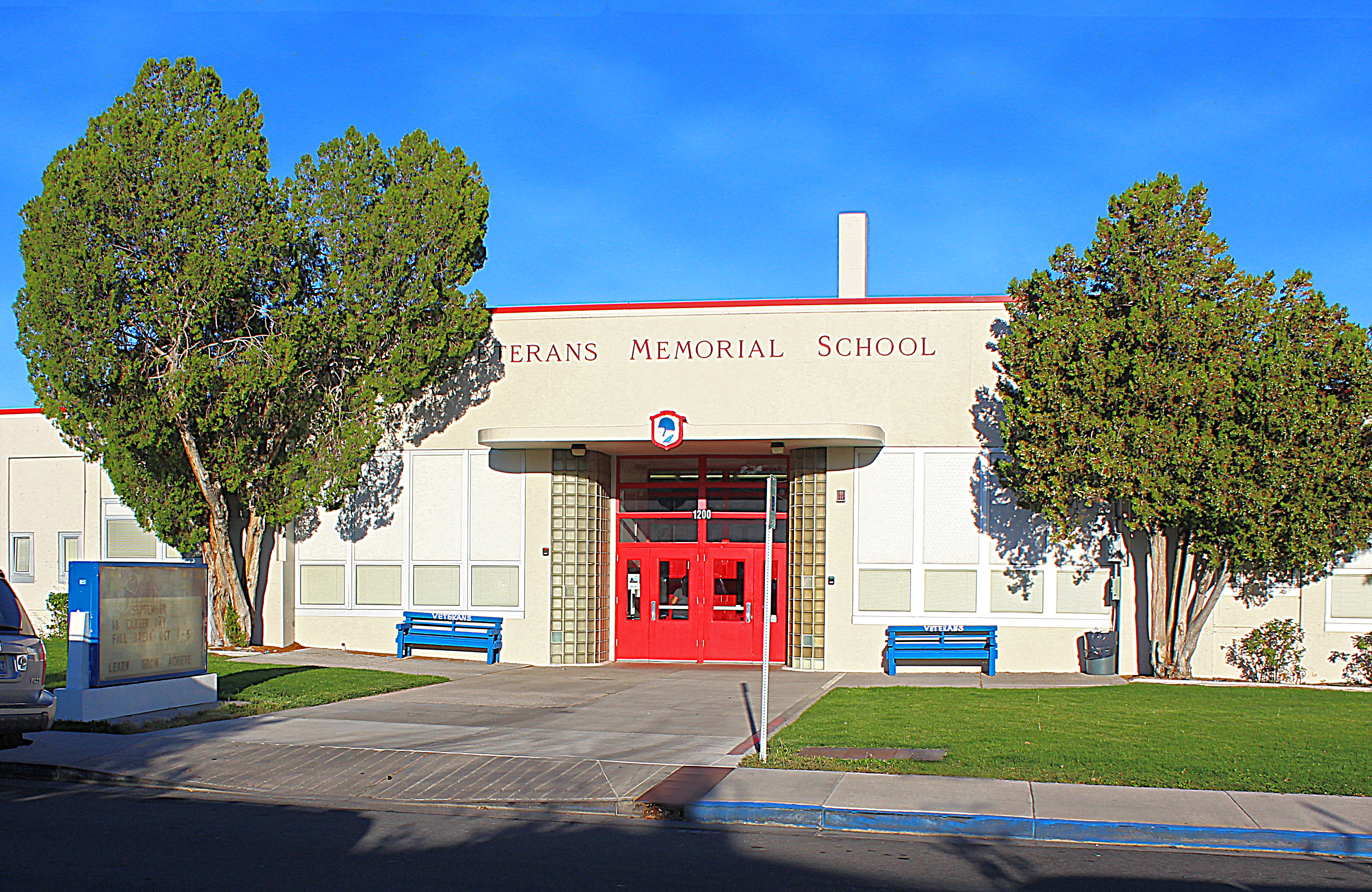

- Location within Nevada Location within the United States
- Location: 1200 Locust St., Reno, Nevada
- Coordinates: 39°30′48″N 119°47′53″W
- Area: 2 acres (0.81 ha)
- Built: 1949
- Architect: Mills, Russell
- Architectural style: Moderne
- NRHP reference No.: 93000690
- Added to NRHP: April 4, 1995

The Veterans Memorial Elementary School, also known as Veterans Memorial STEM Academy, at 1200 Locust St., is a public elementary school in Reno, Nevada, operated by the Washoe County School District. It occupies a historic Moderne-style building dating from 1949 that was designed by Nevada architect Russell Mills. It was listed on the National Register of Historic Places in 1995. It was deemed significant "for its role in the local history of education" and "for its Art Deco/Moderne style of architecture by a prominent local architect, Russell Mills."

Students zoned to Veterans Memorial are zoned to Vaughn Middle School and Earl Wooster High School.
