= Dresslerville, Nevada =

Unincorporated area in Nevada, U.S.

- Unincorporated area
- Coordinates: 38°53′53″N 119°43′01″W
- Country: United States
- State: Nevada
- County: Douglas
- Elevation: 4,895 ft (1,492 m)

Nevada Historical Marker
- Reference no.: 131

Dresslerville, also known as Dresslerville Colony, is an unincorporated area in Nevada that is home to a Washoe tribe community. It was named for Nevada state senator William F. Dressler who donated a 40-acre tract to the Washoe tribe. US Route 395 runs nearby and a historical marker commemorates the area's history. A school opened in the area in 1924. The community is along the East Fork Carson River.

The Dresslerville Colony is the largest Washoe community in population with 348 members as of 1991. It is located on 90 acres (36 ha) in Gardnerville near the Gardnerville Ranchos. Most of the tribe's public buildings are here including a community center, gymnasium, and park. There are five community representatives.

== See also ==
- Gardnerville, Nevada
