= Minden, Nevada =

- County seat
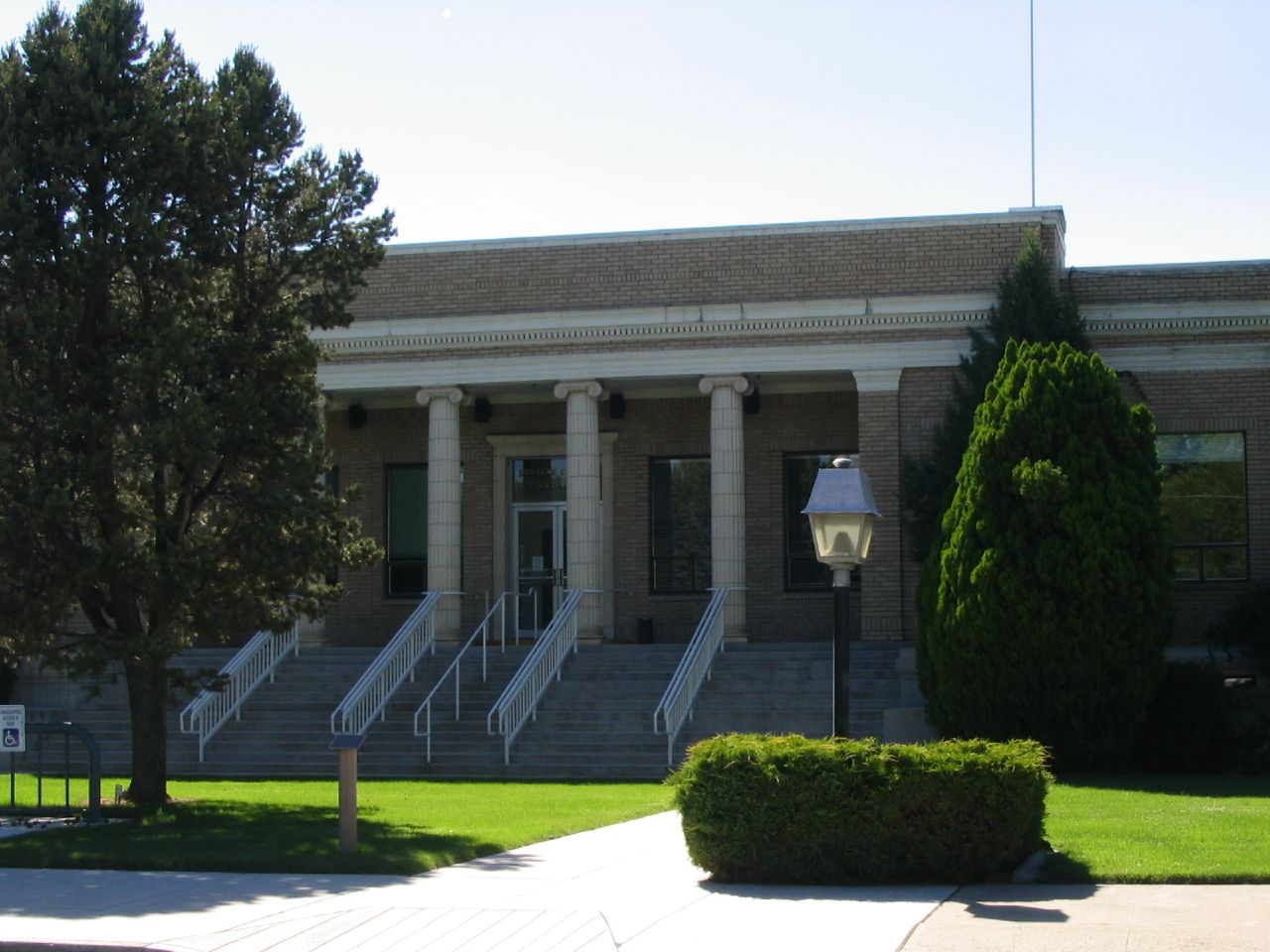
- Douglas County Courthouse (2006)

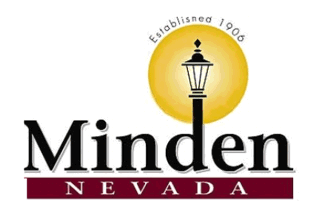
- Flag

- Location within Douglas County and Nevada
- Coordinates: 38°57′22″N 119°46′9″W
- Country: United States
- State: Nevada
- County: Douglas
- Founded: 1906
- Named for: Minden, Germany

Area
  - Total: 3.72 sq mi (9.64 km^{2})
  - Land: 3.70 sq mi (9.59 km^{2})
  - Water: 0.019 sq mi (0.05 km^{2})
- Elevation: 4,725 ft (1,440 m)

Population (2020)
  - Total: 3,442
  - Density: 929.9/sq mi (359.04/km^{2})
- Time zone: UTC−8 (Pacific (PST))
  - Summer (DST): UTC−7 (PDT)
- ZIP code: 89423
- Area code: 775
- FIPS code: 32-47000
- GNIS ID: 860600
- Website: townofminden.com

Nevada Historical Marker
- Reference no.: 130

Minden is a census-designated place (CDP) in Douglas County, Nevada, United States. As of the 2020 census, Minden had a population of 3,442. It is the county seat of Douglas County and is adjacent to the town of Gardnerville. The Douglas campus of the Western Nevada College is located in Minden.

== History ==
It was founded in 1906 by Heinrich Friedrich Dangberg Jr., who named it after the town of Minden, in the German state of Prussia, which was near his father's birthplace. A large share of the first settlers were Germans. Minden was founded on company land of the Dangberg Home Ranch and Dangberg commissioned most of the town's early buildings. Minden has had a post office since 1906.

=== Use of sundown siren and sundown town status ===
Minden sounded a "sundown siren" at 6pm almost every evening from 1917 until 2023, originally signifying that members of the Washoe Indian tribe were required to leave town by 6:30pm or face jail or fine. Douglas County fully repealed its sundown ordinance in the mid-1970s.

In 2021, the State of Nevada passed a law that prohibits communities from sounding signals associated with a past law "which required persons of a particular race, ethnicity, ancestry, national origin or color to leave the town by a certain time." Minden Town Manager J. D. Frisbee claimed the law doesn't apply to them stating, "There’s a (Minden) ordinance in place right now that says that the siren sounds every day in commemoration of our first responders. … It never went off at 6:30, when the county had an ordinance to get Native Americans out of town."

After another Nevada law targeting sundown sirens, S.B. 391, was passed in 2023, Minden finally silenced the siren. Marty Meeden, a retired elementary school teacher of Washoe descent, expressed relief, saying, "Did you hear about the partially deaf senior woman who was verbalized for being in town after sunset? Did you hear about the routine picking up of our young men who were beaten and then left out in the fields?... This is the history we as children learned in regards to the siren."

== Geography ==
According to the United States Census Bureau, the census-designated place (CDP) of Minden has a total area of 4.3 square miles (11 km^{2}), of which 4.3 square miles (11 km^{2}) is land and 0.04 square miles (0.10 km^{2}) (0.5%) is water.

The Carson Valley and Minden are considered one of the top gliding spots in the world. Flights of over 990 miles (1,600 km) have been made on sailplanes from this location. Its location, east of the Sierra Nevada range, favors lee wave formation. East of the Pine Nuts mountains is the Nevada desert, one of the best thermal generators in the world.

U.S. Highway 395 runs through Minden. It is also the terminus of State Route 88, which becomes California State Route 88 on the west side of the state line.

=== Climate ===
Minden has a cool semi-arid climate (Köppen BSk) with huge diurnal temperature variations during all seasons. Summers are hot to very hot during the day, with 68.5 afternoons topping 90 °F (32.2 °C) and 5.7 afternoons getting over 100 °F (37.8 °C). However, mornings even in summer are very cool to cold and between June and August, an average of 1.2 mornings will fall under freezing. Rainfall is very rare during the summer as the monsoon practically never reaches this far north: in July more than four years in ten record no measurable precipitation and only one in twenty expects 1 inch or 25.4 millimeters. Winter afternoons are cool and frequently sunny, but mornings are freezing to frigid. Temperatures of 0 °F (−17.8 °C) or below can be expected on two mornings each winter, although all but 4.7 afternoons each year can be expected to top freezing, whilst during the three winter months 45.9 afternoons will typically top 50 °F (10 °C). The hottest temperature on record is 109 °F (42.8 °C) on July 6, 2007 and the coldest −24 °F (−31.1 °C), which occurred on January 21, 1916, January 26, 1949 and February 7, 1989. The coldest afternoon was on January 9, 1937 when the temperature did not top 4 °F (−15.6 °C) and the hottest minimum 67 °F (19.4 °C) on August 28 and 29, 1906; June 25, 1927; and August 20, 1931.

The majority of precipitation occurs from winter Pacific storm systems, although the Sierra Nevada rain shadow limits the precipitation they produce in Nevada. The wettest "rain year" has been from July 1937 to June 1938 with 17.18 inches (436.4 mm) and the driest from July 1959 to June 1960 with 3.31 inches (84.1 mm). The wettest day on record has been December 30, 2002 with 3.90 inches or 99.1 millimeters. With at least 7.90 inches or 200.7 millimeters, January 1909 was the wettest single month on record. Winter afternoons are warm enough in Minden that most precipitation occurs as rain, although the mean snowfall is 21.8 inches or 0.55 meters. The cold, wet month of January 1916, however, saw as much as 52.0 inches (1.3 m) of snow and the season from July 1908 to June 1909, 70 inches (1.8 m); however, no measurable snow fell between July 1962 and June 1963.

Climate data for Minden, Nevada, 1991–2020 normals, extremes 1906–present
| Month | Jan | Feb | Mar | Apr | May | Jun | Jul | Aug | Sep | Oct | Nov | Dec | Year |
|---|---|---|---|---|---|---|---|---|---|---|---|---|---|
| Record high °F (°C) | 72 (22) | 77 (25) | 84 (29) | 90 (32) | 98 (37) | 105 (41) | 109 (43) | 105 (41) | 102 (39) | 94 (34) | 84 (29) | 73 (23) | 109 (43) |
| Mean maximum °F (°C) | 63.3 (17.4) | 67.5 (19.7) | 75.2 (24.0) | 81.8 (27.7) | 89.3 (31.8) | 96.8 (36.0) | 101.3 (38.5) | 100.0 (37.8) | 96.0 (35.6) | 87.7 (30.9) | 74.5 (23.6) | 64.6 (18.1) | 102.2 (39.0) |
| Mean daily maximum °F (°C) | 46.6 (8.1) | 51.4 (10.8) | 58.2 (14.6) | 63.8 (17.7) | 72.6 (22.6) | 82.6 (28.1) | 91.2 (32.9) | 90.3 (32.4) | 83.4 (28.6) | 71.2 (21.8) | 56.8 (13.8) | 45.8 (7.7) | 67.8 (19.9) |
| Daily mean °F (°C) | 32.8 (0.4) | 36.7 (2.6) | 42.5 (5.8) | 47.1 (8.4) | 55.2 (12.9) | 63.1 (17.3) | 70.1 (21.2) | 68.5 (20.3) | 61.8 (16.6) | 51.1 (10.6) | 39.8 (4.3) | 32.2 (0.1) | 50.1 (10.0) |
| Mean daily minimum °F (°C) | 19.0 (−7.2) | 22.1 (−5.5) | 26.8 (−2.9) | 30.4 (−0.9) | 37.7 (3.2) | 43.7 (6.5) | 49.0 (9.4) | 46.6 (8.1) | 40.2 (4.6) | 30.9 (−0.6) | 22.8 (−5.1) | 18.7 (−7.4) | 32.3 (0.2) |
| Mean minimum °F (°C) | 3.0 (−16.1) | 7.7 (−13.5) | 13.6 (−10.2) | 18.5 (−7.5) | 26.6 (−3.0) | 32.0 (0.0) | 40.7 (4.8) | 37.9 (3.3) | 30.4 (−0.9) | 18.7 (−7.4) | 8.5 (−13.1) | 2.2 (−16.6) | −3.1 (−19.5) |
| Record low °F (°C) | −24 (−31) | −24 (−31) | −9 (−23) | 9 (−13) | 16 (−9) | 22 (−6) | 29 (−2) | 28 (−2) | 20 (−7) | 3 (−16) | −12 (−24) | −22 (−30) | −24 (−31) |
| Average precipitation inches (mm) | 1.70 (43) | 1.30 (33) | 1.25 (32) | 0.49 (12) | 0.61 (15) | 0.33 (8.4) | 0.25 (6.4) | 0.26 (6.6) | 0.21 (5.3) | 0.61 (15) | 0.79 (20) | 1.54 (39) | 9.34 (235.7) |
| Average snowfall inches (cm) | 5.6 (14) | 4.1 (10) | 3.4 (8.6) | 1.5 (3.8) | 0.1 (0.25) | 0.1 (0.25) | 0.0 (0.0) | 0.0 (0.0) | 0.0 (0.0) | 0.2 (0.51) | 1.6 (4.1) | 5.2 (13) | 21.8 (54.51) |
| Average precipitation days (≥ 0.01 in) | 6.4 | 6.0 | 4.5 | 3.5 | 3.3 | 1.8 | 1.8 | 1.9 | 1.7 | 2.5 | 4.1 | 5.5 | 43.0 |
| Average snowy days (≥ 0.1 in) | 2.8 | 1.9 | 1.6 | 0.8 | 0.2 | 0.0 | 0.0 | 0.0 | 0.0 | 0.1 | 0.9 | 2.6 | 10.9 |
Source 1: NOAA
Source 2: National Weather Service

== Demographics ==
Historical population
| Census | Pop. | Note | %± |
|---|---|---|---|
| 1990 | 1,441 | | — |
| 2000 | 2,836 | | 96.8% |
| 2010 | 3,001 | | 5.8% |
| 2020 | 3,442 | | 14.7% |
U.S. Decennial Census

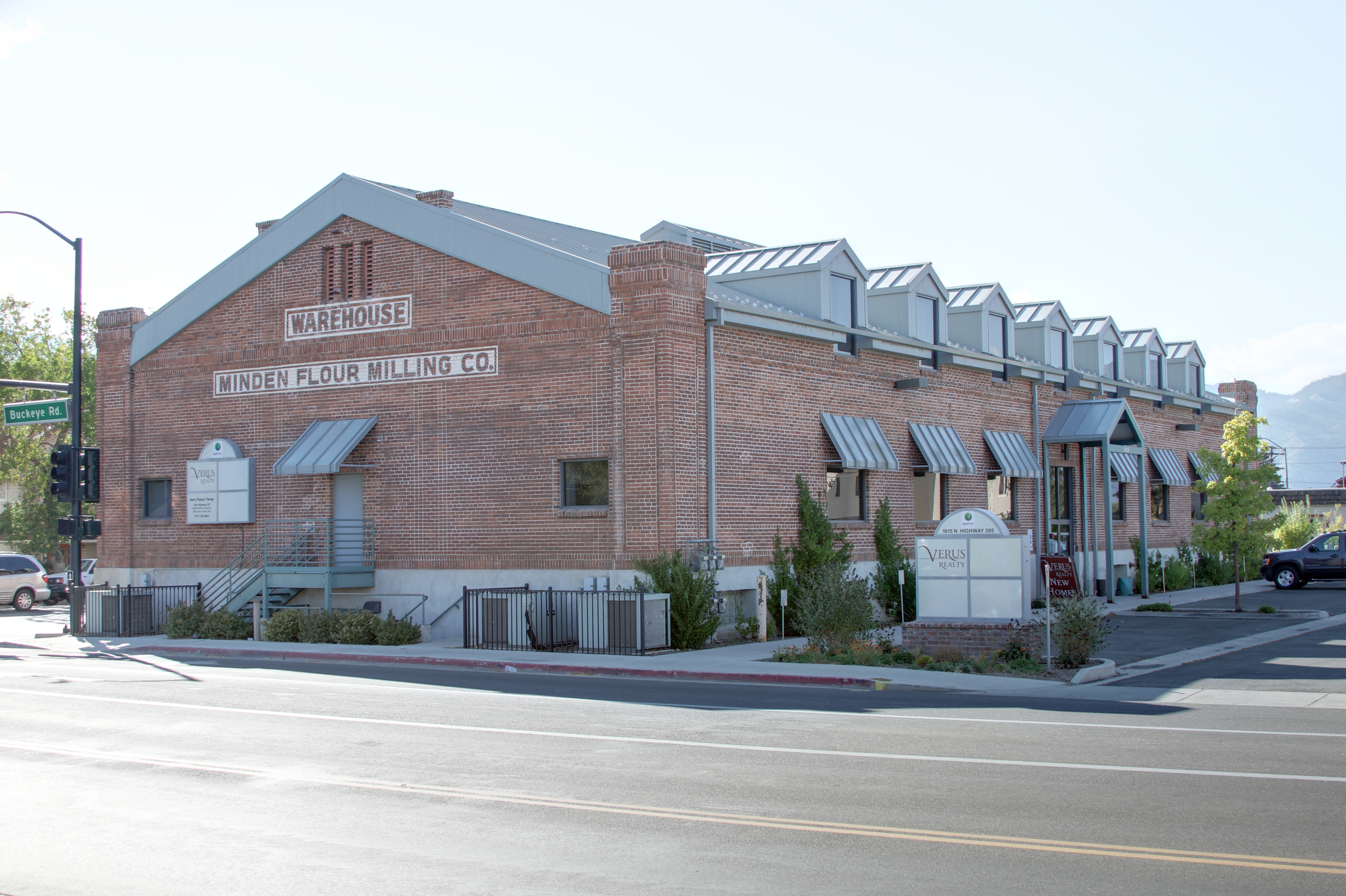
The Minden Flour Milling Company, September 2013, one of eight sites in Minden listed on the National Register of Historic Places

=== 2020 census ===
As of the 2020 census, Minden had a population of 3,442. The median age was 54.8 years. 17.8% of residents were under the age of 18 and 33.6% of residents were 65 years of age or older. For every 100 females there were 87.6 males, and for every 100 females age 18 and over there were 84.0 males age 18 and over.

99.9% of residents lived in urban areas, while 0.1% lived in rural areas.

There were 1,573 households in Minden, of which 21.4% had children under the age of 18 living in them. Of all households, 51.7% were married-couple households, 14.7% were households with a male householder and no spouse or partner present, and 29.6% were households with a female householder and no spouse or partner present. About 31.7% of all households were made up of individuals and 20.0% had someone living alone who was 65 years of age or older.

There were 1,682 housing units, of which 6.5% were vacant. The homeowner vacancy rate was 1.1% and the rental vacancy rate was 3.8%.

Racial composition as of the 2020 census
| Race | Number | Percent |
|---|---|---|
| White | 2,930 | 85.1% |
| Black or African American | 19 | 0.6% |
| American Indian and Alaska Native | 34 | 1.0% |
| Asian | 58 | 1.7% |
| Native Hawaiian and Other Pacific Islander | 4 | 0.1% |
| Some other race | 95 | 2.8% |
| Two or more races | 302 | 8.8% |
| Hispanic or Latino (of any race) | 323 | 9.4% |

=== 2000 census ===
As of the census of 2000, there were 2,836 people, 1,166 households, and 839 families residing in the CDP. The population density was 664.2 inhabitants per square mile (256.4/km^{2}). There were 1,231 housing units at an average density of 288.3 per square mile (111.3/km^{2}). The racial makeup of the CDP was 94.0% White, 0.1% African American, 0.7% Native American, 1.1% Asian, 0.1% Pacific Islander, 2.1% from other races, and 1.9% from two or more races. Hispanic or Latino of any race were 6.6% of the population.

There were 1,166 households, out of which 28.1% had children under the age of 18 living with them, 62.4% were married couples living together, 7.7% had a female householder with no husband present, and 28.0% were non-families. 23.0% of all households were made up of individuals, and 11.5% had someone living alone who was 65 years of age or older. The average household size was 2.38 and the average family size was 2.78.

In the CDP the population was spread out, with 21.9% under the age of 18, 4.4% from 18 to 24, 22.7% from 25 to 44, 27.5% from 45 to 64, and 23.5% who were 65 years of age or older. The median age was 46 years. For every 100 females, there were 95.5 males. For every 100 females age 18 and over, there were 92.4 males.

The median income for a household in the CDP was $56,795, and the median income for a family was $64,375. Males had a median income of $40,833 versus $34,700 for females. The per capita income for the CDP was $30,405. About 3.7% of families and 5.4% of the population were below the poverty line, including 10.2% of those under age 18 and 1.5% of those age 65 or over.

== Economy ==
A 712,000 sq ft (66,100 m^{2}) Starbucks Distribution Center was constructed in 2018 to support regional supply chain management. The warehouse project brought at least 500 jobs to the area.

== Education ==
All of Douglas County is in the Douglas County School District.

Minden has a public library, a branch of the Douglas County Public Library.

== Media ==
- Carson Valley Times
- The Record-Courier

== Notable people ==
- Donald E. Bently – businessman; long term resident of Mindenol in Minden
- Shaaron Claridge - voice actress credited with providing the police dispatch voice work for Adam-12, Dragnet and Columbo.
- Shawn Estes – baseball player; attended high school in Minden
- Nicholas Furlong – songwriter and producer
- Howard D. McKibben – federal judge; practiced law in Minden from 1967 to 1971.
- Jeff Nady - football coach; attended high school in Minden
- David Derek Stacton – author; born in Minden
- Sable Starr – groupie; died in Minden
- Tanner Thorson – racing driver; born in Minden
- Eric Whitacre – composer; attended high school in Minden

== See also ==
- List of census-designated places in Nevada
- List of sundown towns in the United States
