= Douglas County High School =

Douglas County High School may refer to:

- Douglas County High School (Colorado)
- Douglas County High School (Douglasville, Georgia)
- Douglas County High School (Nevada)
