= Frederic Joseph DeLongchamps =

American architect

- Born: June 2, 1882; Reno, Nevada, US
- Died: February 11, 1969 (aged 86); Reno, Nevada, US
- Occupation: Architect
- Practice: DeLongchamps, O'Brien and Wells
- Buildings: Washoe County Courthouse; Reno Main Post Office; Riverside Hotel

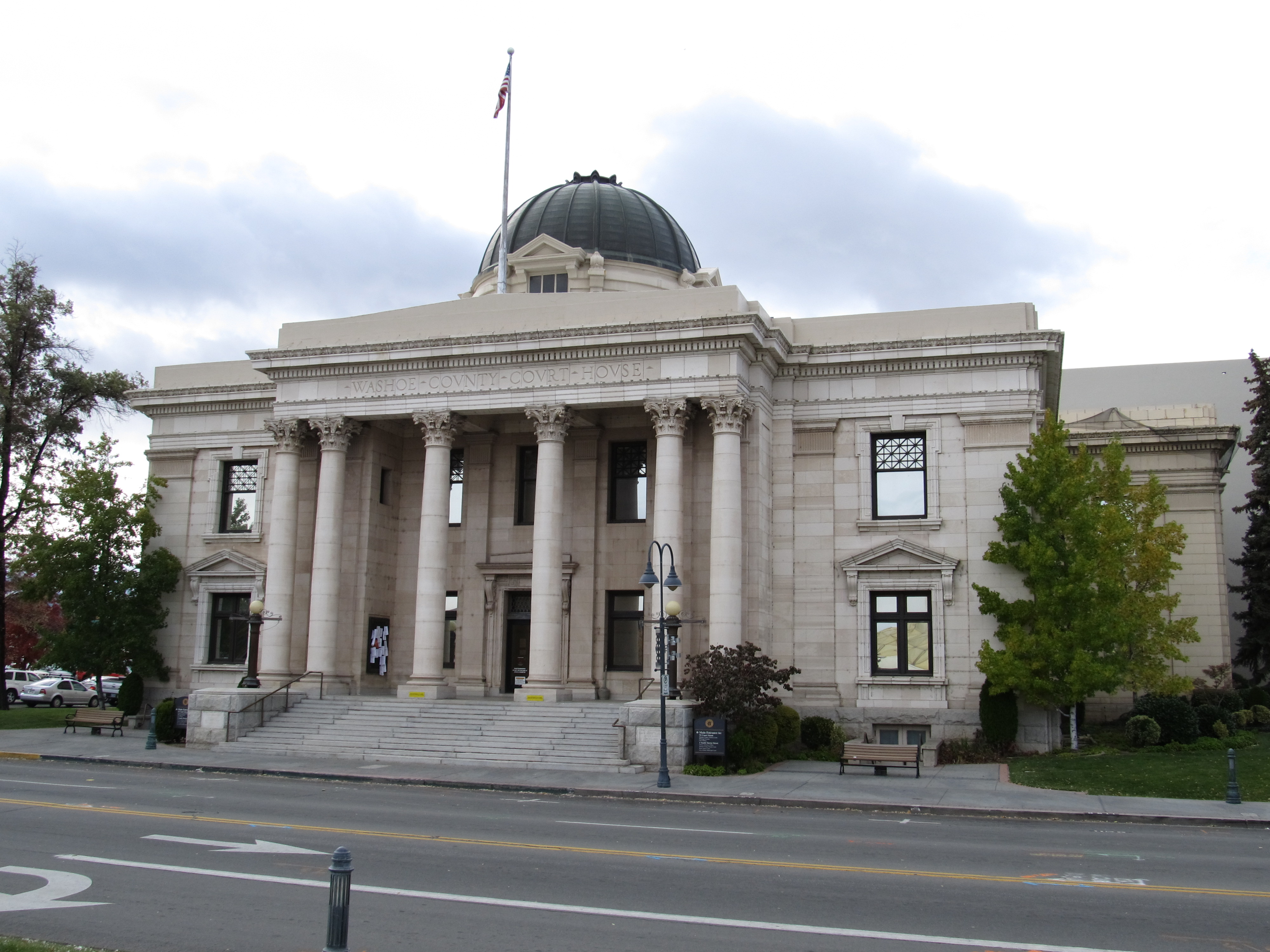
The Washoe County Courthouse in Reno, designed by DeLongchamps and completed in 1911, with additions completed in 1946, 1949 and 1963 by DeLongchamps & O'Brien.

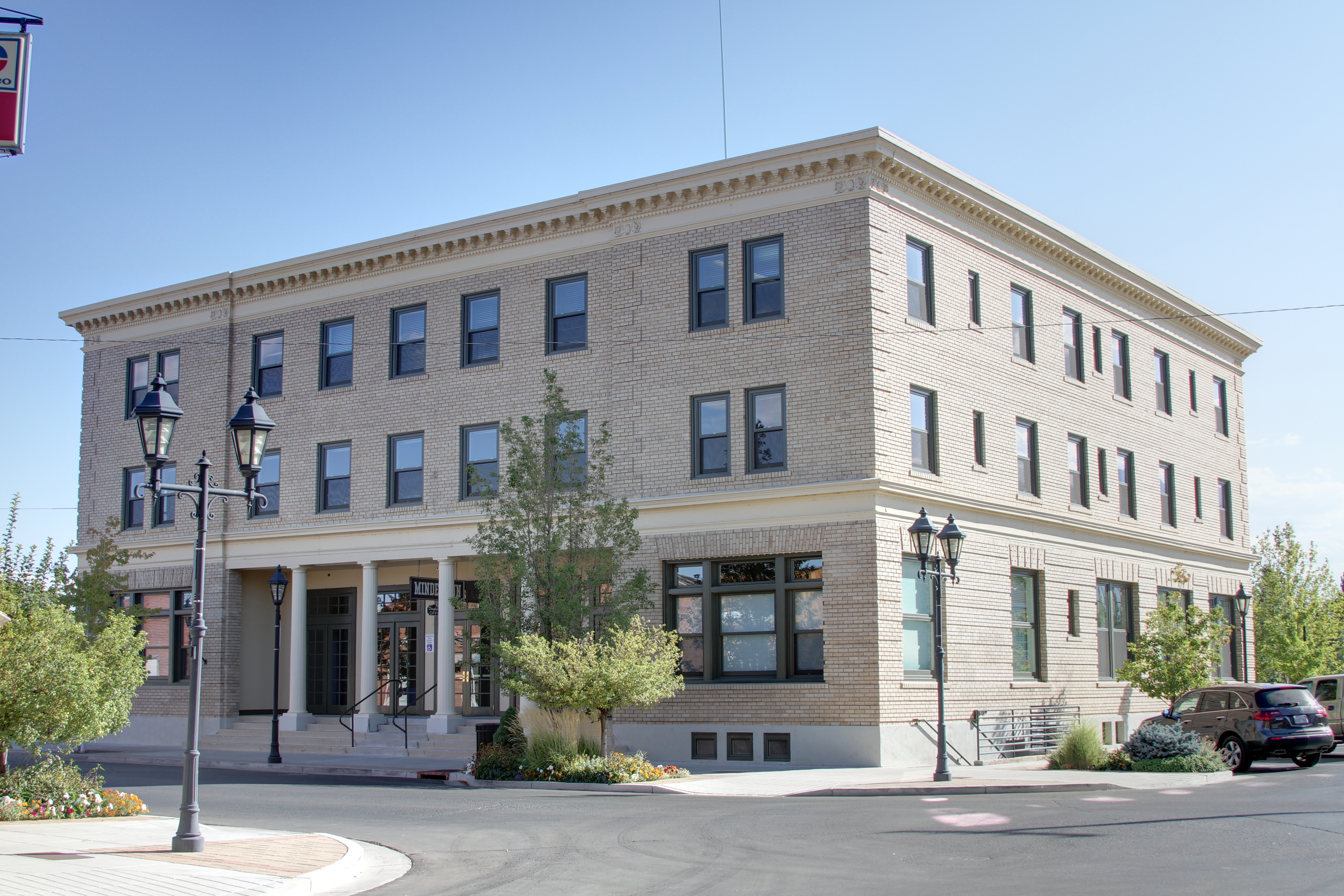
The Minden Inn, designed by DeLongchamps and completed in 1916.

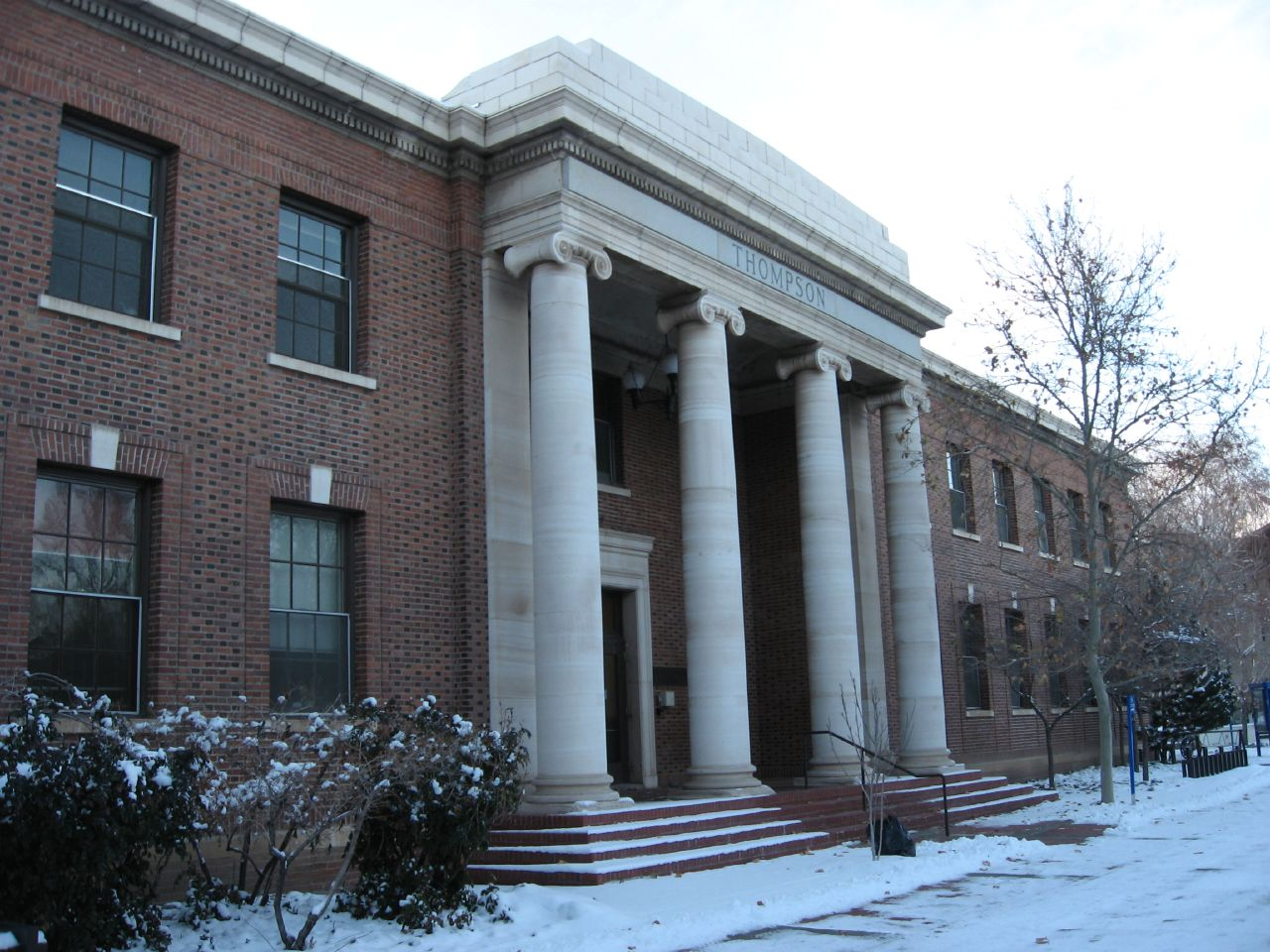
The Thompson Building of the University of Nevada, Reno, designed by DeLongchamps and completed in 1920.

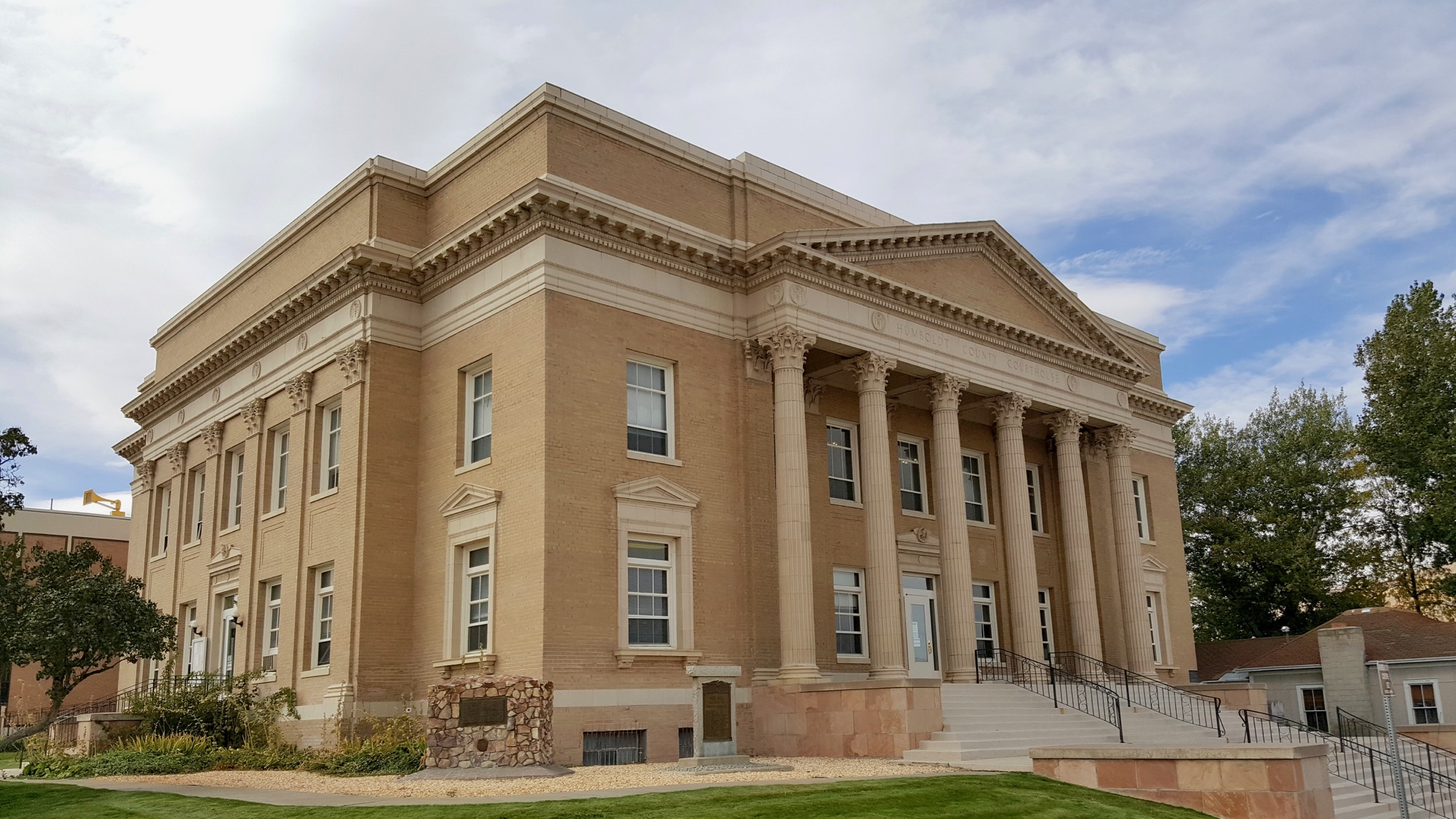
The Humboldt County Courthouse in Winnemucca, designed by DeLongchamps and completed in 1921.

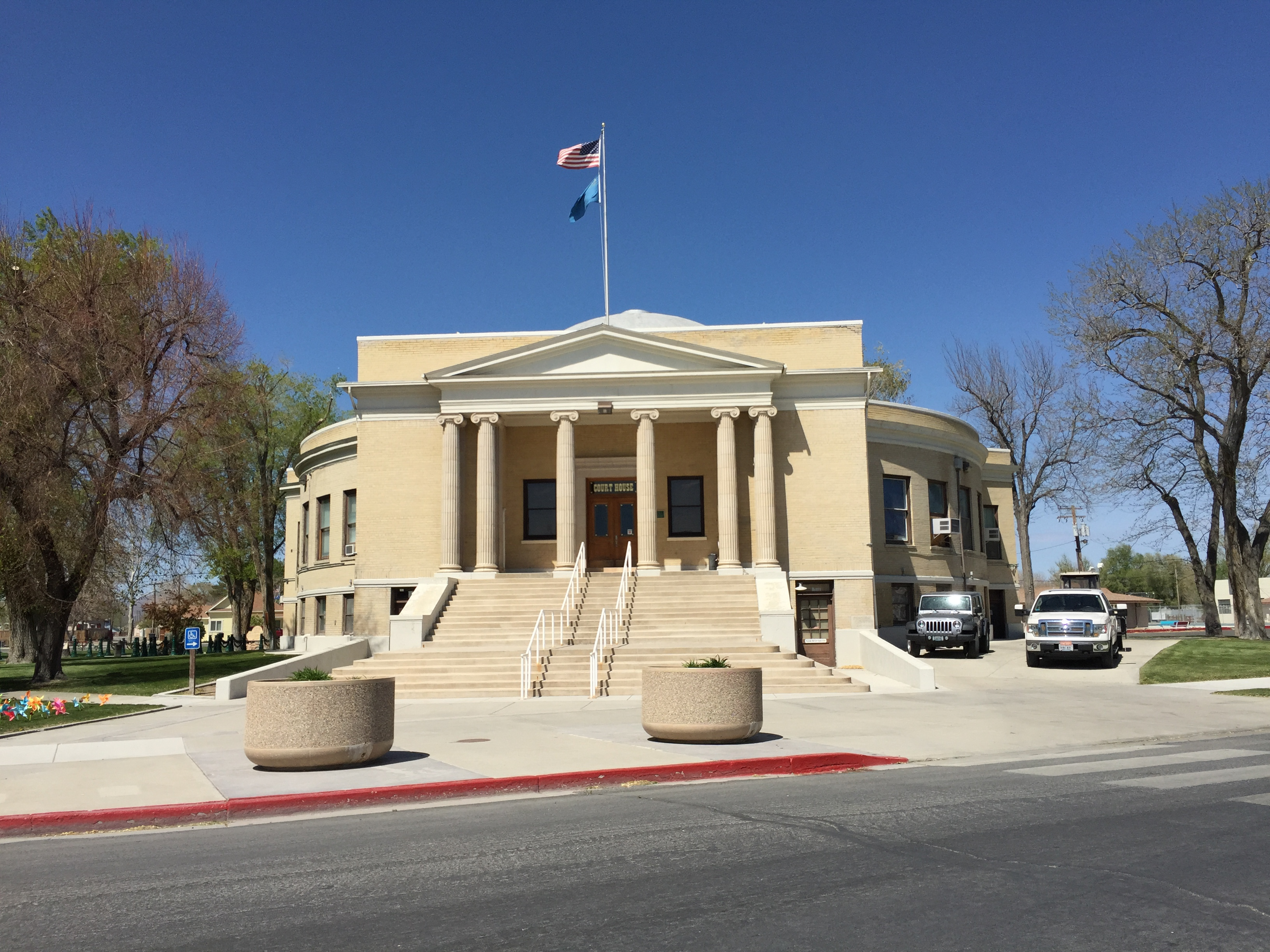
The Pershing County Courthouse in Lovelock, designed by DeLongchamps and completed in 1921.

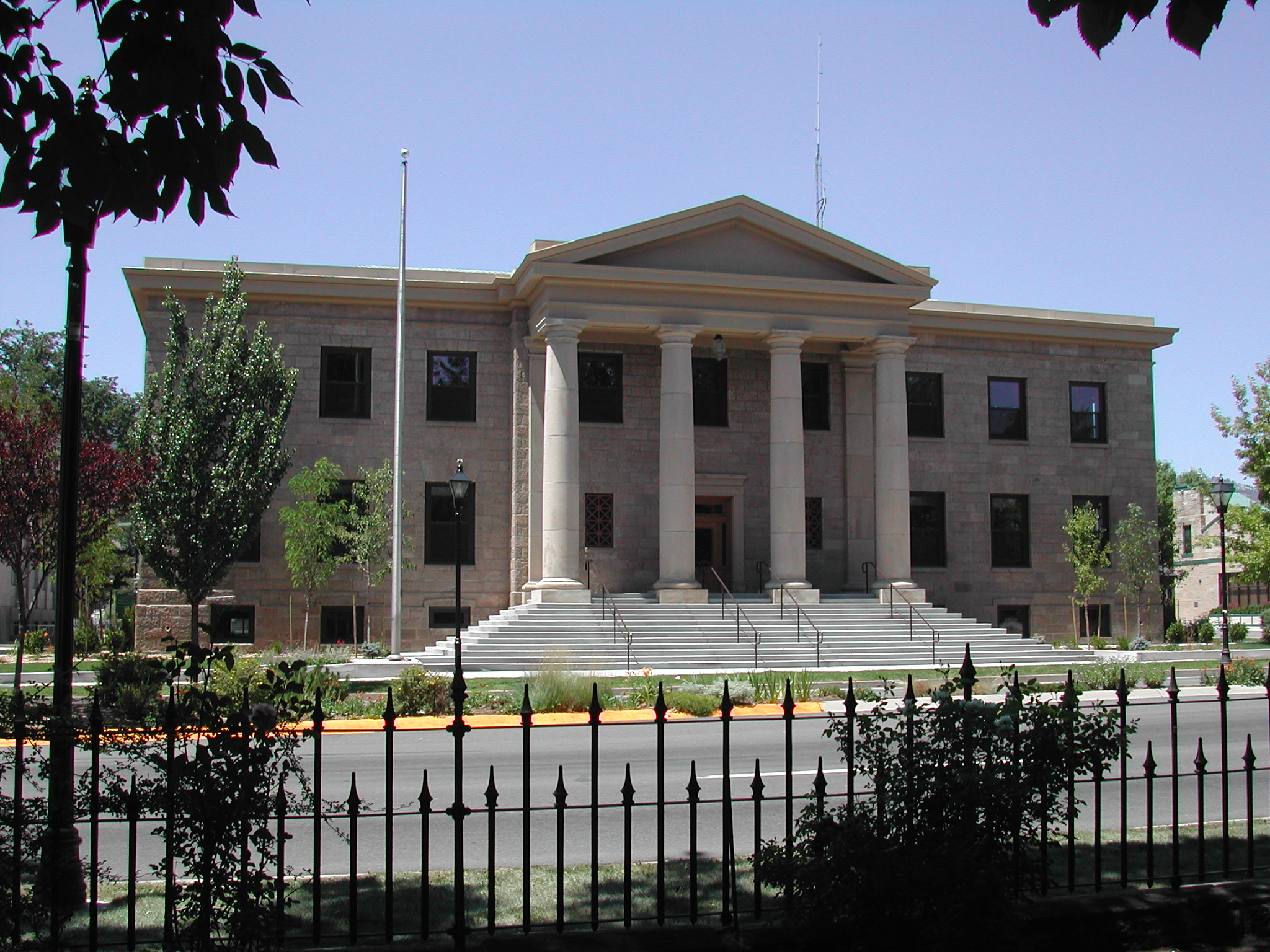
The former Ormsby County Courthouse in Carson City, designed by DeLongchamps and completed in 1922.

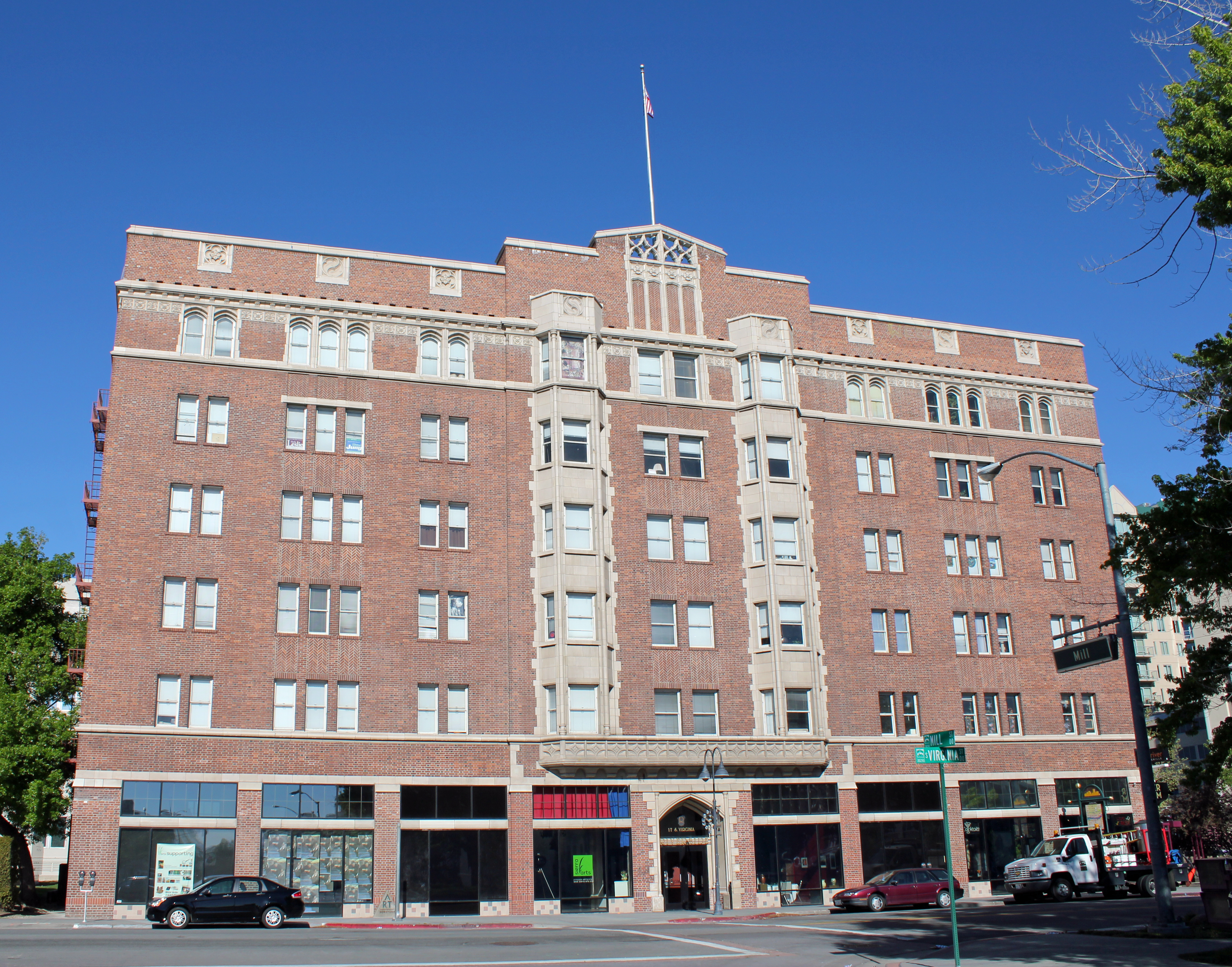
The Riverside Hotel in Reno, designed by DeLongchamps and completed in 1927.

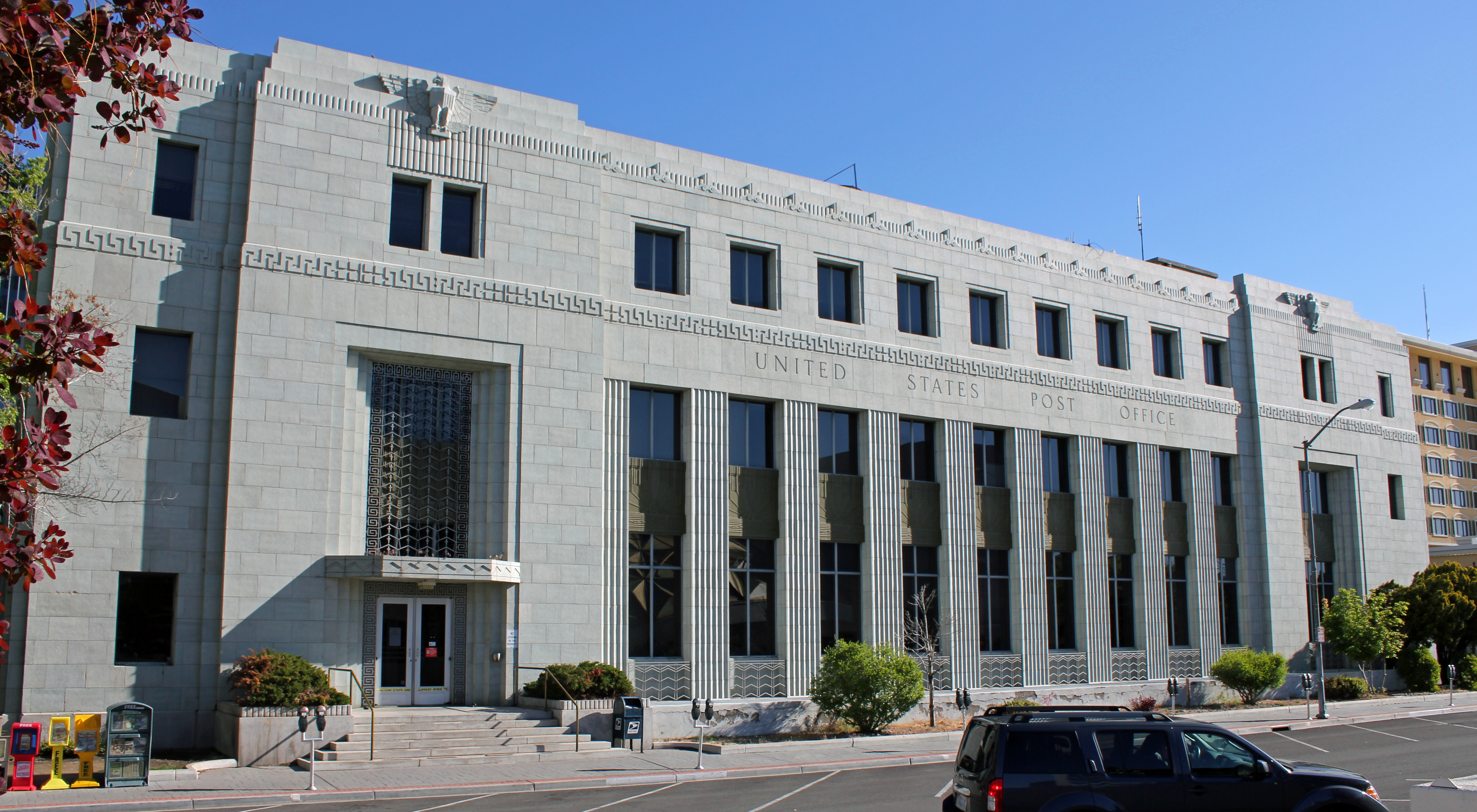
The Reno Main Post Office, designed by DeLongchamps and completed in 1934.

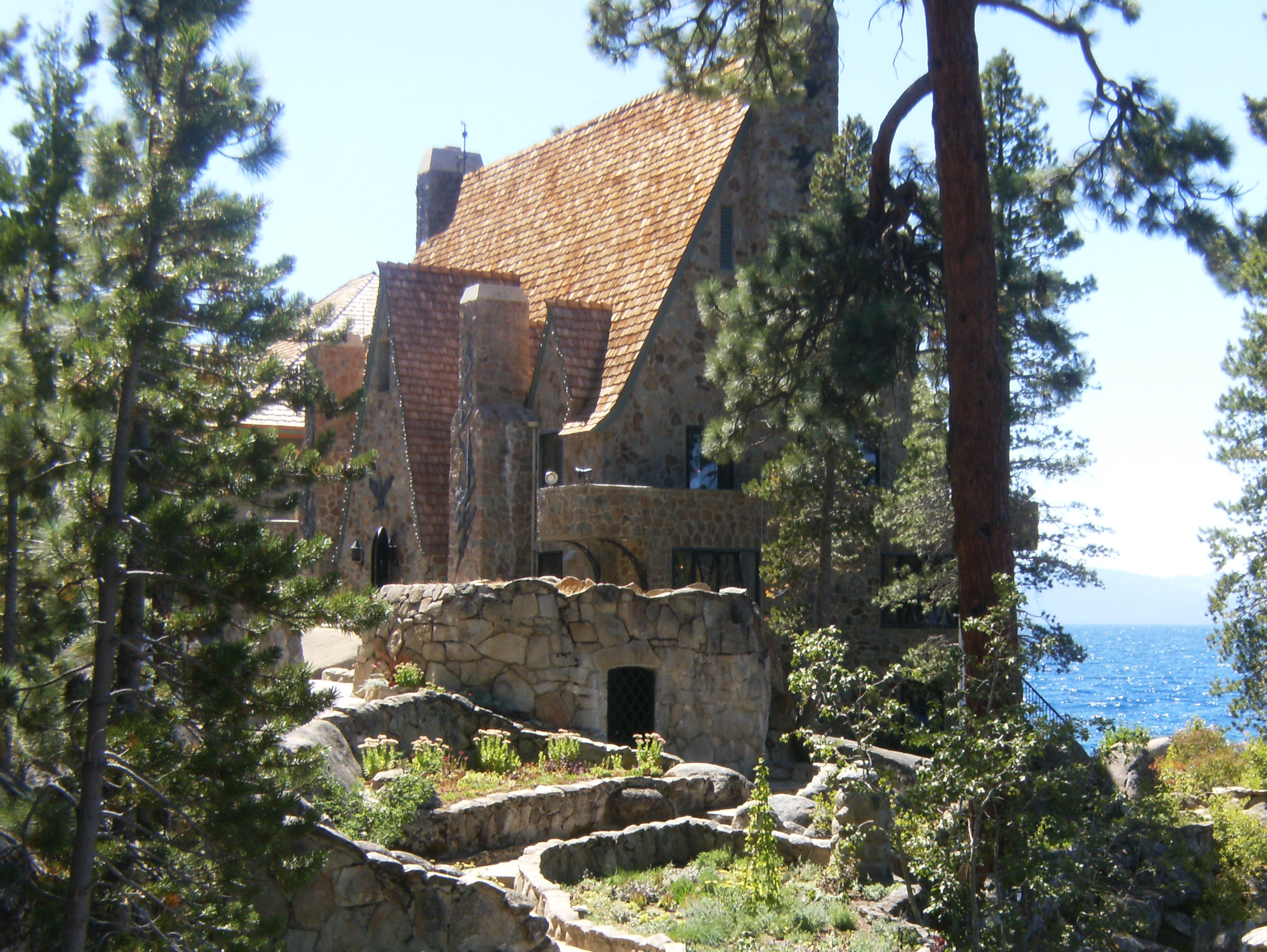
Thunderbird Lodge on Lake Tahoe, designed by DeLongchamps and completed in 1938.

Frederic Joseph DeLongchamps (June 2, 1882 – February 11, 1969) was an American architect. He was one of Nevada's most prolific architects, yet is notable for entering the architectural profession with no extensive formal training. He has also been known as Frederick J. DeLongchamps, and was described by the latter name in an extensive review of the historic importance of his works which led to many of them being listed on the U.S. National Register of Historic Places in the 1980s.

== Life ==
=== Early life and education ===
Born Frederic Joseph DeLonchamps in Reno, Nevada on January 2, 1882, the son of Felix DeLongchamps and Exilda Gibeau. He was raised in Washoe County, graduating from Reno High School in 1900, then the University of Nevada in 1904 with a degree in mining engineering.

=== Career ===
DeLongchamps was employed as a mining engineer and draftsman in Inyo County, California before he embarked on a career in architecture. He spent a short time in San Francisco where he may have apprenticed, but he returned to Nevada in 1907 and formed a partnership with Ira W. Tesch.

From 1909 to 1938, DeLongchamps maintained his own firm and became one of Nevada's most prolific architects. He designed both private and public buildings including nine county courthouses in Nevada and California. He was awarded the contract to design the Nevada Buildings for the Panama-Pacific International Exposition (1915), winning a silver medal for his work. DeLongchamps was appointed Nevada State Architect in 1919 and was the only person to hold the position, which was abolished in 1926. During this time, he designed many state buildings.

In 1939, George L. F. O'Brien joined DeLongchamps in partnership in Reno, and Hewitt Wells added his name to the association in 1962. The architectural firm of DeLongchamps, O'Brien and Wells continued to design buildings, mainly in the Reno area, into the 1960s.

=== Legacy ===
DeLongchamps died in Reno, Nevada on February 11, 1969. He was survived by his son, Galen (08 Aug 1916-22 Jul 2001). He was the father-in-law of the noted poet and artist Joanne de Longchamps (that is how she spelled the name), who married DeLongchamps's adopted son Galen.

Russell Mills is one who worked as a draftsman for DeLongchamps and went on to have a career as an independent architect.

Many of DeLongchamps' works have been listed on the National Register.

== Works ==
=== F. J. DeLongchamps, 1909–1939 ===
- 1910 – Nevada-California-Oregon Railroad Depot (former), (Note: Listed on the United States National Register of Historic Places.) 325 E 4th St, Reno, Nevada
- 1911 – Washoe County Courthouse, 117 S Virginia St, Reno, Nevada
- 1912 – Lakeview station (former), 1400 Center St, Lakeview, Oregon
- 1912 – Lyon County Courthouse, 31 S Main St, Yerington, Nevada
- 1913 – Nevada State Capitol Senate and Assembly wings, 101 N Carson St, Carson City, Nevada
- 1914 – Clark County Courthouse, (Note: Demolished.) S 2nd St and E Carson Ave, Las Vegas, Nevada
- 1914 – Joseph Giraud house, 442 Flint St, Reno, Nevada
- 1914 – I.O.O.F. Building, Mason Valley, 1 S Main St, Yerington, Nevada
- 1914 – Jones Center, (Note: A contributing building to the University of Nevada Reno Historic District, NRHP-listed in 1987.) University of Nevada, Reno, Reno, Nevada
- 1914 – Oats Park Grammar School, 167 E Park St, Fallon, Nevada
- 1914 – Modoc County Courthouse (Alturas, California) 204 S Court St., Alturas, CA
- 1915 – Douglas County High School, 1479 US Hwy 395 N, Gardnerville, Nevada
- 1915 – Minden Wool Warehouse, 1615 Railroad Ave, Minden, Nevada
- 1915 – Nevada Building, Panama–Pacific International Exposition, San Francisco
- 1915 – Reno National Bank Building, 204 N Virginia St, Reno, Nevada
- 1916 – Douglas County Courthouse, 1616 8th St, Minden, Nevada
- 1916 – Minden Butter Manufacturing Company, 1617 Water St, Minden, Nevada
- 1916 – Minden Inn, 1594 Esmeralda Ave, Minden, Nevada
- 1917 – Mary Lee Nichols School, 400-406 Pyramid Way, Sparks, Nevada
- 1918 – Farmers Bank of Carson Valley, 1597 Esmeralda Ave, Minden, Nevada
- 1920 – Robert L. Douglass ranch house, (Note: A contributing building to the Douglass-Frey Ranch, NRHP-listed in 2015. Douglass had previously built the Robert L. Douglass House in town.) 1075 Dodge Ln, Fallon, Nevada
- 1920 – Thompson Building, University of Nevada, Reno, Reno, Nevada
- 1921 – Humboldt County Courthouse, 50 W 5th St, Winnemucca, Nevada
- 1921 – Pershing County Courthouse, 400 Main St, Lovelock, Nevada
- 1922 – Heroes Memorial Building, (Note: A contributing building to the Carson City Public Buildings, NRHP-listed in 1987.) 100 N Carson St, Carson City, Nevada
- 1922 – Ormsby County Courthouse, 198 N Carson St, Carson City, Nevada
- 1922 – Vachina Apartments-California Apartments, 45 California Ave, Reno, Nevada
- 1923 – Humboldt Hotel, S Bridge St and E Winnemucca Blvd, Winnemucca, Nevada
- 1923 – Susanville City Hall, 66 N Lassen St, Susanville, California
- 1925 – McCarthy-Platt house remodeling, 1000 Plumas St, Reno, Nevada
- 1926 – Mackay School of Mines Building additions, University of Nevada, Reno, Reno, Nevada
- 1927 – Knights of Pythias Hall, 421 Court St, Elko, Nevada
- 1927 – Riverside Hotel, 17 S Virginia St, Reno, Nevada
- 1928 – Alpine County Courthouse, 14777 CA-89, Markleeville, California
- 1929 – Webster School, 270 Laramie St, Markleeville, California
- 1930 – Mackay Science Building, University of Nevada, Reno, Reno, Nevada
- 1930 – Nevada Bell Telephone Company Building, 320 N Carson St, Carson City, Nevada
- 1931 – Fallon City Hall, 55 E Williams Ave, Fallon, Nevada
- 1931 – Washoe County Library-Sparks Branch, 814 Victorian St, Sparks, Nevada
- 1932 – Immaculate Conception Church, 590 Pyramid Way, Sparks, Nevada
- 1934 – Reno Main Post Office, 50 S Virginia St, Reno, Nevada
- 1935 – Yerington Grammar School addition, 112 N California St, Yerington, Nevada
- 1937 – Supreme Court of Nevada (former), 100 N Carson St, Carson City, Nevada
- 1938 – Thunderbird Lodge, 5000 NV-28 Incline Village, Nevada
- 1939 – Robert H. Mitchell School, 1216 12th St, Sparks, Nevada

=== DeLongchamps & O'Brien, 1939-1962 ===
- 1945 – Virginia Street Gym, University of Nevada, Reno, Reno, Nevada
- 1952 – United States Bureau of Mines Building, (Note: Mines) University of Nevada, Reno, Reno, Nevada
- 1959 – Nevada Industrial Commission Building, 515 E Musser St, Carson City, Nevada
- 1959 – Union Federal Savings and Loan Association Building, 195 S Sierra St, Reno, Nevada
- 1963 – Scrugham Engineering and Mines Building, University of Nevada, Reno, Reno, Nevada
- 1963 – Washoe County Courthouse addition, 117 S Virginia St, Reno, Nevada

=== DeLongchamps, O'Brien & Wells, 1962–1965 ===
- 1964 – Clayton Middle School, 1295 Wyoming Ave, Reno, Nevada
- 1965 – Reno City Hall (former), (Note: Credited to partner Hewitt C. Wells.) (Note: Now the Terry Lee Wells Nevada Discovery Museum.) 490 S Center St, Reno, Nevada
- 1966 – Washoe County Library, 301 S Center St, Reno, Nevada

== Awards ==
- Silver medal, Panama Pacific International Exposition, 1915, Nevada Buildings
- Distinguished Service Award, University of Nevada, Reno, 1966

== See also ==
- A Guide to the Frederic J. Delongchamps Architectural Drawings And Papers Collection, University of Nevada, Reno
