= Humboldt County Courthouse =

Humboldt County Courthouse may refer to:

- Humboldt County Courthouse (Iowa), Dakota City, Iowa
- Humboldt County Courthouse (Nevada), Winnemucca, Nevada
