= University of Nevada Reno Historic District =

Historic district in Nevada, United States

- U.S. National Register of Historic Places
- U.S. Historic district
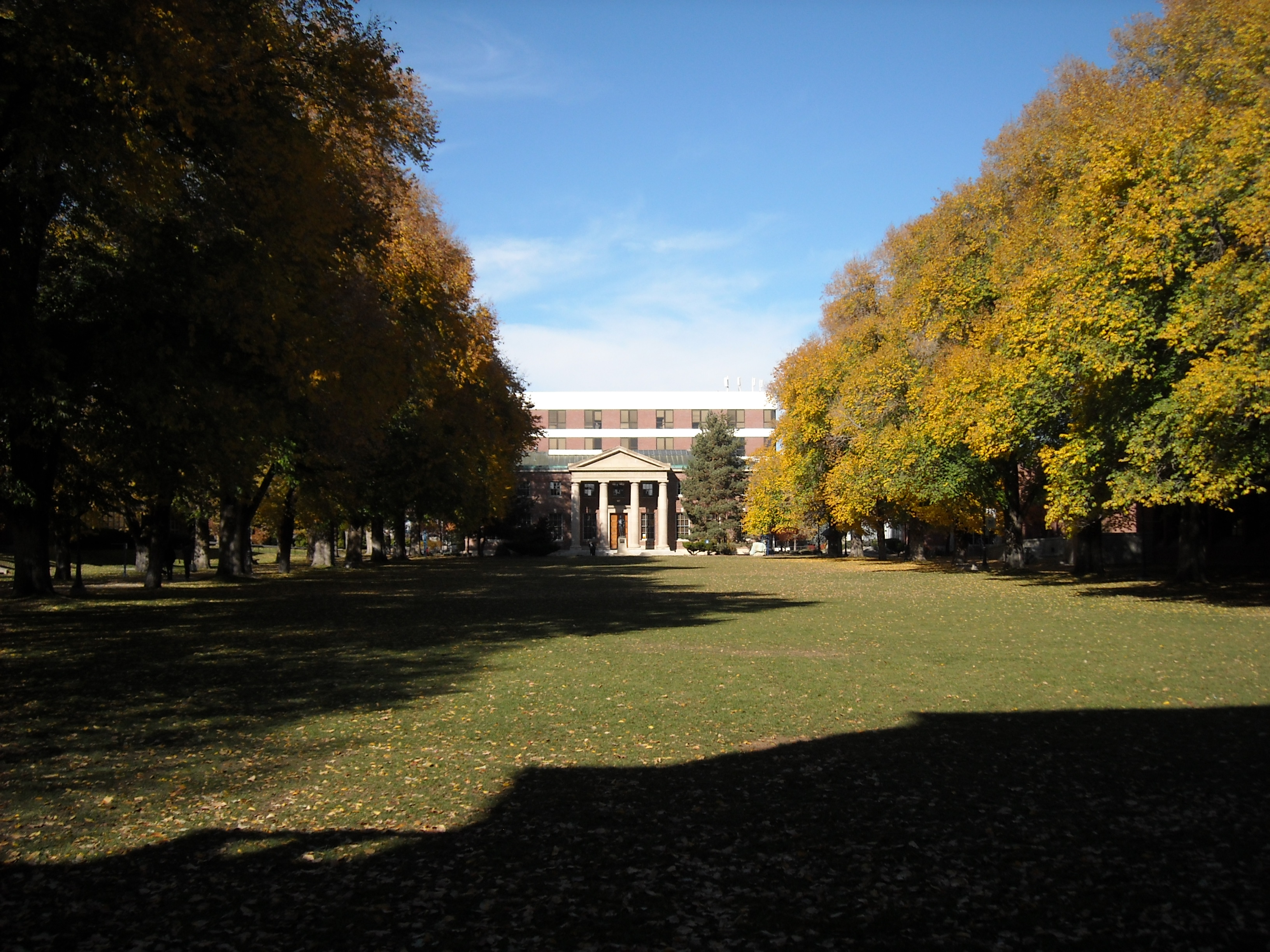
- University quadrangle

- Location within Nevada Location within the United States
- Location: Virginia St., Reno, Nevada, U.S.
- Coordinates: 39°32′18″N 119°48′50″W
- Area: 40 acres (16 ha)
- Built: 1906; 120 years ago
- Architect: White, Stanford; Et al.
- Architectural style: Late 19th and 20th Century Revivals, Second Empire, Jeffersonian Revival
- NRHP reference No.: 87000135
- Added to NRHP: February 25, 1987; 39 years ago

University of Nevada Reno Historic District on the campus of the University of Nevada, Reno is a 40-acre (16 ha) historic district that was listed on the National Register of Historic Places (NRHP) on February 25, 1987. It includes works by architects Stanford White and Frederick J. DeLongchamps. It includes 13 contributing buildings and two other contributing structures, including two separately NRHP-listed buildings, the Mackay School of Mines Building and Morrill Hall. The 13 historic buildings are:

- Morrill Hall (1886)
- Lincoln Hall (1896)
- Manzanita Hall (1896)
- Mackay School of Mines (1908)
- Jones Visitors Center (1914)
- Veterinary Building (1914)
- Peter Frandsen Humanities Building (1918)
- Thompson Student Services Center (1920)
- Physical Plant (1921)
- Clark Administration (1927)
- Mackay Science Hall (1930)
- Palmer Engineering Building (1941)
- Gymnasium (1945) (of "exceptional significance to the district")

and the two other contributing elements are

- University Quadrangle
- Manzanita Lake
