= Minden Inn =

- U.S. National Register of Historic Places
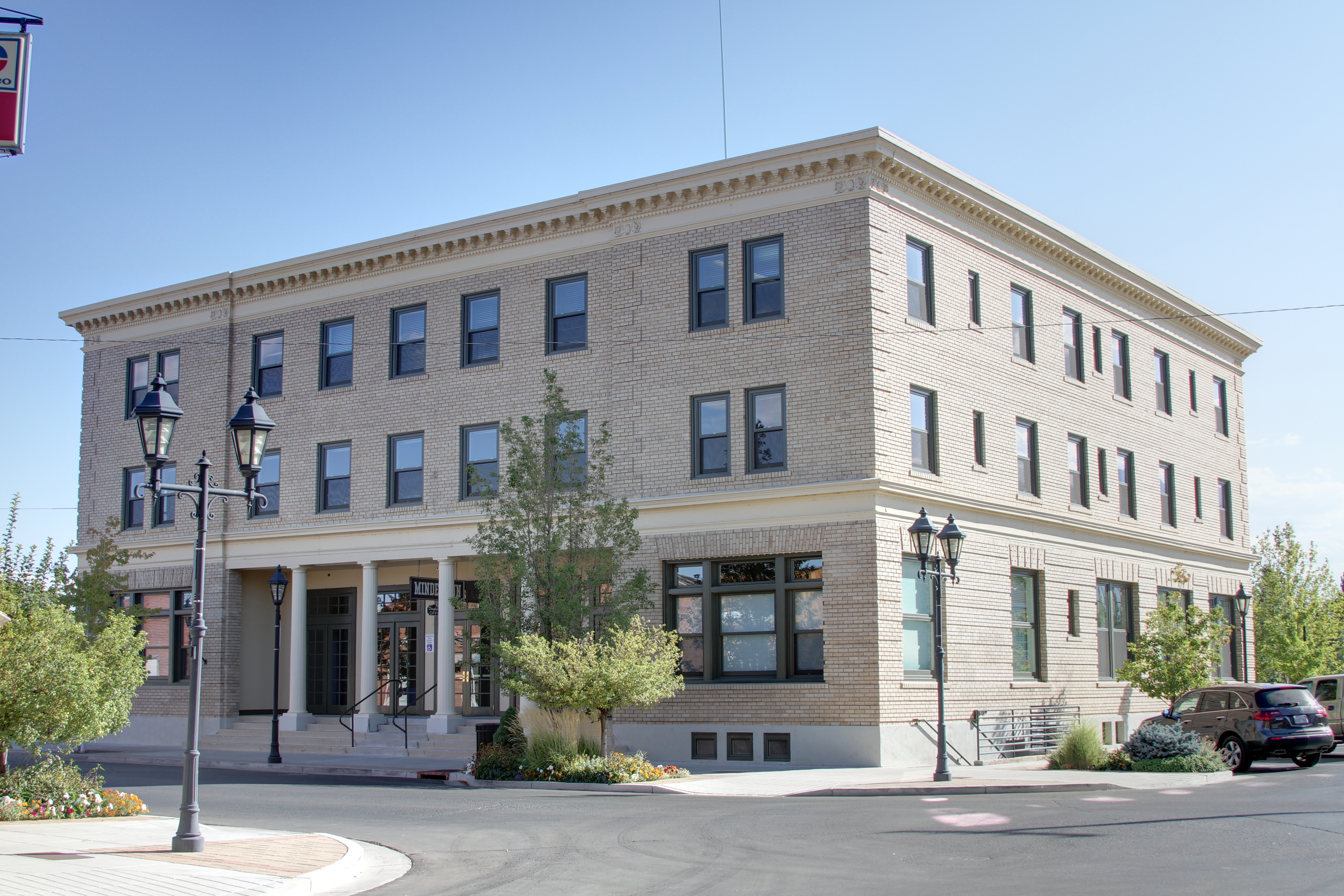

- Location within Nevada Location within the United States
- Location: 1594 Esmeralda Ave., Minden, Nevada
- Coordinates: 38°57′11″N 119°45′44″W
- Area: less than one acre
- Built: 1912–16
- Architect: DeLongchamps, Frederic J.
- Architectural style: Classical Revival
- MPS: Architecture of Frederick J. DeLongchamps TR
- NRHP reference No.: 86002262
- Added to NRHP: August 6, 1986

The Minden Inn is a historic hotel building located at 1594 Esmeralda Avenue in Minden, Nevada. Built from 1912 to 1916, the building was designed by prominent Nevada architect Frederic Joseph DeLongchamps in the Classical Revival style. The hotel was the largest commercial building in Minden and was operated by H. F. Dangberg, the founder of the town. The inn earned a reputation as "one of the finest small hotels on the West Coast" and was visited by a number of actors and celebrities who passed through Minden on the Virginia and Truckee Railroad. In addition, the hotel included a bar and gambling operations until 1987. The building now houses Douglas County offices.

The hotel was added to the National Register of Historic Places on August 6, 1986.
