= Mary Lee Nichols School =

- U.S. National Register of Historic Places
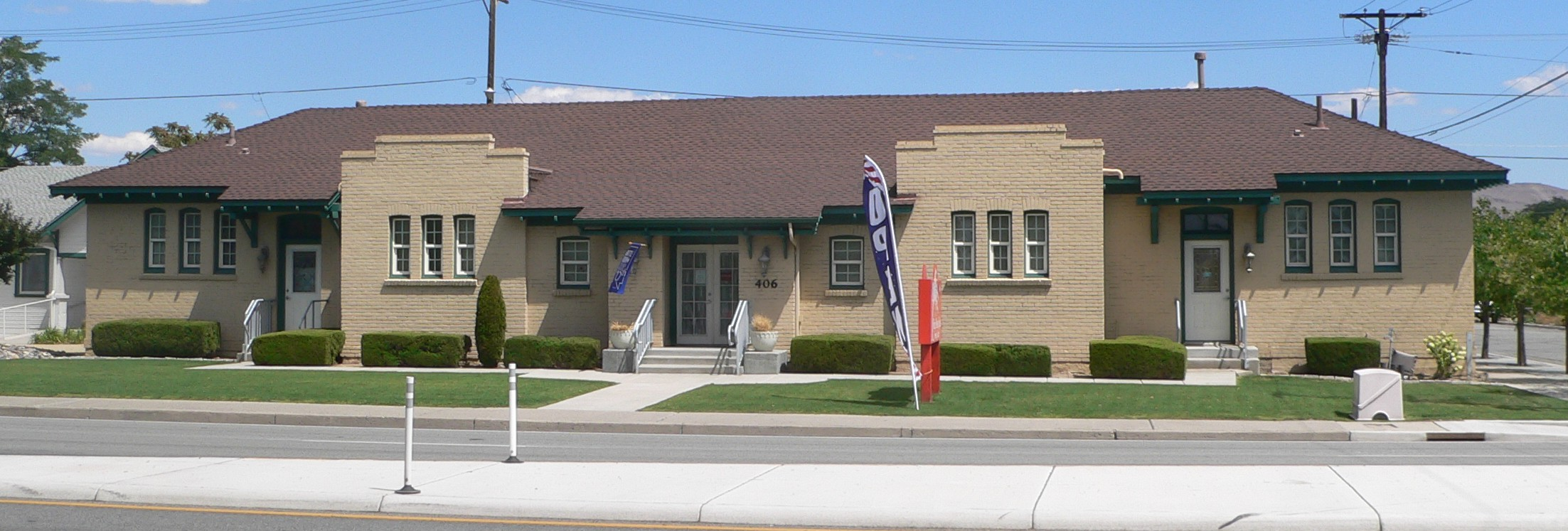
- View from the west, across Pyramid Way

- Location within Nevada Location within the United States
- Location: 400-406 Pyramid Way, Sparks, Nevada
- Coordinates: 39°32′13″N 119°45′09″W
- Area: 0.3 acres (0.12 ha)
- Built: 1917
- Built by: Bernasconi, U.
- Architect: DeLongchamps, F.
- Architectural style: Mission/spanish Revival
- NRHP reference No.: 02001277
- Added to NRHP: October 31, 2002

The Mary Lee Nichols School, located at 400-406 Pyramid Way in Sparks, Nevada, was built in 1917 and expanded in 1920 and 1927. It was designed by architect Frederick DeLongchamps and it was also a work of U. Bernasconi. DeLongchamps designed the 1920 and 1927 expansions as well. It includes Mission/spanish Revival architecture. It was listed on the National Register of Historic Places in 2002.

At the time of its NRHP listing, the school was in very good condition, with only very modest changes—including along its roofline—from the original appearance of the school. It was then being modified for use by Spark's Foster Grandparent program.
