= Washoe County Courthouse =

- U.S. National Register of Historic Places
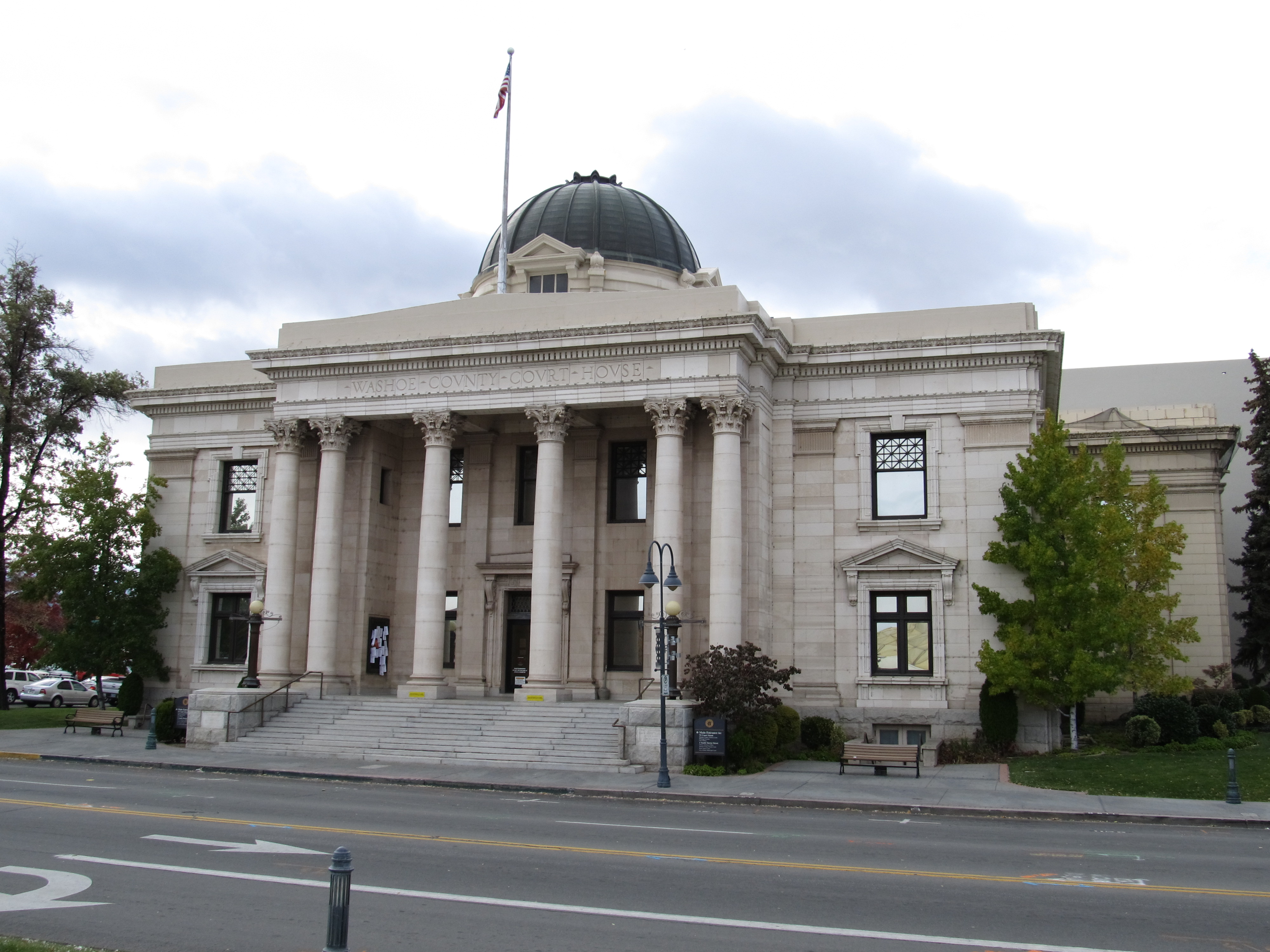
- Washoe County Courthouse, 2011

- Location within Nevada Location within the United States
- Interactive map showing the location of Washoe County Courthouse
- Location: 117 S. Virginia St., Reno, Nevada
- Coordinates: 39°31′25″N 119°48′24″W
- Area: less than one acre
- Built: 1910
- Built by: Sellman Bros.
- Architect: F. J. DeLongchamps
- Architectural style: Classical Revival
- MPS: Architecture of Frederick J. DeLongchamps TR
- NRHP reference No.: 86002254
- Added to NRHP: August 6, 1986

The Washoe County Courthouse, at 117 S. Virginia St. in Reno, Nevada, was built in 1910. It is significant for playing a role in the divorce industry in Nevada during the first half of the 20th century, when divorce was legal in Nevada and liberal residency requirements were enacted, while divorce was much more difficult elsewhere. In 1931, more than 4,800 divorces were processed in northern Nevada, most processed through this courthouse; it was economically important, with $5,000,000 being spent per year in Reno by divorcing parties.

The building is a replacement for a previous courthouse on the site, and was built for $250,000 during 1910–11. It is a Classical Revival work that was the first "solo" commission of Nevada architect Frederic J. DeLongchamps. The building is significant also for its long role in government in Reno. It was listed on the National Register of Historic Places (NRHP) in 1986.
