= Carson City Public Buildings =

- U.S. National Register of Historic Places
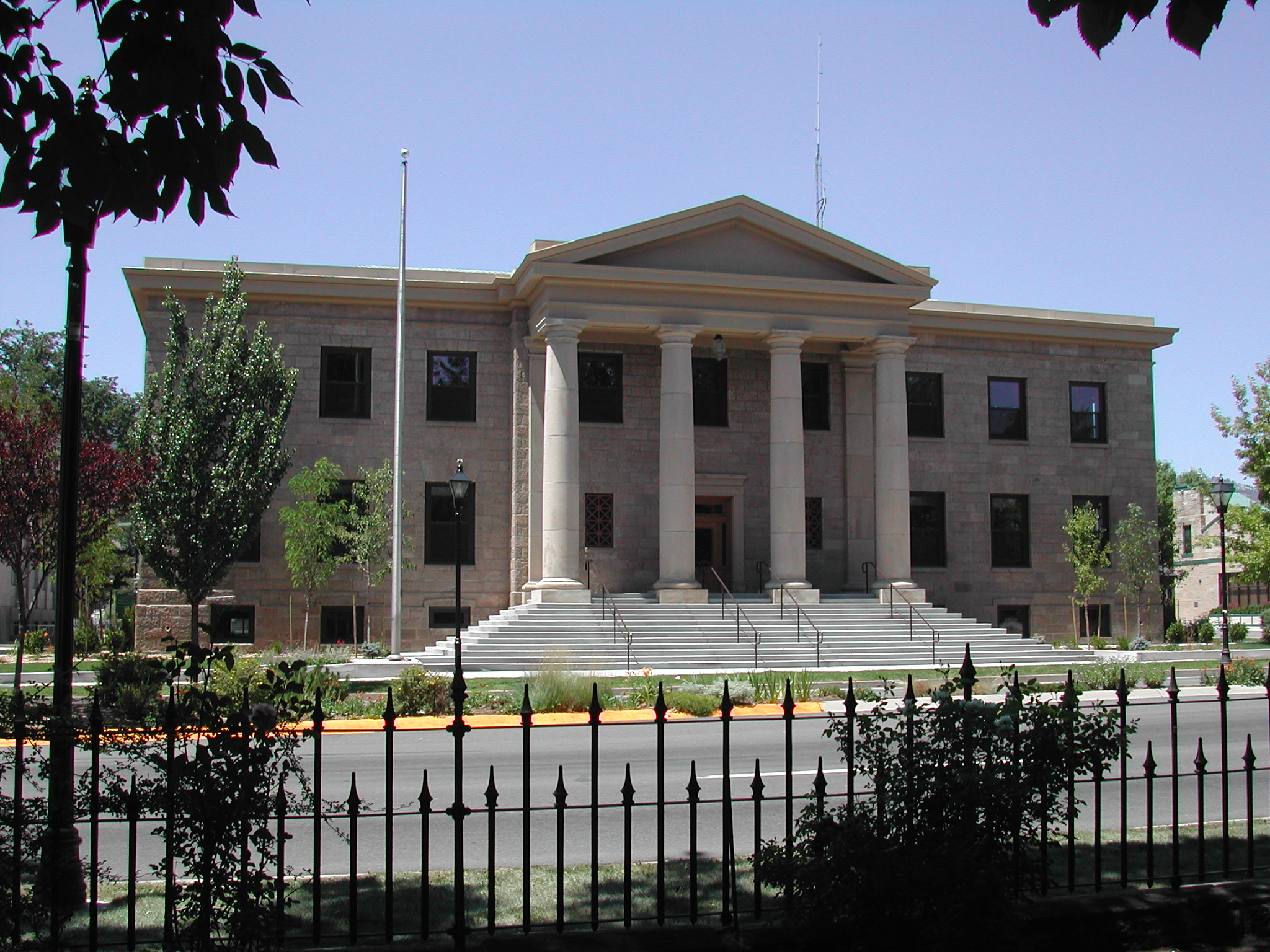
- Ormsby County Courthouse

- Location within Nevada Location within the United States
- Location: Carson St., Carson City, Nevada
- Coordinates: 39°9′49″N 119°46′41″W
- Area: less than one acre
- Built: 1920
- Architect: DeLongchamps, Frederick J.
- Architectural style: Classical Revival, Moderne, Neo-Classical
- MPS: Architecture of Frederick J. DeLongchamps TR
- NRHP reference No.: 87001625
- Added to NRHP: October 2, 1987

The Carson City Public Buildings, on Carson Street in Carson City, Nevada is a set of historic buildings dating back to 1920. There are three contributing buildings. The set was listed on the National Register of Historic Places in 1987. The three are the Nevada State Supreme Court Building, the Ormsby County Courthouse (of the former Ormsby County, Nevada which was dissolved in 1969), and the Heroes Memorial Building, designed by Nevada premier architect Frederick J. DeLongchamps.
