= Douglas County Courthouse (Nevada) =

- U.S. National Register of Historic Places
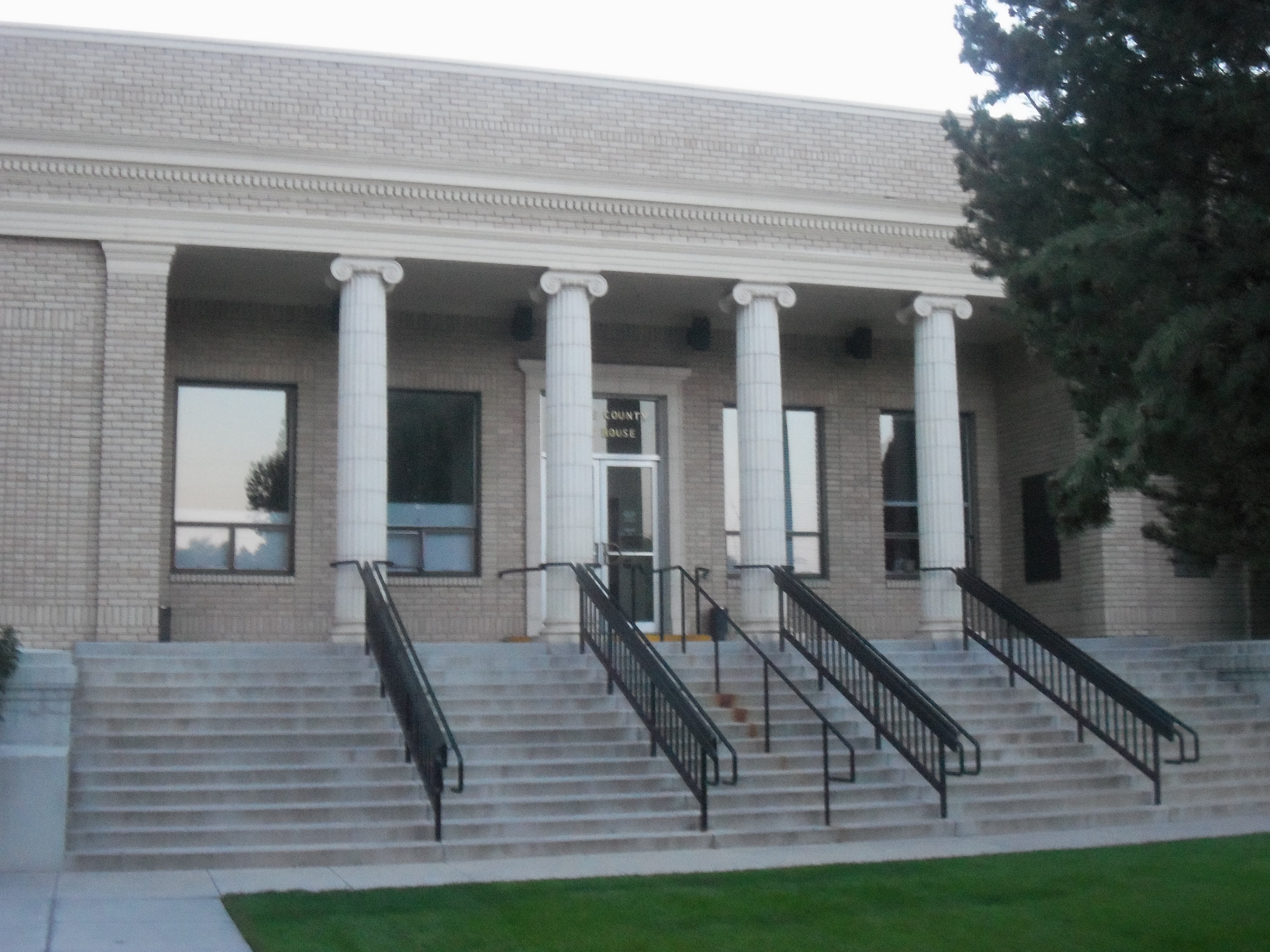

- Location within Nevada Location within the United States
- Interactive map showing the location of Douglas County Courthouse
- Location: Minden, Nevada
- Coordinates: 38°57′20″N 119°45′48″W
- Built: 1915
- Architect: Frederick J. DeLongchamps; Friedhoff & Hoeffel
- Architectural style: Classical Revival
- MPS: Architecture of Frederick J. DeLongchamps TR
- NRHP reference No.: 86002266
- Added to NRHP: August 6, 1986

Douglas County Courthouse is a historic courthouse at 1616 Eighth Street in Minden, Nevada, United States. When the county seat moved to Minden from Genoa in 1916, architects Frederick DeLongchamps and George L.F. O'Brien were paid $700 to design a new courthouse. The building was finished the same year by contractors Friedhoff and Hoeffel for $25,000.

== Current Day ==
The building currently houses several Douglas County, NV offices including Assessor, Clerk, Elections, Treasurer, and Recorder. It currently houses the Chambers for the Board of County Commissioners which regularly hosts public meetings related to county business.
