= McCarthy–Platt House =

Historic house in Nevada, United States

- U.S. National Register of Historic Places
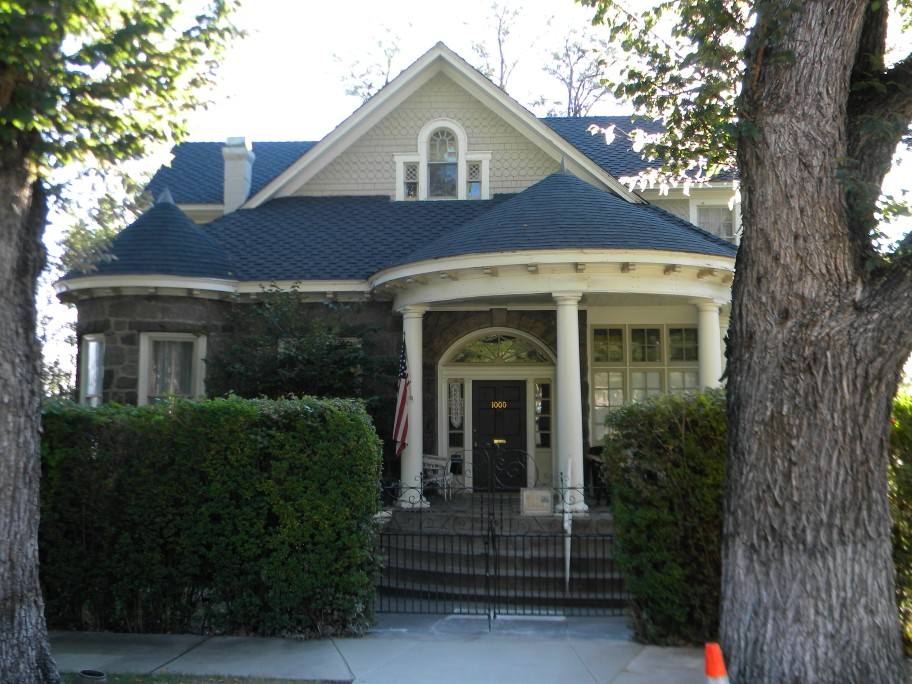

- Location within Nevada Location within the United States
- Location: 1000 Plumas St., Reno, Nevada
- Coordinates: 39°30′54″N 119°48′42″W
- Area: less than one acre
- Built: 1900; 1925
- Architect: DeLongchamps, Frederick J.
- Architectural style: Colonial Revival
- NRHP reference No.: 84002080
- Added to NRHP: May 31, 1984

The McCarthy–Platt House, at 1000 Plumas St. in Reno, Nevada, is a historic house that was originally built in 1900 and was redesigned in 1925 by architect Frederic J. DeLongchamps. It includes Colonial Revival architecture elements. It was listed on the National Register of Historic Places in 1984. It was deemed significant for association with its architect Frederic J. DeLongchamps, for its associations with Reno developer Charles McCarthy and Nevada attorney/politician Samuel Platt, and "as a noteworthy example" of Colonial Revival architecture in Nevada.
