= Minden Butter Manufacturing Company =

- U.S. National Register of Historic Places
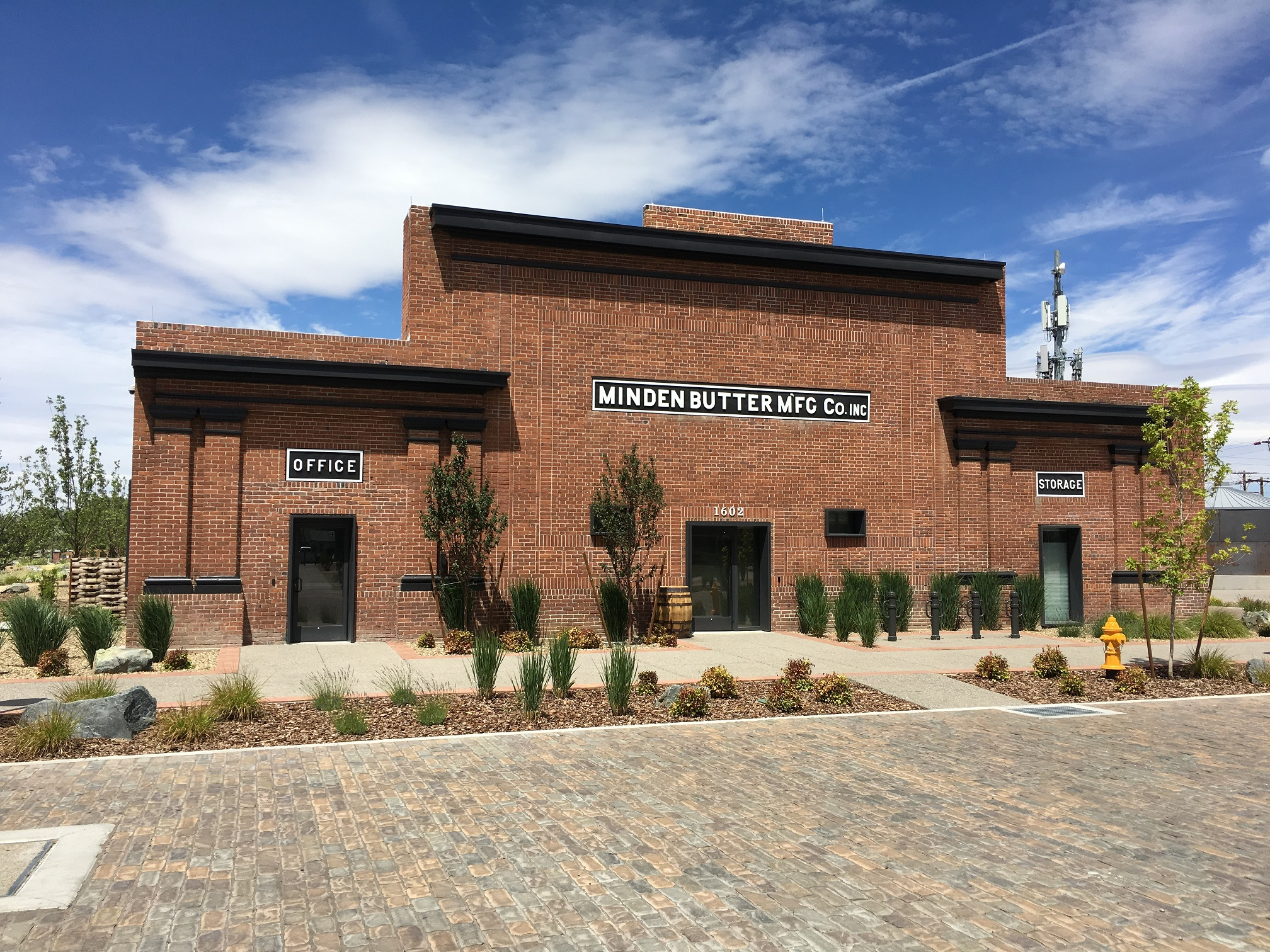

- Location within Nevada Location within the United States
- Location: 1617 Water St. Minden, Nevada
- Coordinates: 38°57′20″N 119°45′48″W
- Area: less than one acre
- Built: 1916
- Architect: DeLongchamps, Frederic J.
- Architectural style: Utilitarian
- MPS: Architecture of Frederick J. DeLongchamps TR
- NRHP reference No.: 86002263
- Added to NRHP: August 6, 1986

The Minden Butter Manufacturing Company, also known as the Minden Creamery, is a historic creamery building located at 1617 Water St. in Minden, Nevada. Built in 1916, the creamery was designed by noted Nevada architect Frederic Joseph DeLongchamps. The creamery replaced the Minden Butter Manufacturing Company's first building, which was built in 1908, so the company would have space to pasteurize its products. The company sold butter and other produce under the Windmill brand name and eventually became the largest creamery in Nevada. While the company mainly shipped its goods to the San Francisco area, it also sold internationally; the year before the creamery was built, it sent a large shipment of butter to China. The creamery building is now used by Bently Nevada for manufacturing purposes.

The creamery was added to the National Register of Historic Places on August 6, 1986.
