= Thunderbird Lodge (Lake Tahoe, Nevada) =

Historic house in Nevada, United States

- Whittell Estate
- U.S. National Register of Historic Places
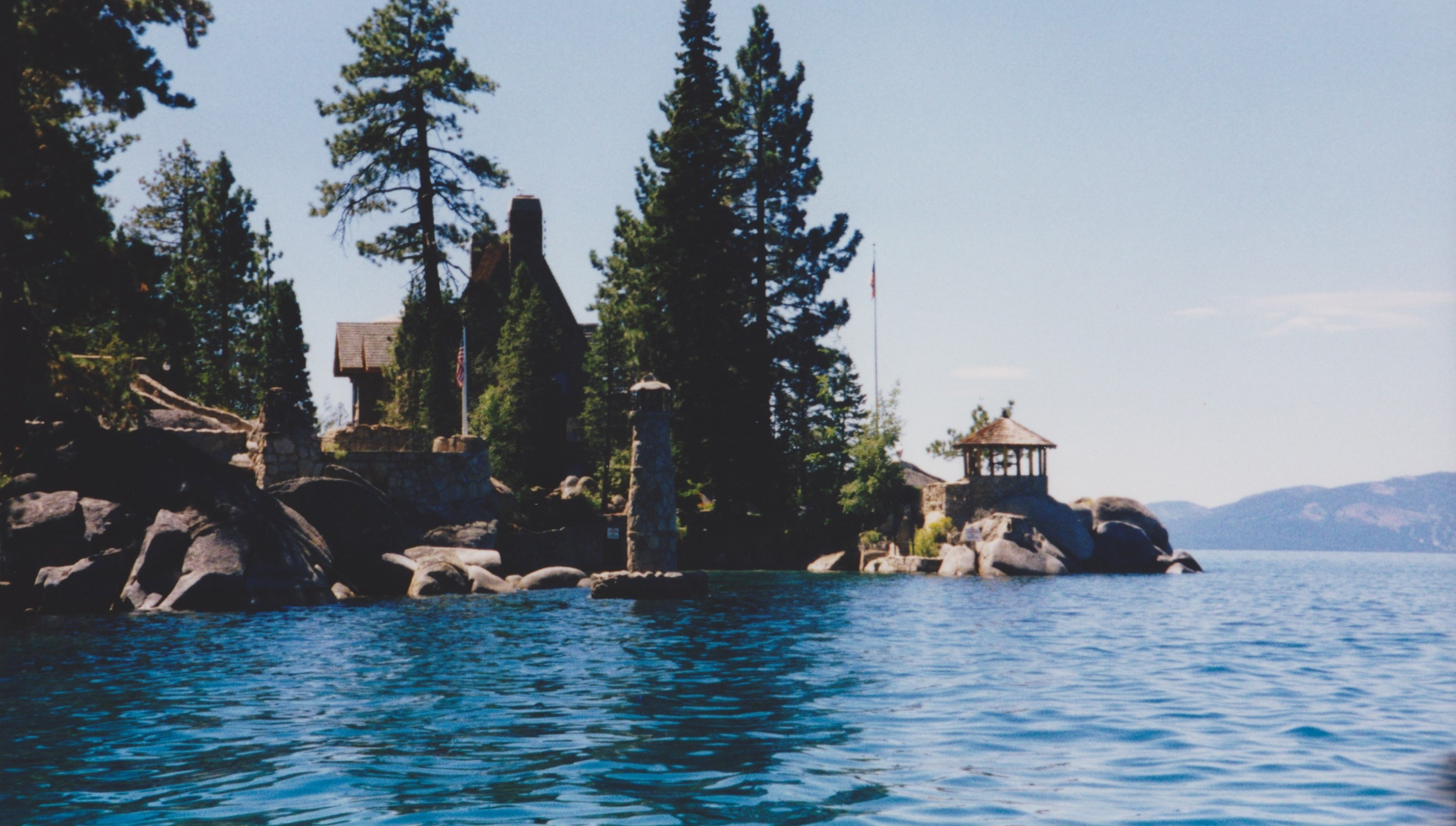

- Location within Nevada Location within the United States
- Location: 5000 State Route 28
- Nearest city: Incline Village, Nevada
- Coordinates: 39°10′25″N 119°55′10″W
- Area: 6.51 acres (2.63 ha)
- Architect: Frederick DeLongchamps
- Architectural style: Rustic, Late 19th and 20th Century Revivals
- NRHP reference No.: 00001207

The Thunderbird Lodge, also known as the Whittell Estate, is a historic 6.51-acre (2.63 ha) waterfront estate located on the east shore of Lake Tahoe, in western Washoe County, Nevada.

== History ==
George Whittell Jr. was born in San Francisco in 1881, an heir to one of San Francisco's wealthiest families. His father was the founder of PG&E, the Northern California utility corporation, along with many other businesses. Upon his father's death in 1922, he received an inheritance of $29 million, which he invested in the stock market. It had grown to $50 million (Roughly $700 million in 2015 dollars) when he liquidated all his stock holdings just weeks prior to the 1929 Stock Market Crash, becoming one of California's richest people then at age 49. Captain Whittell, as he liked to be called, despite having no military service, is quoted as saying: "When men stop boozing, womanizing and gambling, the bloom is off the rose." By establishing a residence in Nevada, Whittell avoided the higher income taxes in California, where he spent the bulk of each year at his 50-acre Woodside, California estate, the present day site of Kings Mountain Vineyard.

In 1935, George Whittell Jr. purchased the 27 miles of Lake Tahoe shoreline and nearly 40,000 acres from Norman Biltz. It encompassed essentially 95% of the Nevada shoreline of Lake Tahoe — all of the land from Crystal Bay, Incline Village, Sand Harbor, Glenbrook, Cave Rock, and Zephyr Cove to Round Hill. Whittell paid approximately $2.7 million or $81.00 per acre. Between 1935 and 1969, Whittell continued to amass a vast majority of the acreage in Washoe, Carson, and Douglas Counties on the Nevada side of Lake Tahoe.

=== Buildings ===
In 1936 construction began the summer residence, Thunderbird Lodge, designed in the Rustic style by Frederic DeLongchamps for George Whittell Jr. The stone house was completed 2½ years later. The estate includes numerous small buildings, before 1937 designed by Frederic DeLongchamps, and after by the design firm DeLongchamps and O'Brien. The house had no guest rooms, as Whittell wanted no overnight visitors.

In addition to the main house, there is a Card House, Caretaker's Cottage, Cook/Butler's House, Admiral's House, Boathouse with adjoining 600 feet (180 m) tunnel, Gatehouse, and the "Elephant House"—home to Mingo, Whittell's two ton Indian Elephant. The large boathouse housed his custom 55-foot (17 m) mahogany and stainless steel yacht, the Thunderbird.

As the years passed, Whittell grew more reclusive, gradually abandoning his casino development plans for Sand Harbor in favor of maintaining his own secluded hideaway and lifestyle. He entertained only a few people at Thunderbird Lodge, including his neighbors Ty Cobb and Howard Hughes, for the occasional all night card games.

Whittell's dislike for unwanted visitors and curiosity-seekers is reflected by a loud siren that operated at Thunderbird Lodge's dock, that he used to frighten them away. He sold his yacht, the Thunderbird, to casino magnate Bill Harrah in 1962. After a succession of owners, it is again housed in the Lodge's boathouse.

=== Land ===
Whittell eventually owned almost 40,000 acres (16,000 ha) of the Nevada shoreline area on eastern Lake Tahoe. He had originally planned to develop the land into "high-class" summer properties, a ski resort, and a $1 million hotel-casino. He later decided that he "liked not having neighbors." In addition, development became more complicated, and involved environmental protection pressures and the state of Nevada pressing with eminent domain claims for much of the land to create a state park.

During the 1950s, the State of Nevada began negotiations with Whittell to purchase land for a state park. His refusal to pursue development on the 27 miles of shoreline he owned was more from his need for privacy and seclusion rather than intentional conservation. Nonetheless, Whittell is credited for the natural and unspoiled beauty of Lake Tahoe's present day eastern shoreline.

=== Later years ===
In 1954 Whittell broke his leg, and remained at his Woodside, California estate until 1957. After Whittell broke his hip late in life he refused surgery to repair the fracture, and began using a wheelchair.

George Whittell Jr. died of melanoma on 18 April 1969, with his third wife Elia by his side.

After Whittell's death, Thunderbird Lodge and the adjacent 10,000 acres of property were purchased by Jack Dreyfus of Dreyfus Investments. Dreyfus later sold most of the land, excluding the residence, to the U.S. Forest Service—Humboldt-Toiyabe National Forest and Nevada State Parks—Lake Tahoe – Nevada State Park.

== Residence conservation ==
In 1998 the developer Del Webb Corporation purchased the Thunderbird Lodge and its remaining 140 acres of private land. In 1999, the American Land Conservancy facilitated a three way land exchange. The U.S. Bureau of Land Management conveyed to Del Webb nearly 4,000 acres of Clark County, Nevada land near Las Vegas and the U.S. Forest Service received the 140 acres of Lake Tahoe land without the residence compound. The Thunderbird Lodge buildings were conveyed to the non-profit Thunderbird Preservation Society with a $9.8-million debt payable to Del Webb/Pulte Homes. In 2009 the Society acquired title to the buildings.

Thunderbird Lodge is currently owned by the non-profit Thunderbird Preservation Society. It is now a popular tourist attraction, with public tours by reservation.

== See also ==
- Vikingsholm
- Houses on the National Register of Historic Places in Nevada
