= Reno National Bank-First Interstate Bank =

- U.S. National Register of Historic Places
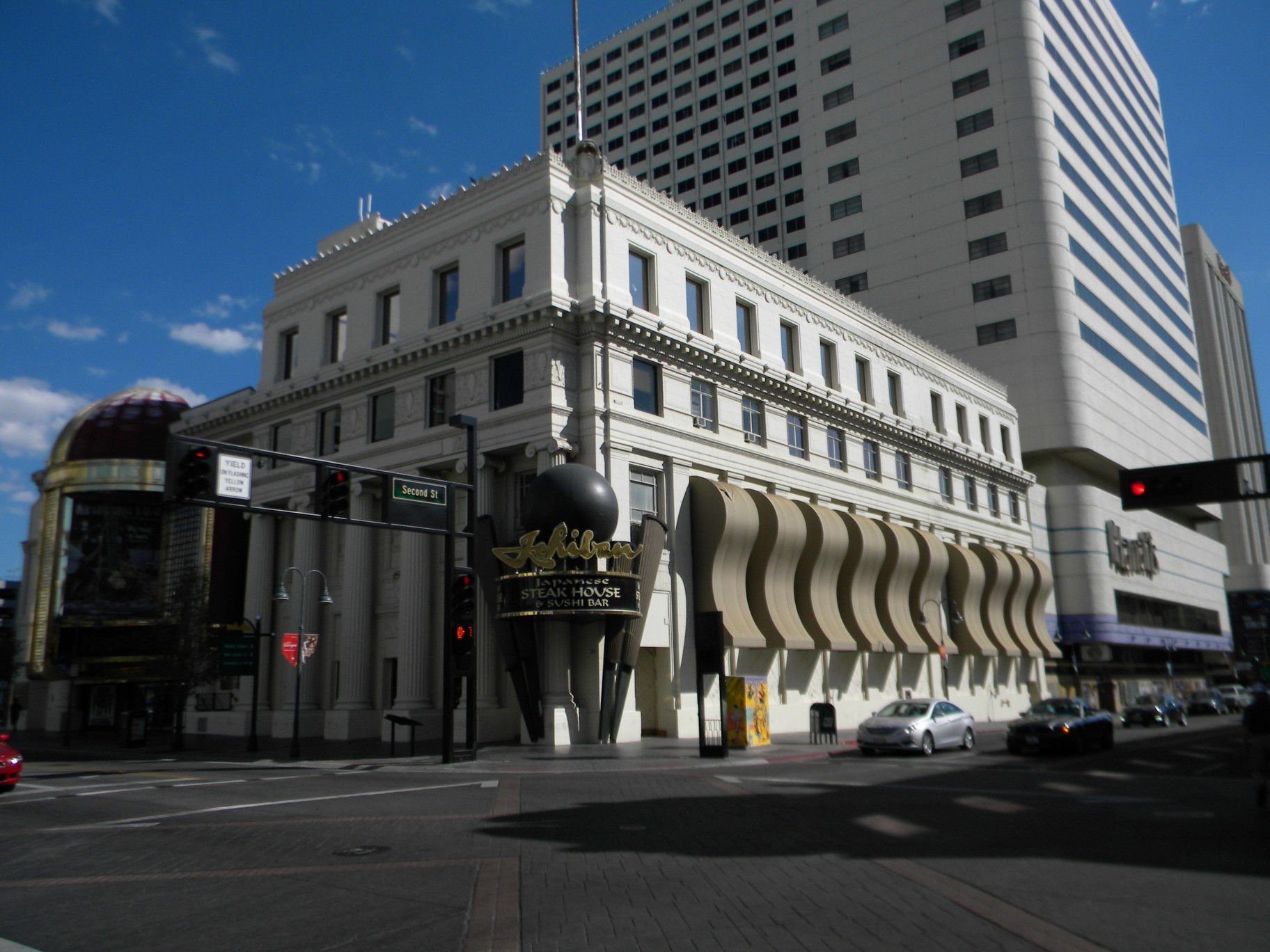

- Location within Nevada Location within the United States
- Location: 204 N. Virginia St., Reno, Nevada
- Coordinates: 39°31′30″N 119°48′20″W
- Area: less than one acre
- Built: 1915
- Architect: DeLongchamps, Frederick J.
- Architectural style: Classical Revival
- MPS: Architecture of Frederick J. DeLongchamps TR
- NRHP reference No.: 86002257
- Added to NRHP: August 6, 1986

The Reno National Bank-First Interstate Bank, at 204 N. Virginia St. in Reno, Nevada, is a Classical Revival building that was built in 1915.

== History ==
It was designed by architect Frederick J. DeLongchamps. It was listed on the National Register of Historic Places in 1986. It was listed as part of a Thematic Resources study of the architecture of DeLongchamps.

The former bank has been transformed to hold restaurant space in the Harrah's Reno casino resort.
