= Joseph Giraud House =

Historic house in Nevada, United States

- U.S. National Register of Historic Places
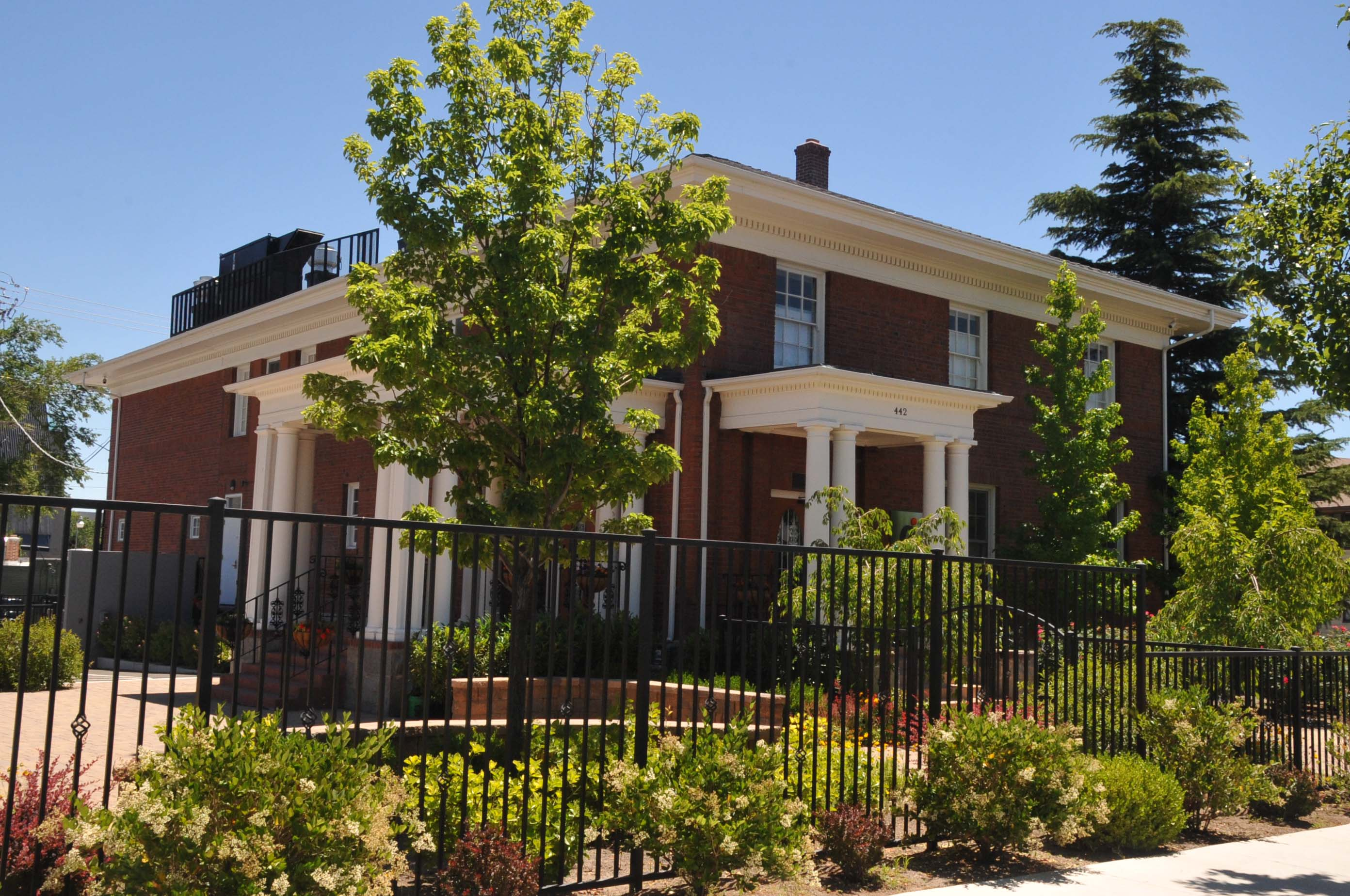

- Location within Nevada Location within the United States
- Location: 442 Flint St., Reno, Nevada
- Coordinates: 39°31′13″N 119°48′49″W
- Area: 0.4 acres (0.16 ha)
- Built: 1914
- Architect: DeLongchamps, Frederick Joseph
- Architectural style: Colonial Revival
- NRHP reference No.: 84002079
- Added to NRHP: April 5, 1984

The Joseph Giraud House, at 442 Flint St. in Reno, Nevada, United States, is a historic house that was designed by prominent Nevada architect Frederick DeLongchamps and was built in 1914. Also known as the Hardy House, it was listed on the National Register of Historic Places in 1984.

It was deemed significant for its architecture and for its association with sheeprancher Joseph Giraud and businessman Roy Hardy.
