= Fallon City Hall =

- U.S. National Register of Historic Places
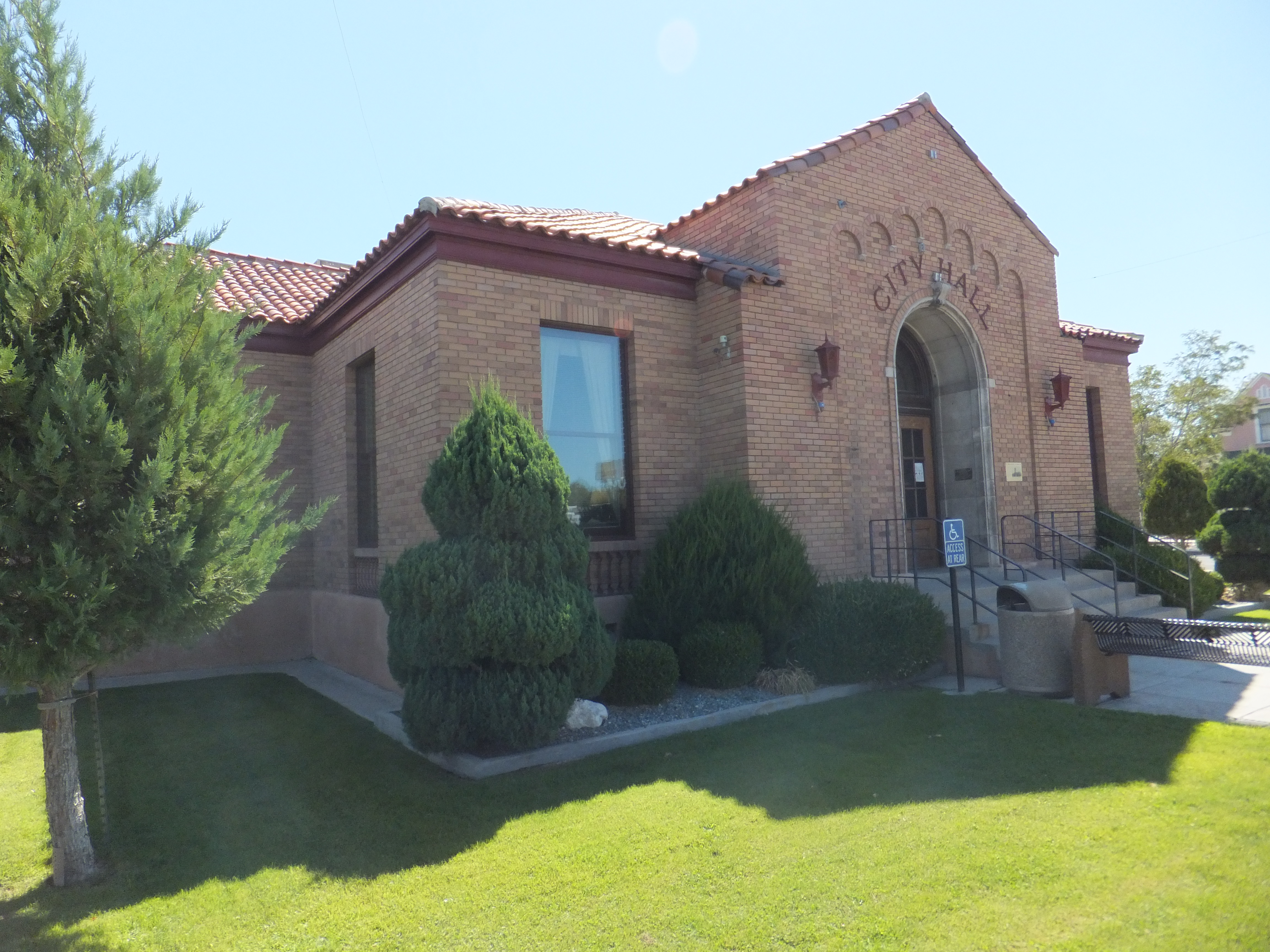
- Photo in 2012

- Location within Nevada Location within the United States
- Location: 55 E. Williams Ave., Fallon, Nevada
- Coordinates: 39°28′28″N 118°46′36″W
- Area: 0.7 acres (0.28 ha)
- Built: 1930-31
- Built by: Ernest Gevelhoff and T.J. Rees
- Architect: DeLongchamps, Frederick
- Architectural style: Mission/Spanish Revival
- NRHP reference No.: 04001197
- Added to NRHP: October 27, 2004

The Fallon City Hall, at 55 E. Williams Ave. in Fallon, Nevada, was built between 1930 and 1931. It was designed by architect Frederick DeLongchamps in Mission/Spanish Revival style. It is a 14,000 square foot one-story building built over a high basement.

It was listed on the National Register of Historic Places in 2004. It was deemed significant for its association with local politics and government, and "as a rare example of the Spanish Colonial Revival style in Fallon and as a work of a master, pre-eminent architect Frederick DeLongchamps." At the time of its NRHP listing it had continuously served as city hall since 1931.
