= Reno Main Post Office =

- U.S. Post Office-Reno Main
- U.S. National Register of Historic Places
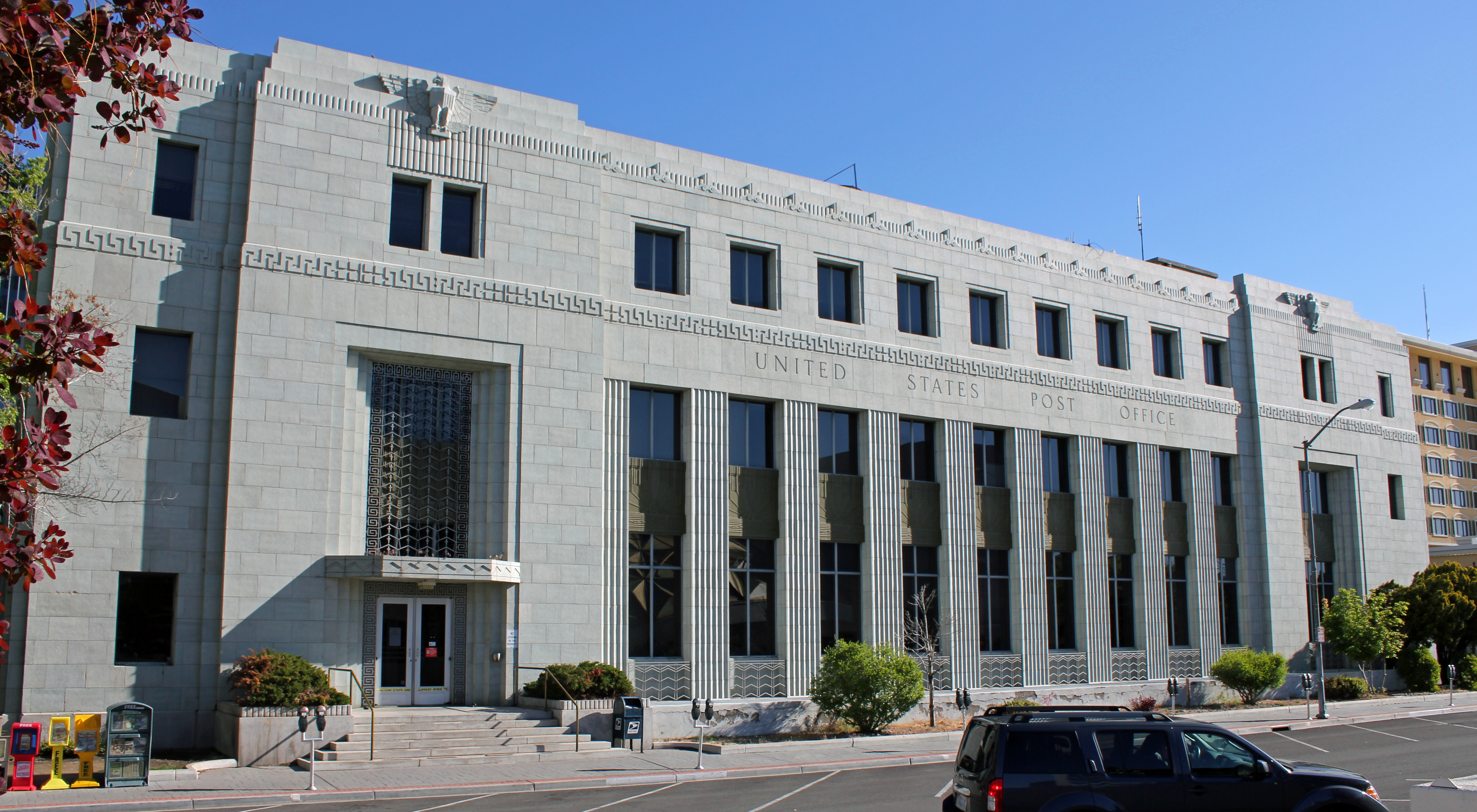

- Location within Nevada Location within the United States
- Location: 50 S. Virginia St., Reno, Nevada
- Coordinates: 39°31′29″N 119°48′39″W
- Area: 1.2 acres (0.49 ha)
- Built: 1933
- Built by: MacDonald Engineering Co.
- Architect: DeLongchamps, Frederick J.
- Architectural style: Art Deco
- MPS: US Post Offices in Nevada MPS
- NRHP reference No.: 90000135
- Added to NRHP: February 28, 1990

The former Reno Main Post Office, located at 50 S. Virginia St. in Reno, Nevada, was built in 1933. The post office was designed by noted Nevada architect Frederic J. DeLongchamps and was built by the MacDonald Engineering Co., of Chicago, at cost of $363,660. This building was listed on the National Register of Historic Places in 1990. as U.S. Post Office-Reno Main.

This building was deemed "an outstanding example of a combined post office and federal office building for a medium-sized city." According to its 1990 NRHP nomination this is the sole post office built by the U.S. government in Nevada that has Art Deco/Moderne styling, but it is overall "Starved Classical" in style.

In 1986, a lowered ceiling and improved lighting led to gains in the energy efficiency of the building, as well as improvements in the efficiency of mail sorting.

In 2012, the Reno Main Post Office building was sold to a local developer, 50 South Virginia LLC, and repurposed as a mixed used building with retail, restaurant, and business office space. In 2015 the underground level was renovated and named “The Basement”, a collection of eateries and retail shops. In 2016, retailer West Elm opened their first Reno location on the first floor. However, West Elm closed this location in 2022.

The current main Reno Post Office is now located on Vassar Street.
