= Minden Wool Warehouse =

- U.S. National Register of Historic Places
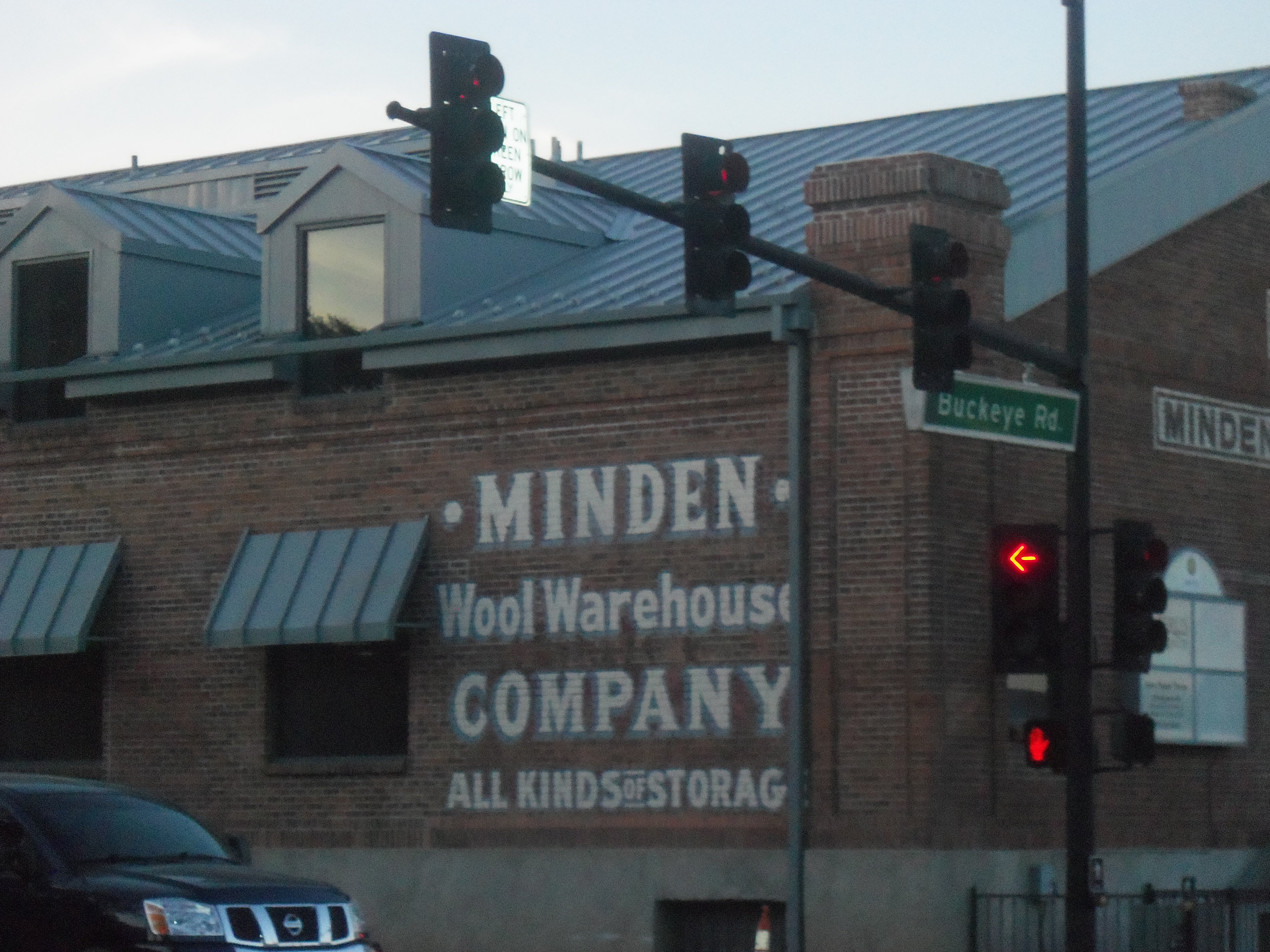

- Location within Nevada Location within the United States
- Location: 1615 Railroad Ave., Minden, Nevada
- Coordinates: 38°57′19″N 119°45′51″W
- Area: less than one acre
- Built: 1915
- Architect: DeLongchamps, Frederic J.
- Architectural style: Utilitarian
- MPS: Architecture of Frederick J. DeLongchamps TR
- NRHP reference No.: 86002261
- Added to NRHP: August 6, 1986

The Minden Wool Warehouse is a historic building at 1615 Railroad Avenue in Minden, Nevada. Built in 1915, it was designed by prominent Nevada architect Frederic Joseph DeLongchamps for Minden founder H. F. Dangberg, as the headquarters of the Dangberg Land and Livestock Company. Carson Valley farmers stored wool and potatoes there to be shipped out of Minden. It was later rented to the Minden Flour Company and a local creamery. It is now an office building for the Bently Nevada Corporation.

It was added to the National Register of Historic Places on August 6, 1986.
