= Oats Park Grammar School =

- U.S. National Register of Historic Places
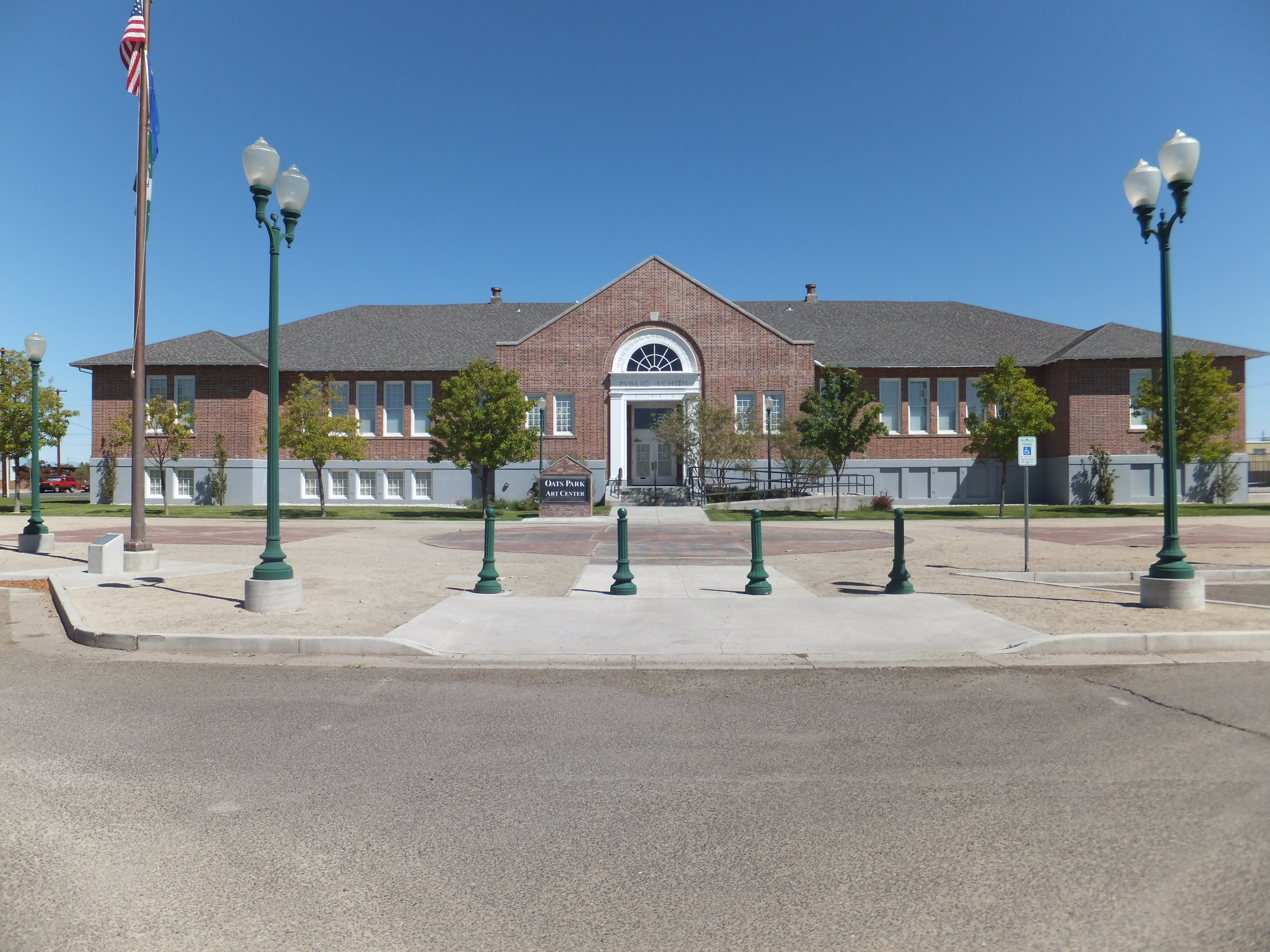

- Location within Nevada Location within the United States
- Location: 167 E. Park St., Fallon, Nevada
- Coordinates: 39°28′25″N 118°46′07″W
- Area: less than one acre
- Built: 1915; 1921
- Architect: DeLongchamps, Frederick J.
- NRHP reference No.: 90000715
- Added to NRHP: May 2, 1990

The Oats Park Grammar School, at 167 E. Park St. in Fallon, Nevada, is a historic school built in 1914. It was listed on the National Register of Historic Places in 1990.

It was designed in 1914 by noted Nevada architect Frederick J. DeLongchamps, who in 1920 designed an addition as well; the school and addition were built in 1915 and 1921. It was deemed significant for its association with education in the state and for association with DeLongchamps.

It has also been known as Oats Park School and as Fallon Grammar School.
