= Douglass-Frey Ranch =

- U.S. National Register of Historic Places
- U.S. Historic district
- Location within Nevada Location within the United States
- Location: 1075 Dodge Ln., vicinity of Fallon, Nevada
- Coordinates: 39°22′34″N 118°45′18″W
- MPS: Architecture of Frederick J. DeLongchamps
- NRHP reference No.: 15000796
- Added to NRHP: November 17, 2015

The Douglass-Frey Ranch in Churchill County, Nevada was listed on the National Register of Historic Places in 2015.

The main feature of the property is the Douglass Mansion, built during 1918–1920, which is a rare Prairie School work by architect Frederick J. DeLongchamps.

A bunk house built in 1916 is also included. It is a two-story, stucco house with a low-pitch hipped roof.

Barns and sheds from c.1920 are also included, as well as a pavilion built in 1995.
