= I.O.O.F. Building, Mason Valley =

- U.S. National Register of Historic Places
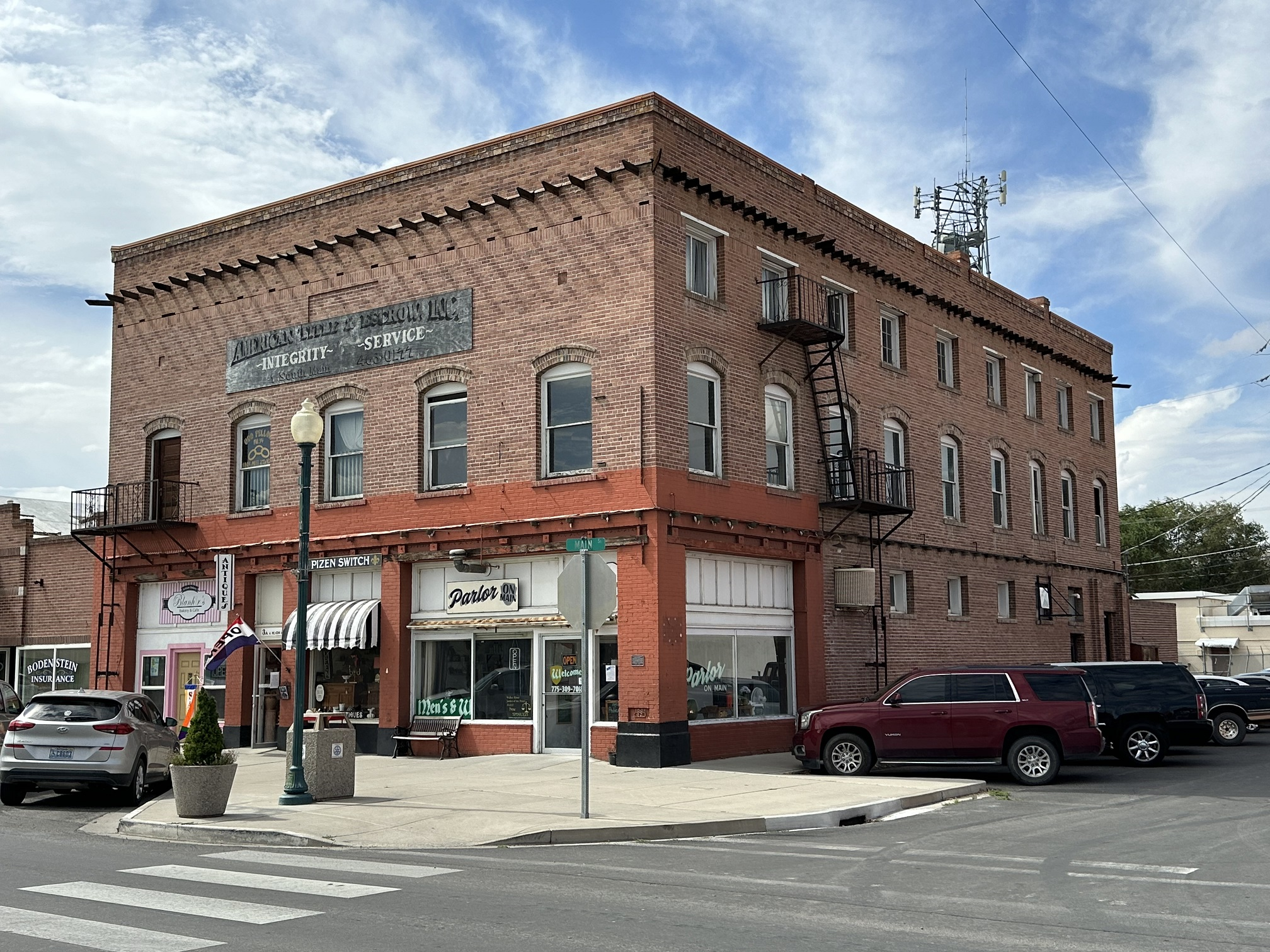
- I.O.O.F Building in 2024

- Location within Nevada Location within the United States
- Location: 1 S. Main St. Yerington, Nevada
- Coordinates: 38°59′2″N 119°10′11″W
- Area: less than one acre
- Built: 1913-14
- Architect: Frederick J. DeLongchamps
- NRHP reference No.: 83001111
- Added to NRHP: August 4, 1983

The I.O.O.F. Building, Mason Valley, located at 1 S. Main St. in Yerington, Nevada, is a building designed by prominent Nevada architect Frederick J. DeLongchamps that was built in 1913–14. It was listed on the National Register of Historic Places in 1983.

It was deemed significant for its association with the community development of Yerington, in which the International Order of Odd Fellows group played a role, and for being designed by DeLongchamps.
