= Vachina Apartments-California Apartments =

- U.S. National Register of Historic Places
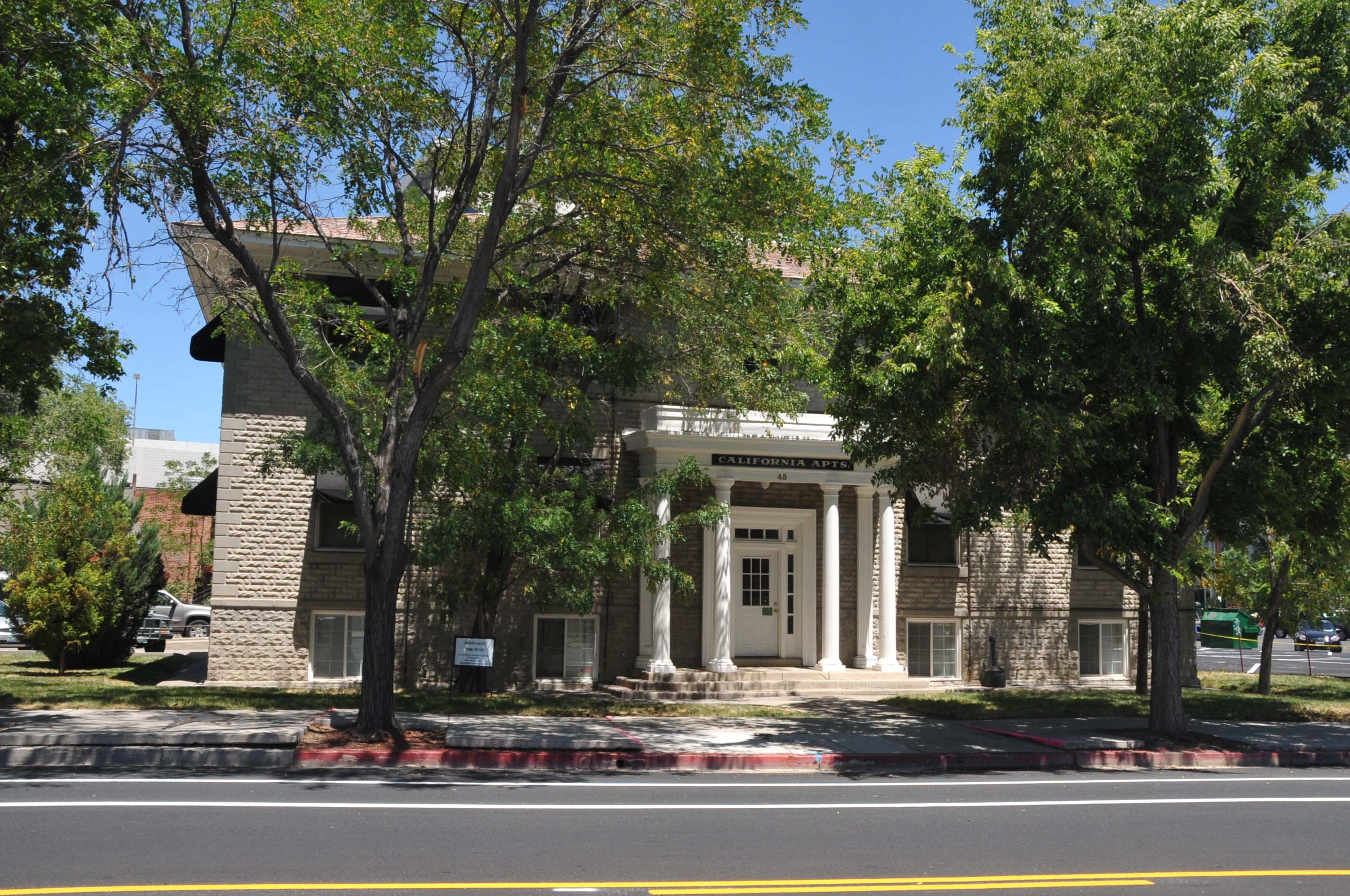

- Location within Nevada Location within the United States
- Location: 45 California Ave., Reno, Nevada
- Coordinates: 39°31′30″N 119°48′20″W
- Area: less than one acre
- Built: 1922
- Architect: DeLongchamps, Frederick J.
- Architectural style: Classical Revival
- MPS: Architecture of Frederick J. DeLongchamps TR
- NRHP reference No.: 86002258
- Added to NRHP: August 6, 1986

The Vachina Apartments-California Apartments, at 45 California Ave. in Reno, Nevada, is a historic Classical Revival work of architect Frederick J. DeLongchamps. It was built in 1922. It was listed on the National Register of Historic Places in 1986.
