= Douglas County High School (Nevada) =

- U.S. National Register of Historic Places
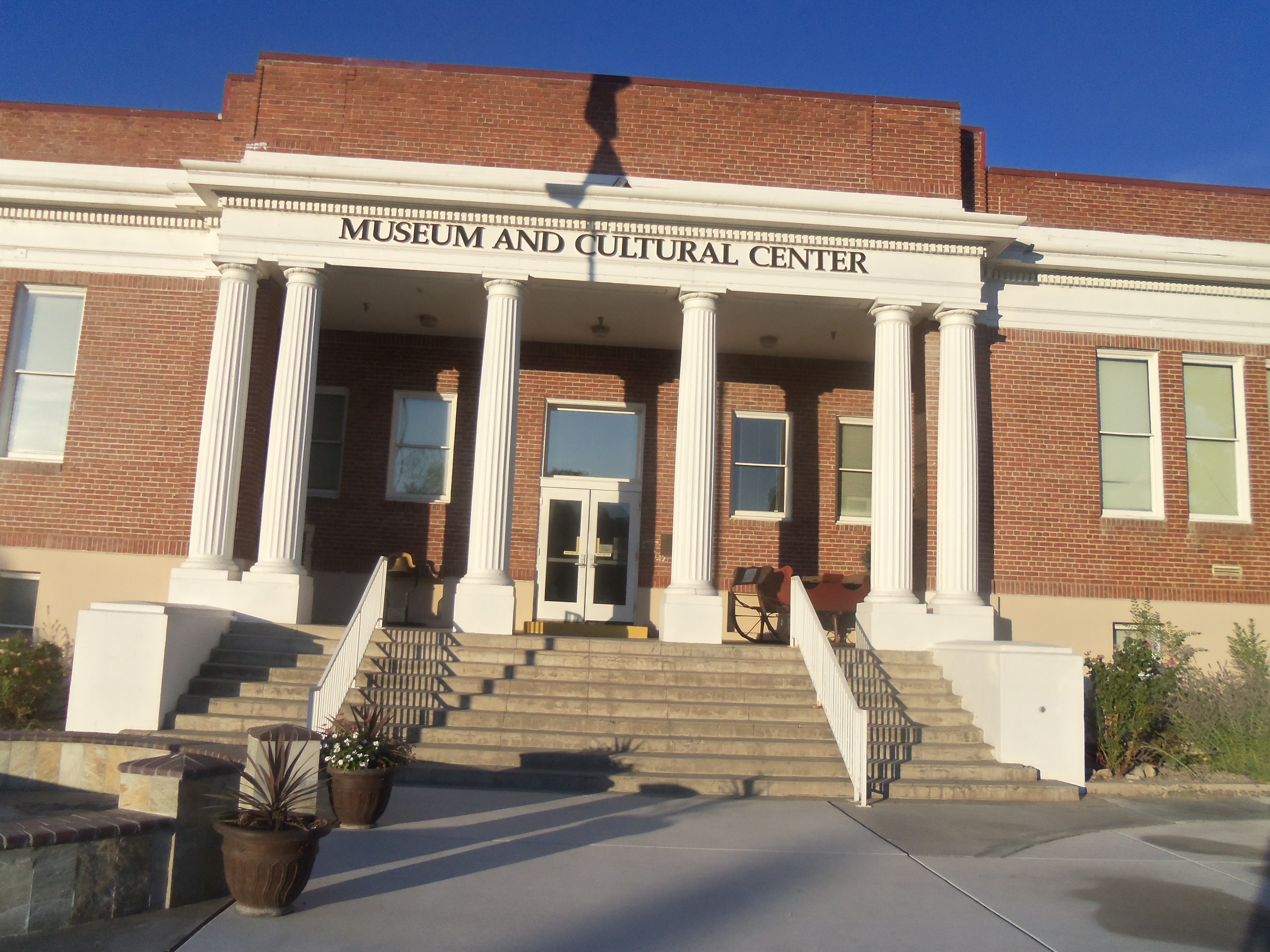

- Location within Nevada Location within the United States
- Location: 1670 Hwy 88; Gardnerville, Nevada
- Coordinates: 38°56′41″N 119°45′06″W
- Built: 1915
- Architect: Frederic Joseph DeLongchamps
- Architectural style: Classical Revival
- NRHP reference No.: 92000117
- Added to NRHP: March 9, 1992

Douglas County High School was the high school serving Douglas County, Nevada from 1915 to the mid-1950s when it became a middle school. In 1988, the building was retired from educational uses. Designed by prolific Nevada architect Frederic Joseph DeLongchamps, it serves today as both the Carson Valley Museum & Cultural Center and a middle school and is listed on the United States National Register of Historic Places.

== Carson Valley Museum & Cultural Center ==
The Carson Valley Museum & Cultural Center is operated by the Douglas County Historical Society. The museum's displays include a "Main Street" exhibit with period businesses such as a mercantile, dry goods and drug store, doctor's office, barbershop and newspaper office. Other exhibits include area Basque immigrants, Native Americans, Nevada's wild and free-roaming mustangs.

== Douglas High School ==
The high school moved to Minden. It is known as Douglas High School and is still in operation today.
