= Yerington Grammar School =

- U.S. National Register of Historic Places
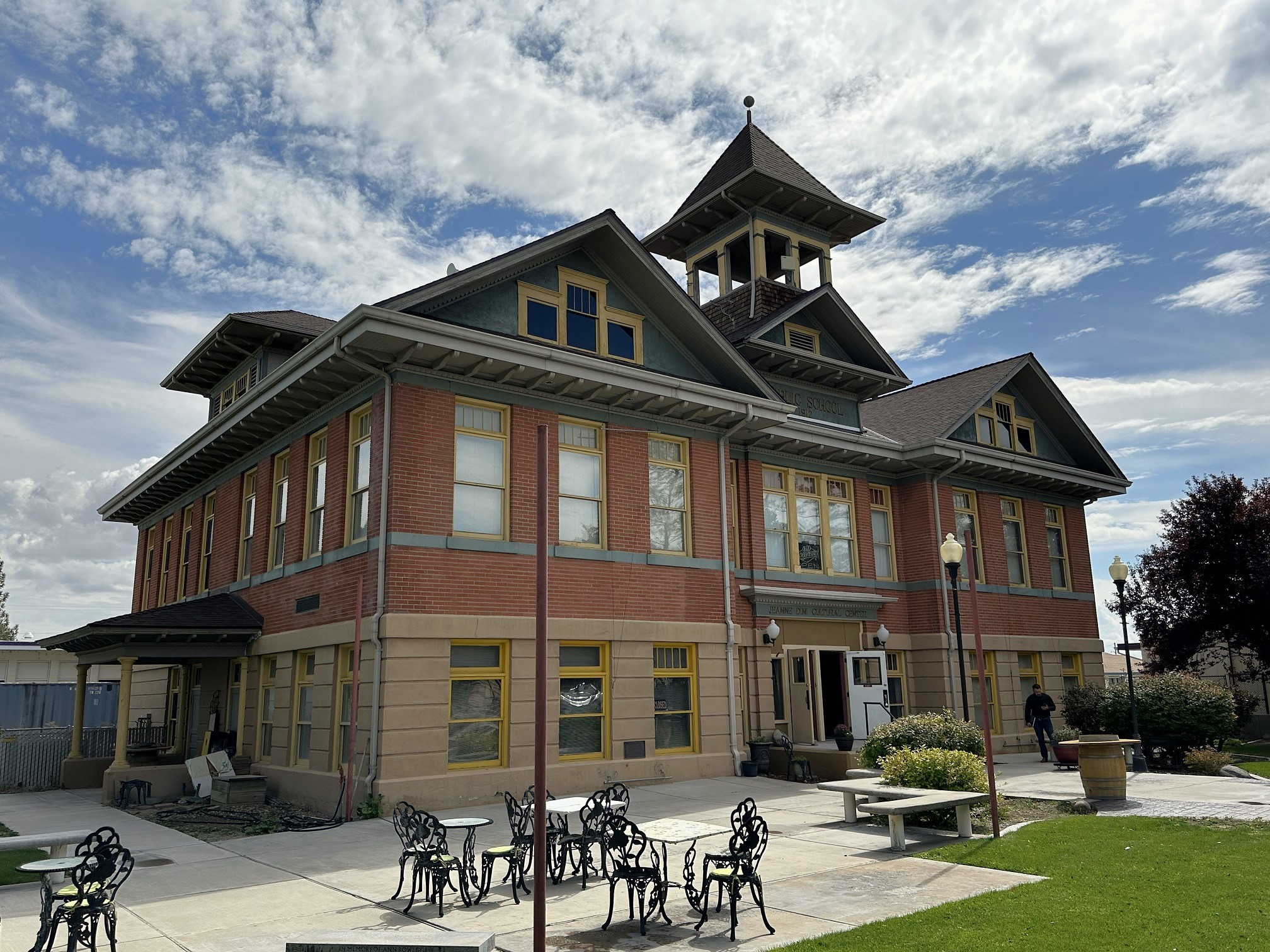
- Yerington Grammar School in 2024

- Location within Nevada Location within the United States
- Location: 112 N. California St. Yerington, Nevada
- Coordinates: 38°59′3″N 119°9′32″W
- Area: 5.2 acres (2.1 ha)
- Built: 1911
- Architect: McDonald & Beatty; Friedhoff & Hoffel
- Architectural style: Renaissance, Italianate
- NRHP reference No.: 84002075
- Added to NRHP: August 16, 1984

Yerington Grammar School, also known as Yerington Grammar School No. 9, is a former school in Yerington, Nevada. It is listed in the National Register of Historic Places, and is currently home to the Jeanne Dini Center, a community and cultural venue.

== History ==
At the beginning of the 20th century, an expanding economy and population required a new school to be created. Yerington Grammar School No.9 began to be built.

== Building ==
Two Reno architects were hired to design this 16,600 dollar building, C.D. McDonald and J.J. Beatty. Friedhoff and Hoeffel, two Reno contractors, constructed this 2 1/2-story building to accommodate one hundred children.

The bottom floor is made of rusticated concrete blocks, providing a foundation for the main body of the school. The face of the building is quite elaborate, with two balanced pedimented gables over two projecting bays, and a smaller gable over the main entrance. In 1935, this structure was enlarged according to plans created by Delongchamps, preserving the look of the building. This structure continued serving to function of Yerington's elementary school until 1980. A group of local people led by Jeanne Dini initiated the Yerington Grammar School no. 9 Restoration Project in the 1990s. It was restored and transformed into the Yerington Cultural Center.

== Location ==
Yerington Grammar School no. 9 is located at the intersection of California and Littel streets, two blocks off Main in Yerington, Nevada.
