= Humboldt County Courthouse (Nevada) =

Courthouse in Winnemucca

- U.S. National Register of Historic Places
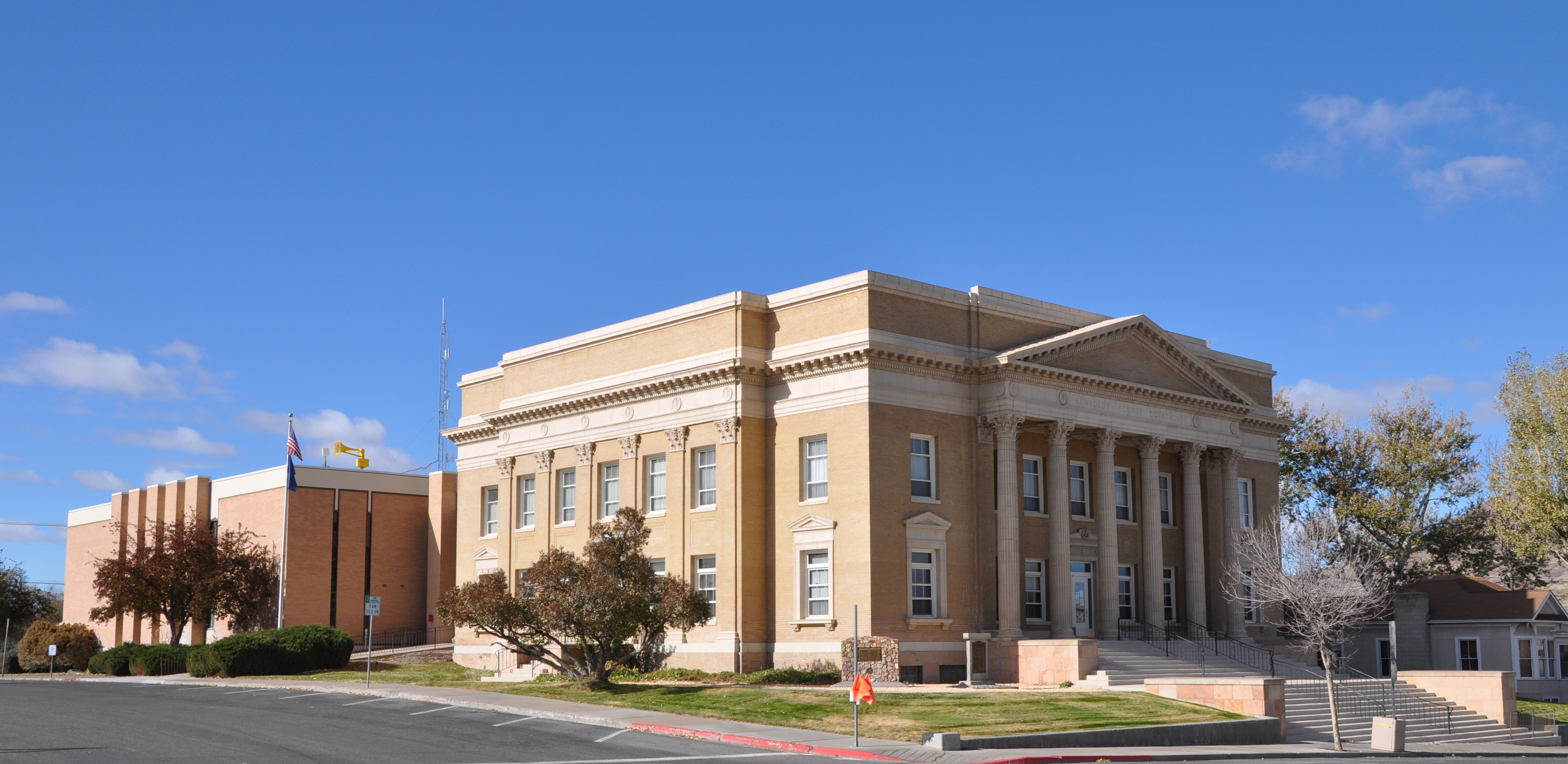
- Humboldt County Courthouse

- Location within Nevada Location within the United States
- Interactive map showing the location of Humboldt County Courthouse
- Location: 5th and Bridge Sts., Winnemucca, Nevada
- Coordinates: 40°57′59″N 117°44′11″W
- Area: less than one acre
- Built: 1921
- Architect: Fredrick J. De Longchamps
- NRHP reference No.: 83001109
- Added to NRHP: August 19, 1983

The Humboldt County Courthouse is a courthouse in Winnemucca, Nevada, the county seat of Humboldt County, Nevada, which was completed in 1921. It was listed on the National Register of Historic Places on August 19, 1983.

It was designed in Classical Revival style by architect Fredrick J. De Longchamps. It has a monumental pedimented portico with Corinthian columns, and it has an entablature which runs all the way around the building.

The building was deemed "significant to the city of Winnemucca and Humboldt County as an outstanding example among the numerous public buildings designed by Frederick J. DeLongchamps, Nevada's most notable historical architect."

== See also ==
- County courthouses in Nevada
- Humboldt County, Nevada
