= Charles H. Burke House =

Historic house in Nevada, United States

- U.S. National Register of Historic Places
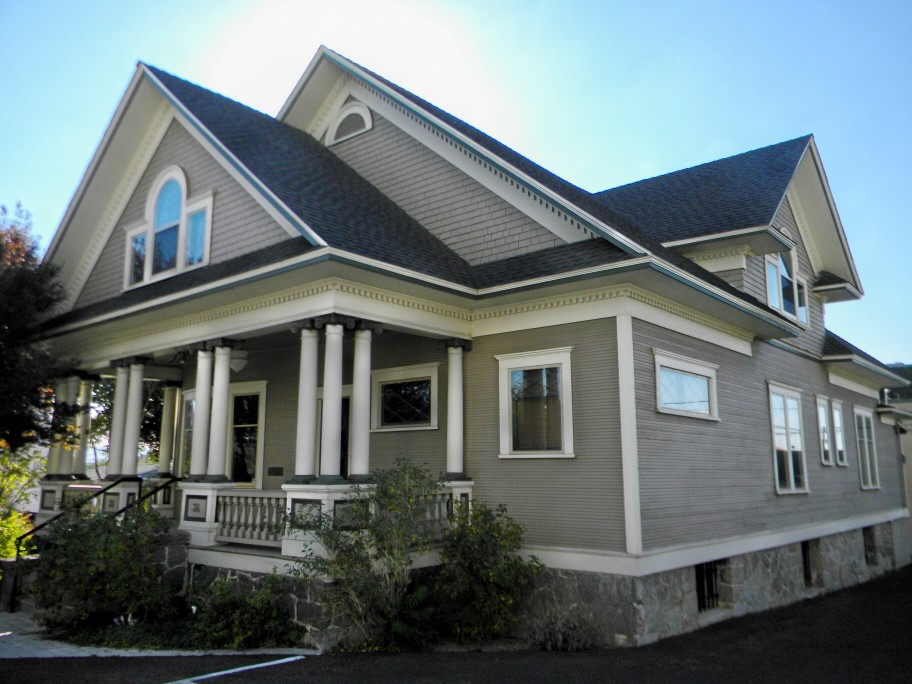

- Location within Nevada Location within the United States
- Location: 36 Stewart St., Reno, Nevada
- Coordinates: 39°31′16″N 119°48′31″W
- Area: less than one acre
- Built: 1908
- Built by: Burke, Charles H.
- Architect: Burke, Charles H.
- Architectural style: Colonial Revival, Queen Anne
- NRHP reference No.: 84002077
- Added to NRHP: May 31, 1984

The Charles H. Burke House, at 36 Stewart St. in Reno, Nevada, is a historic house with Colonial Revival and Queen Anne elements that was designed and built by Charles H. Burke in 1908.

It was listed on the National Register of Historic Places in 1984. It was deemed significant for its architecture, and for its association with Charles H. Burke (1865–1944). Burke developed a subdivision termed the Burke's Addition, and more, in southeast Reno.

== See also ==
- Burke-Berryman House, 418 Cheney St., Reno, also NRHP-listed
