= Burke–Berryman House =

Historic house in Nevada, United States

- U.S. National Register of Historic Places
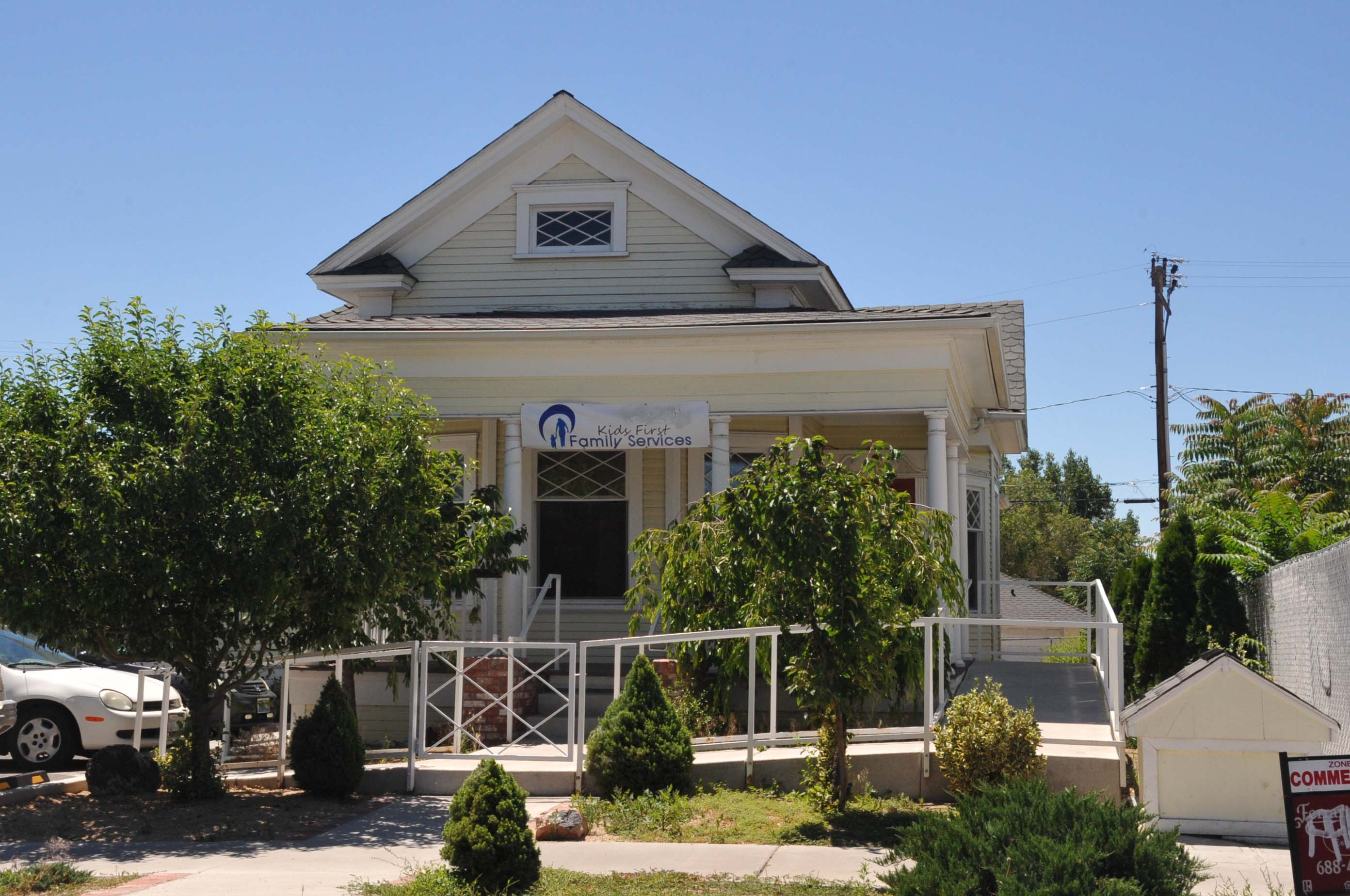

- Location within Nevada Location within the United States
- Location: 418 Cheney St., Reno, Nevada
- Coordinates: 39°31′6″N 119°48′6″W
- Area: 0.2 acres (0.081 ha)
- Built: c.1909-10
- Architectural style: Queen Anne
- NRHP reference No.: 04000984
- Added to NRHP: September 15, 2004

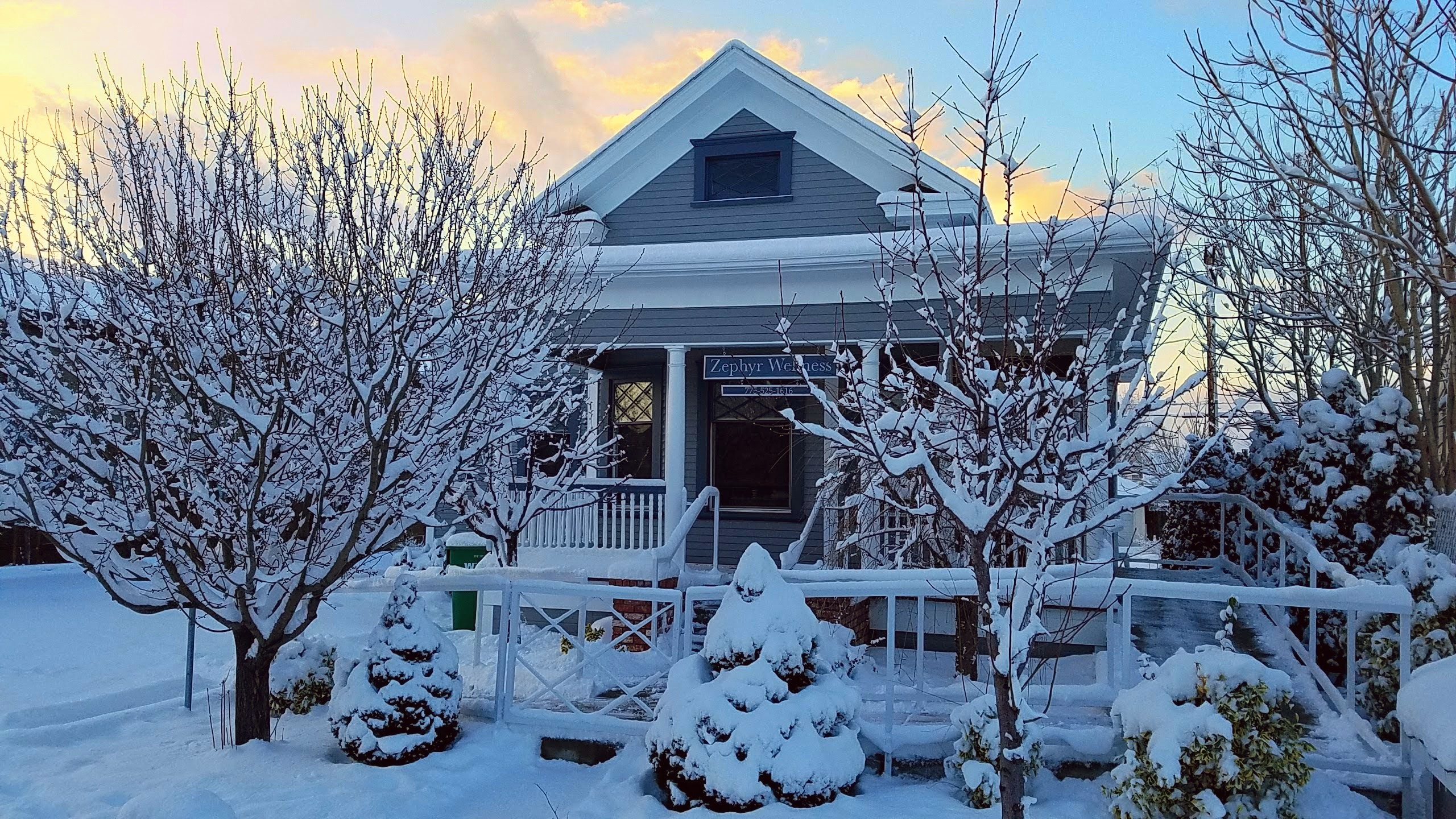

The Burke-Berryman House is listed on the National Register of Historic Places. Charles H. Burke made his way to Reno from Liverpool England by 1890. He supported himself as a blacksmith and horseshoer while beginning to get involved in real estate toward the turn of the century. During this period, most development in Reno was north of the Truckee River. Burke saw an opportunity in Southeast Reno and is responsible for developing several blocks in the neighborhoods surrounding Wells Avenue. He supported the completion of a trolley line in 1910 that ran down Wells Avenue to service the residents in his developments. <https://storymaps.arcgis.com/stories/231629bb977b47d58968663f7d1ebcc6>

The Burke–Berryman House, at 418 Cheney St. in Reno, Nevada, has elements of Queen Anne and Colonial Revival architecture. It was built c.1909-10 as a rental house in the "Burke's Addition" area of Reno, developed by Charles H. Burke.

An early occupant was Samuel W. Goodale, a Chief Surveyor with the U.S. Survey Office, who lived there up to c.1917. It was sold to James J. Berryman in 1919 and he and his wife lived there from 1919 to 1934. It is one of relatively few houses of its era surviving in its neighborhood. It is now owned and maintained by Oasis Pond Supply.

It was listed on the National Register of Historic Places in 2004. It was deemed significant for "its role in Reno's community planning and development history" and "as an excellent local example of simplified residential Queen Anne/Colonial Revival architecture."

== See also ==
- Charles H. Burke House, also in the Burke Addition area and also NRHP-listed
