= National Register of Historic Places listings in Nye County, Nevada =

Contents: List of Registered Historic Places in Nye County, Nevada, USA:

The locations of National Register properties and districts (at least for all showing latitude and longitude coordinates below), may be seen in an online map by clicking on "Map of all coordinates".

This National Park Service list is complete through NPS recent listings posted November 21, 2025.

Contents: Counties in Nevada / See also: Nevada state-wide list
- Carson City
- Churchill
- Clark
- Douglas
- Elko
- Esmeralda
- Eureka
- Humboldt
- Lander
- Lincoln
- Lyon
- Mineral
- Nye
- Pershing
- Storey
- Washoe
- White Pine

== Current listings ==
	Name on the Register	Image	Date listed	Location	City or town	Description
1	George A. Bartlett House	George A. Bartlett House	May 20, 1982 (#82003215)	McQuillan and Booker Sts. 38°04′02″N 117°14′06″W	Tonopah	
2	Bass Building	Bass Building	May 20, 1982 (#82003216)	119 St. Patrick; 38°04′03″N 117°13′53″W	Tonopah	
3	Belmont	Belmont	June 13, 1972 (#72000766)	46 miles northeast of Tonopah off State Route 82; 38°35′33″N 116°52′16″W	Tonopah	A ghost town.
4	William H. Berg House		January 11, 1984 (#84002076)	Mariposa and Davis Sts. 38°42′38″N 117°04′05″W	Round Mountain	
5	Berlin Historic District	Berlin Historic District	November 5, 1971 (#71000490)	Off State Route 23; 38°52′56″N 117°36′26″W	Berlin	
6	Cada C. Boak House	Cada C. Boak House	May 20, 1982 (#82003217)	Ellis St. 38°03′47″N 117°13′48″W	Tonopah	
7	Board and Batten Cottage	Board and Batten Cottage	May 20, 1982 (#82003218)	Edwards St. 38°03′47″N 117°13′48″W	Tonopah	
8	Board and Batten Miners Cabin	Board and Batten Miners Cabin	May 20, 1982 (#82003219)	Burro Ave. 38°04′11″N 117°13′49″W	Tonopah	
9	Brann Boardinghouse	Brann Boardinghouse	May 20, 1982 (#82003220)	Bryan St. 38°03′57″N 117°13′54″W	Tonopah	
10	Brokers Exchange	Brokers Exchange	May 20, 1982 (#82003221)	209-251 Brougher; 38°04′05″N 117°13′54″W	Tonopah	
11	Hugh H. Brown House	Hugh H. Brown House	October 13, 1982 (#82000613)	129 Ellis St. 38°03′53″N 117°13′50″W	Tonopah	
12	E.E. Burdick House	E.E. Burdick House	May 20, 1982 (#82003223)	248 Prospect St. 38°03′55″N 117°13′52″W	Tonopah	
13	Jim Butler Mining Company Stone Row Houses	Jim Butler Mining Company Stone Row Houses	May 20, 1982 (#82003224)	314 Everett Ave. 38°03′58″N 117°13′51″W	Tonopah	
14	Campbell and Kelly Building	Campbell and Kelly Building	October 13, 1982 (#82000614)	Corona and Main Sts. 38°04′12″N 117°13′55″W	Tonopah	
15	Charles Clinton Stone Row House	Charles Clinton Stone Row House	May 20, 1982 (#82003225)	151 Central; 38°04′04″N 117°13′55″W	Tonopah	
16	Combellack Adobe Row House	Combellack Adobe Row House	May 20, 1982 (#82003226)	Central St. 38°04′07″N 117°13′57″W	Tonopah	
17	Uri B. Curtis House	Uri B. Curtis House	May 20, 1982 (#82003227)	169 Booker St. 38°03′56″N 117°13′59″W	Tonopah	
18	Uri B. Curtis House/Tasker L. Oddie House	Uri B. Curtis House/Tasker L. Oddie House	May 20, 1982 (#82003228)	Ellis St. 38°03′55″N 117°14′01″W	Tonopah	
19	Samuel C. Dunham House	Samuel C. Dunham House	May 20, 1982 (#82003229)	Belmont Ave. 38°04′01″N 117°13′34″W	Tonopah	
20	Frame Cottage	Frame Cottage	May 20, 1982 (#82003230)	183 Prospect St. 38°03′59″N 117°13′58″W	Tonopah	
21	Gatecliff Rockshelter	Gatecliff Rockshelter	April 27, 1979 (#79001464)	Southeast of Austin; 39°00′25″N 116°46′43″W	Austin	
22	Frank Golden Block	Frank Golden Block	May 20, 1982 (#82003231)	Brougher and Main Sts. 38°04′06″N 117°13′52″W	Tonopah	
23	John Gregovich House	John Gregovich House	May 20, 1982 (#82003232)	101 Summit; 38°04′03″N 117°13′57″W	Tonopah	
24	James Wild Horse Trap		November 19, 1974 (#74001148)	About 5 miles east of Fish Springs; 38°46′21″N 116°21′28″W	Fish Springs	
25	Zeb Kendall House	Zeb Kendall House	May 20, 1982 (#82003233)	159 University Ave. 38°03′58″N 117°14′00″W	Tonopah	
26	Manhattan School	Manhattan School	March 8, 2006 (#06000108)	Gold St. between Mineral St. and Dexter Ave. 38°32′23″N 117°04′26″W	Manhattan	
27	Dr. J.R. Masterson House	Dr. J.R. Masterson House	May 20, 1982 (#82003234)	Ohio Ave. and 2nd St. 38°04′09″N 117°14′17″W	Tonopah	
28	Irving McDonald House	Irving McDonald House	May 20, 1982 (#82003235)	191 Booker; 38°03′54″N 117°13′57″W	Tonopah	
29	H.A. McKim Building	H.A. McKim Building	May 20, 1982 (#82003236)	Main and Oddie Sts. 38°04′10″N 117°13′54″W	Tonopah	
30	Mizpah Hotel	Mizpah Hotel	July 7, 1978 (#78001725)	100 Main St. 38°04′05″N 117°13′48″W	Tonopah	
31	Nevada-California Power Company Substation and Auxiliary Power Building	Nevada-California Power Company Substation and Auxiliary Power Building	July 26, 1982 (#82003237)	Corner of Knapp and Cutting Sts. 38°04′10″N 117°14′10″W	Tonopah	
32	Nye County Courthouse	Nye County Courthouse	May 20, 1982 (#82003238)	McCulloch St. 38°03′56″N 117°13′37″W	Tonopah	
33	Nye County Mercantile Company Building		May 20, 1982 (#82003239)	147 Main St. 38°04′08″N 117°13′53″W	Tonopah	
34	Arthur Raycraft House	Arthur Raycraft House	May 20, 1982 (#82003240)	Booker St. 38°04′03″N 117°14′10″W	Tonopah	
35	St. Marks P.E. Church	St. Marks P.E. Church	May 20, 1982 (#82003246)	210 University Ave. 38°03′55″N 117°13′53″W	Tonopah	
36	Judge W.A. Sawle House	Judge W.A. Sawle House	May 20, 1982 (#82003241)	155 Central St. 38°04′02″N 117°13′54″W	Tonopah	
37	Sedan Crater	Sedan Crater	March 21, 1994 (#94000183)	Area 10, Nevada Test Site; 37°10′37″N 116°02′43″W	Mercury	Man-made crater formed by nuclear test explosion
38	Cal Shaw Adobe Duplex	Cal Shaw Adobe Duplex	May 20, 1982 (#82003243)	129 Central; 38°04′07″N 117°13′56″W	Tonopah	
39	Cal Shaw Stone Row House	Cal Shaw Stone Row House	May 20, 1982 (#82003242)	Central St. 38°03′56″N 117°13′44″W	Tonopah	
40	E.R. Shields House	E.R. Shields House	May 20, 1982 (#82003244)	351 St. Patrick; 38°03′57″N 117°13′44″W	Tonopah	
41	State Bank and Trust Company	State Bank and Trust Company	May 20, 1982 (#82003247)	102 Brougher; 38°04′05″N 117°13′51″W	Tonopah	
42	Stone Jail Building and Row House	Stone Jail Building and Row House	May 20, 1982 (#82003248)	Water St. 38°04′18″N 117°13′50″W	Tonopah	
43	Tonopah Liquor Company Building	Tonopah Liquor Company Building	May 20, 1982 (#82003249)	Main St. 38°04′07″N 117°13′52″W	Tonopah	
44	Tonopah Mining Company Cottage	Tonopah Mining Company Cottage	May 20, 1982 (#82003250)	Queen St. 38°04′08″N 117°13′29″W	Tonopah	
45	Tonopah Mining Company House	Tonopah Mining Company House	May 20, 1982 (#82003251)	Queen St. 38°04′07″N 117°13′27″W	Tonopah	
46	Tonopah Public Library	Tonopah Public Library	May 20, 1982 (#82003252)	171 Central; 38°04′01″N 117°13′54″W	Tonopah	
47	Tonopah Volunteer Firehouse and Gymnasium	Tonopah Volunteer Firehouse and Gymnasium	May 20, 1982 (#82003253)	Brougher and Burro Sts. 38°04′06″N 117°13′48″W	Tonopah	
48	Tonopah-Extension Mining Company Power Building	Tonopah-Extension Mining Company Power Building	May 20, 1982 (#82003254)	Main St. 38°04′10″N 117°13′54″W	Tonopah	
49	Tybo Charcoal Kilns		November 19, 1974 (#74001149)	About 55 miles northeast of Tonopah off U.S. Route 6; 38°22′18″N 116°25′49″W	Tybo	
50	US Post Office-Tonopah Main	US Post Office-Tonopah Main	February 28, 1990 (#90000136)	201 Main St. 38°04′03″N 117°13′47″W	Tonopah	
51	Verdi Lumber Company Buildings		May 20, 1982 (#82003255)	Main St. 38°04′10″N 117°13′54″W	Tonopah	
52	Water Company of Tonopah Building	Water Company of Tonopah Building	May 20, 1982 (#82003256)	Burro and Brougher Aves. 38°04′06″N 117°13′47″W	Tonopah	
53	Wieland Brewery Building	Wieland Brewery Building	May 20, 1982 (#82003257)	Mineral St. 38°04′05″N 117°13′48″W	Tonopah	

== Former listings ==
	Name on the Register	Image	Date listed	Date removed	Location	City or town	Description
1	J. E. Smith Stone Duplex		July 26, 1982 (#82003245)	October 13, 2000	415 Florence	Tonopah	Demolished in 1993.

== See also ==
- List of National Historic Landmarks in Nevada
- National Register of Historic Places listings in Nevada
