= Stone Jail Building and Row House =

- U.S. National Register of Historic Places
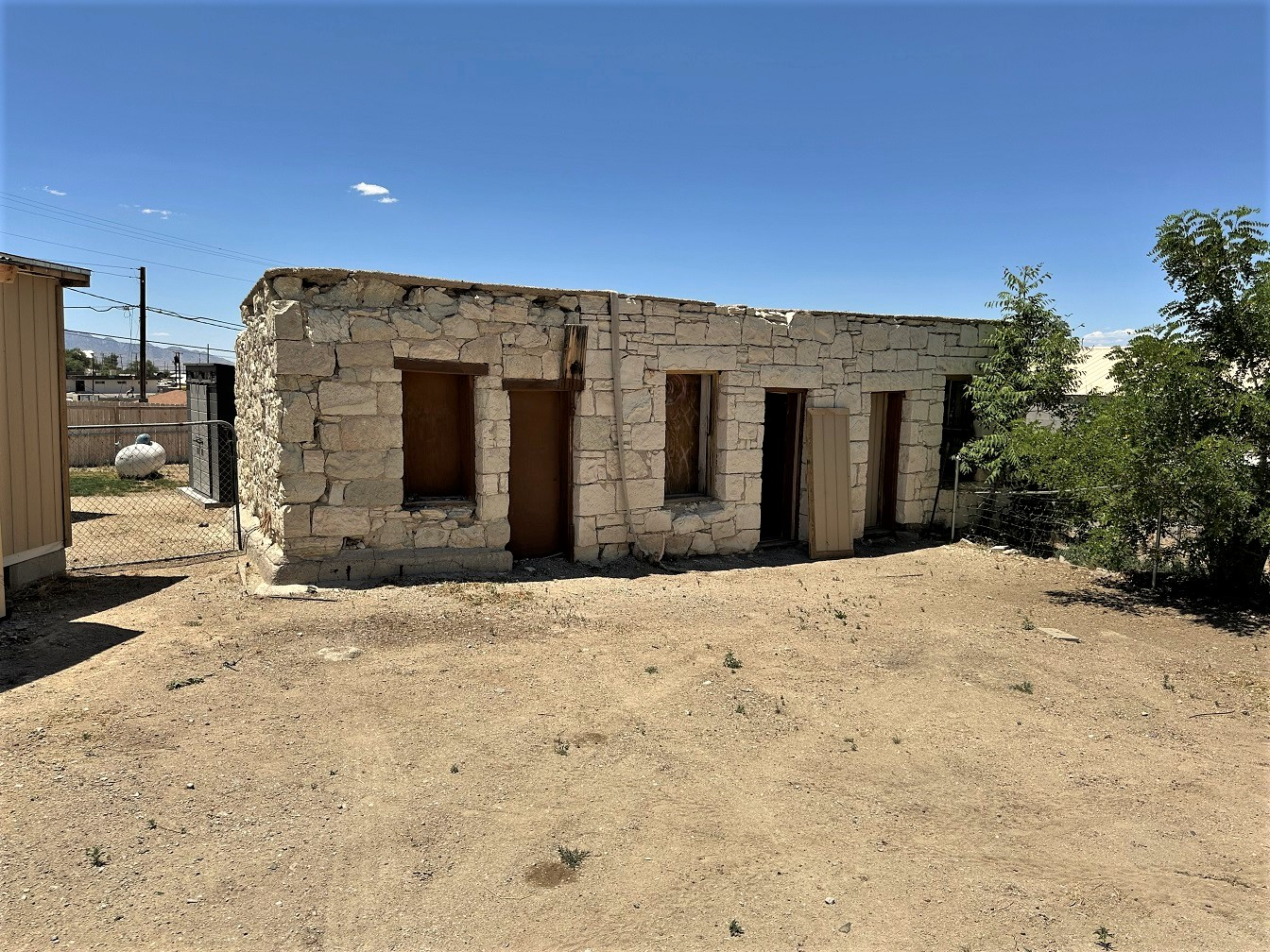
- The building in 2024

- Location within Nevada Location within the United States
- Location: Water St. Tonopah, Nevada
- Area: less than one acre
- Built: 1903
- MPS: Tonopah MRA
- NRHP reference No.: 82003248
- Added to NRHP: May 20, 1982

The Stone Jail Building and Row House are two adjacent stone buildings located on Water Street in Tonopah, Nevada. The jail was built in 1903 and the adjacent row house in 1908. Both building were at one time used as a brothel. The buildings were added to the National Register of Historic Places in 1982.

== History ==
In May 1900 prospector Jim Butler found silver ore in Mount Oddle. Other prospectors followed, and a small mining town started to grow at the foot of the hills. By November 1900 this had grown into the town of Tonopah. In 1901 a timber framed jail had been built, and at the end of that year the population had risen to between 2,000 and 3,000.

The more secure stone jail was built in 1903 to replace the existing timer frame building. The jail was built on Water Street, which was considered Tonopah's red light district at the time, possibly because county commissioner Egan and district attorney Charles L. Richards wished to keep the jail out of the town's more prominent areas.

The Nye County seat was moved from Belmont to Tonopah in 1905, and the Nye County Courthouse built. A jail was added to the courthouse in 1907 and the old jail became a private residence.

The adjacent row house, ("cribs") was built in 1908 as a brothel and the jail also became a brothel around this time. The row house has since been called "one of the best preserved brothels in Tonopah" by a historic survey. The jail was at some time used as a garage.

== Architecture ==
The jail house is a single story building of 20 by 25 feet. It is built of uncut random stone with chink and mortar bonding, under a double pitched corrugated metal roof. The original steel door is no longer in place and the opening enlarged to take timber garage doors. At the time of listing as a historic place, the window still had the original steel bars in place. A shed roof addition was built in about 1908, but this was later removed.

The row house is also a single story rectangular building built of cut granite. The original sloping asphalt roof was still in place at the time of listing. The building is divided into 3 bays of a single room, each room having its own external door and window. This is a typical "crib" arrangement for prostitution.

== National Register of Historic Places ==
The buildings were added to the register on May 20, 1982, as one of a number of buildings in Tonopah added on that date. Others added included Nye County Courthouse, Tonopah Public Library and Tonopah Volunteer Firehouse and Gymnasium.
