= Judge W. A. Sawle House =

Historic house in Nevada, United States

- U.S. National Register of Historic Places
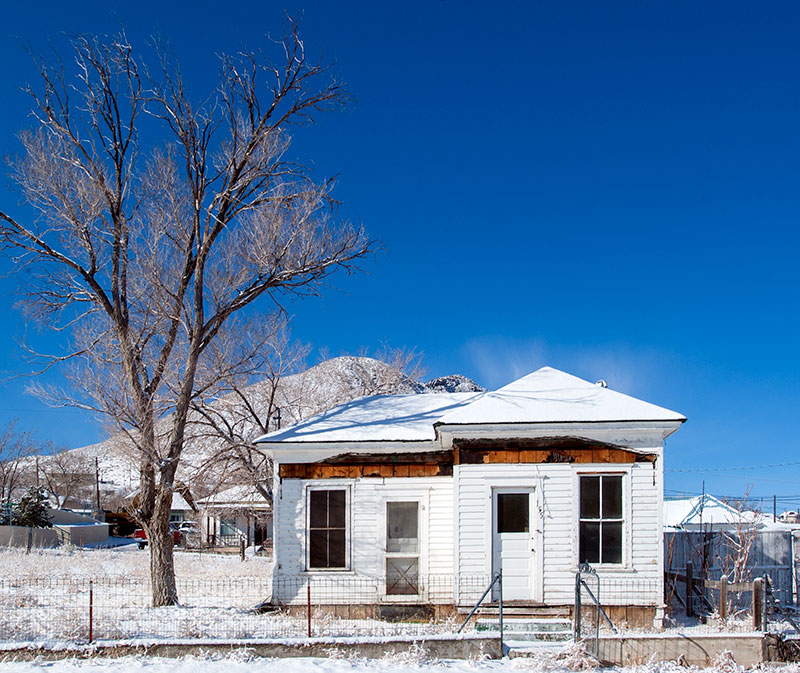

- Location within Nevada Location within the United States
- Location: 155 Central St., Tonopah, Nevada
- Coordinates: 38.0672°N 117.23193°W
- Area: less than one acre
- Built: 1904
- Architectural style: Late Victorian, Colonial Revival
- MPS: Tonopah MRA
- NRHP reference No.: 82003241
- Added to NRHP: May 20, 1982

The Judge W. A. Sawle House is a historic house located at 151 Central Street in Tonopah, Nevada, United States. W. A. Sawle, the local Justice of the Peace, built the house for himself in 1904. The frame house was designed in a blend of the Late Victorian and Colonial Revival styles. The home has a T-shaped plan and features a verandah with a crooked shape and a balustrade, wooden jig-cut bracketing along the top of the verandah, and a hipped roof. While living in the house, Sawle became Nye County's recorder and auditor, helped establish Tonopah's first Justice Court building, fathered the first baby born in the city, and invested in the local mining business.

The house was added to the National Register of Historic Places on May 20, 1982.
