= Tonopah Extension Mining Company Power Building =

- Tonapah Extension Mining Company Power Building
- U.S. National Register of Historic Places
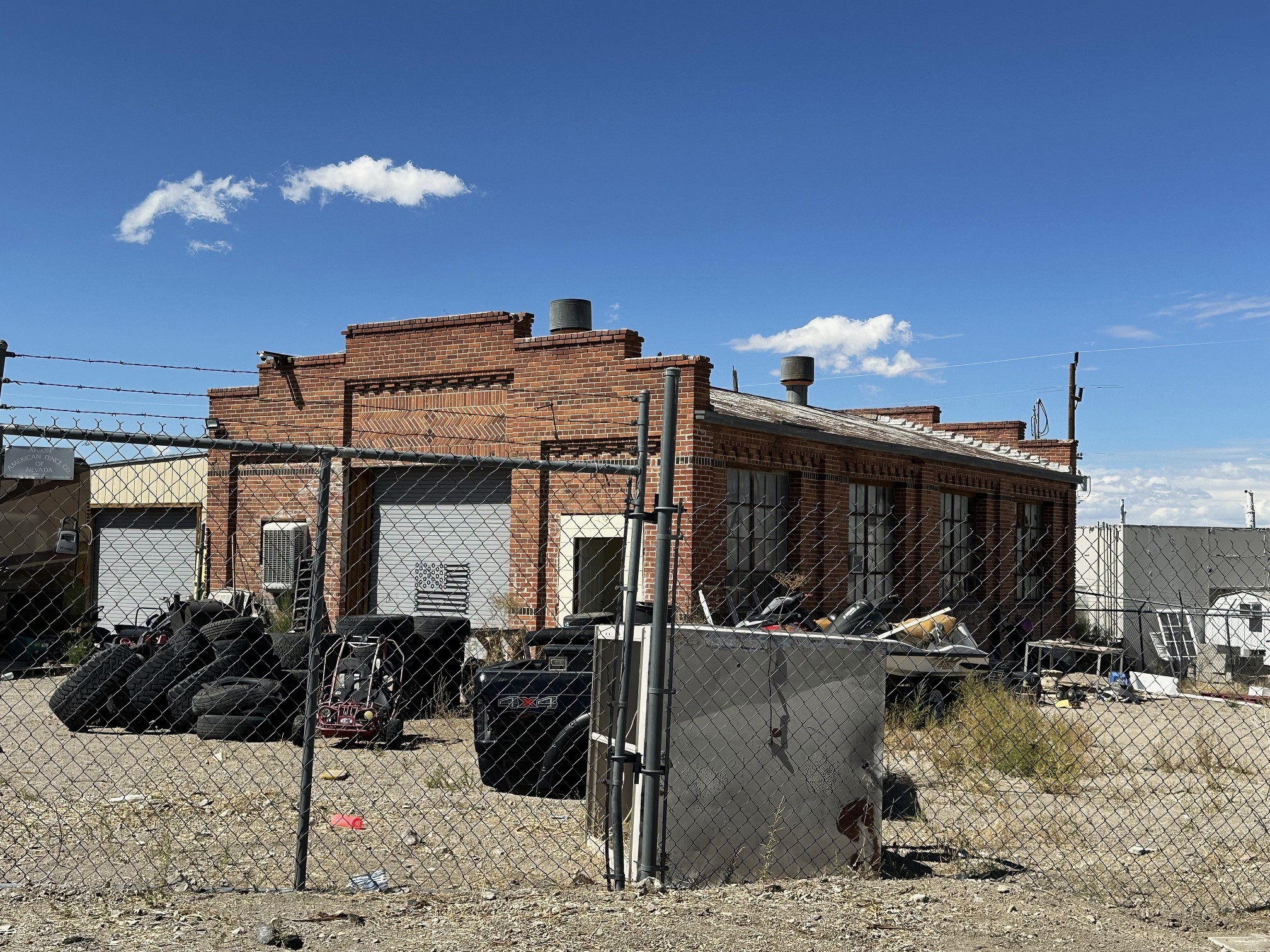

- Location within Nevada Location within the United States
- Location: Main St., Tonopah, Nevada
- Coordinates: 38.07185°N 117.23698°W
- Area: less than one acre
- Built: c. 1920
- MPS: Tonopah MRA
- NRHP reference No.: 82003254
- Added to NRHP: May 20, 1982

The Tonapah Extension Mining Company Power Building is a historic power plant located on Main Street in Tonopah, Nevada. The building was constructed by 1920 by the Tonopah Extension Mining Company, possibly as a replacement for a 1909 plant. The plant was built with fired brick, an unusual construction material in the area. It is the only surviving building from the Tonopah Extension Mine, a major Tonopah mine which opened in 1903.

The building was added to the National Register of Historic Places on May 20, 1982.
