= Wieland Brewery Building =

- U.S. National Register of Historic Places
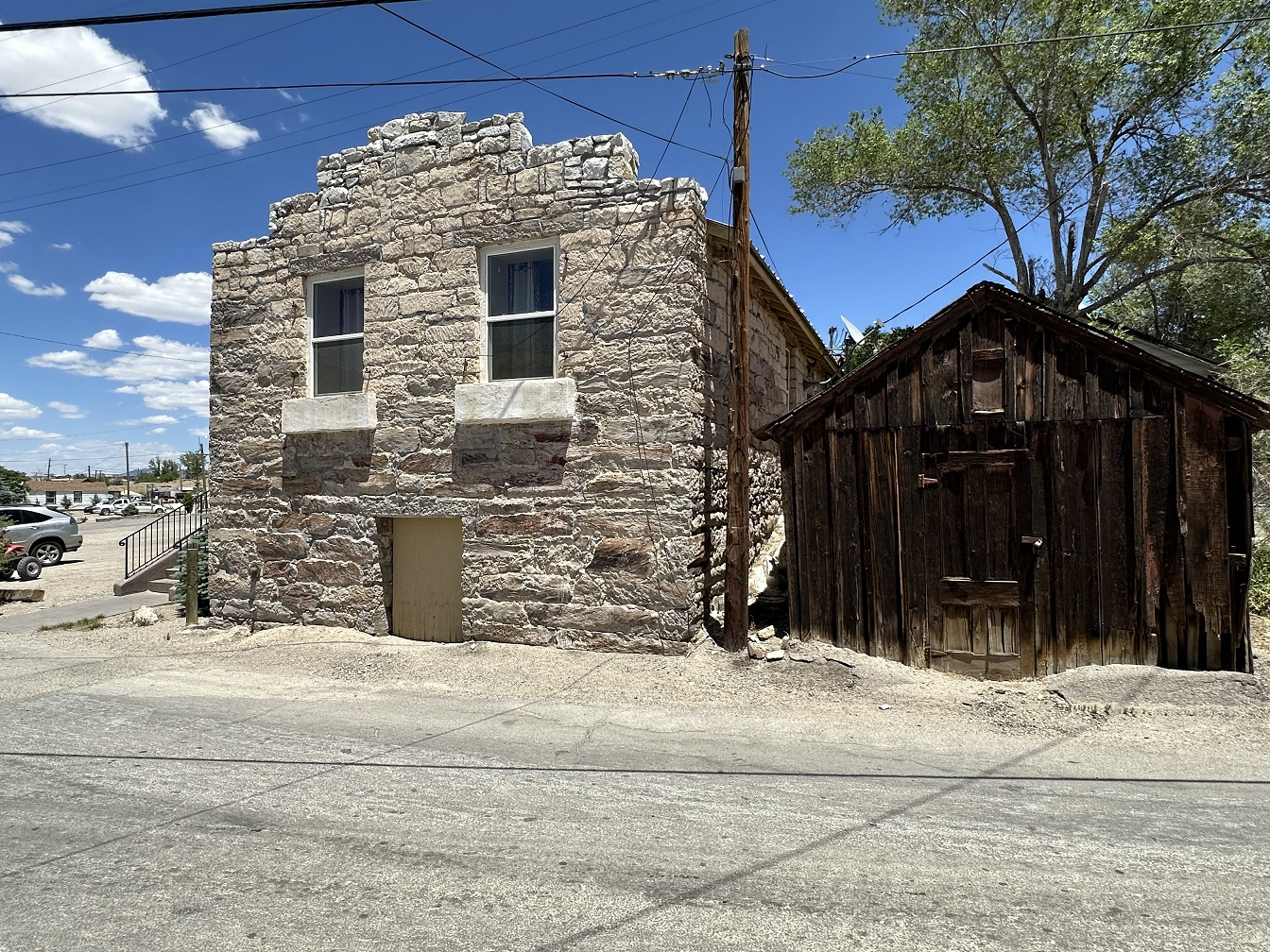
- The building in 2024

- Location within Nevada Location within the United States
- Location: Mineral St. Tonopah, Nevada
- Area: less than one acre
- Built: 1901
- MPS: Tonopah MRA
- NRHP reference No.: 82003257
- Added to NRHP: May 20, 1982

The Wieland Brewery Building is a historic building located on Mineral Street in Tonopah, Nevada. Built in 1901, the building was the first stone building constructed in Tonopah. It was also one of the first permanent buildings built in the town, which was still primarily a mining camp at the time. The building had several owners in its early years. It was apparently first owned by H.C. Brougher, but businessman Harry King bought the brewery by the end of 1901. King sold the brewery to two other businessmen in the spring 1902 but purchased it again by the following October. At the end of 1902, King added a crafted parapet to the building, which indicates that Tonopah had local stone craftsmen by that time.

The brewery was added to the National Register of Historic Places on May 20, 1982.
