= Tonopah Mining Company House =

Historic house in Nevada, United States

- Tonapah Mining Company House
- U.S. National Register of Historic Places
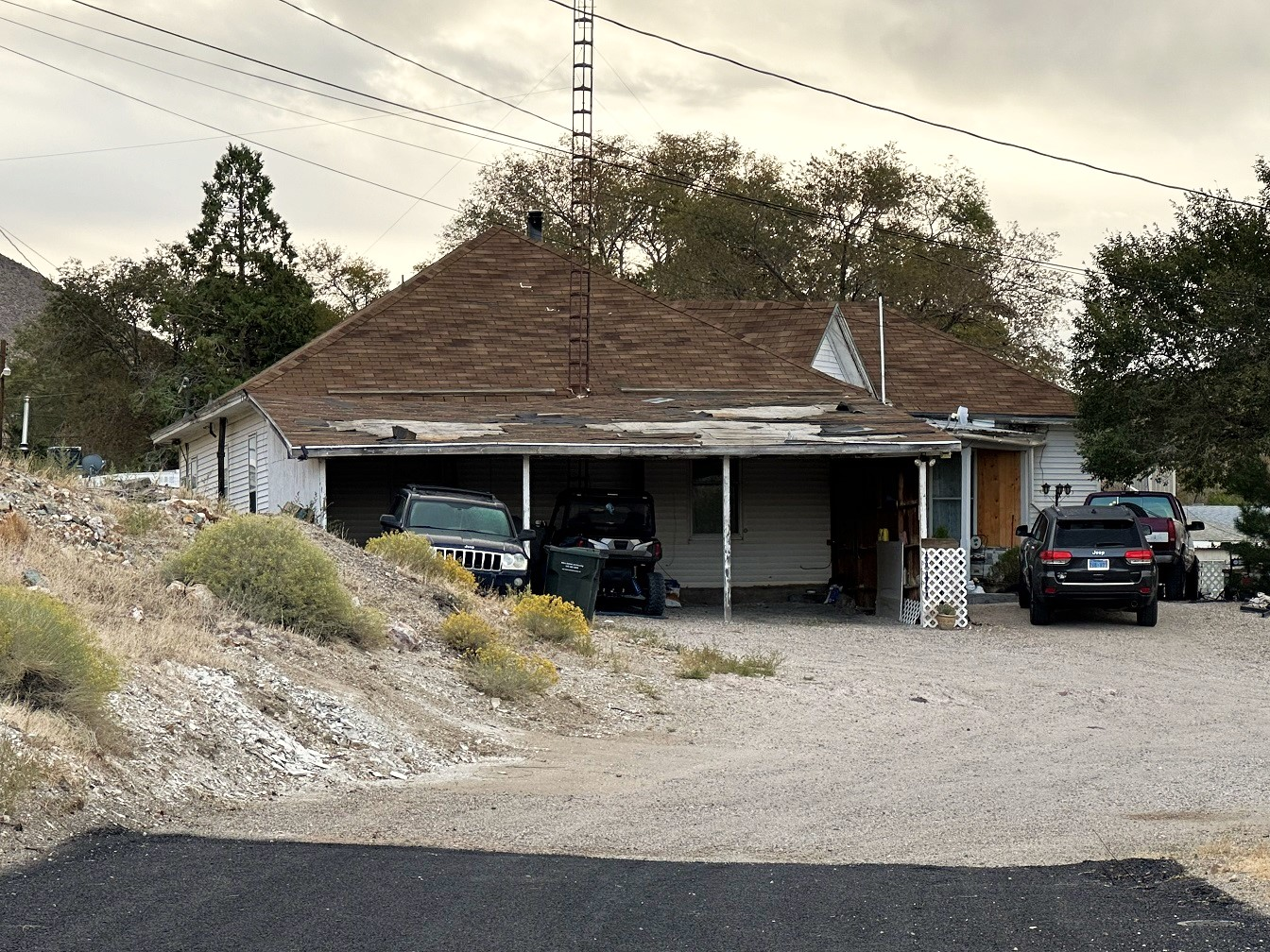
- Location: Queen St., Tonopah, Nevada
- Area: less than one acre
- Built: 1904
- Architectural style: Georgian Revival
- MPS: Tonopah MRA
- NRHP reference No.: 82003251
- Added to NRHP: May 20, 1982

The Tonopah Mining Company House is a historic house located on Queen Street in Tonopah, Nevada. The house was built in 1904 by the Tonopah Mining Company and served as a company house for its employees. The wood-frame house was designed in the Georgian Revival style. The house's design features an entrance porch topped by a gable, three chimneys, boxed eaves, and molded cornices.

The house was added to the National Register of Historic Places on May 20, 1982.
