= Verdi Lumber Company Buildings =

- Verdi Lumber Company Building
- U.S. National Register of Historic Places
- Location: Main St., Tonopah, Nevada
- Area: less than one acre
- Built: 1911
- MPS: Tonopah MRA
- NRHP reference No.: 82003255
- Added to NRHP: May 20, 1982

The Verdi Lumber Company Buildings are three historic buildings on Main St. in Tonopah, Nevada. The buildings include two two-story lumber sheds, one open and one enclosed, and a storage building. The buildings were constructed in 1911, the year the Verdi Lumber Company was incorporated. A branch of the Tonopah and Goldfield Railroad connected to the site, allowing the company to transport its products. The company eventually became the largest lumber company in central Nevada. The three buildings are the only remaining buildings from the company's Tonopah facilities.

The buildings were added to the National Register of Historic Places on May 20, 1982.
