= H. A. McKim Building =

- McKim, H. A., Building
- U.S. National Register of Historic Places
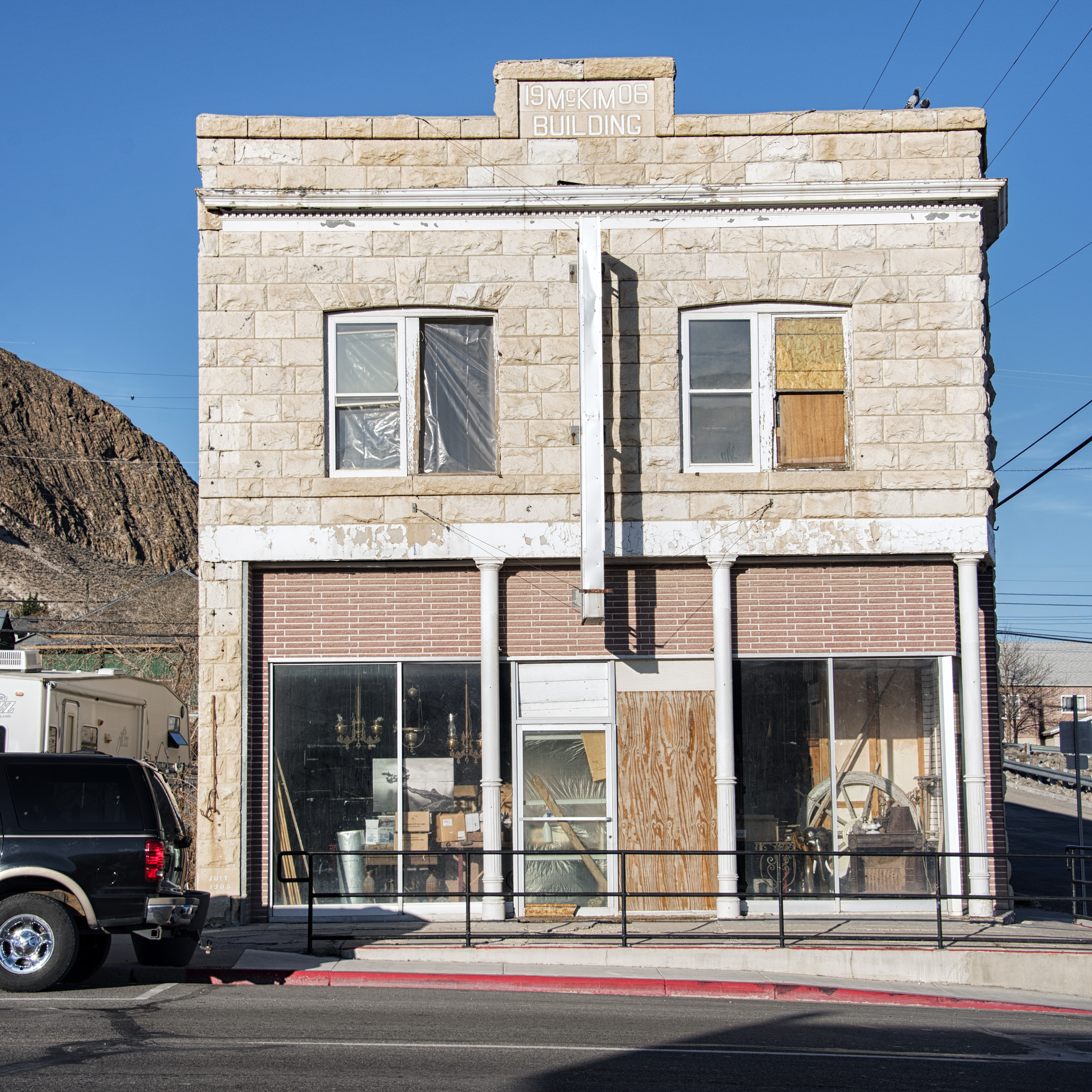
- H. A. McKim Building in 2021

- Location within Nevada Location within the United States
- Location: Main and Oddie Sts. Tonopah, Nevada
- Coordinates: 38.06937°N 117.23183°W
- Area: less than one acre
- Built: 1906
- Built by: E.E. Burdick, J.J. Finley
- Architectural style: Classical Revival
- MPS: Tonopah MRA
- NRHP reference No.: 82003236
- Added to NRHP: May 20, 1982

The H. A. McKim Building is a historic building located at the southwest corner of Main and Oddie Streets in Tonopah, Nevada. The building was constructed in 1906 for Hiram Albert McKim, who had begun a mercantile business in the town two years prior. Carpenter craftsman J. J. Finley and stonemason E. E. Burdick constructed the building, a two-story stone building designed in the Classical Revival style. The building's design includes an ashlar front facade, a pediment at its parapet, second-story windows ornamented with voussoirs and keystones, and a metal cornice. McKim's store ultimately became the largest mercantile store in central Nevada.

The store was added to the National Register of Historic Places on May 20, 1982.
