= Board and Batten Miners Cabin =

Historic house in Nevada, United States

- U.S. National Register of Historic Places
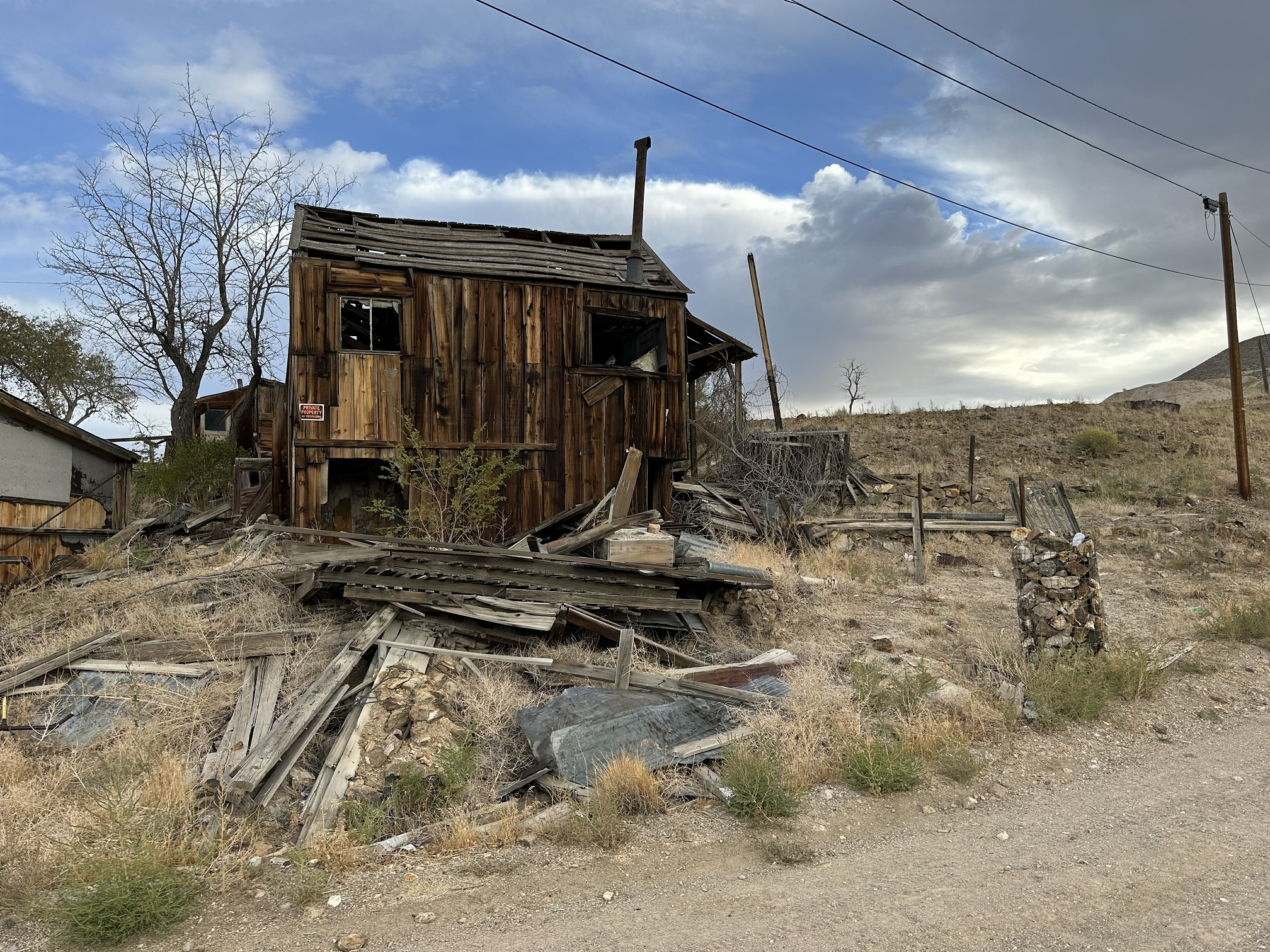
- Board And Batten Miners Cabin in 2024
- Location: Oddie Ave. Tonopah, Nevada
- Area: less than one acre
- Built: 1905
- MPS: Tonopah MRA
- NRHP reference No.: 82003219
- Added to NRHP: May 20, 1982

The Board and Batten Miners Cabin is a historic miner's cabin located on Oddie Ave. in Tonopah, Nevada. The wood-frame cabin has board and batten siding and is topped by double pitched and shed roofs. The cabin is one of many homes built by miners on the side of Mount Oddie. Most of the miners' homes have since been destroyed, and of those that remain, the cabin is one of the most representative of the mining lifestyle.

The cabin was added to the National Register of Historic Places on May 20, 1982.
