= Jim Butler Mining Company Stone Row Houses =

Historic houses in Nevada, United States

- U.S. National Register of Historic Places
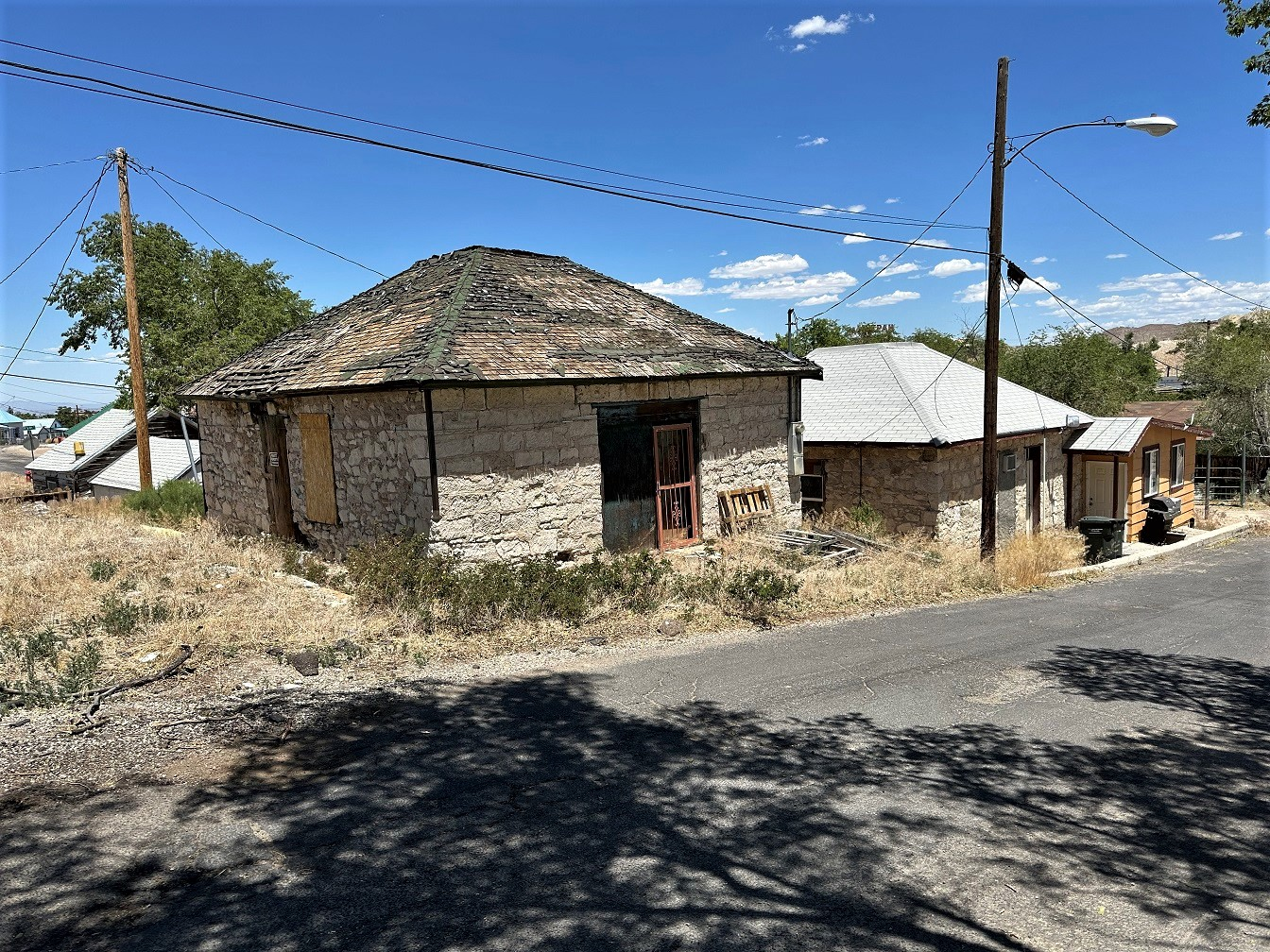
- Jim Butler Mining Company Row Houses in 2024

- Location within Nevada Location within the United States
- Location: 314 Everett Ave. Tonopah, Nevada
- Coordinates: 38.06627°N 117.23103°W
- Area: less than one acre
- Built: 1904
- Built by: Jim Butler Mining Co.
- MPS: Tonopah MRA
- NRHP reference No.: 82003224
- Added to NRHP: May 20, 1982

The Jim Butler Mining Company Stone Row Houses are a pair of stone duplex houses located at 314 Everett Ave. in Tonopah, Nevada, United States. The Jim Butler Mining Company built the houses on its mining grounds in 1904 to house its workers. The houses feature stone walls and pyramid-shaped roofs; each home has two rooms on each side. The homes are typical of workers' housing used in Tonopah's mining industry. Margaret Cluff bought the houses in 1905 to use as rental properties.

The houses were added to the National Register of Historic Places on May 20, 1982.
