= Samuel C. Dunham House =

Historic house in Nevada, United States

- U.S. National Register of Historic Places
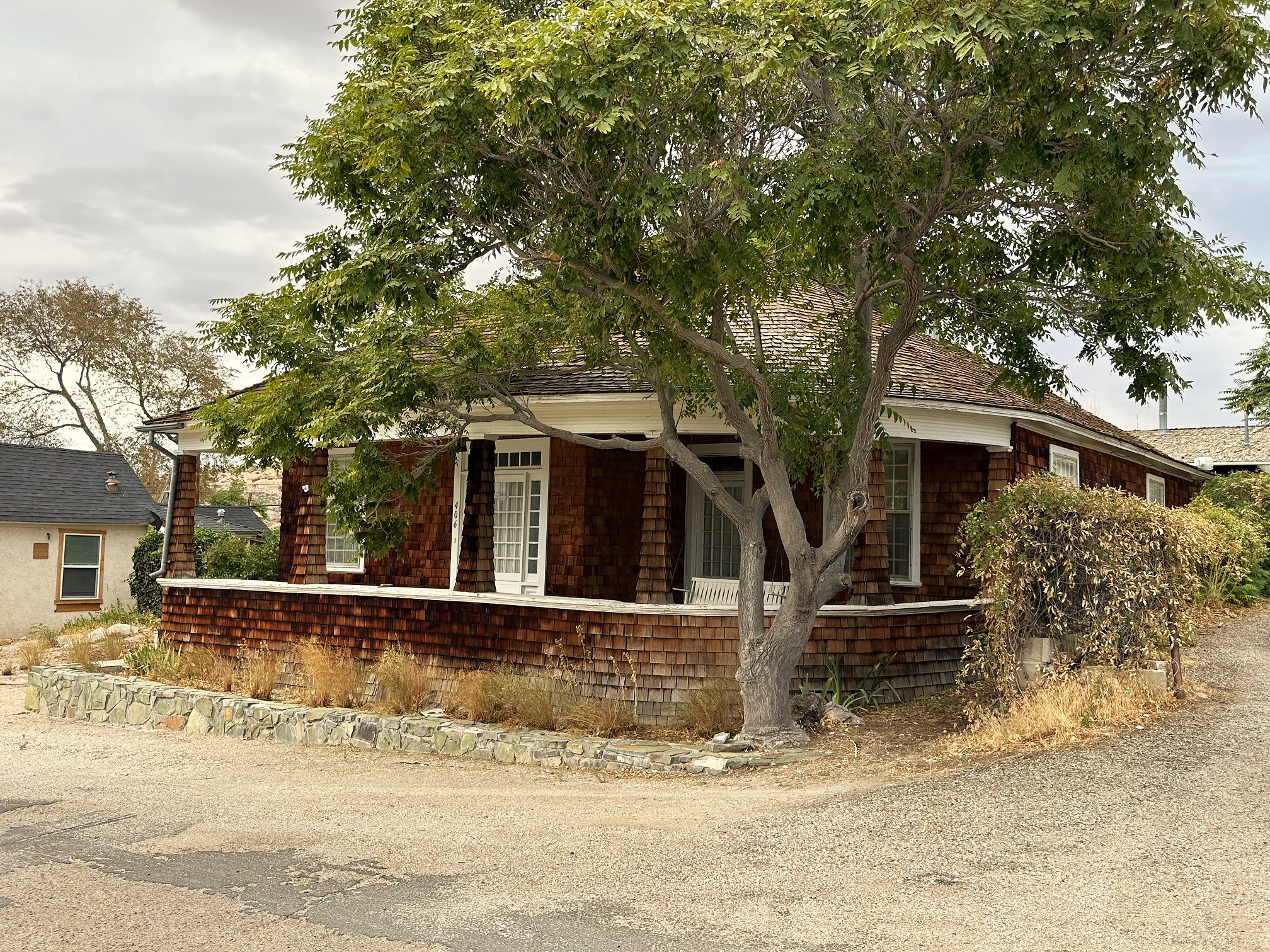

- Location within Nevada Location within the United States
- Location: Belmont Ave., Tonopah, Nevada
- Coordinates: 38.06695°N 117.22606°W
- Built: 1904
- Architectural style: Eastern Shingle
- MPS: Tonopah MRA
- NRHP reference No.: 82003229
- Added to NRHP: May 20, 1982

The Samuel C. Dunham House in Tonopah, Nevada was built in 1904. It is a typical example of the houses built at the time by prosperous businessmen in Tonopah. The bungalow-style house features six tapered shingled columns supporting an expansive front porch, which curves around the corner. It was listed on the National Register of Historic Places in 1982.
