= Board and Batten Cottage =

Historic house in Nevada, United States

- U.S. National Register of Historic Places
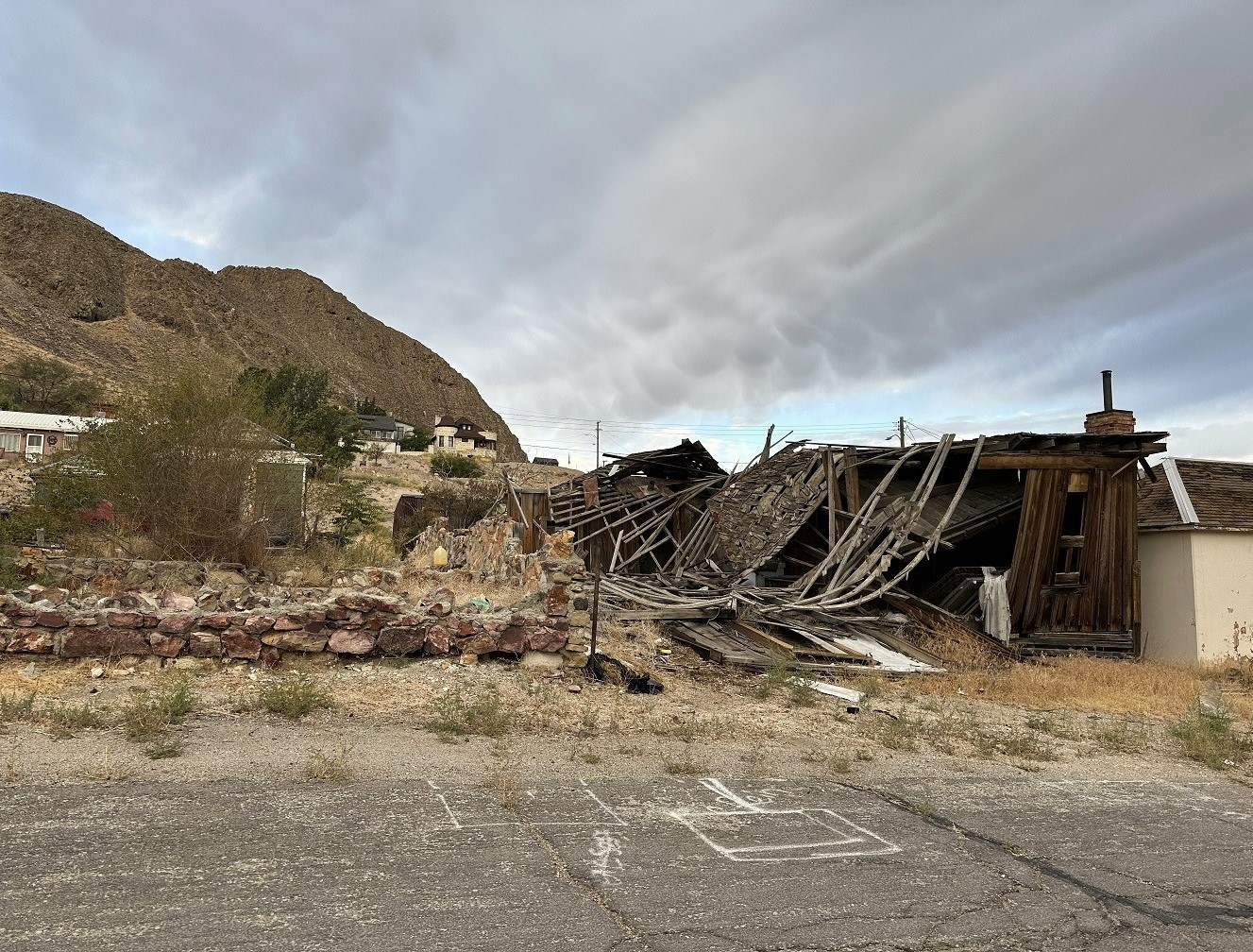
- Board And Batten Cottage in 2024
- Location: Prospect St. Tonopah, Nevada
- Area: less than one acre
- Built: 1909
- MPS: Tonopah MRA
- NRHP reference No.: 82003218
- Added to NRHP: May 20, 1982

The Board and Batten Cottage is a board and batten house located on Prospect Street in Tonopah, Nevada. The house was built in 1909. Its design features a T-shaped plan with symmetrical features, a hipped roof, and molded and boxed cornices along the roof line. The house originally had two porches, including one along the entire front of the building, but both have been removed. Board and batten homes were common in early Tonopah, and the house is a relatively intact example of the style.

The house was added to the National Register of Historic Places on May 20, 1982.
