= Cada C. Boak House =

Historic house in Nevada, United States

- U.S. National Register of Historic Places
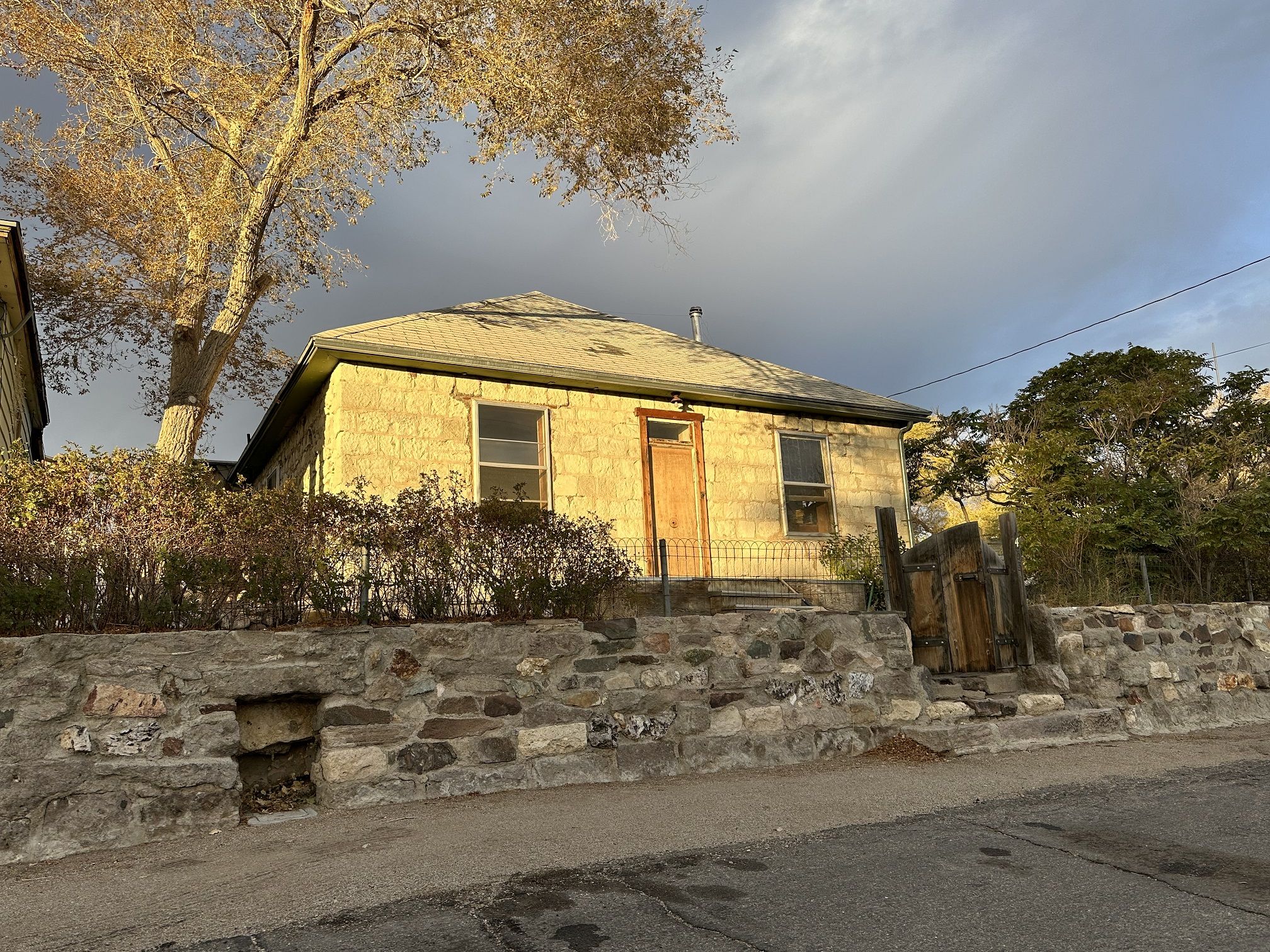

- Location within Nevada Location within the United States
- Location: Ellis St., Tonopah, Nevada
- Coordinates: 38.06281°N 117.2301°W
- Area: less than one acre
- Built: 1906
- Built by: Kanters, A.P.
- MPS: Tonopah MRA
- NRHP reference No.: 82003217
- Added to NRHP: May 20, 1982

The Cada C. Boak House, located on Ellis St. in Tonopah, Nevada, is a stone house that was built in 1906 by one A.P. Kanters. It was listed on the National Register of Historic Places in 1982.

The house is significant for association with important Nevadan Cada C. Boak who bought the house in 1910 and lived there for the rest of his life. He was involved in mining; and among other public contributions, he served as "a national director" of the Highway 50 Association and both founded and served as president of the Western Good Roads Association. He also rediscovered the Lehman Caves and recommended to President Harding that they be named a National Monument, which Harding did.
