= Frame Cottage =

Historic house in Nevada, United States

- U.S. National Register of Historic Places
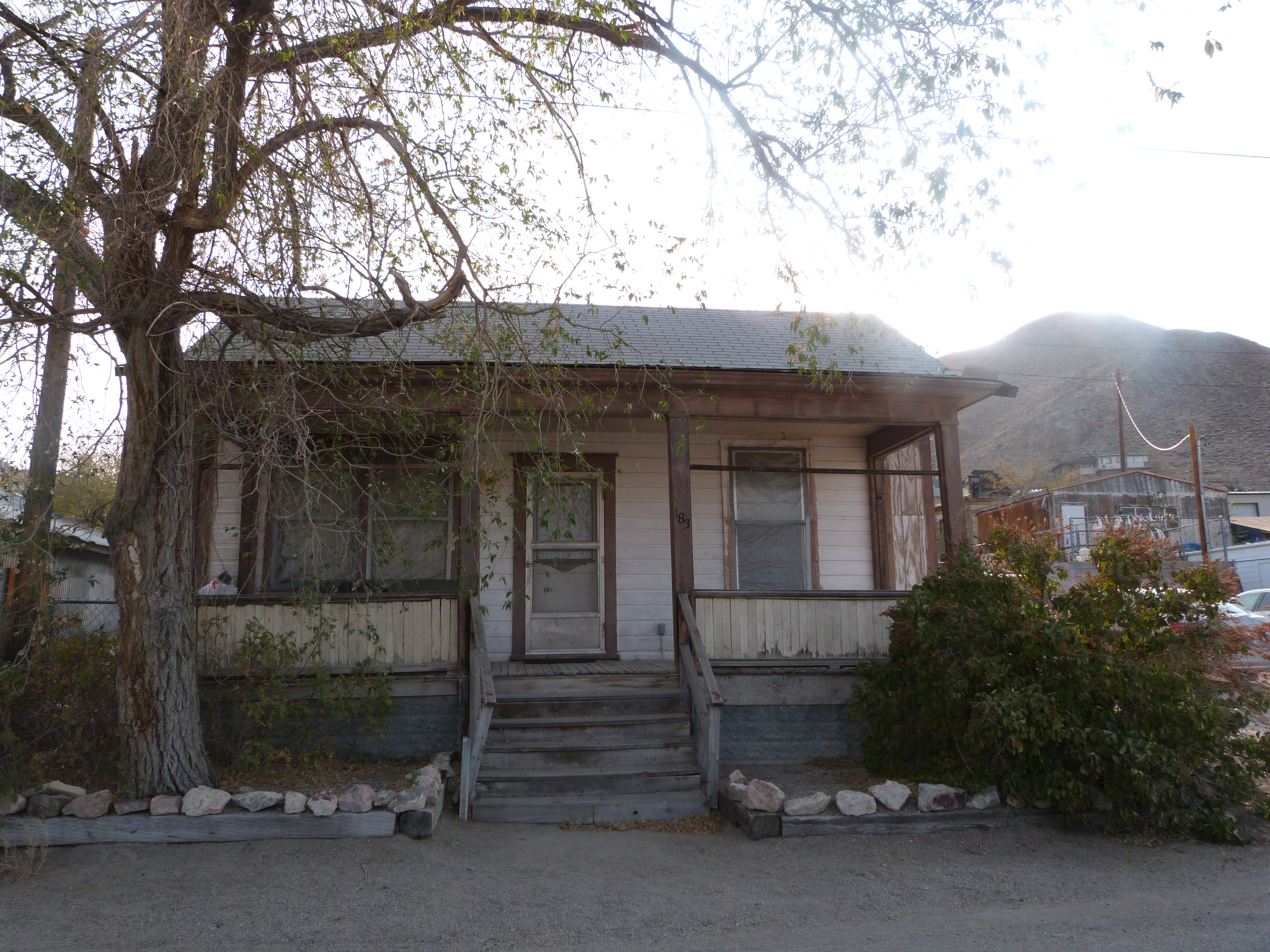
- Frame Cottage at 183 Prospect in Tonopah Nevada. It is on the National Register of Historic Places #82003230

- Location within Nevada Location within the United States
- Location: 183 Prospect St., Tonopah, Nevada
- Coordinates: 38.06621°N 117.23292°W
- Area: less than one acre
- Built: c. 1909
- MPS: Tonopah MRA
- NRHP reference No.: 82003230
- Added to NRHP: May 20, 1982

The Frame Cottage is a historic house located at 183 Prospect St. in Tonopah, Nevada. The wood-frame home was built c. 1909. The house features a gable roof with pediment-like gables, a porch with a pediment, classically influenced boxed eaves, and a symmetrical, T-shaped design. While frame houses were once common in Tonopah, the house is one of the few intact local examples of a frame home with a detailed design.

The house was added to the National Register of Historic Places on May 20, 1982.
