= Hugh H. Brown House =

Historic house in Nevada, United States

- U.S. National Register of Historic Places
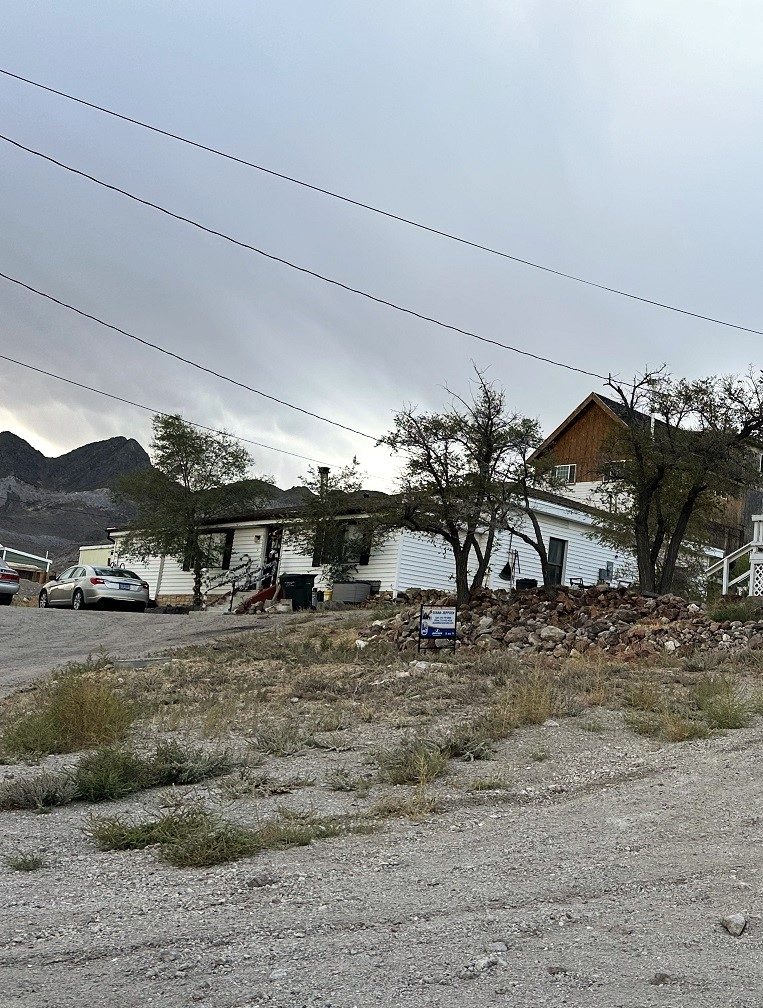
- The house in 2024

- Location within Nevada Location within the United States
- Location: 129 Ellis St.
- Nearest city: Tonopah, Nevada
- Coordinates: 38°3′53″N 117°13′50″W
- Area: less than one acre
- Built: 1906
- MPS: Tonopah MRA (AD)
- NRHP reference No.: 82000613
- Added to NRHP: October 13, 1982

The Hugh H. Brown House, near Tonopah, Nevada, United States, is a large adobe house that was built in 1906. It was listed on the National Register of Historic Places in 1982. It was deemed significant for its association with Tonopah attorney Hugh H. Brown.
