= Brokers Exchange =

- U.S. National Register of Historic Places
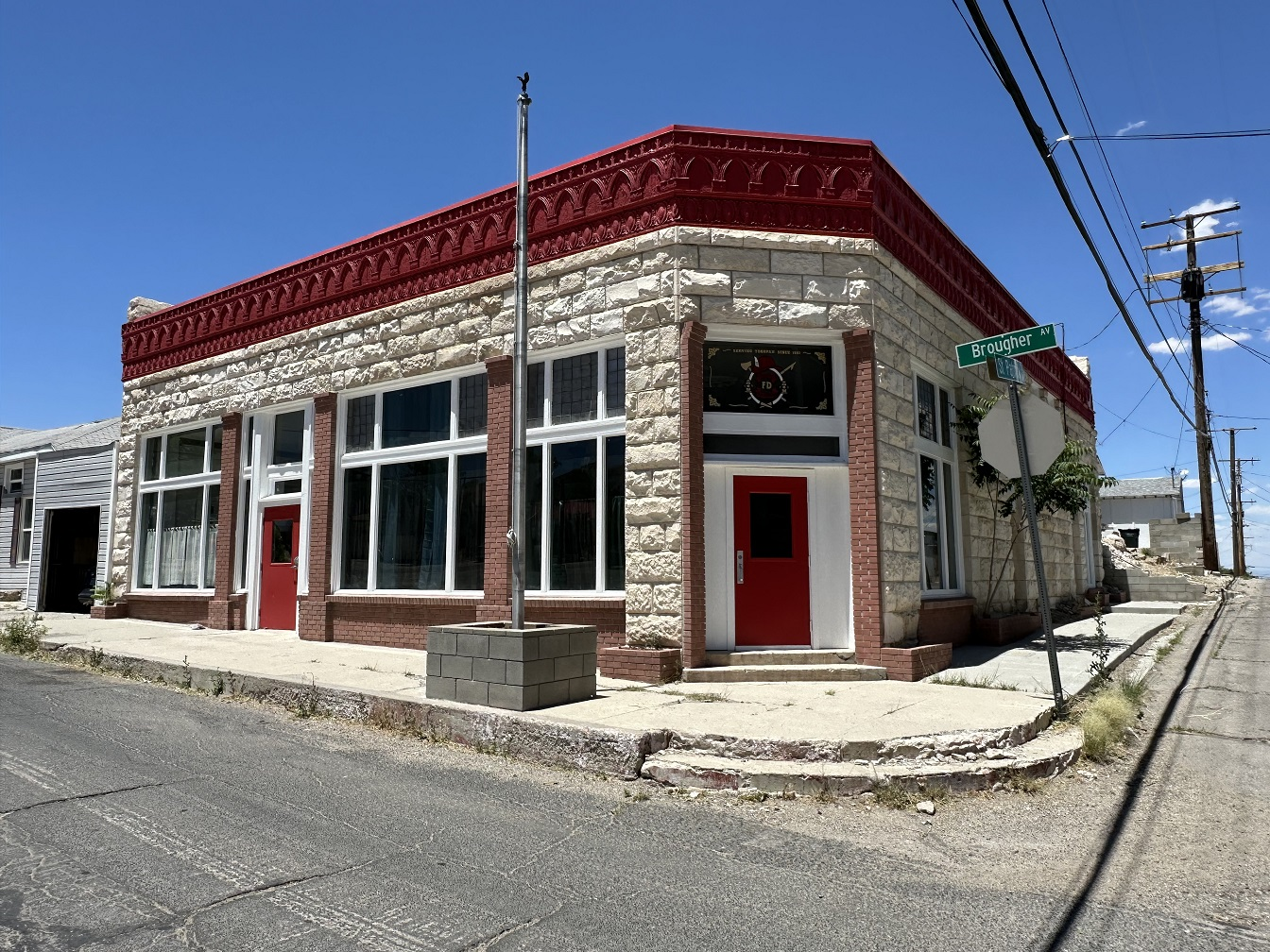
- Brokers Exchange in 2024

- Location within Nevada Location within the United States
- Location: 209–251 Brougher; Tonopah, Nevada
- Coordinates: 38.06805°N 117.23178°W
- Built: 1905
- Architect: Douglass, W.J.; Golden, Frank
- Architectural style: Gothic Revival
- MPS: Tonopah MRA
- NRHP reference No.: 82003221
- Added to NRHP: May 20, 1982

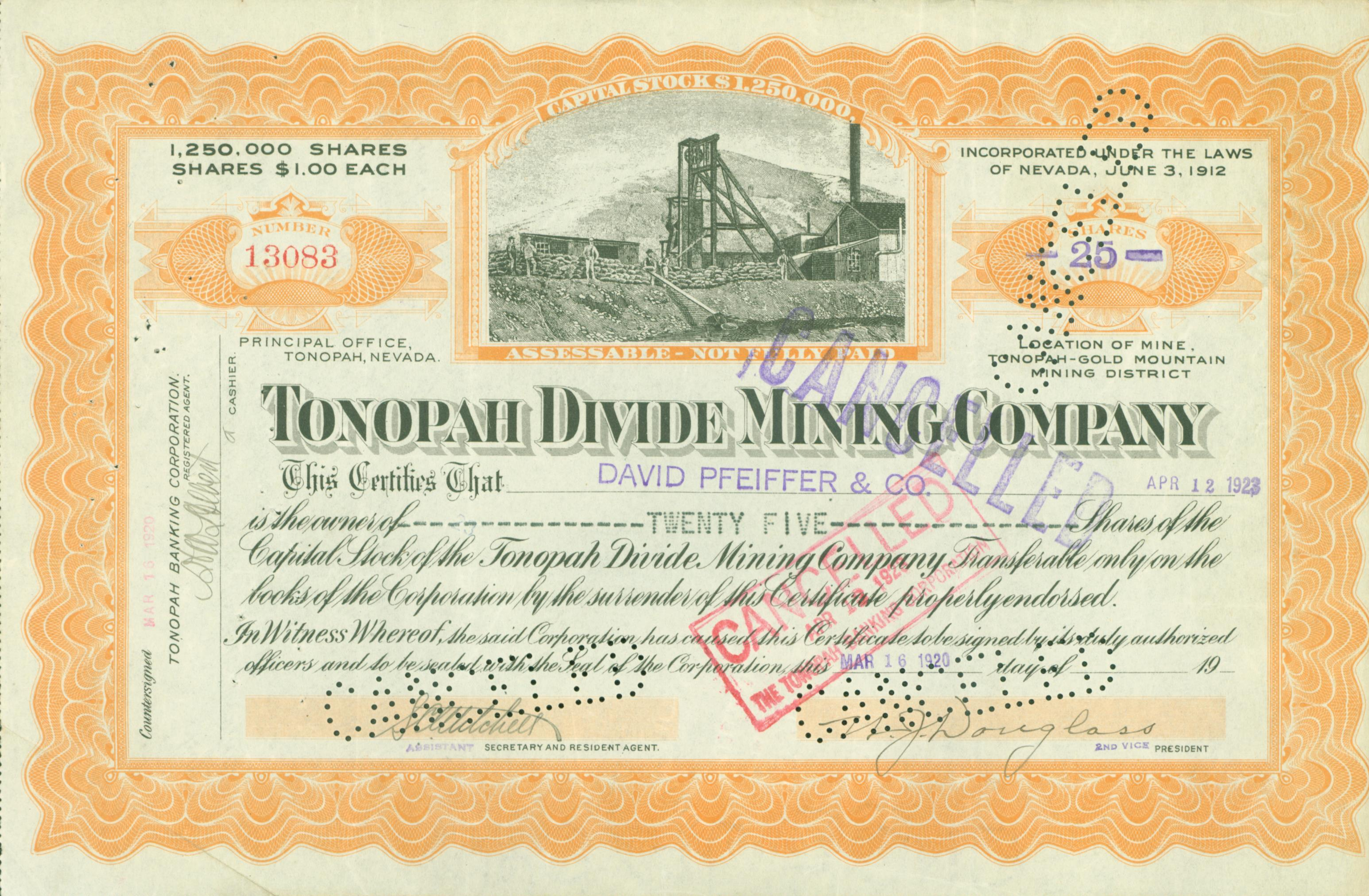
Share of the Tonopah Divide Mining Company, issued 16. March 1920

The Brokers Exchange in Tonopah, Nevada, also known as the Tonopah Divide Mining Company, was built in 1905 during Tonopah's mining boom. Originally a two-story building, it housed a brokerage, real estate office, and the offices of Tonopah lawyer (later United States Senator) Patrick McCarran. A fire destroyed the upper floor in 1912. The Tonopah Divide Mining Company, controlled by George Wingfield and Cal Brougher, purchased the property for use as an office in 1919. The ruined top story was removed and the first floor was re-roofed and capped with a decorate plaster frieze.

The building occupies a corner lot, with four storefront bays facing Brougher Avenue and a diagonal entrance at the corner of St. Patrick Street.
