= Tonopah Mining Company Cottage =

Historic house in Nevada, United States

- Tonapah Mining Company Cottage
- U.S. National Register of Historic Places
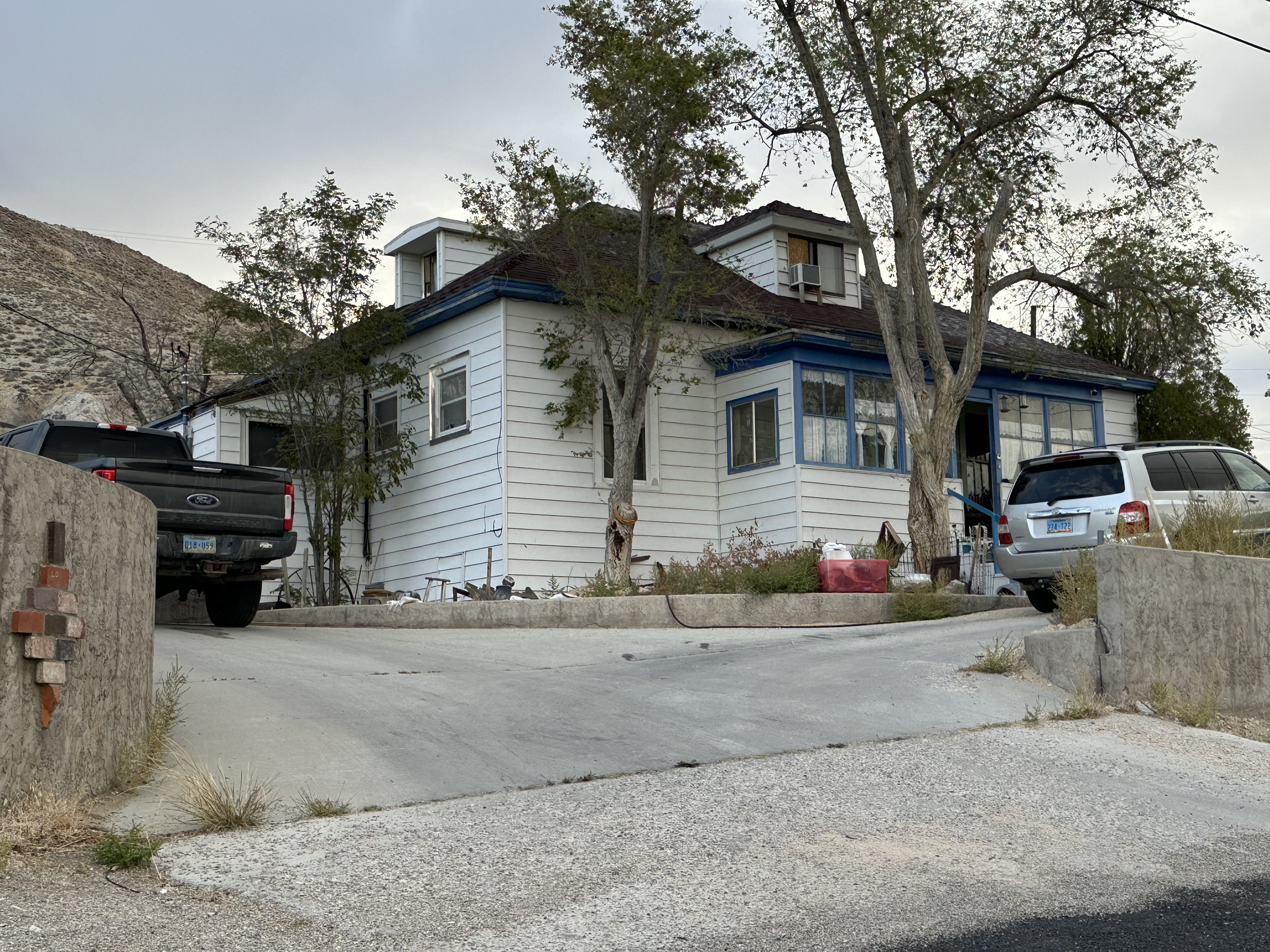
- Location: Queen St., Tonopah, Nevada
- Area: less than one acre
- Built: 1902
- MPS: Tonopah MRA
- NRHP reference No.: 82003250
- Added to NRHP: May 20, 1982

The Tonopah Mining Company Cottage is a historic house located on Queen Street in Tonopah, Nevada. Built in 1902, the home is one of the oldest frame houses in Tonopah. The house was constructed by the Tonopah Mining Company, the largest silver mining company in Tonopah. The cottage was the second home built for the company's employees and the oldest of the three surviving company houses built by the company.

The house was added to the National Register of Historic Places on May 20, 1982.
