= Campbell and Kelly Building =

Historic building in Tonopah, Nevada, US

- U.S. National Register of Historic Places
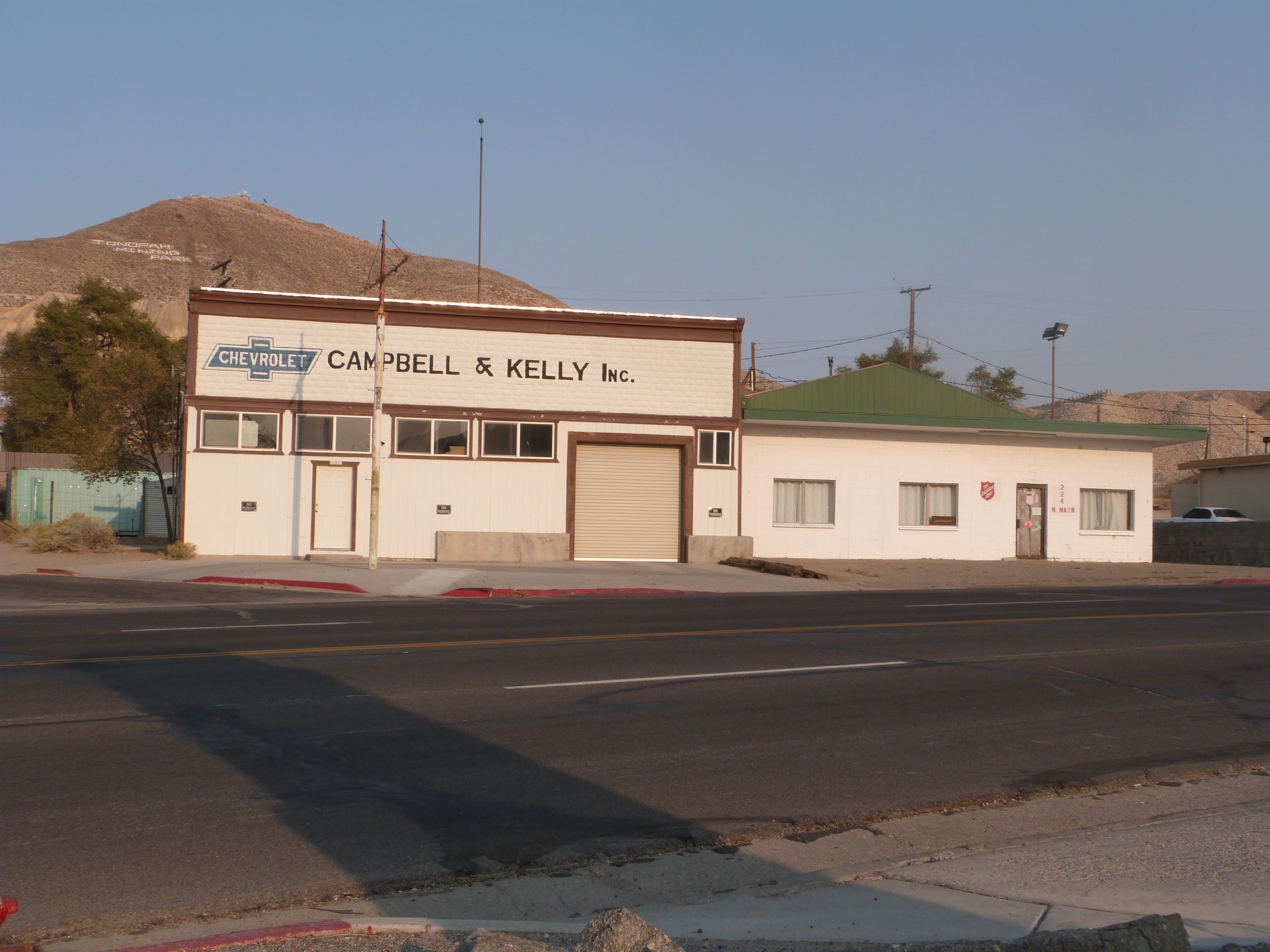
- Exterior view, 2020

- Location within Nevada Location within the United States
- Location: Corona and Main Street, Tonopah, Nevada
- Coordinates: 38°4′15″N 117°13′48″W
- Area: less than one acre
- Built: c.1912
- MPS: Tonopah MRA (AD)
- NRHP reference No.: 82000614
- Added to NRHP: October 13, 1982

The Campbell and Kelly Building, at Corona and Main Sts. in Tonopah, Nevada, is a historic building built c. 1912. It was listed on the National Register of Historic Places in 1982.

It was deemed significant for its commercial architecture as "a fine example of metal clad commercial construction with the original store fronts and other detailing still intact", and for its association with leading citizens H. P. Campbell and Rube Kelly, who developed machine works and foundry operations in Tonopah. This building was bought by them in 1915 to expand their automobile sales and service business.
