= E. R. Shields House =

Historic house in Nevada, United States

- U.S. National Register of Historic Places
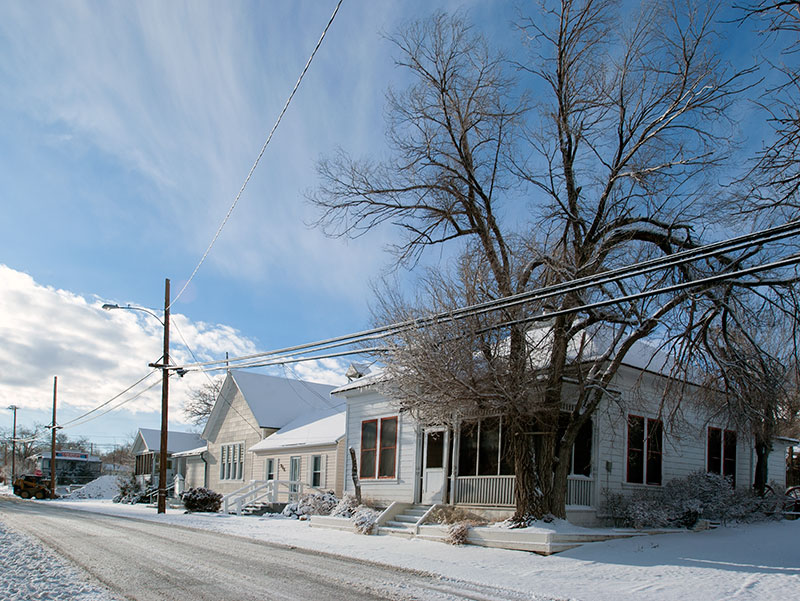

- Location within Nevada Location within the United States
- Location: 351 St. Patrick, Tonopah, Nevada
- Coordinates: 38.06579°N 117.22895°W
- Area: less than one acre
- Built: 1904
- Architectural style: Late Victorian, Neo-Colonial
- MPS: Tonopah MRA
- NRHP reference No.: 82003244
- Added to NRHP: May 20, 1982

The E. R. Shields House, at 351 St. Patrick in Tonopah, Nevada, United States, was built in 1904. It includes Late Victorian details in a largely "Neo-Colonial" design. It was listed on the National Register of Historic Places in 1982.

A survey of Nye County historic properties identified it as significant "for its architecture as one of the best preserved, well-crafted wood frame houses in Tonopah" and also for its association with Tonopah merchant E. R. Shields, who lived in Tonopah from 1902 to 1919.
