= Nye County Mercantile Company Building =

- U.S. National Register of Historic Places
- Location: 147 Main St., Tonopah, Nevada
- Area: less than one acre
- Built: 1905
- MPS: Tonopah MRA
- NRHP reference No.: 82003239
- Added to NRHP: May 20, 1982

The Nye County Mercantile Company Building is a historic building located at 147 Main St. in Tonopah, Nevada. The two-story concrete block building was constructed in 1905. While concrete blocks were a popular building material in the era, the building was one of the first in Tonopah to be built with the blocks. Businessman Henry C. Cutting built the building to house his mercantile business. Cutting opened the first mercantile business in Tonopah; he reorganized the business as the Nye County Mercantile Company when he constructed its new building.

The building was added to the National Register of Historic Places on May 20, 1982.
