= Frank Golden Block =

- U.S. National Register of Historic Places
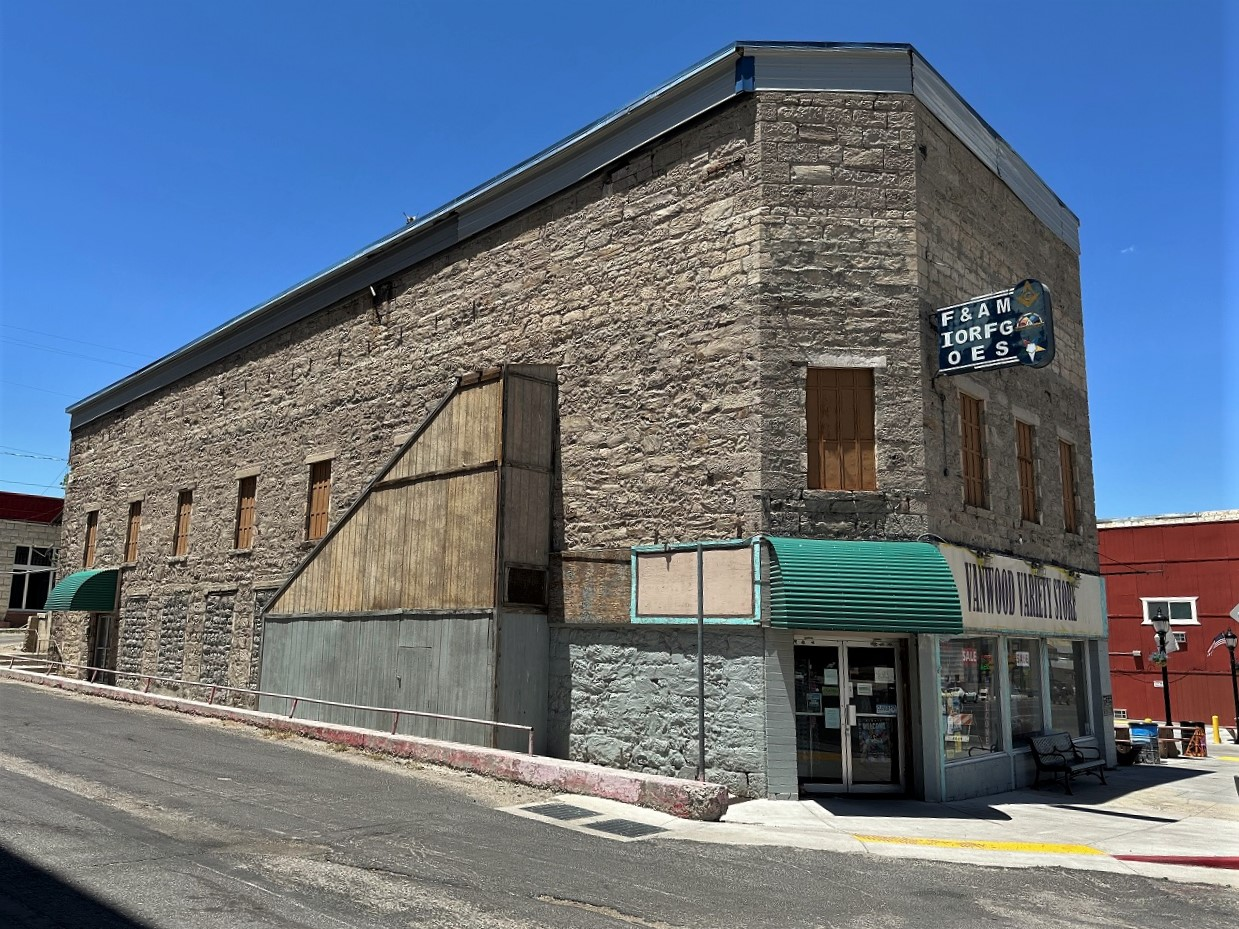
- Frank Golden Block in 2024

- Location within Nevada Location within the United States
- Location: Brougher and Main Sts. Tonopah, Nevada
- Area: less than one acre
- Built: 1902
- Built by: George E. Holesworth
- MPS: Tonopah MRA
- NRHP reference No.: 82003231
- Added to NRHP: May 20, 1982

The Frank Golden Block, at Brougher and Main Sts. in Tonopah, Nevada is a historic building that was built in 1902. It was listed on the National Register of Historic Places in 1982.

It was deemed significant "as the first substantial stone commercial building" built in Tonopah, for its association with businessman/banker Frank Golden, and for its architecture. It was designed and built by George E. Holesworth. Oddly, it is appreciated partly for its lack of style: "The building is unique for a large stone commercial structure as it lacks the application of any formal stylistic treatment. The absence of cut and dressed stonework or trim also suggests the lack of readily available stone craftsmen in Tonopah at the time of its construction."

The building was named for Frank Golden, who was a jeweler and businessman. He moved to Tonopah from Reno in 1901.
