= Nevada–California Power Company Substation and Auxiliary Power Building =

- U.S. National Register of Historic Places
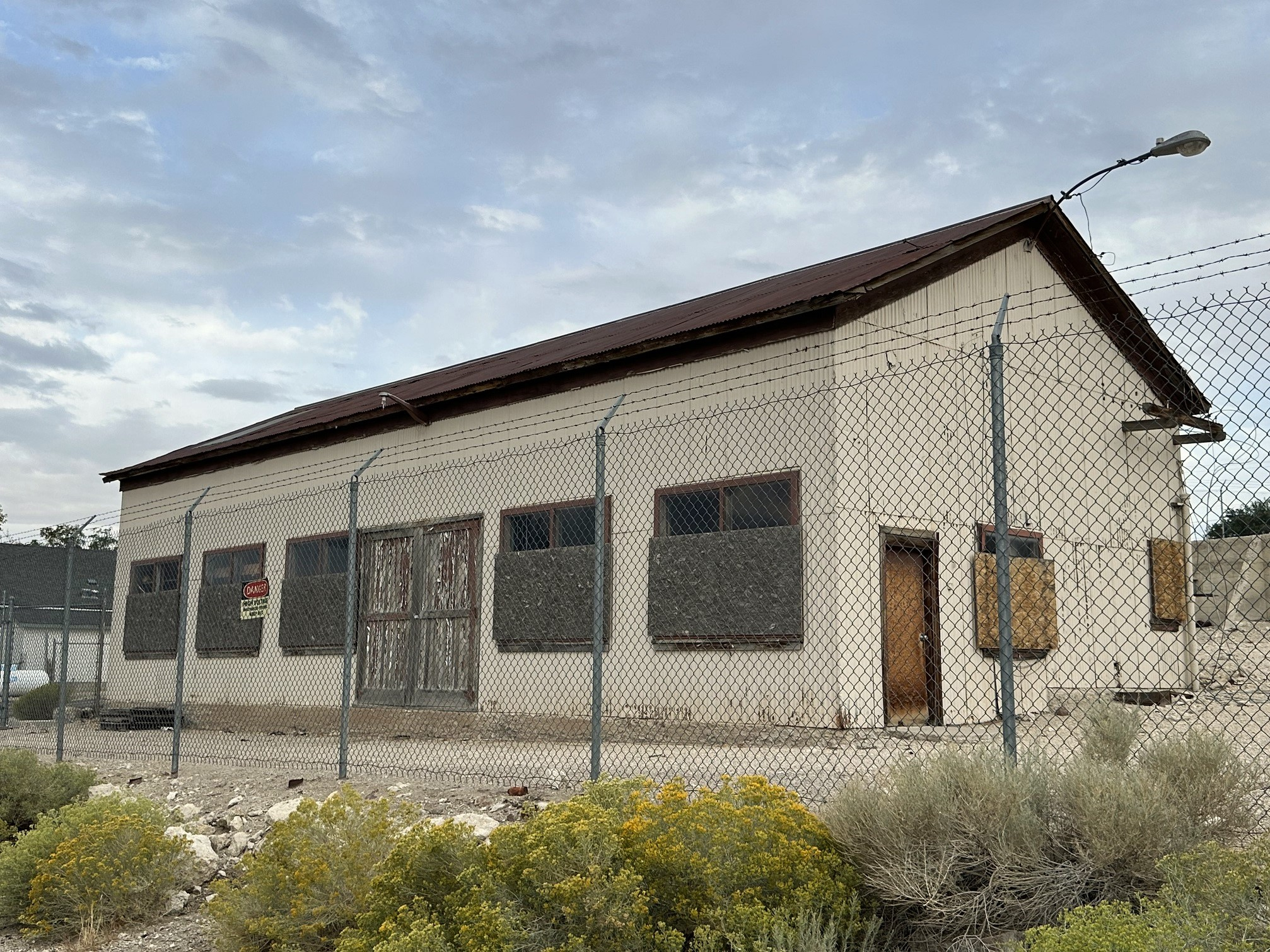

- Location within Nevada Location within the United States
- Location: Corner of Knapp and Cutting Sts., Tonopah, Nevada
- Coordinates: 38.06904972640066°N 117.2368103699172°W
- Built: 1905
- MPS: Tonopah MRA
- NRHP reference No.: 82003237
- Added to NRHP: July 26, 1982

The Nevada–California Power Company Substation and Auxiliary Power Building is an industrial building in Tonopah, Nevada. Built in 1905, it provided electricity to the town and the surrounding mine operations. The building was used by the Nevada–California Power Company, a predecessor of Southern California Edison.

The building was constructed with detailing befitting its significant role in the community.

The substation was listed on the National Register of Historic Places in 1982.
