= Tonopah Liquor Company Building =

- Tonapah Liquor Company Building
- U.S. National Register of Historic Places
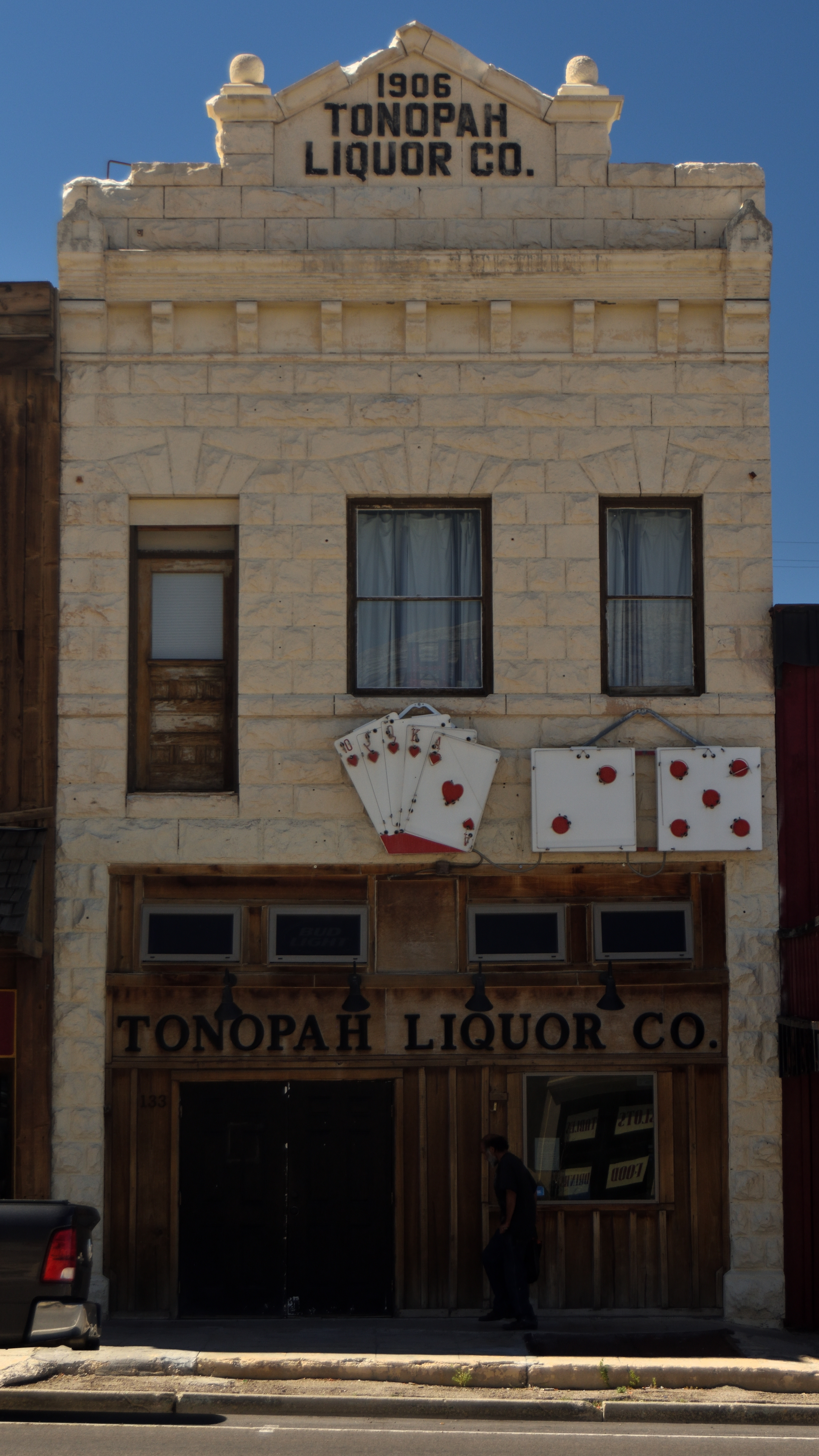
- Exterior view, September 2018

- Location within Nevada Location within the United States
- Location: Main St., Tonopah, Nevada
- Coordinates: 38.0685°N 117.23139°W
- Area: less than one acre
- Built: 1905
- Architectural style: Classical Revival
- MPS: Tonopah MRA
- NRHP reference No.: 82003249
- Added to NRHP: May 20, 1982

The Tonopah Liquor Company Building is a historic building located on Main St. in Tonopah, Nevada. The building was constructed in 1906 by the Tonopah Liquor Company. The stone building was designed in the Classical Revival style and features a large pediment with a stone cornice. While the building was one of many stone structures built in Tonopah's early history, it is now one of only four remaining in the town; a local historic survey claimed it to be the most well-crafted of the remaining buildings.

The building was added to the National Register of Historic Places on May 20, 1982.
