= Combellack Adobe Row House =

Historic house in Nevada, United States

- U.S. National Register of Historic Places
- Location within Nevada Location within the United States
- Location: Central St., Tonopah, Nevada
- Coordinates: 38.06868°N 117.23256°W
- Area: less than one acre
- Built: 1903
- Built by: Tonopah Extension Mining Co.
- MPS: Tonopah MRA
- NRHP reference No.: 82003226
- Added to NRHP: May 20, 1982

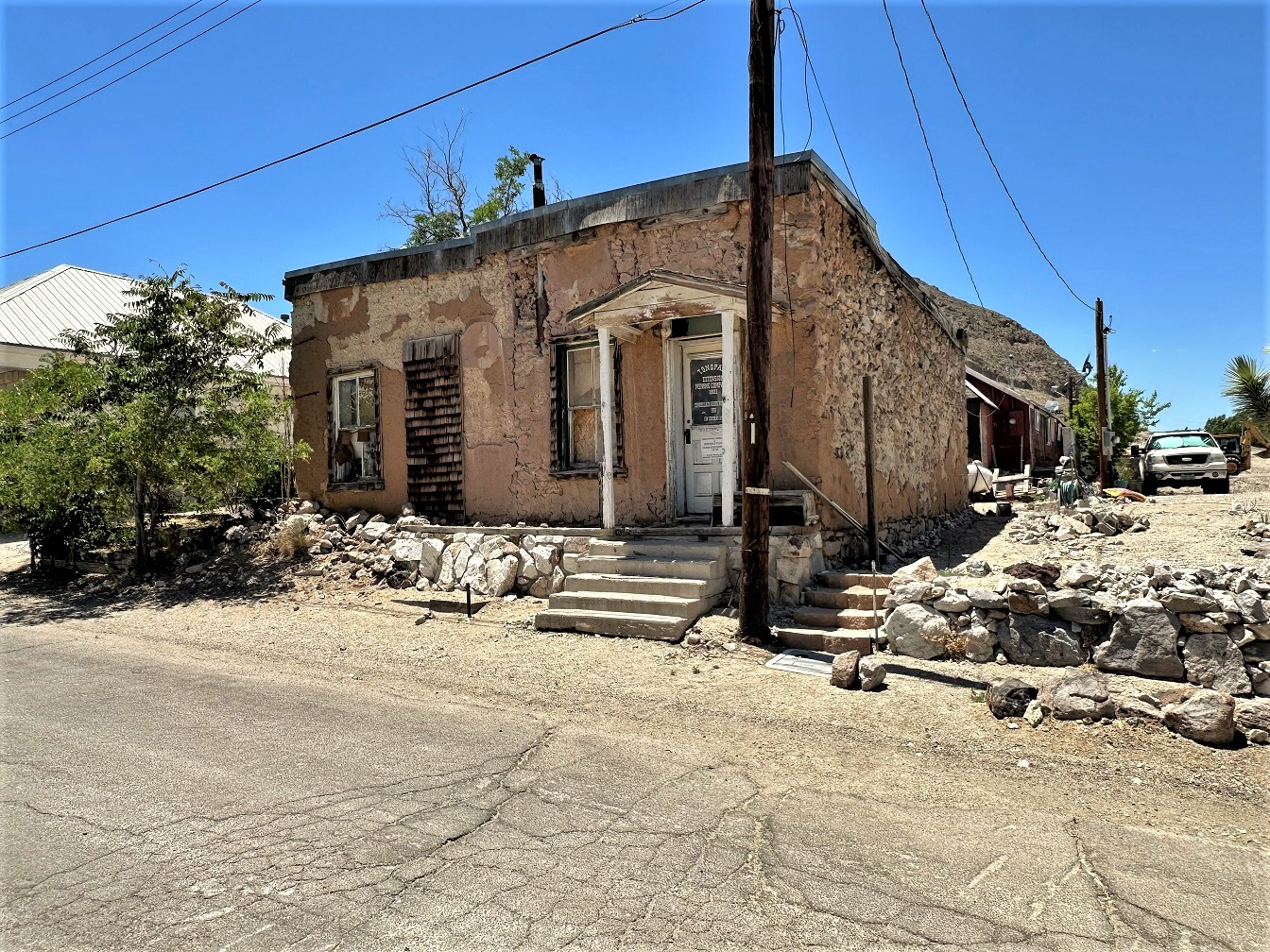

The Combellack Adobe Row House is an adobe row house located on Central Street in Tonopah, Nevada. The Tonopah Extension Mining Company built the home in 1903 to house its employees. The house is the oldest adobe home in Tonopah; its walls were cast in place rather than built in blocks, as the former method was more efficient and more popular in the town. The home was part of one of Tonopah's first residential areas on Central Street, which was a well-developed district by 1904. J.M. Combellack, who had lived in the home since it was built, became its owner in 1905.

The house was added to the National Register of Historic Places on May 20, 1982.
