= Dr. J.R. Masterson House =

Historic house in Nevada, United States

- Dr. J. R. Masterson House
- U.S. National Register of Historic Places
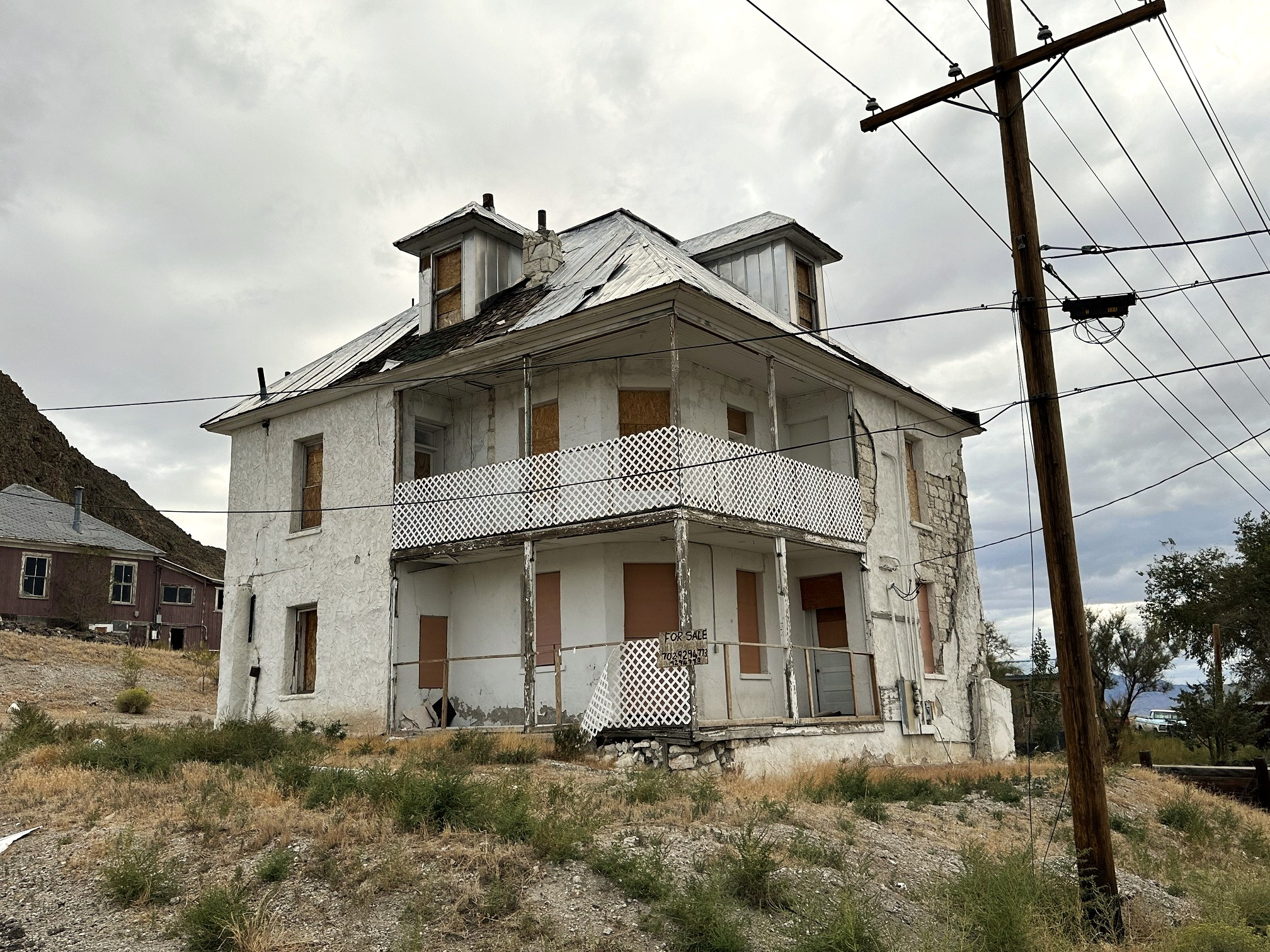

- Location within Nevada Location within the United States
- Location: Ohio Ave. and 2nd St., Tonopah, Nevada
- Coordinates: 38.06913°N 117.23817°W
- Area: less than one acre
- Built: 1908
- Built by: Golden, James
- MPS: Tonopah MRA
- NRHP reference No.: 82003234
- Added to NRHP: May 20, 1982

The Dr. J. R. Masterson House, at Ohio Ave. and 2nd St. in Tonopah, Nevada, is a 35-by-35-foot (11 m × 11 m) stone and frame historic building that was built in 1908. It has also been known as the Fred Chapman House. It was built as a residence and later served as a rooming house for most of its existence. It was a work of James Golden. It was listed on the National Register of Historic Places in 1982.

At the time of its NRHP listing, it was the largest stone residence in Tonopah. In addition, the house was deemed significant also for its association with physician J.R. Masterson between 1914 and 1920, with mining engineer Fred Chapman between 1923 and 1945, and with Judge William Hatton who boarded there.
