= William H. Berg House =

Historic house in Nevada, United States

- U.S. National Register of Historic Places
- Location within Nevada Location within the United States
- Location: Mariposa and Davis Sts., Round Mountain, Nevada
- Coordinates: 38°42′38″N 117°4′5″W
- Area: 0.2 acres (0.081 ha)
- Built: 1914–15
- Built by: William H. Berg
- Architectural style: Concrete block construction
- NRHP reference No.: 84002076
- Added to NRHP: January 11, 1984

The William H. Berg House is a historic house located at the intersection of Mariposa and Davis Streets in Round Mountain, Nevada, United States. The house was built from 1914 to 1915 by William H. Berg. Berg built the house with concrete blocks, a popular building material at the time due to their cheapness and durability. The house's root cellar, which Berg built to store produce from his ranch, was built with glass bottles embedded in concrete. The property also includes an addition and an ice house. Berg, who was one of the first residents of Round Mountain, lived in the house until his death.

The house was added to the National Register of Historic Places on January 11, 1984.
