= Tonopah Public Library =

Coordinates: 38.0669°N 117.2316°W

- U.S. National Register of Historic Places
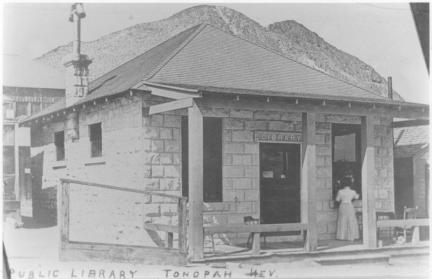

- Location within Nevada Location within the United States
- Location: 171 Central, Tonopah, Nevada
- Area: less than one acre
- Built: 1906
- Architect: Hill, John J.
- MPS: Tonopah MRA
- NRHP reference No.: 82003252
- Added to NRHP: May 20, 1982

The Tonopah Public Library in Tonopah, Nevada was the third public library in Nevada.The one story stone building was designed by John J. Hill and was completed in 1906. The library was established by local residents Grace R. Moore and Marjorie Moore Brown to house a gift of 200 books from George F. Weeks.

The library is built of dressed ashlar masonry and measures 38 feet (12 m) long by 28 feet (8.5 m) wide. Cornerstones to either side of the main facade read "Erected, 1906" and "John J. Hill, Builder", while the word "Library" is centered over the lintel of the front door. The library's collection was donated in memory of George Weeks' brother J.R., whose funeral was reputedly the first in Tonopah.

The library was placed on the National Register of Historic Places in 1982.
