= Benson Dillon Billinghurst =

American educator

B.D. Billinghurst
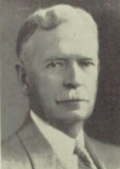
- Billinghurst in 1922
- Born: Benson Dillon Billinghurst; August 15, 1869; McArthur, Ohio, U.S.
- Died: December 3, 1935 (aged 66); Reno, Nevada, U.S.
- Education: Ohio Wesleyan University (B.A.); University of Washington (LL.B.); University of Nevada (LL.D., honorary)
- Occupation: Educator
- Years active: 1908–1935
- Title: Superintendent of Washoe County School District, Nevada

Benson Dillon Billinghurst (August 15, 1869 – December 3, 1935), often known using his initials as B.D. Billinghurst, was an American educator in Nevada during the early 20th century. Born in Ohio in 1869, he served as the Superintendent of Schools of the Washoe County School District from 1908 until his death in 1935, and was famous for his school building projects, his expansion of the availability and quality of Reno education, the introduction of junior high schools to Nevada, and his influence in education laws and the establishment of the Nevada State Textbook Commission.

== Biography ==
Billinghurst received a Bachelor of Arts from Ohio Wesleyan University, and a Bachelor of Laws from University of Washington.

His first known academic position was as a teacher from 1897 to 1900. In 1908, Billinghurst took the position of Superintendent of Schools of Washoe County. He arrived at a school system that was rather undeveloped, and set to work improving it. Less than a year after assuming his new role, Billinghurst negotiated $100,000 ($2,631,579 in 2015 dollars) construct two new elementary schools in Reno, then a city of around 10,000 people. He described his vision for the schools as:

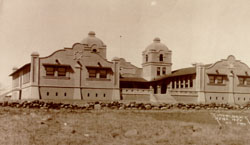
The newly constructed Mount Rose School in 1913.

"...modern and sanitary, eight classrooms and a large assembly room on one floor. A domestic science room for the girls, and a manual arts training room for the boys, are placed in the basement. The assembly hall is 40 feet wide and 80 feet long, including a stage on one end, lighted by electricity, with two sets of scenery. A mechanical fan system of heating and cooling is provided."

The two buildings were very similar in structure, built in the Mission Revival style, with which Billinghurst was enamored. Designed by the architect George A. Ferris, the schools were one story, with three sides of classrooms centered around a courtyard, within which was a fountain with a flagpole jutting out. The new McKinley Park School was located between Keystone and Vine Streets, and the Orvis Ring School was on the corner of East 7th Street and Evans Avenue. Libby Booth was chosen as the first Principal of Orvis Ring School. The new schools were not only necessary, they were modern and state-of-the-art at the time: a 1909 Nevada State Journal article wrote that the auditorium stage "lit with real electric lamps" and the "central air system, with thermostats in each room."

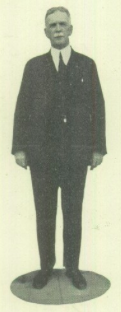
Benson Dillon Billinghurst in 1922.

A year later, construction began on two more one-story Mission Revival school buildings, both also designed by Ferris. At a cost of $250,000 ($6,250,000 in 2015 dollars), the two new schools were completed in 1911. The two buildings were similar in size and design to McKinley Park and Orvis Ring, but of more elaborate decoration, with large Moorish-style domed towers framing their entrances. The new Mary S. Doten School, named after the famous Nevada educator and suffragette Mary S. Doten, was located on Washington and West 5th Street. Its first principal was Echo Loder. The new Mount Rose School, located on Lander and La Rue Streets, was later expanded by Lehman Ferris, George Ferris' son.

The four new schools, later known as the 'Four Sisters' or the 'Spanish Quartet,' became a defining architectural focal points of Reno and preeminent examples of Mission Revival architecture in Nevada.

While Billinghurst was known to have admired Mission architecture, another reason was brought up for choosing the style. The Nevada State Superintendent of Public Instruction reported to the 27th Session of the Nevada Legislature that the Mission style is "especially adapted to one-story structures " and that "there is nothing better for school purposes than one-story buildings. The one-story plan eliminates the stair climbing so destructive to the nervous strength of pupils and teachers, and also renders danger from fire impossible."

Under Billinghurst's leadership, Washoe County was the first in the state to introduce middle schools, and in 1930, B.D. Billinghurst Middle School was established and named in his honor, one of five such middle schools established during his superintendency. He was also associated with educational reforms such as the establishment of the Nevada State Textbook Commission, laws providing free textbooks for public school students, compulsory attendance laws, laws requiring medical examination of public school students, education finance laws, and improvement in Nevada public school curriculum. He was also a lecturer on educational matters at the University of Nevada, Reno, from which he later received an honorary Legum Doctor.

Washoe County was the largest and best-financed school district in Nevada during Billinghurst's administration, and the programs he implemented were ahead of their time, implemented later by other districts. In 1933, the United States Office of Education rated Nevada's schools second in the nation, with only New York ahead of them. A seasoned member of the National Education Association, Billinghurst was well known in education circles, often consulted by educators from across the nation regarding their own schools and districts, as well as by lawmakers and governors, who considered his advice when introducing new legislation or reforming education programs.

== Billinghurst House ==
Constructed in 1910, the Benson Billinghurst House was constructed by B.D. Billinghurst as a personal residence, a bungalow with varnished pine finishes.
