= International Hotel =

International Hotel may refer to:

- International Hotel (Alanya, Turkey), a historical hotel building
- International Hotel (San Francisco), a residential hotel, historic building and community center in San Francisco, California
- International Hotel (Virginia City), a hotel that operated from 1860 to 1914 in Virginia City, Nevada
  - International Hotel (Austin, Nevada), a historic building created from part of the Virginia City hotel
- The former name of the Westgate Las Vegas Resort & Casino
