= State Bank and Trust Company Building =

- State Bank and Trust Company
- U.S. National Register of Historic Places
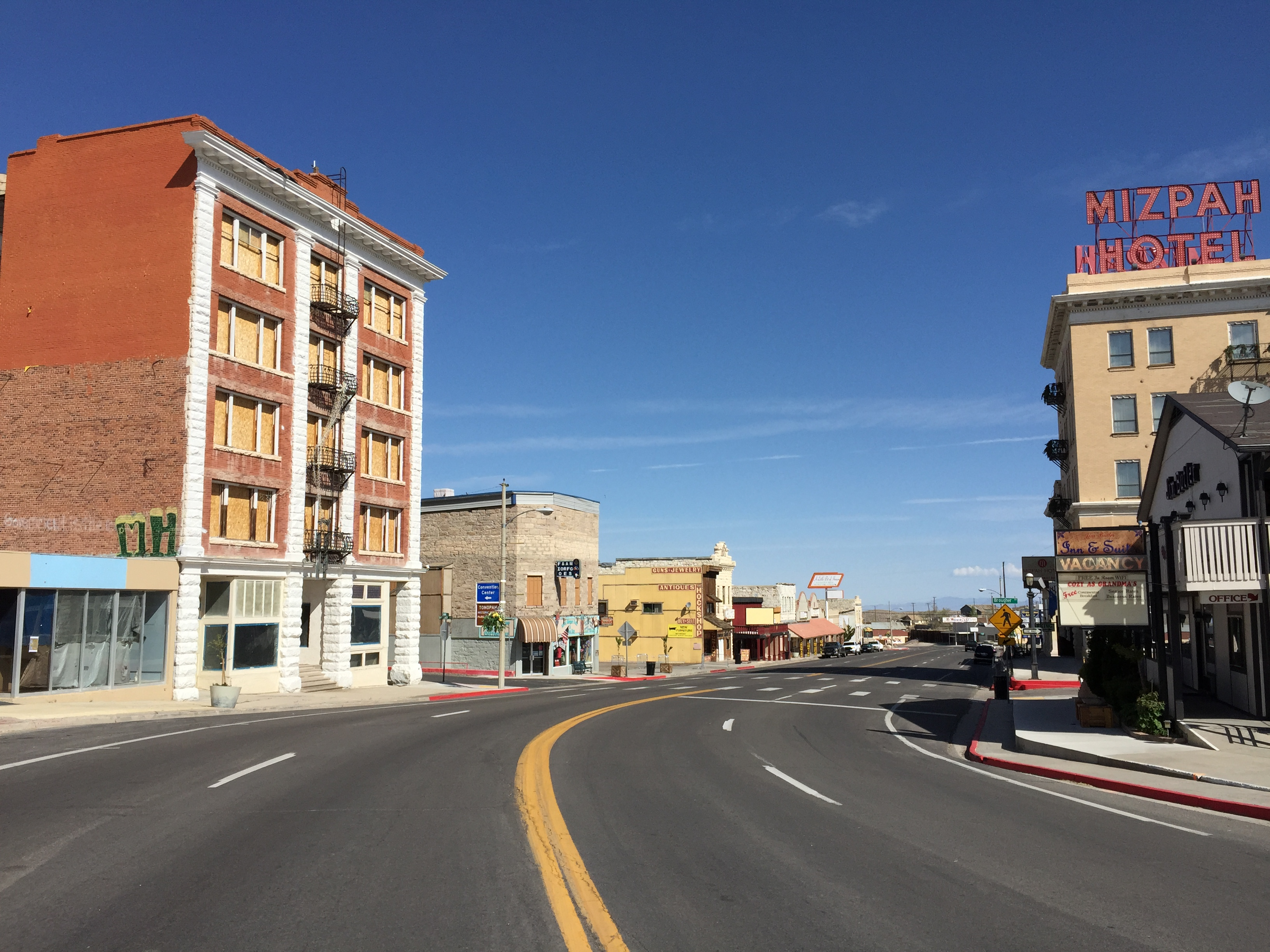
- State Bank and Trust Company Building (left)

- Location within Nevada Location within the United States
- Location: 102 Brougher, Tonopah, Nevada
- Coordinates: 38.06791°N 117.23127°W
- Area: less than one acre
- Built: 1906
- Architect: Holesworth, George E.
- Architectural style: Classical Revival
- MPS: Tonopah MRA
- NRHP reference No.: 82003247
- Added to NRHP: May 20, 1982

The State Bank and Trust Company Building, more commonly known as the Belvada, is a historic bank building located at 102 Brougher Avenue in Tonopah, Nevada. The building was constructed in 1906 for the State Bank and Trust Company, a local bank founded in 1902. Architect George E. Holesworth designed the building in the Classical Revival style. Holesworth's design features granite pilasters separating the building's bays, a dentillated metil cornice with modillions along the roof, and an egg-and-dart cornice at the top of the first floor. The bank moved into the building in June 1907, but it only occupied it for four months. The bank had lent the L.M. Sullivan Trust Company, a land speculating company, a large sum, and when the company failed, the bank did as well. In 1908, the Nevada Club Saloon opened in the building; it was joined by the First National Bank of Nevada later in the year. The five-story building and the nearby Mizpah Hotel, also five stories, were the tallest buildings in the state until 1927.

The building was added to the National Register of Historic Places on May 20, 1982. The Belvada served as an apartment building in the 1980s, but was eventually closed.

As of 2018, the Belvada was owned by the Cline family, which was working to renovate the building. The Clines also owned the Mizpah Hotel, which they renovated as well. The Belvada was stripped of its interior and rebuilt, eventually reopening as the Belvada Hotel on December 28, 2020.
