= El Cortez =

El Cortez or El Cortez Hotel may refer to:

Places

- El Cortez (Las Vegas), also known as El Cortez Hotel and Casino, in Las Vegas, Nevada, opened in 1941 and listed on the National Register of Historic Places (NRHP)
- El Cortez (Reno), also known as El Cortez Hotel, in Reno, Nevada, opened in 1931, NRHP-listed
- El Cortez (San Diego), also known as El Cortez Hotel, a former hotel in San Diego, California, NRHP-listed

Other

- El Cortez (film), a film released in 2006, starring Lou Diamond Phillips
