= Buckhorn, Nevada =

- Ghost town
- Location within the state of Nevada Buckhorn (the United States)
- Coordinates: 40°10′34″N 116°28′50″W
- Country: United States
- State: Nevada
- County: Eureka
- Elevation: 6,453 ft (1,967 m)
- Time zone: UTC-8 (Pacific (PST))
  - Summer (DST): UTC-7 (PDT)

Buckhorn is a ghost town in Eureka County, state of Nevada, in the United States.

== History ==
In the winter of 1908 gold ore was discovered by five prospectors in the place which became Buckhorn. These prospectors sold their claim to mining magnate George Wingfield who formed the "Buckhorn Company" in 1910 and started the mining activities. The Post Office was in operation from February 1910 until May 1916. In 1914, 300 people lived in Buckhorn. However, the Buckhorn veins were weaker than expected and production dropped in 1914 and 1915. The mine closed in 1917 and was reopened in 1935, but the results were weak yet again, and thus the mine was closed once more. Nowadays, the only remains of the old town are the mill foundations.

The population was 3 in 1940.
