= Lander County High School =

- U.S. National Register of Historic Places
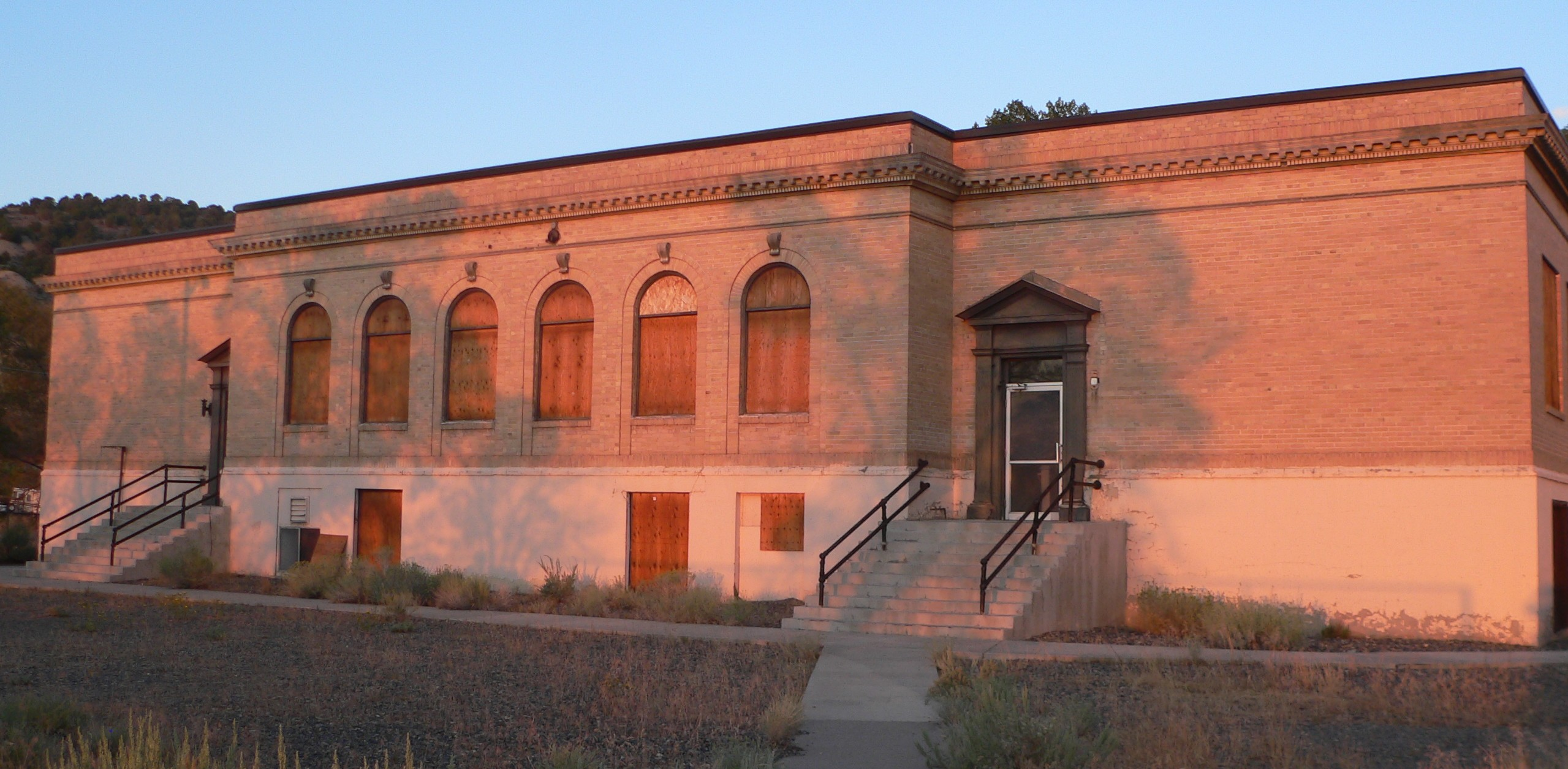
- View from the west, near sunset

- Location within Nevada Location within the United States
- Location: 130 Sixth St., Austin, Nevada
- Coordinates: 39°29′37″N 117°04′08″W
- Area: 3.9 acres (1.6 ha)
- Built: 1926
- Architect: Ferris, George A., and Son; Et al.
- Architectural style: Renaissance, Palazzo Style
- NRHP reference No.: 00000821
- Added to NRHP: July 20, 2000

The Lander County High School, at 130 Sixth St. in Austin, Nevada, is a two-story concrete and brick school building built in 1926 with a connected, matching gymnasium that was built in 1928. It was designed by Reno, Nevada architects George A. Ferris and Son. It was built originally as a K-12 combined school, built from proceeds of a $55,000 bond. It has since also been known as Austin High School and, in 1999, as Austin Elementary School. It was listed on the National Register of Historic Places in 2000; the listing included both buildings as contributing buildings.

Both buildings in the complex are symmetrical and have an "ordered appearance drawn from an Italian Renaissance-Palazzo style, and both are constructed predominantly of a warm golden-buff or sandstone colored brick with shaped galvanized iron dentil detailed cornices running around the majority of the buildings' exteriors."

The complex is included within the area of the 1971-NRHP-listed Austin Historic District, listed as a gold rush-era mining community, but was not 50 years old and was not considered a contributing property in that district.
