= Carson City Civic Auditorium =

- U.S. National Register of Historic Places
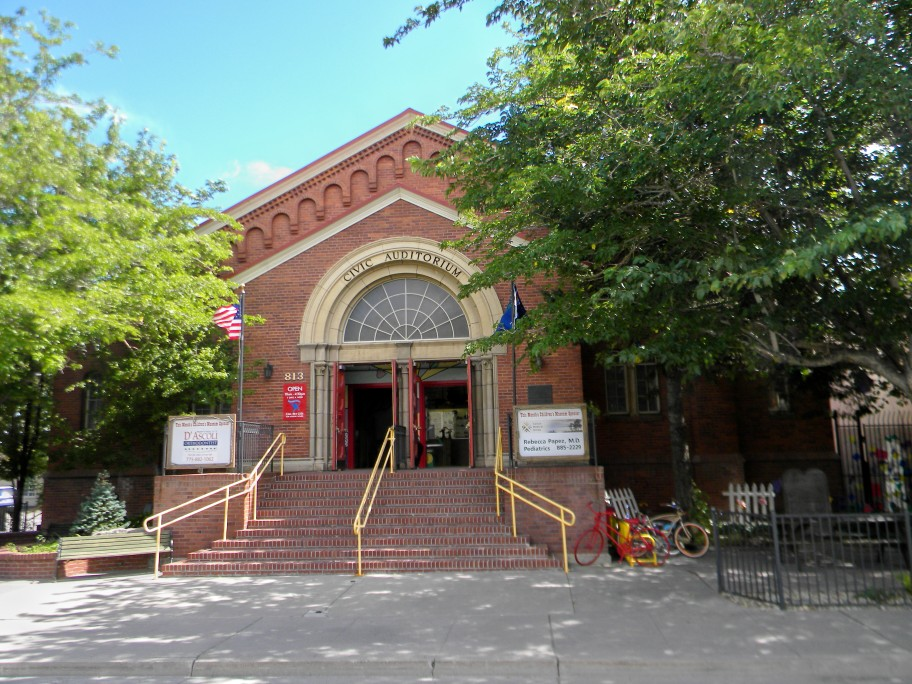

- Location within Nevada Location within the United States
- Location: 813 N. Carson St., Carson City, Nevada
- Coordinates: 39°9′36″N 119°45′19″W
- Area: less than one acre
- Built: 1939
- Built by: Dressler, H.L.
- Architect: Ferris, Lehman A.
- Architectural style: Romanesque Revival
- NRHP reference No.: 90000912
- Added to NRHP: June 19, 1990

The Carson City Civic Auditorium, at 813 N. Carson St. in Carson City, Nevada, was designed by architect Lehman A. Ferris and was built during 1938–39. It was funded by a municipal bond and by the Public Works Administration. Also known simply as Municipal Auditorium, it was listed on the National Register of Historic Places in 1990. Since 1994, the building has served as the location for the Children's Museum of Northern Nevada.

It was deemed significant as a depression era works project and also "as a rare example of a monumentally-scaled Romanesque Revival-styled building in Nevada".

== History ==
The location of the building previously served as the National Guard Armory, which was repurposed by the American Legion as a fraternal hall. However, a fire broke out and burned the building down in the mid-1930s. In the following years, the idea to build a community hall gained traction, and shortly afterward, a proposal for the Carson City Civic Auditorium received funding from the New Deal program. Lehman A. Ferris was appointed as the architect in 1938, and by 1939, Herb Louis Dressler constructed and completed the building.

Carson City Civic Auditorium served as a public entertainment venue and banquet hall until 1983. From 1965 to 1971, the basement area also housed the Carson City Library.

=== Children’s Museum of Northern Nevada ===
The Children's Museum of Northern Nevada started operating from Carson City's Civic Auditorium in 1994. The museum provides interactive exhibitions in art, science, and humanities for children.

== Structure ==
The building's original structure contained: a stage, a dance floor, and seating area, a basement banquet hall, cloakrooms, and dressing rooms.
