= Mapes Hotel =

Hotel casino in Reno, Nevada

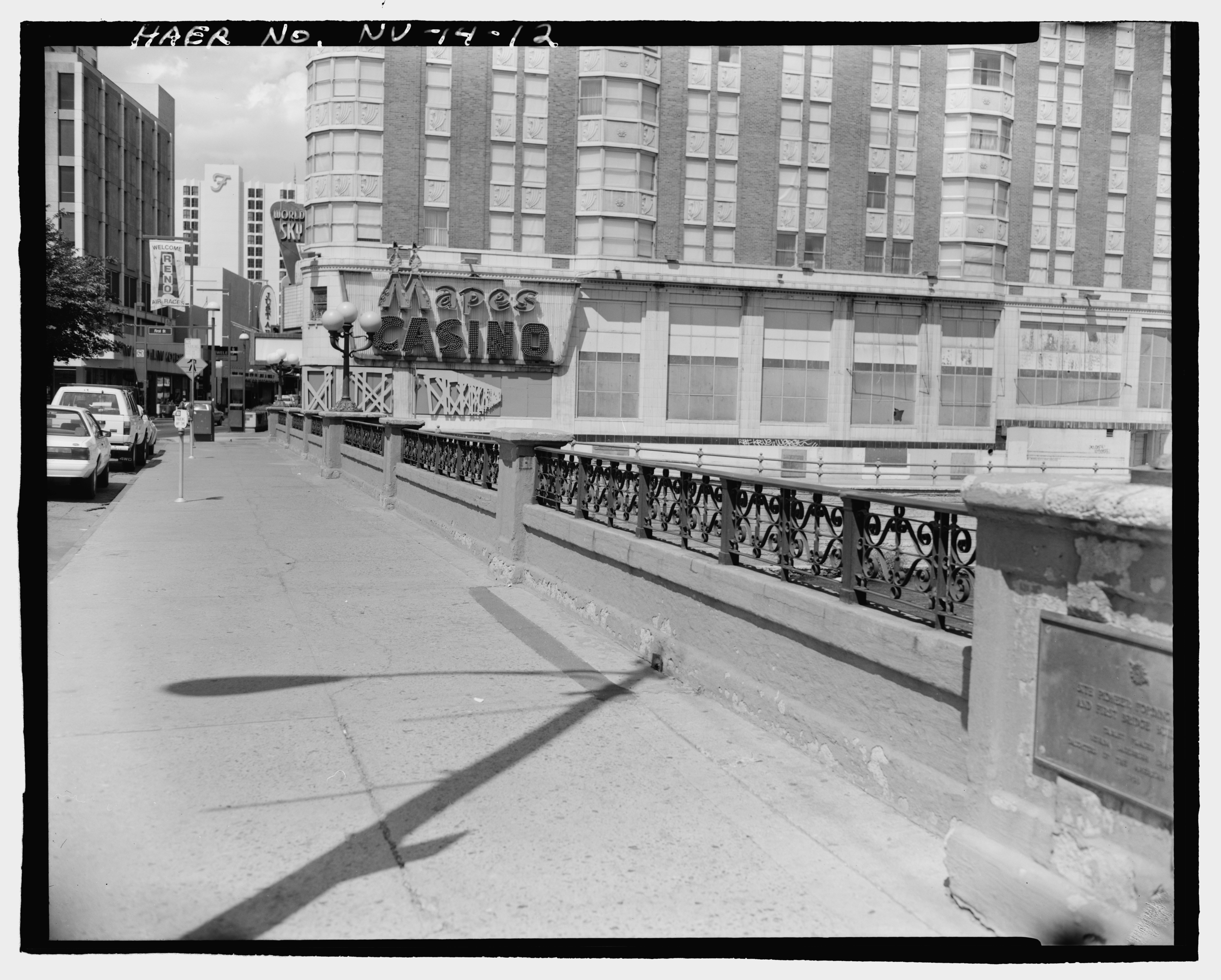
- Interactive map of Mapes Hotel
- Location: Reno, Nevada, U.S.; 10 North Virginia Street; 39.52566°N 119.812576°W
- Opened: December 17, 1947; 78 years ago
- Closed: December 17, 1982; 43 years ago
- Owner: Charles Mapes Jr.

The Mapes Hotel was a hotel and casino located in Downtown Reno, Nevada, next to the Truckee River on Virginia Street. It was built in 1947 and opened on December 17 of that year. It was the first skyscraper built in the Western United States since the start of World War II. Built in a distinctive Art Deco style, the hotel was a unique high-rise built to combine a hotel and casino, providing the prototype for modern hotel/casinos.

== History ==
When it opened in 1947, the 12-story Mapes Hotel was the tallest building in Nevada until the 1956 opening of the Fremont Hotel and Casino in Las Vegas. Owned by the Mapes family, the hotel quickly became, for most of the 1950s and 1960s, the premier hotel in Reno.

The Mapes thrived throughout the 1960s and mid 1970s but began to face problems competing with more modern casino/hotels in Reno in the late 1970s and early 1980s. The Mapes casino closed on December 17, 1982, because of financial difficulties the Mapes family faced after the recession of 1981, and the failure of their other family owned casino in Reno, the Money Tree. The building was allowed to decay as many different owners took possession of the building with plans to revive the casino/hotel, all of which failed. Finally, the Reno Redevelopment Agency took possession of the Mapes hotel building in 1996.

Despite being listed on the National Register of Historic Places as a "Most Endangered Site", the National Historic Trust would not offer any help to the City of Reno in their preservation efforts. The City brought in many groups and engineers to make an attempt to save the building, even asking Artspace Projects, Inc to do an analysis of the building. This company eventually refurbished the Riverside Hotel across the street from the Mapes. Every engineering report came to the conclusion that the Mapes was actually poorly constructed and there was no hope in restoring the building. In light of all the evidence, and in the face of much local protest, the City of Reno contracted for the demolition of the Mapes on Super Bowl Sunday, January 30, 2000.

Nothing was done with the Mapes lot until the winter of 2001, when a winter ice rink was put in at the site. The ice rink was set up at the site each winter until 2004, when a park was temporarily put on the lot. Currently, the former Mapes site has been made into a permanent outdoor skating rink, along with a park, and elaborate art displays from Burning Man.

== Entertainment history ==
In 1960, the hotel was used to film The Misfits, starring Marilyn Monroe, Montgomery Clift and Clark Gable, directed by John Huston and written by Arthur Miller. The supporting cast included Thelma Ritter and Eli Wallach. They also stayed at the hotel while filming. It would be Monroe and Gable's last film to be finished and released during their lifetimes. Photographer Henri Cartier-Bresson was in attendance at the press opening. There is an iconic sequence with the Mapes Hotel in the background when Monroe crosses the Old Virginia Street Bridge in Downtown Reno.

Many celebrities of that era stayed there, including U.S. Senator Joseph McCarthy, who over a drink in the Lamplighter bar at the bottom floor of the hotel, admitted to a reporter that he did not have a list of communists in America (see Venona Project); U.S. President Harry Truman, John Wayne, Mickey Rooney, and many others. Frank Sinatra was staying at the hotel during the kidnapping of Frank Sinatra Jr. The Sky Room at the top of the Mapes was a famous nightclub and stage where many of the biggest singers and entertainers of the time such as Sinatra, Liberace, Jimmy Durante and Milton Berle performed; at one point, Sammy Davis Jr. performed there but was prohibited from staying in the hotel due to segregation. During location shooting for the television series, Bonanza, many guest stars would reside at the Mapes. In 1959, Jack Carson appeared on Bonanza, while doing shows in the Sky Room. It was memorably showcased in a 1961 episode of Route 66, guest starring Walter Matthau. During the 1970s, brothel owner Joe Conforte paid a percentage to the Mapes Hotel bell men as they directed clients to his Mustang Ranch. It features prominently in the 1974 film California Split.

== Legacy ==
The hotel has also continued to inspire contemporary cultural projects; in 2025, Reno-born artist Amadour described "The Mapes Suite," a visual and musical project based on the demolished hotel's Black, queer, and Hollywood histories.
