= Riverside Hotel (Reno, Nevada) =

- U.S. National Register of Historic Places
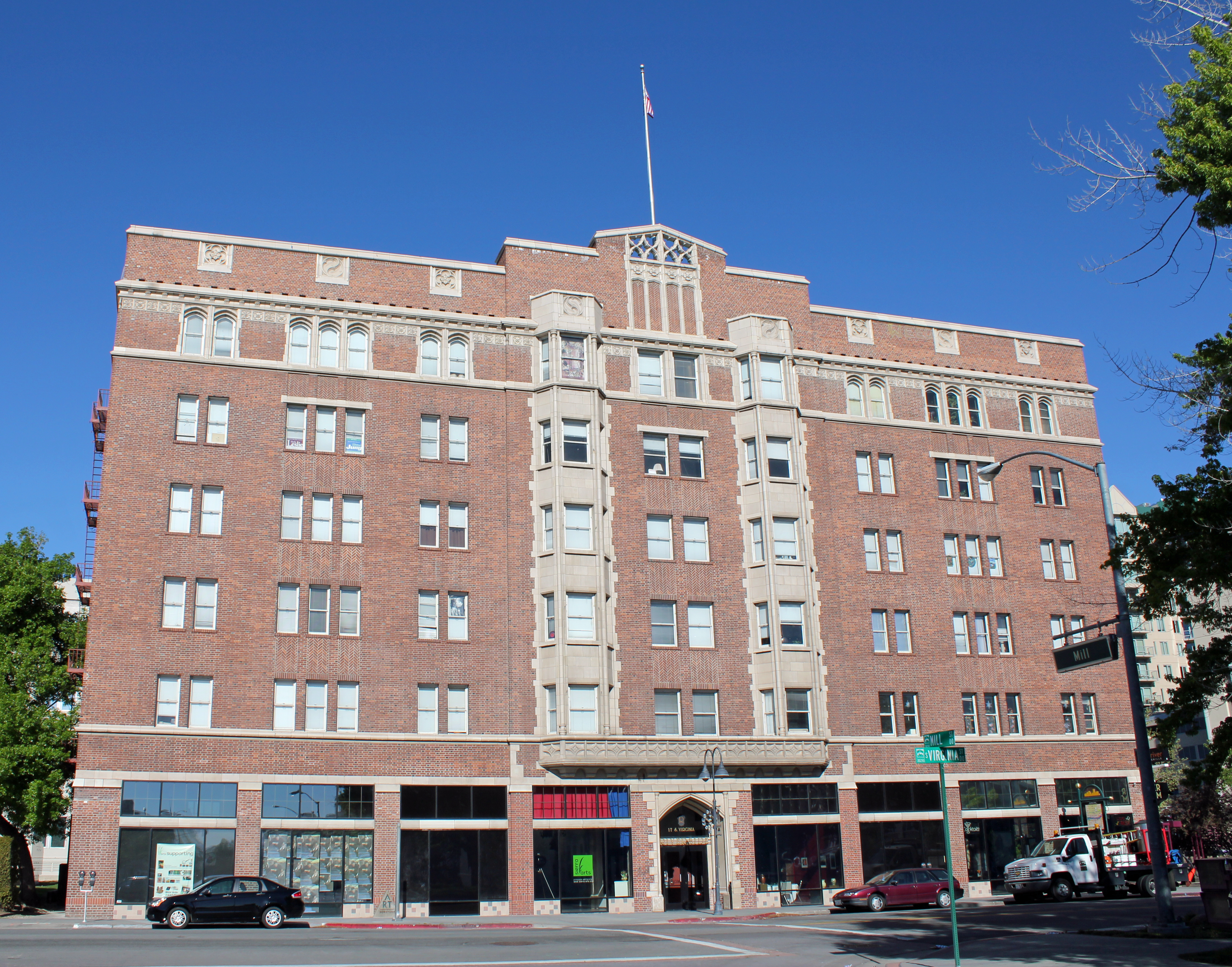

- Location within Nevada
- Location: 17 South Virginia Street; Reno, Nevada 89501
- Coordinates: 39°31′28.92″N 119°48′44.68″W
- Built: 1927; 99 years ago
- Architect: Frederic DeLongchamps
- Architectural style: Gothic Revival
- MPS: Architecture of Frederick J. DeLongchamps TR
- NRHP reference No.: 86002256
- Added to NRHP: August 6, 1986; 40 years ago

Riverside Hotel & Casino
- Interactive map of Riverside Hotel & Casino
- Location: 17 South Virginia Street, Reno, Nevada
- Opened: 1927
- Closed: 1986
- Notable restaurants: Wild River Grille
- Casino type: Land-based
- Owner: Jessie Beck

Riverside Hotel is a former hotel and casino located in Downtown Reno, Nevada, that sits on the exact location where Reno began in 1859. The building now houses apartments and studios for artists and is listed on the National Register of Historic Places.

== Early history ==
C. W. Fuller operated a log building on this location that provided food and shelter to gold-seekers who were passing through the area in the reverse gold rush called the "Rush to Washoe" (meaning people were heading east from instead of west to California), spurred by the gold, and later silver, strikes of the Comstock Lode. Myron Lake owned the property from 1861 into the 1880s, running consecutive hotel businesses under the name Lake's House. After Lake's death, his daughter and son-in-law operated the hotel and renamed it the Riverside. A subsequent owner, Harry Gosse, converted the small frame building into a brick hotel, retaining the name Riverside. His daughter, Marguerite Gosse, was a Nevada Assemblywoman. This version of the Riverside Hotel was destroyed in a fire. Gosse intended to rebuild but was unable to finance the project and George Wingfield, Reno's most powerful man at the time, acquired the property.

Nevada's pre-eminent architect and former mining engineer Frederic DeLongchamps designed the 1927 version of the Riverside Hotel for George Wingfield. At six stories high, the Riverside was the state's tallest building until Reno's seven-story El Cortez hotel was completed in 1931. For the building's design, DeLongchamps employed the rich red brick, so common in Reno, with contrasting cream-colored Gothic Revival style terra cotta detailing. Situated as it is along the Truckee River, next to the Washoe County Courthouse, also designed by DeLongchamps, the Riverside was Reno's most popular hotel. Following the passage of the liberal 1931 divorce law, George Wingfield installed an enormous roof sign advertising the hotel in glowing neon that was visible all over the Truckee Meadows. The Riverside had an international reputation and was mentioned in nearly all of the novels and films featuring Reno divorces.

The Riverside Hotel was laid out to suit wealthy divorce-seekers, with 40 corner suites that included kitchen facilities and connecting rooms for children and servants. Each of the apartment suites was furnished with a specially designed cork-insulated and tile-lined refrigerator. Cold brine was circulated through the refrigerators from the main refrigeration plant in the basement. There were 60 single rooms for shorter stays as well. Such a room was occupied by Clare Boothe (award-winning author, editor of Vanity Fair, congresswoman and ambassador) when she arrived in Reno in 1929 to divorce her husband George Tuttle Brokaw:

Her train arrived in Reno at 4:30 a.m. on Wednesday, February 6, 1929, in a fierce blizzard. Clare's mood turned bleak as the weather when she discovered that her reserved apartment at the Riverside Hotel (a red brick building between the Truckee River and the courthouse) was occupied and that she would have to settle for a 'cubby hole' of a room for the first three days.

The Riverside Hotel was the spot most watched by news correspondents who had been sent to cover the national phenomenon journalist Walter Winchell dubbed "Renovation". Reno had nearly as many reporters on hand as divorce-seekers, with news bureaus representing Associated Press, United Press, International News Service, The Sacramento Bee and the New York Daily News, all looking for an exclusive story.

== Casino ==
As a bonus to the Riverside's suites, Wingfield opened the Riverside Bank and leased out casino space in exchange for a sizable (up to 25%) cut of the club's profits. Additionally, Wingfield was earning a share of the profits from several clubs, including the Rex and Bank Club run by his protégés: Bill Graham and Jim McKay.

Later, McKay and Graham decided that having access to a bank could make them money even faster than the casinos did. Throughout the late 1920s, Graham and McKay worked with con men from all over the country to draw in wealthy vacationers to Reno. Once in town, the tourists would be systematically fleeced of their stock holdings and sent on their way.

The casino inside the Riverside, run by Nick Abelman, provided plentiful entertainment for hotel guests and local patrons, including high-class shows, table games, and slot machines.

Abelman ran the gaming with his partners, Steve Pavlovich and Bert Riddick, until 1949, when Mert Wertheimer convinced Wingfield to let him expand the casino. Wertheimer, most recently working with the Nevada Club group after coming to Reno from Detroit, was well-financed from his operations at the Chesterfield Club (and others) in the Motor-City.

The Riverside quickly expanded, adding 84 guest rooms and the first swimming pool to be built in a Reno hotel. Wingfield eventually sold the hotel in December 1955, leading to the club to see a progression of owners over the next 25 years, most of whom ran a casino.

In 1967, the Nevada Gaming Commission revoked the gaming license at the Riverside over a dice-cheating scandal, and the Riverside closed completely in 1968. In 1971, Jessie Beck purchased the property and opened her own casino.

Beck ran a profitable operation and in 1978, she sold the Riverside to Harrah's Entertainment so they could make a deal for the Overland Casino owned by "Pick" Hobson. "Pick" took over the Riverside and ran the hotel and casino until it finally closed in 1986, nearly 60 years since Wingfield rebuilt the hotel along the Truckee River.
