= Arlington Towers =

22-story condo tower in Reno, Nevada, USA

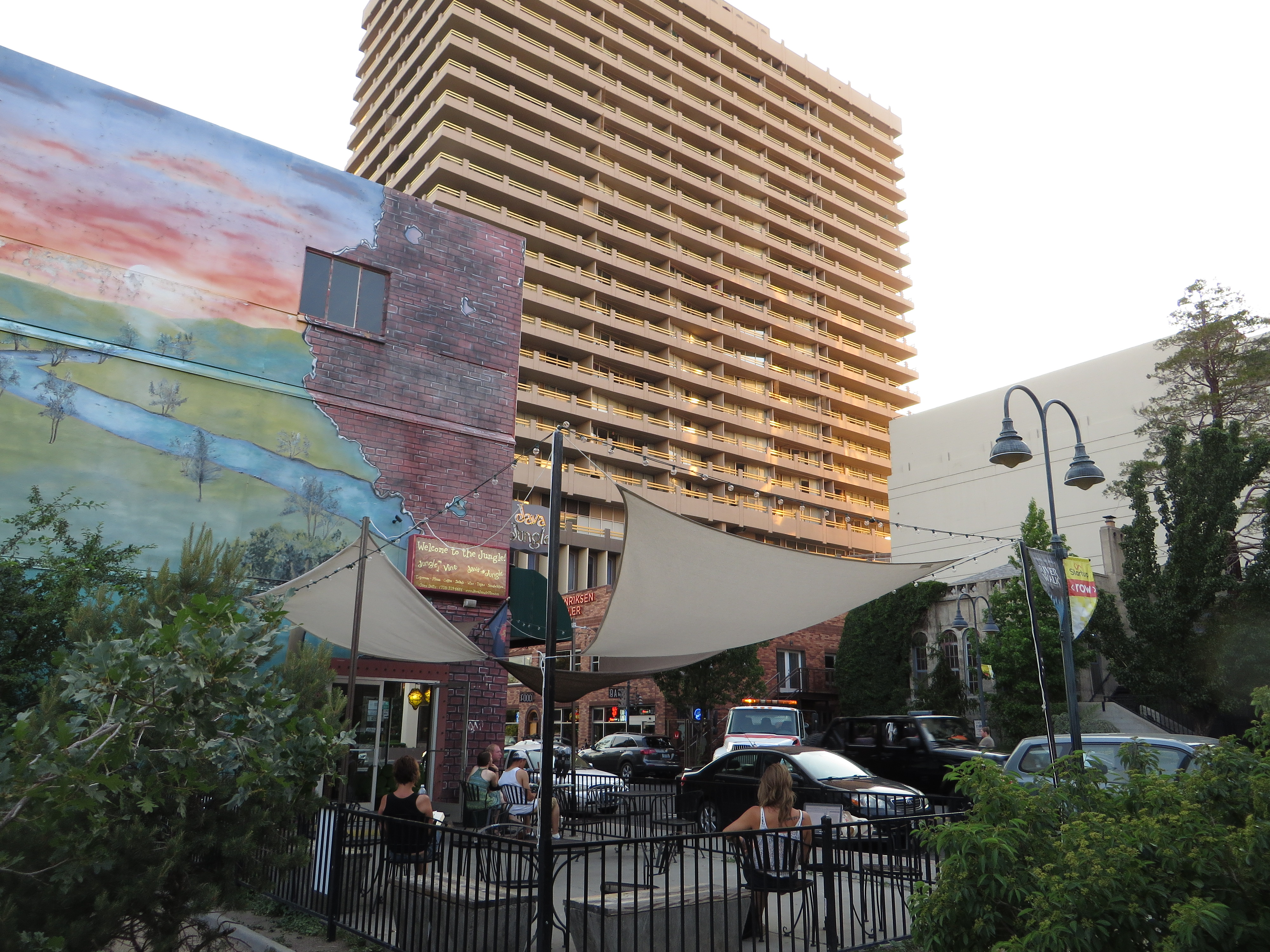
- Arlington Towers in 2015
- Interactive map of the Arlington Towers area

General information
- Status: Completed
- Type: Condominiums; Office; Retail
- Location: 100 North Arlington Avenue, Reno, Nevada, United States
- Coordinates: 39.525384°N 119.816695°W
- Construction started: June 29, 1965
- Opened: 1967
- Cost: $4.5 million

Technical details
- Floor count: 22

Design and construction
- Developer: John Cavanaugh Sr.
- Engineer: John Sardis

Other information
- Number of units: 194

Arlington Towers is a 22-story condominium tower located at 100 North Arlington Avenue in Reno, Nevada. Construction began in June 1965, with completion initially scheduled for August 1966. Completion was delayed because of various issues, including a 78-day construction worker strike. The 22-story tower was ultimately completed in 1967, and was the tallest building in Reno until 1969.

Arlington Towers initially consisted of apartment units before being converted to condominiums in 1980. The building contains shops and offices on the first two floors.

== History ==
=== Construction ===
Arlington Towers was originally built as an apartment building, developed by owner John Cavanaugh Sr. L. E. Dixon Company was the general contractor.

Work on the project began on June 29, 1965. The first section of the concrete foundation for the new tower was poured in early July 1965, setting a record for the largest concrete pour in Reno history, with 750 cubic yards of concrete being poured. The remainder of the foundation was poured on July 14, 1965, breaking the previous record. The second pour required a 70-man crew and resulted in 1,150 cubic yards of concrete.

Construction of the 22-story tower was underway in September 1965. At that time, assembly of an $80,000, 40-ton climbing crane was being done within the building's elevator shaft. Completion of one floor per week was the goal, with completion of the building targeted for August 1966. By October 21, 1965, construction had reached the third floor and was on schedule.

In December 1965, California engineer John Sardis, who designed the building, was charged $900 for practicing architecture in Nevada without a license. According to Sardis' lawyer, his design for the building was an engineering concept rather than an architectural concept. Construction reached the fifth floor later that month. Upon completion, the tower was to stand 255.10 feet (77.75 m), approximately 24 feet (7.3 m) higher than the tallest building in Reno at that time: the 16-story First National Bank of Nevada. The first three floors were to be occupied by offices and retail shops, while the fourth floor would be recreational and the remaining floors would be residential.

In February 1966, concrete was poured for the 10th floor, while a crew of 75 men were working on various aspects of the building, now scheduled for completion on November 23, 1966. In May 1966, the largest concrete pour in Reno occurred across the street from Arlington Towers at the site of a parking garage for the new project. The pour created 1,250 cubic yards of concrete to serve as the base for the new six-story parking garage, which was expected to cost $648,000. The pour took 11 hours, and required 23 men, 16 trucks, and 2 cranes. Construction on Arlington Towers reached the 20th floor in June 1966.

By September 1966, the project had fallen 65 days behind schedule due to a construction worker strike in northern Nevada. At Arlington Towers, only 85 workers were on the job when the number normally would have been more than 250. The strike lasted 78 days, and other issues raised the total number of lost work days to 145. The parking facility, with 285 spaces, was 90 percent complete in December 1966, with its opening expected for the following month.

An elevator installers' strike began on February 6, 1967, after only one of the tower's three elevators had been installed. The garage was opened by March 1967, and included a 33-ton pedestrian bridge connecting to the tower, which was scheduled for completion by the following month, at a cost of $4.5 million. Due to the elevator installers' strike, the tower was expected to open with only one elevator, while an estimated six weeks would be required to finish approximately 20 percent of the elevator work that was remaining.

=== Operation ===
Arlington Towers was the tallest building in Reno when it was completed, and retained that title until the completion of a Harrah's Reno hotel tower in 1969. The 22-story building stands approximately 260 feet (79 m), and featured 194 units at the time of its opening. In 1969, the Cavanaugh family sold the tower for $9 million to Sam Zell, who promised that the family would not owe any taxes by selling the property. Arlington Towers appeared in the 1973 film, Charley Varrick. The Cavanaugh family filed a lawsuit against Zell in 1974, after the Internal Revenue Service requested more than $100,000 in taxes.

In December 1978, plans were underway for owner Mason Corporation to sell the building to a group which intended to convert the apartments to condominiums, a process that could take up to eight months. The conversion to condominiums was approved by the city planning commission and city council in April 1979, with plans for the conversion to begin in August. Condominium units went on sale in March 1980, and Nu-West completed its purchase of the building from Mason Corporation in August 1980. As of March 1982, Nu-West had sold 127 condominium units; poor economic conditions prevented additional units from selling. That month, Nu-West set June 30, 1982 as the target date to sell the remaining 68 units in the building.

The first floor contains 11,000 sq ft (1,000 m^{2}) of retail space, while the second floor includes 11,000 sq ft (1,000 m^{2}) of office space.

Arlington Towers remains the 11th tallest building in Reno.
