= Alpha Tau Omega Fraternity House (Reno, Nevada) =

Historic house in Reno, Nevada

- U.S. National Register of Historic Places
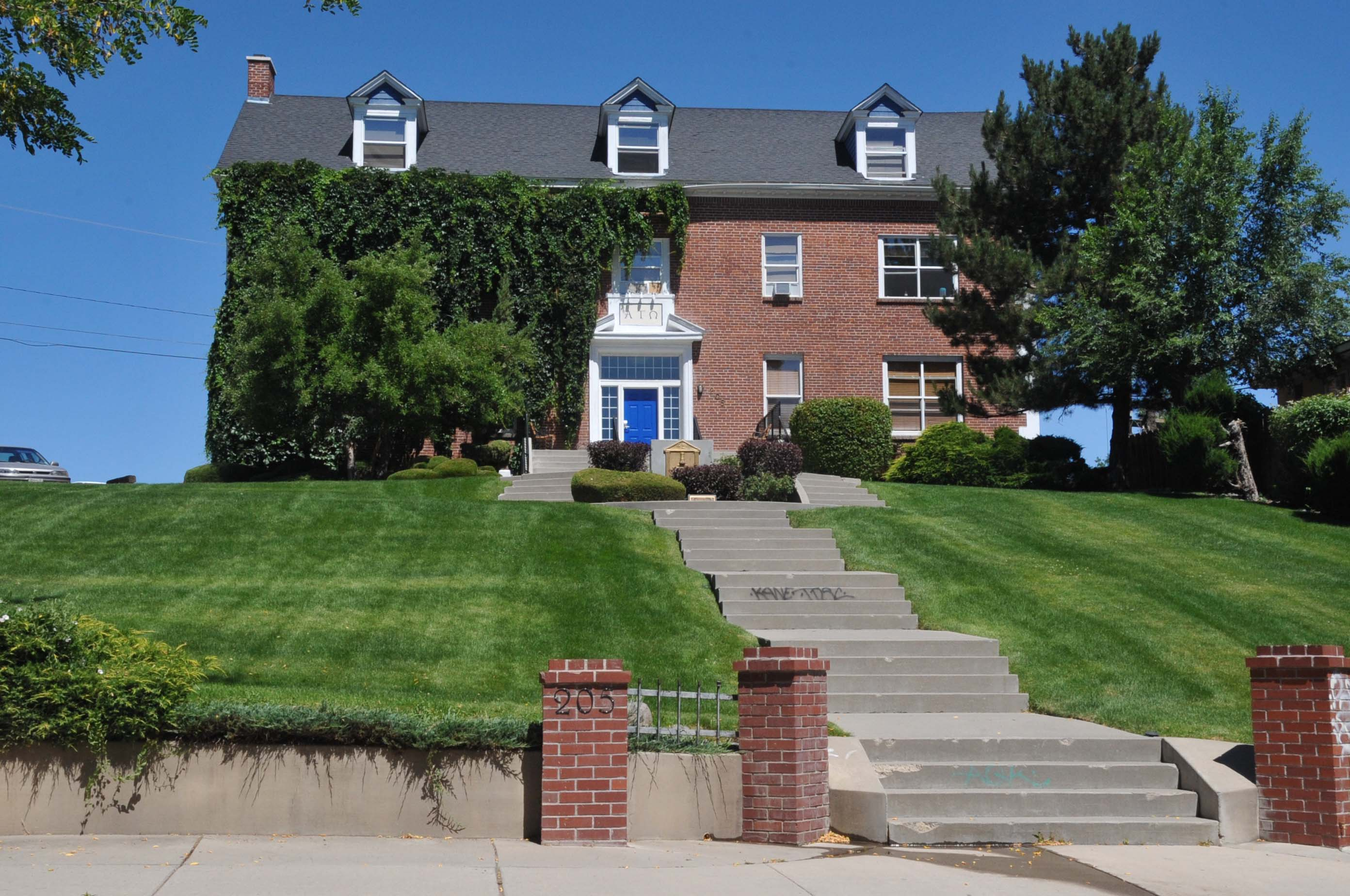

- Location within Nevada Location within the United States
- Location: 205 University Terrace, Reno, Nevada
- Coordinates: 39°32′08″N 119°49′10″W
- Area: 0.5 acres (0.20 ha)
- Built: 1929
- Built by: Ferris, Lehman "Monk"
- Architectural style: Colonial Revival
- NRHP reference No.: 03001508
- Added to NRHP: January 28, 2004

The Alpha Tau Omega Fraternity House, also known as the ATO House, is a Colonial Revival building in Reno, Nevada that was built in 1929. It was listed on the National Register of Historic Places in 2004.

== History ==
Alpha Tau Omega (ATO) predecessor organization at the University of Nevada, Reno was the local fraternity, Phi Delta Tau, founded in 1912. It was the third fraternity at the university. Phi Delta Tau became the Delta Iota chapter of Alpha Tau Omega in 1921. In 1921, the chapter formed the Delta Iota Building Association which purchased a house at 745 University Avenue. In 1928, the Delta Iota chapter had 45 active members and had outgrown its two-story house which could only house twenty members.

The fraternity built its chapter house in 1929. It funded the project in part by selling $10,000 in bonds, at $50 each. It also had equity in its existing chapter house and owned three lots in Reno, collectively totaling $20,000 in value. The three lots were previously purchased for a new house but were sold when five lots were found at a better location for $2,750.

The cornerstone of the house was laid in a ceremony on April 30, 1929. The Alpha Tau Omega Fraternity House is at 205 University Terrace, on a hill overlooking University Terrace Avenue in Reno's West University neighborhood, amongst other fraternities and sororities. It was the first fraternity-built house at the University of Nevada, Reno. Its construction and furnishings cost $32,000 ($600,000 in 2022 money). Construction was finished by June 1929; the house was dedicated in memory of Erskine Mayo Ross, an Alpha Tau Omega founder.

During World War II, the chapter house was used as a residence and dining hall for female students. In 1984, the chapter house was temporarily closed by the city fire marshall for fire hazards. The chapter's alumni raised more than $50,000 to renovate the house which was reoccupied in the fall of 1988.

It was listed on the National Register of Historic Places on January 28, 2004.

== Architecture ==
The ATO Delta Iota chapter house was designed by Reno architect Lehman "Monk" Ferris. Ferris was a member of Phi Delta Tau, the predecessor of the Delta Iota chapter. He also served as the supervising architect for the construction project.

The house consists of three stories and a basement. It is constructed of red brick and was placed on what was originally five lots. Its NRHP nomination describes it as an "outstanding" example of Colonial Revival architecture.

The house's facade features three gabled dormers and a centered door, topped by "an upside-down pedimented crown supported by decorative pilasters, sidelights, and a horizontal double row of small panes beneath the crown". The Greek letters ΑΤΩ above the pediment. The fraternity's coat of arms is a decorative feature above the double window over the pediment. It also has sand-colored stone quoins.

The house's first level includes a dining room, a living room, a reception hall, a cloakroom, a serving pantry with a dumbwaiter, a glassed-in porch, and a bedroom with a bathroom. The second floor has dormitory bedrooms with built-in dressers, sleeping porches, and a large bathroom. The third floor has more bedrooms, a bathroom, and a storage room. The basement includes a chapter room, kitchen, room for the cook, the furnace room, and a "rough house" room.

There is a single-story wing off of the northeast side of the house. In 1987, the interior was refurbished and the rear roofline was changed in 1987 to increase the size of the third-story level.

== See also ==
- North American fraternity and sorority housing
