= Marguerite Gosse Clark =

American politician

(undated)

Marguerite H. Gosse Clark (née Gosse; after first marriage, Stoddard; after second marriage, Clark; March 13, 1890 – 1972) was an American politician. She was the first woman native to the state to serve in the Nevada Legislature.

== Early life ==
Marguerite H. Gosse was born in Virginia City, Nevada in 1890. Her father, Harry Gosse, was the owner of the Riverside Hotel in Reno, Nevada, a member of the Improved Order of Red Men, and a past Past Grand Sachem of the State of Nevada. Her mother was Josephine. She had a brother, Henry.

== Career ==
She was a Republican member of the Nevada Assembly (1922–24), representing Washoe County. Gosse was the first woman native to the state to serve in the Nevada Legislature. In 1922, she became the founder of the Nevada Womans' Party. The following year, she introduced the Nurse Practice Act of Nevada; this legislation provided for Registered Nurses in the state.

== Personal life ==
She first married Richard Stoddard. She secondly married Jack Clark (1883-1969), who owned gaming and bar interests in Reno.

Marguerite Clark died in Carthage, Missouri in 1972.
