= Mizpah Hotel =

- U.S. National Register of Historic Places
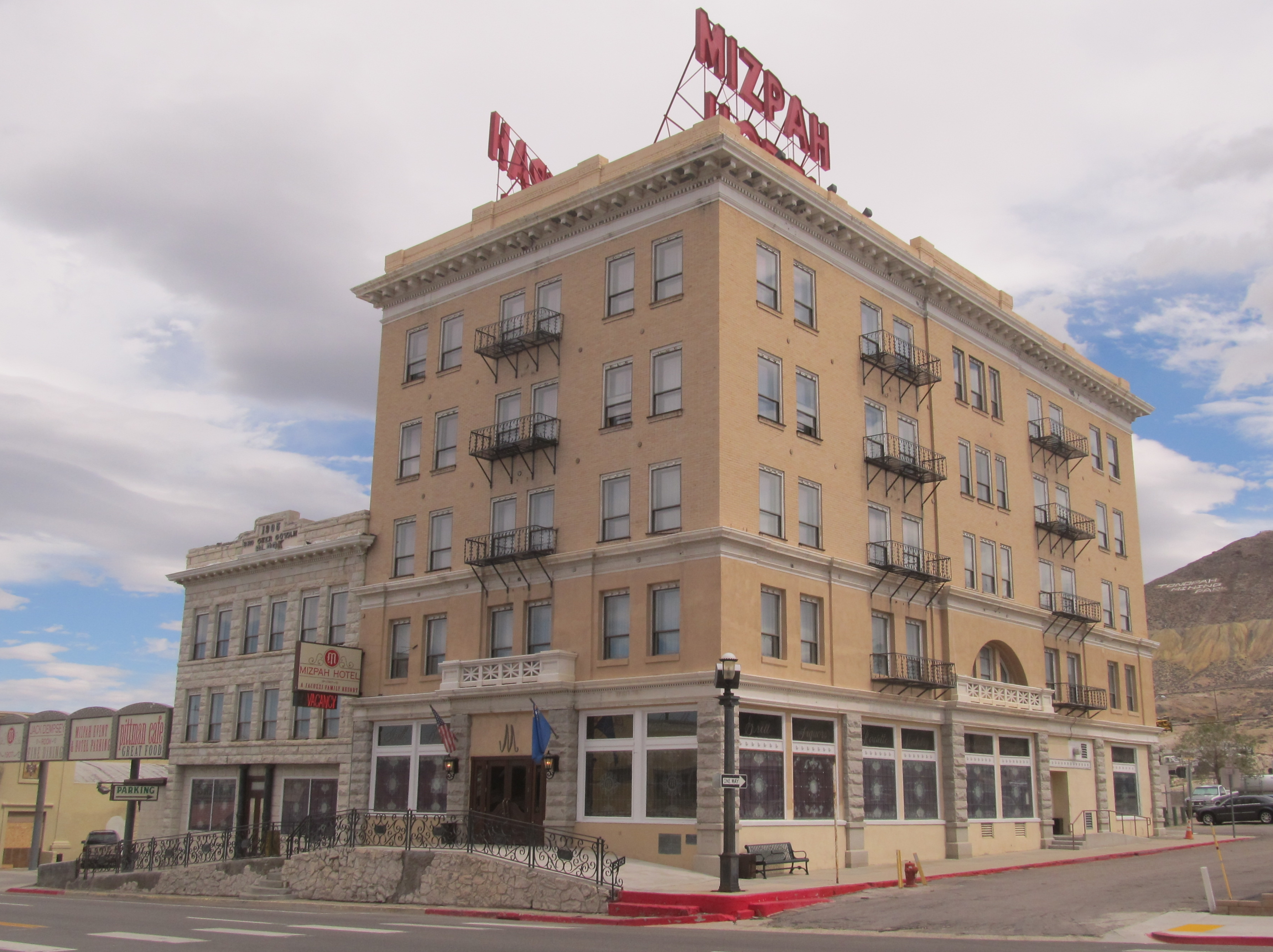
- Mizpah Hotel

- Location within Nevada Location within the United States
- Location: 100 Main St., Tonopah, Nevada
- Coordinates: 38°4′6″N 117°13′51″W
- Built: 1905; 121 years ago
- Architect: M.J. Curtis
- MPS: Tonopah MRA (AD)
- NRHP reference No.: 78001725
- Added to NRHP: July 7, 1978

The Mizpah Hotel is a historic hotel in Tonopah, Nevada, U.S. It is a member of Historic Hotels of America, the official program of the National Trust for Historic Preservation.

== Mizpah Saloon ==
The Mizpah and the nearby Belvada Building, both five stories high, shared the title of tallest building in Nevada until 1927. The hotel was named after the Mizpah Mine and was the social hub of Tonopah. The hotel was pre-dated by the Mizpah Saloon, which opened in 1907, and was the first permanent structure in Tonopah. The hotel was financed by George Wingfield, George S. Nixon, Cal Brougher and Bob Govan and designed by George E. Holesworth of Reno, Nevada (other sources state that the architect was Morrill J. Curtis). Brougher in particular was involved with the Belmont, Tonopah, Midway and Tonopah Mining Company and the Tonopah Divide Mining Company. Brougher owned the Tonopah Banking Corporation, which had an office in the lobby of the 1905 building, and was a director of the Bank of Italy in San Francisco.

According to legend, Wyatt Earp kept the saloon, Jack Dempsey was a bouncer, and Howard Hughes married Jean Peters at the Mizpah. But Wyatt Earp left Tonopah before the Mizpah was built, Hughes was married in Tonopah, but not at the Mizpah, and Dempsey asserted he was never a bouncer. The hotel nevertheless features the Jack Dempsey Room and the Wyatt Earp Bar.

== Construction of the hotel ==
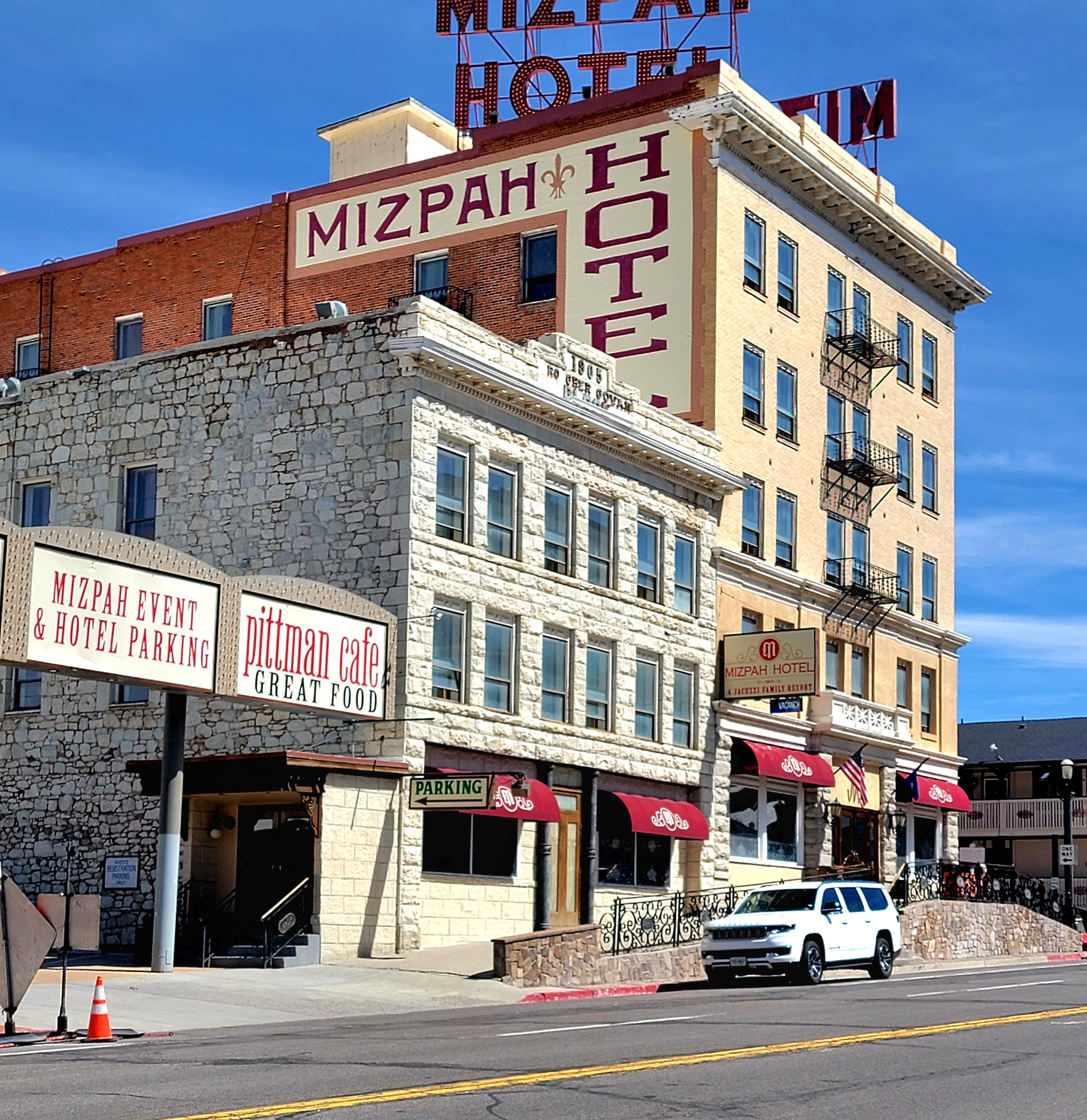
The Mizpah Hotel in 2024

The reinforced concrete hotel was faced with stone on the front and brick on the sides and rear. The neighboring three-story Brougher-Govan Block, with rooms on the upper floors, served as the first Mizpah and remains connected. Cast iron columns were used in the windows and fire escapes. The three and five story buildings are joined with a wood stairway crowned with a skylight. Steam heat was provided, along with the first elevator in Tonopah.

== Haunting by the Lady in Red ==
The hotel is said to house a ghost deemed the Lady in Red by hotel guests who have experienced her presence. Legend says that the Lady in Red is the ghost of a prostitute who was murdered on the fifth floor of the hotel by a jealous ex-boyfriend. Another widely accepted description of the events is that The Lady in Red had been caught cheating by her husband at the hotel after he had missed a train, who then proceeded to kill her in a jealous rage. The Lady in Red haunting of the Mizpah was featured in season 5, episode 2 of Ghost Adventures on the Travel Channel. Other ghosts are also said to exist there and USA Today ranked the hotel first in its 2018 list of “Best Haunted Hotels in the US” as determined by readers. It maintained a spot of seventh on that same list in 2022.

== Reconstruction by Frank Scott ==
The Mizpah changed hands several times through the years until Frank Scott of Las Vegas (who also built the Union Plaza Hotel) bought it in 1979. Scott updated the hotel with “all the modern conveniences,” acting as a bridge to the modern day, all the while preserving the antiquated romance that had first drawn him to the hotel. In all, the work took 2.5 years and cost almost $4 million.

== Renovation by Fred and Nancy Cline ==
The hotel had been shuttered since 1999, but in early 2011, the hotel was purchased by Fred and Nancy Cline of Cline Cellars, Sonoma, California, who renovated and reopened the building to the public in August 2011. The newly renovated hotel has 47 rooms, a bar, and two restaurants; the Pittman Cafe and the Jack Dempsey Room. There is also a casino (with occasional table play), the Mizpah Club, on site. There are plans to renovate further rooms in the hotel annex.

== See also ==
- Goldfield Hotel
