= List of tallest buildings in Nevada =

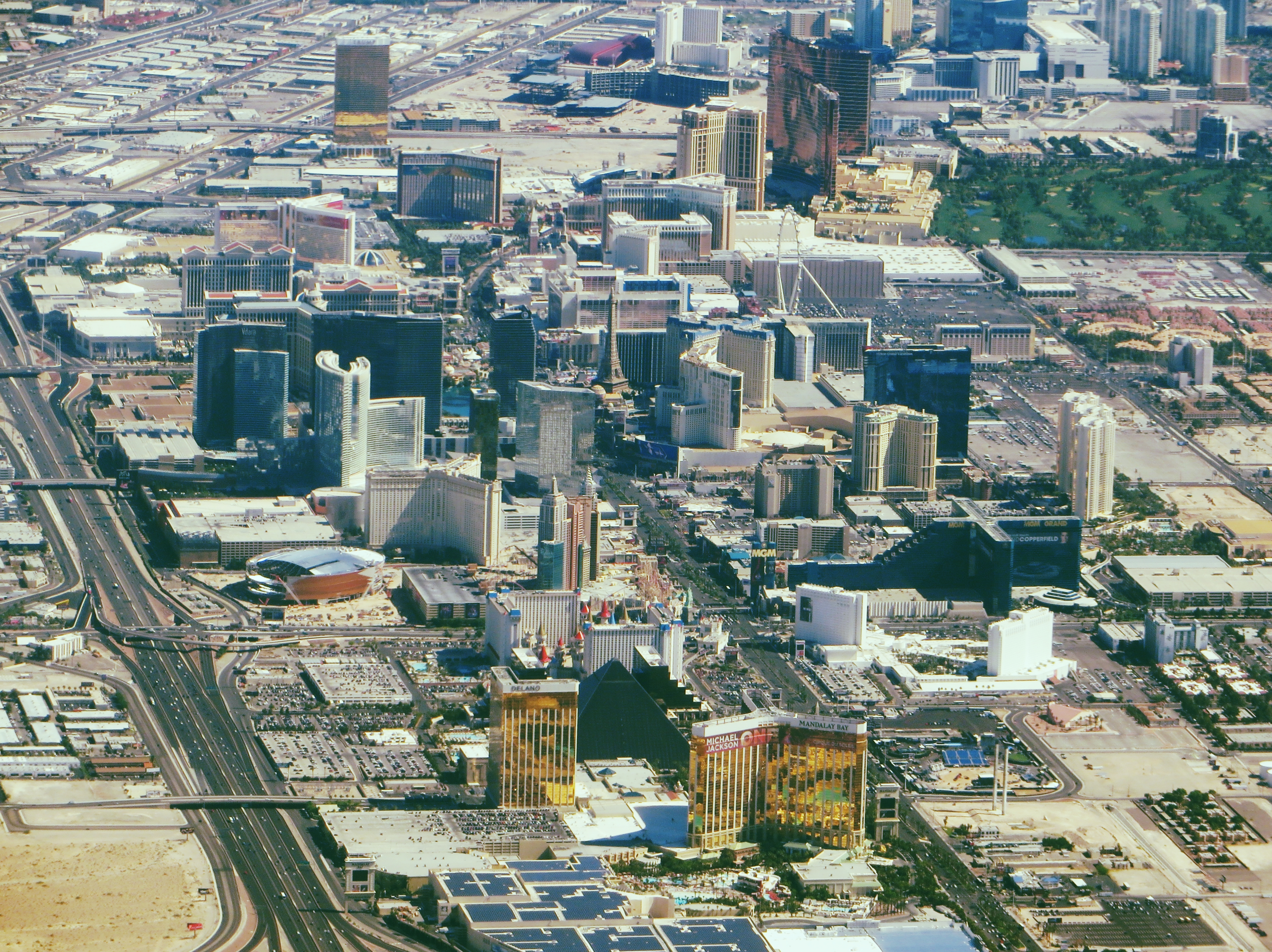
Many of the state's tallest buildings are located on and near the Las Vegas Strip.

This list of tallest buildings in Nevada ranks buildings in the state of Nevada by tallest height. This list, which includes buildings with a minimum height of 250 feet (76 m), features the 57 tallest buildings in the state, starting at 260 feet. The tallest structure in the state is the Strat tower in Las Vegas, with a height of 1,149 feet (350 m). The tower, located north of the Las Vegas Strip, is also the tallest observation tower in the United States. Because the tower is not fully habitable, it is not considered a building.

The tallest building in the state is the Fontainebleau Las Vegas, with a height of 737 feet (225 m); the building was topped out in November 2008, but was put on hold the following year, and eventually opened in 2023. Up to that point, Nevada's tallest completed building was the 50-story Palazzo, which stands at 642 feet (196 m) and was completed in 2007. Outside of Las Vegas, the tallest building is the 38-floor Silver Legacy Resort & Casino, located in Reno and completed in 1995, with a height of 410 feet (120 m).

== List of tallest buildings ==
An equal sign (=) following a rank indicates a shared height between two or more buildings. The "Year" column indicates the year in which a building was completed. Freestanding observation towers, while not habitable buildings, are included for comparison purposes but not ranked.

=== Buildings over 500 feet ===
Rank	Name	Image	City	Height ft (m)	Floors	Year	Coordinates	Notes
(Note: According to the Council on Tall Buildings and Urban Habitat, freestanding observation towers are not considered to be buildings, as they are not fully habitable structures. These structures are included for comparative purposes.)	The Strat	Ground-level view of a tall, concrete tower. The tower curves inward about 30 stories up, but then projects outward. Its uppermost section consists of a rounded, black glass platform and a large, thin spire.	Las Vegas	1,150 (350)	112	1996	36°8′50.59″N 115°9′19.40″W	Tallest observation tower in the United States and the second-tallest in the Western Hemisphere after the CN Tower in Toronto.; Second-tallest free-standing structure in the U.S. west of the Mississippi River, after the Kennecott Smokestack in Utah.; The state's tallest structure since 1996.
1	Fontainebleau Las Vegas	Ground-level view of an under construction 63-story building; The building's lower floors are covered in glass, but its upper 30 floors are unfinished and uncovered.	Winchester	737 (224)	68	2023	36°8′15.97″N 115°9′33.92″W	Topped out in November 2008.; Construction stopped in 2009, then resumed in 2021 and opened in 2023.; Tallest building in Las Vegas and the state.; Tallest building constructed in Las Vegas during the 2000s.
2	Resorts World Las Vegas		Winchester	673 (205)	59	2021	36°8′0.07″N 115°9′57.63″W	Tallest building constructed in Las Vegas during the 2010s.
3	The Palazzo	Ground-level view of a curved building with a tan facade. The building has dark windows and several protruding ledges at various points.	Paradise	642 (196)	50	2007	36°7′26.69″N 115°10′4.35″W	
4	Trump International Hotel & Tower – Tower One	Ground-level view of a building with a rectangular cross section and a golden glass facade	Paradise	640 (195)	64	2008	36°7′46.96″N 115°10′21.27″W	Tallest residential building in Las Vegas.
5	Encore at Wynn Las Vegas	Ground-level view of a convex, curved building; the building has a complete glass facade and is light brown in color.	Paradise	631 (192)	52	2008	36°7′46.4″N 115°9′52.92″W	
6	Wynn Las Vegas		Paradise	614 (187)	49	2005	36°7′35.23″N 115°9′56.55″W	
7=	The Cosmopolitan Boulevard Tower	Cosmopolitan Resort in 2010 from the east.	Paradise	610 (184)	61	2010	36°6′35.45″N 115°10′26.13″W	
7=	The Cosmopolitan Casino Chelsea Tower	Cosmopolitan Resort from north in 2010.	Paradise	610 (184)	61	2010	36°6′35.45″N 115°10′26.13″W	
9=	Aria Resort & Casino	Distant ground-level view of 48-story tower; the building has a curved facade of blue glass. It is under construction, but nearly complete. Several unfinished buildings are visible around it.	Paradise	600 (183)	48	2009	36°6′28.15″N 115°10′37.41″W	
9=	Elara	View of Elara tower Las Vegas from south.	Paradise	600 (183)	56	2009	36°6′30.65″N 115°10′7.75″W	
11	Vdara	Elevated view of a construction site; at center is the partially completed steel frame of a curved building. Several cranes and construction vehicles are visible.	Paradise	570 (174)	57	2009	36°6′34.02″N 115°10′40.66″W	
12	Waldorf Astoria Las Vegas	Ground level view of a 47-story building with a rectangular cross section and an all-glass facade; the building is still under construction, and a crane is visible on its roof.	Paradise	560 (171)	47	2009	36°6′22.32″N 115°10′27.83″W	
	High Roller	High Roller under construction in Las Vegas in September 2013	Paradise	550 (167)	55 stories	2014	36°7′3.55″N 115°10′5.61″W	Although it is not a building, the High Roller is included here for comparison purposes.; Once the world's tallest Ferris wheel.
	Eiffel Tower at Paris Las Vegas	Ground-level view of a steel tower; the tower is broad at its base, rising from four separate legs. It then tapers, with each leg meeting to form a single, latticework column. Three platforms are visible at various heights up the side of the structure.	Paradise	540 (165)	54	1999	36°6′44.88″N 115°10′20.23″W	A half-scale replica of the Eiffel Tower in Paris, France.
13	New York-New York Hotel & Casino	Ground-level view of buildings replicating the New York City skyline.	Paradise	529 (161)	45	1997	36°6′8.06″N 115°10′27.53″W	Tallest building constructed in Las Vegas during the 1990s.
14	Palms Place	Ground-level view of a 47-story building with a rectangular cross section and a grooved, all-glass facade	Paradise	517 (157)	48	2008	36°6′50.68″N 115°11′55.43″W	
15	The Martin	Panorama towers complex.	Paradise	513 (157)	42	2009	36°6′30.46″N 115°10′56.65″W	
16	Bellagio	Ground-level view of a broad, 40-story building; the structure is curved, and has a tan facade. A body of water is visible in the foreground.	Paradise	508 (155)	36	1998	36°6′47.16″N 115°10′35.52″W	
17	Sky Las Vegas	Sky Las Vegas from the south.	Winchester	500 (152)	45	2007	36°8′19.53″N 115°9′41.1″W	

=== Buildings from 400 to 500 feet ===
Rank	Name	Image	City	Height ft (m)	Floors	Year	Coordinates	Notes
18	Delano	Ground-level view of a V-shaped, 45-story building with a golden, all-glass facade; a palm tree is visible in the foreground, and it partially blocks the view of the skyscraper.	Paradise	485 (148)	45	2003	36°5′34.54″N 115°10′38.57″W	Originally opened as THEhotel in 2003, as part of the Mandalay Bay resort.
19	Mandalay Bay	Ground-level view of a building with three thin towers that meet at a central point to form a Y-shape; each has a golden glass facade.	Paradise	480 (146)	44	1999	36°5′30.48″N 115°10′29.22″W	
20	Circa Resort & Casino		Las Vegas	480 (146)	35	2020	36°10′18″N 115°8′44″W	
21=	Turnberry Place – Tower I	Distant ground-level view of four identical 40-story buildings; each structure has a white concrete facade with balconies at every floor level and a rounded roof.	Winchester	477 (145)	38	2001	36°8′26.39″N 115°9′11.24″W	
21=	Turnberry Place – Tower II	Distant ground-level view of four identical 40-story buildings; each structure has a white concrete facade with balconies at every floor level and a rounded roof.	Winchester	477 (145)	38	2002	36°8′26.39″N 115°9′11.24″W	
21=	Turnberry Place – Tower III	Distant ground-level view of four identical 40-story buildings; each structure has a white concrete facade with balconies at every floor level and a rounded roof.	Winchester	477 (145)	38	2004	36°8′26.39″N 115°9′11.24″W	
21=	Turnberry Place – Tower IV	Distant ground-level view of four identical 40-story buildings; each structure has a white concrete facade with balconies at every floor level and a rounded roof.	Winchester	477 (145)	38	2006	36°8′26.39″N 115°9′11.24″W	
25=	The Signature at MGM Grand – Tower I	Ground level view of three towers; the one farthest to the left is complete, and has an all-white facade with balconies and light windows. The two buildings on the right are both under construction; the middle tower is nearly complete, with some concrete still exposed and a crane on the roof. The tower farthest to the right is also incomplete and has about 10 stories of framework constructed.	Paradise	475 (145)	38	2006	36°6′24.66″N 115°9′59.18″W	
25=	The Signature at MGM Grand – Tower II	Ground level view of three towers; the one farthest to the left is complete, and has an all-white facade with balconies and light windows. The two buildings on the right are both under construction; the middle tower is nearly complete, with some concrete still exposed and a crane on the roof. The tower farthest to the right is also incomplete and has about 10 stories of framework constructed.	Paradise	475 (145)	38	2006	36°6′24.66″N 115°9′59.18″W	
25=	The Signature at MGM Grand – Tower III	Ground level view of three towers; the one farthest to the left is complete, and has an all-white facade with balconies and light windows. The two buildings on the right are both under construction; the middle tower is nearly complete, with some concrete still exposed and a crane on the roof. The tower farthest to the right is also incomplete and has about 10 stories of framework constructed.	Paradise	475 (145)	38	2007	36°6′24.66″N 115°9′59.18″W	
25=	The Venetian	Distant ground-level view of a V-shaped building with a brick and tan facade and dark windows. Two shorter buildings with similar appearances are visible in the distance. A tall brick tower with a steep, green, pyramid-shaped roof is in the foreground.	Paradise	475 (145)	37	1999	36°7′17.83″N 115°10′9.29″W	
29	Allure Las Vegas – Tower I	Allure Las Vegas tower one in Las Vegas.	Las Vegas	466 (142)	41	2007	36°8′38.46″N 115°9′32.6″W	
30	Palms Fantasy Tower	Fantasy Tower at the Palms resort in Las Vegas	Paradise	458 (140)	40	2006	36°6′50.09″N 115°11′40.29″W	
31=	Turnberry Towers – Tower I	Ground-level view of a 45-story tower at night; the building, which is lit up, has a rectangular cross section and a white facade.	Winchester	453 (138)	45	2007	36°8′26.39″N 115°9′11.24″W	
31=	Turnberry Towers – Tower II	Ground-level view of a 45-story tower at night; the building, which is lit up, has a rectangular cross section and a white facade.	Winchester	453 (138)	45	2008	36°8′26.39″N 115°9′11.24″W	
33	Palace Tower (Caesars Palace)	Ground-level view of a 30-story skyscraper at night; the building, which is lit up, has a rectangular cross section and a white facade.	Paradise	435 (133)	30	1998	36°7′0.35″N 115°10′37.95″W	
34=	Veer Towers West	View of the twin Veers Towers complex from the west.	Paradise	433 (132)	37	2010	36°6′26.92″N 115°10′30.23″W	
34=	Veer Towers East	View of the twin Veers Towers complex from the west.	Paradise	433 (132)	37	2010	36°6′26.4″N 115°10′27.74″W	
36=	Masquerade Tower (Rio)	Distant ground-level view of an all-glass tower; the tower has several setbacks near its roof. The glass is mostly a dark blue color, but some windows are tinted red to form a stripe down the side of the building. A prominent "Rio" sign is visible in the foreground.	Paradise	423 (129)	41	1997	36°6′57.67″N 115°11′11.5″W	
36=	Palms Ivory Tower	Ivory Tower during 2008 renovations.	Paradise	423 (129)	42	2001	36°6′53.61″N 115°11′38.63″W	
38=	Marriott's Grand Chateau	Marriotts Grand Chateau tower view from west in Las Vegas.	Paradise	420 (128)	38	2008	36°6′27.68″N 115°10′10.07″W	
38=	Panorama Tower I	Panorama towers complex.	Paradise	420 (128)	33	2006	36°6′26.97″N 115°10′57.11″W	
38=	Panorama Tower II	Panorama towers complex.	Paradise	420 (128)	33	2007	36°6′23.97″N 115°10′57.34″W	
41	Silver Legacy Resort & Casino		Reno	410 feet (120 m)	38	1995	39.530455°N 119.815103°W	Tallest building in Reno.
42	Hilton Grand Vacations Club – Tower 2	Ground-level view of a 38-story tower and a 28-story tower, both brown in color.	Winchester	405 (123)	39	2006	36°8′23.9″N 115°9′38.78″W	
43=	The D Las Vegas	Ground-level view of the front entrance to the casino when it was called Fitzgeralds; a very prominent, colorful sign features a rainbow and a pot-of-gold. There are slot machines inside the building, and glass windows and part of a skyscraper are visible above the sign.	Las Vegas	400 (122)	34	1979	36°10′11.33″N 115°8′33.59″W	Tallest building in downtown Las Vegas.; Tallest building constructed in Las Vegas during the 1970s.
43=	Planet Hollywood Resort & Casino	Ground-level view of a sharp corner of a V-shaped building; the tower has a light tan facade with dark blue windows.	Paradise	400 (122)	40	2000	36°6′35.89″N 115°10′16.94″W	Originally opened as the Aladdin in 2000.; Renamed as Planet Hollywood in 2007.

=== Buildings from 250 to 400 feet ===
Rank	Name	Image	City	Height ft (m)	Floors	Year	Coordinates	Notes
45	Augustus Tower (Caesars Palace)		Paradise	365 feet (111 m)	26	2005		
46	Grand Sierra Resort		Reno	353 feet (108 m)	27	1978	39.522854°N 119.779226°W	
47	Nugget Casino Resort		Sparks	342 feet (104 m)	29	1984		
48	Riverside Resort & Casino – Tower II		Laughlin	337 feet (103 m)	28	1994		
49	Newport Lofts		Las Vegas	334 feet (102 m)	23	2007		
50	Harrah's Reno West Tower		Reno	324 feet (99 m)	24	1969	39.527536°N 119.812737°W	
51	Atlantis Luxury Tower		Reno	320 feet (98 m)	27	1991	39.488865°N 119.793785°W	
52	Regency Towers		Winchester	318 feet (97 m)	28	1974		The first high-rise condominium property to open in the Las Vegas Valley.
53	Edgewater Hotel and Casino		Laughlin	313 feet (95 m)	26	1987		
54	Laughlin River Lodge		Laughlin	301 feet (92 m)	25	1984		Originally opened as Sam's Town Gold River in 1984; Renamed as Gold River in 1991.; Renamed as River Palms in 1998.; Renamed as Laughlin River Lodge in 2014.
55	Tropicana Laughlin West Tower		Laughlin	295 feet (90 m)	25	1988		
56	The Montage Reno		Reno	284 feet (87 m)	24	1978	39.527716°N 119.813853°W	
57	Circus Circus Sky Tower		Reno	278 feet (85 m)	28	1978	39.531428°N 119.815698°W	
58	The Strat hotel tower		Las Vegas	276 feet (84 m)	24	c. 1983	36.148293°N 115.155137°W	A separate building from the observation tower.; Originally built as a hotel tower for Vegas World.
59	Harrah's Reno East Tower		Reno	272 feet (83 m)	26	1995	39.527536°N 119.812737°W	
60	Eldorado Resort Casino		Reno	270 feet (82 m)	26	1973	39.529133°N 119.814593°W	
61	Arlington Towers		Reno	260 feet (79 m)	22	1967	39.525384°N 119.816695°W	Tallest building in Reno until 1969.

== Timeline of tallest buildings since 1877 ==
From 1927 to 1956, most of the state's tallest buildings were located in Reno. Since 1956, the state's tallest buildings have been located in the Las Vegas Valley, beginning with the opening of the Fremont Hotel and Casino in Las Vegas. The Strat tower, completed in 1996, is excluded from this timeline.

Name	Image	City	Years as tallest	Height ft (m)	Floors	Coordinates	Notes
International Hotel		Virginia City	1877–1914	109 feet (33 m)	6	39.310985°N 119.649803°W	The hotel featured the state's first hydraulic elevator.; Burned down in December 1914.
Mizpah Hotel		Tonopah	1914–1927		5	38°4′6″N 117°13′51″W	
State Bank and Trust Company Building		Tonopah	1914–1927		5		Built in 1906.; Commonly known as the Belvada.
Riverside Hotel		Reno	1927–1931		6	39°31′28.92″N 119°48′44.68″W	
Hotel Nevada and Gambling Hall		Ely	1929–1931		6	39.248055°N 114.892815°W	The first fireproof building in the state.; Remains as the tallest building in Ely.
El Cortez hotel	.	Reno	1931–1947		7	39°31′36″N 119°48′57″W	
Mapes Hotel		Reno	1947–1956	133 feet (41 m)	12	39.52566°N 119.812576°W	Closed in 1982.; Demolished in 2001.
Fremont Hotel and Casino	.	Las Vegas	1956–1962	177 feet (54 m)	15	36°10′15″N 115°8′35″W	
Landmark	.	Paradise	1962–1969	297 feet (91 m) (Note: Excluding a rooftop sign added in 1967, the tower stood 297 feet (91 m). Various sources provide different measurements for the tower's total height, ranging from 328 feet (100 m) to 364 feet (111 m). See here for further information.)	31	36.133051°N 115.155808°W	Construction began in 1961, but was halted the following year, with the 31-story tower topped off.; Opened in 1969 and closed in 1990.; Demolished in 1995, and replaced by a parking lot for the nearby Las Vegas Convention Center.
International Hotel/Las Vegas Hilton	Distant ground-level view of a curved building with a white, concrete facade and dark, blue-tinted windows. Monorail tracks are visible in the foreground.	Paradise	1969–1979	375 (114)	30	36°8′10.98″N 115°9′6.3″W	Originally opened as the International Hotel in 1969.; Known as the Las Vegas Hilton from 1970 until 2012, when it became LVH – Las Vegas Hotel and Casino.; Renamed as the Westgate Las Vegas Resort & Casino in 2014.
Sundance Hotel/Fitzgeralds Hotel and Casino	Ground-level view of the front entrance to a casino; a very prominent, colorful sign features a rainbow and a pot-of-gold. There are slot machines inside the building, and glass windows and part of a skyscraper are visible above the sign.	Las Vegas	1979–1997	400 (122)	34	36°10′11.33″N 115°8′33.59″W	Originally opened as the Sundance Hotel in 1979.; Renamed as Fitzgeralds Hotel and Casino in 1987.; Renamed as The D Las Vegas in 2012.
New York-New York Hotel & Casino	Ground-level view of buildings replicating the New York City skyline.	Paradise	1997–2005	529 (161)	45	36°6′8.06″N 115°10′27.53″W	
Wynn Las Vegas	Ground-level view of a thin, curved building with a brown glass facade	Paradise	2005–2007	614 (187)	49	36°7′35.23″N 115°9′56.55″W	
The Palazzo	Ground-level view of a curved building with a tan facade. The building has dark windows and several protruding ledges at various points.	Paradise	2007–2008	642 (196)	50	36°7′26.69″N 115°10′4.35″W	
Fontainebleau Las Vegas	The Fontainebleau Resort under construction in 2009 from the south.	Winchester	2008–present	737 (224)	68	36°8′15.97″N 115°9′33.92″W	

== See also ==
- List of tallest buildings in Las Vegas
- Crown Las Vegas, a cancelled skyscraper that would have been the tallest building in the state
