= John H. Reese =

American writer

- Born: December 18, 1910; Sweetwater, Nebraska, United States
- Died: August 15, 1981 (aged 70); Santa Maria, California, United States
- Occupation: Author
- Writing career
- Period: 1934–1981
- Notable works: Big Mutt, Halter-Broke
- Literary movement: Western fiction, Crime Fiction, Children's Fiction

John Henry Reese (18 December 1910 – 15 August 1981) was an American author, mainly of Western and Crime Fiction. He won the prestigious 1952 New York Herald Tribune award for his first children's book, Big Mutt. He produced more than 40 Western novels and more than three hundred short stories. His first novel Sheehan's Mill, not of the Western genre, was published by Doubleday in 1943, during wartime publishing restrictions.

== Personal life ==
Reese was born in Sweetwater, Nebraska, and died in Santa Maria, California. He attended school in Nebraska and Kansas. "I was the eldest of six children of a very poor couple. My father was a horse breaker and former cavalryman; my mother was the daughter of a frontier blacksmith and woodworker. I may be the last professional writer who talked to those survivors of the 1880s and 1890s and who grew up in the same environment. It was a specialized education for one job alone, the one I have." He married Margaret Smith in 1938, was divorced, and married Norma Spivack in 1962. Altogether he had seven children, one of whom was adopted. In addition to writing, John H. Reese worked for the U.S. Department of Internal Revenue and as a reporter for the Los Angeles Examiner in California and as a free-lance reporter for newspapers in Mexico. His first Western novel was Signal Guns At Sunup using the pseudonym John Jo Carpenter. He is survived by his granddaughter Kimberly who is also a published author.

== Writing ==
Reese finished high school, but considered himself "self-taught". He began writing primarily western stories for pulp magazines during the 1930s. His westerns appeared in such magazines as 10 Story Western, Ace High, Argosy, Big Book Western, Dime Western Magazine, and Ranch Romances. His mysteries appeared in such magazines as Black Mask, Detective Tales, Speed Detective, Super Detective, Ellery Queen's and Alfred Hitchcock's Mystery Magazine. He also wrote for the pulp magazine Man from U.N.C.L.E. in the 1960s. He graduated to writing for slick and glossy magazines and sold stories to The Saturday Evening Post, Atlantic Monthly, Collier's, and Playboy. He was a major freelance contributor to The Saturday Evening Post for 18 years (1944–1962). Reese was "delighted in good prose and was a fine stylist himself". Sheehan's Mill was described as "a first novel with unexpected approach and fresh personal style".

Big Mutt, Reese's first children's book, was about a sheep dog in the badlands of North Dakota. It won the 1952 New York Herald Tribune award for best children's book. He continued to write children's books through the 1960s, but thereafter concentrated on his Westerns. The Jesus on Horseback trilogy is considered his best work. Among his many pseudonyms are: Eddie Abbott, John Jo Carpenter, Camford Cheavly, Camford Sheaveley, Camford Sheavely, and Cody Kennedy Jr. The John H. Reese manuscript collection is located at the American Heritage Center (formerly the Western History Research Center) at the University of Wyoming in Laramie. Several of his Western stories were adapted into movies, including Good Day for a Hanging (1959) from the short story The Reluctant Hangman, and The Young Land (1959) based upon the short story Frontier Frenzy. The movie Charley Varrick (1973) was based on his crime novel The Looters, His stories were the basis for many radio and television broadcasts, including NBC's Theatre Newsstand Radio Broadcast, ABC's Five Star Matinee Radio Broadcast, and The DuPont Show of the Week.

== Westerns ==
- Signal Guns at Sunup, 1950, (as John Jo Carpenter)
- The High Passes, 1954.
- Rich Man's Range, 1966.
- Sunblind Range, 1968.
- Sure Shot Shapiro, 1968.
- Singalee, 1969.
- Horses, Honor, and Women, 1970.
- Sierra Showdown, 1971.
- Jesus on Horseback: The Mooney County Saga, 1971 (a trilogy; separately published as Angel Range, The Blowholers, and The Land Baron, 1973–74; The Blowholers was reprinted in 1975 as Lonesome Cowboy).
- Big Hitch, 1972.
- Springfield .45-70, 1972.
- The Wild One, 1972.
- They Don't Shoot Cowards, 1973.
- Weapon Heavy, 1973 (1st in the Jefferson Hewitt series)
- The Sharpshooter, 1974.(2nd in the Jefferson Hewitt series)
- Texas Gold, 1975. (3rd in the Jefferson Hewitt series)
- Wes Hardin's Gun, 1975. (4th in the Jefferson Hewitt series)
- Hangman's Springs, 1976. (5th in the Jefferson Hewitt series)
- Sequoia Shootout, 1977. (6th in the Jefferson Hewitt series)
- The Cherokee Diamondback, 1977. (7th in the Jefferson Hewitt series)
- Dead Eye, 1978. (8th in the Jefferson Hewitt series)
- A Pair of Deuces, 1978. (9th in the Jefferson Hewitt series)
- Two Thieves and a Puma, 1980. (10th in the Jefferson Hewitt series)
- Blacksnake Man, 1976.
- A Sheriff for All the People, 1976.
- Omar, Fats, and Trixie, 1976.
- Halter-Broke, 1977.
- Rich Man's Range, 1978.
- Legacy of a Land Hog, 1979.
- Maximum Range, 1981.
- This Wild Land, 1979. (as Cody Kennedy Jr.) (Shepherd Family Series, Book 1)
- The Warrior Flame, 1980. (as Cody Kennedy Jr.) (Shepherd Family Series, Book 2)
- The Conquering Clan, 1980. (as Cody Kennedy Jr.) (Shepherd Family Series, Book 3)

== Other works ==
John Henry Reese's other works include:

- Sheehan's Mill, 1943. (a novel, published by Doubleday)
- Rainmaker, 1949. (science fiction, short story)
- Big Mutt, 1952. (for children) (winner 1952 New York Herald Tribune award for best children's book)
- The Shouting Duke: A Story Scientifically Calibrated to the Taste, Needs, and Emotional Development of the Nine to Ninety Age Groups, 1952. (for children)
- Three Wild Ones, 1963. (for children)
- Dinky, 1964. (for children)
- The Looters, 1968. (a crime fiction novel)
- Pity Us All, 1969. (a crime fiction novel)
