= Charley Varrick =

1973 film by Don Siegel

- Film poster
- Directed by: Don Siegel
- Written by: Dean Riesner; Howard Rodman
- Based on: The Looters; 1968 novel by John H. Reese
- Produced by: Don Siegel
- Starring: Walter Matthau; Andrew Robinson; Joe Don Baker; John Vernon; Felicia Farr
- Cinematography: Michael C. Butler
- Edited by: Frank Morriss
- Music by: Lalo Schifrin
- Color process: Technicolor
- Production company: Universal Pictures
- Distributed by: Universal Pictures
- Release date: October 19, 1973
- Running time: 111 minutes
- Country: United States
- Language: English

Charley Varrick (a.k.a.The Last of the Independents and Kill Charley Varrick) is a 1973 American neo-noir crime film directed by Don Siegel and starring Walter Matthau, Andrew Robinson, Joe Don Baker, and John Vernon. Charley Varrick is based on the novel The Looters by John H. Reese and is the first of four consecutive films in which Matthau appeared that were not comedies (although his role in Earthquake is comedic).

== Plot ==
Charley Varrick is a crop duster and former stunt pilot, down on his luck. His wife, two accomplices, Al and Harman, and he rob a bank in rural New Mexico. Though the heist results in a big haul, it also claims the lives of Al and Charley's wife. After making their way to a distant trailer park, Charley and Harman discover their take from the bank totals over three-quarters of a million dollars. Later, when a local TV newscast reports that less than $2,000 were stolen, Charley concludes that the bank's cover-up of the actual amount can only mean it was a drop point for laundered Mafia cash. Moreover, since they have tapped into that large underworld cash flow, whether by accident or not, Charley and Harman will soon wind up on a gangland hit list.

Though Charley is in mourning over his wife's death, he wastes no time in taking action. First, he breaks into his dentist's office, swapping his X-rays with Harman's. Later, he arranges for new passports through a local photographer. While Charley prepares for a quick getaway, however, a Reno, Nevada, gangland associate named Boyle hires a sadistic contract murderer, referred to as "Molly", to return the stolen cash to its owners.

Molly's search eventually leads him to Harman in the trailer park. He tortures Harman to get information about the money, then beats him to death. At the same time, Boyle travels to the site of the robbery to meet secretly with the bank manager, Harold Young. Boyle advises Young that his Mafia superiors will suspect the robbery was an inside job because it occurred during a brief period when the money was there. He suggests that Young will be tortured. A terrified Young later commits suicide.

After discovering Harman's corpse in the trailer home, Charley flies his cropduster to Reno, where he contacts Boyle's secretary. She warns Charley not to trust her boss. Charley then phones Boyle, offering to return the stolen money. He arranges a meeting at a remote junkyard and insists that Boyle come alone. Charley, suspecting betrayal, overflies the wrecking yard and spots Molly's car. After landing, Charley hugs the confounded Boyle, acting overjoyed. From a distance, Molly falls for the ruse and assumes that Boyle is Charley's partner-in-crime, so he runs Boyle down with his car, killing him. Molly then chases Charley, who tries to fly away, but instead flips his plane over.

Trapped in the wreckage, Charley tells Molly the money is in the trunk of a nearby car. Molly opens the trunk and sees Harman's body, wearing Charley's wedding band, and the bank satchels; an instant later, he is killed by a booby trap. Charley releases himself from the plane's wreckage and throws a wad of $100 bills toward the burning car. He then gets in a car and drives away, assured that Harman's burnt corpse and dental plates will be mistaken for his own.

== Cast ==
- Walter Matthau as Charley Varrick
- Andy Robinson as Harman Sullivan
- Joe Don Baker as Molly
- John Vernon as Maynard Boyle
- Sheree North as Jewell Everett
- Felicia Farr as Sybil Fort
- Norman Fell as Garfinkle
- Woodrow Parfrey as Harold Young
- William Schallert as Sheriff Horton
- Jacqueline Scott as Nadine Varrick
- Benson Fong as Honest John
- Marjorie Bennett as Mrs. Taft
- Tom Tully as Tom
- Kathleen O'Malley as Jessie
- Albert Popwell as Randolph Percy
- Bob Steele as Bank Guard (uncredited)
- Don Siegel as Murphy
- Joe Conforte as himself
- James Nolan as Clerk

== Production ==
Director Don Siegel wanted Varrick's company's motto, "Last of the Independents", to be the title of the film. The motto appears on the film poster and briefly as a subtitle in the film trailer.

When the mob hit man, Molly, arrives at Jewell's photo studio and introduces himself, Jewell sarcastically replies, "Yeah, I didn't figure you for Clint Eastwood". The role of Varrick was written specifically for Eastwood, who after initially accepting the role, ultimately turned it down, reportedly because he believed the character to have no redeeming features.

Matthau was also reported to have been unimpressed by the film, and Siegel later claimed that Matthau hurt the film's box-office performance by publicly stating that he neither liked the film nor understood what it was about. Matthau sent Siegel a note that said, "I have seen it three times, and am of slightly better than average intelligence (IQ 120), but I still don't quite understand what's going on. Is there a device we can use to explain to people what they're seeing?"

Varrick's aircraft was a converted Boeing PT-17 Stearman Kaydet (N53039) cropduster flown by Hollywood aerial pilot Frank Tallman. The modified cropduster belonged to a California agricultural spraying business. This same aircraft crashed in Oakdale, California, on December 31, 1976, killing the pilot, who was crop dusting. The plane's wing caught an power wire and crashed.

=== Locations ===
Director Don Siegel filmed several of his movies in Northern Nevada, including Charley Varrick, The Shootist, and Jinxed! Charley Varrick was set in New Mexico, but was filmed primarily in two small Nevada towns, Dayton and Genoa. Both towns lay a claim to being the oldest towns in Nevada. The opening bank robbery exterior scenes were filmed in Genoa, Nevada, at the old Douglas County Court House. The sheriff's chase of Varrick and his gang was filmed nearby on Genoa Lane, and Kingsbury Grade, the highway to South Lake Tahoe, Nevada State Route 207.

The interior bank scenes were filmed in Minden, Nevada. The trailer park scenes were filmed in Dayton, Nevada, by US Route 50 at the trailer park, still located near the Red Hawk Casino (closed in 2008), and the Carson River, at the southwest corner of Hart and Louie Streets. The photographer's studio and gun store scenes were filmed in Gardnerville. The cropduster flight scenes at the film's conclusion were filmed at the now-closed City Auto Wrecking, east of Sparks, near Lockwood, Nevada, by Canyon Way Road.

The Reno filming locations included a Chinese restaurant formerly located at 538 South Virginia Street, and the high-rise condominium where Varrick meets Sybil Fort was filmed at the Arlington Towers condominiums, 100 N. Arlington Avenue.

== Reception ==
On Rotten Tomatoes, the film holds a rating of 82% from 28 reviews with the consensus: "With Walter Matthau adding hangdog soul to Don Siegel's propulsive direction, Charley Varrick is a crime thriller that really scores."

"The 'normal' world—the terrain Siegel usually works in— is depicted by him as not at all normal…the characters are counterpoised against an environment which is as deranged as they are. The straight world is as phony, dishonest and evil as the criminal's, without the one qualification which may be an improvement on the normal: they [the criminals] are honest about their lawlessness…"—Biographer Judith M. Kass in Don Siegel: The Hollywood Professionals, Vol. 4 (1975)

Although critically very well received, the film underperformed at the box office, but still turned out to be a modest hit. Reviewer Paul Tatara describes Charley Varrick as "intelligent, commercial filmmaking at its finest. They rarely make them like this anymore."

Vincent Canby, in his review for The New York Times, considered Charley Varrick both an action film and a mystery:

An intelligent action melodrama is probably one of the most difficult kinds of film to make. Intelligence in this case has nothing to do with being literate, poetic, or even reasonable. It has to do with movement, suspense, and sudden changes in fortune that are plausible enough to entertain without challenging you to question basic premises. If you start asking whether such-and-such could really have happened, or if so-and-so would have acted in a certain way, the action film falls apart.

John Simon at New York magazine said that Charley Varrick is one of the more accomplished specimens of the gangster genre.

While not strictly a "remake", 2 Guns (2013) has many of its film elements lifted from Charley Varrick.

== Awards ==
Matthau won the 1974 British Academy of Film and Television Arts Awards for Best Actor in Charley Varrick. In addition, Frank Morriss was nominated for the 1974 British Academy of Film and Television Arts Awards for Best Editing.

== Home media ==
Charley Varrick was released as a Region 1 DVD with no extras on December 28, 2004. On February 14, 2008, the film was released as a Region 2 DVD in Europe in widescreen with some special features. Both DVD versions are uncut. On March 19, 2015, the film was released as a Region-B locked Blu-ray in Germany. This edition includes a 72-minute documentary on the making of the film, titled "Last of the Independents: Don Siegel and the Making of Charley Varrick".

On November 12, 2019, the film was released in a Region-A locked Blu-ray by Kino Lorber with an exclusive new 4K remaster. This edition includes the "Last of the Independents" documentary, "Refracted Personae", a new video essay with critic Howard S Berger, an archival episode of "Trailers from Hell", and a new audio commentary with critic Toby Roan.

== Cultural impact ==
According to Rory Gallagher's long-time bassist Gerry McAvoy, in his book Riding Shotgun: 35 Years on the Road with Rory Gallagher and 'Nine Below Zero', Gallagher's 1978 song "Last of the Independents" was inspired by Charley Varrick. The "Last of The Independents" logo appears in the film on the back of the Varrick company's jumpsuits and on his truck.

== See also ==
- List of American films of 1973
