= George A. Ferris & Son =

George A. Ferris & Son was an architectural firm in Reno, Nevada, consisting of partners George Ashmead Ferris (1859-1948) and his son Lehman "Monk" Ferris (1893-1996). The partnership lasted from just 1928 to 1932; both father and son however were individually prominent.

A number of the firm's or individual Ferris works are listed on the U.S. National Register of Historic Places. Lehman served as Reno, Nevada's first building inspector and participated in efforts to create a uniform building code nationwide. He also served as the first chairman of the Nevada State Board of Architecture.

Works by the firm or either partner include:

- Alpha Tau Omega Fraternity House, 205 University Terrace, Reno, NV (Ferris, Lehman "Monk"), NRHP-listed
- Carson City Civic Auditorium, 813 N. Carson St., Carson City, Nevada (Ferris, Lehman A.), NRHP-listed
- El Cortez Hotel, 239 W. 2nd St., Reno, Nevada (Ferris, George A., & Son), NRHP-listed
- Governor's Mansion, 606 Mountain St., Carson City, Nevada (Ferris, George A.), NRHP-listed
- Lander County High School, 130 Sixth St., Austin, Nevada (Ferris, George A., and Son), NRHP-listed
- Las Vegas High School Academic Building and Gymnasium, 315 S. Seventh St., Las Vegas, Nevada (Ferris, George A. & Son), NRHP-listed
- McKinley Park School, Riverside Dr. and Keystone Ave., Reno, Nevada (Ferris, George), NRHP-listed
