= McKinley Park School =

- U.S. National Register of Historic Places
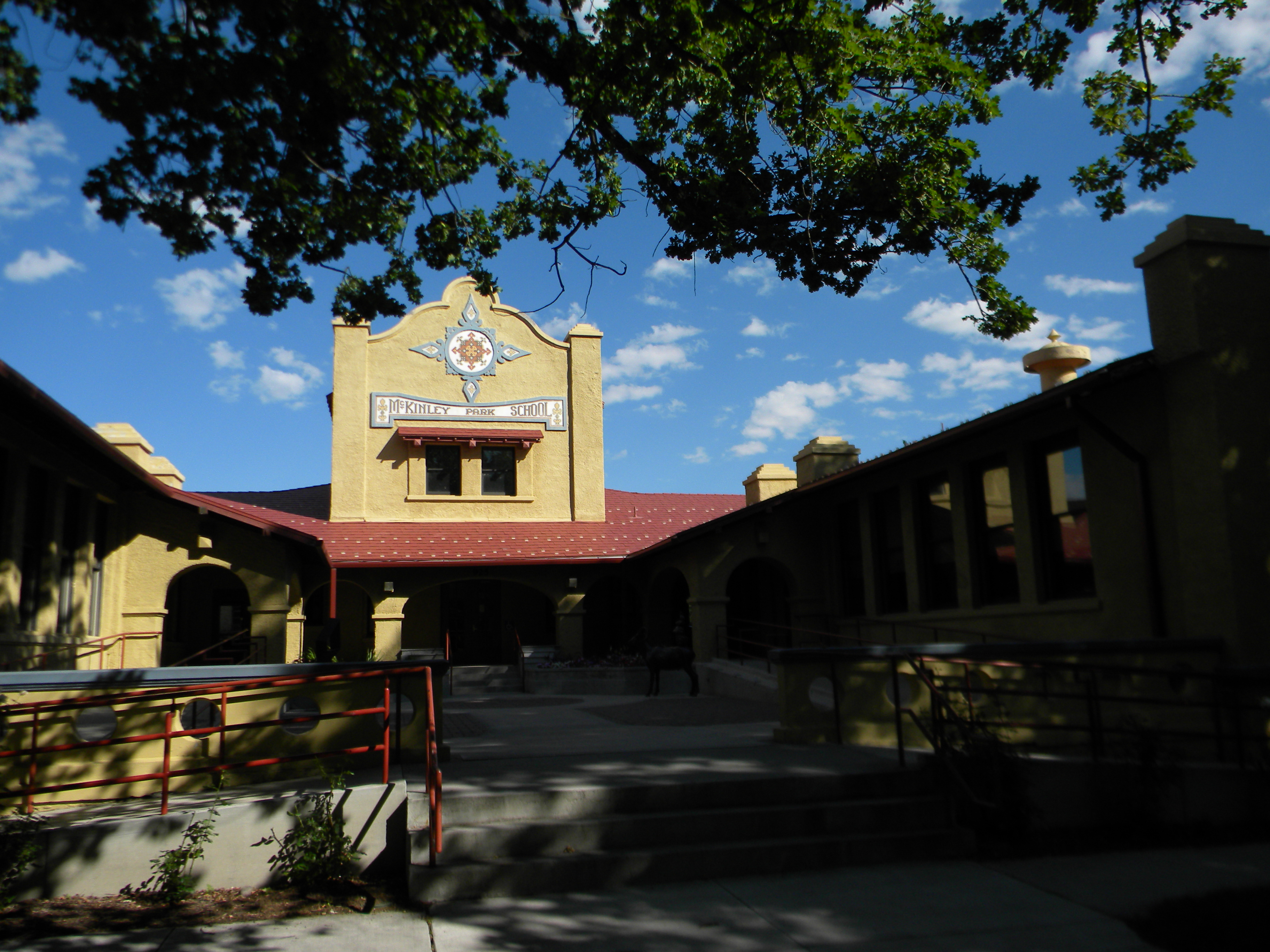

- Location within Nevada Location within the United States
- Location: Riverside Dr. and Keystone Ave., Reno, Nevada
- Coordinates: 39°31′17″N 119°49′26″W
- Area: 2.7 acres (1.1 ha)
- Built: 1909
- Architect: Ferris, George A.
- Architectural style: Mission/Spanish Revival
- NRHP reference No.: 85002406
- Added to NRHP: September 16, 1985

The McKinley Park School, at Riverside Drive and Keystone Avenue in Reno, Nevada, USA, is a historic school building that was built in 1909. It includes Mission/Spanish Revival architecture and was designed by George Ferris. Also known as the City of Reno, Recreation Center, it was listed on the National Register of Historic Places in 1985.

It is a U-shaped 150-by-160-foot (46 m × 49 m) building with a south-facing courtyard. It is close in design to that of the NRHP-listed Mt. Rose Elementary School; with two more schools that no longer exist these make up a "so-called 'Spanish Quartet'" of four Reno schools built with the same Mission Revival style during 1909–12, when Reno was rapidly growing.

In 1985, the building was used by the City of Reno for offices for its recreation program.
