= El Cortez (Reno) =

- El Cortez Hotel
- U.S. National Register of Historic Places
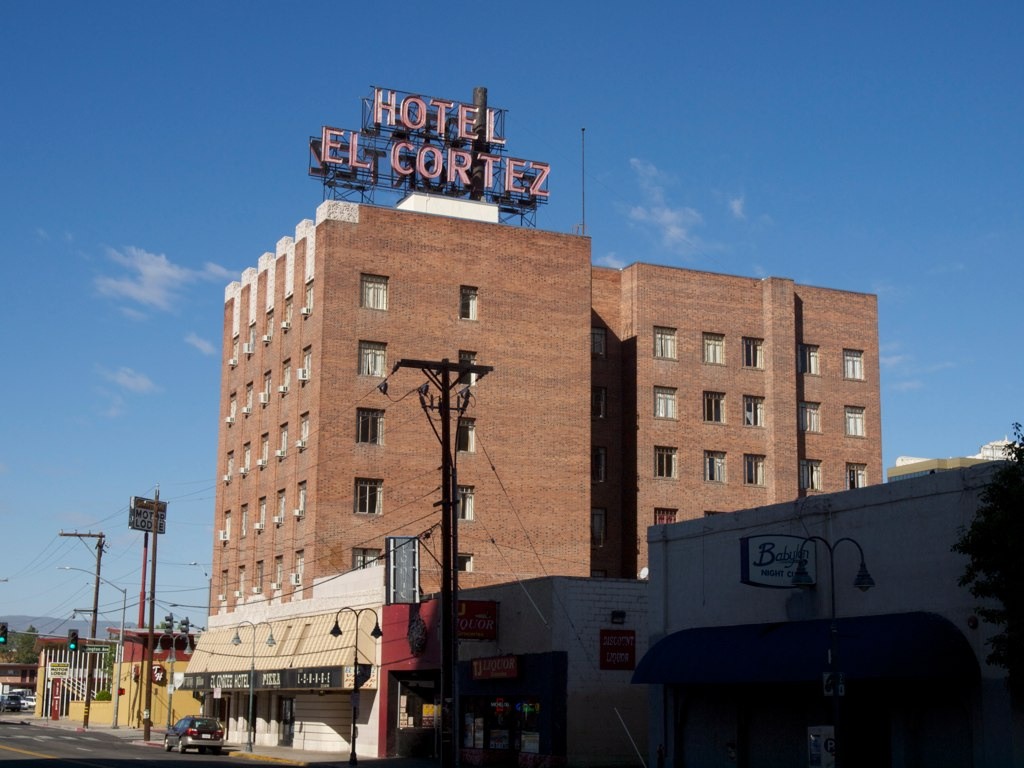
- Hotel in 2012

- Location within Nevada Location within the United States
- Location: 239 W. 2nd St., Reno, Nevada
- Coordinates: 39°31′36″N 119°48′57″W
- Area: less than one acre
- Built: 1931
- Architect: George A. Ferris & Son
- Architectural style: Art Deco
- NRHP reference No.: 84002078
- Added to NRHP: June 13, 1984

The El Cortez Hotel, at 239 W. 2nd St. in Reno, Nevada, is a historic Art Deco-style hotel that was built in 1931 by Reno real estate investor Abe Zetoony. It was designed by Reno architects George A. Ferris & Son It was listed on the National Register of Historic Places in 1984.

It was deemed significant as a fine example of Art Deco architecture and of the work of the Ferris firm. Seven stories tall, it was the tallest building in Nevada until the completion of Reno's Mapes Hotel in 1947. It is decorated with low-relief terra cotta work. The Trocadero Casino was located inside the El Cortez from 1941 to 1951. For many years, the El Cortez still served as a hotel.

El Cortez was purchased by The Siegel Group in 2014.

El Cortez (Reno) has no connection with El Cortez (Las Vegas).
