= International Hotel (Virginia City) =

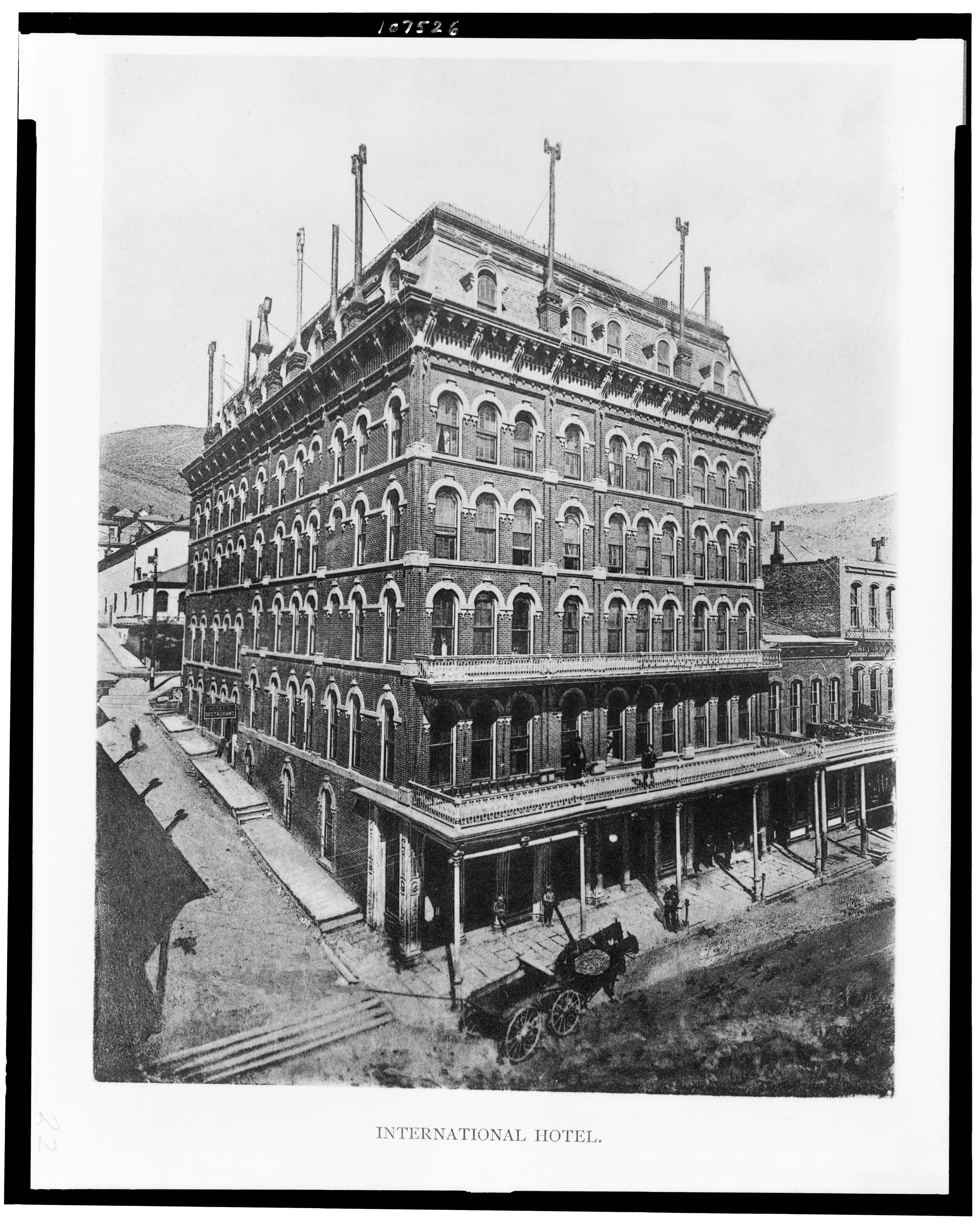
- International Hotel in 1890
- Interactive map of the International Hotel area

General information
- Status: Destroyed
- Type: Hotel
- Location: Virginia City, Nevada, United States
- Coordinates: 39.310985°N 119.649803°W
- Construction started: May 1876
- Opened: March 31, 1877
- Destroyed: December 12, 1914
- Cost: $600,000

Height
- Height: 109 feet (33 m)

Technical details
- Floor count: 6

Other information
- Number of rooms: 160

The International Hotel was a hotel located in Virginia City, Nevada. The hotel initially opened as a wooden one-story building in 1860. Two years later, a three-story brick addition was added to the hotel. The wooden portion was dismantled in 1863, and was used to construct a new International Hotel in Austin, Nevada, where it remained operational as of 2025. A four-story brick addition took the place of the wooden building.

The International Hotel burned down in the "Great Fire of 1875". A new International Hotel began construction the following year, and opened with 160 rooms on March 31, 1877. At six stories, the hotel was the tallest building in Nevada until a fire destroyed it in December 1914. The site of the former hotel became a parking lot.

== History ==
=== Original buildings ===
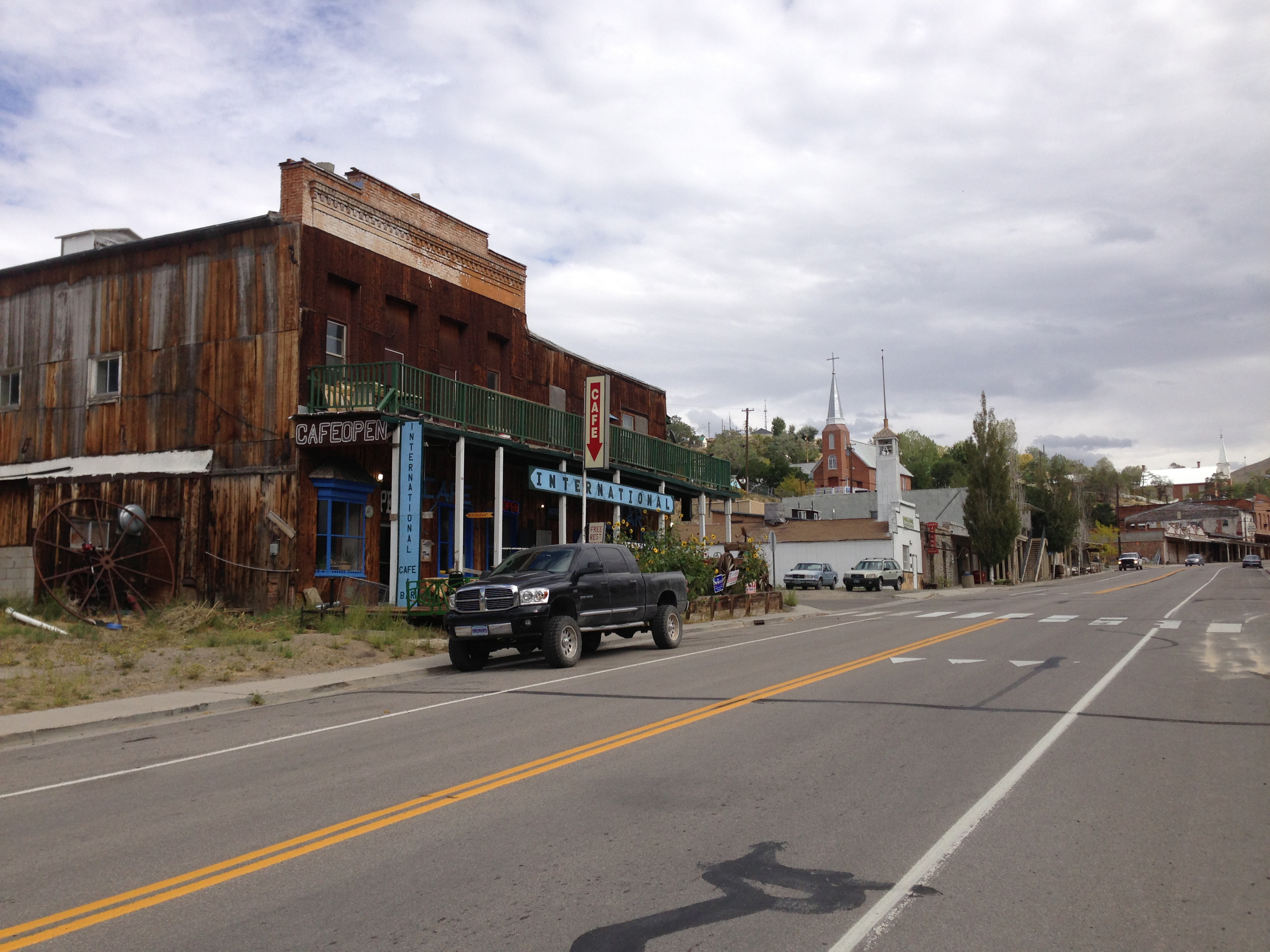
The International Hotel in Austin, Nevada (2014)

The original International Hotel was constructed during the winter of 1859, and opened in Virginia City, Nevada on March 24, 1860. The hotel, owned by Andrew Paul and Dan Connell, earned $700 in revenue on its first day. The hotel was located on Union Street, between B Street and C Street. The building faced B Street, and was made of rough-hewn timbers that had been cut from the nearby Six Mile Canyon. The single-story hotel consisted of 12 rooms, a dining room, and a bar. The bar and hotel rooms were located in the basement.

By 1862, it was determined that Virginia City would become a permanent city because of the Comstock mines. That year, construction began on a new three-story brick hotel addition, located on C Street and connected to the original wooden building. The entrance of the new building, 40 feet (12 m) long, was leased to two merchants.

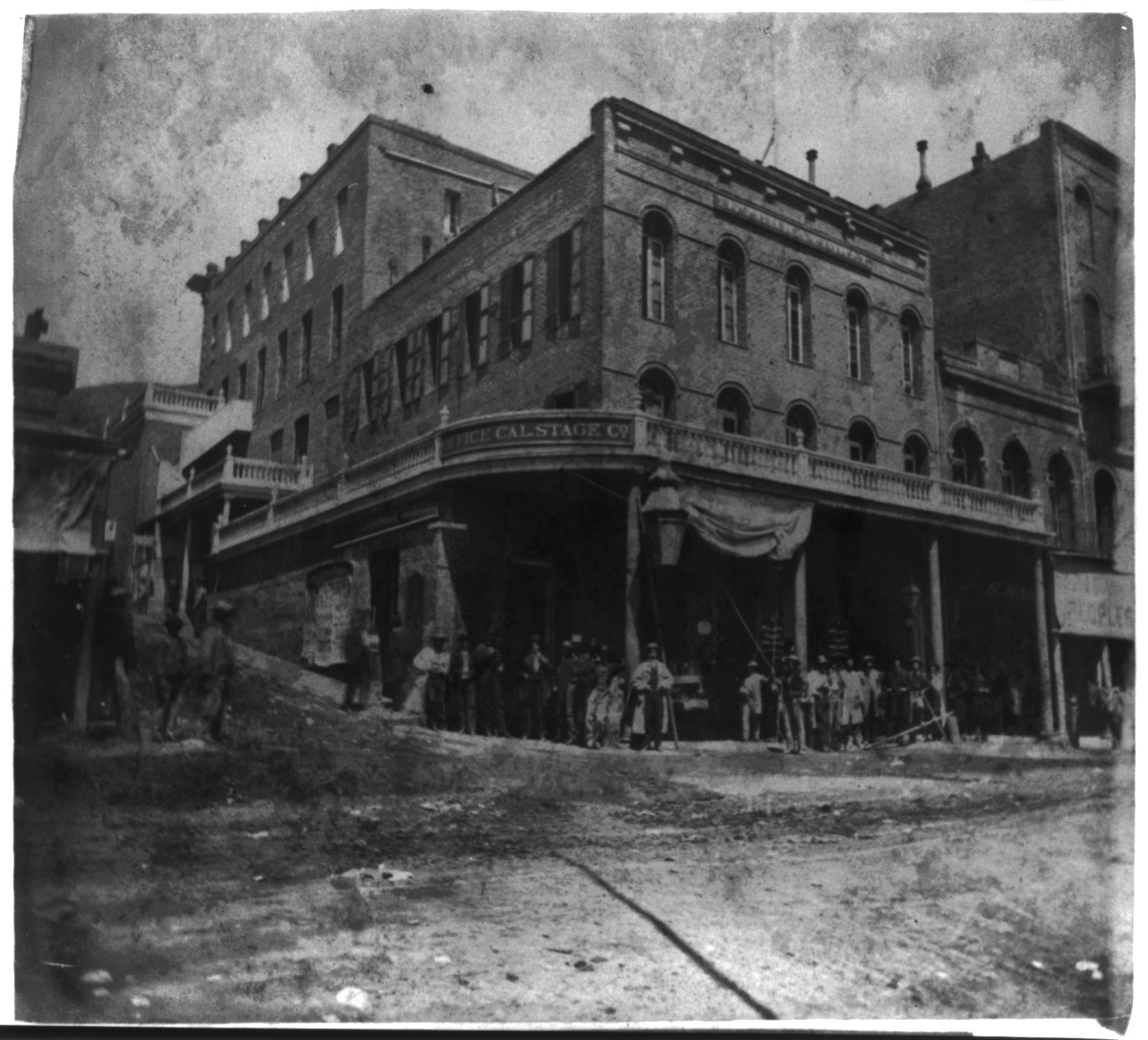
The 1862 building, with the four-story addition behind it (1866)

In 1863, a year after the new building was complete, the original wooden portion of the hotel was dismantled and the wood was shipped to Austin, Nevada. The wood was used to construct a new International Hotel in Austin, which remains operational as of 2014.

In place of the original wooden building, a new four-story brick addition was built, becoming the hotel's main entrance. Upgrades were consistently made to the International, including the addition of gas lighting. On October 26, 1875, the hotel was destroyed by a large fire known as the "Great Fire of 1875", which also destroyed a large part of the town.

=== New building ===
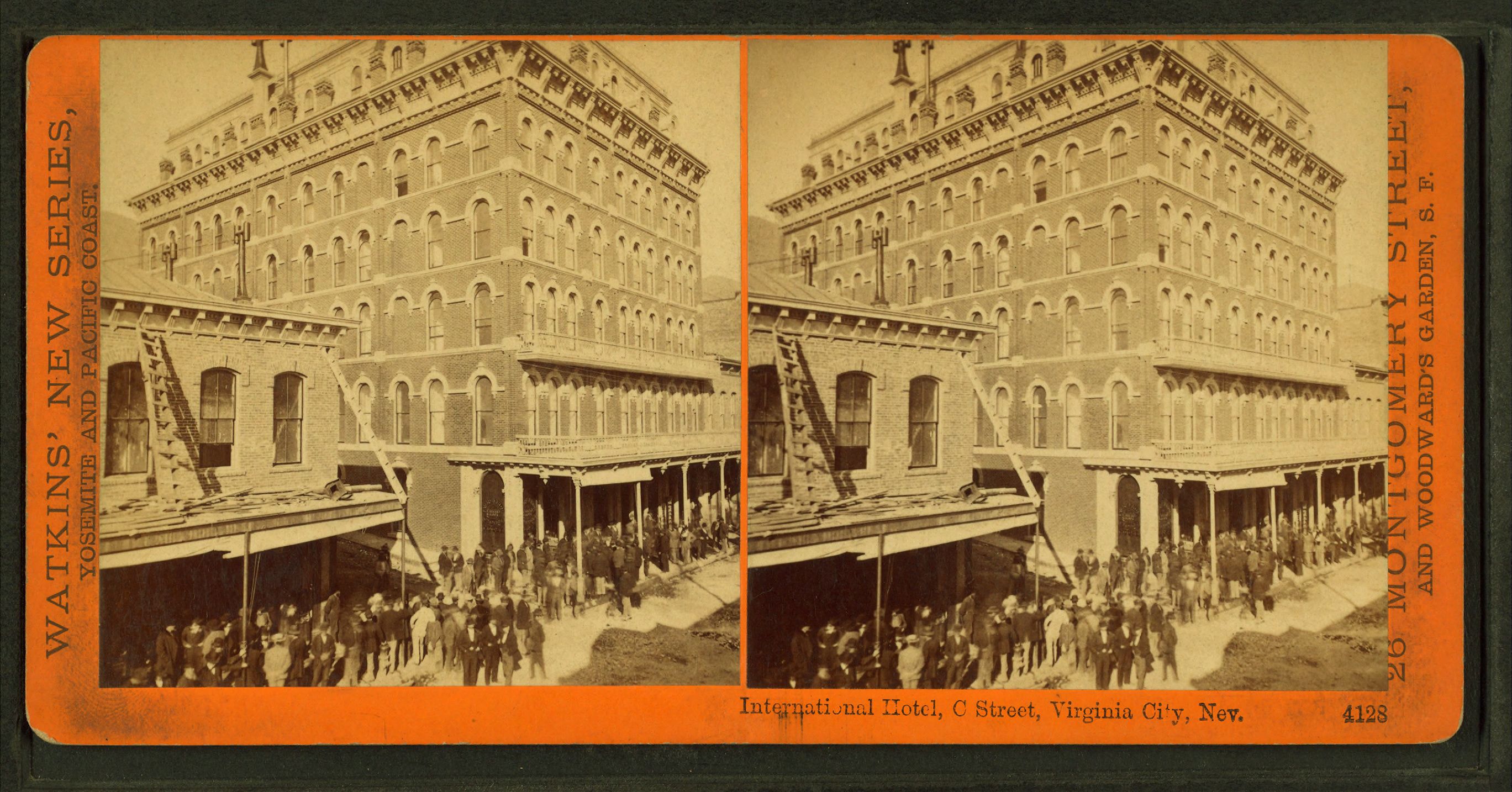
The new International Hotel

Construction of a new International Hotel began in May 1876, on the same site as the original buildings. The hotel project, modeled after the Palace Hotel in San Francisco, was financed by owners Albert Hanak and Ike Bateman. The six-story hotel stood 109 feet (33 m) high, and was built at a cost of $600,000. It opened as the tallest building in the state on the night of March 31, 1877. Attendees at the grand opening included businessmen James Graham Fair and John William Mackay, as well as U.S. Senator William Sharon and politician John Henry Kinkead.

The hotel had 160 rooms and also contained the state's first hydraulic elevator upon opening. The International was considered the most luxurious hotel in the state. First-class rooms included gas lighting and could be rented for $55 per month, while overnight stays cost $2.50. Notable visitors and guests included U.S. presidents Ulysses S. Grant, Rutherford B. Hayes and Benjamin Harrison, as well as generals William Tecumseh Sherman and Edward Lawrence Logan. Other notable visitors included Adolph Sutro and New York senator Frank C. Platt. Mackay was a permanent resident in the hotel for several years.

Technological upgrades were made to the hotel over the course of its operation, with electrical wiring being added to the hotel and the city in 1900. A large banquet was held at the hotel to mark the arrival of electricity. Hanak died in 1900, and ownership passed down to his daughter, Helena Rolfe, who lived in San Francisco. Con Ahern, a local bar owner, operated the hotel for several years.

=== Fire ===
By 1914, the hotel was suffering financially as the result of a poor local economy, caused by decreasing population and decreased interest in the Comstock Lode. A fire broke out at the hotel shortly before 5 a.m. on December 12, 1914. A dozen people were in the hotel at the time; some had to escape the hotel by descending ropes and ladders, or by leaping out of windows. The front wall was the first to come down, followed by the rear, north and south walls. The north wall fell into an adjacent building, while falling bricks and debris from the hotel's south side damaged another building. Nearby buildings also lost windows because of the intense heat of the fire. The hotel was destroyed in an hour and a half. The cause of the fire, as well as its starting point, were never definitively known. The building had been insured for $2,500.

In late January 1915, county commissioners requested that Rolfe remove the leftover debris and ruins of the hotel, which were considered an eyesore and a detriment. The following month, Rolfe noted the possibility that the foundation of the former International Hotel could be used for construction of a new two-story hotel on the site, with the ground floor being used for shops, although such plans never materialized. Removal of the hotel ruins began on February 26, 1915, with a crew consisting of six men. The crew would also be on the lookout for the body of Paul Pinet, a missing jewelry salesman who may have died in the fire. The body of an unidentified man was eventually found months after the fire. The brick and charred wood remains of the hotel were thrown into a pile on the site formerly occupied by the building, and the pile was left there for the next two decades.

==== Aftermath ====
In December 1933, George Harris was the owner of the property. By that time, Harris had the site cleared of the hotel remains, as he was planning to construct a large garage on the site. As of 2004, the site is a parking lot.

== See also ==
- Northern Hotel (Nevada)
