= George Wingfield =

American cattleman (1876–1959)

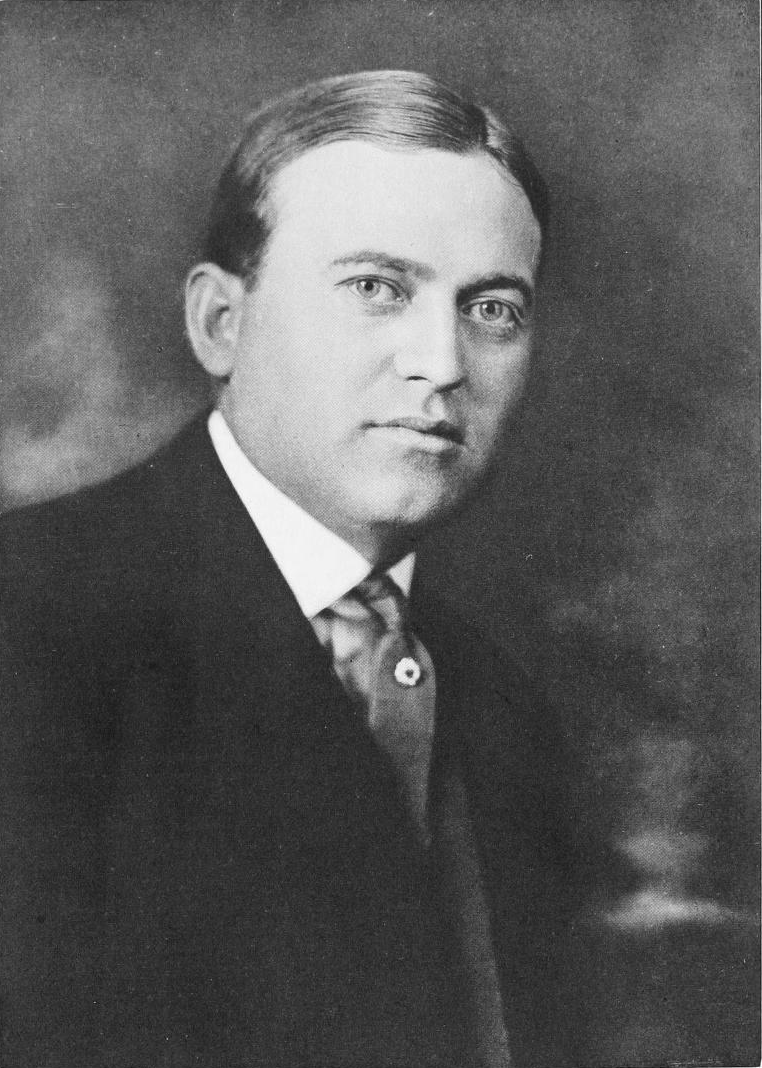
- Born: August 16, 1876; Fort Smith, Arkansas, US
- Died: December 25, 1959 (aged 83); Reno, Nevada, US
- Occupations: Banker and miner
- Known for: One of the state's most powerful economic and political figures during the period from 1909 to 1932

George Wingfield (August 16, 1876 – December 25, 1959) was a Nevada cattleman and gambler who became a financier, investor and one of the state's most powerful economic and political figures during the period from 1909 to 1932. With future senator George S. Nixon as his mentor after he settled in Winnemucca in 1899, and fellow gambler John Hennessy as his partner in the mining boomtown of Tonopah after 1901, Wingfield rose from faro-dealer to become richest man in Nevada in less than five years.

== Early and family life ==
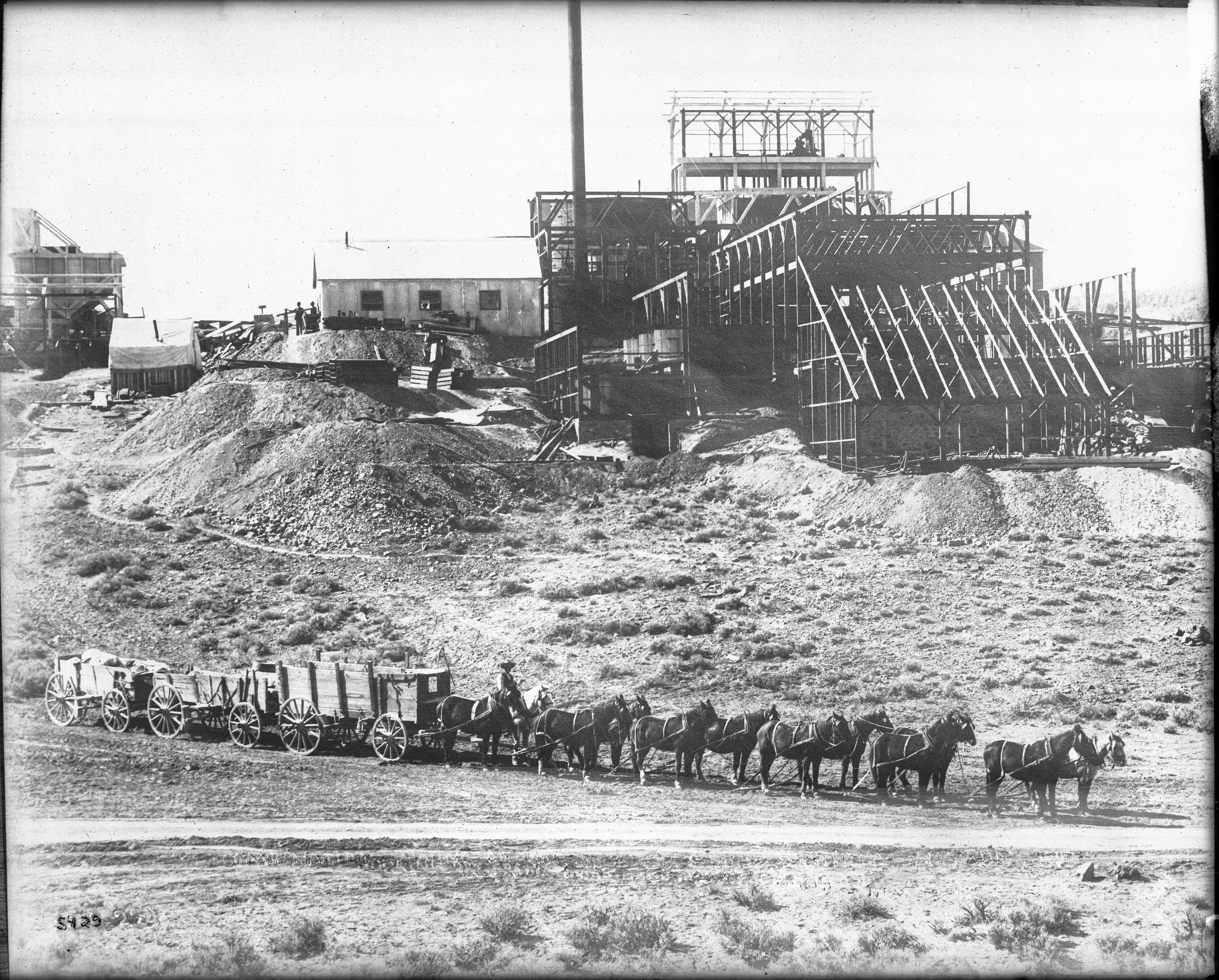
In November, 1906, the Goldfield Consolidated Mines Company was incorporated by owners George Wingfield and United States Senator George Nixon

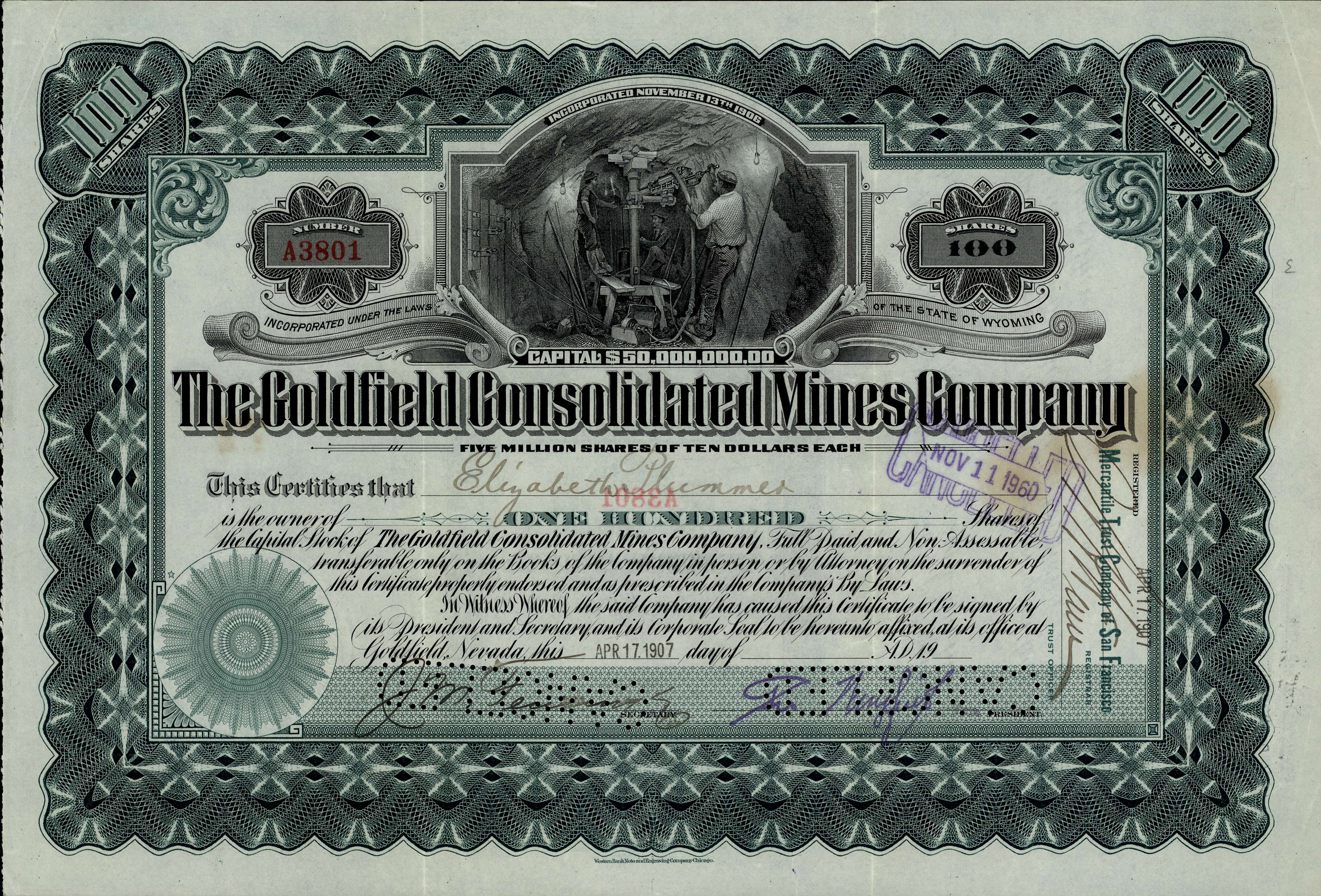
Share of the Goldfield Consolidated Mines Company, issued 17 April 1907

George Wingfield was born at Fort Smith, Arkansas in 1876 to Thomas Yates Wingfield and his wife, the former Martha Matilda Spradling. His grandfather Edward Wingfield had moved his family (including his 3 sons, William, Thomas and Henry and their families) from Albemarle County, Virginia to Fort Smith in 1853, then moved to Missouri during the American Civil War, then back to Arkansas, and would move through Nevada, but settle in Oregon, only to resettle in Arizona, where two of his sons had settled and he died in 1880. Meanwhile, Thomas Wingfield's family moved with his extended family to Oregon when young George was five years old, and he would become a buckaroo on a ranch in Burns. He married, but after he made his first fortune in 1906, as discussed below, his wife, May, filed for divorce; the couple received an annulment. He then married a divorced woman, Maud Azil Murdoch Hamlin of San Francisco, and they had a son, George Wingfield Jr. (1914-1987). Wingfield later married Roxy Thoma.

== Career ==
By age 20, Wingfield had become a cattle drover, and drove herds from Oregon and California eastward to Winnemucca in Humboldt County (in the state's northwestern corner). Winnemucca was the Humboldt county seat, as well as (approximately since the Civil War) a stop on the Southern Pacific Railroad (the transcontinental railroad which acquired the Central Pacific). It was known for a variety of businesses more hidden in respectable towns, including saloons, gambling and brothels. In Winnemucca, Wingfield met former railroad man turned banker and future United States Senator George S. Nixon, sixteen years his senior, and who became his mentor. In 1899, Wingfield decided to leave the cattle business and opened a saloon in Golconda, also in Humboldt County, but sold it by 1901.

He used the proceeds to travel south, arriving in Tonopah, then the county seat of Nye County and a town of about 250 residents, which was booming because Jim Butler had discovered silver ore and established a mine nearby in 1900. At first, Wingfield played poker and dealt cards for faro at the Tonopah Club, but by 1902, he and fellow gambler John Hennessey took over the club and soon made $200,000 in profits. By October 1902, Wingfield and Nixon formally became business partners, investing in mining and real estate. They soon owned the Boston-Tonopah Mining Company and the Nye County Bank, among other properties. By 1904, having grub-staked many miners after a gold strike the previous year about 27 miles away in Goldfield, Esmeralda County, Nevada, Wingfield moved to Goldfield, and also bought a saloon, which his millionaire mentor Nixon advised him to sell and concentrate on respectable investments, so over the next years they bought more real estate and all but one of the local mines. In 1904, Nixon became a U.S. Senator, representing the state.

By his 30th birthday in 1906 (also the year his father died in San Francisco), Wingfield had made a fortune in Nevada, based on mine ownership in Tonopah and Goldfield. After taking their Goldfield Consolidated Mining Company public in 1906 (which he and Nixon had organized with $50 million in capital), Wingfield alone was worth $30 million. However, when their Goldfield mines became an organizing target of the Industrial Workers of the World in 1907 (and knowing the IWW had called strikes elsewhere), the mine owners closed the mines. This put between 6,000 and 8000 miners out of work, which led not only to considerable publicity, but civil unrest. Nevada Governor John Sparks called up the national guard to restore order.

In 1908, Wingfield moved to Reno and became active in politics, banking, ranching, and hotel-keeping. His partnership with Nixon dissolved in 1909, with Wingfield taking the mining interests and Nixon the banks. He also invested in the Coalinga Oil Field. After Nixon's death, Wingfield bought the Golden Hotel in Reno, and he also bought the city's other major hotel (the Riverside Hotel) and the Spanish Springs hotel in Springs, would acquire many Nevada banks, and the mining company acquired international interests. Wingfield also returned to his cattle-ranching roots, operating a ranch and dairy farm in Fallon. After his mentor Nixon died in 1912, Governor Tasker Oddie appointed Wingfield to serve out the remainder of Nixon's Senate term, but after consulting with Nixon's financier friends, including Bernard Baruch and Henry Clay Frick, Wingfield turned down the appointment. He cultivated friendships in both political parties, and his businesses survived the 1923 fire which devastated Goldfield. In the 1920s Wingfield worked with legislators to make Nevada a quickie divorce location, which helped his Reno hotel businesses. He also worked to legalize gambling, illegal in many states, especially California and other destinations easily reachable by railroad. Not only his businesses in Reno, but the entire state of Nevada became a tourist destination. In 1928, Wingfield was elected to the University Board of Regents for the University of Nevada.

Much of Wingfield's fortune was lost during the Great Depression. In 1931, $500,000 in state funds were missing and Wingfield was accused of embezzling them. He put up the money himself, but soon declared bankruptcy. However, by 1935 he was rebuilding his fortune, investing in the Getchell Mine near Winnemucca. By 1955, he was ready to retire, selling his Reno security company and the Riverside Hotel.

== Death and legacy ==
George Wingfield died in Reno on December 25, 1959. His widow and son were later buried beside him in Reno. In 1992, he was inducted into the National Mining Hall of Fame in Leadville, Colorado.

Wingfield Park, alongside the Truckee River in Reno, was built on land donated by George Wingfield. Starting in 1995, a new 1,660-acre, 400-home neighborhood was constructed on the site of George Wingfield's former Spanish Springs Ranch. Red Hawk at Wingfield Springs was completed in 2005 and named after Wingfield by its developer, Harvey Whittemore.
