= List of United States post offices in Nevada =

United States post offices operate under the authority of the United States Post Office Department (1792–1971) or the United States Postal Service (since 1971). Historically, post offices were usually placed in a prominent location. Many were architecturally distinctive, including notable buildings featuring Beaux-Arts, Art Deco, and Vernacular architecture. However, modern U.S. post offices were generally designed for functionality rather than architectural style.

Following is a list of United States post offices in Nevada. Notable post offices include individual buildings, whether still in service or not, which have architectural, historical, or community-related significance. Many of these are listed on the National Register of Historic Places (NRHP) or state and local historic registers.

Post office	City	Date built	Image	Architect	Notes	Ref.
Carson City Post Office	Carson City	1888–1891		Mifflin E. Bell	(Note: Listed on the National Register of Historic Places)	
Elko Main Post Office	Elko	1933		James A. Wetmore		
United States Post Office (Ely, Nevada)	Ely	1937–1938		Louis A. Simon, Neal A. Melick		
Federal Building and Post Office (Fallon, Nevada)	Fallon	1928–1929		James A. Whetmore, Louis A. Simon		
Las Vegas Post Office and Courthouse	Las Vegas	1931–1933		James A. Wetmore		
United States Post Office-Lovelock Main	Lovelock	1937–1938		Louis A. Simon		
Micca House	Paradise Valley	1880s		Alfonso Pasquale		
Reno Main Post Office	Reno	1932–1934		Frederic J. DeLongchamps		
Tonopah Main Post Office	Tonopah	1940–1941		Louis A. Simon, Neal A. Melick		
Winnemucca Main Post Office	Winnemucca	1921, 1940–1941		James A. Wetmore, Frank Gallagher		
United States Post Office (Yerington, Nevada)	Yerington	1939		Louis A. Simon, L.F. Dow & Co		
