= My Blueberry Nights =

2007 film by Wong Kar-wai

- Theatrical release poster
- Directed by: Wong Kar-wai
- Screenplay by: Wong Kar-wai; Lawrence Block
- Story by: Wong Kar-wai
- Produced by: Jacky Pang Yee Wah; Wong Kar-wai
- Starring: Norah Jones; Jude Law; David Strathairn; Rachel Weisz; Natalie Portman
- Cinematography: Darius Khondji; Kwan Pun Leung
- Edited by: William Chang Suk Ping
- Music by: Ry Cooder
- Production companies: Block 2 Pictures; StudioCanal; Jet Tone Films
- Distributed by: Shanghai Oriental (China); StudioCanal (France); Golden Scene (Hong Kong); The Weinstein Company (United States)
- Release dates: May 16, 2007 (Cannes); November 28, 2007 (France); December 22, 2007 (China); January 3, 2008 (Hong Kong); April 4, 2008 (United States)
- Running time: 95 minutes
- Countries: China; France; Hong Kong; United States
- Language: English
- Budget: $10 million
- Box office: $22 million

My Blueberry Nights is a 2007 romantic drama film directed by Wong Kar-wai, his first feature in English. The screenplay by Wong and Lawrence Block is based on a Chinese-language short film written and directed by Wong. My Blueberry Nights stars Norah Jones (in her acting debut), Jude Law, David Strathairn, Rachel Weisz, and Natalie Portman.

== Plot ==
Jeremy, an émigré from Manchester, owns a small New York City café. He provides customer Elizabeth with clues that reveal her boyfriend is cheating on her. Devastated, she breaks up with him and becomes a regular at the diner, arriving late at night for blueberry pie and to share stories with Jeremy. One night, after they are assaulted in separate incidents, Elizabeth falls asleep at the counter. Jeremy sneaks a kiss while she sleeps and she subtly smiles. Later that night, Elizabeth stands on a curb and sadly watches her ex-boyfriend and his new girlfriend through their apartment window.

Elizabeth, now calling herself Lizzie, drifts to Memphis, Tennessee. She takes two jobs, waitress by day and bartender by night, to earn enough money to eventually purchase a car. She regularly sends postcards to Jeremy without revealing where exactly she lives or works. He tries to locate her by calling and sending postcards to all the restaurants in the area, but to no avail.

One of Elizabeth's regulars at both jobs is local police officer Arnie Copeland, an alcoholic who cannot accept that his wife, Sue Lynne, has left him. She openly flaunts her new relationship with a younger man, deepening Arnie's sorrow. He shows Elizabeth his pocketful of AA sobriety tokens and recounts his many attempts at sobriety.

One night, while off duty in Elizabeth's bar, Arnie drunkenly threatens Sue Lynne with his gun if she leaves, but he doesn't shoot her. Later on, he drives drunk, crashes into a pole and dies. Elizabeth comforts Sue Lynne at the crash site, where she had first met him, suggesting he may have committed suicide. Before both women say goodbye to the town, Sue Lynne gives her Arnie's tab money, admitting she had made a mistake and she misses him.

Heading west, Elizabeth – now Beth – gets another server job at a casino in a small town in Nevada. She meets Leslie, an inveterate poker player who has lost all her money. Elizabeth lends her $2,200 in exchange for the money back, plus a third of her winnings. However, if she loses, then Elizabeth gets Leslie's car, a new Jaguar XK. When Leslie does lose, she fulfills her promise, but asks for a lift to Las Vegas to borrow money from her estranged father.

En route, a Vegas hospital calls to inform Leslie that her father has been admitted and is dying. She believes the call is a ruse to lure her back, but upon arrival she discovers that he actually died the previous night. Leslie announces she's keeping the car, which she had stolen from her father. He had sent her the vehicle's title and registration, despite their estrangement. She confesses she actually won the poker game and subsequently helps Elizabeth negotiate the purchase of her dream car.

Elizabeth returns to Manhattan and the café, where Jeremy has kept a stool at the counter reserved for her ever since she left. As she eats a slice of blueberry pie, Elizabeth realizes her feelings for him are reciprocated. She 'passes out' on the counter after spending the night in conversation. Jeremy again steals a kiss while she is asleep, but she returns the kiss.

== Cast ==
- Norah Jones as Elizabeth (Lizzie/Beth)
- Jude Law as Jeremy
- David Strathairn as Arnie Copeland
- Rachel Weisz as Sue Lynne Copeland
- Natalie Portman as Leslie
- Chan Marshall as Katya
- John Malloy as Diner Manager
- Demetrius Butler as Male Customer
- Frankie Faison as Travis
- Adriane Lenox as Sandy
- Benjamin Kanes as Randy
- Michael Hartnett as Sunglasses
- Michael May as Aloha
- Chad Davis as Boyfriend
- Katya Blumenberg as Girlfriend

== Production ==
=== Development ===
The idea for My Blueberry Nights originated from an anthology film that Wong planned to make under the title Three Stories About Food; one of the film's chapters was ultimately released as its own film, In the Mood for Love (2000), while My Blueberry Nights originated from another short film titled In the Mood for Love 2001, which had only been screened once, at the Cannes Film Festival in 2001. Wong expanded the idea into a road movie that would take place in other locations besides New York, as filming entirely in the state would have been too expensive. Wong chose to make the film in 2005, after the postponement of another film.

=== Pre-production ===
Crew members went on three location scouting trips across the United States. Darius Khondji, the film's cinematographer, accompanied the crew on two trips, while Wong accompanied them for one; both of them took extensive photographs of diners, highways, and motels during their trips. Ely, Nevada was discovered by Wong while traveling along U.S. Route 50, and was chosen as a filming location. Ely's Hotel Nevada and Gambling Hall, as well as its Liberty Club bar, were scouted as possible filming locations. New Orleans was also considered as a filming location, but ultimately was not chosen because of logistical reasons; Memphis, Tennessee was chosen instead.

In Making My Blueberry Nights, a bonus on the DVD release of the film, Wong reveals his first choice for Elizabeth was singer Norah Jones despite her lack of prior acting experience. Wong called Norah Jones "a natural" and instructed that she not take acting lessons. Prior to filming, poker expert Peter Alson was hired to coach Natalie Portman for scenes that involved her playing poker.

=== Filming ===
Production began in New York on June 21, 2006. By June 27, 2006, production had moved to Ely, Nevada, after filming concluded in New York. Wong had Alson come along to Ely for further advice on the film's poker scenes. Filming locations in Ely included the Hotel Nevada and Gambling Hall. Other scenes in Ely were to be shot at a bar. Wong, known for last-minute decisions, chose a different bar on the day of filming, after concluding with Alson the night before that the bar in Ely was too small.

Filming in Las Vegas was set to begin on June 27, 2006, and was expected to last five days. Poker scenes set in Ely were instead filmed inside a poker room that had been constructed inside the Art Bar in downtown Las Vegas, as no suitable locations for the poker scenes could be found in Ely. Scenes involving Jones and Portman at the Art Bar were filmed over the course of a week. Other filming locations in Las Vegas included a diner, a car lot, a medical clinic, and the Blue Angel and La Palm motels, all located on East Fremont Street. Scenes were also shot in a hallway at Desert Springs Hospital.

Scenes in Memphis were scheduled to be filmed from July 17 to 21, at the Blues City Café and at the Arcade Restaurant. Wong said that the film's Memphis segment was a tribute to Tennessee Williams. Wong originally intended to shoot the film in sequence, but when he discovered Rachel Weisz, whom he wanted to cast as Sue Lynne, was pregnant, he agreed to film the Memphis scenes last to allow her time to give birth and recuperate before beginning work. Wong consistently revised existing scenes and added new scenes to the script, usually at the last minute. Jude Law called it "a living story that's still being decided."

In August 2006, filming took place at the Palacinka café on Grand Street in SoHo, Manhattan. Scenes shot at the café – the primary filming location in New York – included a kissing scene between Law and Jones that was re-shot 150 times, with different speeds and from various angles, over the course of three days. Law, speaking about Wong, said, "I've never worked with someone who's put so much emphasis on a single moment. It's extraordinary how he'll take a moment and replay it and slice it up."

Filming was completed in seven weeks. Wong returned to Hong Kong in September 2006, with most of the film finished. The Weinstein Company acquired the American distribution rights in November 2006, while the film was being edited by Wong and William Chang. Wong said he would probably return to the United States to conclude filming in the winter, but stated that he would not make a decision about additional filming until he had a first cut. The film's ending had not been decided at that time.

== Release ==
The film premiered at the Cannes Film Festival in May 2007, with David Lynch's Absurda, from the To Each His Own Cinema anthology, shown as an opening short. It was also shown at the Hamburg Film Festival, the Valladolid International Film Festival, and the Munich Asia Filmfest before going into limited theatrical release in Canada on November 16. It opened throughout Europe and Asia before opening on six screens in the United States on April 4, 2008, as a limited release. The theatrical US version was edited to be slightly shorter than the version that was premiered in 2007.

=== Home media ===
The film was released on DVD by the Weinstein Company on July 1, 2008. The film has yet to receive a Blu-ray release in the United States. The film debuted on Blu-ray on June 23, 2008 in the United Kingdom in a Region B Locked release. Shortly after, a Blu-ray was released in Japan on September 29, 2008 as a Region free disc, which also contains the extras found on the DVD.

== Reception ==
=== Box office ===
On its opening weekend, My Blueberry Nights grossed $74,146 in six theaters in the United States, ranking No. 43 at the box office. By the end of its run, the film grossed $867,275 domestically and $21,140,396 internationally, totaling $22,007,671 worldwide.

=== Critical reception ===
Review aggregation website Rotten Tomatoes collected 130 reviews and identified 45% of them as positive, with an average rating of 5.40/10. The site's critical consensus reads "Though well filmed, My Blueberry Nights is a mixed bag of dedicated performers working with thin material." On Metacritic, the film has a weighted average score of 52 based on 27 critic reviews, indicating "mixed or average reviews".

Mick LaSalle of the San Francisco Chronicle observed, "The movie's overall story is modest, and if it were any longer the film might start to drag. But at 90 minutes, it's short enough to be carried along on the drama of its individual scenes and the strength of its performances . . . The nice thing about Wong is that, like a good gambler, he knows when to bet the farm and when to hold back. Most of the time, he plays it straight, and other times he will speed up the action into a kind of blur, to indicate time passing; or he'll fade out and back into the same shot, as though to indicate renewed focus. Everything he does re-creates a state of mind. It's such a relief to realize he's doing everything for a reason and not to show off."

Meghan Keane of the New York Sun said the film "keenly displays Wong Kar Wai's aptitude for relationship drama and showcasing the female form, but the Chinese director's American debut often makes the earnest miscalculation of a dubbed foreign film . . . [I]n translating his fascination with the distances between two people into American vernacular, Mr. Wong betrays an unfamiliarity with his subject matter that often undermines his story . . . Sadly, [his] interpretation of American lives and landscapes has an alien quality to it. He fetishizes the American countryside, drowns his characters' sorrows in whiskey, and makes plot-oriented decisions based on aesthetics rather than continuity or logic. The image of beautiful women in oversize sunglasses leaning against convertibles is not an accurate depiction of Americana – but it doesn't make for a bad visual."

In Hong Kong, critical reception was generally mixed. Perry Lam of Muse Magazine compared the film to Wong's earlier work Chungking Express, finding My Blueberry Nights "a much lesser, more ordinary affair."

== Awards and nominations ==
Wong Kar Wai was nominated for the Palme D'Or at the Cannes Film Festival and for Best Foreign Film at the Cinema Writers Circle Awards in Spain.

Cannes Film Festival

| Year | Nominee / work | Award | Result |
|---|---|---|---|
| 2007 | Kar Wai Wong | Palme d'Or | Nominated |

Cinema Writers Circle Awards

| Year | Nominee / work | Award | Result |
|---|---|---|---|
| 2009 | My Blueberry Nights | Best Foreign Film | Nominated |

== Soundtrack ==
My Blueberry Nights

Soundtrack album by Various Artists
- Released: April 1, 2008
- Genre: Film soundtrack
- Label: Blue Note Records

The soundtrack, released on the Blue Note Records label, features tracks by the star of the film Norah Jones, Cat Power, Ry Cooder, Oscar-winning composer Gustavo Santaolalla, Otis Redding, Cassandra Wilson, and Amos Lee.

1. The Story – Norah Jones – 4:10
2. Living Proof – Cat Power – 3:10
3. Ely Nevada – Ry Cooder – 2:31
4. Try a Little Tenderness – Otis Redding – 3:19
5. Looking Back – Ruth Brown – 4:16
6. Long Ride – Ry Cooder – 3:13
7. Eyes on the Prize – Mavis Staples – 4:06
8. Yumeji's Theme – Chikara Tsuzuki – 2:22
9. Skipping Stone – Amos Lee – 2:21
10. Bus Ride – Ry Cooder – 2:58
11. Harvest Moon (Neil Young) – Cassandra Wilson – 4:44
12. Devil's Highway – Hello Stranger – 5:34
13. Pajaros – Gustavo Santaolalla – 2:22
14. The Greatest – Cat Power – 3:24
