= Northern Hotel (Nevada) =

- Northern Hotel, Ely, Nevada, postcard mailed on 2 April 1908
- Interactive map of the Northern Hotel area

General information
- Status: Destroyed
- Type: Hotel
- Location: Aultman Street, Ely, Nevada, United States
- Coordinates: 39.247675°N 114.893730°W
- Groundbreaking: May 1906
- Opened: January 8, 1907
- Renovated: 1957
- Destroyed: May 17, 1964 (fire)
- Cost: $110,000

Technical details
- Floor count: 3

The Northern Hotel was a three-story hotel located in Ely, Nevada. Three businessmen from Goldfield, Nevada, including Tex Rickard, commissioned the building's construction in 1906. The building was initially proposed as a three-story business block, although a decision was made during construction to open the upper floors as a hotel. The Northern Hotel opened in January 1907, and was well received, although it later closed in 1932, because of a lack of business. The Northern Hotel reopened in 1937, and was later destroyed entirely in a fire on May 17, 1964.

== History ==
=== Construction ===
In February 1906, Joseph E. Stevens and G. L. "Tex" Rickard, prominent businessmen from Goldfield, Nevada, visited Ely and became convinced that it presented profitable opportunities for them. Stevens stated that he was surprised by Ely's investment potential. That month, Stevens, Rickard, and Goldfield businessman W. S. "Ole" Elliott purchased two vacant lots for $15,000. The land was located at the corner of Aultman Street and Murray Street, and had been owned by W. B. Graham. Plans were announced that month to construct a three-story business block on the site, identical to Goldfield's Nixon Block. The men announced that the entire structure would be built to be as fire-proof as possible. The ground floor would be used for businesses, while the upper floors would be used for office space. Stevens stated that the building would be rushed to completion, regardless of the cost.

In March 1906, a sign was placed on the property, advertising the Northern, a "modern up-to-date building." "Northern", a favorite name of Rickard's, had also been applied to his casinos in Alaska and Goldfield. Groundbreaking began in early May 1906. The building began to take shape the following month, with the structure expected to be nearly completed within 30 days. The frame of the third story was installed in August 1906, with the lower floor expected to be ready for occupancy in the early half of September. First-floor occupants were to include the White Pine County Bank, as well as a saloon.

At the end of August 1906, a completion date of October 1 was given, at which point occupancy could commence. Each room in the building had already been rented. Stevens was reported to be rushing the construction to meet the completion date. On September 29, 1906, during construction, the unfinished building was used as the site of a ball to celebrate Railroad Day and the new Nevada Northern Railway.

On October 5, 1906, Rickard, Stevens, and Elliott announced that the building would be used as a hotel, and that it would take five weeks to complete and furnish. Later that month, Stevens went to Chicago to purchase furniture for the hotel, which was expected to open the following month. It was reported that the Northern would be "one of the finest hotels" in Nevada. Furnishing began at the end of November 1906, with some additional work on the structure still needed ahead of its opening. That month, the Northern Hotel Company was incorporated with a capital stock of $125,000, split between five partners, including Rickard, Elliott, Stevens, and Ely resident Thomas Rockhill. The hotel, built of wood and brick, was constructed and furnished at a cost of $110,000. Sidewalks for the building were finished on December 27, 1906.

=== Opening and operation ===
The Northern Hotel was opened on January 8, 1907, and was a financial success, generating $62,000 in profit within eight months. Rickard, Stevens, and Elliott had previously declared, upon purchase of the property, that it was a "foolish" investment. The hotel offered indoor plumbing, which included hot and cold water in each room. The hotel was well received by tourists and local residents for its luxurious features. At the time of its opening, the building also offered gambling tables, frequented by local miners. The White Pine County Bank occupied the building's lower southwest corner until February 23, 1907, when it was replaced by The First National Bank of Ely, which subsequently moved out of the building in 1908.

In 1911, H. O. "Tex" Hall leased a portion of the building for $700 and operated the Northern Bar inside. In August 1913, a bar employee drowned to death in the hotel's basement after he and several men were sent down there to salvage a large collection of alcohol and cigars from an incoming flood caused by a cloudburst. By December 1913, the Steptoe Drug store was operating within the building. In 1923, The First National Bank of Ely moved back into the Northern Hotel, occupying the northwest corner of the building's ground floor.

In March 1928, Elliott announced that he had purchased Rickard's interest in the hotel, giving him complete control. Elliott expected to add improvements and furnishings to the hotel if demand should increase. At the time, the Northern Hotel was one of the largest and most modern hotels in eastern Nevada. The Northern Hotel was Ely's leading hotel until the opening of the Hotel Nevada and Gambling Hall in 1929. Elliott closed the hotel in May 1932, because of a lack of business. The hotel briefly reopened in September 1934, to accommodate delegates attending a state Democratic convention. The hotel fully reopened in 1937. That year, The First National Bank of Ely expanded its location at the hotel. Elliott died in October 1938.

Ownership changed in May 1940, when Elliott's wife, Mae Elliott, sold her 70,000 shares of stock in the hotel to Ely residents Tom Wheelwright, Ruth Palmer, and Hazel McCartney. The remaining 30,000 shares were held by an estate. In 1952, a parking lot for the hotel was added behind the property. The First National Bank of Ely moved out of the Northern Hotel in 1956. The hotel received a modernization in 1957, which included the Northern Bar reopening in the space previously occupied by the bank. That year, the Nevada State Journal wrote: "Even today residents of Ely can startle visitors with the statement that 'Tex Rickard built the Northern'." In 1962, Wheelwright sold his share in the hotel for $20,000.

=== Fire ===
At 3:30 a.m. on May 17, 1964, a fire began near a stairwell in the rear of the building. The fire had apparently smouldered for hours, until it suddenly spread throughout the building. The fire burned out of control for five hours while it was battled by Ely's entire 35-man volunteer fire department. Rescue crews consisted of firemen and county road employees, as well as workers from a copper firm. Two cranes were provided by nearby copper mines, and were used to topple the building's upper walls so they would not collapse onto the firemen and nearby spectators. Firemen had to flee from the upper floors because of fears that the floor could collapse. One fireman was overcome by smoke inhalation, but was later released from the local hospital after being treated. Several people suffered minor injuries. At 10:30 p.m., the fire continued to burn, although it was now under control by the firemen.

The fire destroyed the entire hotel, including the businesses that operated within the building: the Northern Bar, a Western Union office, the Bishop Jewelry Shop, and an attorney's office. The Northern was considered a local landmark. A local resident who went missing after the fire was ultimately discovered to have died after search crews found his body a few days later in the hotel rubble, which measured up to 15 feet high in some areas. The search for the man's body had been slowed by hot spots still present in the hotel remains.
