= Ely Airport =

Ely Airport Yelland Field
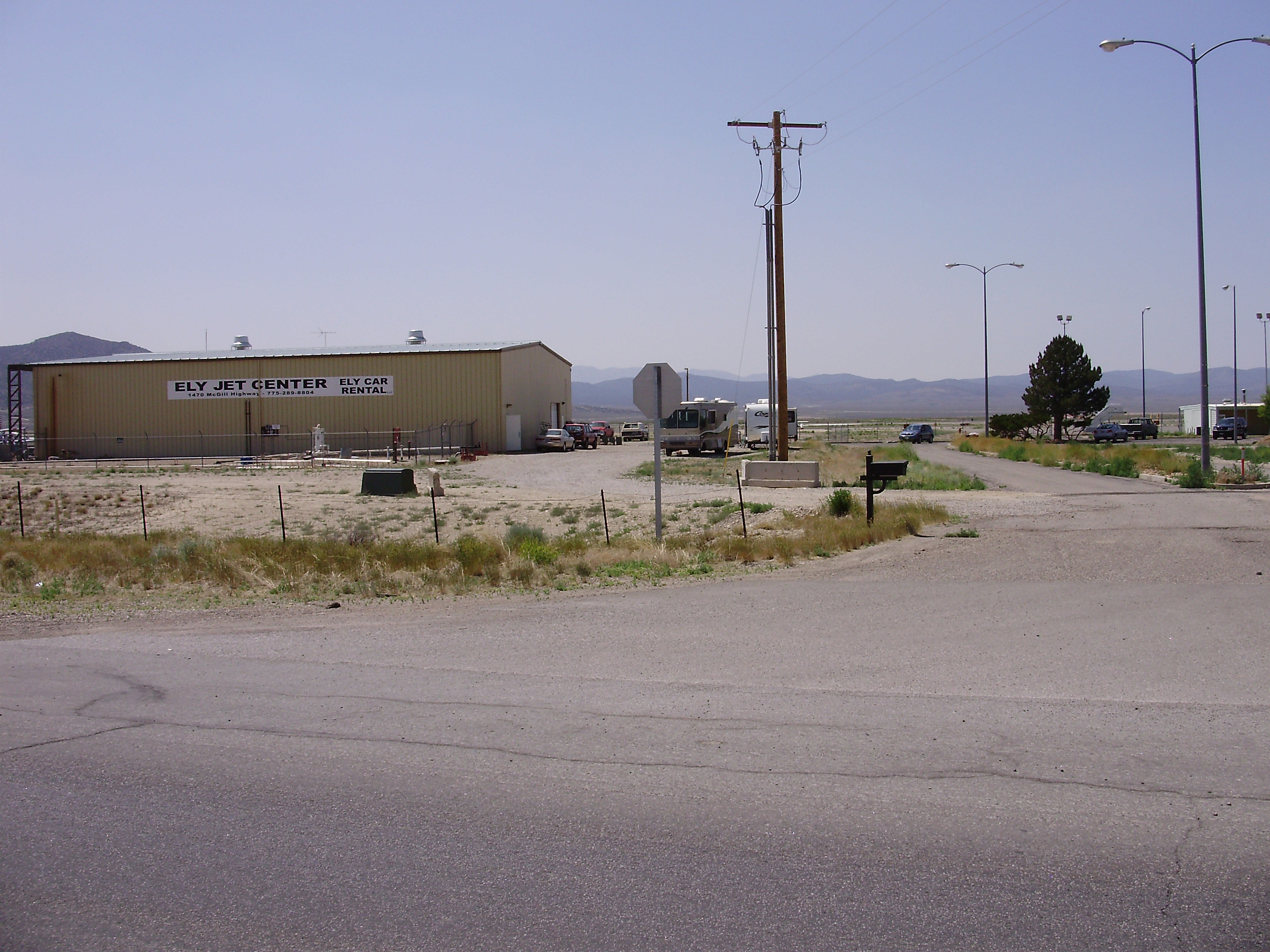
- Ely Jet Center
- IATA: ELY; ICAO: KELY; FAA LID: ELY

Summary
- Airport type: Public
- Owner: White Pine County
- Serves: Ely, Nevada
- Elevation AMSL: 6,260 ft (1,910 m)
- Coordinates: 39°17′59″N 114°50′31″W

Map
- Location within Nevada Location within the United States

Runways
| Direction | Length | | Surface |
| Direction | ft | m | Surface |
|---|---|---|---|
| 18/36 | 6,017 | 1,834 | Asphalt |
| 12/30 | 4,825 | 1,471 | Asphalt |

Statistics (2022)
- Aircraft operations (year ending 4/30/2022): 5,583
- Based aircraft: 10
- Source: Federal Aviation Administration

Ely Airport (IATA: ELY, ICAO: KELY, FAA LID: ELY) (Yelland Field) is a county-owned airport three miles northeast of Ely, in White Pine County, Nevada, United States.

The Federal Aviation Administration says this airport had 239 passenger boardings (enplanements) in calendar year 2008, 216 in 2009 and 245 in 2010. The National Plan of Integrated Airport Systems for 2011–2015 categorized it as a general aviation airport.

== History ==
=== Historical airline service ===
Ely's first airline service began with United Airlines in 1955 providing one daily direct flight each to Salt Lake City and San Francisco using Convair 340 aircraft. The flight to San Francisco made stops in Elko and Reno, Nevada, as well as Sacramento and Oakland, California. Service was later upgraded using Douglas DC-6Bs that continued into 1970. This was United's last service using piston engine propeller DC-6 aircraft. United then began a subcontract arrangement with Frontier Airlines (1950-1986) using Convair 580s for its Ely service. In 1977, United brought the service back in house using Boeing 737-200 jets flying a San Francisco - Reno - Elko - Ely - Salt Lake City - Denver route with one daily round trip. Ely was the smallest destination ever to be served year round by United mainline jets. United's service ended on April 1, 1982.

Scenic Airlines also served Ely from about 1973 through 1976 with flights to Las Vegas using Cessna 402 aircraft. Chaparral Aviation flew from Ely to several smaller communities throughout northern Nevada in 1981 and 1982.

With the Airline Deregulation Act of 1978, service to Ely became subsidized under the Essential Air Service program so that the city would not lose all service. A series of commuter airlines then provided service to Ely.

SkyWest Airlines provided service to Salt Lake City (SLC) as well as Elko and Reno, Nevada, offering three daily flights each using Piper Navajo aircraft. In 1986, SkyWest began operating as Western Express, a code-share affiliate for Western Airlines which had built a major hub at SLC. Service was reduced to only one daily roundtrip to SLC using a larger Fairchild Swearingen Metroliner aircraft. Western Airlines merged with Delta Air Lines in 1987, and the SkyWest flight then took on the designation as Delta Connection. Service continued until 1996.

Alpine Aviation provided two daily flights to SLC from 1996 through 1999 using Piper Cheyenne aircraft.

Scenic Airlines returned to Ely from 1999 through 2006 with flights to North Las Vegas Airport and Elko Regional Airport.

On November 12, 2006, Air Midwest began flights to McCarran International Airport in Las Vegas via Cedar City Regional Airport in Cedar City, Utah, using Beechcraft 1900Ds. The stop in Cedar City was due to the fact that McCarran Airport requires Transportation Security Administration screening not available at Ely. The return flights operated nonstop from Las Vegas to Ely. The service began as America West Express, a feeder service for America West Airlines. America West merged with US Airways in 2007 at which time the service became US Airways Express. This service ended in mid-2008.

Great Lakes Aviation then took over serving Ely with Beechcraft 1900Ds as well. At first, a single flight to Denver was operated with a stop at Moab, Utah. In 2011, the service was switched to one daily nonstop flight to Las Vegas. Great Lakes service ended in March, 2013, as passenger traffic fell below the minimum required to maintain subsidies. Ely has not seen scheduled airline service since.

== Facilities ==
Ely Airport covers 4,999 acres (2,023 ha) at an elevation of 6,260 feet (1,908 m). It has two asphalt runways: 18/36 is 6,017 by 150 feet (1,834 x 46 m) and 12/30 is 4,825 by 60 feet (1,471 x 18 m).

In the year ending April 30, 2022, the airport had 5,583 aircraft operations, average 107 per week: 73% general aviation, 23% air taxi, and 4% military. 10 aircraft were then based here: 9 single-engine, and 1 multi-engine.

== See also ==
- List of airports in Nevada
