= Absurda =

- Directed by: David Lynch
- Written by: David Lynch
- Produced by: David Lynch
- Cinematography: David Lynch
- Edited by: David Lynch
- Music by: David Lynch
- Production company: Absurda
- Release date: May 2007 (Cannes)
- Running time: 3 minutes
- Country: United States
- Language: English

Absurda (also titled Scissors) is a 2007 American short surrealist experimental horror film written, directed, shot, edited, produced, and scored by David Lynch. (Note: Lynch opted to mention only his role as writer and director in the closing credits.) It consists of a single stationary shot of a cinema screen which shows nightmarish images as people in the cinema, voiced by uncredited and unknown actors, are heard discussing what they are seeing.

Absurda was shown at the Cannes Film Festival as an opening short to Wong Kar-wai's romantic drama film My Blueberry Nights, and was part of the anthology film To Each His Own Cinema, which was commissioned to celebrate the 60th anniversary of Cannes.

== Plot ==
Four people who are heard but never seen enter a cinema, expecting to see a film about dancing, but see only a large pair of scissors sticking out of the screen. They are then shown images of a woman in a pink dress and ballet shoes, who they identify as one of their group named Cindy, and a man with a bloody face, who they identify as another member of their group named Tom.

The projectionist explains that the scissors are "what was used" and that Tom is "the one who did it". Tom denies that he is the one on screen. The scissors reappear in a stabbing motion as Cindy becomes distressed by how Tom is looking at her. A commotion ensues and Cindy's screams accompany the cinema being engulfed in smoke as the others shout at Tom to "stop".

Cindy reappears on the screen, performing ballet as she is heard saying, "So I went dancing... I've always loved to dance."
