= At the Suicide of the Last Jew in the World in the Last Cinema in the World =

Short film by David Cronenberg

At the Suicide of the Last Jew in the World in the Last Cinema in the World is a short film by David Cronenberg and part of the To Each His Own Cinema anthology film.

== Plot ==
In the film Cronenberg explores for the first time on film his Jewish identity. The short film is part of a compilation of other short films from 35 auteurs that the Cannes Film Festival commissioned for its 60th anniversary. Cronenberg plays the title character, an old man holding a gun to his head, which Maclean's Brian D. Johnson described as "Cronenberg shoots himself shooting himself." He prepares to commit suicide on television while commentators discuss Jews and cinema.

== Production ==
Cronenberg said, "I've never thought of myself as a Philip Roth whose subject was his Jewishness, but I've never denied it." He decided to finally deal with issues involving his Jewish identity because of Hezbollah's mission statement. He said, "It's pretty interesting to hear someone say our goal is to kill every Jew in the world wherever they are. That means me and my children. It does evoke a reaction."

== Reception ==
Stuart Klawans said that "It is, on its face, the very opposite of a Purim story, not only because the last Jew will die but because no determined enemy does him in." Scott Foundas said that Cronenberg's piece "goes so far as to presage not just the end of movies as we know them but of the people frequently credited with popularizing them."

Petter Brunette in Cannes said that it was "weirdly droll yet chilling." Todd McCarthy said that Cronenberg's short film was "Occupying a provocative, confrontational zone all its own" amongst the others in the compilation.

Cronenberg aired many opinions about the future of cinema in interviews and press conferences following his short's viewing. He said at a press session with several other directors that, "The form of cinema as we know it already is a thing of the past."
