= Hotel Nevada and Gambling Hall =

Casino hotel in Nevada, United States

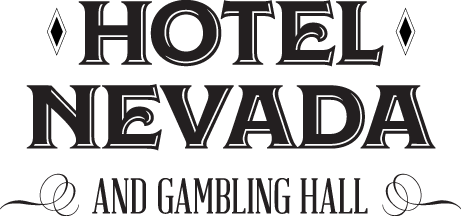

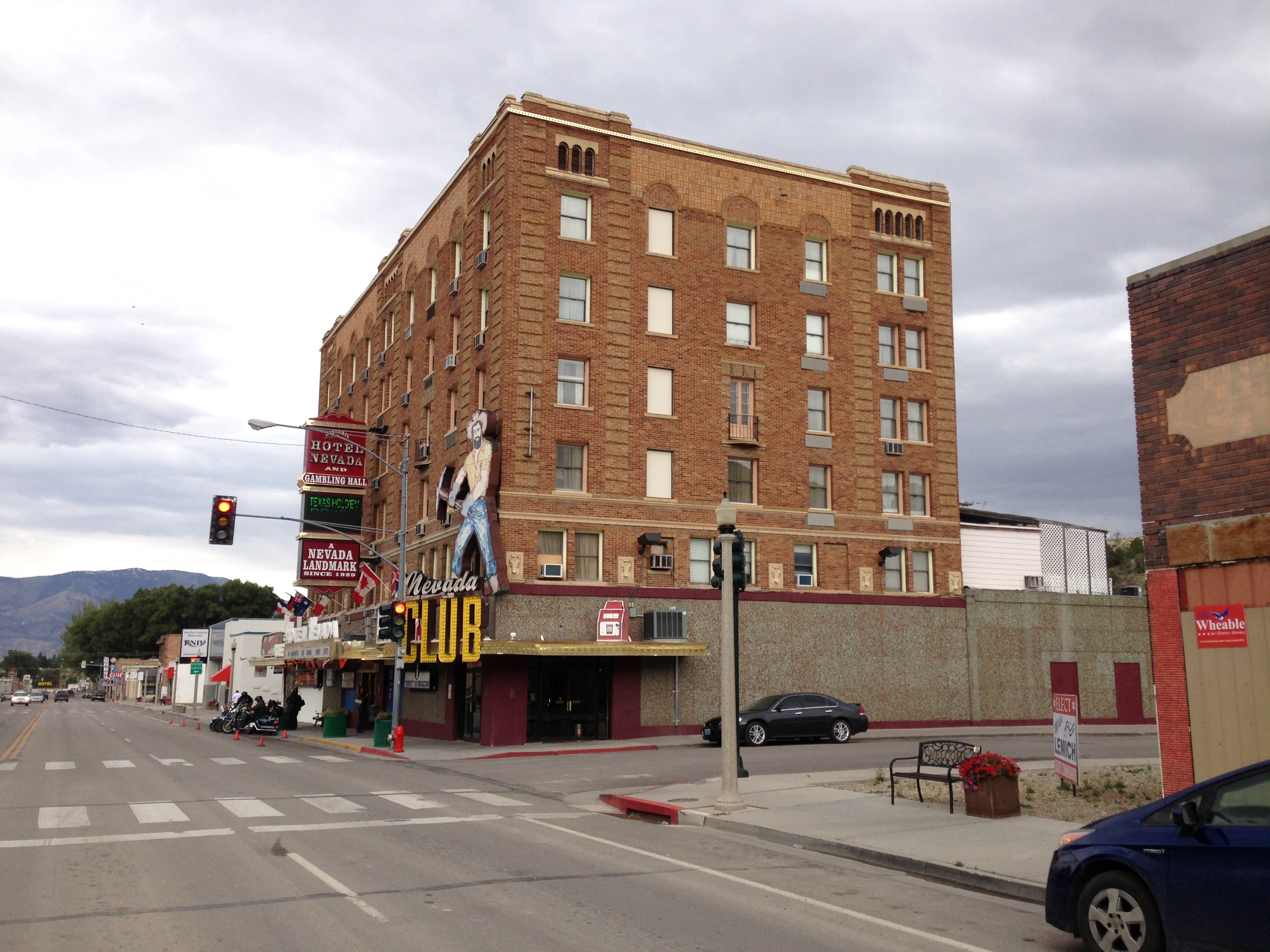
- Hotel Nevada, seen from Aultman Street in 2014.
- Interactive map of Hotel Nevada and Gambling Hall
- Location: Ely, Nevada, U.S.; 501 Aultman Street; 39.248055°N 114.892815°W
- Opened: July 7, 1929; 97 years ago
- No. of rooms: 67
- Gaming space: 2,929 sq ft (272.1 m^{2})
- Casino type: Land-based
- Owner: Paul Kellogg; Gaughan Gaming
- Architect: H.L. Stevens & Company
- Renovated in: 1931; 1981–1982; 1986–1987; 1994–1998; 2014–2015; 2017: Denny's
- Website: hotelnevada.com

Hotel Nevada and Gambling Hall, also known as the Historic Hotel Nevada and Gambling Hall, is a hotel and casino located at 501 Aultman Street in Ely, Nevada.

The Hotel Nevada was built at a cost of $400,000, and was opened on July 7, 1929, with 100 hotel rooms. At six stories high, it was the tallest building in the state until 1931. Many celebrities and politicians have stayed at the hotel since it opened. The hotel-casino has changed ownership numerous times during its history, and was closed temporarily in 1986, because of a local economic downturn. The Hotel Nevada was sold to Bert Woywood and Paul Kellogg in February 1994. After 20 years, Woywood sold his ownership stake to Gaughan Gaming in February 2014.

== History ==
=== Early history and construction ===
In 1926, Earl Ray "E. R." Miller (c. 1884–1978), an East Ely businessman who was searching for markets for his cement product, chose to promote the construction of a large hotel in Ely. With financial backing from various local groups and citizens, the Hotel Nevada Realty Company, Incorporated, was formed. Joseph "Candy Joe" Fouilleul, an officer of Hotel Nevada Realty Company, operated Joe's Candy Kitchen on the property desired for the new hotel, at the corner of Aultman Street and Fifth Street. Fouilleul was ultimately persuaded to move his business in exchange for a high position on the board of the new company.

The H.L. Stevens & Company of San Francisco was hired to design the hotel. Plans for the six-story hotel included at least 60 rooms, a restaurant, a banquet room, a club room, a barber shop, and large storage areas. A picture of the proposed hotel appeared on the front cover of Hotel World magazine in September 1927. On November 3, 1927, it was announced that organization of the new Hotel Nevada Corporation was complete after six months. Removal of buildings on the property, as well as excavation work, was expected to begin in January 1928. Clearing of the existing buildings on the property began in May 1928, with demolition expected to be completed around the end of the month and excavation expected to begin immediately afterward.

Excavation work was later expected to begin in mid-June 1928, at which point the demolition of the recently vacated Collins hardware store was to be completed. The site of the future hotel was 100 feet by 100 feet. The hotel's basement was expected to be 10 feet deep. Construction was to be handled by The Wheelwright Construction Company, with a contract price of $2,875,000. Excavation for the basement was completed in early July 1928. During construction, approximately four feet of cement was poured between each floor of the hotel. After the completion of the brick building's exterior on February 5, 1929, construction crews shifted their focus to the hotel's interior.

=== Opening and operation (1929–1986) ===
The $400,000 Hotel Nevada opened on July 7, 1929, with 100 rooms. An official grand opening ceremony was held on the night of July 15, 1929, with 167 guests in attendance from Nevada, California and Utah. U.S. Senator Tasker Oddie and U.S. Representative Sam Arentz were the guest speakers at the event; they and others, including Ely mayor Alfred Tamblyn, gave speeches about the hotel's various construction phases. The six-story hotel was the tallest building in the state until 1931, when the seven-story El Cortez Hotel in Reno, Nevada was completed. The Hotel Nevada was also the state's first fire-proof building.

The Hotel Nevada covertly offered Bathtub gin and moonshine to its customers, as Prohibition in the United States was still in effect. The Hotel Nevada also secretly provided its guests with gambling, which was made illegal in Nevada in 1910. After the Great Depression began in October 1929, the hotel was forced to lease commercial space to a drug store and a bank to maintain profits and stay open. When gambling was once again legalized in Nevada in 1931, the owners immediately renovated the casino, and added slot machines and blackjack tables, with an opening planned for March 30, 1931.

In February 1932, ownership was taken over by Wingfield banks when they bid $100,000 for the property, after its stockholders were unable to refinance loans amounting to $175,000. That month, the stockholders were planning to reacquire the property. In April 1932, the Hotel Nevada was purchased by a group that was headed by Winfield Scott "Ole" Elliott (1869–1938), of Goldfield, Nevada. The building was owned by the Henderson Bank Mortgage Company of Elko (50 percent), the Tonopah Banking Corporation (15 percent), the Carson Valley Bank (12 2/3 percent), and the Bank of Nevada Savings & Trust Company (23 1/3 percent). Elliott acted as the hotel's manager on behalf of the banks. Elliott subsequently partnered with Bert Riddick when they purchased the hotel from the banks for $80,000 in April 1936, with Elliott remaining as the hotel's manager. Elliott also owned Ely's Northern Hotel, which had been the city's leading hotel until the opening of Hotel Nevada. In October 1938, Elliott died of a cerebral hemorrhage in his home at the Hotel Nevada, after suffering several strokes. A beauty shop operated inside the hotel in 1939.

Elliott's wife, Mae, operated the hotel as co-owner with Riddick until her death in May 1941. Mae Elliot's interest in the hotel was inherited by her two sisters, and later disposed to Riddick when he purchased the Elliotts' interest in the hotel in February 1943, giving him sole ownership. In August 1955, Francis Everett "Bud" Simpson (1904–1968), a well-known local businessman, purchased Hotel Nevada for more than $500,000. At that time, Hotel Nevada had 90 rooms and was considered one of the best-known hotels in the state. Simpson planned to remodel the hotel's ground floor and convert it into a casino.

The Blue Cab taxi company opened in Ely in July 1961, with its headquarters inside the Hotel Nevada. In May 1962, three men – Milan Milovich, Norm Goeringer, and Lee Warren – applied for approval to take over the hotel's operations and ownership as part of a $400,000 deal. That year, Simpson sold the hotel to Goeringer, Warren, and Dick Piper. In January 1964, Goeringer and Piper filed a $1 million damage suit against Warren, who was no longer an owner of the hotel. Goeringer and Piper alleged that Warren had made false statements about the hotel. The partners later split, with Goeringer as the hotel's sole owner. On December 31, 1969, an Alaska man shot and wounded a police officer inside the hotel's restaurant. In October 1971, Goeringer sold the hotel to Gary Everhart – a credit manager for the Aladdin resort in Las Vegas, Nevada – and his wife, Connie. The Everharts later divorced and lost the hotel back to Goeringer in 1974. In 1978, Kennecott Minerals Company closed its copper mine in nearby Ruth, Nevada, which caused a severe economic depression for Ely that endured for years.

Justice Court Judge Eugene Rasmussen, of South Lake Tahoe, California, had been in eastern Nevada with a friend when they discovered that the Hotel Nevada was for sale. Rasmussen, who lacked the finances to purchase the hotel, discussed it with Terry Goggin, a Democratic state assemblyman from San Bernardino, California. Goggin subsequently recruited Dennis Krieger, an old friend and stockbroker from Beverly Hills, California. Together, the men would form the White Pine Company, with Krieger holding a 55 percent interest and acting as president, treasure and director. A 30 percent interest in the company would be held by the White Pine Trust, a fund that would be established by Goggin with his wife Jill and three children as the beneficiaries. Rasmussen, who would hold a 2.5 percent interest, would act as the secretary and director of the Hotel Nevada, as well as the trustee of Goggin's trust.

On December 10, 1980, plans by the men to purchase the hotel from Goeringer for more than $380,000 were delayed by the Nevada Gaming Control Board, which had concerns about Goggin's trust fund. Because of the trust, Goggin would seemingly not benefit directly from the hotel. However, Control Board members requested that Goggin still participate in a suitability hearing. One Board member said that Goggin's trust seemed like an attempt to "cover something up." Goggin denied that he was using the trust fund to obscure his investment in the Hotel Nevada, which was expected to range between $80,000 and $130,000 depending on bank financing. The $2.4 million takeover deal was later recommended for approval by the Control Board, and was unanimously approved by the Nevada Gaming Commission on December 18, 1980. The group received a one-year gaming license, to allow the Control Board to review the group's financial operations during that time. The group hired Robert Sanderson, a Certified Public Accountant, and his wife Janet, a former blackjack dealer and native of Fallon, Nevada, to manage the Hotel Nevada. The Sandersons became co-owners a month later in January 1981.

In 1981, Norm Goeringer and his wife, Mary, sold a deed of trust on the hotel to the White Pine Company. In June 1981, Krieger, Goggin, and businessman David T. Smith signed a short-term note for $690,000, which included Krieger signing a trust deed on the Hotel Nevada. Money from the loan was used for a renovation of the hotel, beginning in September 1981. In December 1981, the Control Board recommended that the group be approved for a permanent gaming license. Because of declining business, the Hotel Nevada lost $124,456 in 1981, and continued to perform poorly during the first half of 1982. On March 14, 1983, gambling at the Hotel Nevada was briefly shut down when officials from the Internal Revenue Service seized money from the casino, although hotel guests were still allowed to stay. White Pine Company had owed back taxes of $231,380, dating to 1981. At the time of the closure, the Hotel Nevada was Ely's only hotel-casino, as well as the city's largest structure. The casino reopened the next day.

In an attempt to solve its financial problems, White Pine Company filed for Chapter 11 reorganization in a Reno bankruptcy court in 1983. In summer 1986, Goeringer filed for foreclosure on the deed after White Pine Company defaulted on its payments.

=== Closure (1986–1987) ===
Because of ongoing financial difficulties, Hotel Nevada closed at approximately 2:00 p.m. on September 1, 1986, resulting in the layoffs of approximately 65 people. The closure was not authorized by bankruptcy court officials, resulting in the building's status changing to a Chapter 7 liquidation under federal bankruptcy laws. Approximately 65 slot machines and other items were removed from the property and sold in Las Vegas. A sale of the building was scheduled for September 23, 1986, but was postponed until October 3, after no potential buyers appeared for the sale. If the property failed to sell, ownership was expected to be reverted to the Goeringers, although Norm Goeringer said the building was no longer operational after the liquidation; Goeringer believed that the Hotel Nevada – considered to be an important part of Ely's public image and economy – could have reopened sooner had the sale not occurred.

The sale was delayed again to October 15, 1986, after another lack of potential buyers. The Goeringers were declared the owners on November 17, 1986, after no prospective buyers appeared at the sale. The minimum bid had been set at just over $1.1 million, including $147,100 in equipment and furniture. Norm Goeringer planned a tentative New Year's Eve re-opening date, and had workmen refurbishing the building's interior to bring it up to state, fire, and safety standards, at a cost of at least $300,000. By February 1987, the building's interior had been gutted for the installation of a fire sprinkler system and fire alarms. New furniture was also planned for inclusion to help modernize the building. Hotel Nevada, at that time, was expected to reopen later that spring, with potentially 60 employees.

=== Reopening and later years (1987–present) ===
In March 1987, Norm Goeringer planned to have the hotel's main floor reopened in early April, while the hotel portion was planned for reopening in early May. The hotel's renovated bar reopened in early April, while the restaurant reopened on April 12. The hotel portion was scheduled for reopening on May 1, 1987, with 60 rooms. A total of 55 jobs were created when the Hotel Nevada reopened. In November 1987, Goeringer and the hotel were among 29 businesses and business owners honored at the Nevada Governor's Conference on Tourism for their promotion of tourism. The Goeringers operated the hotel until their divorce in 1989. Mary Goeringer received the hotel as part of the divorce settlement, and sold it in February 1994, to Bert Woywood and Paul Kellogg, who both lived in Las Vegas, Nevada. Woywood had been a frequent visitor to Ely since the 1970s, and would always stay at the Hotel Nevada.

Woywood spent the next four years renovating the building, to restore its historical aspect. By September 1998, 40 of the hotel's 65 rooms had been renovated. The deluxe rooms were themed and dedicated to a celebrity guest who had stayed in each room. Woywood had doubled the casino from 80 slot machines to 150, and also doubled the hotel's parking and was in the process of creating a rear entrance for the building. Woywood had built up the hotel's occupancy rate to nearly 100 percent during the summer season, compared to approximately 30 percent four years earlier. Occupancy rates for the winter season were also raised significantly, to 50 percent. The hotel had planned a fireworks show for December 31, 1999, as part of a New Year's Eve celebration; those plans were cancelled because of safety concerns. For the New Year's Eve celebration, $1,500 in cash was thrown from the hotel's roof. By 2001, a new $100,000 elevator had been installed. As of 2002, the hotel remained the tallest building in Ely.

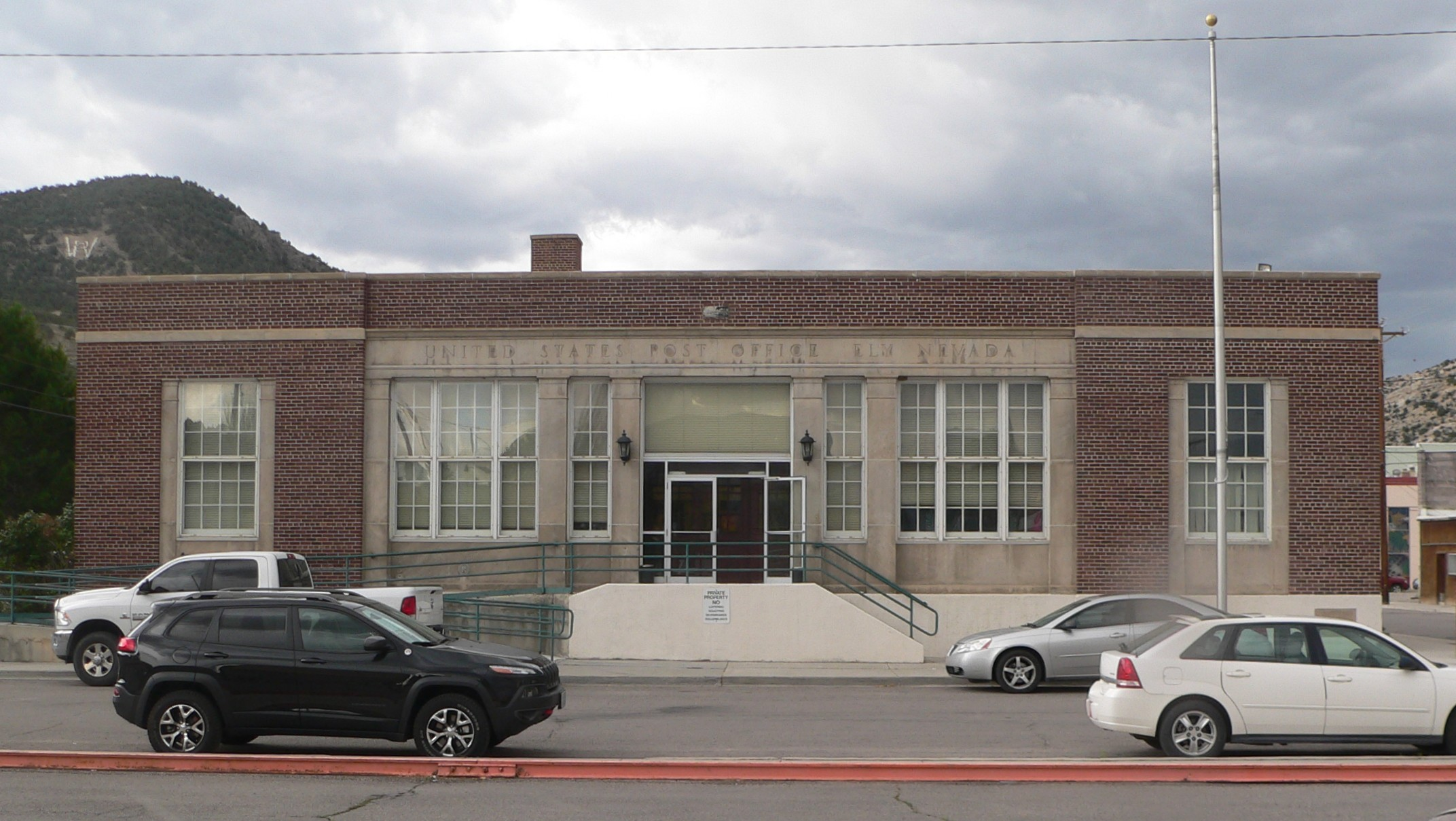
Hotel Nevada's Postal Palace in 2014.

Ely's former post office, a block west of Hotel Nevada, was purchased by the hotel-casino and reopened as its Postal Palace convention center on December 15, 2005.

In February 2014, Gaughan Gaming and its CEO, John Gaughan, purchased Woywood's 50 percent stake of the hotel, which had 67 rooms at that point. Gaughan's young daughter was friends with Kellogg's daughter; through that relationship, Gaughan learned that Woywood wanted to sell his ownership of the hotel. Upon entering the Hotel Nevada, John Gaughan was reminded of the El Cortez hotel and casino – owned by his grandfather, Jackie Gaughan – in downtown Las Vegas. After Gaughan's acquisition, the building's carpets were replaced and the casino's 185 slot machines were upgraded with new technology.

John Gaughan, the son of South Point casino owner Michael Gaughan, was provided unused casino equipment and furniture from the South Point for use in the Hotel Nevada. A sportsbook opened at the casino on October 23, 2014, replacing the casino's William Hill betting machine. It was the first live betting sportsbook to be introduced in Ely. Within three weeks, the sportsbook was deemed a success. The Hotel Nevada is the only casino in Ely to provide table game gambling, with three blackjack tables and a poker table. After Gaughan's purchase, the table games were eventually moved from the basement and onto the casino's ground floor. In February 2015, the restaurant was being renovated.

As of 2015, the casino is 2,929 sq ft (272.1 m^{2}), including the 50 sq ft (4.6 m^{2}) sportsbook. Sealed tunnels beneath the hotel are rumored by local residents to be haunted. Hotel Nevada's restaurant closed in March 2017, to allow for renovations that converted the space into a Denny's restaurant, which opened in late April 2017.

== Film history ==
In January 1950, scenes for the film Operation Haylift were shot at the Hotel Nevada, which also served as headquarters for the cast and crew. Scenes for the 2008 film, My Blueberry Nights, were shot at Hotel Nevada. The hotel's interior and exterior are also featured in the 2009 film, Play Dead.

== Celebrity guests, memorabilia and murals ==
The hotel's entrance features a walk of fame sidewalk for the celebrities who have stayed there. Notable Hotel Nevada guests include Ingrid Bergman, Gary Cooper, Veronica Cooper, U.S. President Lyndon B. Johnson, Ray Milland, Hoot Gibson, Mickey Rooney, Tennessee Ernie Ford, Senator Harry Reid, Charlie Rich, Stephen King, Evel Knievel, and Pretty Boy Floyd. Celebrities such as Hank Thompson, Vikki Carr, Wanda Jackson, and The Ink Spots have entertained at the hotel, as well as Wayne Newton. Pat Nixon, who was born in Ely, made her only known visit to the city on September 16, 1952, appearing at a campaign rally outside the hotel with her husband, vice-presidential candidate Richard Nixon. A star with Pat Nixon's name is included on the hotel's walk of fame.

Photos of the hotel's famous visitors were displayed on walls throughout the building, while the casino's walls featured 200 photographs of the White Pine County area and a collection of old guns. Other various memorabilia and antiques were featured throughout the building, including taxidermy animals. In August 1965, a slab of the Prometheus tree was put on display in the hotel's lobby; by 1998, it had been moved to the city's convention center. Other memorabilia included wagon wheel chandeliers, motorcycles, Roy Rogers memorabilia, miniature mechanized dioramas, and a life-sized hand-carved statue of actor John Wayne. Woywood, who gathered all the memorabilia and unique furnishings, said the building was "like a museum with no theme." Much of the memorabilia was removed after Gaughan's purchase of the hotel.

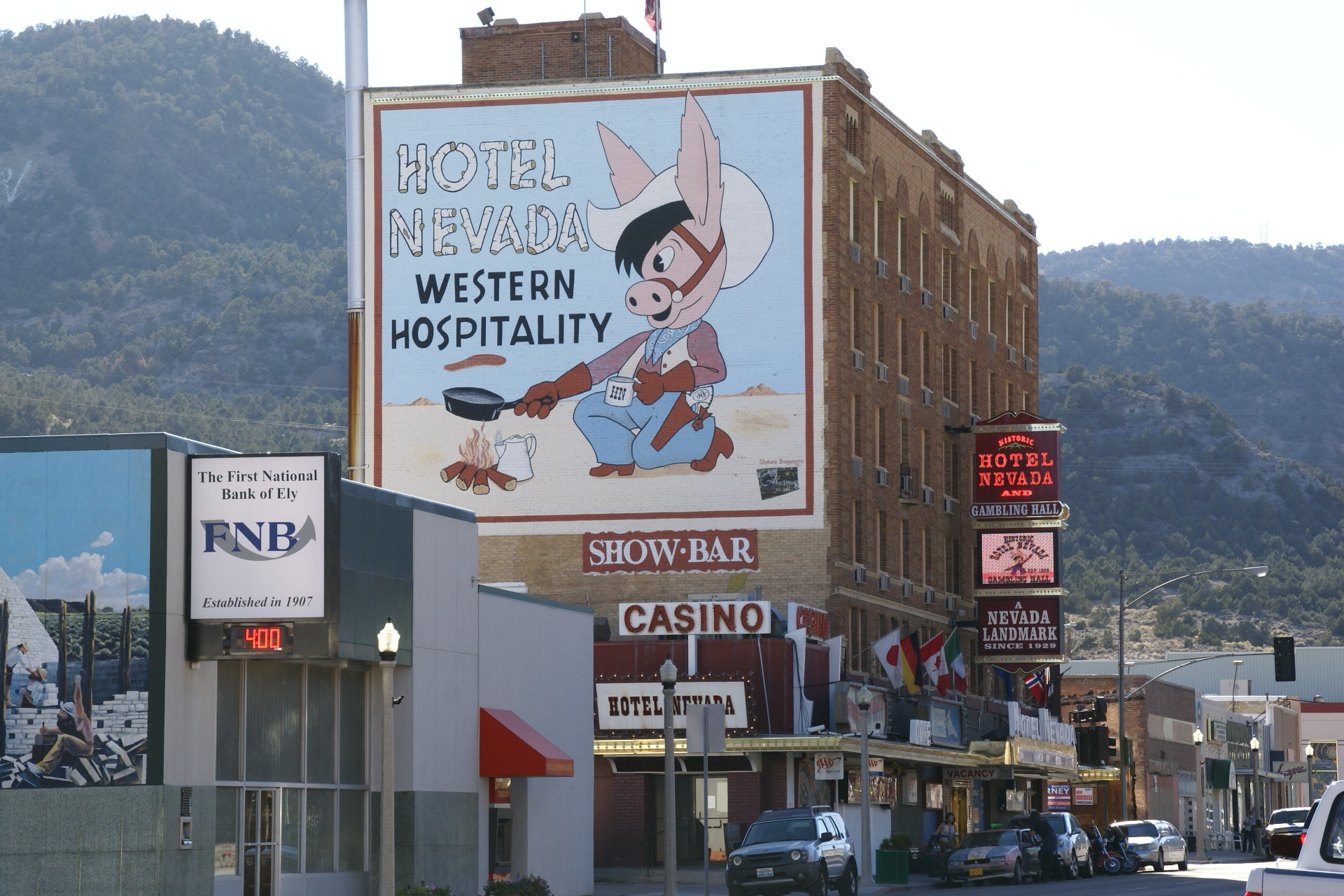
The hotel's donkey mural in 2012.

In the 1930s, a large mural of a donkey dressed as a cowboy was painted on the hotel's east exterior wall. It was the largest mural in the entire state at the time. By 1997, the donkey mural had been restored by Stephanie Bruegeman, an art teacher who also worked at Hotel Nevada as a secretary. In 1999, local artist Larry Bute painted 7-by-12-foot murals on the building's exterior, depicting 19th century cowboys in a saloon. Bute also spent a week painting murals in each hotel hallway on each floor. The casino floor also received a mural.
