= United States Post Office (Ely, Nevada) =

- U.S. Post Office, Ely, Nevada
- U.S. National Register of Historic Places
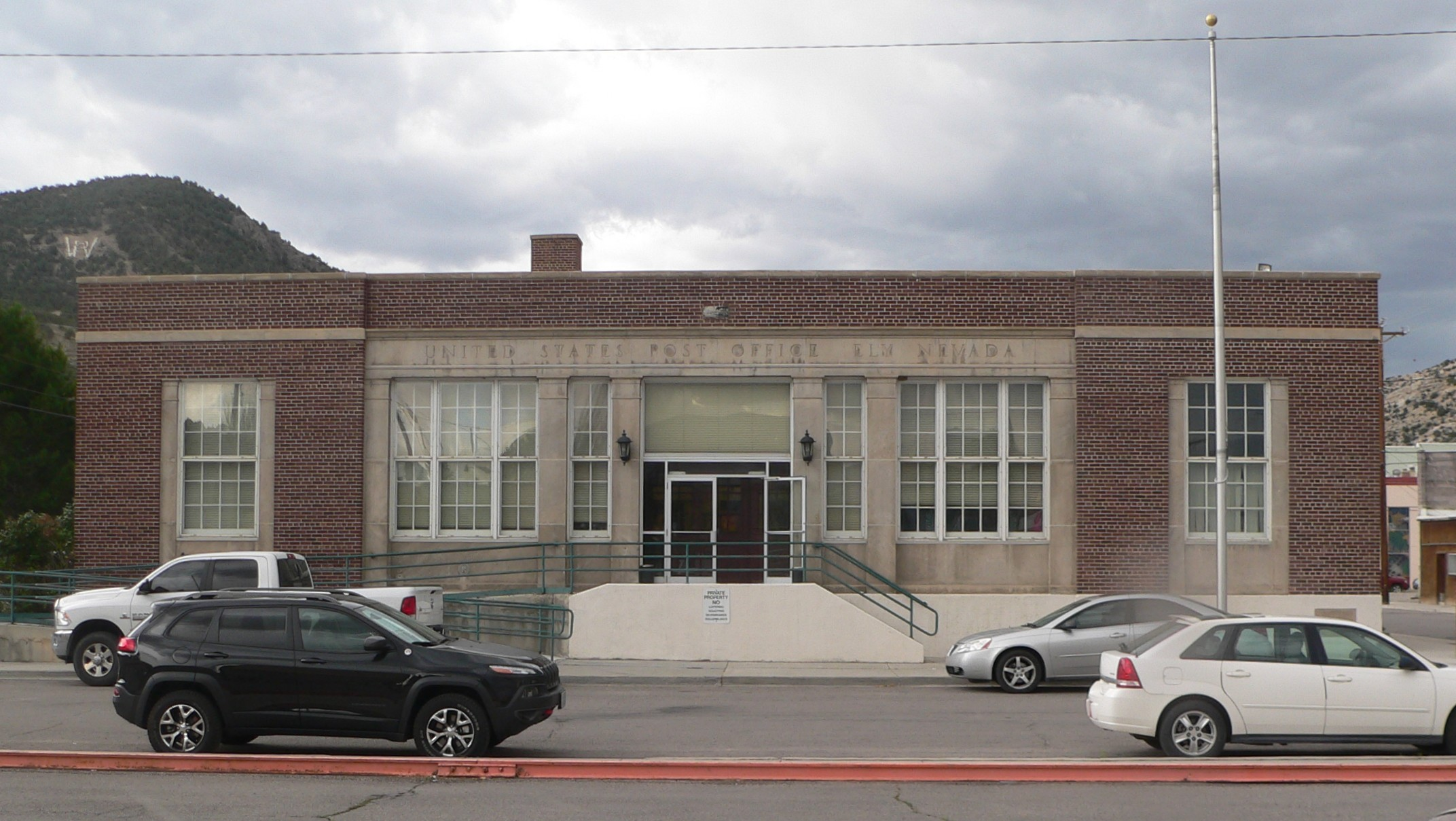
- Postal Palace Convention Center in 2014

- Location within Nevada Location within the United States
- Location: 415 Fifth St., Ely, Nevada
- Coordinates: 39°14′50.4″N 114°53′34.7″W
- Built: 1937
- Architect: Simon, Louis A.; et al.
- Architectural style: Classical Revival
- MPS: US Post Offices in Nevada MPS
- NRHP reference No.: 05001122
- Added to NRHP: October 7, 2005

The U.S. Post Office in Ely, Nevada was built to a standardized plan developed by the Office of the Supervising Architect, led by Louis A. Simon. The building uses an attenuated Classical style that was popular with Federal buildings in the 1930s. The post office opened on January 29, 1938, following delays in the start of construction. It closed in 2002, and was reopened in 2005 as a convention center for the nearby Hotel Nevada and Gambling Hall. That year, it was also listed on the National Register of Historic Places.

== Description ==
The building footprint is about 3,800 square feet (350 m^{2}), with a symmetrical facade. The building is one story in front, with a two-story section at the loading dock to the rear. The primary building material is brick, with cast stone accents. The building's most distinctive feature was removed in 1977 as part of accessibility improvements, when the original classical pediment and entry doors were removed and replaced by an aluminum storefront. The interior consists of a public lobby furnished with plaster walls and tile wainscot and floor. A work area and offices occupy the remaining two thirds of the main level. A basement contains storage and utility spaces.

== History ==
The Ely Post Office was built as part of an appropriation for post offices in Ely, Elko, Las Vegas and Reno, passed in June 1932. Plans to construct the post office were delayed because of a price dispute between the federal government and the owner of the preferred building site. The issue was settled in court in July 1933, and construction was to begin that month. However, from July 1933 to April 1937, the Nevada and federal governments disputed which of the two would have ownership of the land, with the federal government refusing to construct the post office until it was given complete jurisdiction of the property. Construction began in June 1937, and the post office was completed in late January 1938. It opened with a dedication ceremony on January 29, 1938.

The post office closed in 2002, following the opening of a new postal facility in 1999. In October 2003, following efforts by U.S. Senator Harry Reid, it was announced that the postmaster general would make the building available to Ely for community use. In November 2003, the White Pine County commission approved a tentative plan to lease the building from the Postal Service for a nine-month term, on the condition that the county could receive federal funding to renovate the building. The county determined that the building would need an expansion to accommodate various county offices that were intended to be relocated there.

The post office was listed on the National Register of Historic Places on October 7, 2005 as US Post Office, Ely, Nevada. The post office remained vacant until it was purchased by the nearby Hotel Nevada and Gambling Hall, which reopened the building as its Postal Palace convention center on December 15, 2005.
