= KDSS =

- Ely, Nevada; United States
- Frequency: 92.7 MHz

Programming
- Format: Country

Ownership
- Owner: Coates Broadcasting, Inc.

History
- First air date: December 8, 1992
- Former call signs: KBXS

Technical information
- Licensing authority: FCC
- Facility ID: 63558
- Class: C1
- ERP: 32,000 watts
- HAAT: 293 meters (962 feet)
- Transmitter coordinates: 39°14′46″N 114°55′39″W

Links
- Public license information: Public file; LMS

KDSS (92.7 FM) is a radio station licensed to serve Ely, Nevada. The station is owned by Coates Broadcasting, Inc. It airs a country music format.

The station was assigned the KDSS call letters by the Federal Communications Commission on December 8, 1992.

== History ==
The station began operating on 92.7 MHz and was assigned the call letters KBXS in 1988. During this period, it operated as "Power X 93" and aired an Adult Contemporary format, notably featuring the nationally syndicated American Top 40 countdown show. The call sign was officially changed to KDSS on December 8, 1992.

== Programming ==
In addition to its usual music format, programming on KDSS includes Takin’ it Outside, a short program about "living and playing in the Southwestern Outdoors" hosted by Doug Nielsen.

== Ownership ==
On November 30, 2007, Patrick Dennis Coates died at the age of 67. A resident of Ely since 1996, Coates and his wife, Samantha J. Coates, jointly owned 100 percent of privately held Coates Broadcasting, Inc. Samantha Coates died on September 1, 2009, at the age of 72. Ownership of the station and Coates Broadcasting, Inc. has since passed to Karen Livingston, daughter of Patrick and Samantha Coates.
