= To Each His Own Cinema =

- DVD cover of To Each His Own Cinema
- Directed by: Various directors
- Written by: Various writers
- Produced by: Gilles Jacob
- Starring: Various actors
- Cinematography: Various cinematographers
- Edited by: Various editors
- Music by: Mark Bradshaw; Mychael Danna; Eleni Karaindrou; Howard Shore
- Production company: Elzévir Films
- Distributed by: Pyramide Distribution
- Release dates: 20 May 2007 (Cannes); 31 October 2007 (France)
- Running time: 119 minutes
- Country: France
- Language: Various languages

To Each His Own Cinema (French: Chacun son cinéma : une déclaration d'amour au grand écran) is a 2007 French comedy-drama anthology film commissioned for the 60th anniversary of the Cannes Film Festival. The film is a collection of 34 short films, each 3 minutes in length, by 36 acclaimed directors. Representing five continents and 25 countries, the filmmakers were invited to express "their state of mind of the moment as inspired by the motion picture theatre".

The film's subtitle reads "a declaration of love to the big screen". Many of the shorts share similar subjects, including homage to classic European art cinema, the death of the filmgoing experience, memories of childhood wonder, the transporting power of cinema, and activities performed during a movie screening, including talking, stealing, crying, and having sex.

== Distribution ==
=== Premiere ===
To Each His Own Cinema premiered at the 2007 Cannes Film Festival on 20 May and was televised on the same night in France on Canal+. David Lynch's contribution, Absurda, was not ready in time and was instead shown before Wong Kar-wai's My Blueberry Nights on the festival's opening night.

=== DVD release ===
Two DVD versions of the film are available, both Region 2: one released by StudioCanal on 25 May 2007, the other released by Pyramide Distribution on 31 October 2007. World Cinema by Joel and Ethan Coen is not included on the StudioCanal DVD nor listed on the Pyramide DVD. David Lynch's Absurda is also not present on the StudioCanal DVD.

== Short films ==
- Raymond Depardon – Cinéma d'été (Open-Air Cinema): In Alexandria, Egypt, a small crowd attends a makeshift movie theatre.
- Takeshi Kitano – One Fine Day: An older gentleman deals with an incompetent projectionist (Kitano).
- Theo Angelopoulos – Trois minutes (Three Minutes): A woman (Jeanne Moreau) encounters the late Marcello Mastroianni (using footage from Angelopoulos' 1986 film The Beekeeper) in a movie theater and professes her love for him.
- Andrei Konchalovsky – Dans le noir (In the Dark): An aged cinema owner (Ela Sanko) attempts to watch 8½, while sex-crazed youths make out behind her.
- Nanni Moretti – Diario di uno spettatore (Diary of a Moviegoer): Moretti himself recounts treasured movie memories.
- Hou Hsiao-hsien – The Electric Princess Picture House: A family in 1940s Taiwan goes to see a film in a suddenly abandoned or decrepit theatre.
- Jean-Pierre and Luc Dardenne – Dans l'obscurité (Darkness): A pickpocket in a screening of Au hasard Balthazar accidentally connects with an audience member (Émilie Dequenne).
- David Lynch – Absurda: A sinister projectionist shows a group of teens a nightmarish vision of a murder. As he rolls the film, the teens appear to be compelled to commit it.
- Joel and Ethan Coen – World Cinema: A cowboy resembling Llewellyn Moss (Josh Brolin) decides between art films at the Aero Theatre.
- Alejandro González Iñárritu – Anna: A blind woman (Luisa Williams) is profoundly moved listening to her boyfriend interpret the end of Contempt.
- Zhang Yimou – En regardant le film (Movie Night): A young boy is enchanted by the arrival of a travelling movie show in his village.
- Amos Gitai – Le Dibbouk de Haifa (The Dybbuk of Haifa): Movie houses in 1930s Poland and present-day Israel are attacked.
- Jane Campion – The Lady Bug: A theatre janitor (Clayton Jacobson) fights a playful, dancing human-sized insect (Erica Englert).
- Atom Egoyan – Artaud Double Bill: Two women exchange texts at separate screenings, one of Vivre Sa Vie, the other at Egoyan's The Adjuster.
- Aki Kaurismäki – La Fonderie (The Foundry): Factory workers on lunch break sit down to enjoy a Lumiére silent film of workers on lunch break.
- Olivier Assayas – Recrudescence (Upsurge): A thief with an ambiguous relationship to a young woman (Deniz Gamze Ergüven) steals her purse during a screening.
- Youssef Chahine – 47 ans après (47 Years Later): A young Chahine (Karim Kassem) and his lead actress (Yosra El Lozy) commiserate over the critical failure of their movie at Cannes.
- Tsai Ming-liang – It's a Dream: A man (Lee Kang-sheng) remembers bonding with his family and the small audience at a theatre in Kuala Lumpur.
- Lars von Trier – Occupations: Von Trier plays himself, berating and violently hammering a loudmouthed businessman (Jacques Frantz) to death during the premiere of Manderlay.
- Raoul Ruiz – Le Don (The Gift): A blind man (Michael Lonsdale) tells his niece about the time he screened Casablanca to a rural village.
- Claude Lelouch – Cinéma de boulevard (The Cinema Around the Corner): A memoir of how the movie Top Hat impacted the director's family throughout the years.
- Gus Van Sant – First Kiss: A young projectionist falls in love with a girl in a film.
- Roman Polanski – Cinéma érotique: A middle aged couple watching Emmanuelle are annoyed by an apparent masturbator.
- Michael Cimino – No Translation Needed: An obnoxious theatre owner and amateur filmmaker (Cimino) makes a music video for a Cuban band.
- David Cronenberg – At the Suicide of the Last Jew in the World in the Last Cinema in the World: In a dystopian future, the horrific act of the title character (Cronenberg) and its societal implications are the subject of bland media obsession.
- Wong Kar-wai – I Travelled 9000 km to Give It to You: A young man eating fruit (Fan Chih Wei) thinks of his lover.
- Abbas Kiarostami – Where Is My Romeo?: Various Iranian women, including Golshifteh Farahani, Hamideh Kheirabadi, and Pegah Ahangarani, watch Romeo and Juliet and cry. This short is similar to Kiarostami's 2008 film Shirin.
- Bille August – The Last Dating Show: A man (Frank Hvam) translating a Danish movie for his non-fluent date (Anne-Marie Curry) runs afoul of aggressive audience members.
- Elia Suleiman – Irtebak (Awkward): A Palestinian director (Suleiman) is uncomfortable at a film festival.
- Manoel de Oliveira – Rencontre unique (Sole Meeting): A silent film depicting a meeting between Nikita Khrushchev (Michel Piccoli) and Pope John XXIII (Duarte d'Almeida) is screened.
- Walter Salles – À 8 944 km de Cannes (5,557 Miles from Cannes): In front of a marquee for The 400 Blows, two Brazilian singers trade songs about visiting the Cannes Film Festival.
- Wim Wenders – War in Peace: The inhabitants of a Congo village watch and discuss Black Hawk Down.
- Chen Kaige – Zhanxiou Village: Small children rig up a projector to watch a Charlie Chaplin film, only to be scared off by a nosy adult.
- Ken Loach – Happy Ending: A father (Bradley Walsh) and son argue about the screenings at a multiplex, ultimately deciding to go watch football instead.
- The epilogue is taken from the film Le silence est d'or by René Clair.
