= Micca House =

Historic house in Nevada, United States

- U.S. National Register of Historic Places
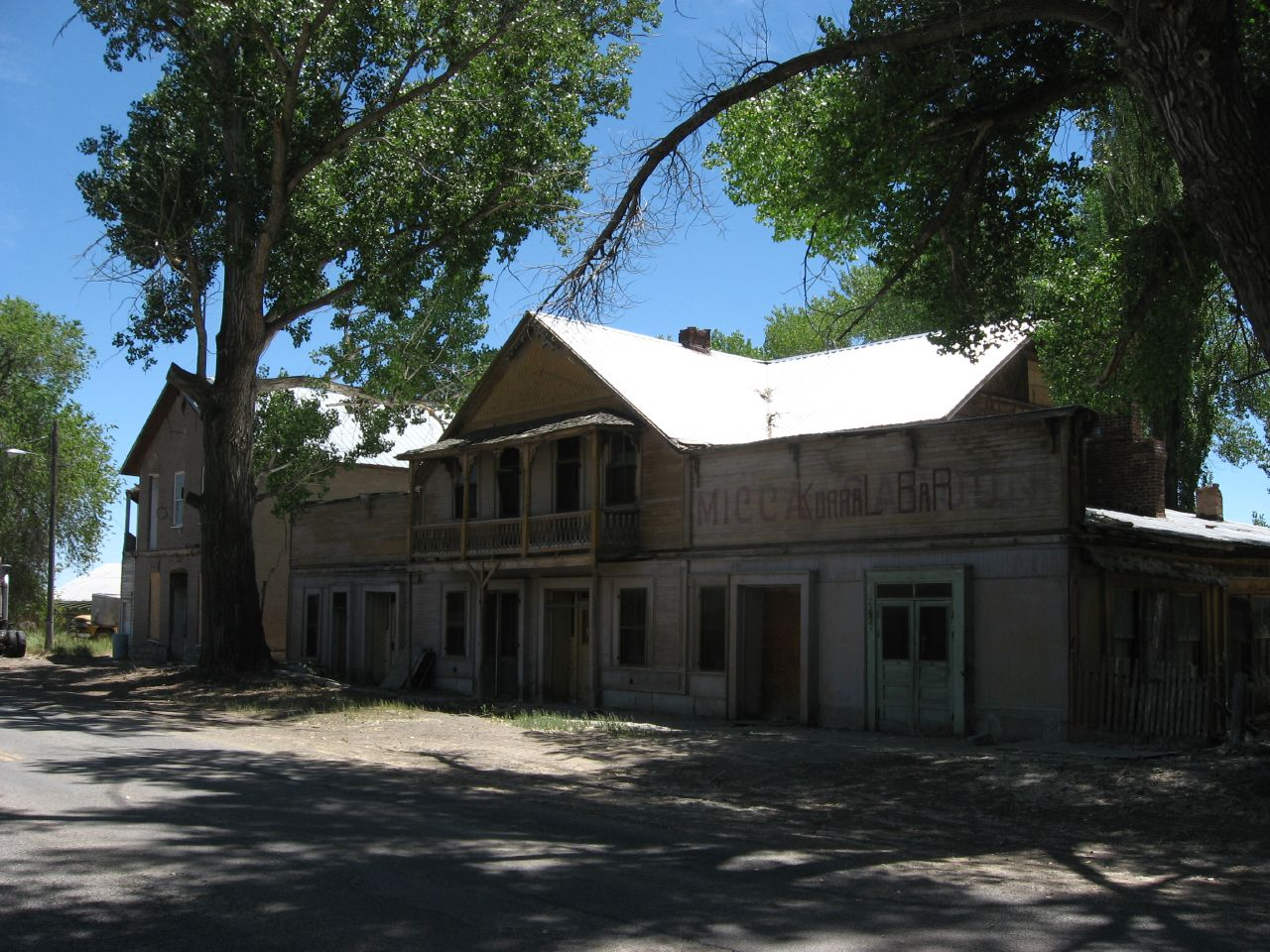
- Micca House in 2007

- Location within Nevada Location within the United States
- Location: Bridge St., Paradise Valley, Nevada
- Coordinates: 41°29′34″N 117°31′54″W
- Area: 2 acres (0.81 ha)
- Built: 1885
- Architectural style: Stick/Eastlake
- NRHP reference No.: 75001112
- Added to NRHP: June 11, 1975

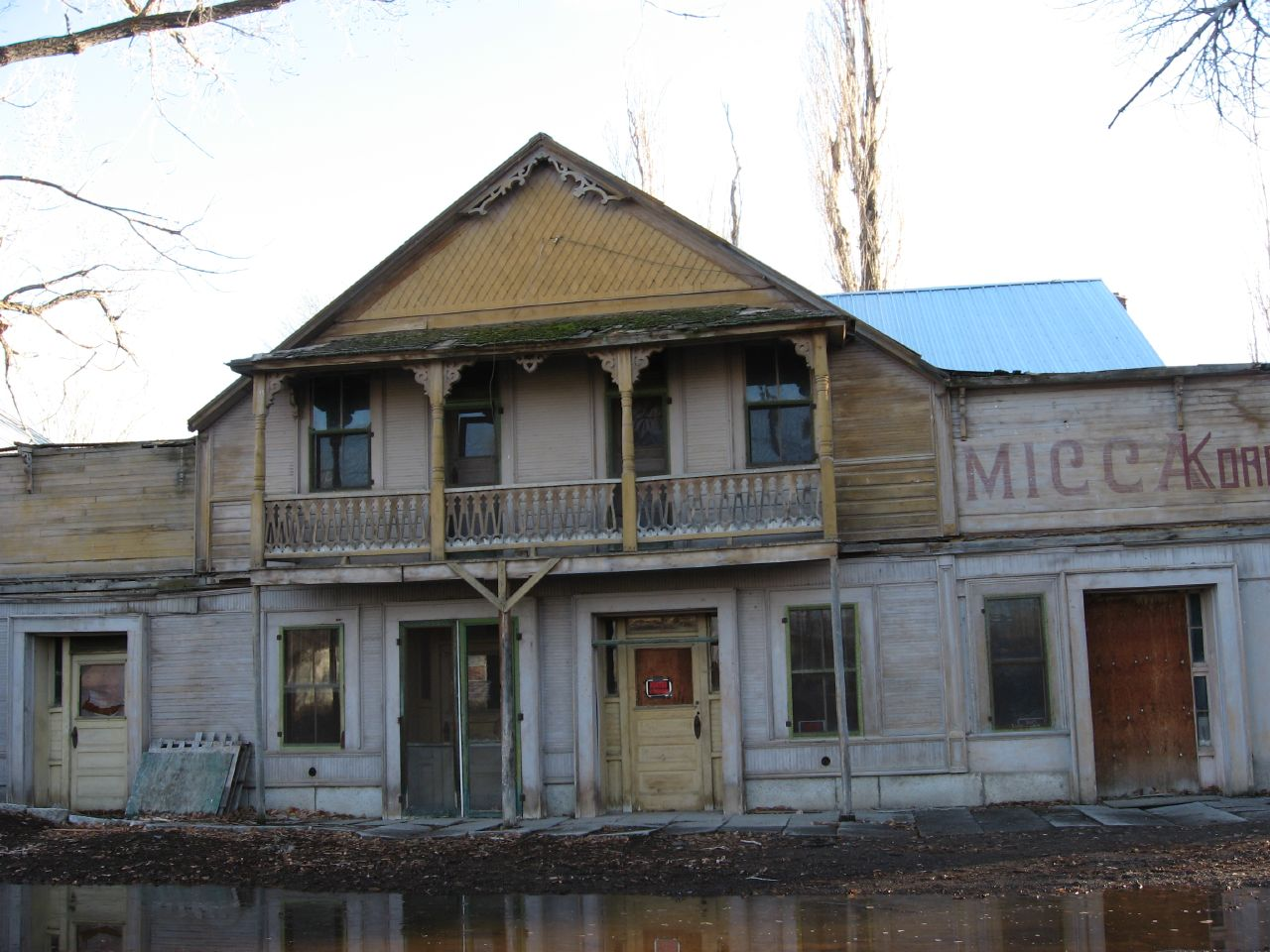
Micca House

The Micca House, on Bridge St. in Paradise Valley, Nevada, is a historic house that was built in 1885. It includes Stick/Eastlake architecture. The building served as a department store, as a post office, and as a government office. It is listed on the National Register of Historic Places.

In its NRHP nomination, written by its owner, it was argued to be "locally significant to its community for the great diversity of functions it contained, all vital in their time to the life of Paradise Valley." It was listed on the NRHP in 1975.
