= Elko Main Post Office =

- U.S. Post Office-Elko Main
- U.S. National Register of Historic Places
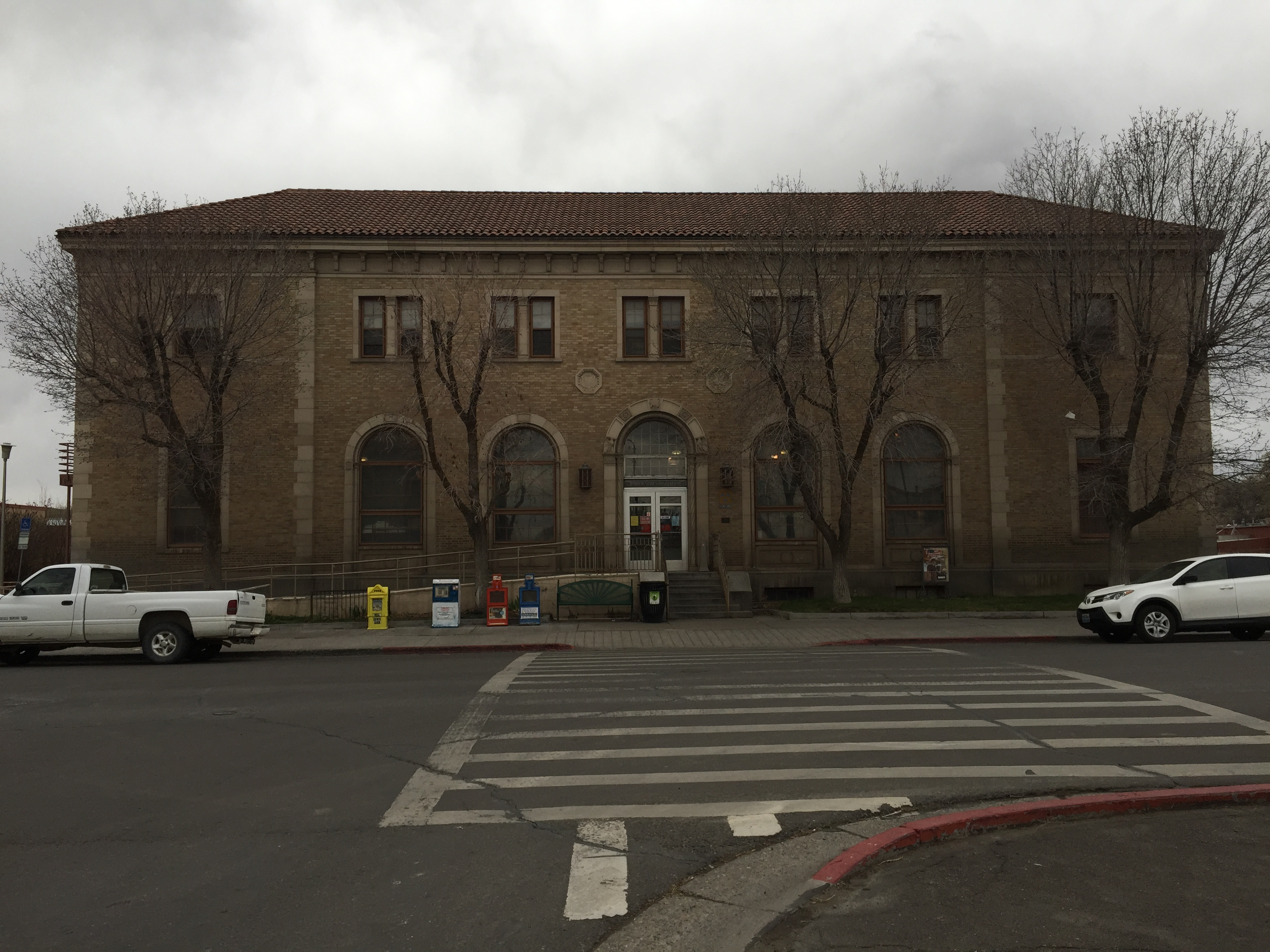

- Location within Nevada Location within the United States
- Location: 275 Third, Elko, Nevada
- Coordinates: 40°49′48″N 115°45′47″W
- Area: 0.6 acres (0.24 ha)
- Built: 1933
- Built by: Madsen, Carl C.
- Architect: Office of the Supervising Architect under James A. Wetmore
- Architectural style: Late 19th and 20th Century Revivals, Mediterranean Revival
- MPS: US Post Offices in Nevada MPS
- NRHP reference No.: 90000133
- Added to NRHP: February 28, 1990

The Elko Main Post Office, located at 275 Third in Elko, Nevada, was built in 1933. Its Mediterranean Revival design is credited to the Office of the Supervising Architect under James A. Wetmore. It is listed on the National Register of Historic Places (NRHP).

It is a combination post office and federal office building. It is a two-story tall building, with a brick exterior and quoins at the corners, upon a raised basement. Molded terra cotta is used for details in the quoins, cornice, brackets and other elements. Its NRHP nomination argues that the building's design achieves an "imposing and stately" status, and that it is the city's "first and only federal building and represents the efforts of local lobbying efforts to gain federal recognition for the city."

It was listed on the National Register in 1990 as U.S. Post Office-Elko Main.
