= Tonopah Main Post Office =

- US Post Office–Tonopah Main
- U.S. National Register of Historic Places
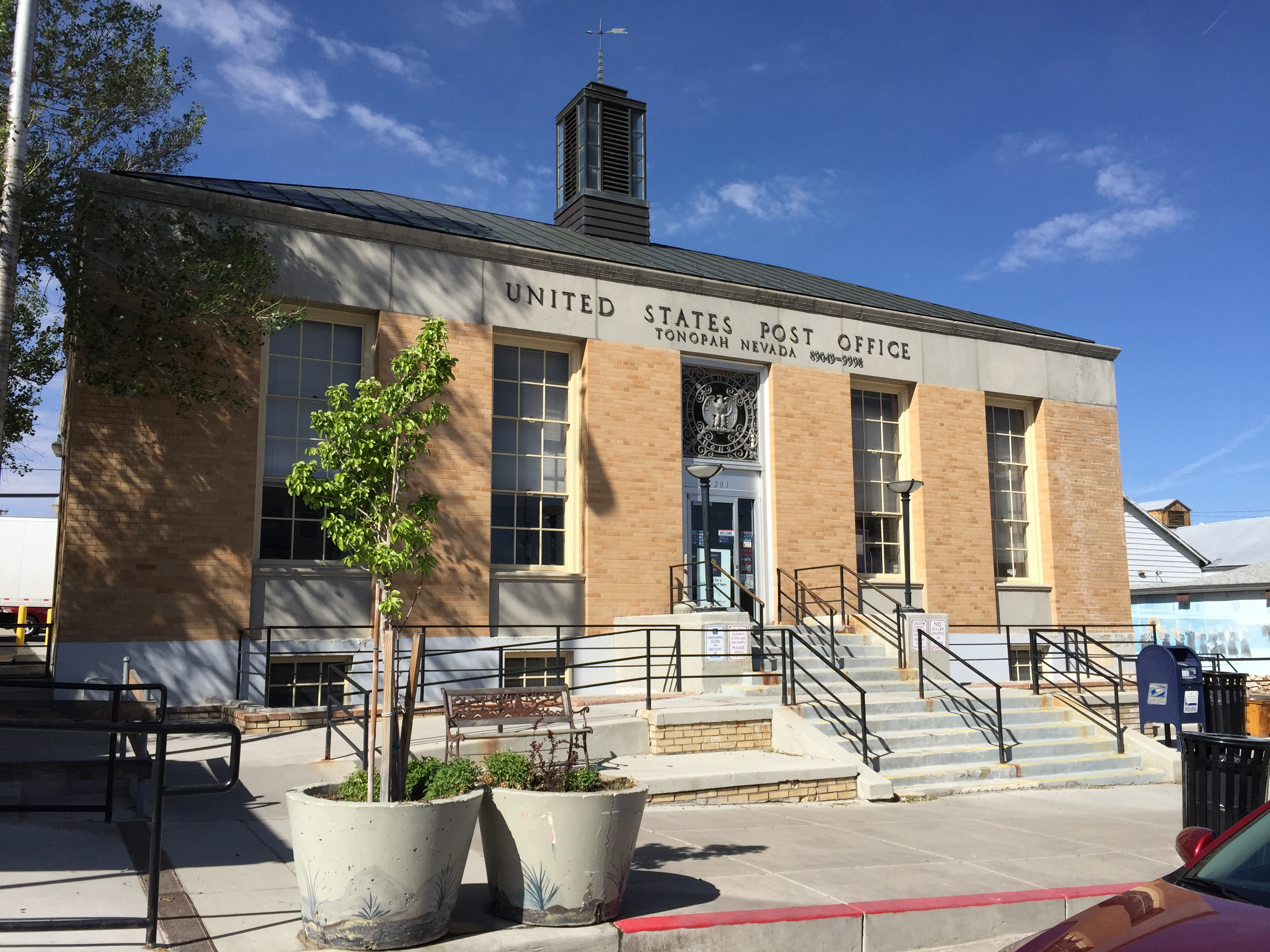
- In 2015

- Location within Nevada Location within the United States
- Location: 201 Main St., Tonopah, Nevada
- Coordinates: 38°4′3″N 117°13′47″W
- Area: 0.3 acres (0.12 ha)
- Built: 1941
- Built by: Dow, L.F. & Co.
- Architect: Simon, Louis A.
- Architectural style: Moderne, Starved Classical
- MPS: US Post Offices in Nevada MPS
- NRHP reference No.: 90000136
- Added to NRHP: February 28, 1990

The Tonopah Main Post Office, also known as US Post Office–Tonopah Main, is the main post office in Tonopah, Nevada. Built in 1941, the post office was the first and only federally constructed post office in the city. The post office was designed in a Starved Classical style typical of federal buildings of the era. The government began planning the post office in 1937, and its site was chosen in 1940. The building's cornerstone was laid in May 1941; a civic ceremony and parade marked the occasion. The post office opened for business on December 7, 1941, the same day as the attack on Pearl Harbor. In addition to serving as Tonopah's post office, the building also houses government offices in its basement.

The post office was added to the National Register of Historic Places on February 28, 1990.
