= Ely, Nevada =

City in Nevada, United States

Ely
- City
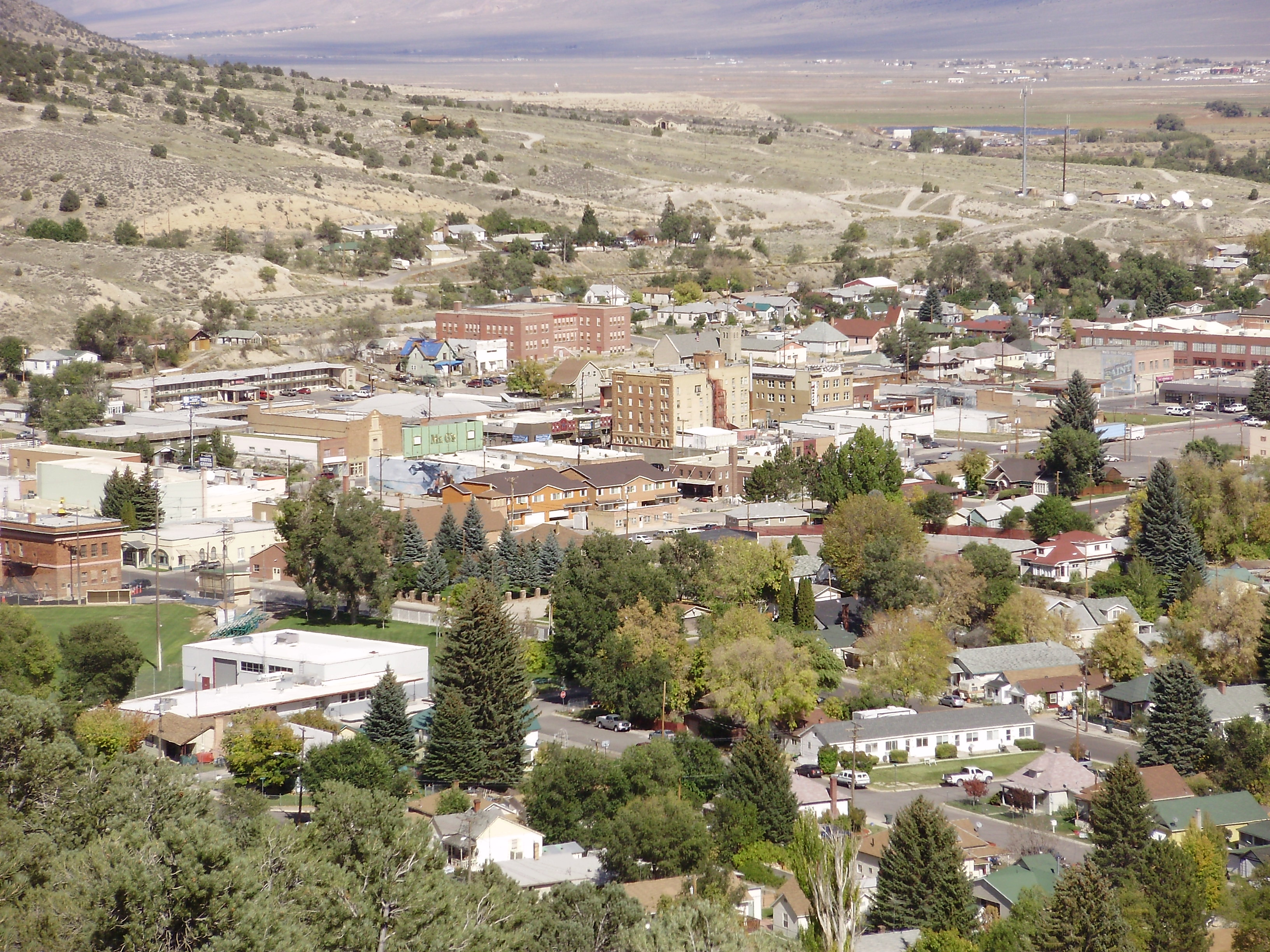
- Downtown Ely

- Logo

- Location of Ely, Nevada

- Location in Nevada Location in the United States
- Coordinates: 39°15′12″N 114°52′38″W
- Country: United States
- State: Nevada
- County: White Pine

Government
  - Mayor: Nathan Robertson

Area
  - Total: 7.63 sq mi (19.75 km^{2})
  - Land: 7.63 sq mi (19.75 km^{2})
  - Water: 0 sq mi (0.00 km^{2})
- Elevation: 6,339 ft (1,932 m)

Population (2020)
  - Total: 3,924
  - Density: 514.6/sq mi (198.68/km^{2})
- Time zone: UTC−8 (Pacific (PST))
  - Summer (DST): UTC−7 (PDT)
- ZIP codes: 89301, 89315
- Area code: 775
- FIPS code: 32-23500
- GNIS feature ID: 2410435
- Website: www.cityofelynv.gov

Ely (/ˈiːli/, EE-lee) is the only city in and the county seat of White Pine County, Nevada, United States. Ely was founded as a stagecoach station along the Pony Express and Central Overland Route. In 1906 copper was discovered. Ely's mining boom came later than the other towns along US 50. The railroads connecting the transcontinental railroad to the mines in Austin, Nevada and Eureka, Nevada have long been removed, but the railroad to Ely is preserved as a heritage railway by the Nevada Northern Railway and known as the Ghost Train of Old Ely. As of the 2020 census, the population was 3,924.

== History ==
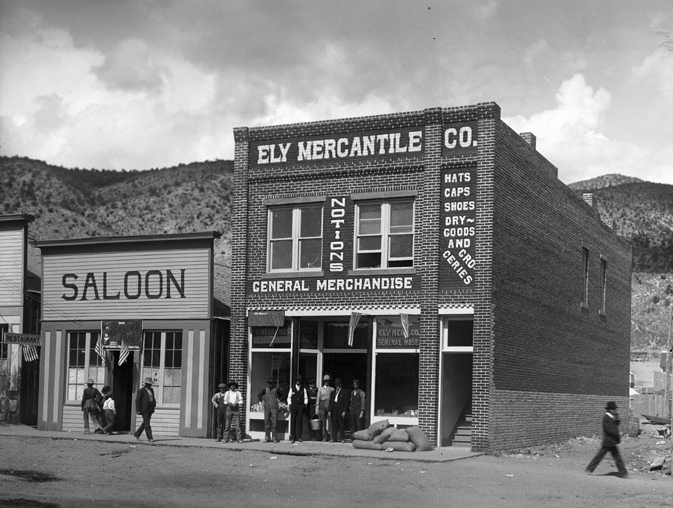
Ely, 1906

In 1878, Vermont resident J. W. Long came to White Pine County and soon set up a camp known as "Ely", after discovering gold. The name "Ely" has been credited to several possible origins: Long's hometown of Ely, Vermont; a New York Congressman with the surname Ely, who sent Long as a representative according to local historians; Smith Ely, a Vermont native who financed one of the city's early mineral operations; and John Ely, an Illinois native who came to Nevada for mining.

Ely was founded as a stagecoach station along the Central Overland Route. Ely's mining boom came later than the other towns along US 50, with the discovery of copper in 1906. This made Ely a mining town, suffering through the boom-and-bust cycles so common in the West. Originally, Ely was home to a number of copper mining companies, Kennecott Utah Copper being the most famous. With a crash in the copper market in the mid-1970s, Kennecott shut down and copper mining disappeared (temporarily).

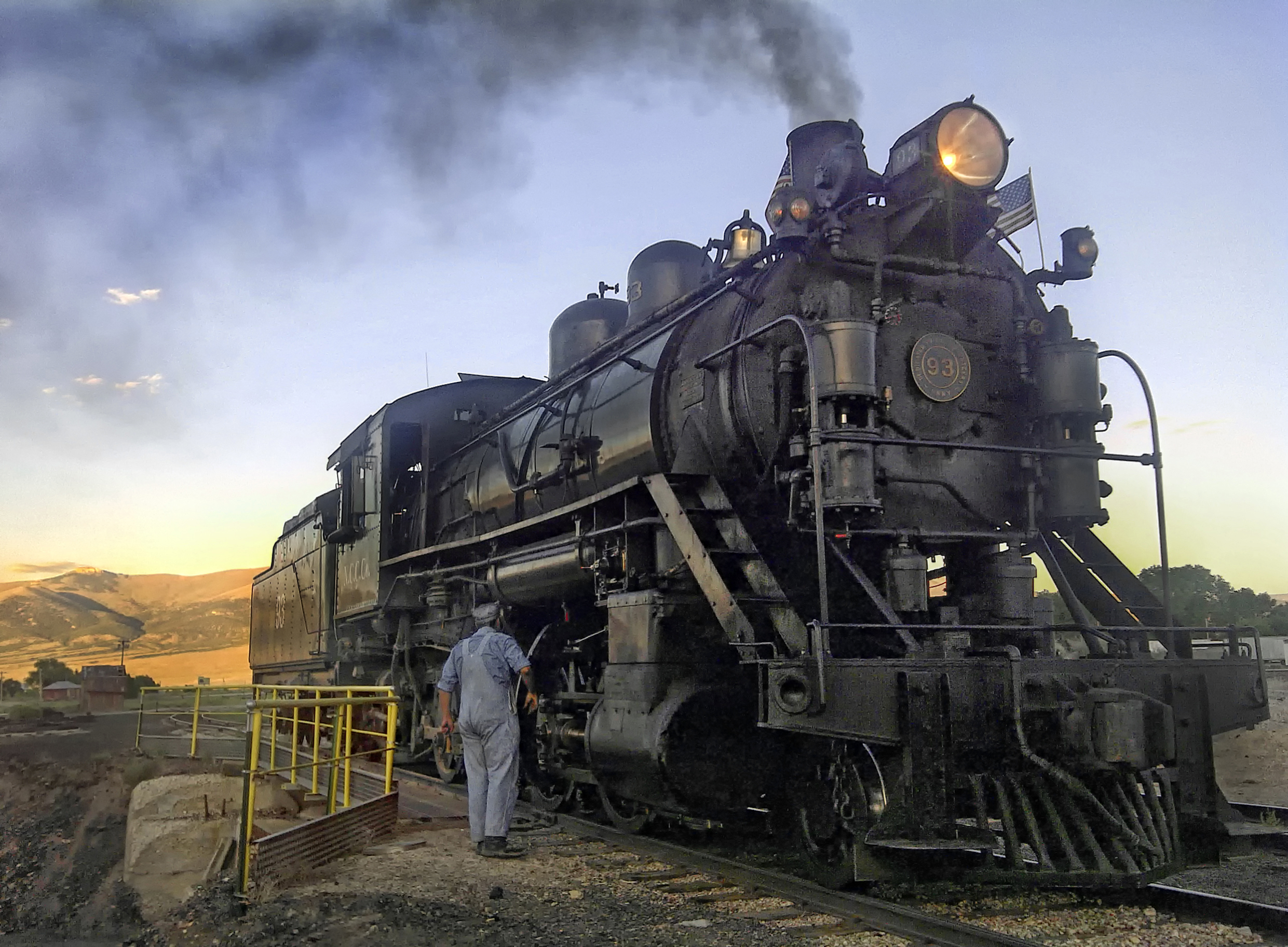
Ely's Nevada Northern Railway, Engine 93

With the advent of cyanide heap leaching—a method of extracting gold from what was previously considered very low-grade ore—the next boom was on. Many companies processed the massive piles of "overburden" that had been removed from copper mines, or expanded the existing open-pit mines to extract the gold ore. Gold mines as widespread as the Robinson project near Ruth, and AmSelco's Alligator Ridge mine 65 miles (105 km) from Ely, kept the town alive during the 1980s and 1990s, until the recent revival of copper mining.

As Kennecott's smelter was demolished, copper concentrate from the mine is now shipped by rail to Seattle, where it is transported to Japan for smelting. The dramatic increase in demand for copper in 2005 has once again made Ely a copper boom town.

The now-defunct BHP Nevada Railroad ran from the mining district south of Ruth through Ely to the junction with the Union Pacific at Shafter from 1996 to 1999.

== Geography and climate ==
Ely is 77 miles (124 km) east of Eureka, Nevada, 153 miles (246 km) west of Delta, Utah, 105 miles (169 km) north of Pioche, Nevada, 139 miles (224 km) south of Wells, Nevada, and 120 miles (190 km) south of West Wendover, Nevada.

According to the United States Census Bureau, the city has a total area of 7.1 square miles (18 km^{2}), all of it land.

Ely experiences a semi-arid climate (Köppen BSk), and extreme day-night temperature differences year-round. Ely's nighttime temperatures account for it being listed as one of the coldest places in the contiguous United States, with an average of 214.9 mornings per year with a minimum temperature of 32 °F (0 °C) or less, 15.7 mornings reaching 0 °F (−17.8 °C) or less, and 21.7 afternoons when the high does not top freezing. On average, the first and last dates of freezing temperatures are September 8 and June 18, respectively, allowing a growing season of only 79 days. Frosts have occurred in every month, even July. The diurnal temperature range of Ely is great due to its elevation, dry air, clear skies, and location in a valley, allowing for intense radiative cooling at sunset, even after hot summer days. The monthly mean temperature ranges from 26.7 °F (−2.9 °C) in January to 69.3 °F (20.7 °C) in July. High temperatures of 90 °F (32 °C) or higher occur on an average of 29.2 days annually, but, due to the elevation and aridity, the low very rarely manages to stay at or above 60 °F or 16 °C. Extreme temperatures ranged from 101 °F (38.3 °C) on July 18, 1998 down to −30 °F (−34.4 °C) on February 6, 1989.

Climate chart for Ely

On average, annual precipitation is 9.41 inches (239 mm), with 72.9 days of measurable precipitation annually. The wettest calendar year is 1897 with 17.20 inches (436.9 mm) and the driest 1974 with 4.22 inches (107.2 mm), though as much as 18.20 inches or 462.3 millimeters fell from July 1982 to June 1983. The most precipitation in one month was 5.52 inches (140.2 mm) in April 1900, and the most in 24 hours was 2.52 inches (64.0 mm) on September 26, 1982. Average annual snowfall is 54.1 inches (1.4 m), while the most snowfall in one month was 42.0 inches (1.1 m) in March 1894, and the greatest depth of snow on the ground 25 inches or 0.64 meters on February 1, 2016 – though data from neighboring Elko suggest greater depths in the winters of 1889/1890, 1915/1916 and 1931/1932. An average winter will see a maximum snow cover of 9 inches or 0.23 meters, though the severe winter of 1951/1952 had fifty days with snow cover over 10 inches or 0.25 meters. The most snowfall in a season has been 110.4 inches (2.8 m) from July 2010 to June 2011 and the least 12.1 inches (0.31 m) from July 1950 to June 1951.

Climate data for Ely, Nevada (Ely Airport), 1991–2020 normals, extremes 1893–present
Month	Jan	Feb	Mar	Apr	May	Jun	Jul	Aug	Sep	Oct	Nov	Dec	Year
Record high °F (°C)	68 (20)	67 (19)	83 (28)	83 (28)	95 (35)	99 (37)	101 (38)	99 (37)	97 (36)	86 (30)	78 (26)	67 (19)	101 (38)
Mean maximum °F (°C)	54.5 (12.5)	57.3 (14.1)	66.9 (19.4)	74.8 (23.8)	83.2 (28.4)	91.4 (33.0)	96.5 (35.8)	93.3 (34.1)	87.9 (31.1)	78.2 (25.7)	67.1 (19.5)	56.0 (13.3)	96.7 (35.9)
Mean daily maximum °F (°C)	41.0 (5.0)	43.8 (6.6)	52.4 (11.3)	58.9 (14.9)	68.9 (20.5)	81.1 (27.3)	89.4 (31.9)	87.3 (30.7)	78.0 (25.6)	64.5 (18.1)	50.9 (10.5)	40.8 (4.9)	63.1 (17.3)
Daily mean °F (°C)	26.7 (−2.9)	30.0 (−1.1)	37.7 (3.2)	43.2 (6.2)	51.5 (10.8)	61.3 (16.3)	69.3 (20.7)	67.5 (19.7)	58.4 (14.7)	46.4 (8.0)	35.1 (1.7)	26.2 (−3.2)	46.1 (7.8)
Mean daily minimum °F (°C)	12.4 (−10.9)	16.2 (−8.8)	22.9 (−5.1)	27.5 (−2.5)	34.0 (1.1)	41.4 (5.2)	49.1 (9.5)	47.6 (8.7)	38.8 (3.8)	28.3 (−2.1)	19.2 (−7.1)	11.7 (−11.3)	29.1 (−1.6)
Mean minimum °F (°C)	−9.6 (−23.1)	−5.7 (−20.9)	4.7 (−15.2)	12.2 (−11.0)	20.6 (−6.3)	28.4 (−2.0)	38.5 (3.6)	36.8 (2.7)	24.9 (−3.9)	12.2 (−11.0)	0.5 (−17.5)	−9.3 (−22.9)	−14.9 (−26.1)
Record low °F (°C)	−27 (−33)	−30 (−34)	−13 (−25)	−5 (−21)	7 (−14)	18 (−8)	28 (−2)	24 (−4)	15 (−9)	−7 (−22)	−20 (−29)	−29 (−34)	−30 (−34)
Average precipitation inches (mm)	0.75 (19)	0.84 (21)	0.98 (25)	1.07 (27)	1.05 (27)	0.56 (14)	0.63 (16)	0.79 (20)	0.64 (16)	0.80 (20)	0.63 (16)	0.67 (17)	9.41 (239)
Average snowfall inches (cm)	10.5 (27)	9.1 (23)	9.5 (24)	5.6 (14)	2.0 (5.1)	0.0 (0.0)	0.0 (0.0)	0.0 (0.0)	0.2 (0.51)	2.0 (5.1)	5.9 (15)	9.6 (24)	54.1 (137)
Average extreme snow depth inches (cm)	8 (20)	7 (18)	5 (13)	3 (7.6)	1 (2.5)	0 (0)	0 (0)	0 (0)	0 (0)	1 (2.5)	4 (10)	6 (15)	9 (23)
Average precipitation days (≥ 0.01 in)	7.1	7.0	6.5	8.4	7.6	4.2	5.4	5.8	4.7	4.8	5.0	6.6	72.9
Average snowy days (≥ 0.1 in)	5.9	5.9	5.2	4.4	1.4	0.1	0.0	0.0	0.0	1.1	3.7	6.0	33.7
Average relative humidity (%)	65.3	64.5	59.4	51.8	47.0	39.8	35.2	38.7	42.4	50.5	59.6	64.3	51.5
Average dew point °F (°C)	12.6 (−10.8)	16.9 (−8.4)	19.4 (−7.0)	21.9 (−5.6)	27.7 (−2.4)	31.5 (−0.3)	35.4 (1.9)	36.0 (2.2)	29.8 (−1.2)	24.3 (−4.3)	18.7 (−7.4)	12.7 (−10.7)	23.9 (−4.5)
Mean monthly sunshine hours	215.0	211.0	265.0	286.8	329.3	362.8	365.3	335.8	309.1	266.5	199.6	197.8	3,344
Percentage possible sunshine	71	70	71	72	74	81	81	79	83	77	66	68	75
Source: NOAA (sun, dew points and relative humidity 1961–1990)

== Demographics ==
Historical population
Census	Pop.	Note	%±
1890	203		—
1900	525		158.6%
1910	2,055		291.4%
1920	2,090		1.7%
1930	3,045		45.7%
1940	4,140		36.0%
1950	3,558		−14.1%
1960	4,018		12.9%
1970	4,176		3.9%
1980	4,882		16.9%
1990	4,756		−2.6%
2000	4,041		−15.0%
2010	4,255		5.3%
2020	3,924		−7.8%
U.S. Decennial Census

=== 2020 census ===
As of the 2020 census, Ely had a population of 3,924. The median age was 40.2 years. 23.5% of residents were under the age of 18 and 19.7% of residents were 65 years of age or older. For every 100 females there were 108.3 males, and for every 100 females age 18 and over there were 108.8 males age 18 and over.

98.6% of residents lived in urban areas, while 1.4% lived in rural areas.

There were 1,695 households in Ely, of which 28.2% had children under the age of 18 living in them. Of all households, 39.0% were married-couple households, 28.1% were households with a male householder and no spouse or partner present, and 24.7% were households with a female householder and no spouse or partner present. About 34.4% of all households were made up of individuals and 14.4% had someone living alone who was 65 years of age or older.

There were 2,084 housing units, of which 18.7% were vacant. The homeowner vacancy rate was 2.4% and the rental vacancy rate was 14.8%.

Racial composition as of the 2020 census
Race	Number	Percent
White	3,121	79.5%
Black or African American	36	0.9%
American Indian and Alaska Native	124	3.2%
Asian	49	1.2%
Native Hawaiian and Other Pacific Islander	12	0.3%
Some other race	224	5.7%
Two or more races	358	9.1%
Hispanic or Latino (of any race)	669	17.0%

=== 2000 census ===
As of the census of 2000, there were 4,041 people, 1,727 households, and 1,065 families residing in the city. The population density was 567 inhabitants per square mile (219/km^{2}). There were 2,205 housing units at an average density of 309 per square mile (119/km^{2}). The racial makeup of the city was 89.14% White, 0.32% African American, 3.12% Native American, 1.09% Asian, 0.35% Pacific Islander, 3.71% from other races, and 2.28% from two or more races. Hispanic or Latino of any race were 12.35% of the population.

There were 1,727 households, out of which 28.6% had children under the age of 18 living with them, 46.4% were married couples living together, 10.2% had a female householder with no husband present, and 38.3% were non-families. 33.7% of all households were made up of individuals, and 13.1% had someone living alone who was 65 years of age or older. The average household size was 2.30 and the average family size was 2.94.

In the city, the population was spread out, with 25.7% under the age of 18, 6.3% from 18 to 24, 23.8% from 25 to 44, 27.0% from 45 to 64, and 17.2% who were 65 years of age or older. The median age was 41 years. For every 100 females, there were 98 males. For every 100 females age 18 and over, there were 96 males.

The median income for a household in the city was $36,408, and the median income for a family was $42,168. Males had a median income of $36,016 versus $26,597 for females. The per capita income for the city was $17,013. About 11% of families and 12% of the population were below the poverty line, including 12% of those under age 18 and 9% of those aged 65 or over.

== Economy ==
=== Tourism ===
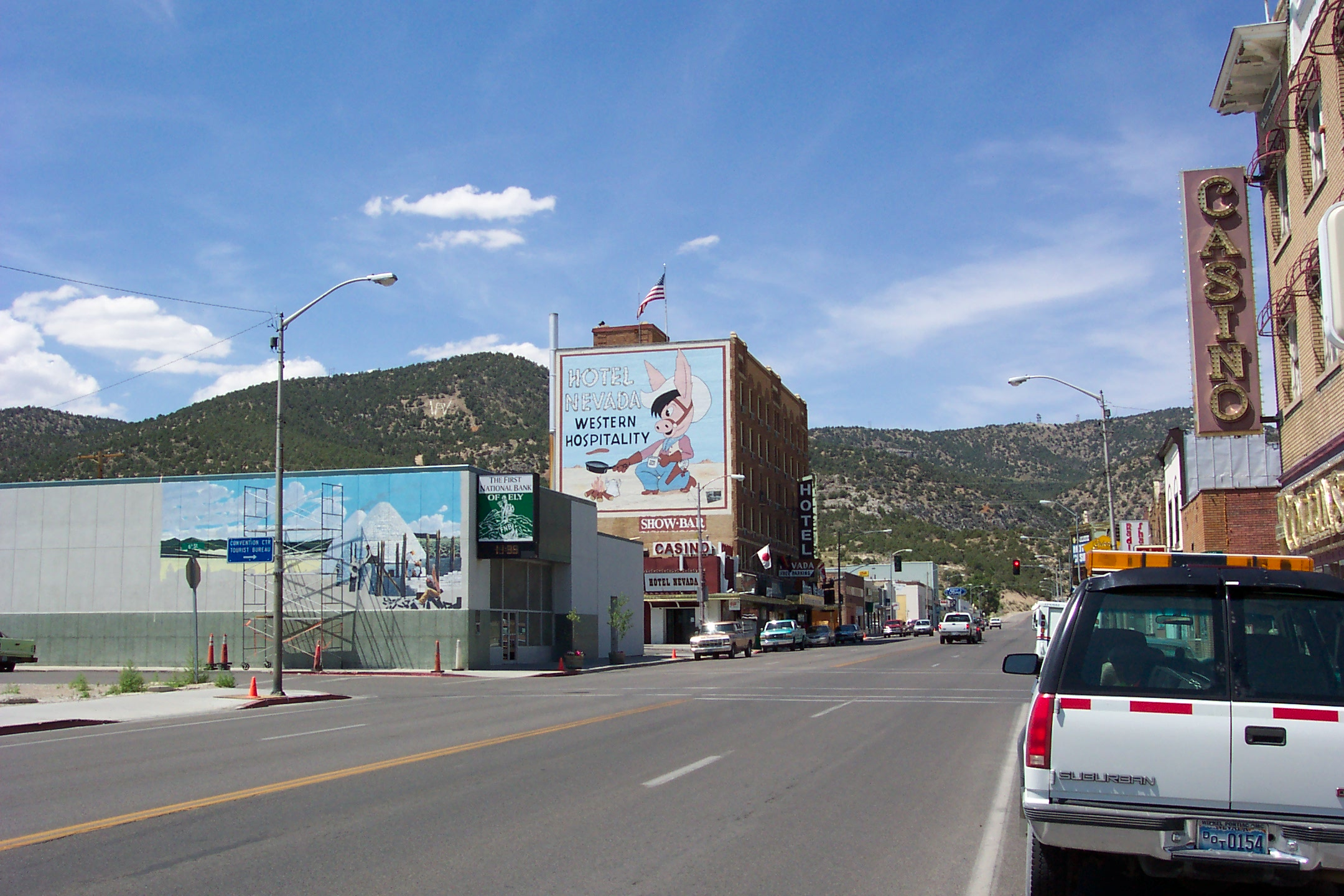
Ely in 2003

Ely is a tourism center, and is home of the Nevada Northern Railway Museum. The railroad museum features the Ghost Train of Old Ely, a working steam-engine passenger train that travels the historic tracks from Ely to the Robinson mining district.

Ely is the nearest city to the proposed site of the Clock of the Long Now on Mount Washington.

The historic six-story Hotel Nevada and Gambling Hall is in downtown Ely. Opened in 1929, it was the tallest building in Nevada until 1931 and was the state's first fire-proof building. It is a popular lodging, dining, gaming, and tourist stop.

The long stretch of road on State Route 318 near Ely is known for the annual 90 miles (140 km) Silver State Classic Challenge course, an authorized time-trial Cannonball Run-style race that attracts entries from all over the world.

The Ely Renaissance Society is responsible for more than 20 outdoor murals and sculptures in the downtown area. Artists from all over the world have been commissioned to create images of area history, using different art styles. They also maintain a historical village consisting of a general store and several shotgun houses which display the history of the people that came to the area to work for the railroad and the mine.

Ely is also home to regional offices of the U.S. Bureau of Land Management, U.S. Forest Service, and Nevada Department of Wildlife.

==== Outdoors and recreation ====
Nearby are Great Basin National Park, Cave Lake State Park, the Ward Charcoal Ovens State Historic Park, and the state parks of Lincoln County, Nevada.

Ely was the host of the 2016 National Speleological Society's annual convention. The Bureau of Land Management operates an area supporting an elk herd south of town. The Ely Elk Viewing Area offers visitors the opportunity to see an elk community up close.

=== Mining ===
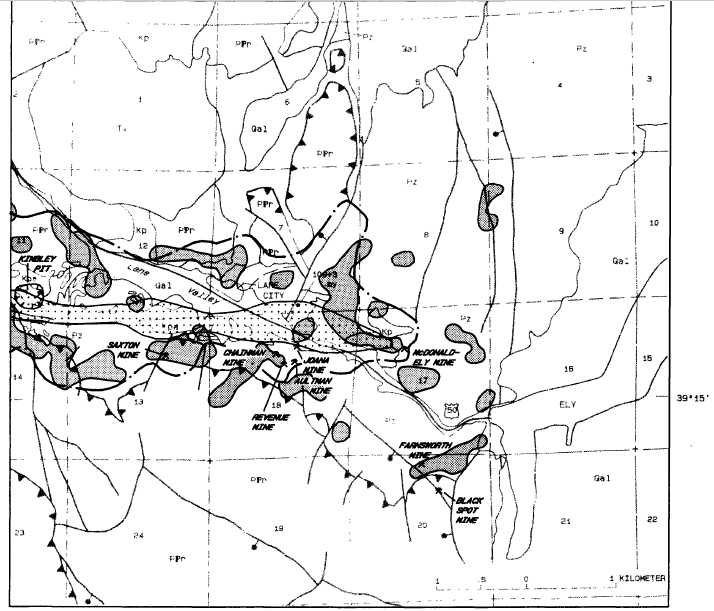
Geologic structure map showing mining operations west of Ely. Hatched area indicates traces of copper while the shaded area indicates traces of gold

Starting in 1867, iron-rich gossans were mined for precious metals in Lane Valley west of Ely. The Aultman and Saxton Mines were operating by the 1870s. The Chainman Mine was developed by the 1890s and became the most productive in the area. Starting in 1903, copper was mined by the Giroux Consolidated Mining Company and by the Nevada Consolidated Copper Company in 1904. In 1913, Consolidated Copper Mines Company took over Giroux.

In 1936, Fulton and Smith first described magnesite, yet by 1942, when deposits were first studied no magnesite mining existed.

In 1943, Kennecott Copper Corporation took over Nevada Consolidated and by 1958 had consolidated all of the properties in the district.

KGHM International Ltd. owns a large copper mine, formerly owned by Quadra FNX, employing 510 people near Ely.

The Joana Mine in Robinson Canyon, 2 miles North of Ely, has exposed a limestone geologic formation named the Joana Limestone after the mine.

== Sports ==
From 2006 through 2014, the UNLV Rebels football team of the University of Nevada, Las Vegas held training camp in Ely.

== Infrastructure ==
=== Air ===
Commercial air service was available at Ely Airport until March 31, 2013. In 2011, the Ely Airport was frequently cited as one of the rural airports receiving federal subsidies through the Essential Air Service program.

=== Roads ===
- U.S. Route 6
- U.S. Route 50 (Ely is the eastern end of the portion of U.S. Route 50 known as "The Loneliest Road in America")
- U.S. Route 93

The historic Lincoln Highway, the first road across America, went through Ely, entering town from the north on U.S. Route 93 and departing town to the west on U.S. Route 50. Ely is home to the most isolated charging station in the United States.

== Education ==
Ely has a public library, a branch of the White Pine County Library. Ely is part of the White Pine County School District.

== Media ==
Ely's local newspaper is The Bristlecone Tribune. Ely has two local radio stations: KDSS (92.7 FM), which is White Pine County's only music station, and KELY (1230 AM). KELY is heard across much of rural Nevada as the flagship of the Nevada Talk Network.

== Notable people ==
- Helen Delich Bentley - born to Yugoslavian parents and graduating from Ely High School, she was appointed by Richard Nixon to lead the Federal Maritime Regulatory Agency in 1969. She served as a representative for Maryland in the US Congress from 1985 to 1995.
- Albert J. Carpenter (9 June 1911 - 21 June 1999), officer in the United States Coast Guard from 1933 to 1968
- Patricia Nixon - Former first lady of the United States was born in Ely. Her father was a miner in the area and the family left when Patricia was two years old. Pat and her husband Richard Nixon visited the area during his 1952 vice-presidential campaign.

== In popular culture ==
- Operation Haylift (1950), by director William A. Berke, is about a historical event that took place in White Pine County.
- Lust for Freedom (1987), a film directed by Eric Louzil.
- Once Upon a Texas Train (1988), a television film directed by Burt Kennedy.
- Roadside Prophets (1992), an independent film directed by Abbe Wool.
- Guncrazy (1992), a film directed by Tamra Davis and starring Drew Barrymore.
- Rat Race (2001), a film directed by Jerry Zucker, with its climactic scene shot in and around the restored train depot of the railway museum.
- "Laying Low in Eli, Nevada" (2005), a song performed by David Dondero for his South of the South album.
- My Blueberry Nights (2007), a film directed by Wong Kar-wai.
- "Ely Nevada" (2008), a song performed by Ry Cooder for the My Blueberry Nights soundtrack.
- Play Dead (2009), a film directed by Jason Wiles.
- Horror in the High Desert (2021), based and filmed in the Ely area.

== See also ==
- Northern Hotel
