= National Register of Historic Places listings in Carson City, Nevada =

Contents: National Register of Historic Places listings in Carson City, Nevada, USA:

The locations of National Register properties and districts (at least for all showing latitude and longitude coordinates below), may be seen in an online map by clicking on "Map of all coordinates".

This National Park Service list is complete through NPS recent listings posted April 24, 2026.

Contents: Counties in Nevada / See also: Nevada state-wide list
- Carson City
- Churchill
- Clark
- Douglas
- Elko
- Esmeralda
- Eureka
- Humboldt
- Lander
- Lincoln
- Lyon
- Mineral
- Nye
- Pershing
- Storey
- Washoe
- White Pine

| | Name on the Register | Image | Date listed | Location | City or town | Description |
|---|---|---|---|---|---|---|
| 1 | Adams House | Adams House | June 10, 1999 (#99000700) | 990 N. Minnesota St. 39°10′09″N 119°46′11″W | Carson City | |
| 2 | Bank Saloon | Bank Saloon | December 10, 1980 (#80004483) | 418 S. Carson St. 39°09′40″N 119°45′58″W | Carson City | |
| 3 | Belknap House | Belknap House | October 30, 1997 (#97001302) | 1206 N. Nevada St. 39°10′09″N 119°46′04″W | Carson City | |
| 4 | Brougher Mansion | Brougher Mansion | August 11, 1980 (#80004274) | 204 W. Spear St. 39°10′00″N 119°46′22″W | Carson City | |
| 5 | Carson Brewing Company | Carson Brewing Company | August 18, 1978 (#78003210) | 102 S. Division St. 39°09′49″N 119°46′07″W | Carson City | |
| 6 | Carson City Civic Auditorium | Carson City Civic Auditorium | June 19, 1990 (#90000912) | 813 N. Carson St. 39°09′36″N 119°45′19″W | Carson City | |
| 7 | Carson City Post Office | Carson City Post Office | February 9, 1979 (#79003440) | 401 N. Carson St. 39°10′00″N 119°45′57″W | Carson City | Formerly the U.S. Court House & Post Office, now home to the Nevada Commission on Tourism |
| 8 | Carson City Public Buildings | Carson City Public Buildings | October 2, 1987 (#87001625) | Carson St. 39°09′49″N 119°46′41″W | Carson City | |
| 9 | Dr. William Henry Cavell House | Dr. William Henry Cavell House | June 22, 1987 (#86001655) | 402 W. Robinson St. 39°10′02″N 119°46′46″W | Carson City | |
| 10 | Orion Clemens House | Orion Clemens House | March 12, 1979 (#79003439) | 502 N. Division St. 39°10′00″N 119°46′07″W | Carson City | |
| 11 | Abraham Curry House | Abraham Curry House | March 30, 1987 (#87000501) | 406 N. Nevada St. 39°09′57″N 119°46′08″W | Carson City | |
| 12 | Dat So La Lee House | Dat So La Lee House | June 6, 1994 (#94000553) | 331 W. Proctor St. 39°09′55″N 119°46′03″W | Carson City | |
| 13 | Foreman-Roberts House | Foreman-Roberts House | January 3, 1978 (#78003213) | 1217 N. Carson St. 39°10′19″N 119°45′57″W | Carson City | |
| 14 | The Glenbrook | The Glenbrook | May 1, 1981 (#81000702) | 600 N. Carson St. 39°10′07″N 119°43′54″W | Carson City | |
| 15 | Governor's Mansion | Governor's Mansion | October 22, 1976 (#76002242) | 606 Mountain St. 39°10′04″N 119°46′20″W | Carson City | |
| 16 | Kitzmeyer Furniture Factory | Kitzmeyer Furniture Factory | June 22, 1987 (#87000714) | 319 N. Carson St. 39°09′58″N 119°45′15″W | Carson City | |
| 17 | Lakeview House | Lakeview House | January 5, 1978 (#78003211) | U.S. Route 395 south of E. Lake Blvd. 39°12′29″N 119°48′13″W | Carson City | |
| 18 | Leport-Toupin House | Leport-Toupin House | September 16, 1985 (#85002407) | 503 E. Telegraph St. 39°09′57″N 119°45′42″W | Carson City | |
| 19 | Marlette Lake Water System | Marlette Lake Water System | September 16, 1992 (#92001162) | Roughly from Marlette Lake east to State Route 80; 39°13′15″N 119°49′17″W | Carson City | |
| 20 | McKeen Motor Car #70 | McKeen Motor Car #70 | September 6, 2005 (#05000968) | Nevada State Railroad Museum; 39°08′55″N 119°46′03″W | Carson City | National Historic Landmark designation October 16, 2012 |
| 21 | Lew M. Meder House | Lew M. Meder House | August 2, 1978 (#78003075) | 308 N. Nevada St. 39°09′56″N 119°46′04″W | Carson City | |
| 22 | Nevada State Capitol | Nevada State Capitol | June 10, 1975 (#75002126) | 101 N. Carson St. 39°09′50″N 119°45′54″W | Carson City | |
| 23 | Nevada State Printing Office | Nevada State Printing Office | March 29, 1978 (#78003212) | 101 S. Fall St. 39°09′49″N 119°45′50″W | Carson City | |
| 24 | Nevada State Prison | Nevada State Prison | September 22, 2015 (#15000320) | 3301 E. 5th St. 39°09′37″N 119°44′15″W | Carson City | |
| 25 | Gov. James W. Nye Mansion | Gov. James W. Nye Mansion | April 16, 1975 (#75002128) | 108 N. Minnesota St. 39°09′52″N 119°46′11″W | Carson City | |
| 26 | Olcovich-Meyers House | Olcovich-Meyers House | July 29, 1993 (#93000682) | 214 W. King St. 39°09′51″N 119°46′03″W | Carson City | |
| 27 | Ormsby-Rosser House | Ormsby-Rosser House | May 17, 1979 (#79003437) | 304 S. Minnesota St. 39°09′44″N 119°46′11″W | Carson City | |
| 28 | Raycraft Ranch | Raycraft Ranch | May 4, 1976 (#76002243) | North of Carson City on U.S. Route 395; 39°11′32″N 119°46′44″W | Carson City | |
| 29 | Rinckel Mansion | Rinckel Mansion | November 20, 1975 (#75002129) | 102 N. Curry St. 39°09′51″N 119°46′01″W | Carson City | |
| 30 | Gov. Reinhold Sadler House | Gov. Reinhold Sadler House | March 2, 1979 (#79003436) | 310 Mountain St. 39°09′55″N 119°46′20″W | Carson City | |
| 31 | St. Charles-Muller's Hotel | St. Charles-Muller's Hotel | May 27, 1982 (#82003209) | 302-304-310 S. Carson St. 39°09′43″N 119°45′58″W | Carson City | |
| 32 | St. Peter's Episcopal Church | St. Peter's Episcopal Church | January 3, 1978 (#78003215) | 312 N. Division St. 39°09′56″N 119°46′09″W | Carson City | |
| 33 | George L. Sanford House | George L. Sanford House | December 19, 1994 (#94001472) | 405 N. Roop St. 39°10′03″N 119°42′47″W | Carson City | |
| 34 | Sears–Ferris House | Sears–Ferris House | February 9, 1979 (#79003438) | 311 W. 3rd St. 39°09′44″N 119°46′06″W | Carson City | |
| 35 | Second Railroad Car No. 21 | Second Railroad Car No. 21 | December 1, 1978 (#78003214) | Nevada State Railroad Museum, located at 2180 S. Carson St. 39°08′51″N 119°46′06″W | Carson City | |
| 36 | David Smaill House | David Smaill House | September 16, 1985 (#85002408) | 313 W. Ann St. 39°10′16″N 119°46′06″W | Carson City | |
| 37 | William Spence House | William Spence House | July 18, 1985 (#85001602) | 308 S. Thompson St. 39°09′45″N 119°46′14″W | Carson City | |
| 38 | Stewart Indian School | Stewart Indian School | September 18, 1985 (#85002432) | South of Carson City off U.S. Route 395; 39°06′51″N 119°45′21″W | Carson City | |
| 39 | U.S. Mint | U.S. Mint | September 5, 1975 (#75002127) | 600 N. Carson St. 39°10′03″N 119°45′59″W | Carson City | |
| 40 | Virginia and Truckee Railroad Depot-Carson City | Virginia and Truckee Railroad Depot-Carson City | September 30, 1998 (#98001208) | 729 N. Carson St. 39°10′04″N 119°45′55″W | Carson City | |
| 41 | Virginia and Truckee Railway Locomotive No. 27 | Virginia and Truckee Railway Locomotive No. 27 | October 27, 2004 (#04001198) | Nevada State Railroad Museum, located at 2180 S. Carson St. 39°08′58″N 119°46′00″W | Carson City | |
| 42 | Virginia and Truckee RR. Engines No. 18, The Dayton and No. 22, The Inyo | Virginia and Truckee RR. Engines No. 18, The Dayton | December 18, 1973 (#73002245) | Nevada State Railroad Museum, located at the northeastern corner of Colorado and Carson Sts. 39°08′50″N 119°45′55″W | Carson City | |
| 43 | Wabuska Railroad Station | Wabuska Railroad Station | August 30, 1984 (#84002070) | S. Carson St. 39°09′00″N 119°46′00″W | Carson City | |
| 44 | West Side Historic District | West Side Historic District | November 2, 2011 (#11000785) | Roughly bounded by Curry, Mountain, 5th & John Sts. 39°09′59″N 119°46′13″W | Carson City | |

== Former listings ==
| | Name on the Register | Image | Date listed | Date removed | Location | City or town | Description |
|---|---|---|---|---|---|---|---|
| 1 | Virginia and Truckee Railroad Shops | | December 2, 1977 (#77001508) | October 13, 2000 | Between Stewart and Plaza Streets | Carson City | Demolished in 1991. |

== See also ==
- List of National Historic Landmarks in Nevada
- National Register of Historic Places listings in Nevada
