= Curry House =

Curry House may refer to:

== Food ==
- A restaurant serving South Asian cuisine, particularly in the UK, Australia, and Europe
  - Curry house (United Kingdom), a type of restaurant in the United Kingdom
- Curry House (restaurant chain), a defunct chain of fast-food restaurants in California, U.S.

== Buildings in the United States ==
Alphabetical by state, then city

- J. L. M. Curry House, Talladega, Alabama, listed on the National Register of Historic Places (NRHP)
- Curry-Chucovich House, Denver, Colorado, NRHP-listed in downtown Denver
- Stockton-Curry House, Quincy, Florida, NRHP-listed
- Curry Hill Plantation, Bainbridge, Georgia, NRHP-listed
- Daniel Curry House, Harrodsburg, Kentucky, NRHP-listed in Mercer County
- Solomon S. Curry House, Ironwood, Michigan, NRHP-listed
- Abraham Curry House, Carson City, Nevada, NRHP-listed
- Nathaniel Curry House, Roseburg, Oregon, NRHP-listed in Douglas County
- Lewis Curry House, Vernal, Utah, NRHP-listed
