= Carson Hot Springs =

Natural hot spring in Carson City, Nevada, US

Coordinates: 39°11′40″N 119°45′07″W

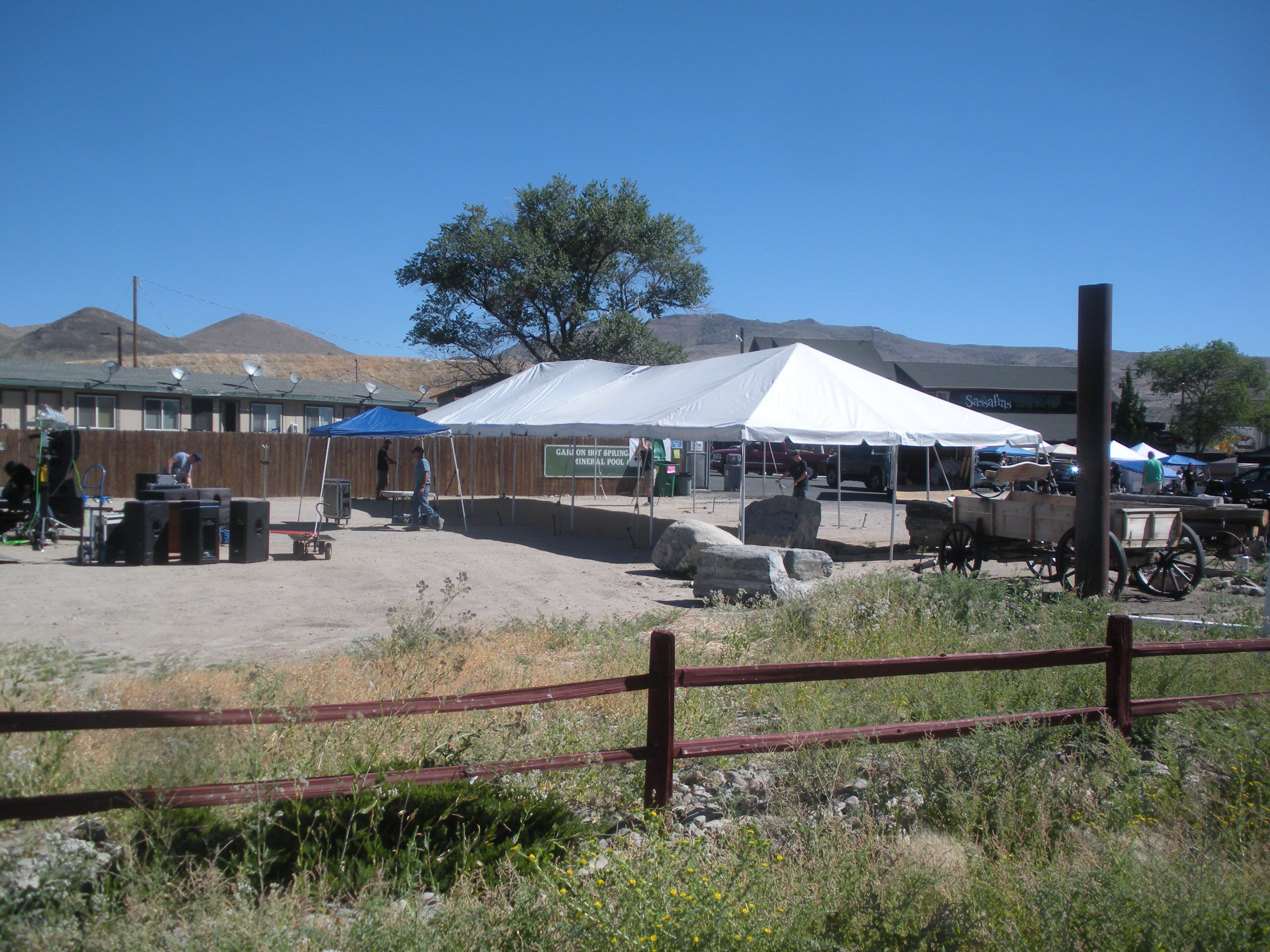
- The resort at Carson Hot Springs
- Interactive map of Carson Hot Springs
- Location: Carson City, Nevada, United States
- Type: Hot spring
- Provides water for: Soaking and swimming pools
- Discharge: 60 US gallons (230 L)
- Temperature: 120 °F (49 °C)

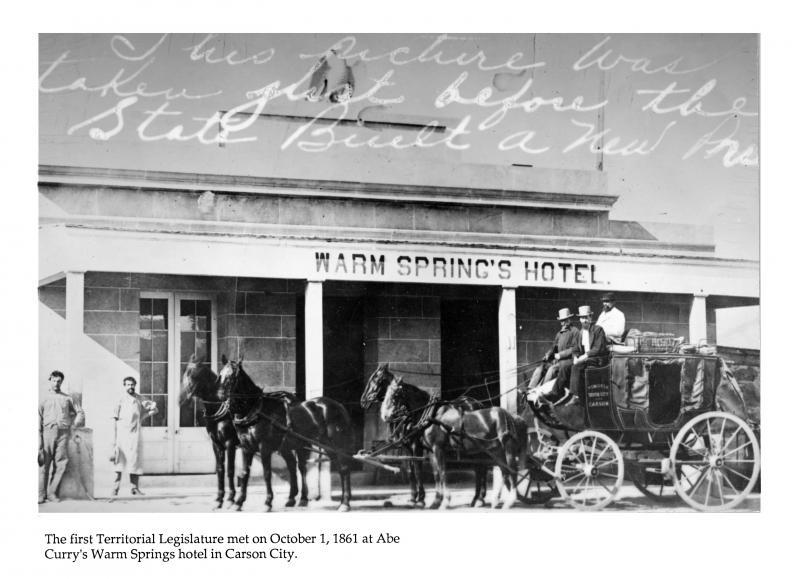
Curry's Warm Springs Hotel, Carson Hot Springs, Nevada in 1861

Carson Hot Springs is a natural hot spring located in Carson City, Nevada, in the Eagle Valley. The spring emits approximately 60 US gallons (230 L) of 120 °F (49 °C) geothermally heated groundwater per minute, and is the largest hot spring in the Eagle Valley. The groundwater originates at 6.6 miles (10.6 km) below the Earth's surface, and the pools at the site are filled with water pumped from the spring. Today, it is a resort that provides private indoor soaking areas, an outdoor swimming pool, massage and dining.

== History ==
The Carson Hot Springs were first used by Washoe Native Americans in the area. In 1849, immigrants to California during the California Gold Rush happened upon the springs.

In 1880, bathhouses and various accommodations such as dressing rooms, a swimming pool and diving board were built at the site. Weekly rates for room and board were provided at this time, at $10, $12 and $14, respectively ($10 is $ 300 in 2025). Around this time, a hotel was constructed next to the hot springs, and patrons were transported from Carson City to the site by horse and buggy. Circa 1872, the site was purchased from George Bath by Shubael Thaddeus Swift, the Sheriff of Ormsby County, who named it after himself. Another ownership change occurred in 1894 when James Shaw purchased the site and then renamed it to "Shaw's Warm Springs." The site was renamed to its present name in the early 1900s by a business group led by George Wingfield and Fred Dangberg. The business group expanded the property by constructing a club house, which was attended by big bands in the 1930s and 1940s.

Around 1910, the Carson Brewing Company began producing bottled mineral water sourced from Carson Hot Springs and bottled soft drinks.

Boxer "Gentleman Jim" Corbett trained at Carson Hot Springs in preparation for his 1897 boxing match with Robert Fitzsimmons.

== See also ==
- List of hot springs
- List of hot springs in the United States
