= Dat So La Lee =

Washoe basket maker from Nevada, U.S. (1829–1925)

Louisa Keyser, Dat So La Lee
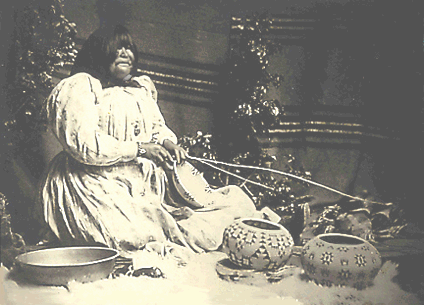
- Dat So La Lee in 1900
- Born: Dabuda; 1829 near Schurz, Nevada
- Died: December 6, 1925; Carson City, Nevada, United States
- Citizenship: Washoe Tribe
- Education: Self-taught
- Known for: Basket making
- Movement: baskery craze
- Patrons: Amy and Abram Cohn

Louisa Keyser, or Dat So La Lee (c. 1829 – December 6, 1925) was a celebrated Native American basket weaver. A member of the Washoe people in northwestern Nevada, her basketry came to national prominence during the Arts and Crafts movement and the "basket craze" of the early 20th century. Many museums of art and anthropology preserve and display her baskets, such as the Penn Museum in Philadelphia, the Smithsonian National Museum of the American Indian in Washington, D.C., the Nevada State Museum in Carson City, and the Metropolitan Museum of Art in New York.

== Meaning of name ==
Dat So La Lee was a nom d'art. There are several theories about the derivation of this name. One theory is that Dat So La Lee comes from the Washoe phrase Dats'ai-lo-lee meaning "Big Hips". Another, is that the name came from an employer with whom she worked. Her art dealers, the Cohns, described her birth name as being Dabuda, meaning "Young Willow".

== Documentation ==
Dat So La Lee met her future art dealers Amy and Abram Cohn around 1895. She was most likely hired by the couple as a laundress. They recognized the quality of Dat So La Lee's weaving and, wanting to enter the curio trade in Native American art, decided to promote and sell her basketry. Abram "Abe" Cohn owned the Emporium Company, a men's clothing store, in Carson City, Nevada.

Dat So La Lee baskets, 1940s photo

The couple began to document every basket she produced from 1895 to 1925. This expanded to include about 120 baskets that are documented. Most if not all of these documented baskets sold through the Cohn's Emporium, while the Cohns provided Keyser with food, lodging, and healthcare. The supreme craftsmanship of these baskets certainly added to the value, but the Cohns' early documentation promoted her artwork. Scholars have discovered that almost everything the Cohns wrote about Keyser was an exaggeration or fabrication.

In 1945, the State of Nevada purchased 20 Dat So La Lee baskets. Ten were placed in the collection of the Nevada Historical Society (NHS) in Reno, Nevada, and ten went to the Nevada State Museum in Carson City. With the collection came the ledgers documenting the baskets. In 1979, four of the baskets were stolen from the NHS, but by 1999 all had been recovered, and all ten were placed on permanent display. Four of the baskets were loaned to the Nevada Museum of Art for the exhibit "Tahoe, a Visual History (2015–2016).

According to artist and writer Amadour, the work of Louisa Keyser (Dat So La Lee) reflects a broader pattern in which Indigenous artists have been framed through settler narratives. Her baskets were first collected and exhibited as ethnographic objects but are now recognized as significant achievements in Indigenous art. Amadour places this shift within a wider critique of how the histories of Indigenous, Black, Asian, and Latinx communities in Nevada have been underrepresented, while dominant narratives of the American West continue to emphasize expansion and conquest. Stories about the 'West' are often told as tales of heroic conquest and Manifest destiny, which can hide the real experiences of those who lived there.

== Craftsmanship ==
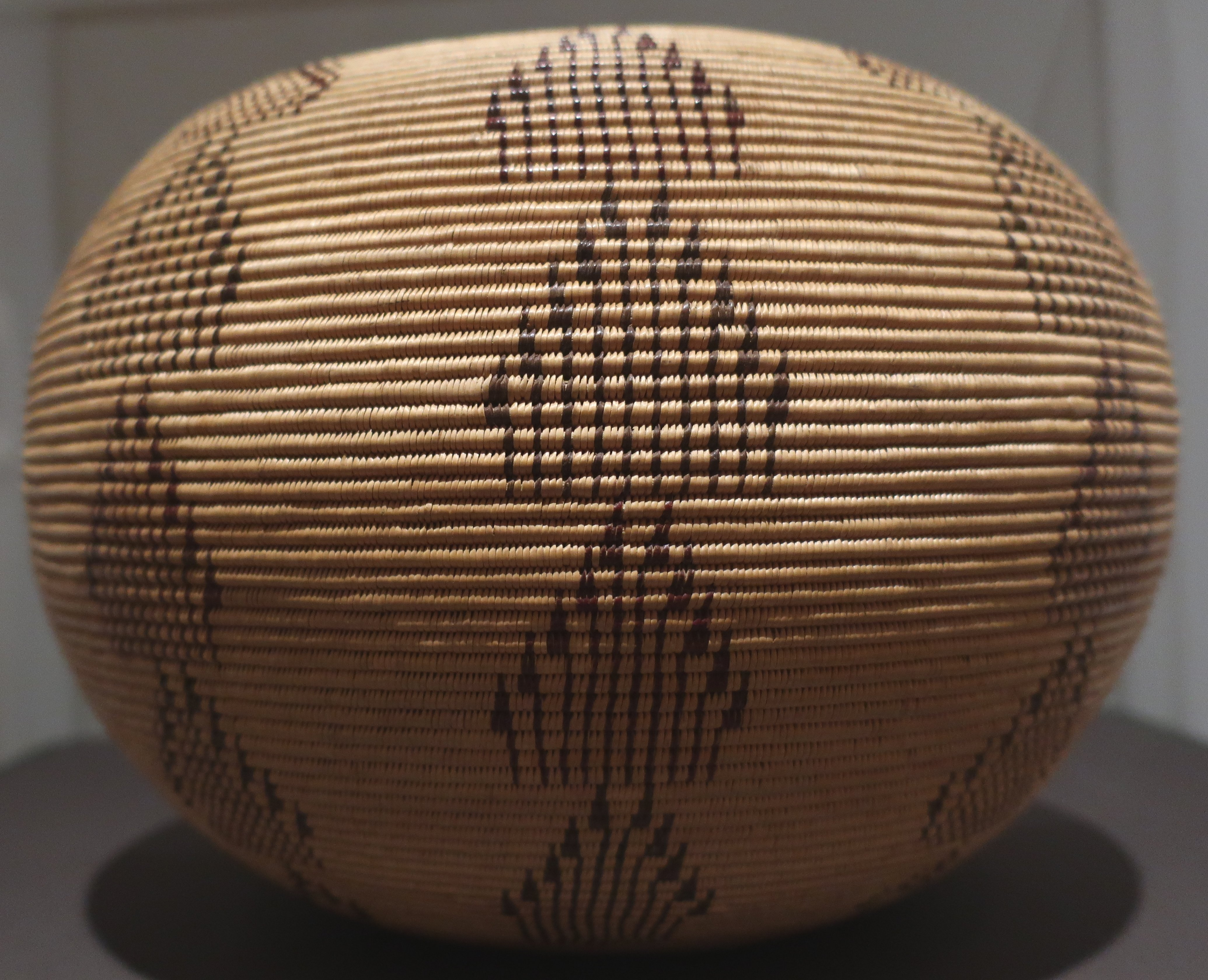
Bakset made by Dat So La Lee with willow, braken fern, and redbud, 1900

Dat So La Lee primarily used willow in the construction of her basketry. She would usually start out with three rods of willow and then weave strands around that. Her predominate style was a flat base, expanding out into its maximum circumference and tapering back to a hole in the top around the same size as the base. This is the degikup style that she popularized with Washoe basket weavers.

Five of Dat So La Lee's baskets were included in the 2023 Independent 20th Century Art Fair in New York City. The five include a basket titled "Brotherhood of Men" which sold for $1.2 million in 2007, and a 1916 basket titled "Myriads of Stars Shine Over Our Dead Ancestors" that Dat So La Lee considered as her best work.

== Death, resting place, and legacy ==
Dat So La Lee is buried in the Stewart Cemetery on Snyder Avenue in Carson City, Nevada. Though very much surrounded by diverse cultures because of the recognition of her work, she only allowed a Woodfords medicine man named Tom Walker treat her and prepare her for death. On December 2, 1925, they began a four-day ritual to help her complete her days so that she could pass on to death. She died on December 6, 1925.

Her simple marble grave marker reads "Dat So La Lee / Famous Washoe Basket Maker / Died 12. 6. 25." A nearby Nevada state historic marker reads, "Myriads of stars shine over the graves of our ancestors."

Dat So La Lee Post #12 of the American Legion in Reno, NV is named for her.

== See also ==
- Dat So La Lee House, Carson City
- Native American basket weavers
- Sarah Jim Mayo
