= Reese–Johnson–Virgin House =

Historic house in Nevada, United States

- U.S. National Register of Historic Places
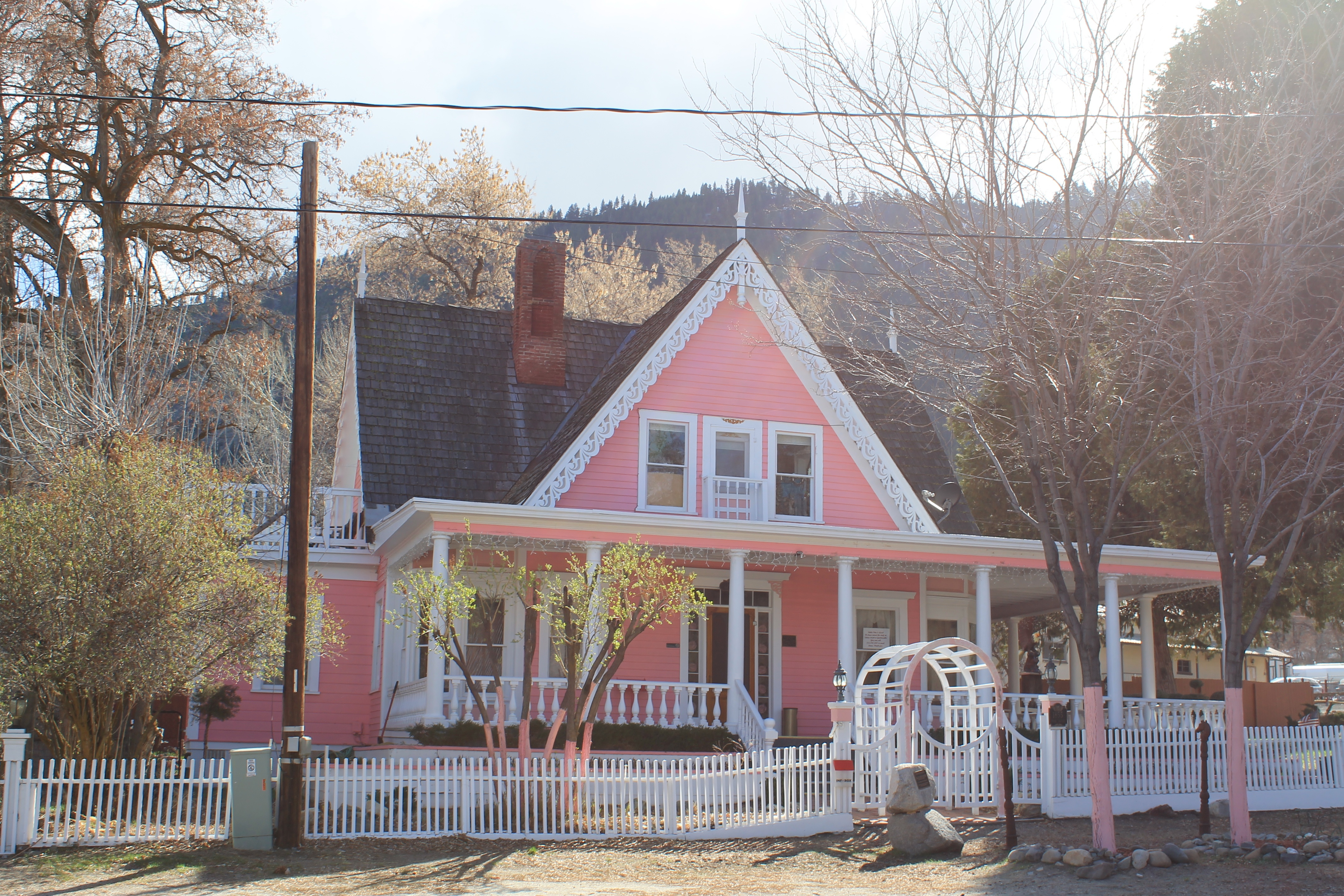
- House in 2013

- Location within Nevada Location within the United States
- Location: 193 Genoa Ln., Genoa, Nevada
- Coordinates: 39°0′12″N 119°50′40″W
- Area: 0.4 acres (0.16 ha)
- Built: 1855
- Built by: Gaige, Martin
- Architectural style: Gothic Revival
- NRHP reference No.: 04000728
- Added to NRHP: July 21, 2004

The Reese–Johnson–Virgin House is a historic Gothic Revival-style house at 193 Genoa Ln. in Genoa, Nevada. Also known as The Pink House, it was listed on the National Register of Historic Places in 2004.

Deemed significant for its role in Genoa's history, it was built in approximately 1855 in carpenter Gothic style by carpenter Mark Gaige for John Reese, then later bought and moved (in 1870) by merchant J.R. Johnson, who painted it pink. It was later owned by judge D.W. Virgin. It has decorative bargeboards under its eaves and is topped by finials and other ornamentation.

The house's architecture — both original and later modifications — demonstrates historical trends in the community, depicting the growing prosperity both of its owners and of the community.

It is individually listed on the National Register in 2004, and also was included as a contributing building in the Genoa Historic District, NRHP-listed in 1975.

== See also ==
- List of the oldest buildings in Nevada
