= List of the oldest buildings in Nevada =

This article lists the oldest extant buildings in Nevada, including extant buildings and structures constructed prior to and during the United States rule over Nevada. Only buildings built prior to 1870 are suitable for inclusion on this list, or the building must be the oldest of its type.

In order to qualify for the list, a structure must:

- be a recognizable building (defined as any human-made structure used or intended for supporting or sheltering any use or continuous occupancy);
- incorporate features of building work from the claimed date to at least 1.5 metres (4.9 ft) in height and/or be a listed building.

This consciously excludes ruins of limited height, roads and statues. Bridges may be included if they otherwise fulfill the above criteria. Dates for many of the oldest structures have been arrived at by radiocarbon dating or dendrochronology and should be considered approximate. If the exact year of initial construction is estimated, it will be shown as a range of dates.

== List of oldest buildings ==
Building	Image	Location	First built	Use	Notes
Old Las Vegas Mormon Fort State Historic Park		Las Vegas, Nevada	1855	Fort	Oldest building in Nevada
Reese–Johnson–Virgin House (aka Pink House)		Genoa, Nevada	ca. 1855	Residence	Oldest house in Genoa; Also known as the Pink House; it is a Gothic Revival style structure.
Stewart-Nye House		Carson City, Nevada	1860	Residence	Oldest house in Carson, City; Located on Minnesota Street between King and Musser. Home to Senator William Stewart originally, then Gov. James W. Nye, and now a law office.
Fort Churchill		Silver Springs, Nevada	ca. 1860	Military	Ruins of Fort Churchill.
314 S. Carson St		Carson City, Nevada	1861	Residence	Oldest commercial building in Carson, City; Located 314 S. Carson St, and now a Hooka lounge next door to Comma Coffee.
Foreman-Roberts House		Washoe Valley, Nevada/Carson City	1863	Residence	Built in Washoe Valley, Nevada and later moved by owner to Carson City; now the home of Carson City Historical Society. Built in a Gothic Revival and Carpenter Gothic style.
Brewery Arts Center		Carson City, Nevada	1862	Commercial	
Orion Clemens House		Carson City, Nevada	1864	Residence	Home of Mark Twain and his brother Orion.
First Presbyterian Church		Carson City, Nevada	1864	Church	Oldest church building in Carson City
First Methodist Church		Carson City, Nevada	1865	Church	
Sweeney Building		Carson City, Nevada	1865	Commercial	

== See also ==
- National Register of Historic Places listings in Nevada
- History of Nevada
- Oldest buildings in the United States
