= Gov. Reinhold Sadler House =

Historic house in Nevada, United States

- U.S. National Register of Historic Places
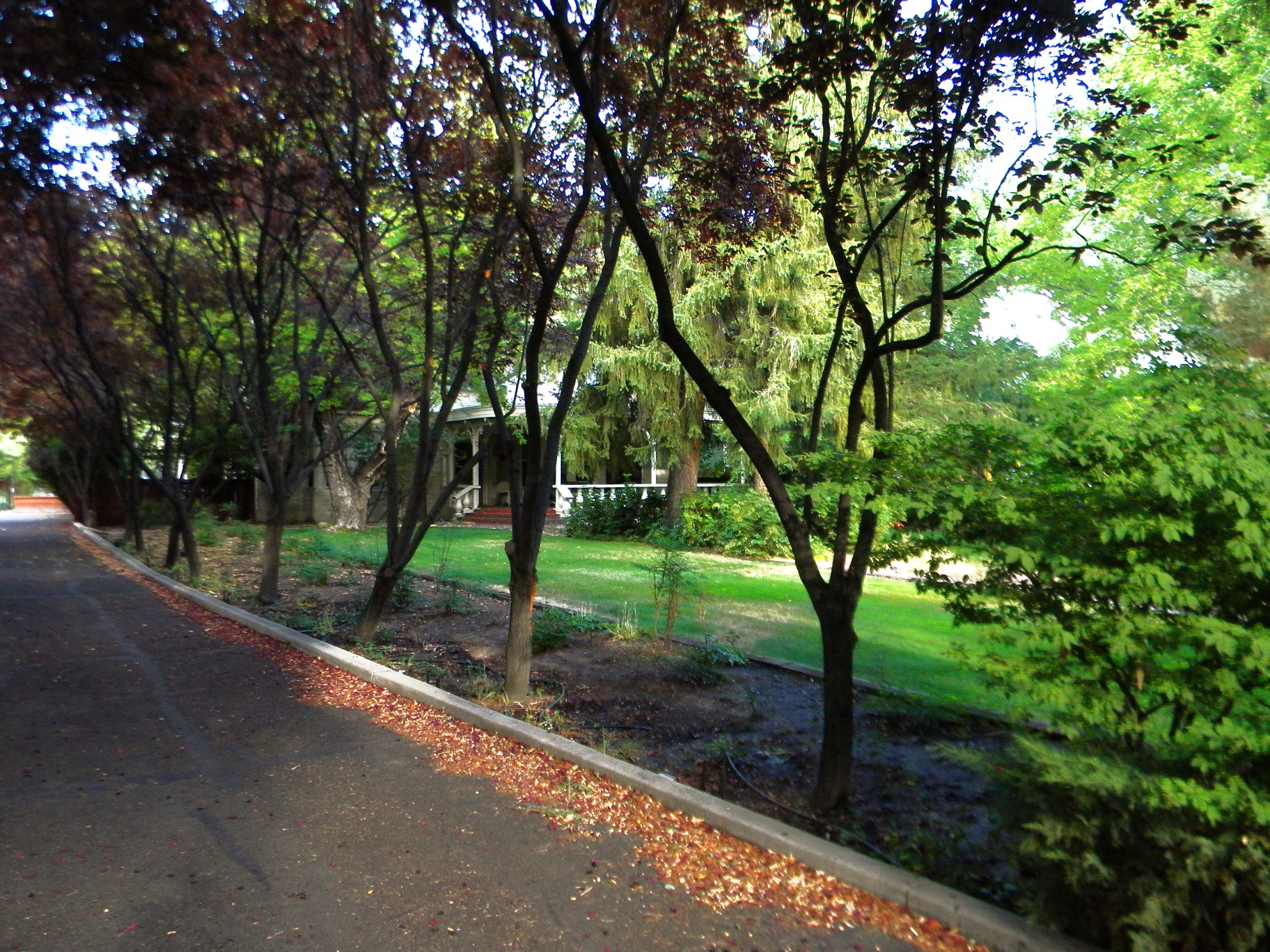

- Location within Nevada Location within the United States
- Location: 310 Mountain St., Carson City, Nevada
- Coordinates: 39°9′55″N 119°46′20″W
- Area: less than one acre
- Built: 1877
- Built by: Niles, Ed
- NRHP reference No.: 79003436
- Added to NRHP: March 2, 1979

The Gov. Reinhold Sadler House, at 310 Mountain St. in Carson City, Nevada, United States, was built in 1877. It was a work of builder Ed Niles. It was a home of Nevada governor Reinhold Sadler (1848–1906). It was listed on the National Register of Historic Places in 1979.

It was deemed significant as "a tangible reminder of Governor Reinhold Sadler", who served as Lieutenant Governor during 1896-98 and as Governor during 1899–1902. Sadler had purchased the house in 1896. According to its NRHP nomination, there's "no architectural significance attached to the house, although the present owners have performed a skillful restoration to bring back interesting architectural details."
