= Second Railroad Car No. 21 =

- U.S. National Register of Historic Places
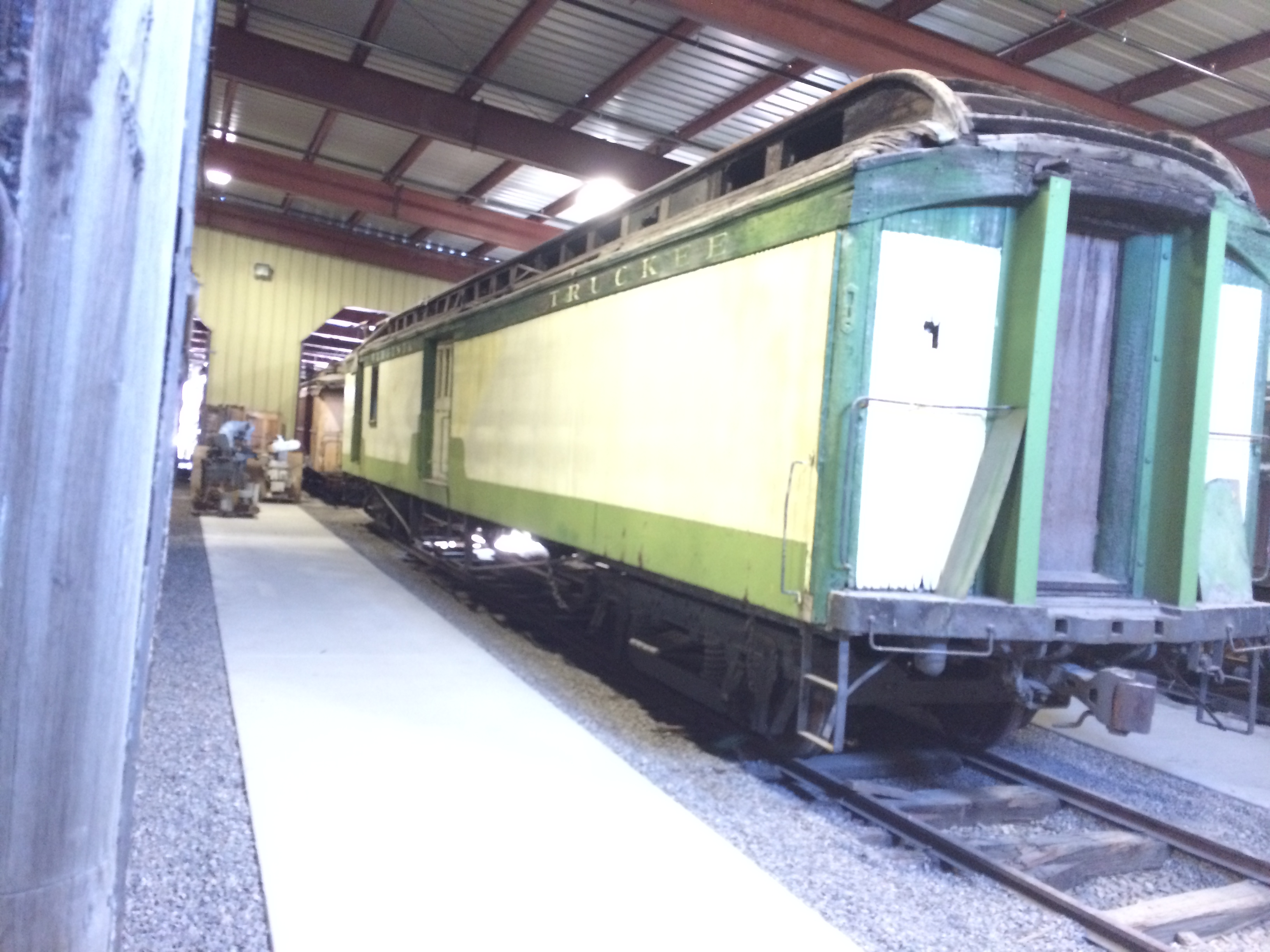

- Location within Nevada Location within the United States
- Location: Nevada State Railroad Museum, located at 2180 S. Carson St., Carson City, Nevada
- Coordinates: 39°8′51″N 119°46′6″W
- Area: less than one acre
- Built: 1907
- Built by: American Car & Foundry
- Architectural style: Railway Post Office
- NRHP reference No.: 78003214
- Added to NRHP: December 1, 1978

The Second Railroad Car No. 21, at the Nevada State Railroad Museum, located at 2180 S. Carson St. in Carson City, Nevada is a historic railroad car of the Virginia & Truckee line that was built in 1907. It was built by the American Car & Foundry. It was listed on the National Register of Historic Places in 1978.
