= Lakeview House =

Historic house in Nevada, United States

- U.S. National Register of Historic Places
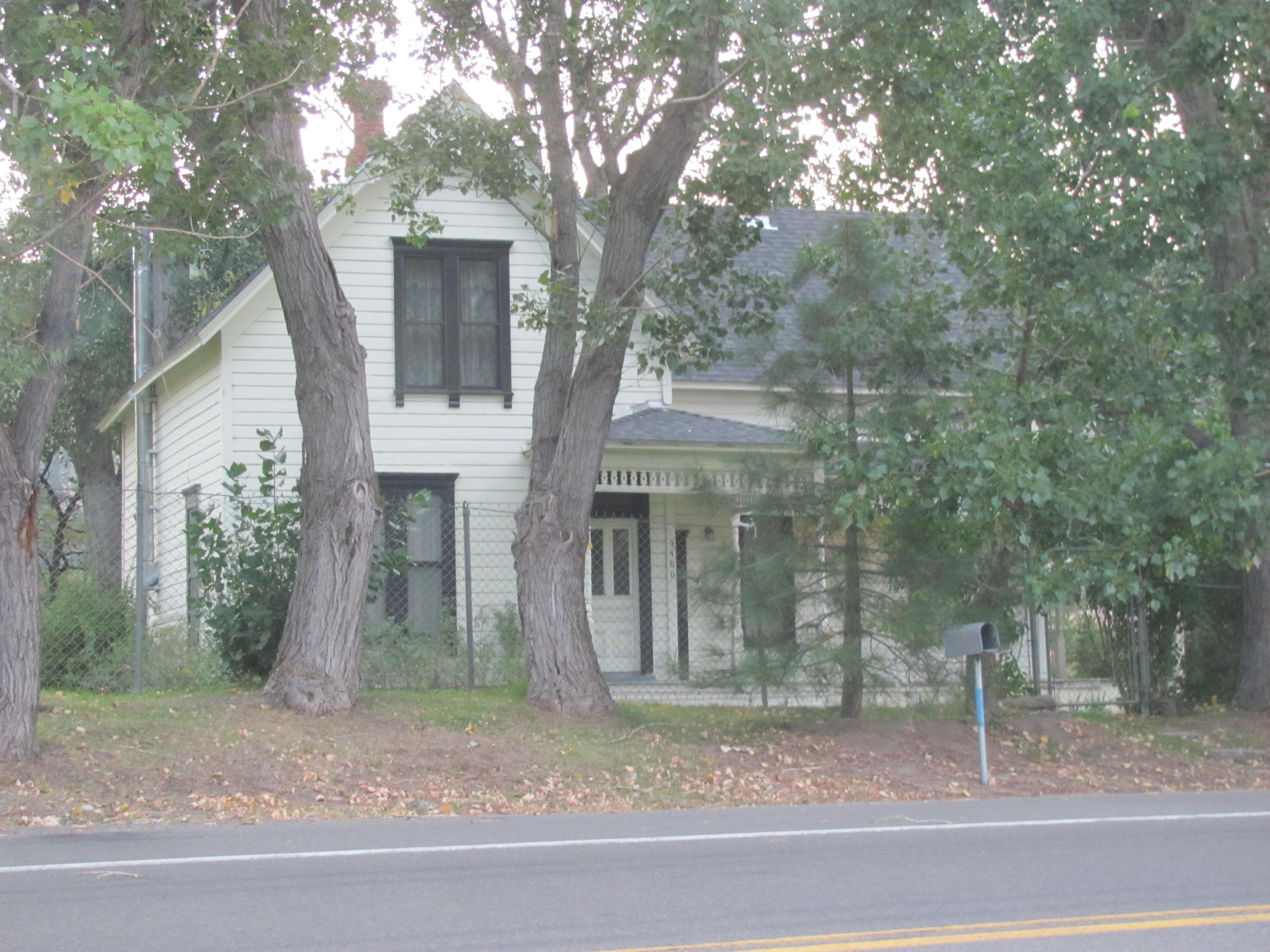
- 2012 photo

- Location within Nevada Location within the United States
- Location: U.S. 395 south of E. Lake Blvd., Carson City, Nevada
- Coordinates: 39°12′29″N 119°48′13″W
- Area: 3.1 acres (1.3 ha)
- Built: 1873
- Built by: Virginia City & Gold Hill Water Co.
- NRHP reference No.: 78003211
- Added to NRHP: January 5, 1978

Nevada State Historic Preservation Office PDF documents The Lakeview House is a historic house overlooking Washoe Lake in Carson City, Nevada, that was built in 1873. It was listed on the National Register of Historic Places in 1978.

This home is on U.S. Route 395 south of E. Lake Blvd. It was deemed significant for association with "early-day recreation, transportation, lumbering, and water-supply enterprises." It was built on the site of an inn that had burned in 1871. It was the headquarters of John B. Overton, supervisor of the Virginia City & Gold Hill Water Company, which built a water pipe through the area. The area was the end of a nine-mile-long (14 km) lumber flume that brought timber used in Comstock Lode mines and was loaded there onto the Virginia & Truckee Railroad. The V&T ran right behind the house, essentially in the backyard. The house is near the underground large pipe that runs down from Marlette Lake through the same pipe up to Virginia City. This water pipe was an engineering marvel for its day, using only the water pressure flow from Marlette Lake. The water pressure alone forced the water back up to Virginia City. This water pipe from Marlette Lake continues to provide Virginia City fresh water. The house was later home of several succeeding supervisors and watermasters. The house is about four miles (6.4 km) northwest of downtown Carson City.
