= Dat So La Lee House =

Historic house in Nevada, United States

- U.S. National Register of Historic Places
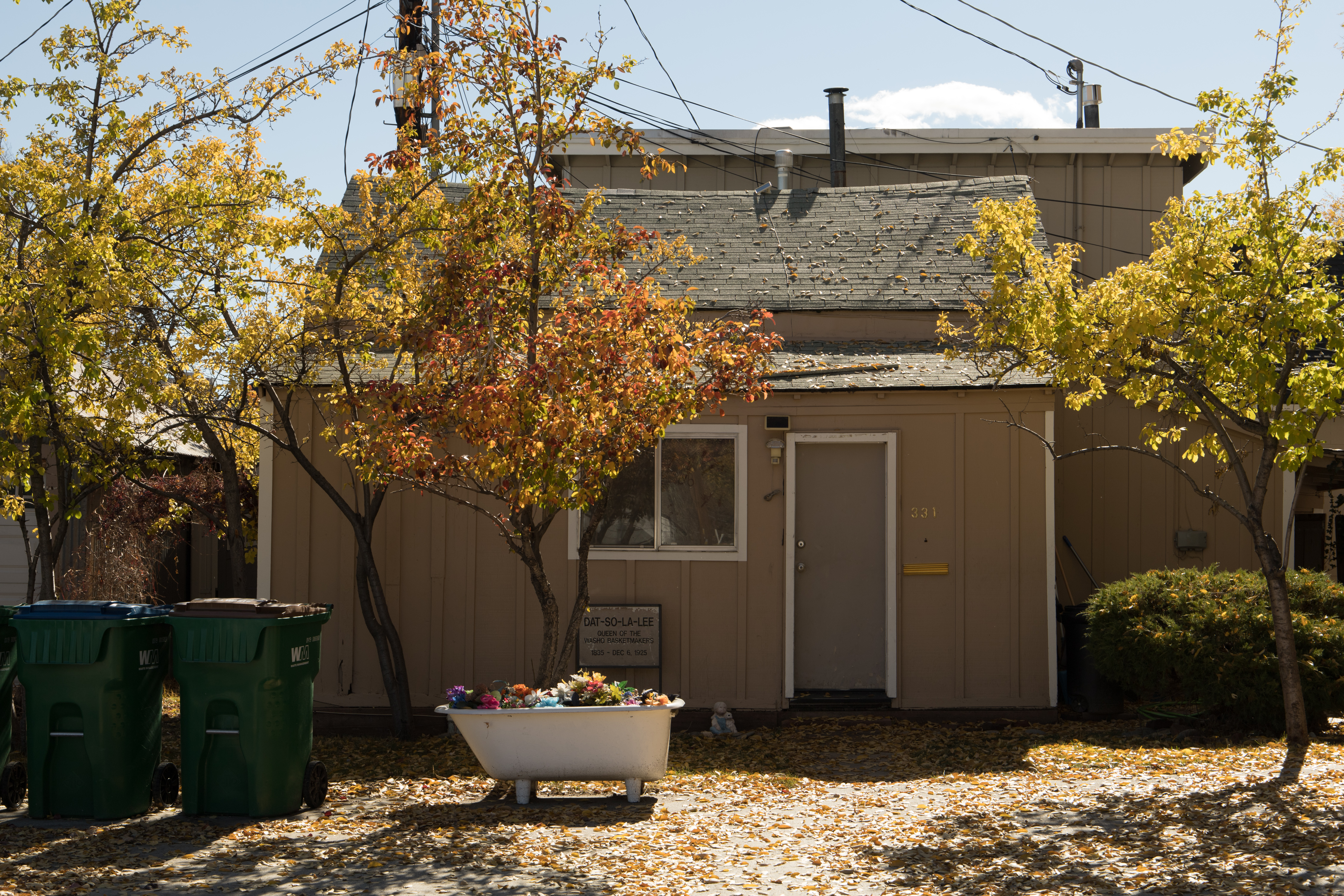

- Location within Nevada Location within the United States
- Location: 331 W. Proctor St., Carson City, Nevada
- Coordinates: 39°9′55″N 119°46′3″W
- Area: less than one acre
- Built: c.1914
- Built by: Cohn, Abram
- Architectural style: Late 19th and Early 20th Century American Movements, board and batten
- NRHP reference No.: 94000553
- Added to NRHP: June 6, 1994

The Dat So La Lee House, which is located at 331 W. Proctor St. in Carson City, Nevada, is a historic house that is listed on the National Register of Historic Places. It was a home of Dat So La Lee (ca. 1845/1855–1925), a woman who also was known as Louisa Keyser, who was a well-known Washoe Indian basket weaver. The house, also known as the Louisa Keyser House, was listed on the National Register in 1994.

The house is a modest one-story board and batten cottage built by Abram Cohn, husband of Clarrise Amy Cohn, who was Louisa's promoter. At time of NRHP listing, the house was still a residence. It faces north onto West Proctor Street, but is set back about 40 feet behind a small lawn and parking area.
