= Foreman–Roberts House =

Historic house in Nevada, United States

- U.S. National Register of Historic Places
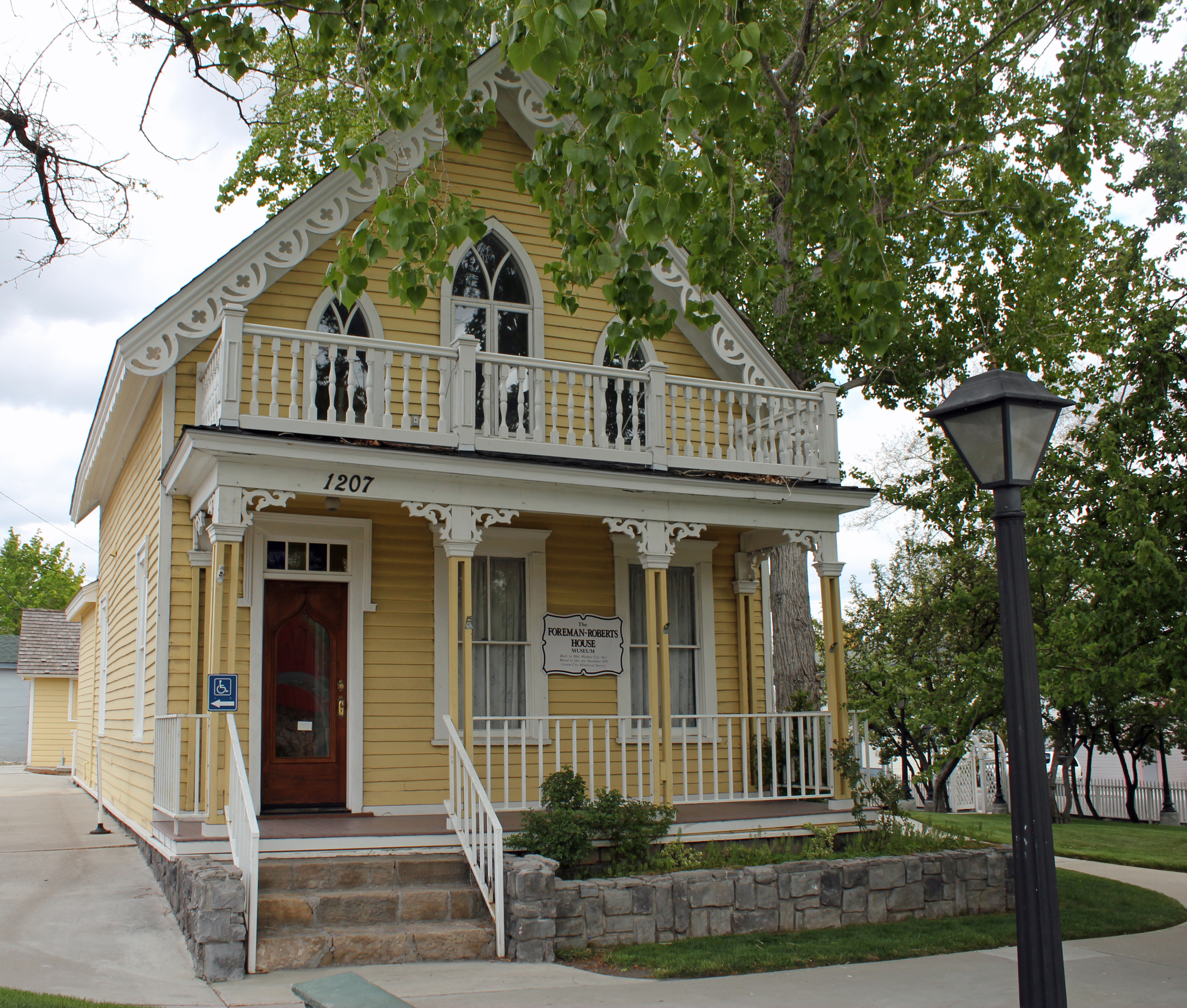
- 2011 photo

- Location within Nevada Location within the United States
- Location: 1217 N. Carson St., Carson City, Nevada
- Coordinates: 39°10′19″N 119°45′57″W
- Area: 0.4 acres (0.16 ha)
- Built: 1859
- Architectural style: Gothic Revival, Carpenter Gothic
- NRHP reference No.: 78003213
- Added to NRHP: January 3, 1978

The Foreman–Roberts House, formerly the James D. Roberts House and now also known as the Foreman–Roberts House Museum, is a historic house and museum located at 1217 N. Carson St. in Carson City, Nevada. The house was built in 1859 and was moved to the present location in 1873. Known also as the Thurman Roberts House for the last member of the Roberts family, it is listed on the National Register of Historic Places. It is the headquarters of the Carson City Historical Society and is open to the public by appointment and for special events.

The house was listed on the National Register of Historic Places in 1978. It is significant "as a rare example of the Gothic Revival Style of architecture", being the only surviving example in Carson City and one of few in Nevada. It is also the oldest surviving house in Carson City.

The house was documented by drawings in the Historic American Buildings Survey program in 1973.

== See also ==
- List of the oldest buildings in Nevada
