= Curry Hill Plantation =

American plantation

- U.S. National Register of Historic Places
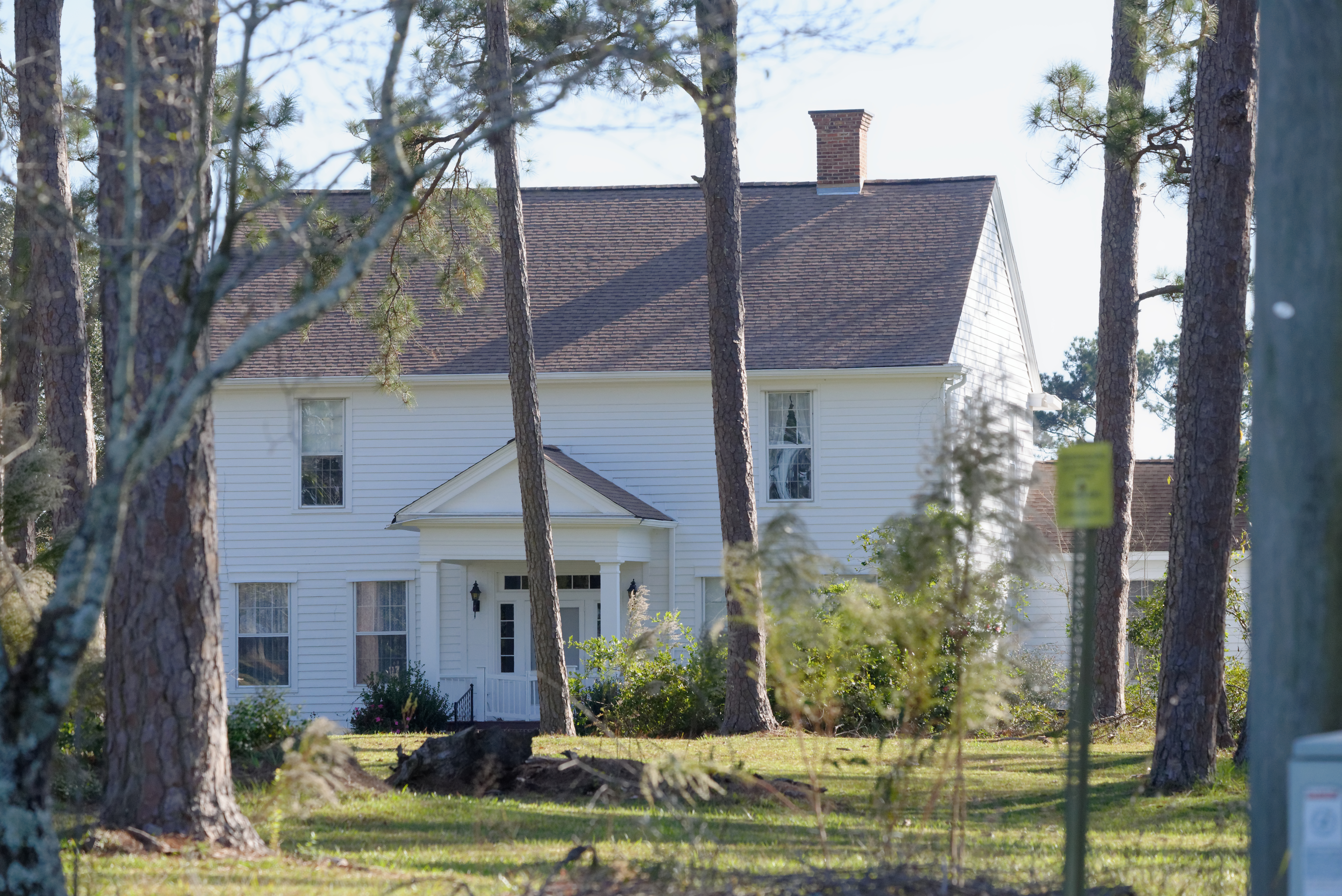

- Location within Georgia Location within the United States
- Location: 6 mi. E of Bainbridge on U.S. 84, Georgia
- Coordinates: 30°52′58″N 84°27′57″W
- Area: 400 acres (160 ha)
- Built: c.1850
- Built by: Duncan Curry, Jr.
- Architectural style: Plantation Plain
- NRHP reference No.: 73000620
- Added to NRHP: January 29, 1973

The Curry Hill Plantation near Bainbridge, Georgia is a plantation begun in 1842 by Duncan Curry. It was several thousand acres in size, and was a stage coach stop on the stage coach line between Thomasville and Bainbridge. The Curry family lived in a log house at first, then in the 1850s lived in the former stage coach house while the main plantation house which stands today was built. The main house was built in the 1850s and includes Greek Revival elements.

The remaining property is 400 acres (160 ha) in size.

It was listed on the National Register of Historic Places in 1973.
