= George L. Sanford House =

Historic house in Nevada, United States

- U.S. National Register of Historic Places
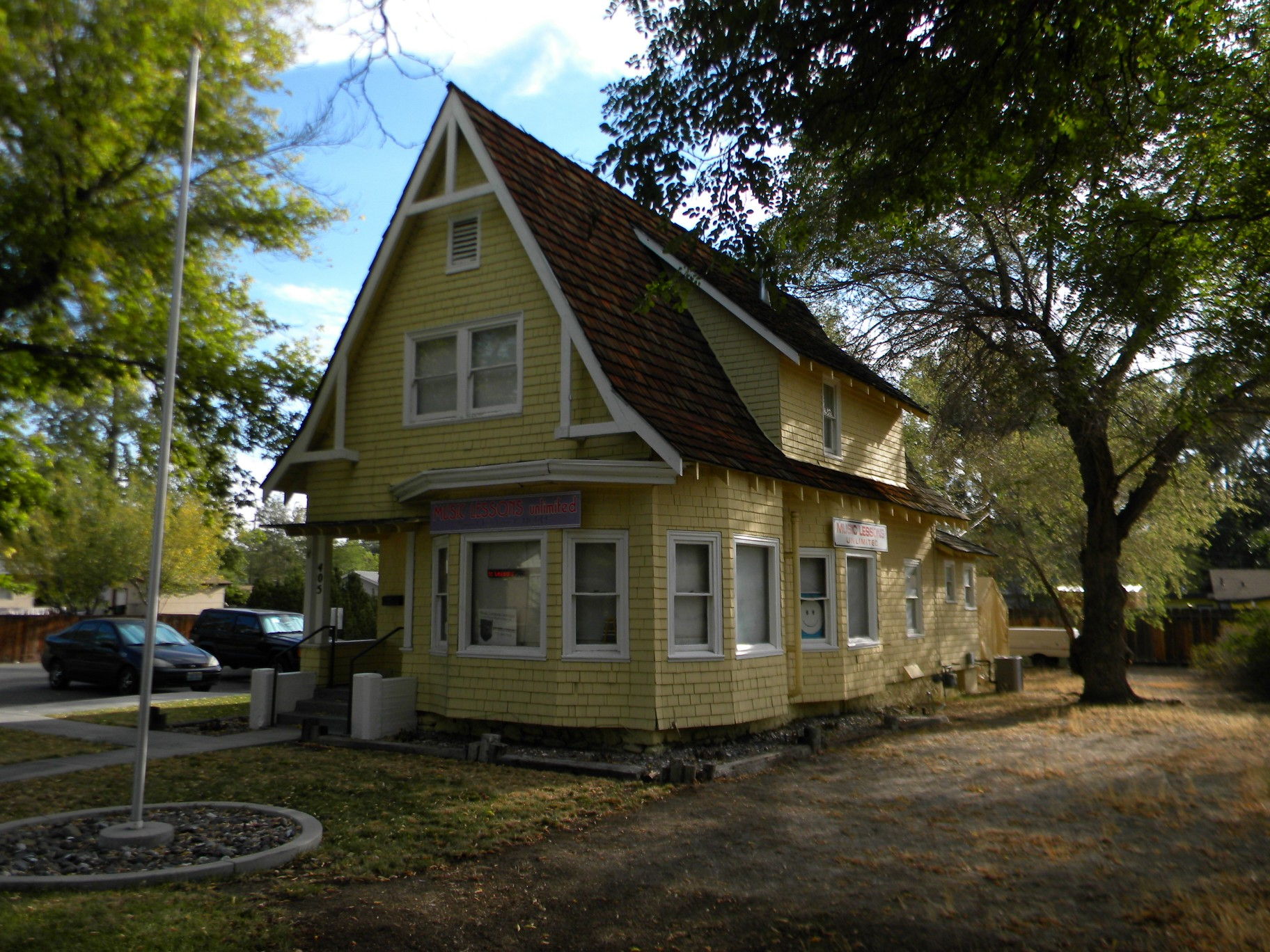

- Location within Nevada Location within the United States
- Location: 405 N. Roop St., Carson City, Nevada
- Coordinates: 39°10′3″N 119°42′47″W
- Area: less than one acre
- Built: c.1910
- Built by: Sanford, George L.
- Architectural style: Bungalow/craftsman, Stick/Eastlake, Second Empire
- NRHP reference No.: 94001472
- Added to NRHP: December 19, 1994

The George L. Sanford House, at 405 N. Roop St. in Carson City, Nevada, United States, was built in c.1910. It includes Bungalow/craftsman, Stick/Eastlake, and Second Empire architecture. It was listed on the National Register of Historic Places in 1994; the listing included two contributing buildings.

George L. Sanford came to Nevada in about 1906, and was experienced in law and in the newspaper industry; he came to control the Carson City News newspaper. It was deemed significant as the sole surviving buildings associated with the "powerful" Sanford family (including George's brothers Graham and Leigh) and also for its architecture.
