= Gov. James W. Nye Mansion =

Historic house in Nevada, United States

- U.S. National Register of Historic Places
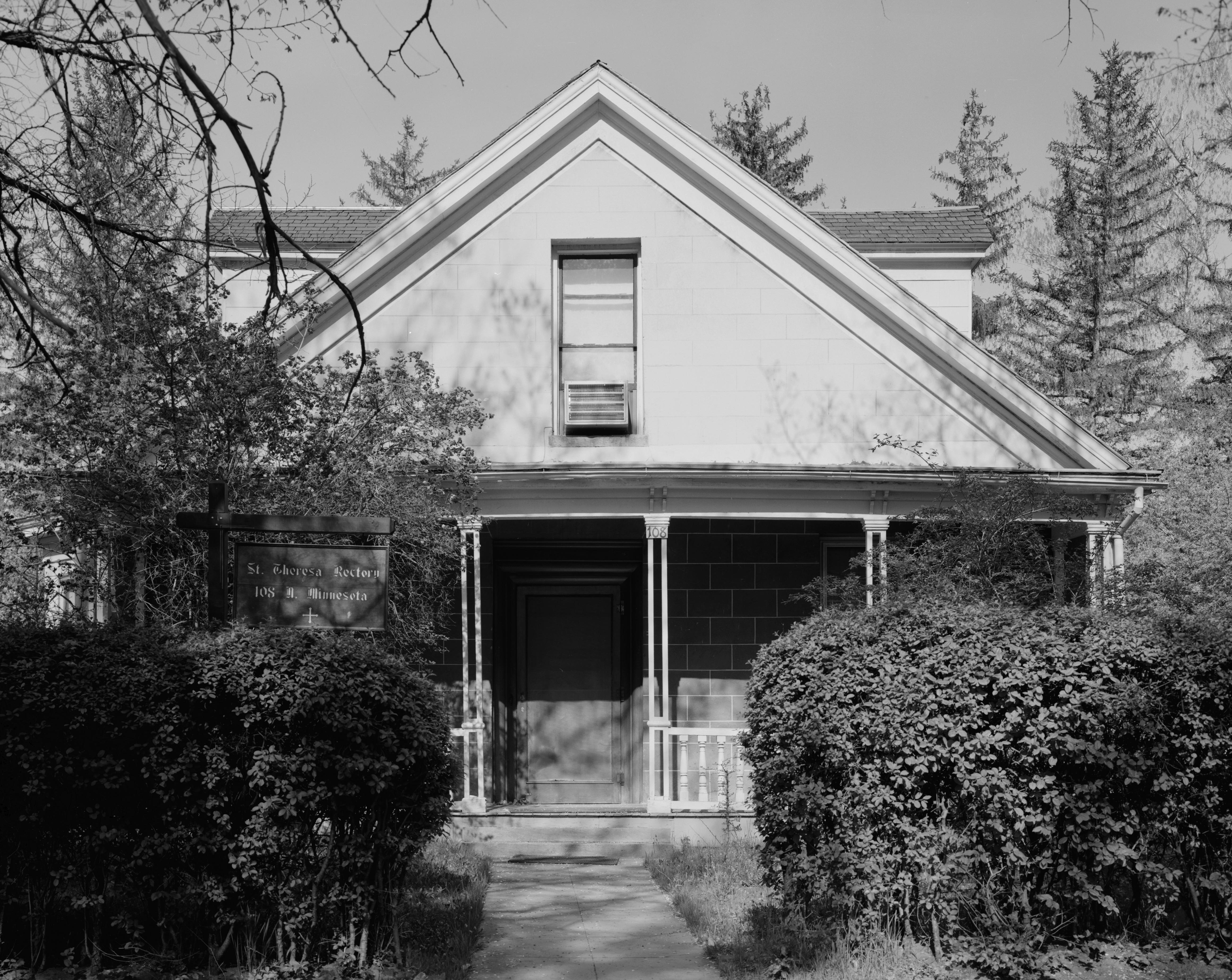

- Location within Nevada Location within the United States
- Location: 108 N. Minnesota St., Carson City, Nevada
- Coordinates: 39°9′52″N 119°46′11″W
- Area: 1 acre (0.40 ha)
- Built: 1860
- NRHP reference No.: 75002128
- Added to NRHP: April 16, 1975

The Gov. James W. Nye Mansion, at 108 N. Minnesota St. in Carson City, Nevada, United States, was built in 1860. It has also been known as St. Teresa's Rectory. It was a home of U.S. senator William M. Stewart and of Nevada territory governor James W. Nye.

It is a 1 1/2-story stone house built on a large lot. It became an unofficial Governor's Mansion after Governor Nye purchased the house in 1862.

== See also ==
- List of the oldest buildings in Nevada
