= Kitzmeyer Furniture Factory =

- U.S. National Register of Historic Places
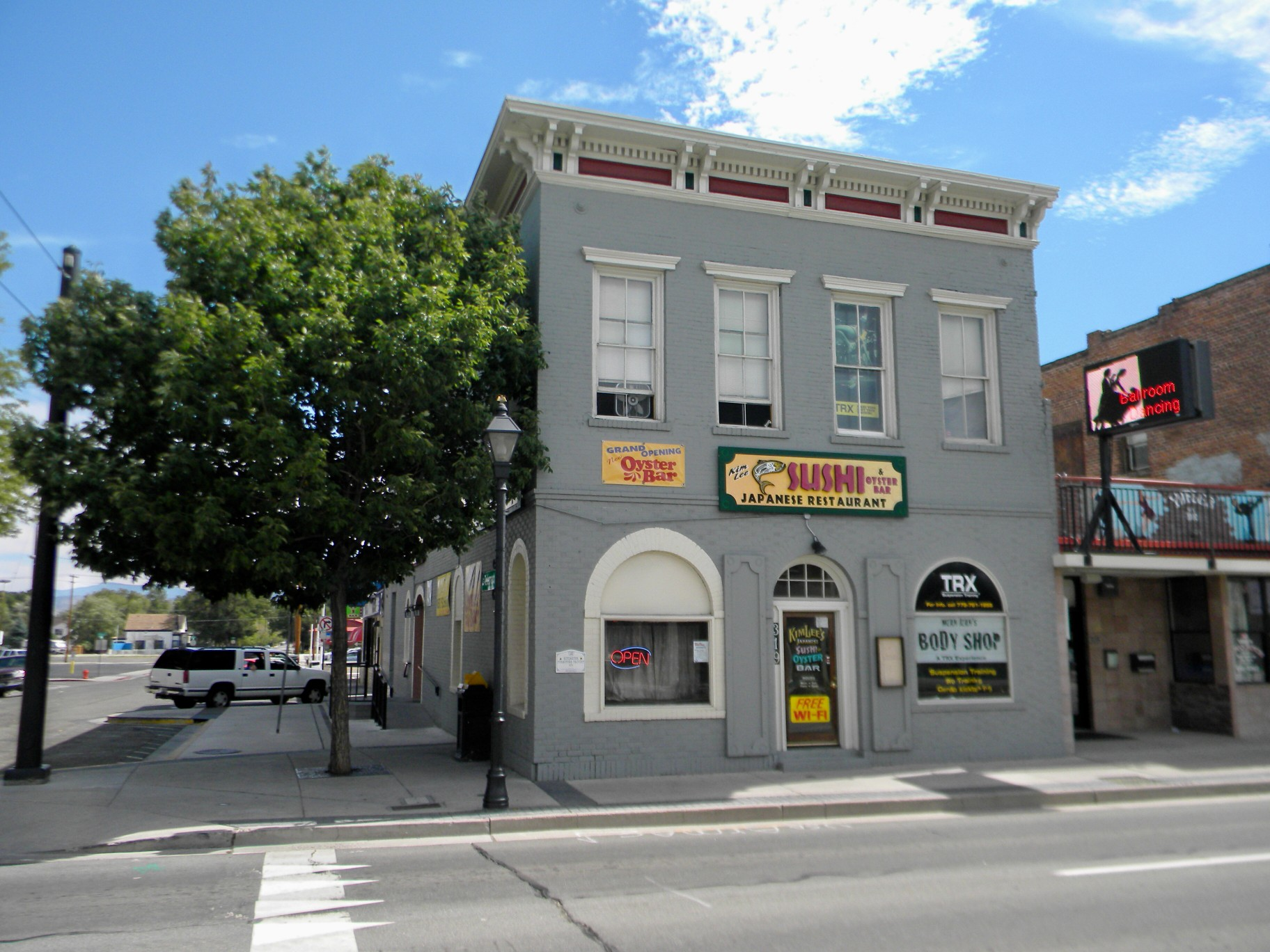

- Location within Nevada Location within the United States
- Location: 319 N. Carson St., Carson City, Nevada
- Coordinates: 39°9′58″N 119°45′15″W
- Area: 0 acres (0 ha)
- Built: 1873
- Architectural style: Italianate
- NRHP reference No.: 87000714
- Added to NRHP: June 22, 1987

The Kitzmeyer Furniture Factory, at 319 N. Carson St. in Carson City, Nevada, is a historic building built in 1873. It is the oldest surviving Italianate-style commercial buildings in the commercial core area of Carson City.

It was built to provide a furniture showroom on the ground floor and furniture factory space above, and served in this way until 1901. It was listed on the National Register of Historic Places in 1987.
