= David Smaill House =

Historic house in Nevada, United States

- U.S. National Register of Historic Places
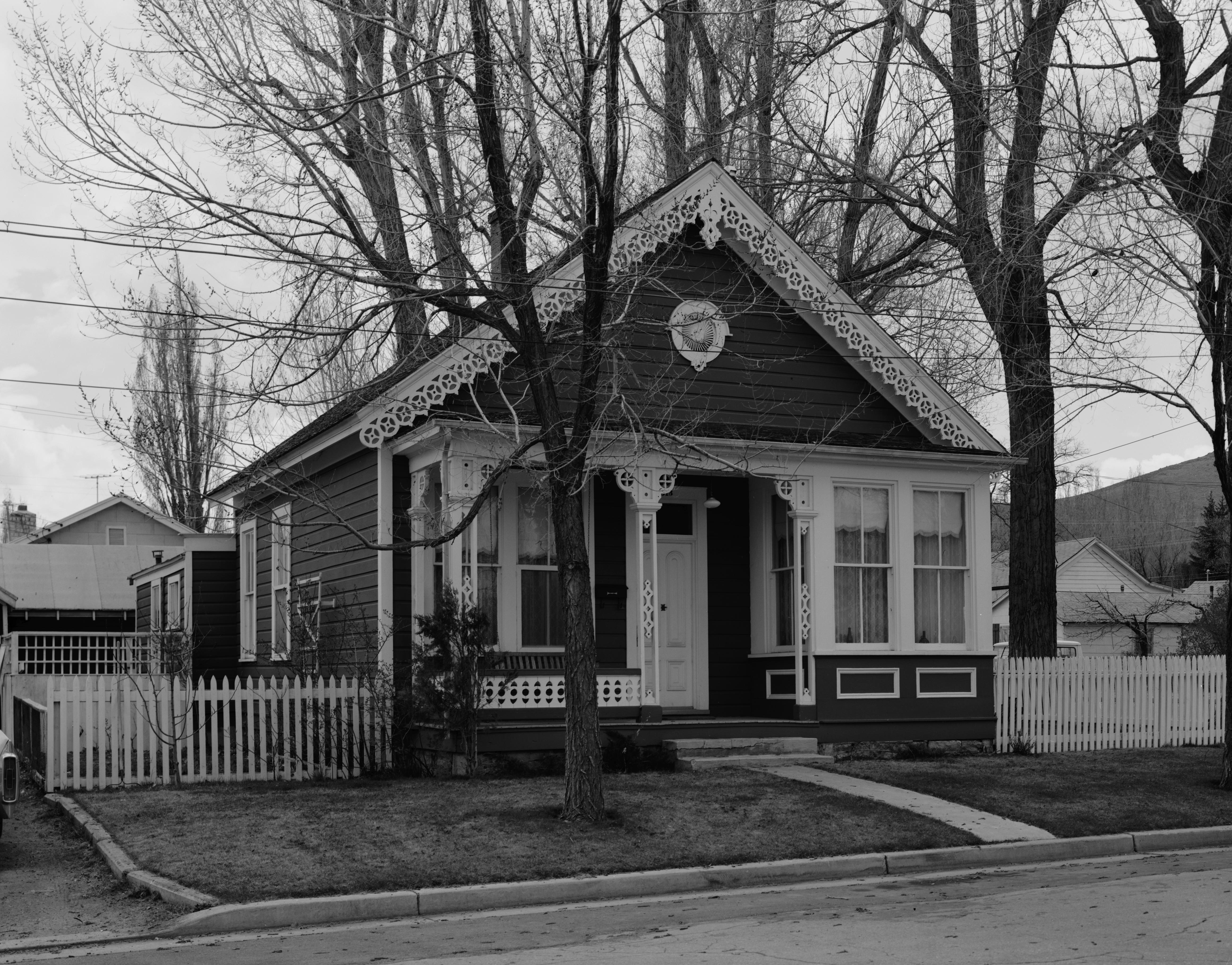

- Location within Nevada Location within the United States
- Location: 313 W. Ann St., Carson City, Nevada
- Coordinates: 39°10′16″N 119°46′6″W
- Area: less than one acre
- Built: c.1876
- Built by: Smaill, David
- Architectural style: Gothic, Stick/eastlake, Vernacular Victorian/Eastlk.
- NRHP reference No.: 85002408
- Added to NRHP: September 16, 1985

The David Smaill House, at 313 W. Ann St. in Carson City, Nevada, was built in c.1876. Also known as the Smaill House, it was listed on the National Register of Historic Places in 1985.

It was deemed significant "for its associations with the early residential development of Carson City, Nevada", according to its NRHP nomination, which went on to note: "The dwelling is representative of the small, vernacular dwellings associated with Carson City's working class in the late 19th century. The building is architecturally noteworthy for its simplicity of design and elaborate exterior ornamentation." The original house was built by Smaill at least partway during 1876 and then sold by Smaill in 1877, though David and Rachel Spratte Smaill lived there up to 1879 at least.
