= West Side Historic District (Carson City, Nevada) =

Historic district in Nevada, United States

- U.S. National Register of Historic Places
- U.S. Historic district
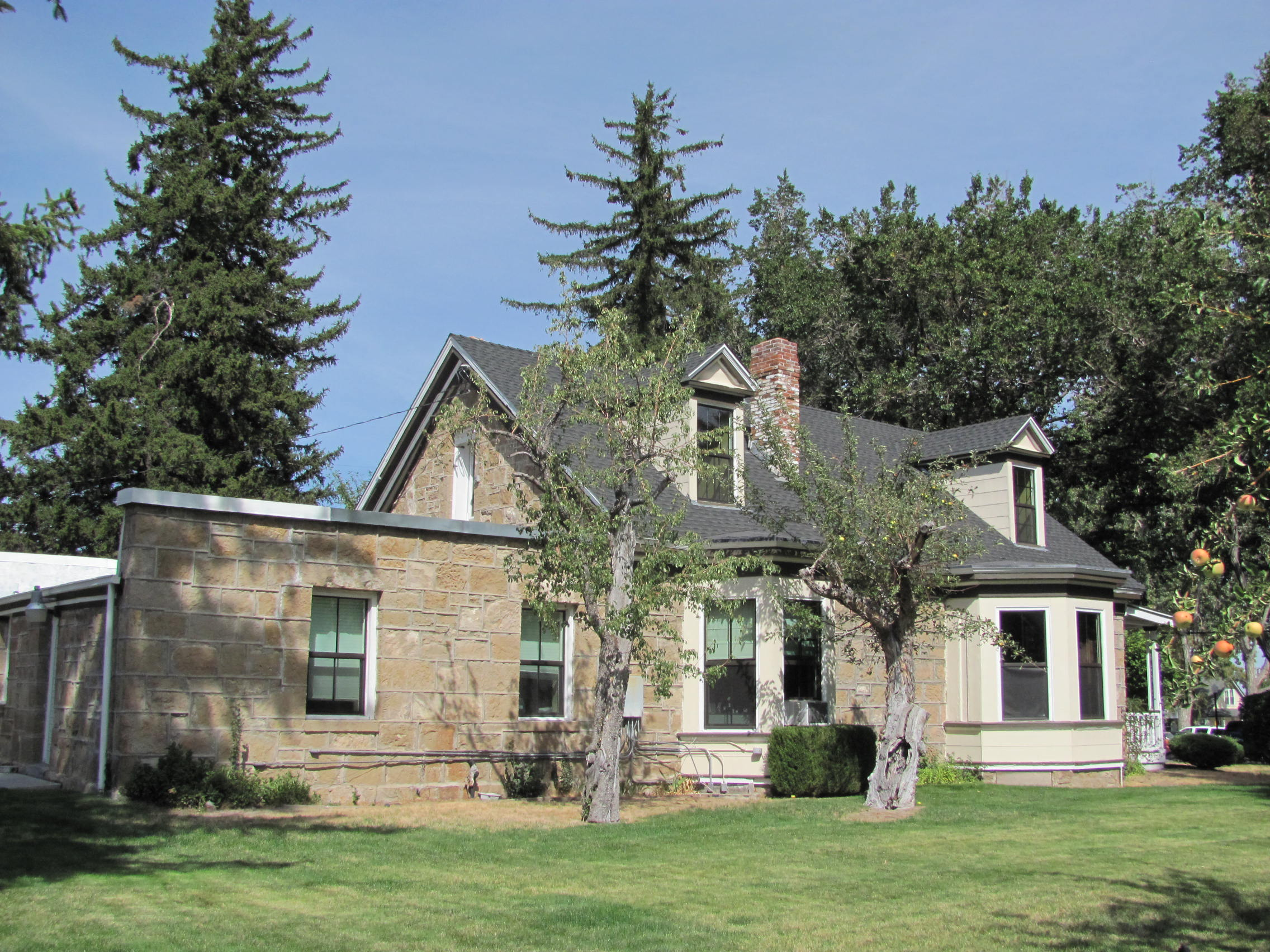

- Location within Nevada Location within the United States
- Location: Roughly bounded by Curry, Mountain, 5th & John Sts., Carson City, Nevada
- Coordinates: 39°09′59″N 119°46′13″W
- NRHP reference No.: 11000785
- Added to NRHP: November 2, 2011

The West Side Historic District in Carson City, Nevada, United States, is a historic district that was listed on the National Register of Historic Places in 2011. It includes properties within an area roughly bounded by Curry, Mountain, 5th & John Sts.
