= William Spence House =

Historic house in Nevada, United States

- U.S. National Register of Historic Places
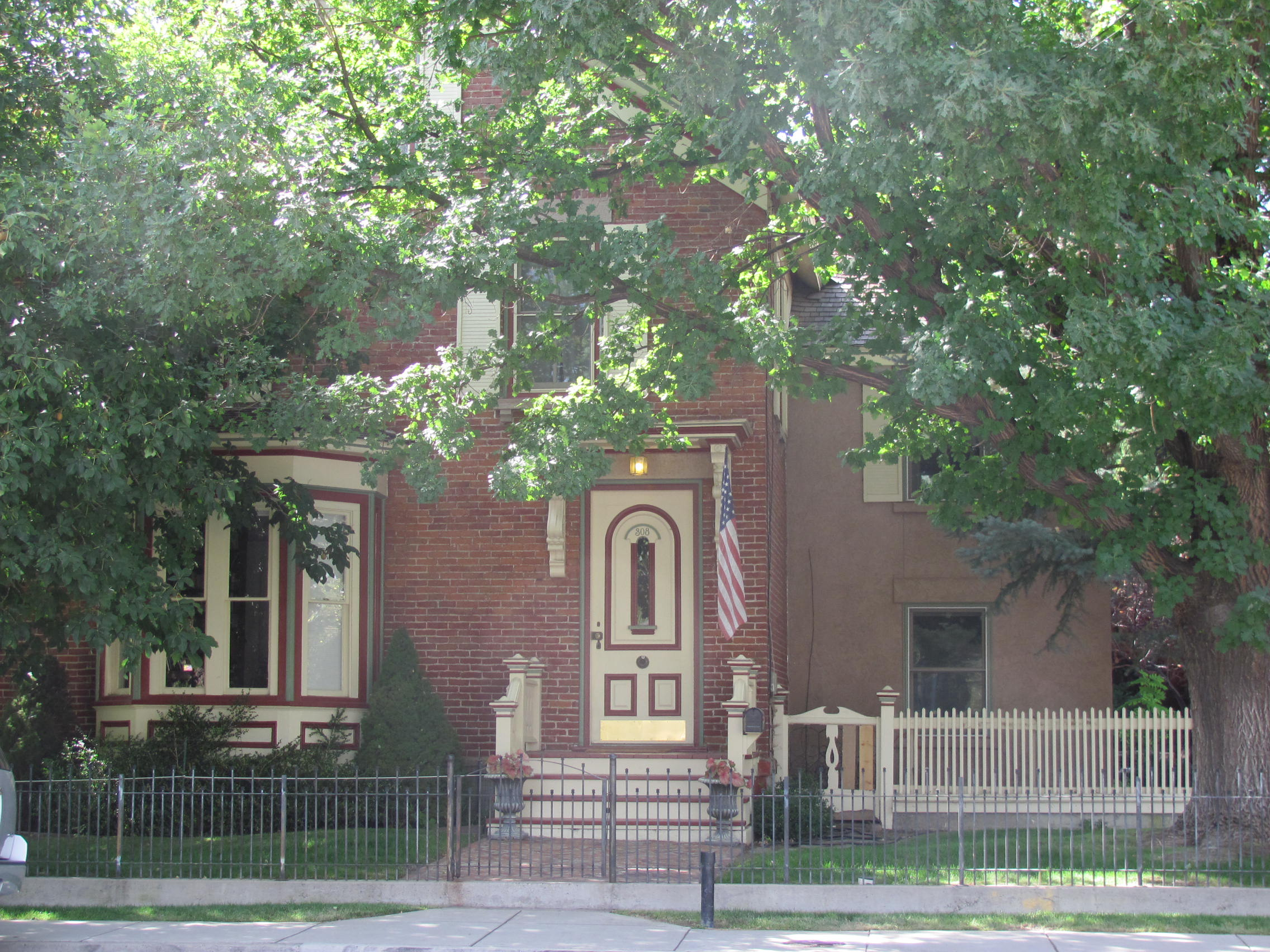

- Location within Nevada Location within the United States
- Location: 308 S. Thompson St., Carson City, Nevada
- Coordinates: 39°9′45″N 119°46′14″W
- Area: less than one acre
- Built: 1875
- Built by: Spence, William Mortimer
- Architectural style: Greek Revival
- NRHP reference No.: 85001602
- Added to NRHP: July 18, 1985

The William Spence House, at 308 S. Thompson St. in Carson City, Nevada, was built in 1875. It includes Greek Revival architecture. It was listed on the National Register of Historic Places in 1985.

It is a two-and-a-half-story, brick building on an 85-by-102-foot (26 m × 31 m) property. It was built by William Mortimer Spence (1822–1920), who was a London-born cabinetmaker and pianowright, who came to the U.S. in 1860. He lived in the house until his death. It was deemed significant as "an architecturally significant dwelling representative of transitional designs common to Carson City, Nevada, in the last quarter of the nineteenth century" and "also significant for its association with the early residential development of Carson City."
