= Bank Saloon =

- U.S. National Register of Historic Places
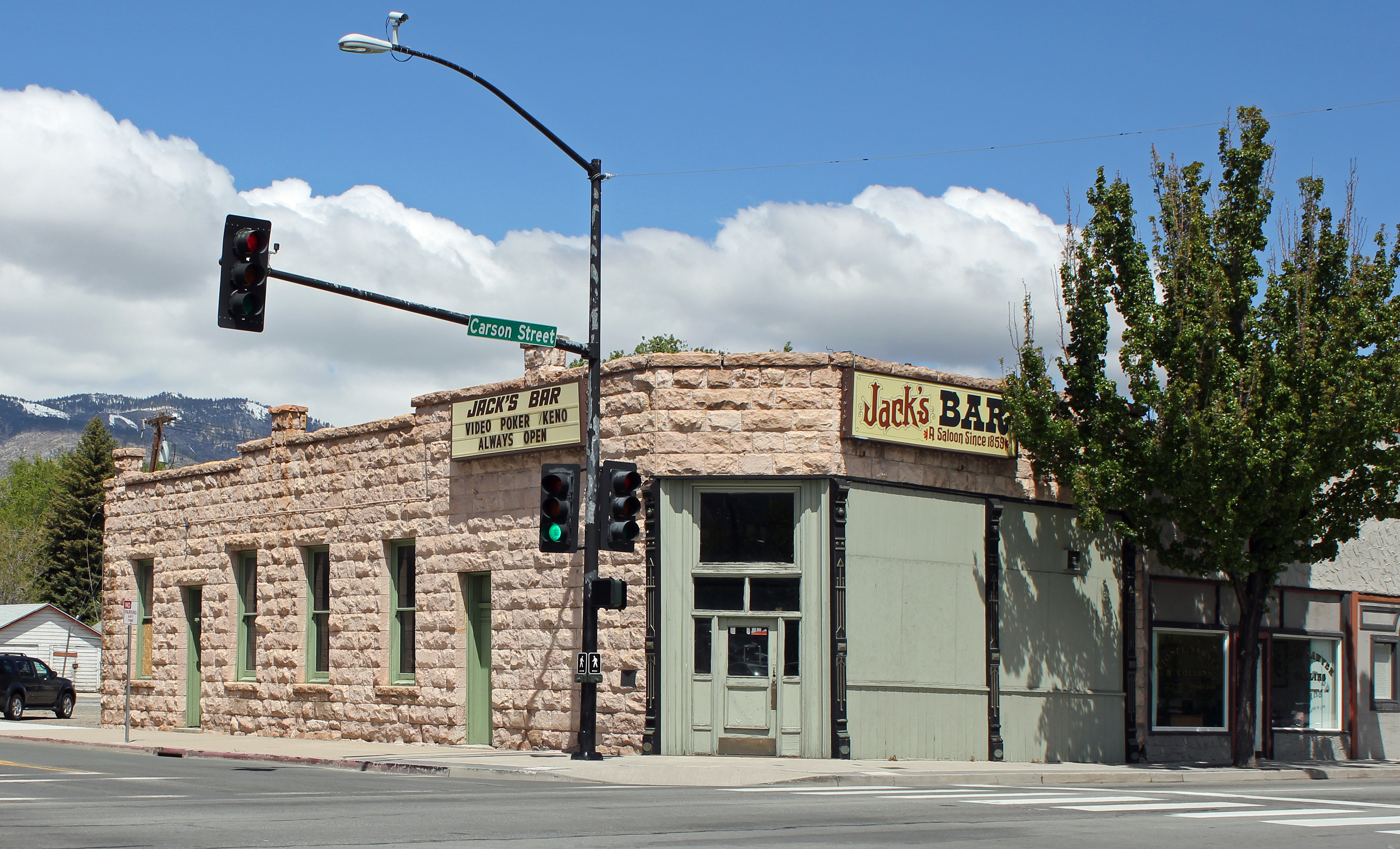

- Location within Nevada Location within the United States
- Location: 418 S. Carson St., Carson City, Nevada
- Coordinates: 39°9′40″N 119°45′58″W
- Area: 1 acre (0.40 ha)
- Built: 1899
- Architectural style: Late Victorian, Victorian Functional
- NRHP reference No.: 80004483
- Added to NRHP: December 10, 1980

The Bank Saloon, at 418 S. Carson St. in Carson City, Nevada, was built in 1899. Also known as Jack's Bar, it was listed on the National Register of Historic Places in 1980.

It was deemed significant as "the representative of a class of establishments that have played a vital role in the social and political atmosphere of Carson City, essentially a small rural community that enjoys the honor of being Nevada's capitol." It opened August 19, 1899 and is apparently the longest continuously operating bar in Carson City, having served even through Prohibition. Being across from the Nevada State Capitol, it is believed to have had hosted many informal meetings that have affected the course of history in the state.

The original Jack's Bar closed in June 2002, and the building fell into severe disrepair, including visibly leaning walls and nesting pigeons. Restoration work began in May 2017 and finished in 2020, with an official re-opening in November of that year as the Bank Saloon once more.
