= Solomon S. Curry House =

Historic house in Michigan, United States

- U.S. National Register of Historic Places
- Michigan State Historic Site
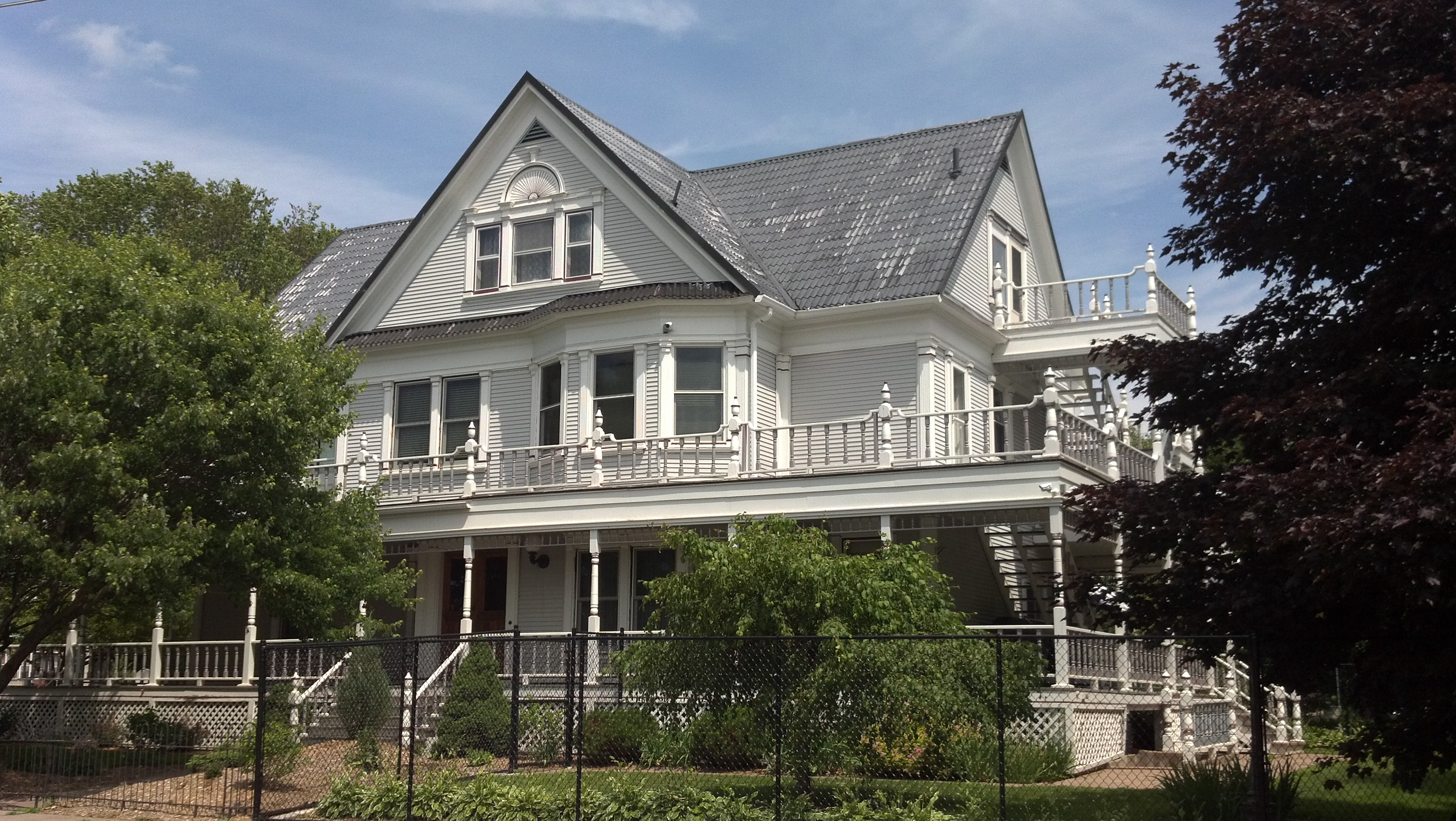
- Side view

- Location within Michigan Location within the United States
- Interactive map
- Location: 631 E. McLeod Ave., Ironwood, Michigan
- Coordinates: 46°27′21″N 90°9′41″W
- Area: 0.3 acres (0.12 ha)
- Built: 1887
- Architectural style: Queen Anne
- NRHP reference No.: 82002833

Significant dates
- Added to NRHP: April 22, 1982
- Designated MSHS: November 7, 1977

The Solomon S. Curry House is a private house located at 631 East McLeod Avenue in Ironwood, Michigan. It was listed on the National Register of Historic Places in 1982 and designated a Michigan State Historic Site in 1977.

== Solomon S. Curry ==
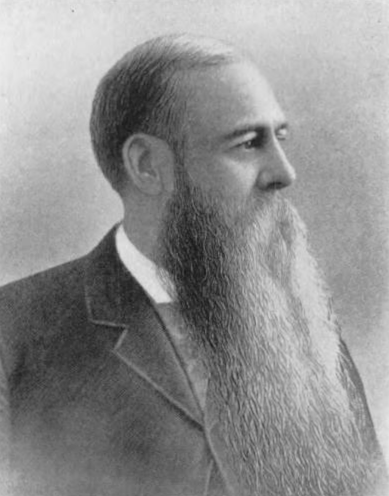
Solomon S. Curry, c. 1900

Solomon S. Curry was born on June 12, 1840, in Curry Hill, Lancaster Township, Ontario, the son of Solomon Curry and Anna Southerland Wood Curry. Curry's father died six months before he was born, and his mother soon remarried, to Alexander McLeod. Curry stayed with the family until he was sixteen, at which time he moved to Potsdam, New York and apprenticed to a blacksmith for three years. He then left to work as a supply clerk for a lumbering firm from Trenton, Ontario. Curry continued in the lumber business until 1861, when emigres from the United States, moving to Canada to avoid military service in the Civil War, flooded the labor market. Curry moved on to Michigan, first to Detroit, and then up to Houghton, where he got a position at the Quincy Mining Company. Curry moved from mine to mine in the Upper Peninsula, learning the trade, and was soon in charge of a small iron mine.

In 1873, Curry moved to Ishpeming, Michigan, where he opened the Curry Mine. In 1880, he was one of the investors who opened the Metropolitan Iron and Land Company, and in 1885 he assumed the presidency of the company. Metropolitan had taken over the Norris Mine near Ironwood in 1882, and under Curry's direction the company began more extensive mining in the Gogebic Range. Curry himself moved to the Ironwood area in 1883, and was instrumental in establishing Ironwood as one of the larger cities in the area. Much of the town was laid out by Curry. Metropolitan earned a substantial profit for a number of years until the Panic of 1896, when Curry lost control of the company.

Curry was also an active politician. He served in the state legislature in 1874 while living in Ishpeming. He was also a candidate for Lieutenant Governor in 1886, a delegate to 1892 Democratic National Convention from Michigan, and Democratic candidate for the Michigan Twelfth district Congressional seat in 1898. He also established both the First National Bank of Ironwood and the People's Bank of Ironwood, and was the first president of both institutions.

In 1867, Curry married Elizabeth Stoup of Ann Arbor, Michigan. The couple had two children: George A. Curry and Mrs. Anna (Ralph) Bartlett. Elizabeth Curry died on April 21, 1914. Curry died on July 29, 1929, and is interred in Riverside Cemetery in Ironwood.

== House history ==
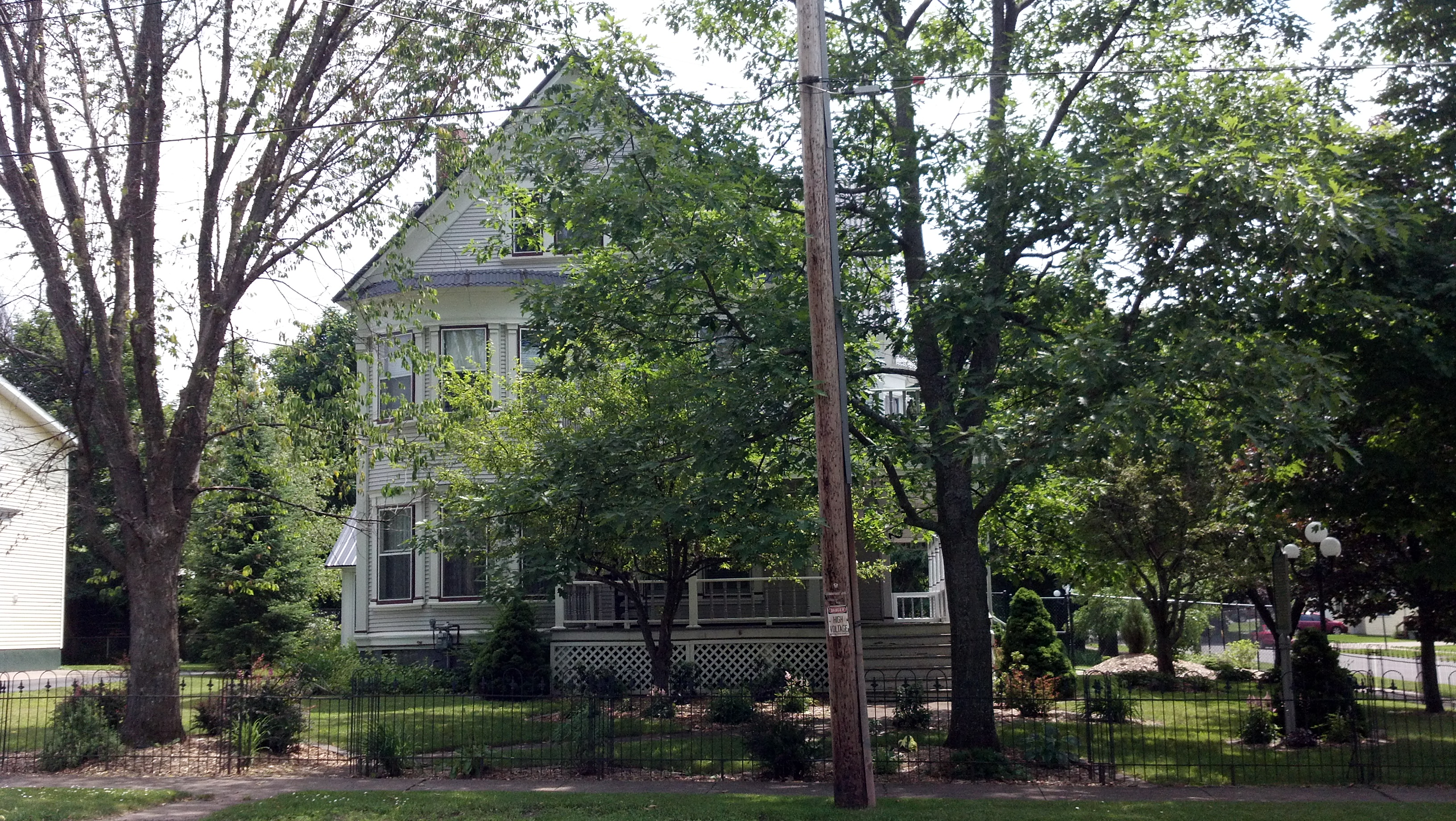
Front view of Solomon S. Curry House

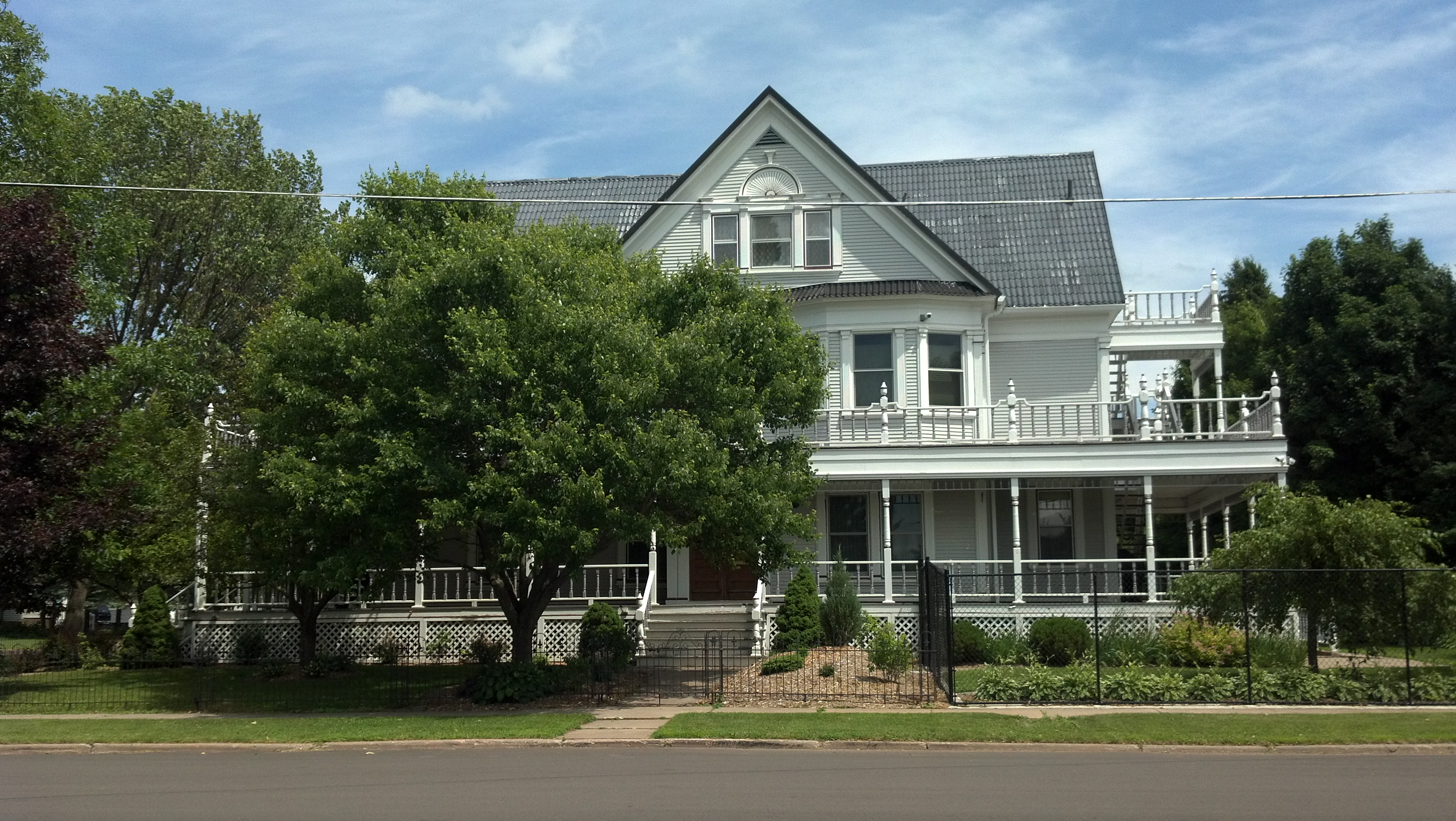
Side view of Solomon S. Curry House

In 1887, fire destroyed much of the town of Ironwood. After the fire, Curry purchased land and built this house for his own use. After Curry's death in 1929, the house was used as a hospital and a nursing home. The balcony on the second floor was enclosed in 1913 and a kitchen was added to the rear in 1952. The house was later turned into an antique shop and private residence.

== House description ==
The Solomon S. Curry House is a 2 1/2-story vernacular Queen Anne structure, sided with clapboard and shiplap and sitting on a concrete foundation. The first floor has a long, L-shaped open porch; a matching porch on the second story is enclosed with double-hung, six-over-six windows. The roof is cross-gabled with central rectangular attic windows, flanked by two smaller windows, on the gable ends. Several other windows in the house have imported stained glass and Tiffany windows. The interior features 18 rooms, including a ballroom, and ornate woodwork.
