= Nevada State Printing Office =

- U.S. National Register of Historic Places
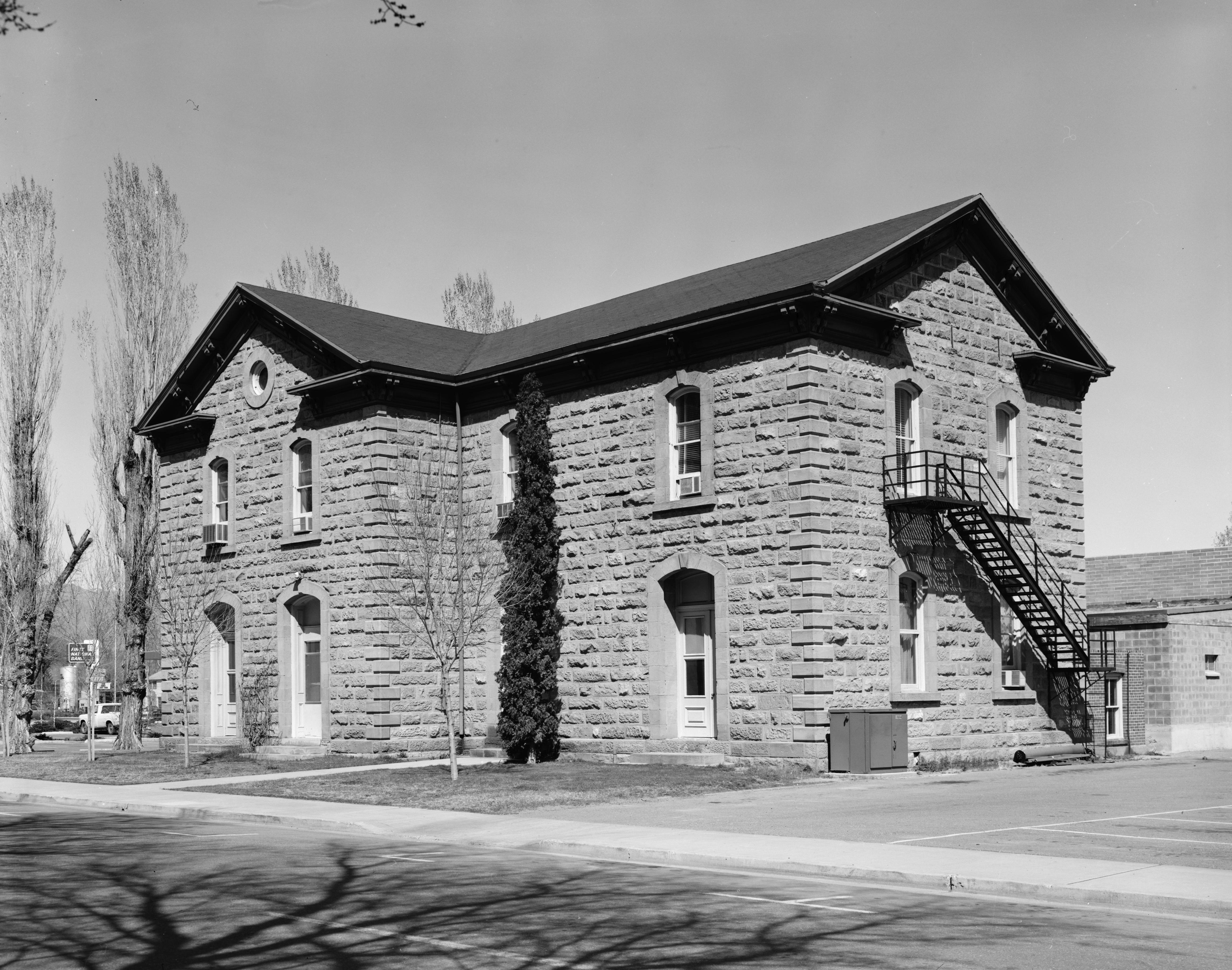

- Location within Nevada Location within the United States
- Location: 101 S. Fall St., Carson City, Nevada
- Coordinates: 39°9′49″N 119°45′50″W
- Area: 0.5 acres (0.20 ha)
- Built: 1885-1886
- Built by: Curtis, M. J.
- Architectural style: Renaissance
- NRHP reference No.: 78003212
- Added to NRHP: March 29, 1978

The Nevada State Printing Office is located at 301 S. Stewart St. Carson City, NV. The Nevada State Printing Office provides printing services to Nevada government entities and is not open to the public. The remainder of this article is about the historical printing office.

The original Nevada State Printing Office, located within the Nevada State Capitol grounds in Carson City, Nevada, was built in 1885–86. Also known as the Old State Printing Office, The building was a work of Reno architect M.J. Curtis. It is located across from the Nevada State Capitol building. Also known as the Old State Printing Office, it was a work of two architects named Morrill J. Curtis and Seymore Pixley. It is the second oldest State-built structure in the Capitol Complex.

It is a "substantial" building built with stone walls made of 27 courses of one foot height sandstone ashlar blocks. Lesser quality extensions of the building were added in 1938, 1951, 1955 and 1958. It was listed on the National Register of Historic Places in 1978.

== History and Context ==
In order to fulfill the printing needs of the state, the governor signed an act for the creation of the office of the State Printer on 10 January 1865. And it was passed by the Nevada State Legislature. Officials did it through contracting with private sector printers. The State Printer was terminated by the 1879 Legislature and generated the office of Superintendent of State Printing. The establishment in 1885-86 of the State Printing Building was led by this act. State Printing was accommodated for nearly 80 years in this building. Part of The Division of Archives and Records is currently placed in the building. State Printing was shifted to its present location in 1964.

== Usage ==
When the Nevada State Printing Office was completed in 1886, it accommodated the government presses and offices starting from 1886 to 1964. Because of such occupancy of the office, officials let ivy grow on the surface of the building considering its character. The Division of Historic Preservation and Archaeology put up a historical marker close by the entrance at the Nevada State Library.

== See also ==
- Nevada State Capitol
- National Register of Historic Places
