= Carson Brewing Company =

- U.S. National Register of Historic Places
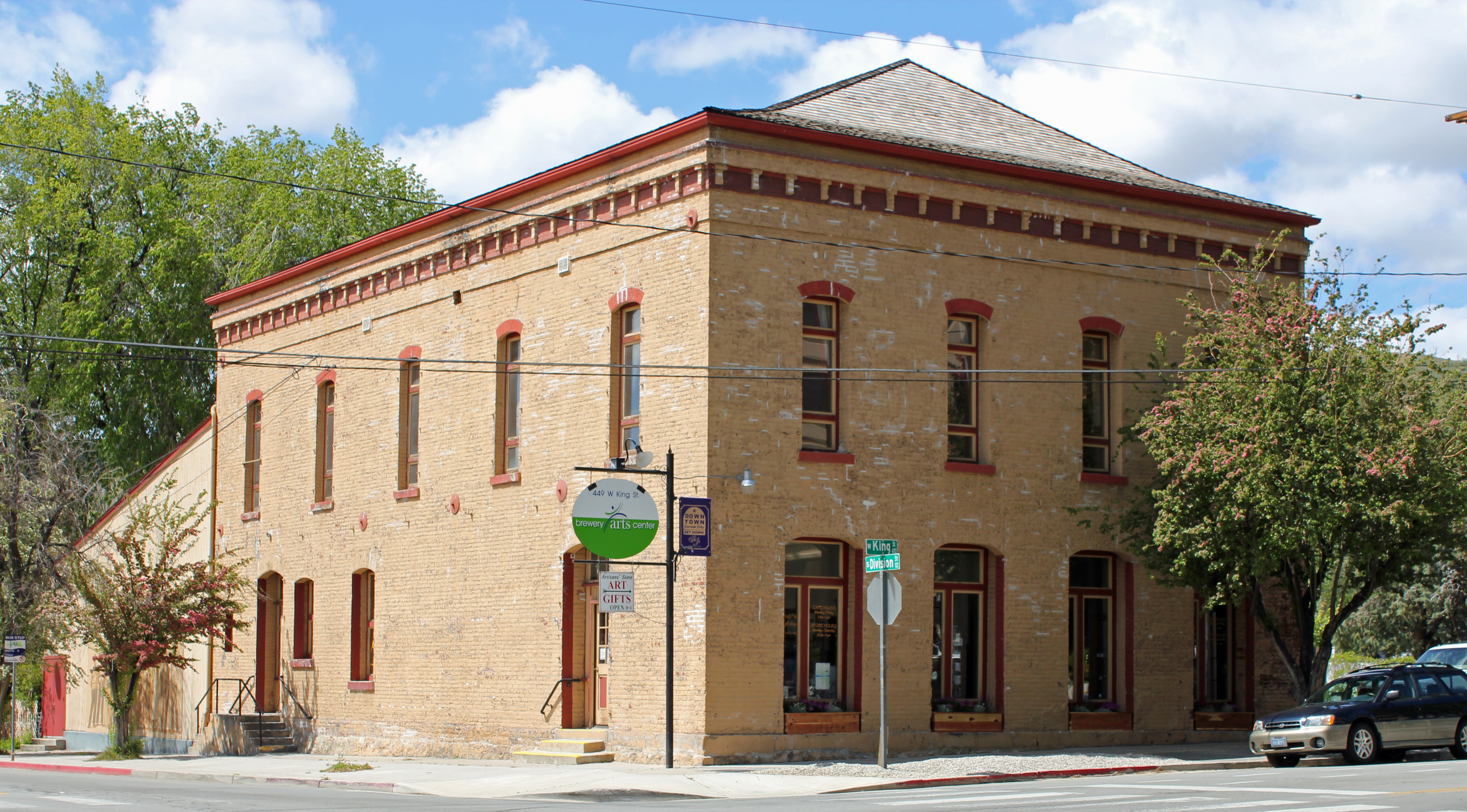

- Location within Nevada Location within the United States
- Location: 102 S. Division St., Carson City, Nevada
- Coordinates: 39°9′49″N 119°46′7″W
- Area: 0.5 acres (0.20 ha)
- Built: 1864
- NRHP reference No.: 78003210
- Added to NRHP: August 18, 1978

The Carson Brewing Company, at 102 S. Division St. in Carson City, Nevada, was built in 1864. Also known as the Carson City Nevada Appeal Building, it was listed on the National Register of Historic Places in 1978. It was originally a brewery and bar.

It is one of Carson City's "oldest and largest brick buildings remaining from Nevada's territorial days".

It is a two-story brick building that is just one of multiple buildings in a larger original complex; others have lost integrity and are not included in the listing.

In 1971, it became an arts center, known as the Brewery Arts Center. One of the groups that helped save the building was the Nevada Artists Association, which still maintains its gallery at the site.

== Beverage production ==
Carson Brewing company was originally a brewery, bar and lodging house, and has been described as the "West's first microbrewery". The brewery was located on the bottom floor of the building, and the bar and lodging room was on the second floor. The company originally brewed steam beer, which it purveyed in bottles, barrels and kegs, and changed its operations to produce a lager named "Tahoe Beer" circa 1910. During this time, the company also began producing bottled mineral water sourced from Carson Hot Springs and bottled soft drinks, as well as manufacturing and purveying artificial ice.

== See also ==
- List of the oldest buildings in Nevada
