= Ormsby–Rosser House =

Historic house in Nevada, United States

- U.S. National Register of Historic Places
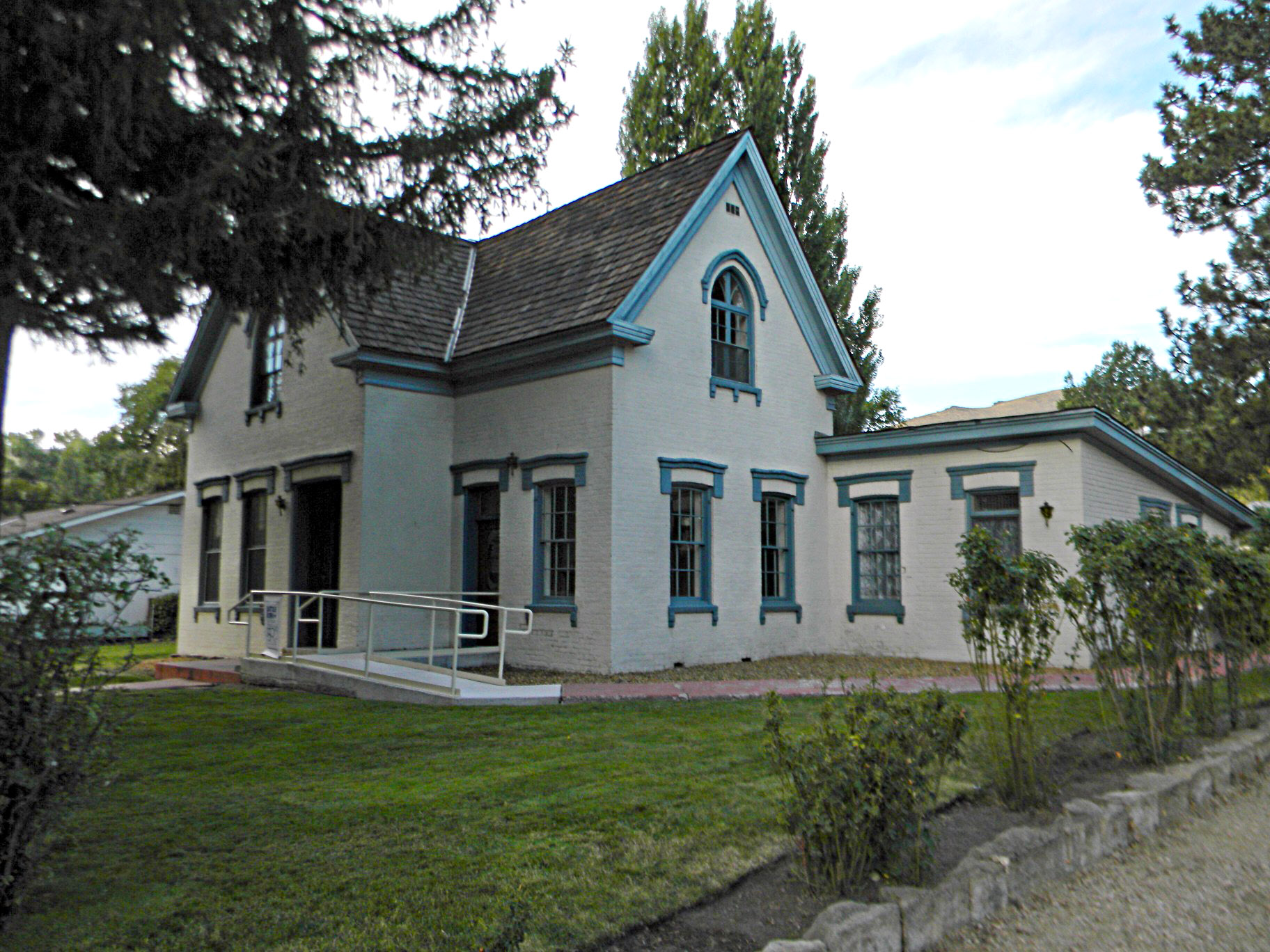

- Location within Nevada Location within the United States
- Location: 304 S. Minnesota St., Carson City, Nevada
- Coordinates: 39°9′44″N 119°46′11″W
- Area: 0.2 acres (0.081 ha)
- Built: 1862
- Built by: Israel, T.T.
- NRHP reference No.: 79003437
- Added to NRHP: May 17, 1979

The Ormsby–Rosser House, at 304 S. Minnesota St. in Carson City, Nevada, is a historic house that was built during 1862–63. It was home of the widow of Major William B. Ormsby, who was killed in 1860 in the Pyramid Lake War. The house hosted Mark Twain and others. It was later owned by carpenter/cabinet-maker Sture Svensson, who added an addition in 1960.

It was listed on the National Register of Historic Places in 1979.
