= Orion Clemens House =

Historic house in Nevada, United States

- U.S. National Register of Historic Places
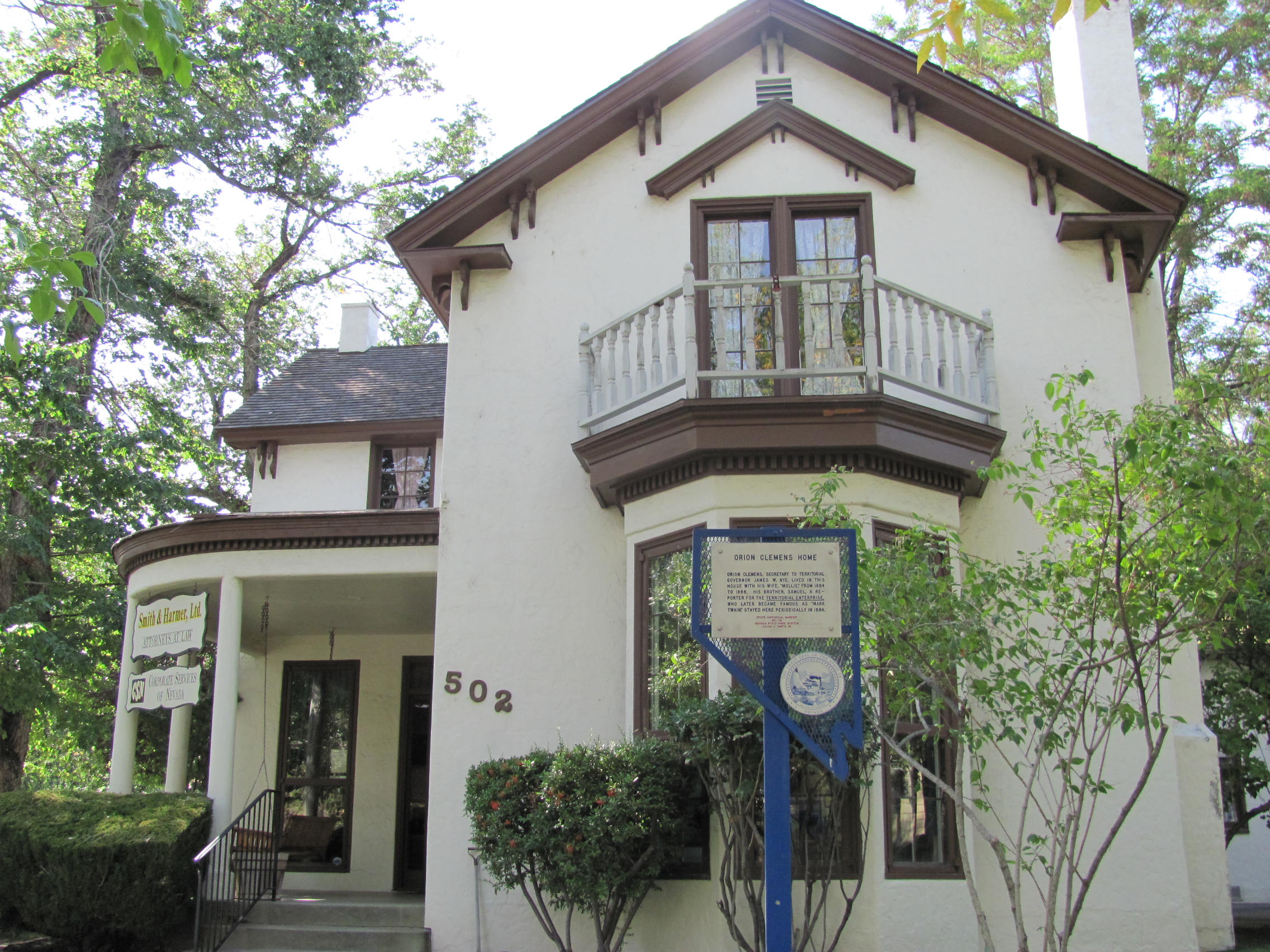

- Location within Nevada Location within the United States
- Location: 502 N. Division St., Carson City, Nevada
- Coordinates: 39°10′0″N 119°46′7″W
- Area: 0.2 acres (0.081 ha)
- Built: 1862
- Architectural style: Late Victorian
- NRHP reference No.: 79003439
- Added to NRHP: March 12, 1979

The Orion Clemens House, also known as Mark Twain's House, is a two-story Late Victorian house located at 502 N. Division St. in Carson City, the capital of the U.S. state of Nevada. It was listed on the National Register of Historic Places in 1979.

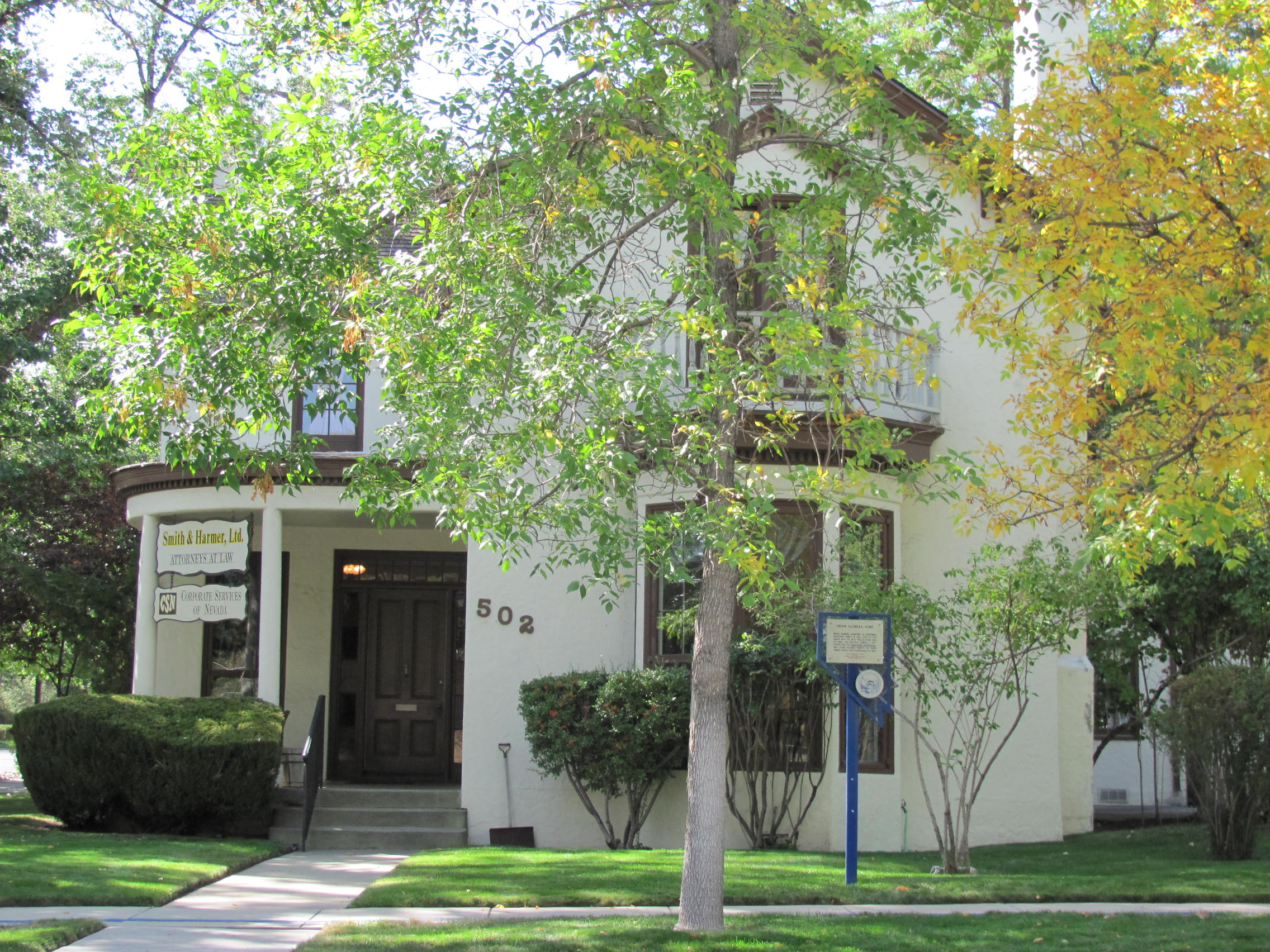

The listing included two contributing buildings.

The house was built in 1862 by Orion Clemens, a lawyer who served as Secretary to territorial governor James W. Nye in the Nevada Territory. It has also been known as the Governor's Mansion from times when Orion was territorial governor pro tem while Governor James W. Nye was absent.

Orion Clemens and Mollie Clemens resided in Orion Clemens House until living the territory in May 1964.

The house often hosted Orion's younger brother Samuel Clemens, better known as Mark Twain.

== See also ==
- List of the oldest buildings in Nevada
