= Dr. William Henry Cavell House =

Historic house in Nevada, United States

- U.S. National Register of Historic Places
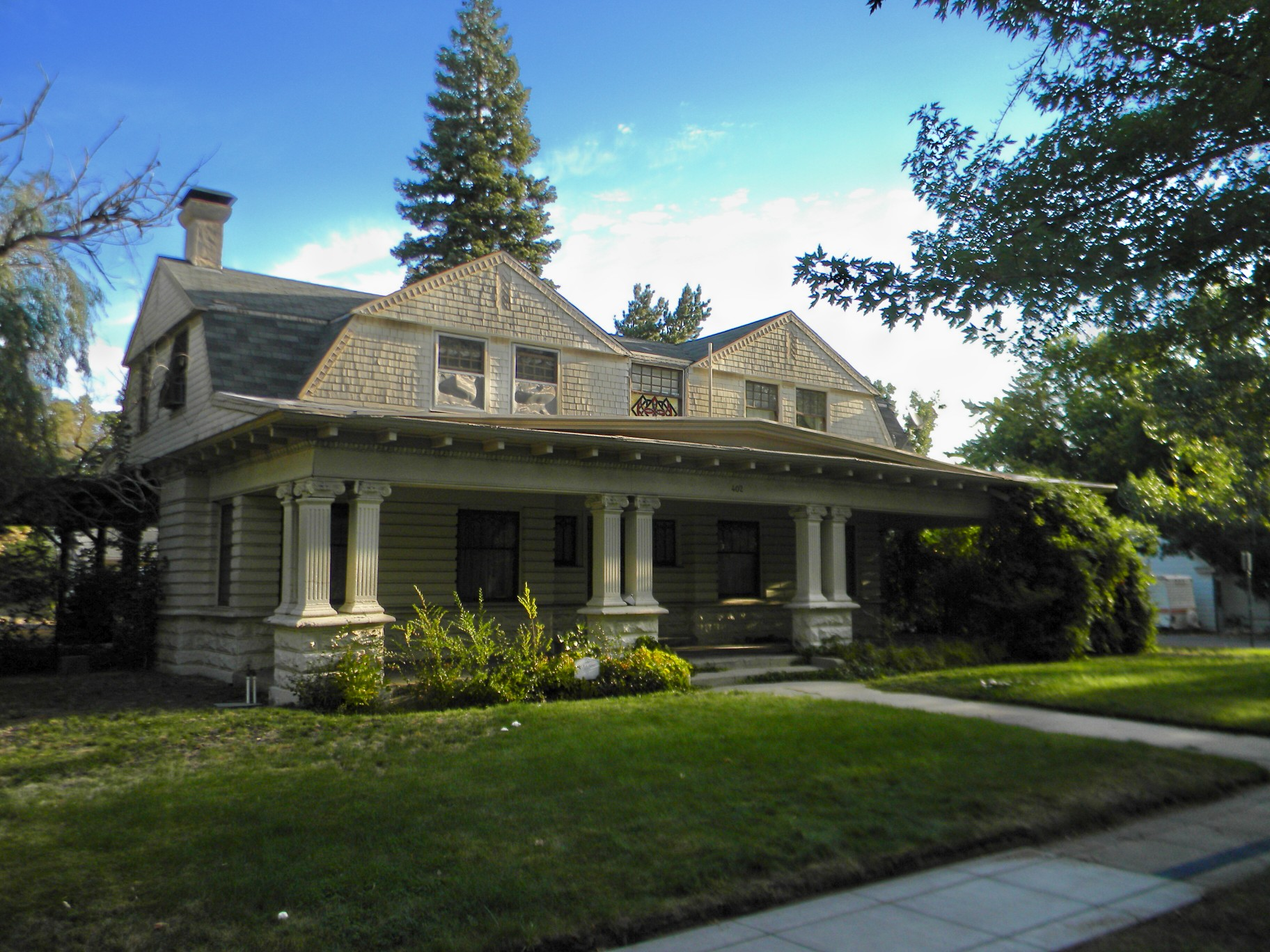

- Location within Nevada Location within the United States
- Location: 402 W. Robinson St., Carson City, Nevada
- Coordinates: 39°10′2″N 119°46′46″W
- Area: less than one acre
- Built: 1907
- Built by: Conant, John
- Architectural style: Shingle Style, Colonial Revival
- NRHP reference No.: 86001655
- Added to NRHP: June 22, 1987

The Dr. William Henry Cavell House, at 402 W. Robinson St. in Carson City, Nevada, United States, was built in 1907. It is one of two Carson City houses constructed from the same plans, designed by Oakland, California architect John Conant. It includes Shingle Style and Colonial Revival architectural elements. It was listed on the National Register of Historic Places in 1987. It was deemed significant for association with dentist Dr. William Henry Cavell, and was originally a wedding gift from him to Ida Platt Cavell. It stayed in the Cavell family until 1951.
