= Abraham Curry House =

Historic house in Nevada, United States

- U.S. National Register of Historic Places
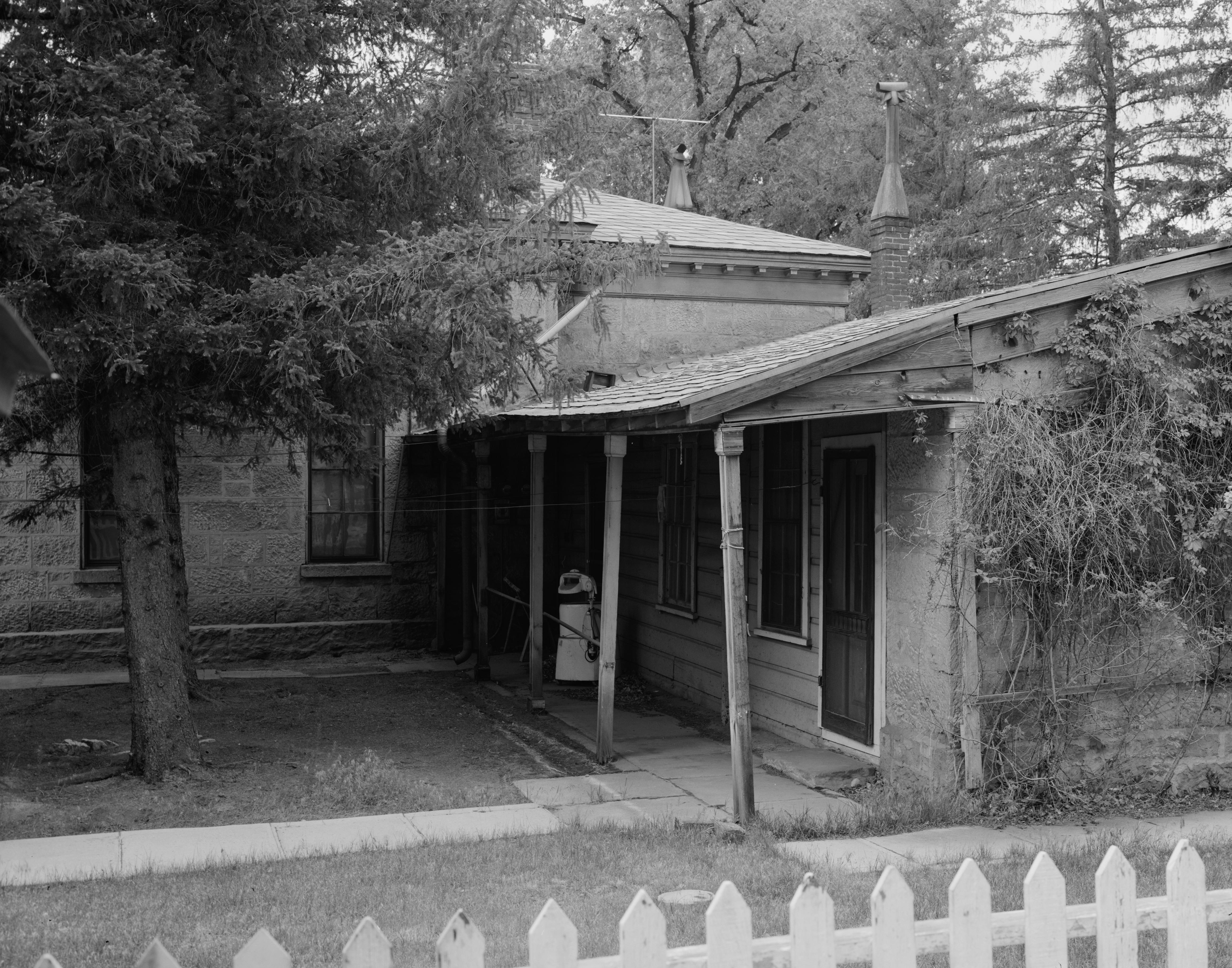

- Location within Nevada Location within the United States
- Location: 406 N. Nevada St., Carson City, Nevada
- Coordinates: 39°9′57″N 119°46′8″W
- Area: less than one acre
- Built: c.1871
- Built by: Curry, Abraham
- NRHP reference No.: 87000501
- Added to NRHP: March 30, 1987

The Abraham Curry House, at 406 N. Nevada St. in Carson City, Nevada, was built c. 1871. It was listed on the National Register of Historic Places in 1987. It is a one-story masonry building that was home for Carson City founder Abraham Curry (d. 1873), who was first Superintendent of the United States Mint in Carson City.
