= Tonopah Volunteer Firehouse and Gymnasium =

- Tonapah Volunteer Firehouse and Gymnasium
- U.S. National Register of Historic Places
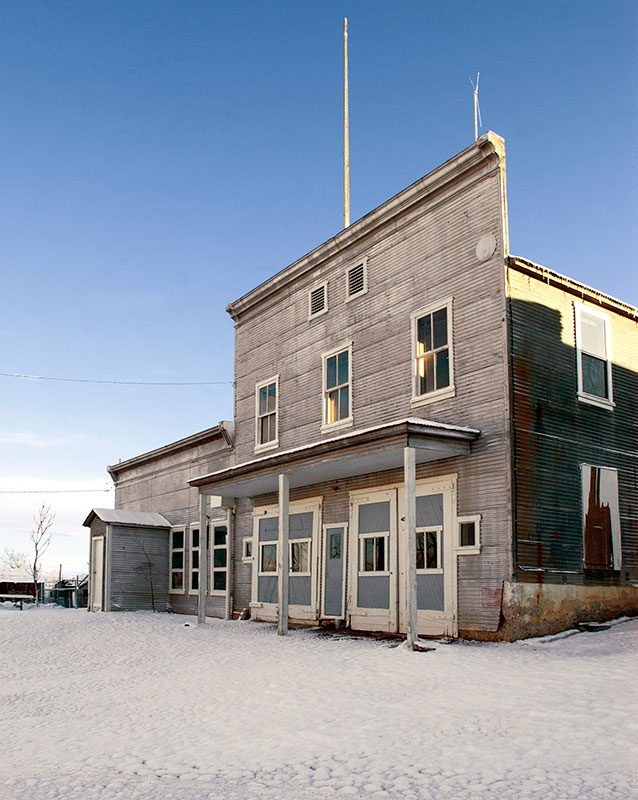

- Location within Nevada Location within the United States
- Location: Brougher and Burro Sts., Tonopah, Nevada
- Coordinates: 38.06853°N 117.22972°W
- Area: less than one acre
- Built: 1907
- Built by: Baker, E.E.
- MPS: Tonopah MRA
- NRHP reference No.: 82003253
- Added to NRHP: May 20, 1982

The Tonopah Volunteer Firehouse and Gymnasium is a historic fire station located at the intersection of Brougher and Burro Streets in Tonopah, Nevada. Built in 1907, the firehouse housed Tonopah's volunteer fire department. The firehouse was built by Tonopah's newly appointed fire chief to address inadequacies in the town's fire protection services, which had failed to stop a major fire in 1904. A gymnasium for the firefighters was constructed next to the fire station in 1908. Tonopah still suffered three major fires after its fire station was built, including a 1920 fire which damaged the station itself; the building was subsequently restored to its original condition.

The firehouse was added to the National Register of Historic Places on May 20, 1982.

The Water Company of Tonopah Building is adjacent.
