= Water Company of Tonopah Building =

- Water Company of Tonapah Building
- U.S. National Register of Historic Places
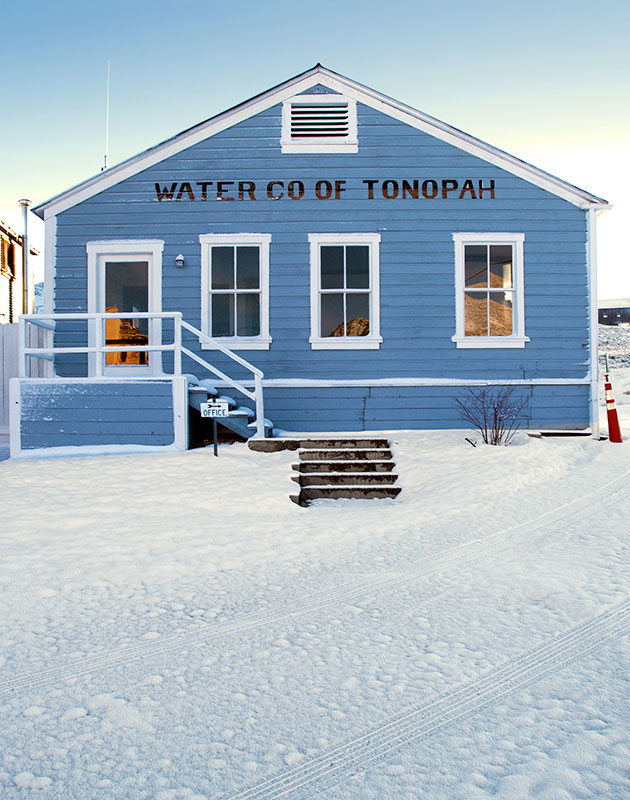

- Location within Nevada Location within the United States
- Location: Burro and Brougher Aves., Tonopah, Nevada
- Coordinates: 38.06841°N 117.22963°W
- Area: less than one acre
- Built: 1909
- MPS: Tonopah MRA
- NRHP reference No.: 82003256
- Added to NRHP: May 20, 1982

The Water Company of Tonopah Building is a historic building located at the intersection of Burrough and Brougher Avenues in Tonopah, Nevada. Built in 1909, the building housed offices for the Water Company of Tonopah. Tonopah's first water service began in 1902, when three water companies each gained franchises to provide water to one district of the town. By 1905, Philadelphia businessman John Brock owned two of the water companies, which he consolidated into the Water Company of Tonopah. Brock also owned multiple mines in Tonopah and the local railroad. The Water Company of Tonopah Building is the only surviving building which belonged to one of Tonopah's early water companies.

The building was added to the National Register of Historic Places on May 20, 1982.

The Tonopah Volunteer Firehouse and Gymnasium is adjacent.
