= Cave Rock =

Cave Rock may refer to:

- Cave Rock (horse), an American Thoroughbred race horse
- Cave Rock (location), a stone formation in Nevada, US
- Cave Rock, Sumner, volcanic rock formation in New Zealand
- Cave Rock Tunnel, a dual bore highway tunnel on U.S. Route 50

Other:

- Cave-In-Rock, Illinois, a village in Hardin County, Illinois, US
- Cave-in-Rock State Park, state park in Illinois, US
- Orgasm (Cromagnon album), 1969 album by Cromagnon, later reissued under the title Cave Rock
