= U.S. Route 50 in Nevada =

Section of U.S. Highway in Nevada, United States

U.S. Route 50
- The Loneliest Road in America
- US 50 highlighted in red

Route information
- Maintained by NDOT
- Length: 408.82 mi (657.93 km)
- Existed: 1926–present
- Tourist routes: Lincoln Highway

Major junctions
- West end: US 50 at the California state line in Stateline
- I-580 / US 395 / US 395 Bus. in Carson City; US 50 Alt. / US 95 Alt. in Silver Springs; US 50 Alt. in Leeteville Junction; US 95 in Fallon; US 6 / US 93 in Ely; US 93 in Majors Place
- East end: US 6 / US 50 at the Utah state line near Baker

Location
- Country: United States
- State: Nevada
- Counties: Douglas, City of Carson City, Lyon, Churchill, Lander, Eureka, White Pine

Highway system
- United States Numbered Highway System; List; Special; Divided; Nevada State Highway System; Interstate; US; State; Pre‑1976; Scenic
| ← SR 28 | → I-80 |

U.S. Route 50 (US 50) is a transcontinental highway in the United States, stretching from West Sacramento, California, in the west to Ocean City, Maryland, on the east coast. The Nevada portion crosses the center of the state and was named "The Loneliest Road in America" by Life magazine in July 1986. The name was intended as a pejorative, but Nevada officials seized it as a marketing slogan. The name originates from large desolate areas traversed by the route, with few or no signs of civilization. The highway crosses several large desert valleys separated by numerous mountain ranges towering over the valley floors, in what is known as the Basin and Range province of the Great Basin.

US 50 has a diverse route through the state, traversing the resort communities of Lake Tahoe, the state capital in Carson City, historical sites such as Fort Churchill State Historic Park, petroglyphs, alpine forests, desert valleys, ghost towns, and Great Basin National Park.

The route was constructed over a historic corridor, initially used for the Pony Express and Central Overland Route and later for the Lincoln Highway. Before the formation of the U.S. Highway System, most of US 50 in Nevada was designated State Route 2. The routing east of Ely has changed significantly from the original plans. The route change resulted from a rivalry between Nevada and Utah over which transcontinental route was better to serve California-bound traffic, the Lincoln Highway or the Victory Highway.

== Route description ==
US 50 crosses the central portion of Nevada, entering the west side of the state near Lake Tahoe and exiting the east side near Great Basin National Park. The route crosses mostly desolate terrain in its journey across the state; US 50 passes through several large desert valleys and basins. The highway crosses 17 named mountain passes that break up the Nevada desert. To crest some of the passes along US 50 requires navigating steep 8% grades and hairpin turns through pine forests to reach elevations of over 7,000 feet (2,100 m).

In the stretch of highway between Fallon and Delta, Utah, a span of 409 miles (658 km), there are three small towns: Austin, Eureka, and Ely. This span is roughly the same distance as Boston, Massachusetts, to Baltimore, Maryland, or Paris, France, to Zürich, Switzerland. Traffic along US 50 varies greatly. The average annual daily traffic in 2007 ranged from 52,000 vehicles per day in Carson City, to 530 vehicles per day near the Duckwater turnoff.

In addition to portions being designated the Loneliest Road and Lincoln Highway, the portion concurrent with Interstate 580 in Carson City is designated the Carson City Deputy Sheriff Carl Howell Memorial Freeway in honor of a sheriff's officer who was shot to death while attempting to rescue a victim of domestic violence from her house.

=== Western Nevada ===
US 50 enters Nevada from California as a busy four-lane thoroughfare on the shores of alpine Lake Tahoe in Stateline, Nevada. The highway follows the eastern shore, squeezing between the lake and the crest of the Carson Range. In one narrow spot, the highway cuts through the mountains via the Cave Rock Tunnel. Eventually, the route crests the Carson Range at Spooner Summit and then descends into Nevada's capital, Carson City. Carson Street and William Street formerly carried the highway through the city; however, in 2017, US 50 was moved to a freeway alignment constructed for Interstate 580.

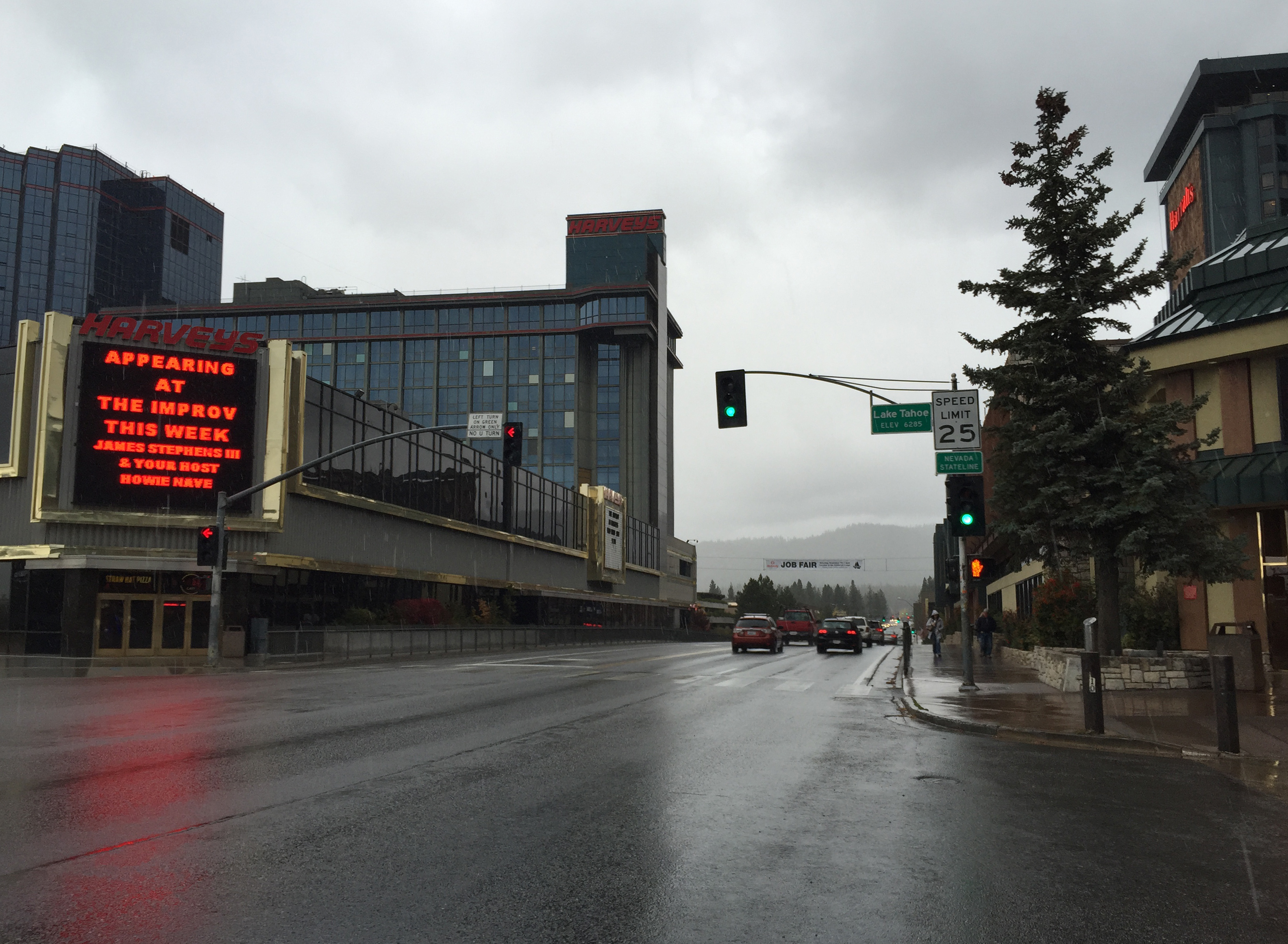
View east along US 50 entering Stateline, Nevada, from South Lake Tahoe, California

After Carson City, US 50 follows the Carson River towards the Lahontan Valley. This portion is also mostly four-lane, serving the commuter towns of Dayton and Silver Springs as well as passing by Fort Churchill State Historic Park and Lahontan State Recreation Area. In addition to the trails of the Pony Express and Lincoln Highway, this portion parallels the Carson River branch of the California Trail. The Carson River forms the southern edge of the Forty Mile Desert. This desert, located between the termini of the Carson and Humboldt rivers, was the most dreaded part of the California Trail, where travelers had to endure 40 miles (64 km) of desert heat with no usable water.

At Silver Springs, U.S. Route 50 Alternate splits from the main route. Both branches are sometimes called the loneliest road, and the promotional passport issued by the Nevada Commission on Tourism includes a stamping location at Fernley, along the alternate branch. The two branches rejoin west of Fallon. Fallon, home to the Naval Air Station Fallon or TOPGUN, is an agricultural community along the last usable water of the Carson River. The town is located just south of the river's terminus at the Carson Sink. Leaving Fallon, the highway passes by ancient petroglyph sites at Grimes Point and then Sand Mountain, a 600-foot (180 m) sand dune.

=== Fallon to Austin ===
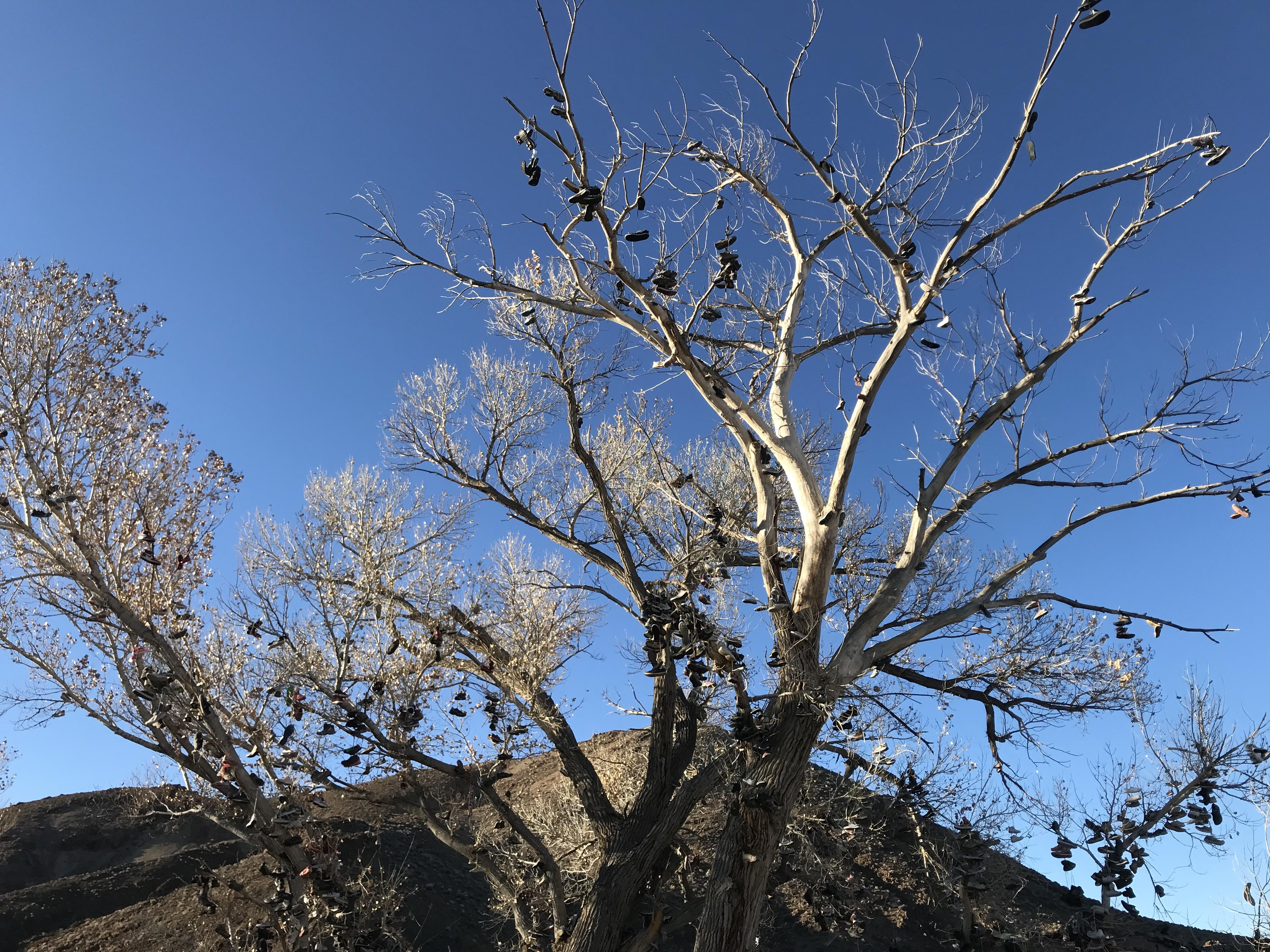
Shoe tree along Highway 50 Nevada in the United States

The scenery and level of traffic changes upon leaving the Fallon area. The road narrows from four lanes to two and crosses remote terrain characterized by Basin and Range topography. The summits start out low and gradually increase in elevation. The features in the first basins include Labou Flat, a dry lake used by the US Navy for low-level flight operations, and Dixie Valley, with several visible fault scarps that resulted from the magnitude 7.1 Dixie Valley/Fairview earthquake in 1954. Dixie Valley is now a US Navy Electronic Warfare Range.

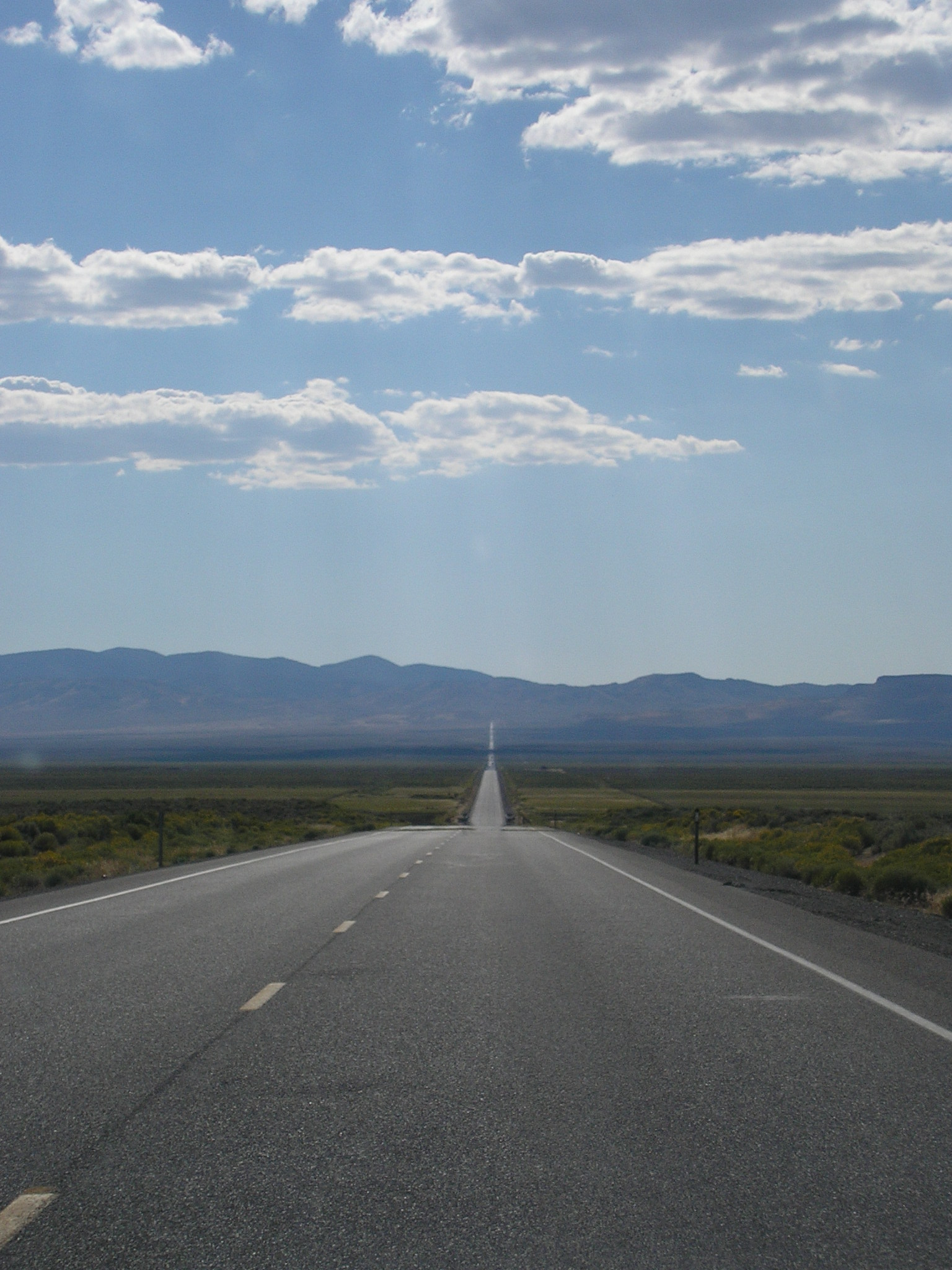
US 50 stretching across the Nevada desert

The next services are in the single-building settlement of Middlegate, a roadhouse that has served as a restaurant, bar, hotel, and refueling station since the Pony Express era of the 19th century. The building features Lincoln Highway and Pony Express era artifacts as well as plaques from various historical societies confirming the station is authentic. The station is the modern turnoff to Berlin–Ichthyosaur State Park, a preserved ghost town surrounded by Ichthyosaur fossils.

Nearby is a grove of cottonwoods, which includes a shoe tree. Patrons of the bar at Middlegate are unsure of the origin of the shoe tree; however, most believe it started sometime in the mid-1980s. A legend has formed about how a young man was traveling to Reno with his bride-to-be. When she balked and got out of the car, he threw her shoes in the tree so she couldn't get away. A reporter for the San Francisco Chronicle began to study the phenomenon of shoe trees after seeing the one at Middlegate, stating to his knowledge this was the biggest in the world. It was discovered on December 31, 2010, that the original shoe tree had been chopped down, possibly by vandals. Since then visitors have started a new shoe tree with another tree in the grove.

East of Middlegate, the paths of the Pony Express, Lincoln Highway, and US 50 diverge, using different passes to cross the Desatoya Mountains. They rejoin west of Austin. The first paved route of the Lincoln Highway is preserved as State Route 722.

=== Austin to Ely ===
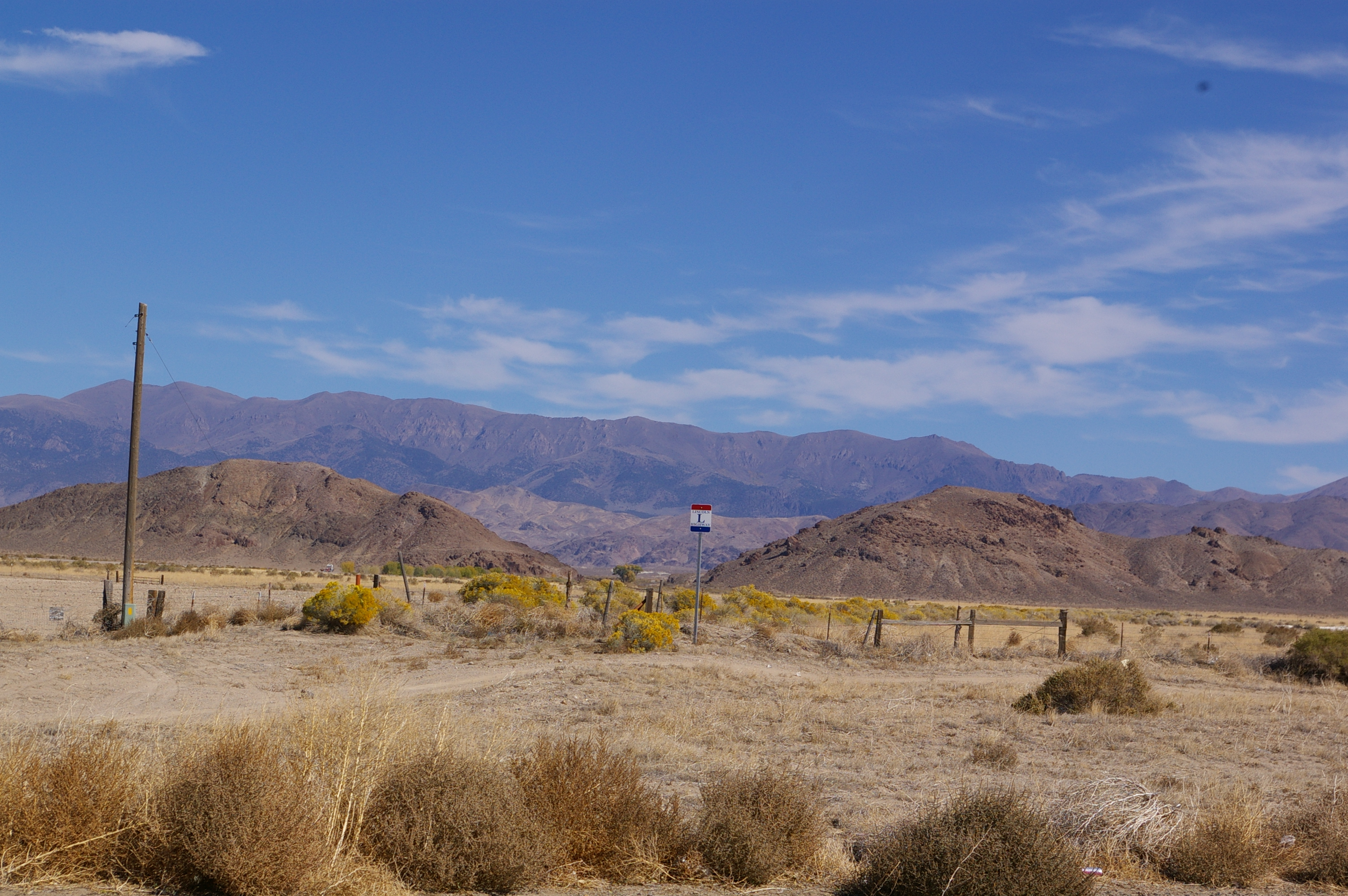
Lincoln Highway Sign along US 50 at Middlegate with the Middlegate shoe tree visible in the distance

Austin lies 110 miles (180 km) east of Fallon. The city, founded by Pony Express riders who discovered silver, was a mining boomtown that now describes itself as a living ghost town. In 1862, at the peak of the silver boom, Austin had a population of 10,000 people. Today, about 300 residents remain. Perched above the town and just to the south of the highway is Stokes Castle, a long abandoned monument to a prominent eastern family with local mining interests. Passing Austin, travelers encounter hairpin turns and steep grades in the ascent up Austin Summit in the Toiyabe Range. This area is inside the Humboldt-Toiyabe National Forest, the first part of US 50 to run inside a national forest since leaving Lake Tahoe. At Hickison Summit, about 20 miles (32 km) east of Austin, is the Hickison Petroglyph Recreation Area, a rest area and campground featuring a walking tour of petroglyphs.

The next town is Eureka, which bills itself as the "Friendliest Town on the Loneliest Road in America". Eureka was similarly founded as a mining boom town. Although mining has diminished, it remains a large component of the community and its economy. The centerpiece of the historical district of Eureka is the Eureka Opera House, built in 1880.

Past Eureka is Ely, founded as a stage coach station along the Pony Express and Central Overland Route. Ely's mining boom came later than booms of other towns along US 50, with the discovery of copper in 1906. Though the railroads connecting the first transcontinental railroad to the mines in Austin and Eureka have long been removed, the railroad to Ely is preserved as a heritage railway by the Nevada Northern Railway and known as the Ghost Train of Old Ely. Here US 50 departs the historical routes of the Lincoln Highway, Pony Express, and State Route 2. These routes proceeded northeast towards Salt Lake City, while US 50 joins with US 6 and US 93 heading east towards the state line.

=== Eastern Nevada ===
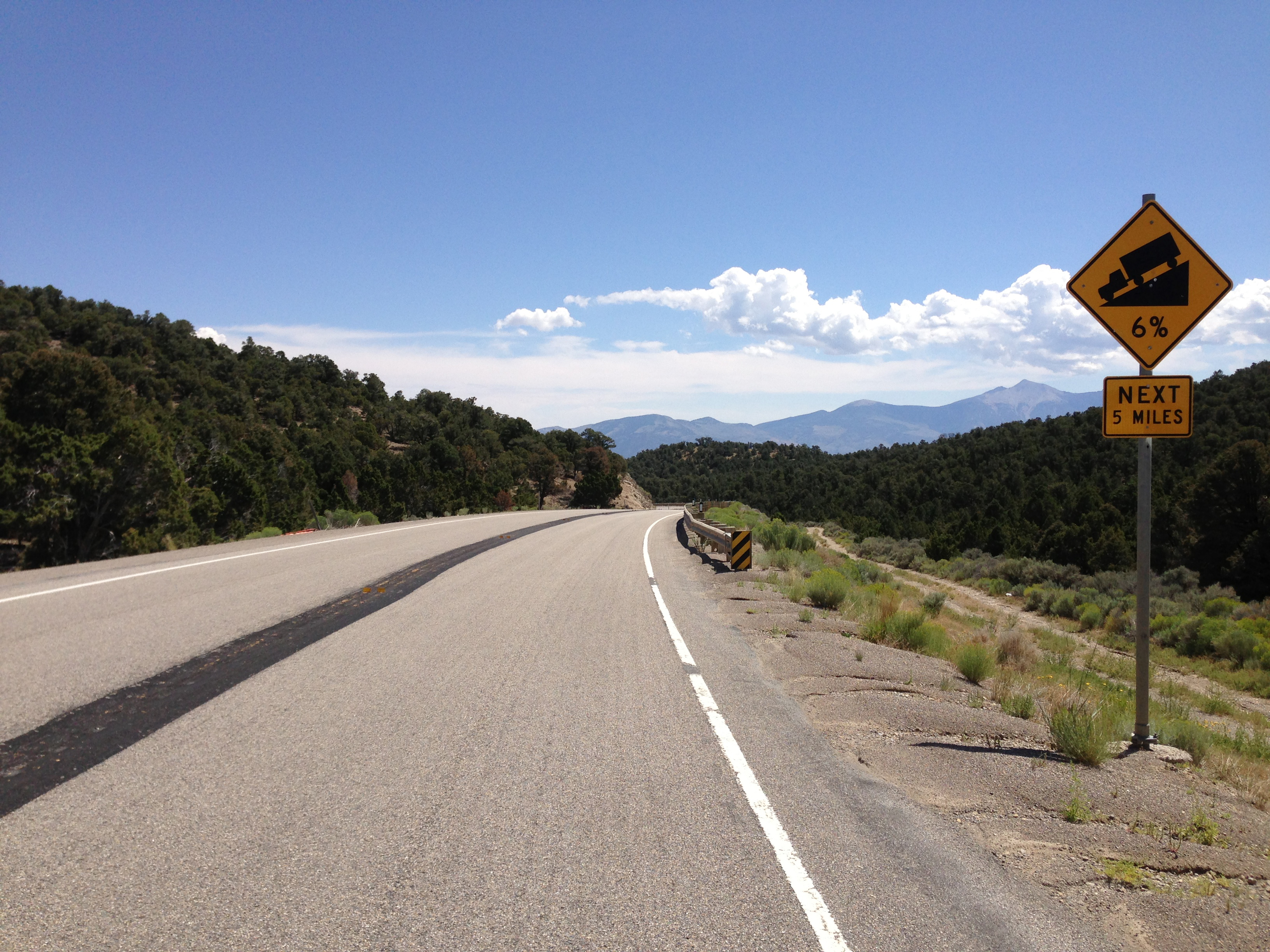
US 6/US 50/US 93 crossing Conners Pass near Ely.

Ely is the last city along US 50 in Nevada. The next city is Delta, Utah, 162 miles (261 km) to the east; there are only two gas stations along the stretch between Ely and Delta. US 93 continues south from the junction with US 50 at Majors Place. At the Nevada–Utah border, the highway passes by Border, Nevada, with a gas station and restaurant.

This portion of the highway is mountainous with the highest point along US 50 in Nevada at Connors Pass at 7,729 feet (2,356 m). This section has been designated a Scenic Byway by the Nevada Scenic Byways program. Listed attractions include the Ward Charcoal Ovens State Historic Park and Great Basin National Park. The highway enters Utah northeast of Baker in a remote portion of the Great Basin Desert.

=== Mountain passes ===
From west to east US 50 crosses several mountain ranges using 17 passes and one tunnel.

| Name | Elevation | Location | Range | Notes |
|---|---|---|---|---|
| Cave Rock Tunnel | 6,260 feet (1,908 m) | Between Zephyr Cove and Glenbrook | Cave Rock (Carson Range) | |
| Spooner Summit | 7,146 feet (2,178 m) | East of SR 28 | Carson Range | |
| Sand Springs Pass | 4,631 feet (1,412 m) | West of SR 839 | Stillwater Range/Sand Springs Range | |
| Drumm Summit | 4,600 feet (1,402 m) | East of SR 121 | Fairview Peak | |
| Westgate | 4,605 feet (1,404 m) | West of SR 361 | Clan Alpine Mountains | |
| Middlegate | 4,605 feet (1,404 m) | East of SR 361 | Clan Alpine Mountains | Eastgate is along an old routing of US 50, now SR 722 |
| New Pass Summit | 6,348 feet (1,935 m) | Lander–Churchill County line | Desatoya Mountains | |
| Mt. Airy | 6,700 feet (2,042 m) | West of Reese River | Shoshone Mountains | |
| Austin Summit | 7,484 feet (2,281 m) | East of Austin | Toiyabe Range | |
| Bob Scott Summit | 7,267 feet (2,215 m) | West of SR 376 | Toiyabe Range | |
| Hickison Summit | 6,546 feet (1,995 m) | East of SR 376 | Toquima Range/Simpson Park Range | |
| Devils Gate | 5,990 feet (1,826 m) | West of Eureka | Mahogany Hills | |
| Pinto Summit | 7,376 feet (2,248 m) | East of Eureka | Diamond Mountains | |
| Pancake Summit | 6,517 feet (1,986 m) | East of SR 892 | Pancake Range | |
| Little Antelope Summit | 7,438 feet (2,267 m) | Near ghost town of Illipah | White Pine Range | |
| Robinson Summit | 7,607 feet (2,319 m) | West of Ely | Egan Range | |
| Connors Pass | 7,729 feet (2,356 m) | West of Majors Place | Schell Creek Range | Highest point along US 50 in Nevada |
| Sacramento Pass | 7,154 feet (2,181 m) | Near ghost town of Osceola | Snake Range | |
Source: Benchmark Maps: Nevada Road and Recreation Atlas

== Cultural references ==
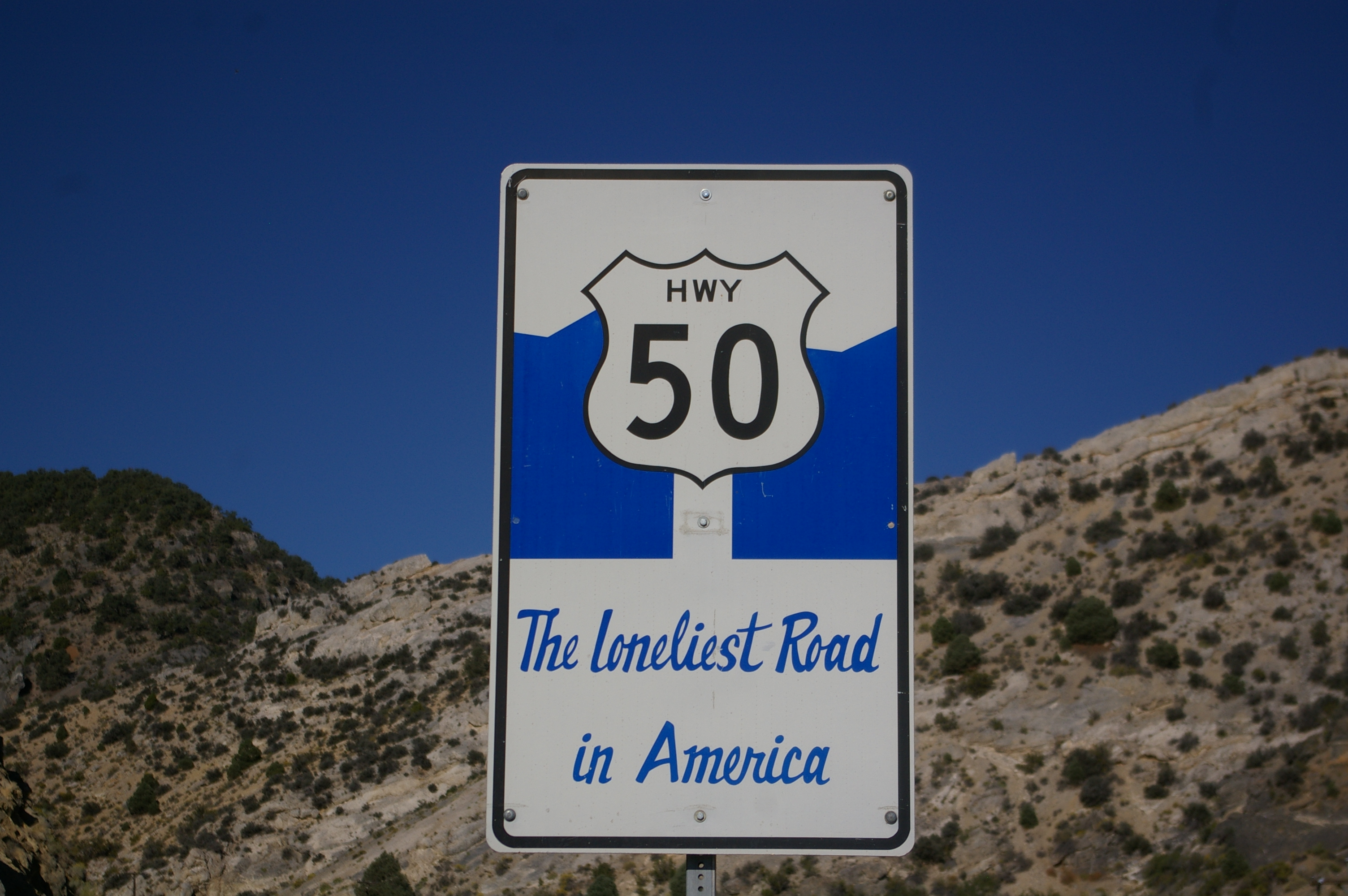
Custom sign placed by the Department of Transportation to promote US 50 as The Loneliest Road in America.

In July 1986, Life magazine published an article (Note: "Route 50: The Loneliest Road in America". Life. July 1986.) that gave US 50 in Nevada the name "The Loneliest Road in America". The article portrayed the highway, and rural Nevada, as a place devoid of civilization. Officials from White Pine County decided to make the best of the publicity generated from the article, and convinced state authorities to do the same. Jointly, they began to use the pejorative article as a platform to market the area for visitors interested in desert scenery, history, and solitude. The Nevada Department of Transportation adopted the name in official highway logs, and placed custom Highway 50 markers along the route.

The Nevada Commission on Tourism sponsors a promotion where visitors can stop at several designated locations along the route and have the passport section of a state issued "survival guide" marked with a stamp representing that location. Visitors can mail in the completed passport and receive a certificate, signed by the Governor, certifying they survived The Loneliest Road in America. The word "survived" is a tongue-in-cheek reference to the Life article, which quoted an American Automobile Association spokesperson as saying, "We warn all motorists not to drive there unless they're confident of their survival skills."

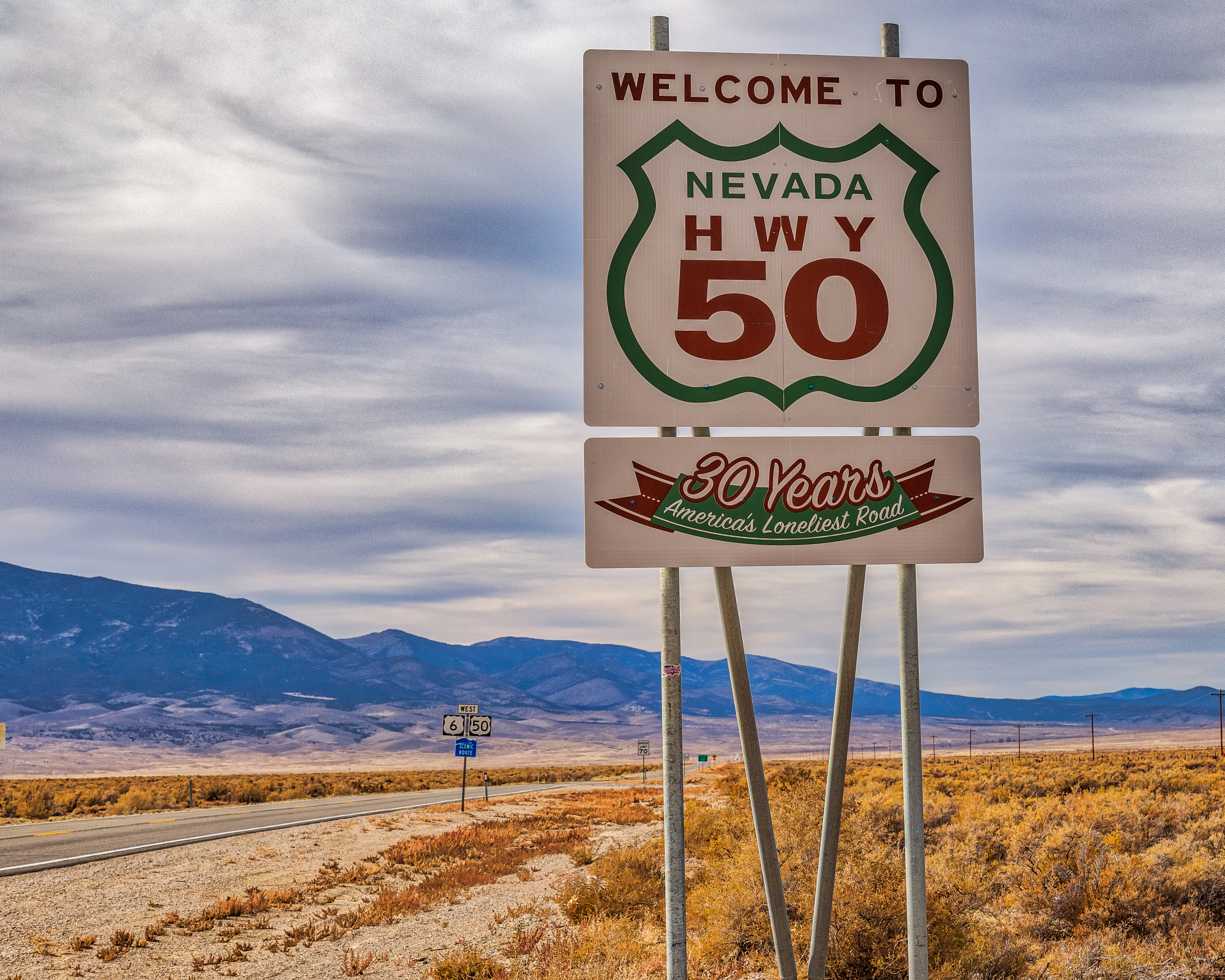
Sign near the Nevada–Utah state line celebrating 30 years of being designated the Loneliest Road in America

Since the article was published, US 50 has gained popularity among people desiring a scenic or less traveled alternative to Interstate 80 across Nevada. This increase in popularity has caused at least one writer to dispute whether US 50 still deserves the title of The Loneliest Road in America. Traffic counts on US 50 are now considerably higher than on US 6, just to the south in Nye County.

The 1971 road movie Vanishing Point, notable for its on-location filming across the southwest United States, used several sections of US 50 as part of the driving sequences. In 1991, Stephen King drove along US 50 as part of a cross country trip. He stopped at Ruth, a small town near Ely. Studying the town, King fantasized about the fate of the residents. King then heard a local legend about how the ghosts of Chinese miners, who died while trapped in a cave-in, can be seen crossing Highway 50 to haunt the city of Ruth. King merged these details into his own story, including references to The Loneliest Road in America, which became the novel Desperation.

In 2002, Neil Peart, then taking a sabbatical from Rush, published Ghost Rider: Travels on the Healing Road, his account of a long-distance motorcycle journey across Canada and the United States. He traveled across US 50 in Nevada, and remarked on the complete absence of any development on long stretches of the road, including a sign reading "No Services for 88 Miles."

In 2008, the British television show Top Gear featured the show's presenters Jeremy Clarkson, Richard Hammond, and James May driving across Nevada along US 50 in the cars of their choice. Clarkson stated he was "mesmerised by the straightness of the road."

== History ==
=== Lincoln Highway ===
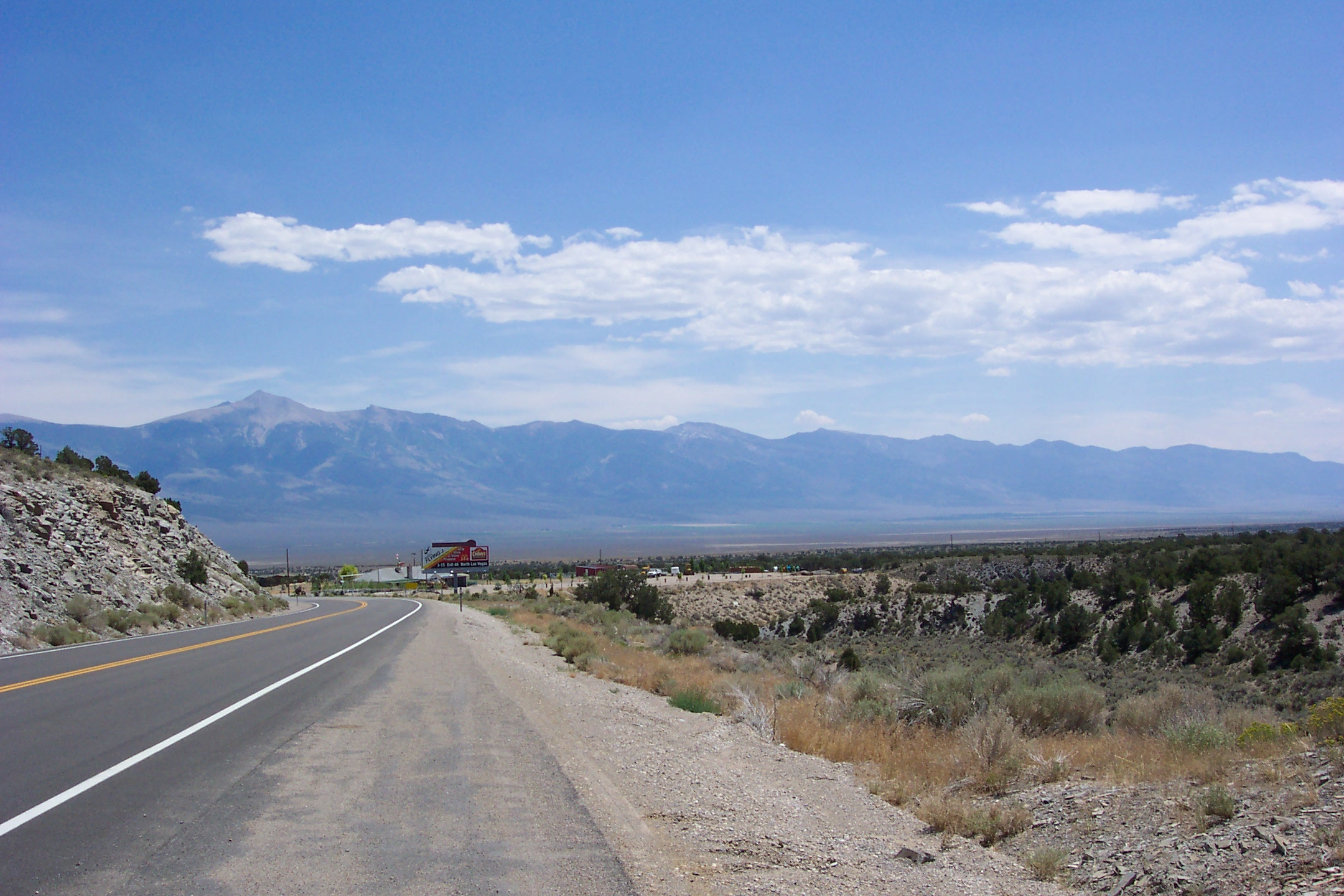
The eastern junction of US 50 and US 93 at Majors Place

In Nevada, US 50 was built mostly along the route of the Lincoln Highway, the first transcontinental highway in the United States, formed in 1913. Through Nevada, the route of the Lincoln Highway had been previously used by the Pony Express, an early attempt at an express mail service, started in 1860. The Pony Express used the technique of riders changing horses at stations approximately 10 miles (16 km) apart to maximize speed. Many of the towns along US 50 originally served as stations along the Pony Express. The original numbered designation of this route, which appeared on Nevada Highway maps as far back as 1919, was State Route 2. Route 2 had an alternate branch, Route 2A, corresponding to a split in the Lincoln Highway near Fallon. The main and alternate branches of Route 2 are reversed from the modern routings of US 50. Mainline Route 2, the Donner Branch, terminated at Fernley along modern US 50 Alternate. State Route 2A, the Pioneer Branch, followed mainline US 50, terminating at Carson City. State Route 2, and the Lincoln Highway, used a different routing between Ely and Salt Lake City, Utah from the modern routes. The original routing used what is now US 93 from Ely to the ghost town of Schellbourne and then dirt roads towards Tooele, Utah.

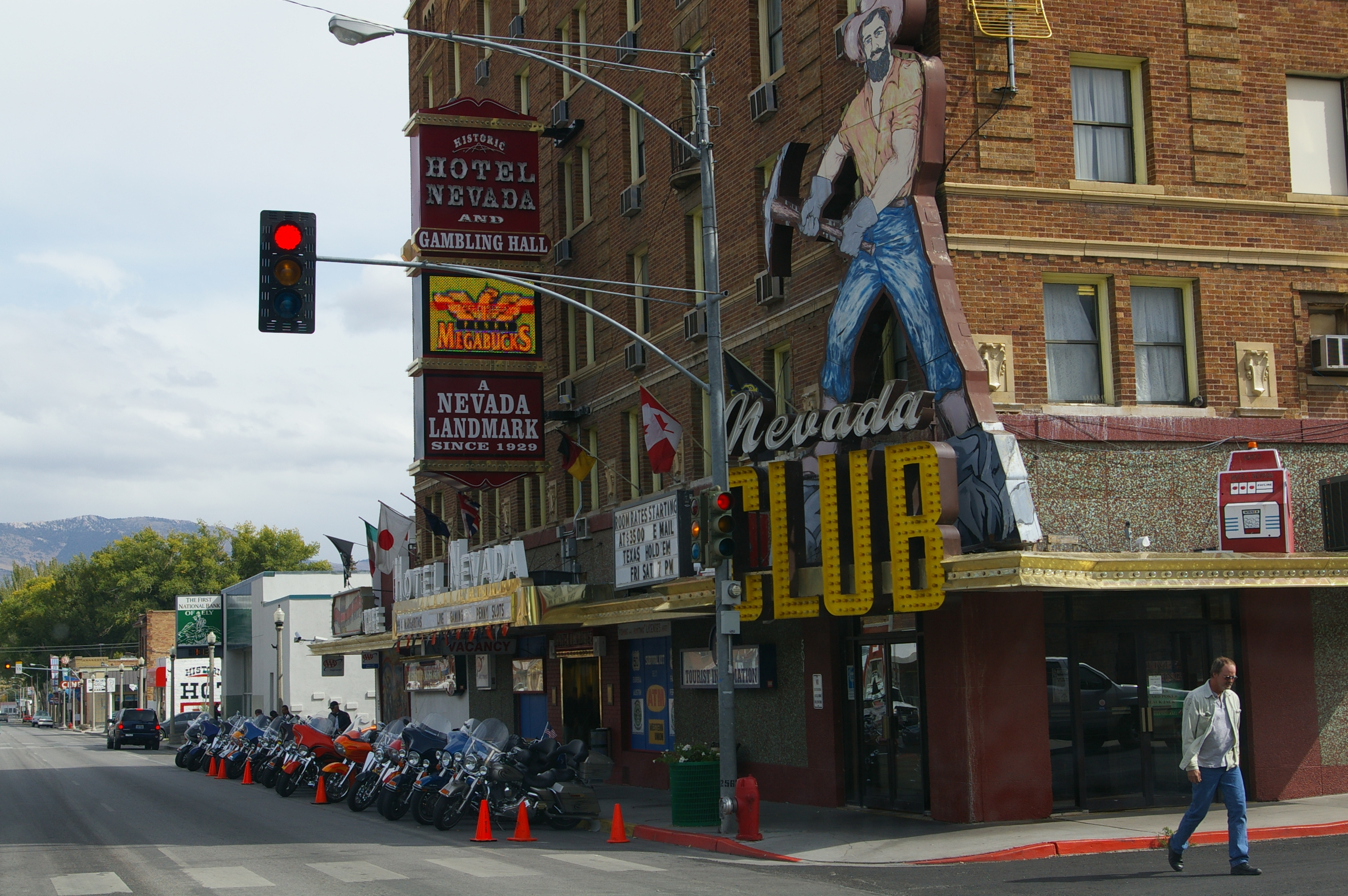
Downtown Ely

In 1926, when the U.S. Highway system was announced, there was a gap in US 50 between Ely and Thistle, Utah. At the time, the states of Utah and Nevada were feuding about which of the old auto trails would be paved and used for the new U.S. Highway system. Utah officials refused to pave the portion of the Lincoln Highway west of Salt Lake City. They perceived this route as being expensive to build, with no benefit for the state. Nevada officials, and the Lincoln Highway Association, pleaded with Utah authorities to change their position, even offering funds to help offset the additional cost of paving that route. However, the Lincoln highway directed travelers destined for both southern and northern California on a route away from Utah cities, towards central Nevada. Utah instead paved the Wendover Cutoff, part of the Victory Highway (modern Interstate 80), that only directed traffic for northern California out of the state. The choice not to pave the Lincoln Highway would direct travelers bound for southern California to use the Arrowhead Trail (modern Interstate 15). This route serves numerous communities in Utah, but only Las Vegas and a few other small towns in Nevada. The final blow to the original route of the Lincoln Highway was the formation of the Dugway Proving Ground, a military base used for weapons testing, which closed the area to the public. The Lincoln Highway was re-routed to Salt Lake City along a circuitous route via Wendover and the Bonneville Salt Flats. This route was initially numbered US 50 from Ely to Wendover and US 40/50 across western Utah, but has been renumbered US 93, US 93 Alternate and I-80.

=== Route changes ===
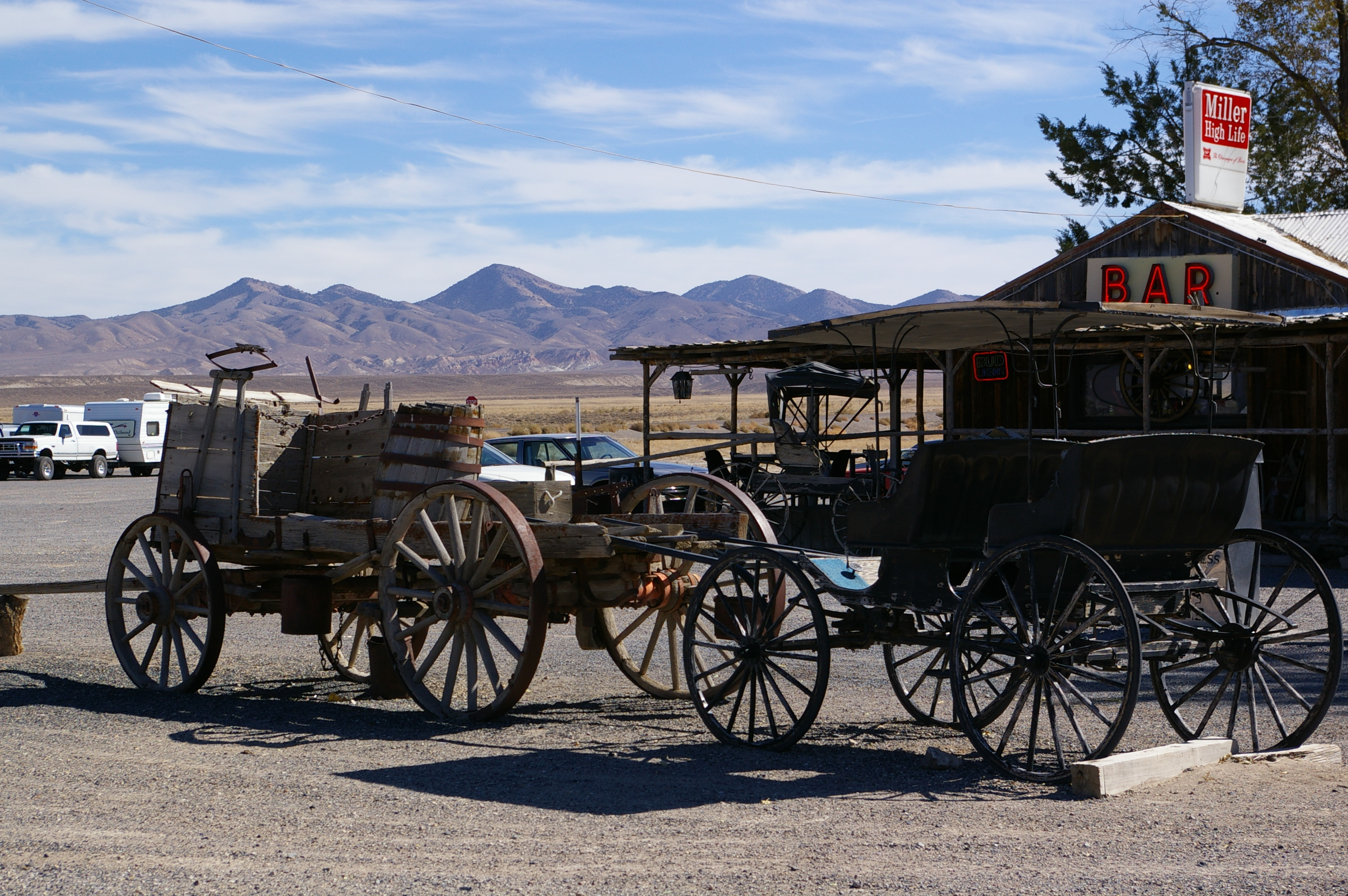
The Middlegate roadhouse

Most of modern US 50 was pieced together from several routes designated as Nevada State Routes in the early 20th century. The portion from Lake Tahoe to Carson City was originally a portion of State Route 3. The original designation for US 50 from Carson City to Ely was Route 2 and 2A. East of Ely was originally numbered Route 7 to the modern junction with US 93 and Route 14 from there to the Utah state line. The modern route of US 50 has significantly changed since the highway was first commissioned in 1926. The biggest change is between Ely and Green River, Utah. The first contiguous route of the highway between these cities followed the modified routing of the Lincoln Highway to Salt Lake City. The highway returned to Green River along what is now numbered UT 201, US 89, and US 6. The route was changed when the more direct route between these cities (via Delta, Utah) was paved. The 1954 edition of the Nevada highway map was the first to show the new routing.

Previously, the road to Delta consisted of unpaved state routes. The paved route did not follow the exact route of the old dirt roads. The improved route bypassed the ghost town of Osceola and entered Utah approximately 14 miles (23 km) to the south of the dirt road. The border crossing was moved to facilitate an easier route across western Utah. In Utah, the old road traversed a difficult route through Marjum Canyon, while the paved route followed a simpler path along the north shore of Sevier Lake.

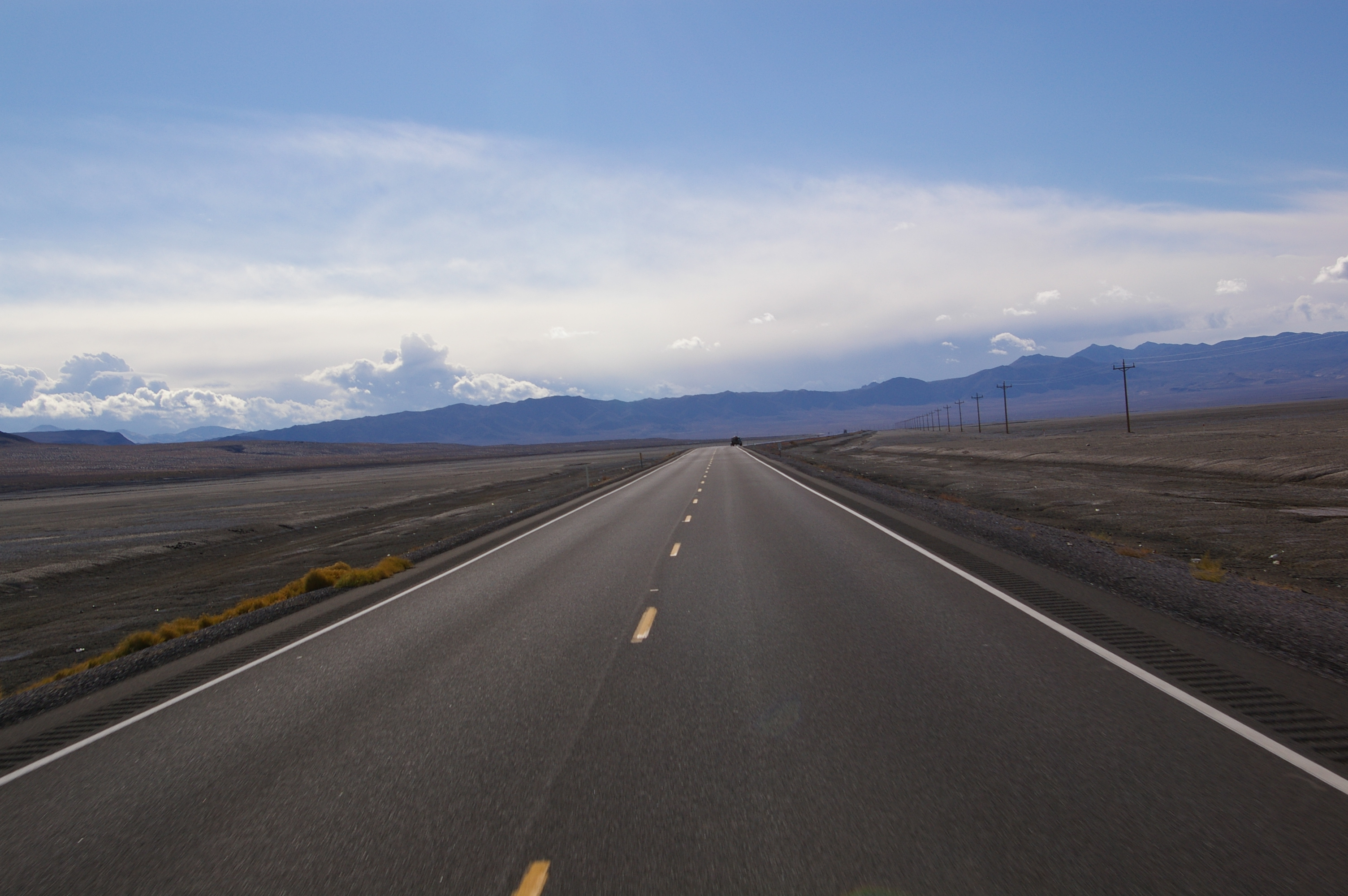
Salt Wells, just east of Fallon

Three different routes have existed between Lake Tahoe and Carson City. The original, used by the Lincoln Highway, was previously known as Johnson's Cutoff or the Carson Ridge Emigrant Road. This route, which followed Kings Canyon to scale the Sierra Nevada, was severely damaged by a flood in 1997. The U.S. Forest Service still promotes this road for its historical value, but has announced that it will no longer be maintained and travel is only recommended by foot, horse, or four wheel drive vehicle. A portion in the lower part of the canyon inside Carson City limits was maintained by the state as Kings Canyon Road (SR 512) until 2009. In 1923, while still known as State Route 3, the road to Lake Tahoe was changed to follow Clear Creek Canyon, along a path that had been used for a series of tunnels and flumes, to transport timber from Lake Tahoe to the Virginia and Truckee Railroad depot in Carson City. The iteration is now known as Old Clear Creek Road. Only a small portion of Old Clear Creek Road is currently maintained by the state as unsigned SR 705, the remainder is an access road for private residences in the canyon. The modern route, also using Clear Creek Canyon, was built in the late 1950s.

US 50 was rerouted through the eastern half of Fallon. The original route is not drivable as it runs through Naval Air Station Fallon; portions are still in public use as Harrigan Road (SR 115) and Berney Road (SR 119). Around 1967, US 50 was improved between Middlegate and Austin, to bypass steep grades and sharp curves over Carroll Summit. The original route is now SR 722. In 2017, US 50 was re-aligned onto the completed Interstate 580 bypass, replacing its former route through downtown Carson City.

== Major intersections ==
Note: Mileposts in Nevada reset at county lines. The start and end mileposts in each county are given in the county column.

| County | Location | mi | km | Destinations | Notes |
|---|---|---|---|---|---|
| Douglas; DO 0.000–14.601 | Stateline | 0.0 | 0.0 | US 50 west – South Lake Tahoe | Continuation into California |
| Douglas; DO 0.000–14.601 | Stateline | 0.639 | 1.028 | SR 207 east (Kingsbury Grade) – Gardnerville, Minden | |
| Douglas; DO 0.000–14.601 | Round Hill Village | 1.9 | 3.1 | SR 760 west – Nevada Beach | |
| Douglas; DO 0.000–14.601 | Lakeridge | | | Cave Rock Tunnel | |
| Douglas; DO 0.000–14.601 | | 12.106 | 19.483 | SR 28 north – Incline Village, Lake Tahoe – Nevada State Park | |
| City of Carson City; CC 0.000–15.728; 0.000-4.097 (Note: Mileposts reflect distance along I-580 where concurrent) | | 7.502 0.000 | 12.073 0.000 | US 395 south / US 395 Bus. north (S. Carson Street) – Minden, Gardnerville I-580 begins | Western end of freeway; western end of I-580/US 395 concurrency; mileposts reflect distance along I-580 |
| City of Carson City; CC 0.000–15.728; 0.000-4.097 | | 3.146 | 5.063 | Fairview Drive | I-580 exit 3 |
| City of Carson City; CC 0.000–15.728; 0.000-4.097 | | 4.097 11.599 | 6.593 18.667 | I-580 north / US 395 north – Reno | Eastern end of freeway; eastern end of I-580/US 395 concurrency; I-580 exit 5; surface road continues as William Street; mileposts resume US 50 distance |
| Lyon; LY 0.000–35.388 | Moundhouse | 2.065 | 3.323 | SR 341 north – Virginia City | |
| Lyon; LY 0.000–35.388 | Dayton | 5.614 | 9.035 | Dayton Valley Road (SR 822 east) | |
| Lyon; LY 0.000–35.388 | Silver Springs | 26.8 | 43.1 | SR 439 north (USA Parkway) to I-80 / Opal Avenue – Tahoe Reno Industrial Center | |
| Lyon; LY 0.000–35.388 | Silver Springs | 29.192 | 46.980 | US 50 Alt. east / US 95 Alt. – Fernley, Yerington | |
| Churchill; CH 0.00–106.963 | Leeteville Junction | 11.201 | 18.026 | US 50 Alt. west – Fernley, Reno | Proposed interchange as part of I-11 extension |
| Churchill; CH 0.00–106.963 | Fallon | 15.106 | 24.311 | SR 117 east (Sheckler Road) | |
| Churchill; CH 0.00–106.963 | Fallon | 16.142 | 25.978 | SR 723 north – Soda Lake | |
| Churchill; CH 0.00–106.963 | Fallon | 16.391 | 26.379 | McLean Lane (SR 715 south) | |
| Churchill; CH 0.00–106.963 | Fallon | 20.326 | 32.712 | US 95 south – Las Vegas | Western end of US 95 concurrency |
| Churchill; CH 0.00–106.963 | Fallon | 20.571 | 33.106 | US 95 north – Winnemucca | Eastern end of US 95 concurrency |
| Churchill; CH 0.00–106.963 | Fallon | 21.334 | 34.334 | SR 115 south (Harrigan Road) – Naval Air Station Fallon | |
| Churchill; CH 0.00–106.963 | Fallon | 25.488 | 41.019 | SR 116 east – Stillwater National Wildlife Refuge | |
| Churchill; CH 0.00–106.963 | | 52.5 | 84.5 | Nevada Scheelite Mine Road (SR 839 south) | |
| Churchill; CH 0.00–106.963 | | 60.731 | 97.737 | Dixie Valley Road | Former SR 121 north |
| Churchill; CH 0.00–106.963 | Middlegate | 68.437 | 110.139 | SR 361 south to US 95 – Gabbs | |
| Churchill; CH 0.00–106.963 | | 71.856 | 115.641 | SR 722 east | Former US 50 east |
| Lander; LA 0.00–56.740 | | 21.331 | 34.329 | SR 722 west – Gold Venture, Ione, Reese River | Former US 50 west |
| Lander; LA 0.00–56.740 | Austin | 23.606 | 37.990 | SR 305 north – Battle Mountain | |
| Lander; LA 0.00–56.740 | | 35.489 | 57.114 | SR 376 south – Round Mountain, Tonopah | |
| Eureka; EU 0.00–47.340 | | 35.337 | 56.869 | SR 278 north – Carlin | |
| Eureka; EU 0.00–47.340 | Eureka | 37.926 | 61.036 | Eureka Mine Road | Former SR 780 west |
| White Pine; WP 0.00–68.43; 37.96–101.88 (Note: Mileposts east of Ely reflect distance along concurrent US 6.) | | 4.4 | 7.1 | Strawberry Road (SR 892 north) | |
| White Pine; WP 0.00–68.43; 37.96–101.88 | Ely | 66.45 | 106.94 | US 93 north – McGill, Twin Falls | Western end of US 93 concurrency |
| White Pine; WP 0.00–68.43; 37.96–101.88 | Ely | 68.43 37.96 | 110.13 61.09 | US 6 west – Lund Junction, Tonopah | Western end of US 6 concurrency; mileposts reflect distance along US 6 |
| White Pine; WP 0.00–68.43; 37.96–101.88 | Majors Place | 63.483 | 102.166 | US 93 south – Pioche, Las Vegas | Eastern end of US 93 concurrency |
| White Pine; WP 0.00–68.43; 37.96–101.88 | | 65.6 | 105.6 | Spring Valley Road (SR 893 north) | |
| White Pine; WP 0.00–68.43; 37.96–101.88 | | 93.824 | 150.995 | SR 487 east – Baker, Lehman Caves, Great Basin National Park | |
| White Pine; WP 0.00–68.43; 37.96–101.88 | Border | 101.331 | 163.076 | US 6 east / US 50 east – Delta | Continuation into Utah |
1.000 mi = 1.609 km; 1.000 km = 0.621 mi: Concurrency terminus

== See also ==
- Reno Arch, marker celebrating the completion of the Lincoln Highway in Nevada

Other geographic features traversed by the highway

- Antelope Valley (Eureka County)
- Big Smoky Valley
- Newark Valley (Nevada)
- Snake Valley (Great Basin)
- Spring Valley Wind Farm
- Steptoe Valley

Related routes

- U.S. Route 50 Alternate
- State Route 2B, former spur of US 50 (as State Route 2A), no longer part of the state highway system
- State Route 2C, former spur of State Route 2A, no longer part of the state highway system

== Notes ==
U.S. Route 50
| Previous state: California | Nevada | Next state: Utah |

Lincoln Highway
| Previous state: California | Nevada | Next state: Utah |
