= Desatoya Mountains =

Mountain range in Nevada, U.S.

- Location within Nevada

Highest point
- Peak: Desatoya Peak
- Elevation: 3,041 m (9,977 ft)
- Coordinates: 39°21′55″N 117°45′33″W

Geography
- Country: United States
- State: Nevada
- District(s): Churchill and Lander counties
- Range coordinates: 39°25′28″N 117°40′3″W
- Topo map: USGS Basque Summit

The Desatoya Mountains are located in central Nevada in the western United States, approximately 117 miles east of Reno by road. The range runs in a southwest-northeasterly direction along the border of Churchill and Lander counties, reaching a maximum elevation of 9,978 feet (3,041 m) (3041 m) at Desatoya Peak near Rock Creek Canyon.

== Geography ==
The range is separated from the Paradise Range in the south by Burnt Cabin Summit at the Nye County line, near the sites of Chalk Wells and Phonolite, and from the New Pass Range in the north by New Pass along U.S. Route 50. It is traversed by three routes:

=== Trans mountain navigation ===
- The Old Overland Road between Smith Creek Valley and Edwards Creek Valley crosses the northern end of the range by way of Basque Summit at an elevation of 7,625 feet following the Pony Express route.
- Nevada State Highway 722 crosses the range to the south by way of Carroll Summit at an elevation of 7,425 feet.
- The third route splits off of Highway 722 approximately three miles east of Eastgate, heading southeast along Buffalo Creek, and crosses the range over Buffalo Summit (south of Carroll Summit) at an elevation of 7,021 feet. This road eventually reaches the former Nye county seat of Ione by way of Phonolite.

== History ==
The Desatoya Mountains set the backdrop for both the Cold Springs and Smith Creek Pony Express stations; the Cold Springs Pony Express Station and the Pony Express National Historic Trail lie at the western edge of the range, whereas the Smith Creek Pony Express Station is situated at the eastern base on the edge of Smith Creek Valley.

== The etymology of the name Desatoya ==
The precise morphology and etymology of the name Desatoya is unclear: whereas ...'toya' derives from the Shoshone word toyap (mountain), 'desa'... has been multifariously interpreted as 'short, low,' 'big-black,' and 'cold.'

Early documents record the range's name variously as the Lookout Range or the Sedaye Mountains, sedaye purportedly being an Indian word meaning 'no good.'
