= Nevada State Route 121 =

Former state highway in Nevada, United States

State Route 121
- Dixie Valley Road
- Nevada State Route 121, highlighted in red.

Route information
- Maintained by NDOT
- Length: 27.047 mi (43.528 km)
- Existed: 1976–2022

Major junctions
- South end: US 50 east of Fallon
- North end: Settlement Road in Dixie Valley

Location
- Country: United States
- State: Nevada
- County: Churchill

Highway system
- Nevada State Highway System; Interstate; US; State; Pre‑1976; Scenic

State Route 121 (SR 121) was a state highway in Churchill County, Nevada. It spurred from U.S. Route 50, east of Fallon, north 27.047 miles (43.528 km) to a local road, Settlement Road in Dixie Valley, with the moniker of Dixie Valley Road. SR 121 was assigned in 1976 and removed from the primary state highway system in 2022, with the entire length of the route being redesignated as Frontage Road FRCH08.

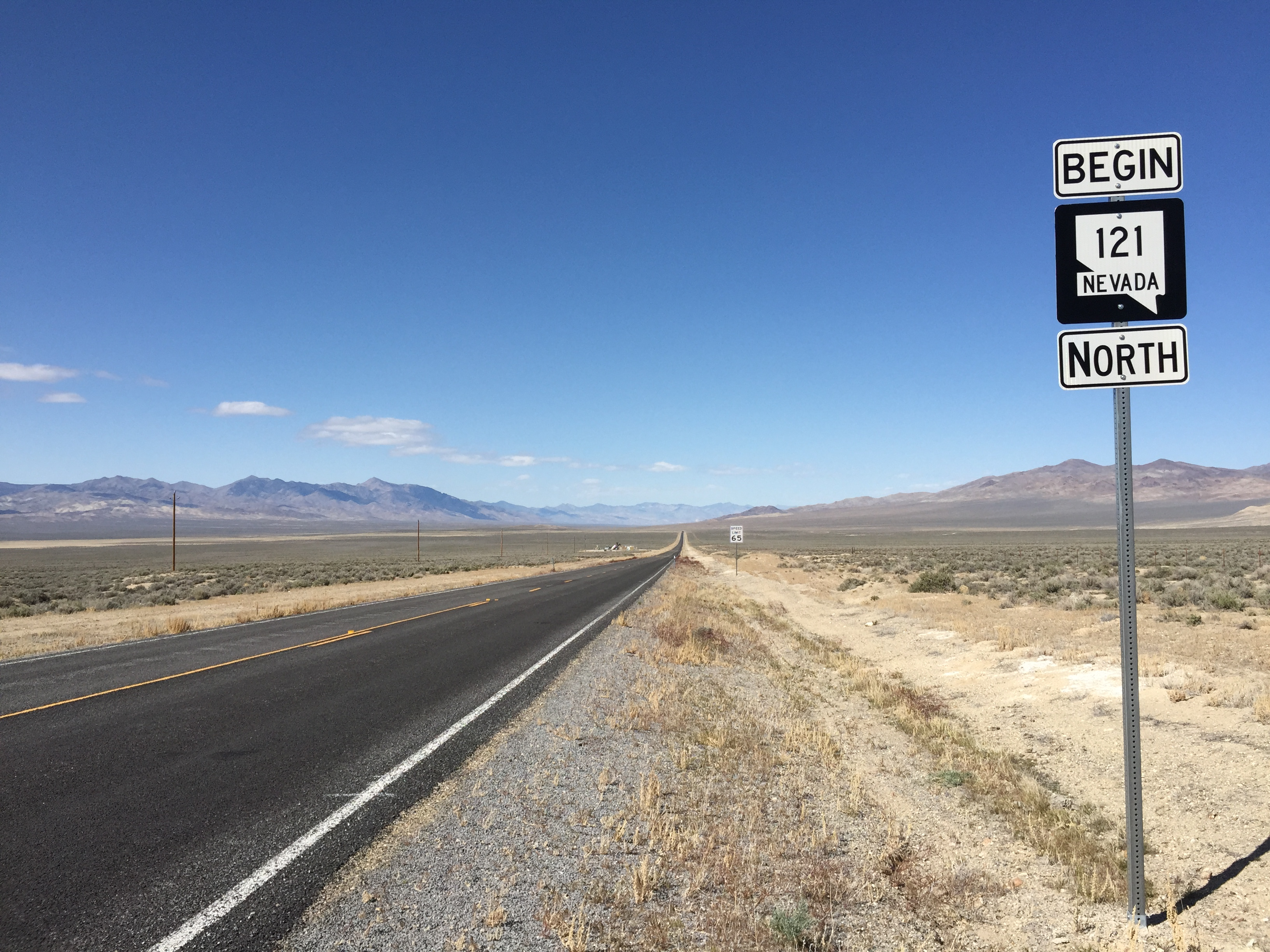
View from the south end of SR 121 looking northbound in April 2015

== Route description ==
State Route 121 began at an intersection with U.S. Route 50 (the Austin Highway) to the east of the community of Fallon. Route 121 progressed northward through the United States Naval Recreation and Training Area just to the north of Route 50. The route progressed northward, through the mountains of Churchill County. The highway left the Recreation Area and continued its way to the community of Dixie Valley. The route continued northward for about 20 miles (32 km) and intersected with Settlement Road in Dixie Valley, where the state designation ended. Dixie Valley Road continued on as a gravel road.

== History ==
After many years of minimal use, NDOT removed the asphalt surface and replaced it with gravel in 2021. It was removed from the primary state highway system by January 2022.

== Major intersections ==
The entire route was in Churchill County.

Location	mi	km	Destinations	Notes
	0.000	0.000	US 50 – Fallon, Austin	Former southern terminus
Dixie Valley	27.047	43.528	Settlement Road	Former northern terminus
Dixie Valley	27.047	43.528	Dixie Valley Road north	Continuation beyond former northern terminus
1.000 mi = 1.609 km; 1.000 km = 0.621 mi
