= Nevada State Route 893 =

Highway in Nevada

State Route 893
- Spring Valley Road
- SR 893 highlighted in red

Route information
- Maintained by NDOT
- Length: 39.753 mi (63.976 km)

Major junctions
- South end: US 6 / US 50 near Majors Place
- North end: Muncy Creek

Location
- Country: United States
- State: Nevada
- Counties: White Pine

Highway system
- Nevada State Highway System; Interstate; US; State; Pre‑1976; Scenic
← SR 892	→ SR 894

State Route 893 is a state highway in White Pine County, Nevada. The highway follows Spring Valley Road from U.S. Routes 6 and 50 for 39.75 miles (63.97 km) north to its terminus at the end of pavement near Muncy Creek.

== Major intersections ==
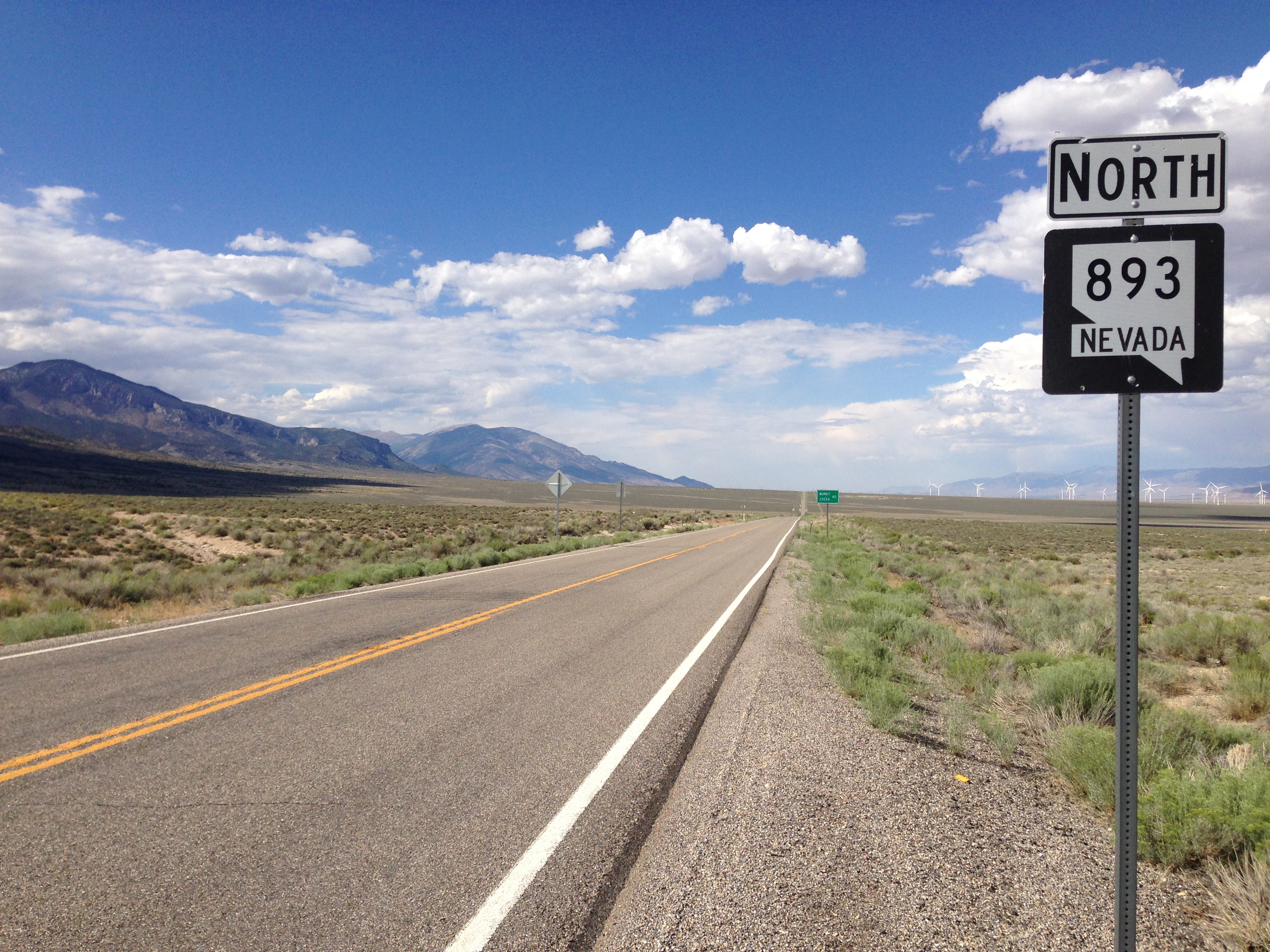
View north from the south end of SR 893

The entire route is in White Pine County.

Location	mi	km	Destinations	Notes
	0.000	0.000	US 6 / US 50 – Baker, Ely	Southern terminus
Muncy Creek	39.753	63.976	Northern terminus; continuation beyond northern terminus	
1.000 mi = 1.609 km; 1.000 km = 0.621 mi: Route transition
