= Spooner Summit =

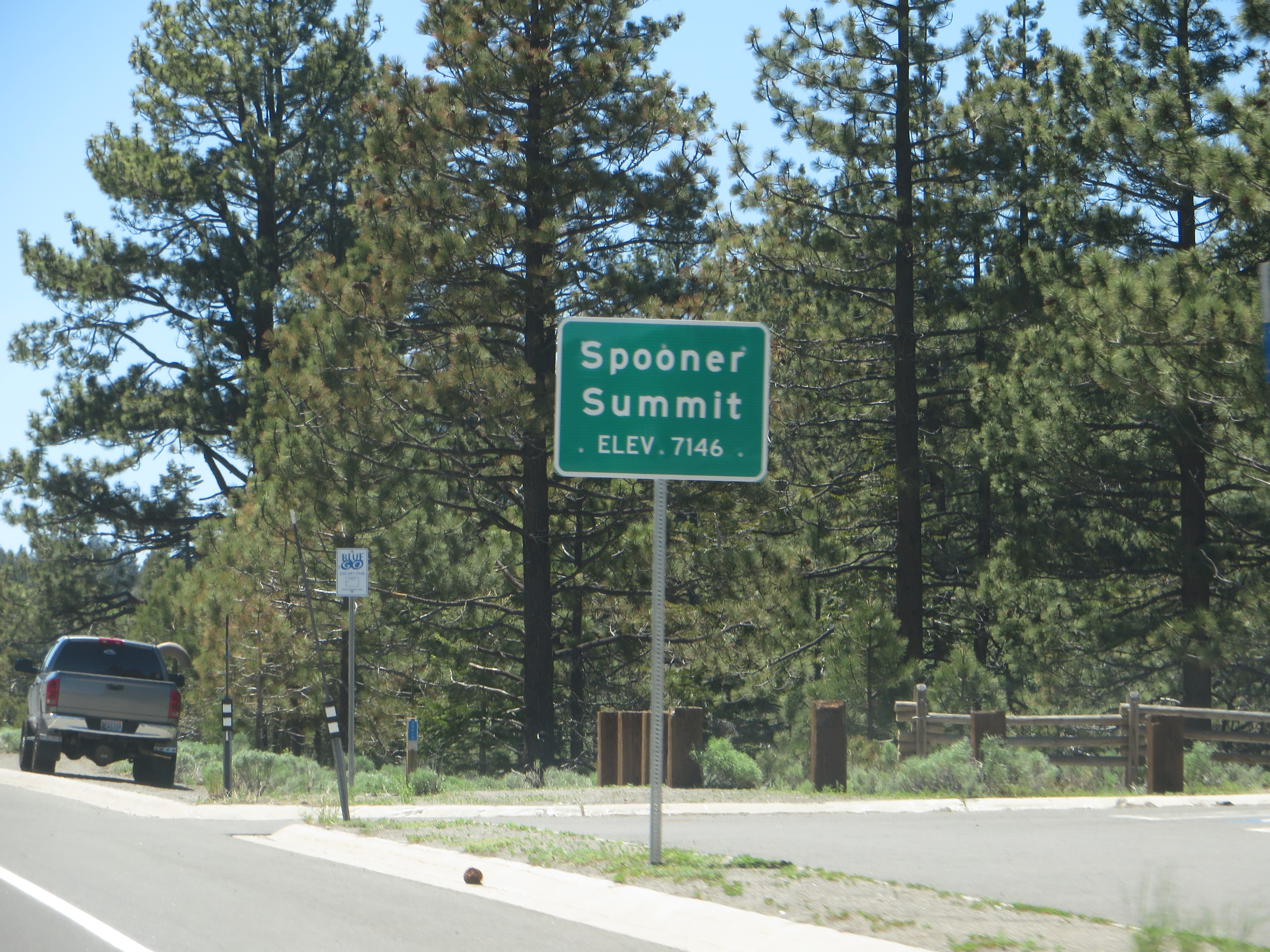
- Interactive map of Spooner Summit
- Elevation: 7,146 feet (2,178 m)
- Traversed by: US 50

Third Approach
- Location: Douglas County, Nevada
- Range: Carson Range
- Coordinates: 39.104233°N 119.897158°W

Spooner Summit is a mountain pass through the Carson Range, linking the Lake Tahoe Area to Carson City via US 50. The highest point of the pass is located just east of Spooner Lake just before the first set of curves when traveling eastbound.

The pass also carried the Lincoln Highway over the Carson Range along its Sierra Nevada Southern Route before being renumbered as US 50 and rerouted near Johnson Pass.

The Tahoe Rim Trail is accessible from a small parking lot at the summit.
