= Hickison Petroglyph Recreation Area =

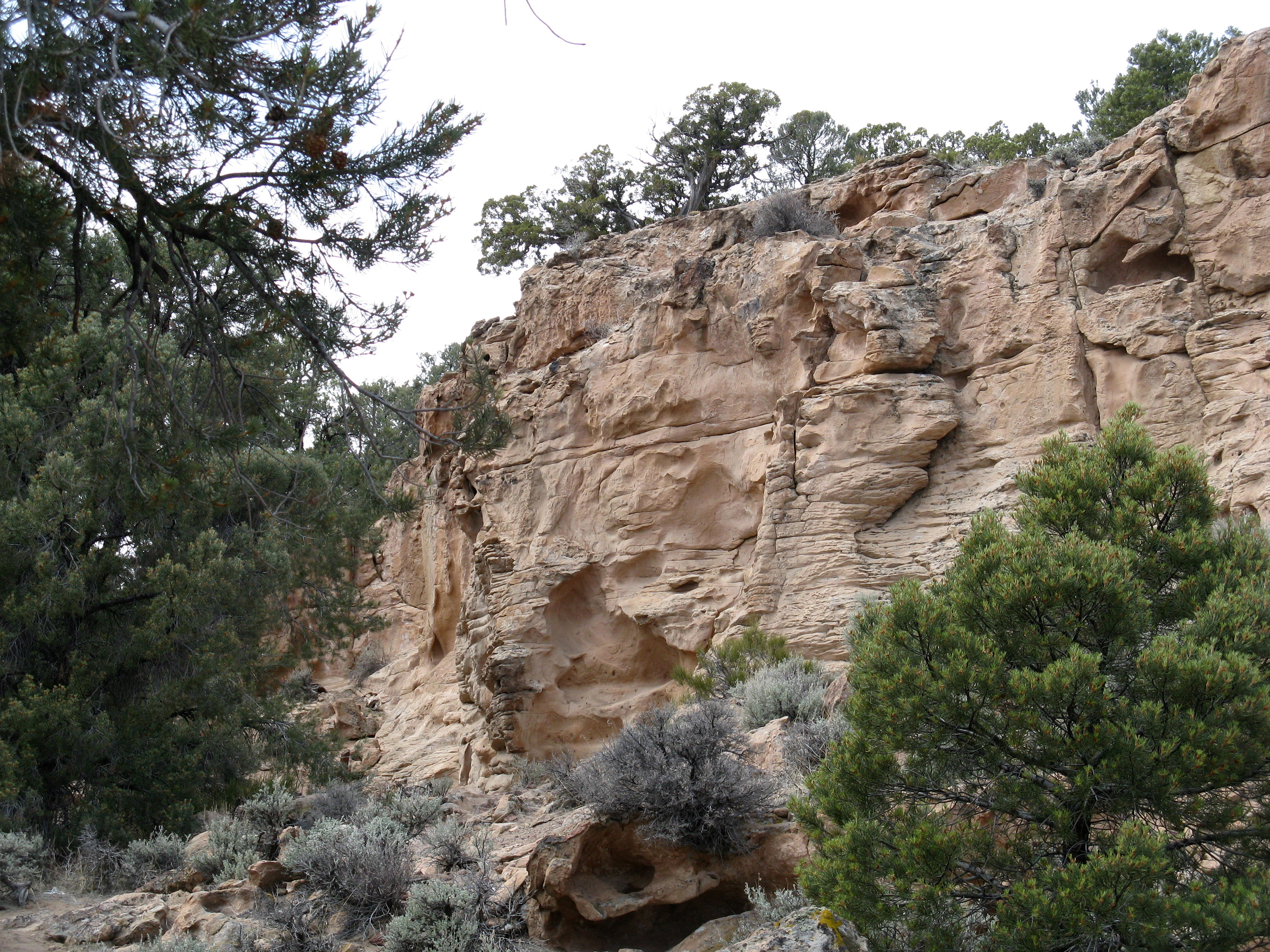
- Cliff face along the self-guided trail
- Interactive map of Hickison Petroglyph Recreation Area
- Type: Public, Federal
- Location: Lander County, Nevada, United States
- Nearest city: Austin
- Coordinates: 39°26′37″N 116°44′47″W
- Elevation: 6,500 feet (2,000 m)
- Operator: Bureau of Land Management
- Open: Year-round

The Hickison Petroglyph Recreation Area provides public access to petroglyphs created by prehistoric people living near Hickison Summit at the north end of the Toquima Range and the south end of the Simpson Park Mountains in the U.S. state of Nevada. The recreation area, maintained by the Bureau of Land Management, is 24 miles (39 km) east of Austin along U.S. Route 50. The site, at 6,500 feet (2,000 m) above sea level, is on the west edge of the Monitor Valley in the Great Basin.

The park features a self-guided tour along a 0.5-mile (0.8 km) trail with multiple petroglyph panels, high-desert flora, and views of the Toquima and Toiyabe mountain ranges and the Big Smoky Valley. Amenities include 16 campsites, a day-use area, toilets, grills, picnic tables, and trash cans but no water.

== Name ==
Hickison Summit is named for ranch owner John Hickerson. (Hickerson is an alternate spelling for the summit.) The road to the Hickerson ranch passes over the summit.

== History ==
In the general vicinity of Hickison Summit are multiple prehistoric hunting and living sites dating to 10,000 B.C. as well as more recent sites such as mining camps and ranches. Trails used by mid-19th-century explorers John C. Frémont and James H. Simpson pass through the area as do the routes of the Pony Express and the Overland Stage. At the time of the earliest prehistoric sites, the Great Basin contained large lakes, including Lake Toiyabe and Lake Tonopah in the Big Smoky Valley west of the summit. As the climate became drier, the lakes evaporated, and the former lake-dependent cultures were replaced by hunter-gatherers. When the first European-Americans arrived in about 1850, Western Shoshone people lived in the region.
