= Nevada State Route 722 =

State highway in Nevada, United States

State Route 722
- Carroll Summit Road
- SR 722 highlighted in red

Route information
- Maintained by Nevada DOT
- Length: 58.139 mi (93.566 km)
- Existed: 1976–present

Major junctions
- West end: US 50 near Middlegate
- East end: US 50 near Austin

Location
- Country: United States
- State: Nevada

Highway system
- Nevada State Highway System; Interstate; US; State; Pre‑1976; Scenic
← SR 720	→ SR 723

State Route 722 (SR 722) is a 58.139-mile-long (93.566 km) state highway in Churchill County and Lander County in the U.S. state of Nevada. The highway is an old routing of U.S. Route 50 (US 50), and previously the Lincoln Highway. What is now route 722 crosses the Desatoya Mountains via Carroll Summit. The US 50 designation was removed from this alignment in favor of the modern route that traverses the Desatoya Mountains via New Pass Summit, which is 1,100 feet (340 m) lower and with an easier approach on both sides than Carroll Summit.

== Route description ==
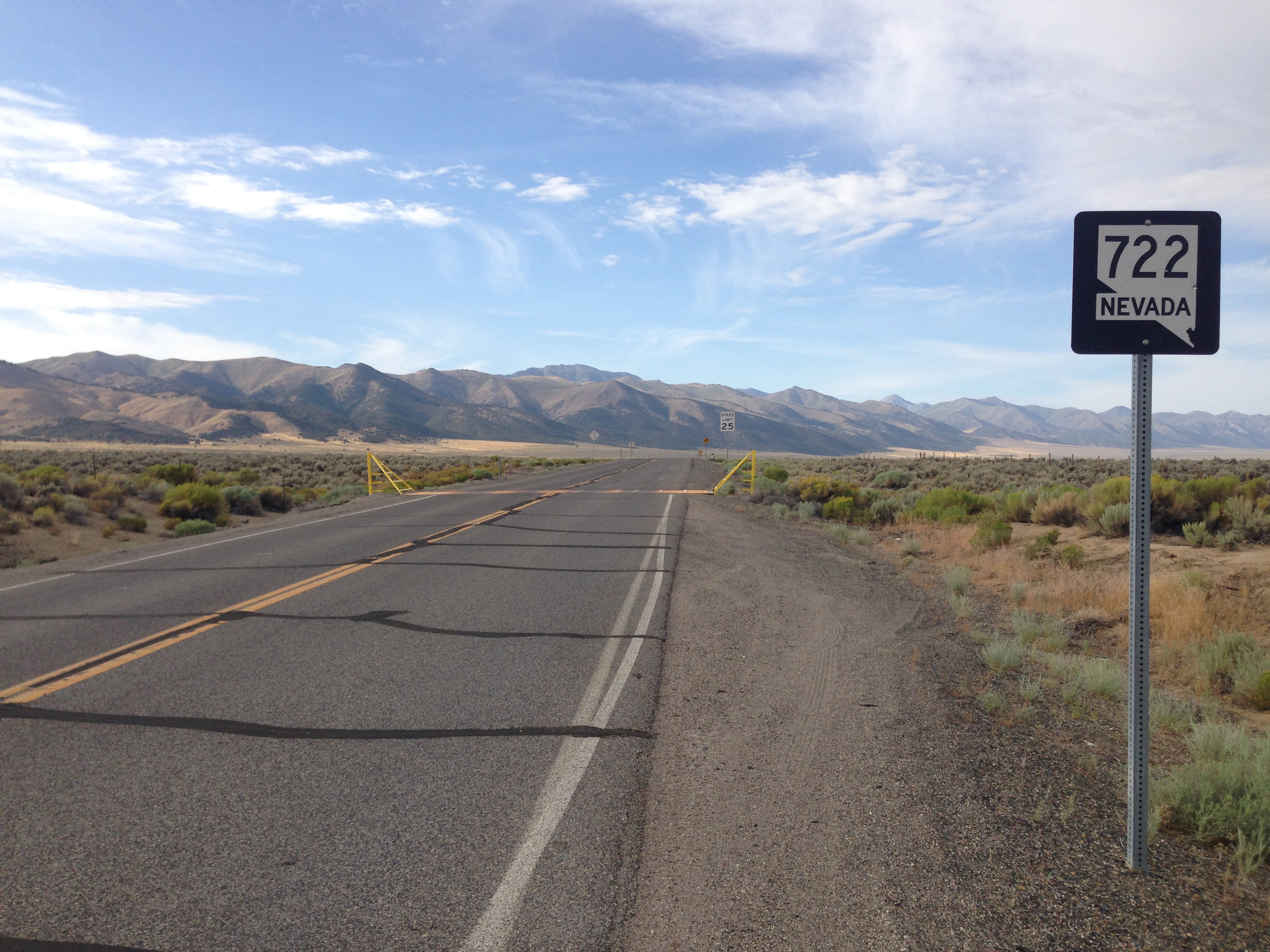
First reassurance sign along westbound SR 722

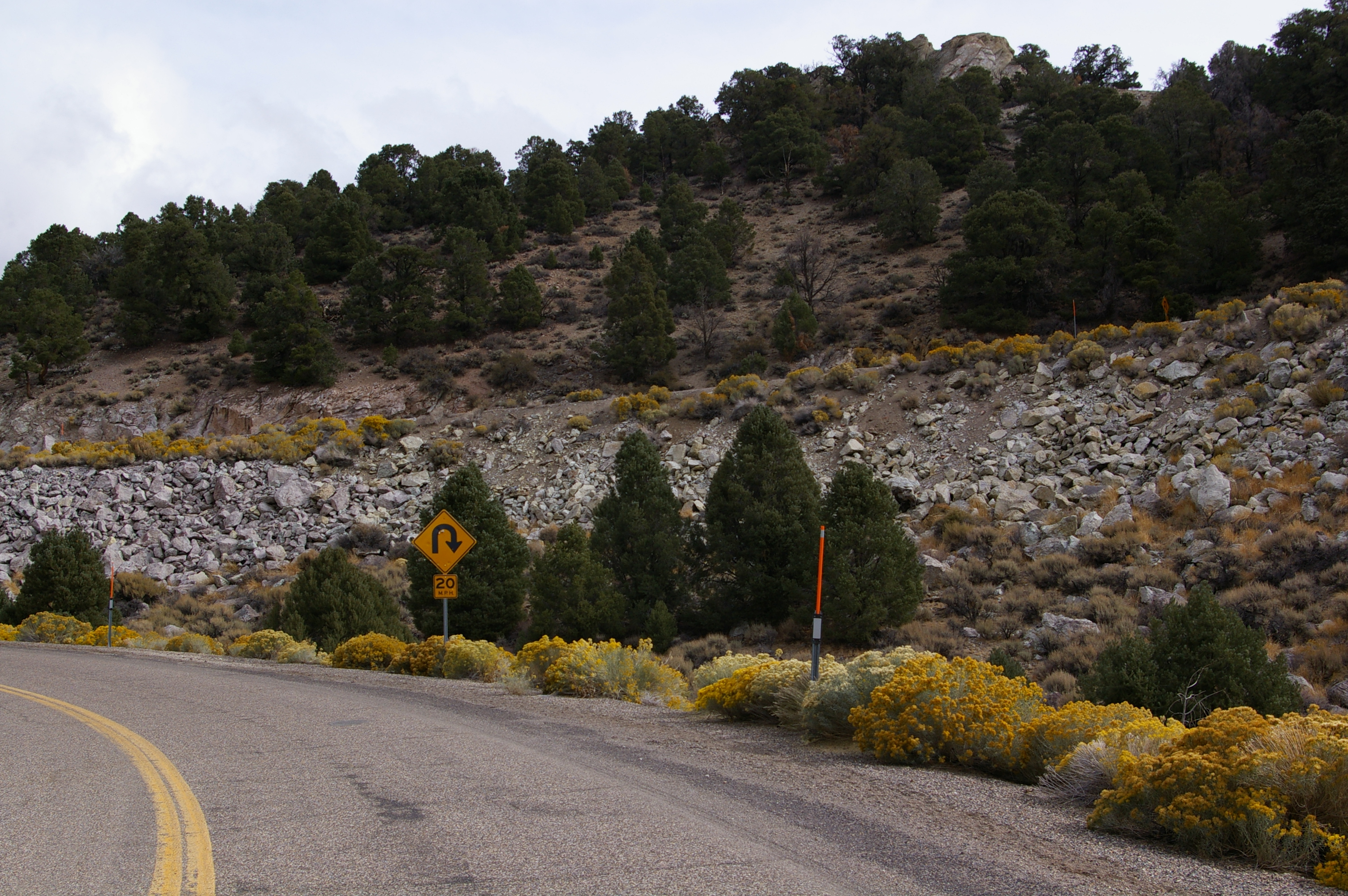
State Route 722 on the approach to Carroll Summit

SR 722 deviates from US 50 near the roadhouse at Middlegate. It then crosses 2 summits, Eastgate at 5,110 feet (1,558 m), and Carroll Summit at 7,492 feet (2,284 m). There is a small settlement at Eastgate. On the west approach to Carroll is an old, unmaintained rest area. The highway then traverses a long desert valley named Smith Creek Valley and another summit, Railroad Pass at 6,431 feet (1,960 m), before entering the Reese River valley where the highway reunites with US 50 just west of Austin.

== History ==
As a dirt road, the routing of the Lincoln Highway across Nevada changed several times. The original route of the Pony Express, from which the Nevada portion of the Lincoln Highway was based, crossed the Desatoya range at Basque Summit, at 7,452 feet (2,271 m). The route used an alignment that is now a dirt road called "Old Overland Road". At one time, the Lincoln Highway was routed on a route similar to the modern US 50 between Middlegate and Austin via New Pass.

The highway now numbered 722 was first constructed in 1924–1925 as part of improvements to the Lincoln Highway. The intent was to shorten the route by 15 miles (24 km). While the route over Carroll Summit and Railroad Pass was shorter and more scenic, efforts began to revert to the New Pass Route as early as the 1930s. The route over New Pass Summit was being paved by 1967 and US 50 was re-routed back over New Pass Summit once finished.

== Major intersections ==
Note: Mileposts in Nevada reset at county lines.

County	Location	mi	km	Destinations	Notes
Churchill	Middlegate	0.000	0.000	US 50 – Fallon, Austin	
Churchill				Ione Road	
Churchill–Lander county line		16.616 0.000	26.741 0.000	Carroll Summit	
Lander		12.000	19.312	Reese River Agricultural District	
Lander		41.523	66.825	US 50 – Austin, Fallon	
1.000 mi = 1.609 km; 1.000 km = 0.621 mi
