= Strawberry, Nevada =

- Ghost town
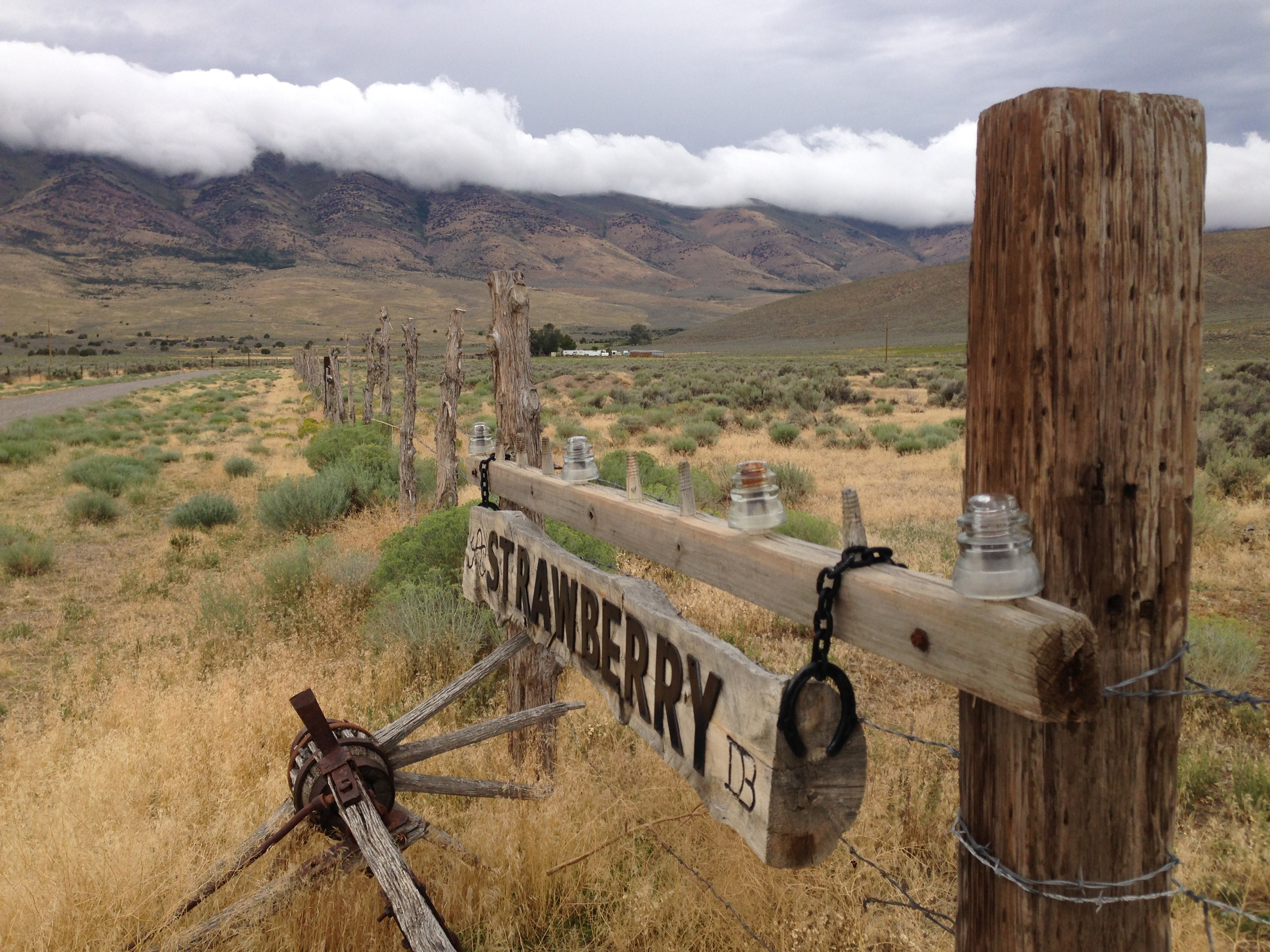

- Location within the state of Nevada Strawberry, Nevada (the United States)
- Coordinates: 39°42′05″N 115°46′33″W
- Country: United States
- State: Nevada
- County: White Pine
- Elevation: 5,951 ft (1,814 m)
- Time zone: UTC-8 (Pacific (PST))
  - Summer (DST): UTC-7 (PDT)
- GNIS feature ID: 850885

Strawberry is a ghost town in White Pine County in the U.S. state of Nevada along Nevada State Route 892. The town was known for its 12,000-tree orchard and huge fields of strawberries. Strawberry is mainly used today as a ranching settlement. The post office was in operation from 1899 until 1938.

The population was 50 in 1940.
