= Nevada State Route 892 =

State highway in Nevada, United States

State Route 892
- Strawberry Road
- SR 892 highlighted in red

Route information
- Maintained by NDOT
- Length: 35.909 mi (57.790 km)

Major junctions
- South end: US 50 near Eureka
- North end: CR 1 north of Strawberry

Location
- Country: United States
- State: Nevada
- County: White Pine

Highway system
- Nevada State Highway System; Interstate; US; State; Pre‑1976; Scenic
← SR 878	→ SR 893

State Route 892 (SR 892) is a state highway in White Pine County, Nevada, United States. It follows Strawberry Road from U.S. Route 50 north along the west side of Newark Valley to a point approximately 12 miles (19 km) north of Strawberry, where pavement ends and road jurisdiction switches to White Pine County.

== Major intersections ==
The entire route is in White Pine County.

Location	mi	km	Destinations	Notes
	0.000	0.000	US 50 – Eureka, Ely	Southern terminus
	35.909	57.790	CR 1	Northern terminus
1.000 mi = 1.609 km; 1.000 km = 0.621 mi

== Gallery ==
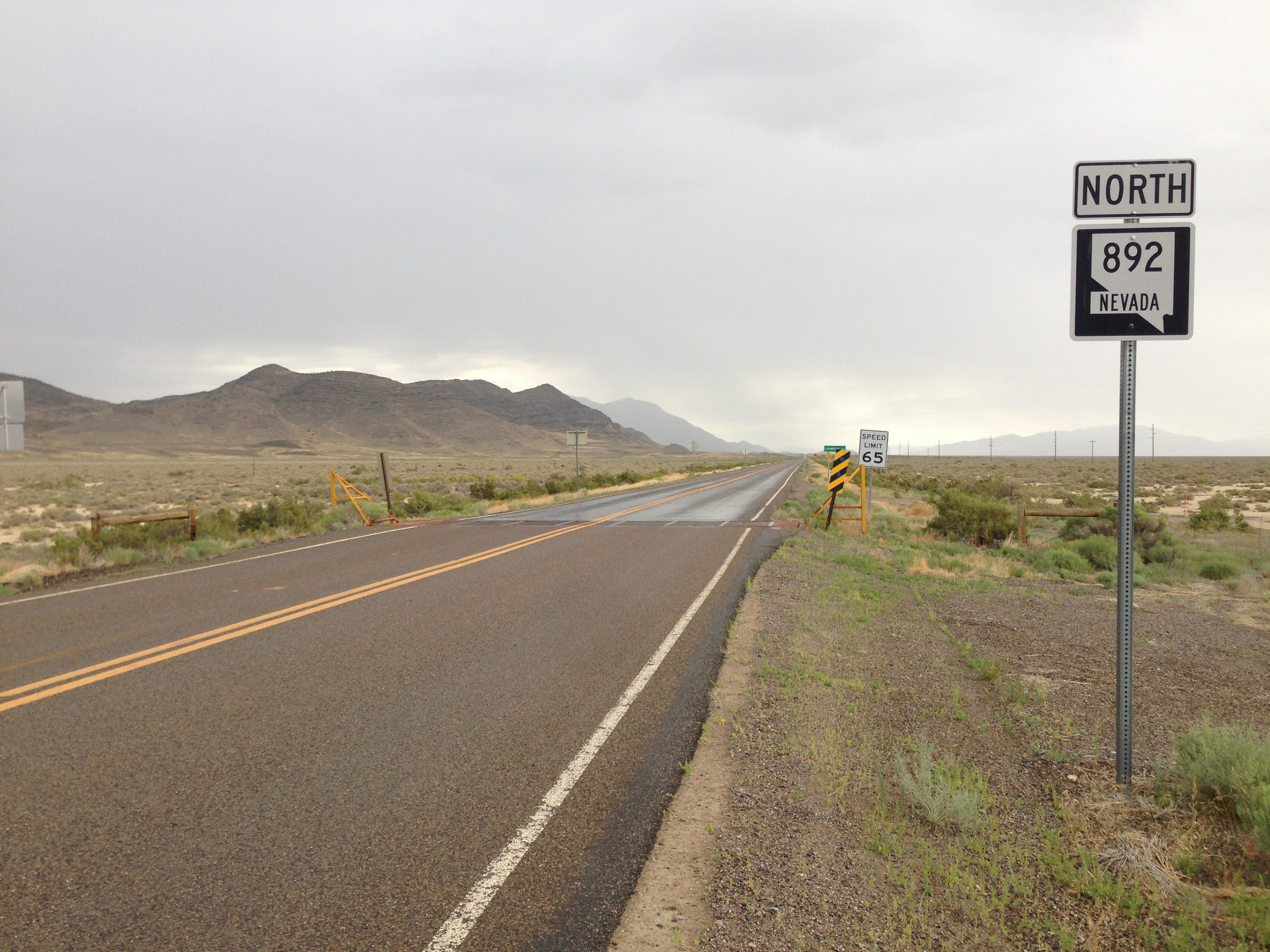
View north from the south end of SR 892
