= Majors Place, Nevada =

Unincorporated community in Nevada, US

- Unincorporated community
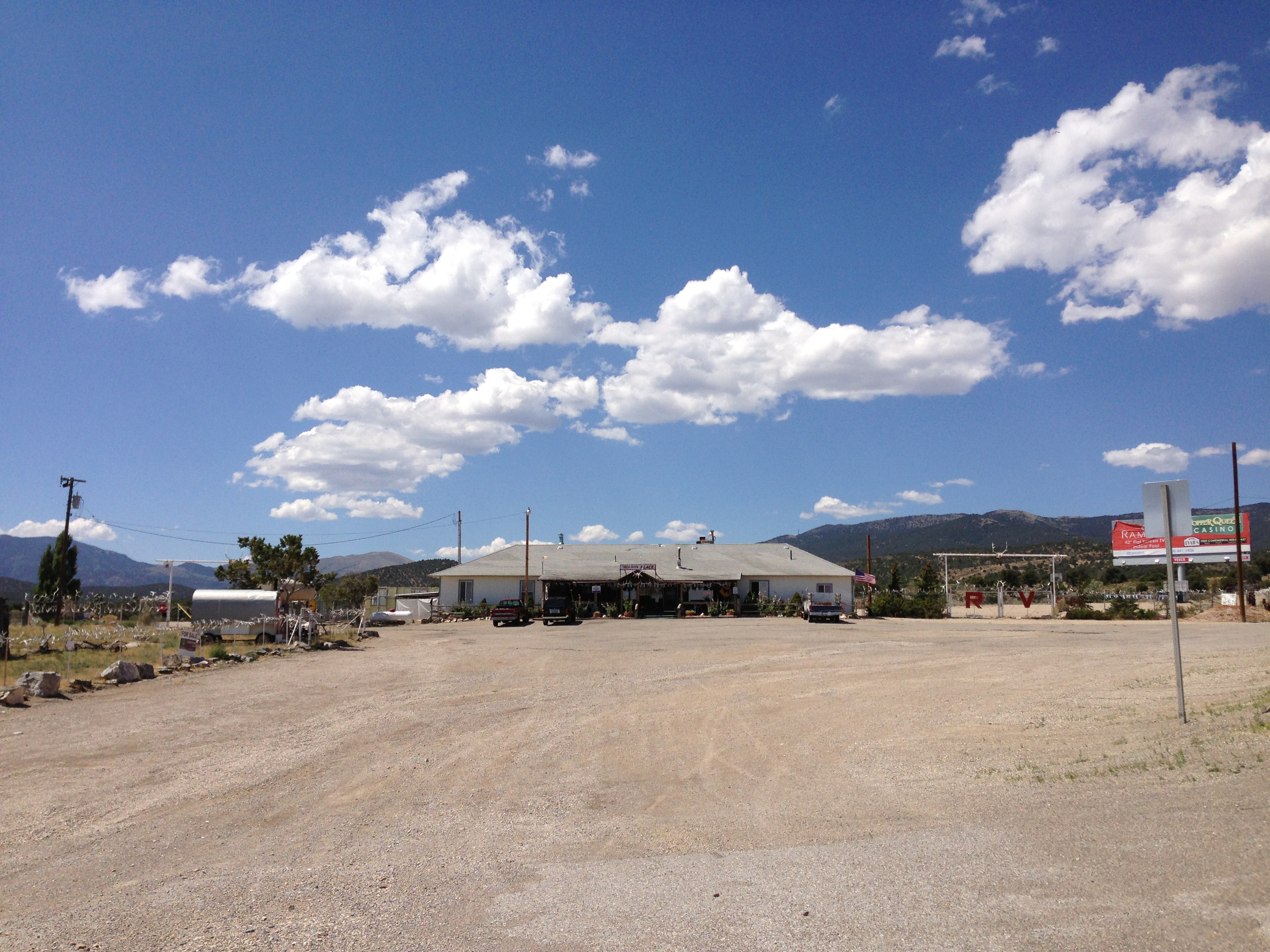
- Etymology: Used to be known as Major Woods, named for the Major J. W. Woods, owner and operator.
- Location within the state of Nevada
- Coordinates: 39°01′30″N 114°34′55″W
- Country: United States
- State: Nevada
- County: White Pine
- Elevation: 6,490 ft (1,980 m)
- Time zone: UTC-8 (Pacific (PST))
  - Summer (DST): UTC-7 (PDT)
- GNIS feature ID: 860466

Majors Place is an unincorporated community in White Pine County, Nevada. It is at the junction of U.S. Route 6, U.S. Route 50 and U.S. Route 93. It includes a bar, restaurant, two hotel rooms, and an RV park. Fuel is no longer available.

In 1933, the location was known as Connors Station. In 1938, Majors Place was known as Conners Station.

Majors Station is east Connors Pass on U.S. Route 50. Connors Pass takes its name from Colonel P.E. Connors, who established Fort Ruby. The Conners variant name is said to take its name for a Mrs. Conners.
