= Cave Rock, Sumner =

Rock formation in Sumner, New Zealand

Cave Rock Tuawera (Māori)
- Rock outcropping
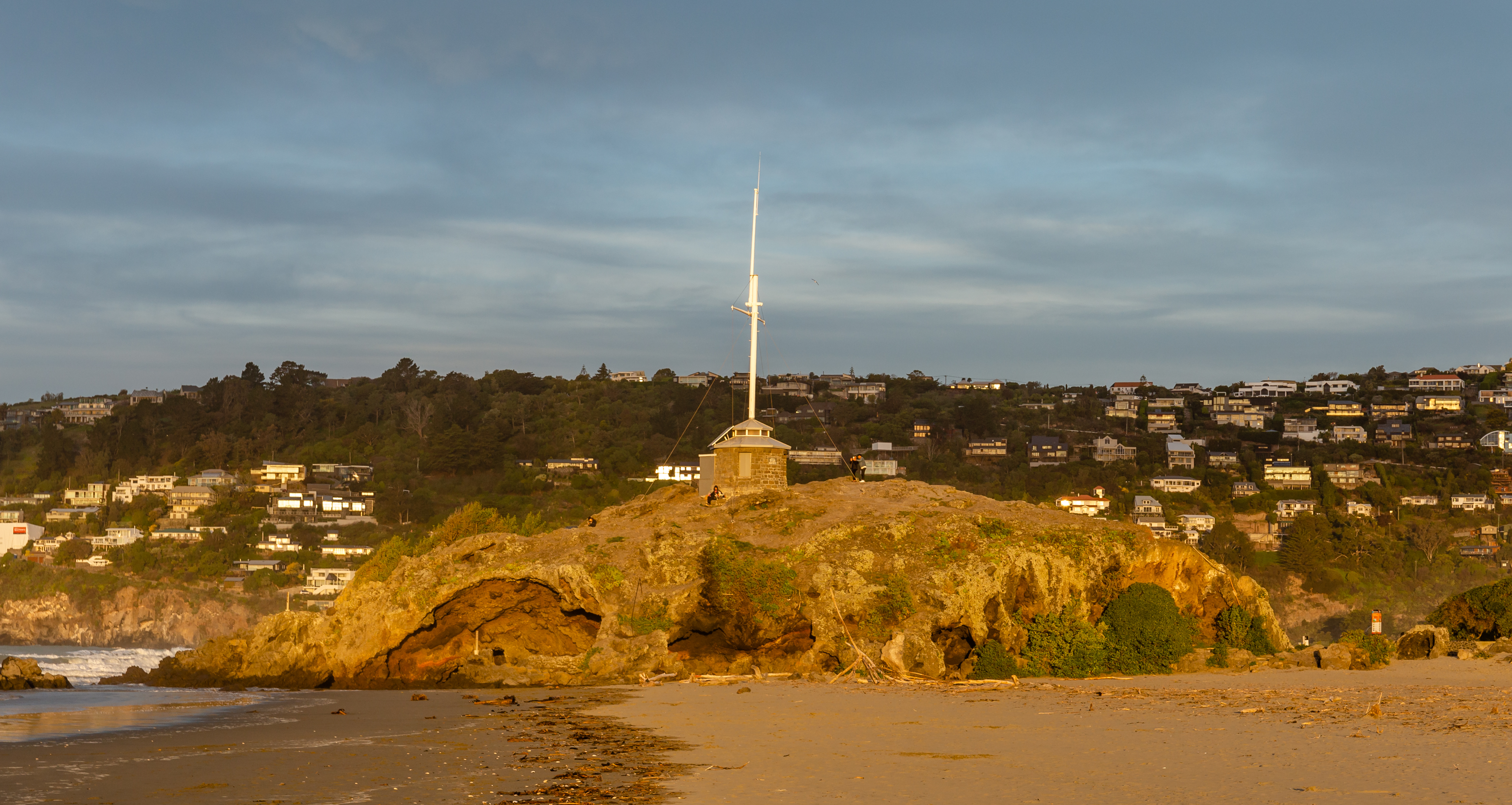
- Cave Rock in 2020

- Location within Banks Peninsula
- Coordinates: 43.5662°S 172.7598°E
- Location: Sumner, New Zealand

Area
  - Total: 0.1 km^{2} (0.04 sq mi)

Dimensions
  - Length: 72 m (236 ft)
  - Width: 56 m (184 ft)
  - Height: 13.29 m (43.6 ft)
- Volcanic field: Banks Peninsula Volcano

Cave Rock (Māori: Tuawera) is a volcanic rock formation in Sumner, New Zealand. The prominent rock outcrop is a visual landmark on Sumner Beach, with a signalling mast built on top.

== Geology ==
Cave Rock is a volcanic rock formation, part of the volcano that formed Banks Peninsula. The rock comprises two layers of basalt lava flow, separated by a tuff layer. Wave action has eroded the rock, creating caves and tunnels. A boulder field on the north-eastern seaward side of the formation may represent a collapsed cave.

== Description ==
Originally the rock formed something of an island in the beach, with seawater completely surrounding it at high tide; however it became silted up due to shoreline stabilisation and is now effectively a peninsula. The interior of the rock contains a tidal cave that can be walked through at low tide. The rock and the caves within are a popular playground for children visiting the beach. The rock can also be climbed, and a natural platform on the seaward side of the rock forms tide pools.

In 1864 a signal mast was erected on top of the rock, to help guide boats in over the Sumner bar, and notify them of the treacherous and rapidly-changing conditions in the area. The stone building was constructed on the summit in 1898, to house the signal equipment and a foghorn. Historically, the mast was used for signal flags and lights, with the lights later becoming decorative. The mast and building were damaged during the 2011 Christchurch earthquake. They were restored in 2016, but the lights were not restored until December 2021.

After restoration of the lights, some residents complained that the glowing mast was "in the shape of a Christian cross" and therefore inappropriate for a public monument, with one resident describing it as "Christian symbolism by stealth". The restoration of the mast lights was partly funded by Breakfree Foundation, a Christian charity group; a representative said she "most definitely" did not see the illuminated mast as a Christian symbol, but also described it as "a reminder and celebration of the central tenant [sic] of the Christian faith – the redemptive love of God for people."

A plaque commemorates Joseph Day, a local lifeboat captain who, with his crew, saved many lives between 1867 and 1897.

== Toponymy ==
The Māori language name for the rock is Tuawera, meaning 'cut down as if by fire'. This name is a reference to a story, in which a local chief made a karakia (prayer or incantation) against another chief who had wronged him. As a result of his karakia, a whale was stranded on the beach at Sumner. When the local tribe cut up and ate the whale, they fell asleep and later died. The name therefore refers to these dead people, as if they had been 'cut down by fire'. The rock itself represents the carcass of the beached whale.

The English name refers to the geology of the rock, which contains a number of large caves that can be accessed at low tide. Captain Joseph Thomas, the surveyor for the Canterbury Association, originally named it 'Cass Rock' after Thomas Cass, but the name never caught on.
