= Cave Rock Tunnel =

Highway tunnel in Nevada, United States

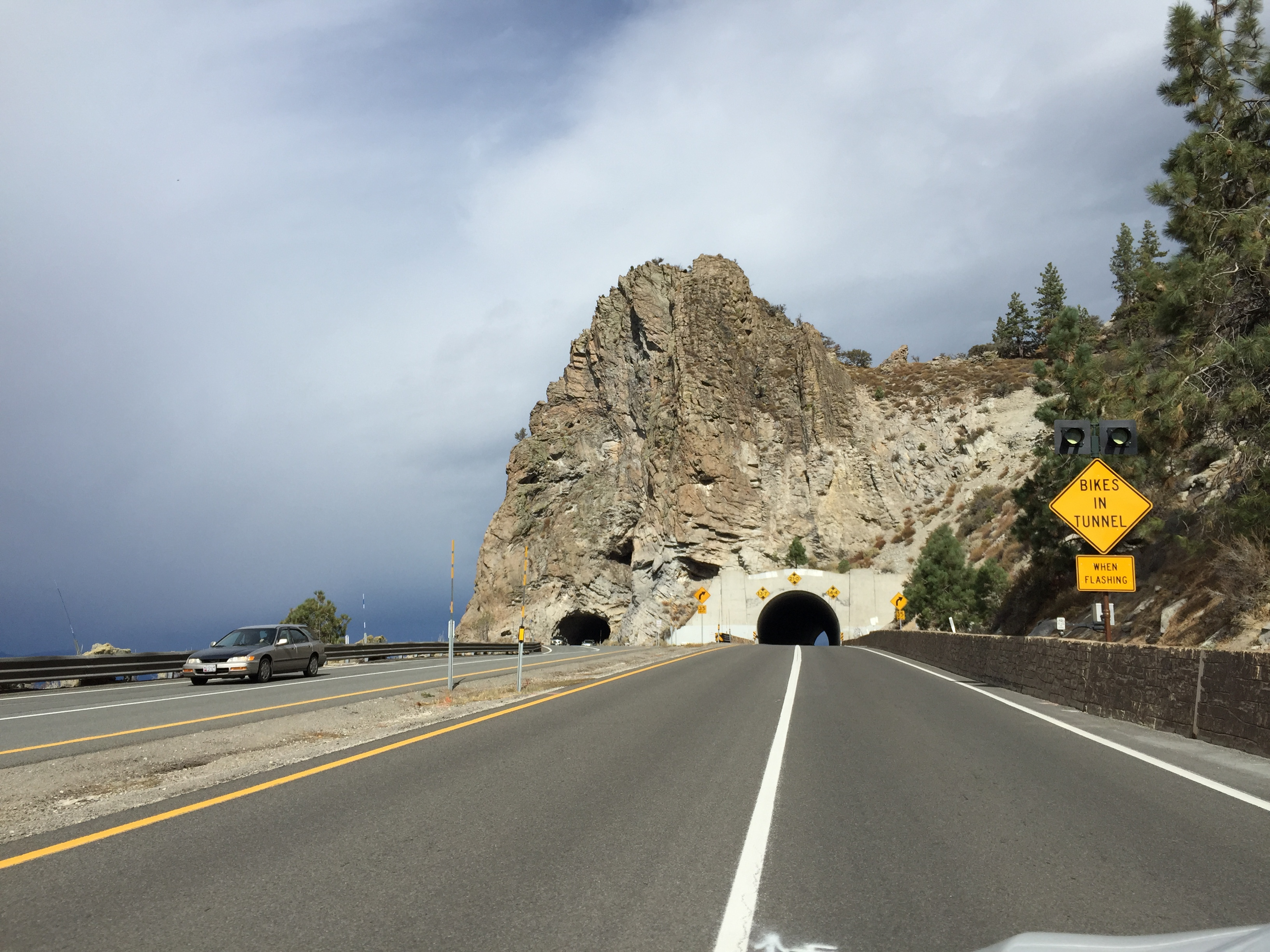
- The Cave Rock Tunnel, viewed from eastbound US 50. The original bore (without the concrete liner) is to the left. The concrete lined bore was built when US 50 was widened to four lanes
- Interactive map of Cave Rock Tunnel

Overview
- Location: Eastern shore of Lake Tahoe between Glenbrook and Zephyr Cove
- Coordinates: 39.046594°N 119.948065°W
- Route: US 50

Operation
- Opened: 1931; 95 years ago
- Operator: Nevada Department of Transportation
- Character: Dual bore highway tunnel
- Vehicles per day: 12,500

Technical
- Length: 153 feet (47 m) (westbound); 410 feet (120 m) (eastbound)
- No. of lanes: 4
- Max elevation: 6,360 feet (1,940 m)

The Cave Rock Tunnel is a dual bore highway tunnel on U.S. Route 50 (US 50) along the eastern shore of Lake Tahoe approximately seven miles (11 km) north of Stateline, in Douglas County, Nevada, United States. It passes through Cave Rock, a volcanic stone formation. To the Washoe Indian Tribe, Cave Rock (Washo: De ek Wadapush) is considered a sacred place and the tribe has placed restrictions on recreational activities in the vicinity of the tunnel.

== Description ==
The tunnels carry U.S. Route 50 through Cave Rock, a mountain on the eastern shore of Lake Tahoe. Numerous small caves are adjacent to the south portal of both tunnels and give the rock its name. The tunnel is between the towns of Zephyr Cove and Glenbrook along the US 50 corridor. This portion of US 50 is a National Scenic Byway, part of the Lake Tahoe - Eastshore Drive. The westbound bore is 153 feet (47 m) long and features exposed rock; the eastbound bore features a concrete liner and is 410 feet (120 m) long. The tunnels are an elevation of at approximately 6,360 feet (1,940 m), about 80 feet (24 m) above the level of the lake.

== History ==
The tunnel dates back to the Lincoln Highway. Originally the Lincoln Highway was routed along a single lane hanging bridge and rock wall built in 1863. Recognizing the inadequacy of the single lane road, efforts began to improve capacity on the primary road to Lake Tahoe. The first bore was constructed in 1931, as part of a reconstruction of a 3-mile (4.8 km) section of the Lincoln Highway. Concerned about damaging Cave Rock, the project managers employed key people from the recently completed Zion-Mt. Carmel Tunnel in what is now Zion National Park in Utah. The first traffic began flowing through the bore in mid-September of that year. Construction on the second bore began in 1957, when US 50 was widened to four lanes, at a cost of just over $450,000 (equivalent to $5 million today). Coincidentally, both bores were constructed by Utah-based construction companies.

After a 2015 rockslide, and observations of more unstable rock in the area, the Nevada Department of Transportation initiated a safety improvement and retrofit project in 2016. The project retrofitted parts of the original 1931 bore with a concrete liner and extended the tunnel by 60 feet (18 m) on its north end by constructing a rock fall shelter to protect the roadway from falling rocks. The retrofit included new lighting for both tunnels, and variable message signs on the approaches designed to activate upon the presence of bicyclists or ice inside the tunnel.

=== Tribal relations ===
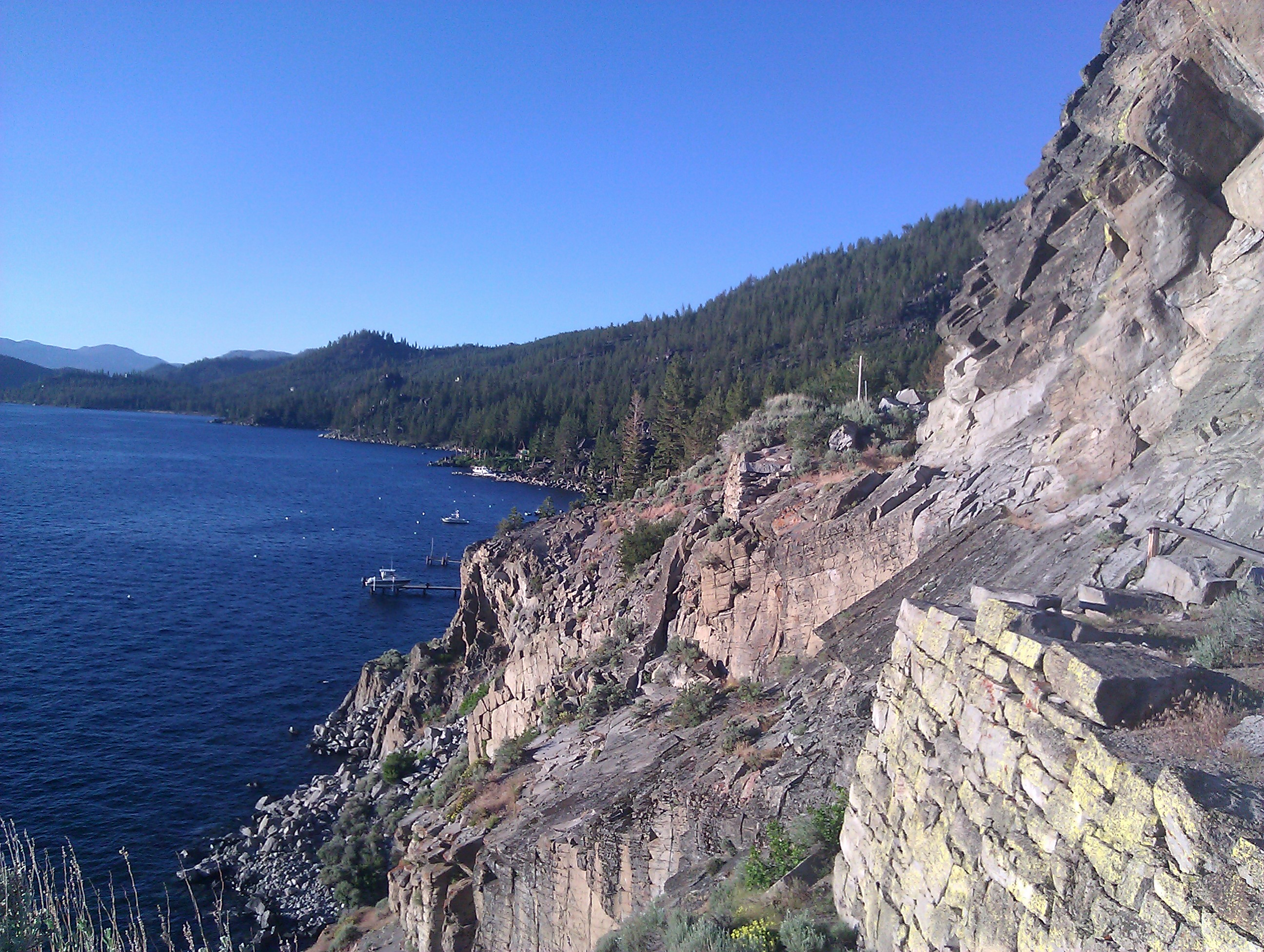
What remains of the single lane hanging bridge that predated the Cave Rock tunnel

The Cave Rock area is considered sacred by the Washoe tribe. The Washoe tribal leaders were not consulted about the construction of either bore, and were upset about the desecration of their tribal lands. Within the last decade, the Washoe Tribe has had a larger influence on Cave Rock and its historic preservation. In 2007, the Federal Government ruled on a precedent-setting case that has restricted activities around the tunnel, such as rock climbing.

Driving through the tunnel
