= Cave Rock (location) =

- deʔek wadapush (Cave Rock) Traditional Cultural Property
- U.S. National Register of Historic Places
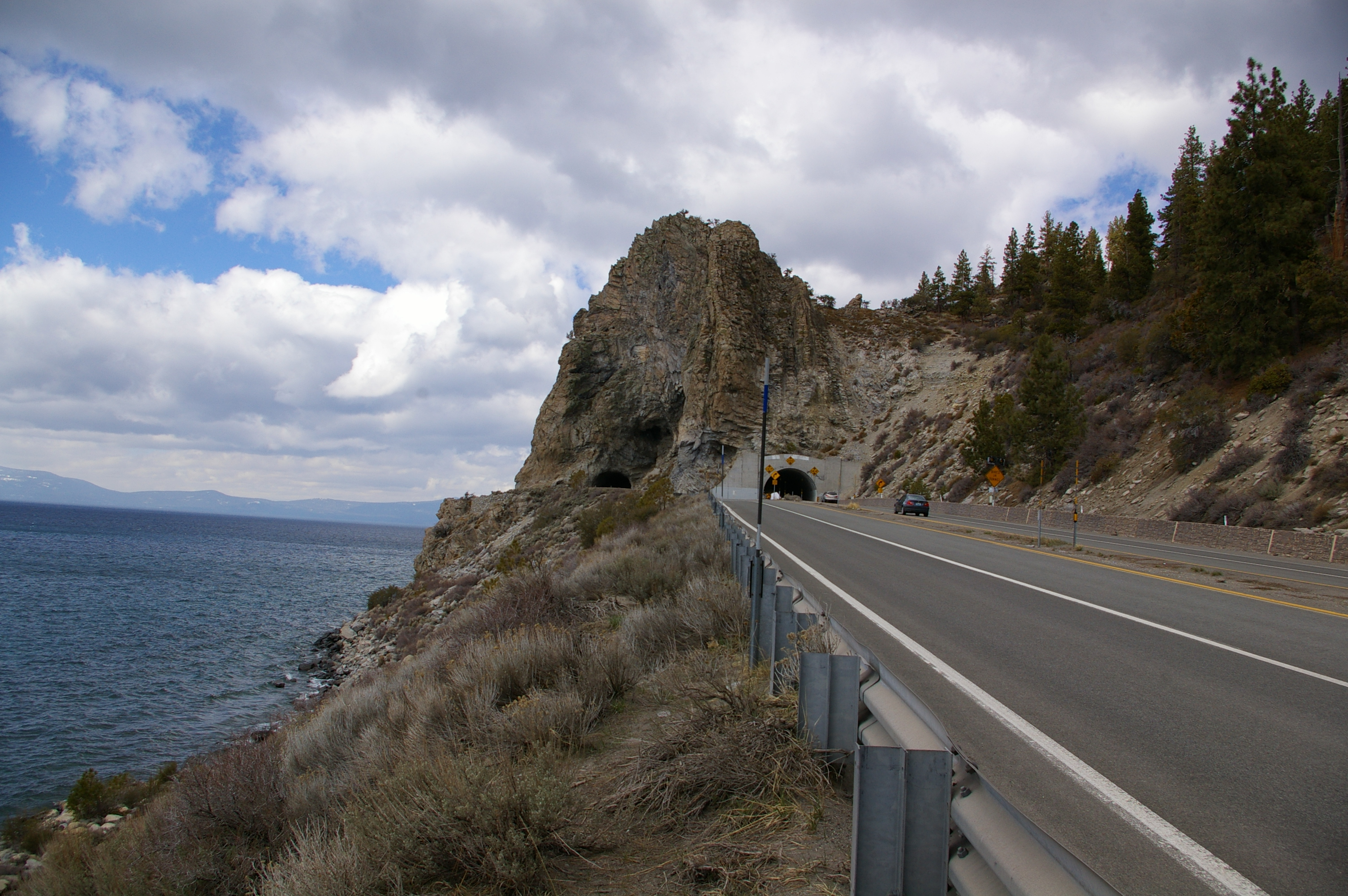

- Location within Nevada Location within the United States
- Nearest city: Stateline, Nevada
- Coordinates: 39°2′47.75″N 119°56′53″W
- NRHP reference No.: 100000610)
- Added to NRHP: January 31, 2017

Cave Rock, also known as deʔek wadapush (Washo for Standing Gray Rock), is a stone formation on U.S. Route 50 north of Stateline, Nevada. It is a column of volcanic andesite standing about 250 feet (76 m) tall. US 50 passes under the rock through the Cave Rock Tunnel. The formation was designated a Traditional Cultural Property and listed on the National Register of Historic Places in 2017.

== History ==
Cave Rock is a remnant of a volcanic vent. The original volcanic cone built through that vent was based high above the present ground level and was eroded away long ago. The rock's caves were carved by waves during the Last Glacial Period, when Lake Tahoe's water level was hundreds of feet higher. The local Washoe people hold the formation as sacred, and believe only shamans should visit the area. During the Gold Rush and the Pony Express, wagon trails were established to traverse the rock. The formation remained a hindrance to travel despite these trails, leading to the construction of a trestle bridge around the outside of the rock in the 1860s. In 1931, the first tunnel through the rock was made, followed by a second in 1957 to alleviate traffic. The trestle bridge remained open to pedestrians until 1964, when it was dismantled due to safety concerns.

The formation is the subject of a conflict between the Washoe tribe and rock climbers, with whom it is a popular climbing site. In 1997, the Washoe people complained about visitors to the rock, and sought to ban women altogether from the area. This request was refused, but a subsequent request to ban rock climbers from the area was approved by the United States Forest Service and upheld in court in 2003. Members of The Access Fund challenged this decision on constitutional grounds in 2005, leading to the United States Court of Appeals for the Ninth Circuit supporting the closure "on the grounds that Cave Rock has historical significance." A permanent climbing ban was enacted on February 28, 2008. The rock is open to hikers.

== See also ==
- National Register of Historic Places listings in Douglas County, Nevada
