= Eastgate, Nevada =

Unincorporated community in Nevada, U.S.

- Unincorporated community
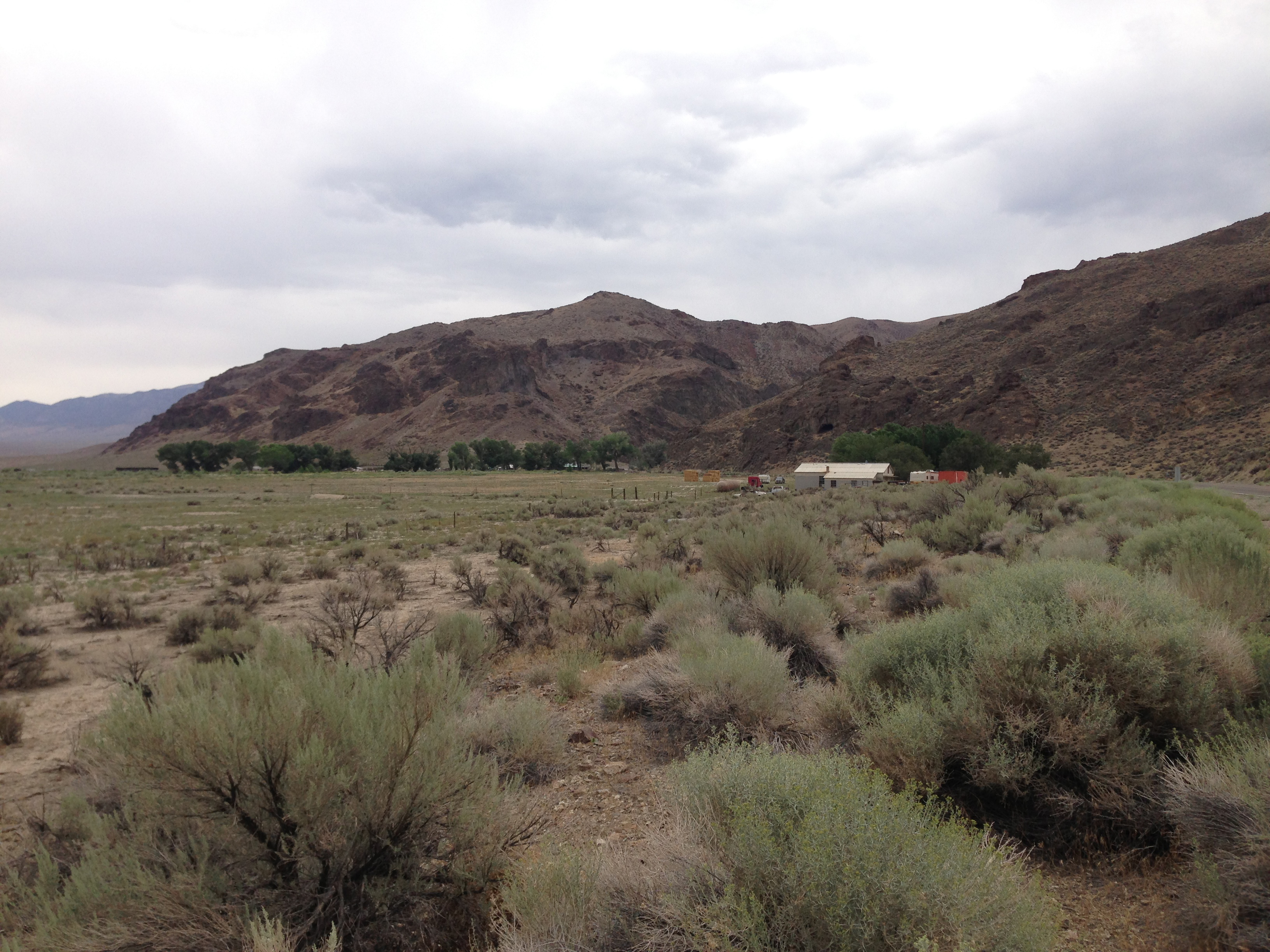

- Location within Nevada Location within the United States
- Coordinates: 39°18′20″N 117°52′44″W
- Country: United States
- State: Nevada
- County: Churchill
- Elevation: 5,095 ft (1,553 m)
- GNIS feature ID: 0854435

Eastgate is an unincorporated community located within Churchill County, Nevada, United States. It is located on Nevada State Route 722, which was formerly known as the Lincoln Highway. Other alternate unofficial names include East Gate, Eastgate Station, and Gibralter Gate.

Eastgate was once a station on the Central Overland Route. In 1859, Captain James Simpson named Eastgate for the shape of the hills which form a pass.
