= Dixie Valley, Nevada =

- Ghost town
- Location within Nevada Location within the United States
- Coordinates: 39°41′16″N 118°4′50″W
- Country: United States
- State: Nevada
- County: Churchill
- Elevation: 3,435 ft (1,047 m)
- Postal code: 89406
- GNIS feature ID: 856015

Dixie Valley was a small ranching town in Churchill County, Nevada until the area was acquired in 1995 by the United States Navy for the Fallon Range Training Complex (FRTC).

The town had no retail businesses, most residents were more than a mile from their nearest neighbor, and a 1-room school (grades 1–8) was the teacher's residence and served as a meeting, dance, and election hall (grades 9–12 were bussed 75 miles to Fallon, Nevada). The abandoned town of Dixie was established at the head of Dixie Valley in 1861 and named by Southern sympathizers.

The population was 49 in 1940.

The medium-sized Dixie Valley geothermal power plant (1988, 66 megawatts) employs ~30 people and has 12 production steam wells and ~24 injection wells.

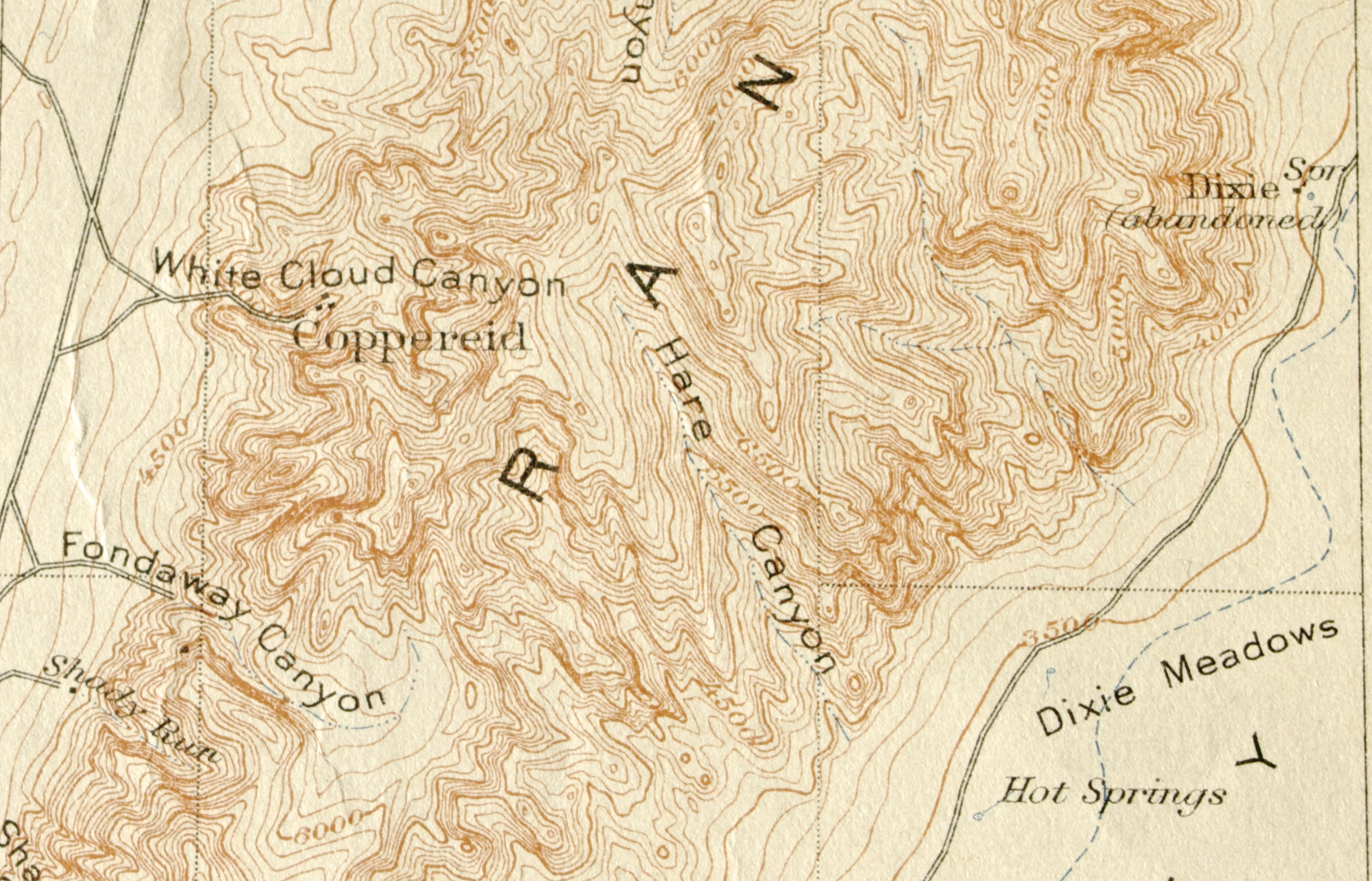
Detail from 1910 map showing the location of the former town of Dixie

== 1954 earthquakes ==
A very large doublet earthquake occurred on December 16, 1954. The Dixie Valley–Fairview earthquakes occurred four minutes apart, each with a maximum Mercalli intensity of X (Extreme). The initial shock measured 7.3 M_{w} and the second shock measured 6.9 M_{w}. Damage to man-made structures was minimal because the region was sparsely populated at the time, but oblique-slip motion on a normal fault resulted in the appearance of large fault scarps.

== Education ==
The Churchill County School District is the school district of the county. By 1971, the board of trustees opted to close the Dixie Valley school. At the time, ten Dixie Valley students were enrolled in the schools in Fallon.
