= Nevada State Route 116 =

State highway in Nevada, United States

State Route 116
- Stillwater Road

Route information
- Maintained by NDOT
- Length: 10.488 mi (16.879 km)
- Existed: 1976–present
- History: Created as SR 42 by 1940

Major junctions
- West end: US 50 east of Fallon
- East end: Stillwater

Location
- Country: United States
- State: Nevada
- Counties: Churchill

Highway system
- Nevada State Highway System; Interstate; US; State; Pre‑1976; Scenic
← SR 115	→ SR 117

State Route 116 (SR 116) is a state highway in Churchill County, Nevada, United States. Known as Stillwater Road, it connects the small town of Stillwater to U.S. Route 50 (US 50) east of Fallon. The road was established by 1940 as SR 42, and was renumbered to SR 116 in 1976.

== Route description ==
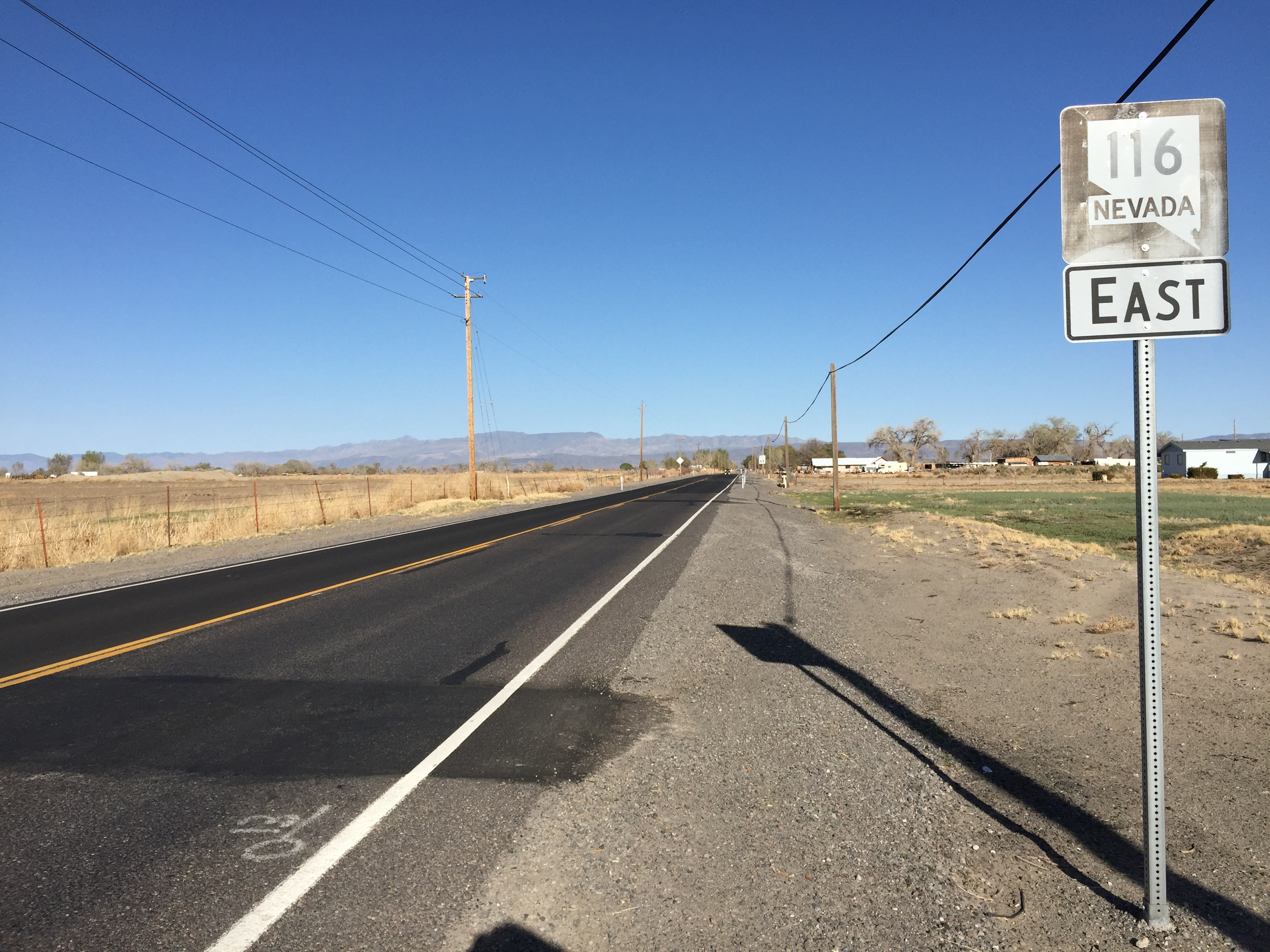
View eastbound from the western terminus of SR 116

SR 116 is a two-lane roadway that traverses through a combination of agricultural and desert terrain in the Lahontan Valley. The route begins at an intersection with US 50, approximately 4.5 miles (7.2 km) east of downtown Fallon. From there, the road travels in a northeasterly direction, stair-stepping easterly and northerly through farm plots. For a short distance, the route forms is part of the southern boundary of the Fallon Paiute-Shoshone Indian Reservation. After 10.5 miles (16.9 km), the road reaches the small town of Stillwater. SR 116 reaches its eastern terminus on the eastern edge of the town, but Stillwater Road continues east towards the Stillwater Point Reservoir and the Stillwater National Wildlife Refuge.

== History ==
A paved road approximating the current alignment of Stillwater Road was constructed by 1939. At that time, the road had a western terminus in Fallon. By 1940, the road was assigned the designation of State Route 42 on the official state map. As of 1957, SR 42 was approximately 14.5 miles (23.3 km) long—its western terminus was at the intersection of Stillwater Avenue and Harrigan Road in Fallon, with the route extending eastward along the Stillwater Avenue alignment before shifting northward near Crook Road to the present-day US 50 alignment. By 1960, the western end of SR 42 was truncated to its current western terminus at present-day US 50, concurrent with the shift of US 50 to the current alignment which leaves downtown Fallon in an eastward direction.

The highway did not see any further changes until the 1976 renumbering of Nevada's state highway system on July 1, 1976. In that process, SR 42 was renumbered to State Route 116. This change was first seen on the official state highway map in 1978. The route has remained relatively unchanged since.

== Major intersections ==
SR 116 was State Route 42 from 1940 to 1976

The entire route is in Churchill County.

Location	mi	km	Destinations	Notes
	0	0.0	US 50 – Fallon, Austin	Western terminus
Stillwater			Stillwater Road	Continuation beyond eastern terminus
1.000 mi = 1.609 km; 1.000 km = 0.621 mi

== See also ==
- List of state routes in Nevada
