= Mary Daisy White =

American politician and business owner

- Born: Mary Daisy Allen; March 31, 1873; Churchill County, Nevada
- Died: January 19, 1958 (aged 84); Churchill County, Nevada
- Other names: Daisy Allen, Daisy Williams, Daisy White, Mary Daisy White Williams
- Occupation: One of the first women elected to the Nevada Assembly
- Spouse(s): Edward J. Williams (divorced); James Abernathy White (deceased, 1929)
- Parent(s): Lemuel S. Allen and Sarah Ann (Peugh) Allen

Mary Daisy White (March 31, 1873 – January 19, 1958) was a 20th-century American politician and business owner. One of the first women ever elected to the Nevada State Legislature, she represented rural Churchill County from November 1924 to November 1926. In 1953, she was declared to be the oldest Churchill County native still living in the county.

== Formative years and family ==
Born as Mary Daisy Allen at the St. Clair Station in Churchill County, Nevada on March 31, 1873, Mary Daisy White was a daughter of American pioneer settlers Lemuel S. Allen (1839-1918) and Sarah Ann (Peugh) Allen (1839-1926) and a sibling of Lemuel L. Allen (1875-1962) and Sarah Elizabeth (Allen) Coniff (1877-1961), who was known to family and friends as "Bess." Her parents arrived in Nevada before her birth, settling in Churchill County in 1862. Her father, a rancher, later became a county prosecuting attorney, three-time member of the Nevada Assembly, Speaker of the Assembly, and from 1903 to 1907, the Lieutenant Governor of Nevada. According to historian Dana R. Bennett, although Daisy Allen's father “voted in 1889 for legislation that allowed women to hold school offices, he voted against woman suffrage in 1897, arguing loudly on the floor of the Assembly that Eve’s perfidy in Eden demonstrated Nevada women's inadequacy to vote.”

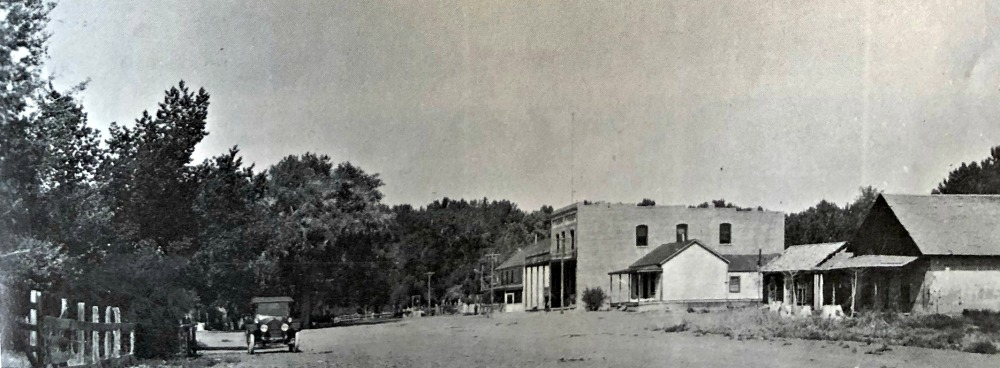
Stillwater, Nevada, roughly seven years after Daisy Allen collected data there about the town's residents for the 1900 U.S. Census.

Shortly after the turn of the century, she was employed by the U.S. Census Bureau as an enumerator for the 1900 United States census, and was involved in collecting data about residents in multiple communities in Churchill County, including Alpine, Hot Springs, New River, St. Clair, where her family's ranch was located, and Stillwater, as well as the "American Indian population in Dixie Valley," according to Daisy White's biographers, Patti Bernard and Janice Hoke. Per the instructions that Daisy White and other enumerators received from the U.S. Census Bureau regarding how to conduct the Twelfth Decennial Census, she was responsible for maintaining "street books" to document the data she collected each day, "used individual census slips for obtaining a correct return for any person (particularly lodgers and boarders) absent at the time of the enumerator's visit," and completed "absent family schedules" to create "a complete record for any person residing within the enumeration district [who was] temporarily absent." The information that she was required to obtain from each Native American resident of Dixie Valley included: the "name of Indian tribe; tribal affiliation of mother and father; whether of full or mixed blood; whether living in polygamy; whether taxed; year of acquiring citizenship and whether acquired by allotment; [and] whether living in a fixed or moveable dwelling." This information that she was required to obtain was "in addition to that of the general population schedule," which documented the: "address; name; relationship to head of family; sex; race; age; month and year of birth; marital status; number of years married; for women, number of children born and number now living; place of birth of person and parents; if foreign born, year of immigration to the U.S., number of years in the U.S., and whether naturalized; occupation; months not employed; months attended school during census year; literacy; [and] ability to speak English" for each resident of the communities she was hired to enumerate.

In 1906, Daisy Allen wed Edward J. Williams, and became involved with him in the operation of a hotel and other businesses in the mining town of Fairview, Nevada. After relocating with him to Reno, Nevada and then Butte, Montana, she divorced him and returned to Churchill County. In 1929, she married mining engineer James Abernathy White (1860-1929) and they settled in Reno, but she was widowed just nine months later when her husband was killed in a Thanksgiving Day-accident while he was traveling from Ione, where he worked, to their home in Reno.

== Political and business career ==
In 1924, she ran for, and won, a seat in the Nevada State Legislature. Her local newspaper in Fallon, Nevada, The Fallon Standard, noted in its edition on August 6 that she was “known for her executive ability.” A member of the Counties and City Boundaries, Judiciary, and State Institutions committees, she was appointed chair of the latter and, in 1925, co-sponsored an act to amend public highway legislation. It was approved on March 21 of that year. Opting not to run for another term, she returned to the business world, and operated the Allen Hotel on Fallon's Carson Street.

== Death and interment ==
Declared to be the oldest living native of Churchill County in 1953, her health declined over the next several years, and she was hospitalized at the Churchill Public Hospital. She died there on January 19, 1958. Her funeral was held at 2 p.m. on Wednesday, January 22 at the Austin Mortuary in Fallon, and was officiated by the Rev. Joseph Pritchard of the Methodist church. She was interred in the family plot at the cemetery in Fallon.

== See also ==
- Timeline of women's suffrage in Nevada
- Women's suffrage in Nevada
