= Hot Springs =

Hot Springs or Hot Spring may refer to:

== Places ==
=== United States ===
- Hot Springs, Arkansas
  - Hot Springs National Park, Arkansas
- Hot Spring County, Arkansas
- Hot Springs, Placer County, California
- Hot Springs, Montana
- Hot Springs, Nevada
- Hot Springs, North Carolina
- Hot Springs, South Dakota
- Hot Springs (Big Bend National Park), Texas
- Hot Springs, Virginia
- Hot Springs, Washington
- Hot Springs County, Wyoming
- Hot Springs State Park, Wyoming
- Hot Springs, New Mexico the former name of the town of Truth or Consequences, New Mexico

=== Canada ===
- Hot Springs Camp, the original name of Ainsworth Hot Springs, British Columbia, Canada
- Hot Springs Cove near Tofino, British Columbia, Canada
- Hotspring Island, part of the Haida Gwaii archipelago, British Columbia, Canada

=== India ===
- Hot Springs, Chang Chenmo Valley, India

=== Zimbabwe ===
- Hot Springs, Manicaland, in Manicaland Province, Zimbabwe

=== Spain ===
- Modern Caldas de Reis in Spain was called Aquae calidae (Ancient Greek: Ὕδατα Θερμά, meaning hot springs) in ancient times

== Other uses ==
- Hot Springs (band), a Canadian indie rock band
- Hot Springs (novel), a novel written by Stephen Hunter

== See also ==
- Hot spring
- Hot springs around the world
- Onsen, Japanese hot spring
- List of hot springs in the United States
- List of hot springs in Japan
