= Mineral Hill =

Mineral Hill may refer to:

- Mineral Hill, Nevada, a ghost town in the United States
- Mineral Hill, New South Wales, a former mining village in Australia
- Tabarin Peninsula#Mineral Hill a round-topped hill in Antarctica
- Mineral Hills, Michigan, a former village in the United States
