= Spirit Cave =

Spirit Cave may refer to these archaeological sites:

- Spirit Cave, a cave in Nevada, U.S., known for the discovery of the Spirit Cave mummy
- Spirit Cave (Thailand), a cave in Mae Hong Son Province, Thailand, occupied by hunter-foragers of the Hoabinhian culture
