= Carson Lake =

Carson Lake may refer to one of several lakes:

In Canada:

- Carson Lake in Manitoba in Riding Mountain National Park, NTS map sheet 62J12
- One of two lakes of that name in York County, New Brunswick, one on NTS map sheet 21J15, the other on NTS map sheet 21J10
- Carson Lake (Ontario), one of six lakes of that name in Ontario
- One of two lakes of that name in Saskatchewan, one on NTS map sheet 064L11, the other on NTS map sheet 63L09

In the United States:

- Carson Lake in Garfield County, Nebraska
- Carson Lake (now Carson Sink), Churchill County, Nevada
- Carson Lake Clark County, South Dakota
- Carson Lake Madison County, Texas
- Carson Lake Mason County, Washington
- Carson Lake Fremont County, Wyoming
- Carson Lakes Sweetwater County, Wyoming
- There is also a Scout Carson Lake in Alpine County, California
