= Nevada State Route 120 =

State highway in Nevada, United States

State Route 120
- Pasture Road
- Nevada State Route 120, highlighted in red.

Route information
- Maintained by NDOT
- Length: 6.260 mi (10.074 km)
- Existed: July 1, 1976–present

Major junctions
- Southwest end: Future I-11 / US 95 south of Fallon
- Northeast end: SR 119 southeast of Fallon

Location
- Country: United States
- State: Nevada
- County: Churchill

Highway system
- Nevada State Highway System; Interstate; US; State; Pre‑1976; Scenic
← SR 119	→ SR 140

State Route 120 (SR 120) is a state highway in Churchill County, Nevada. It connects U.S. Route 95 (US 95) to State Route 119 just outside Naval Air Station Fallon.

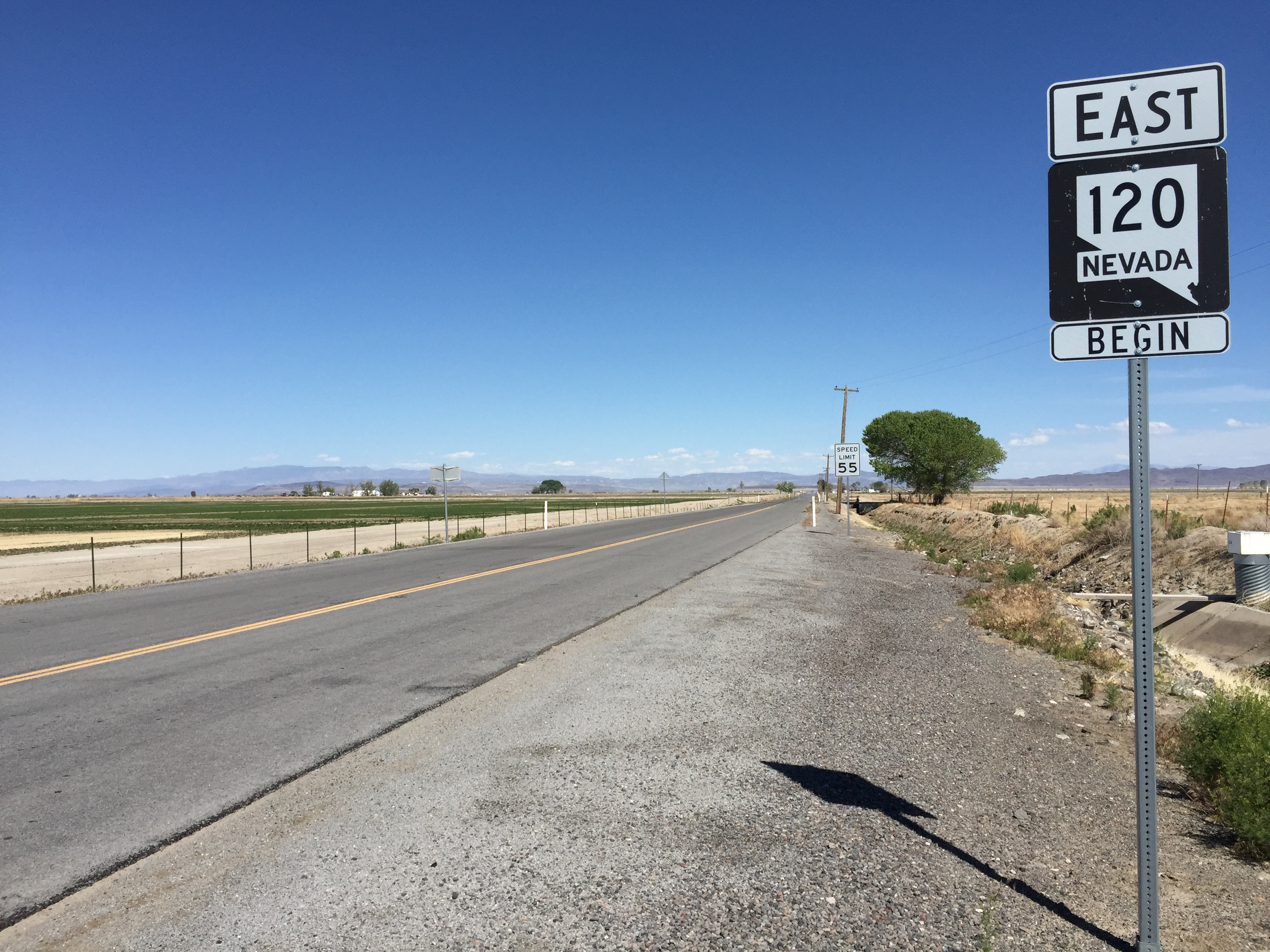
View from the west end of SR 120 looking eastbound as seen in 2015

== Route description ==
State Route 120 begins south of the city of Fallon, at the intersection of US 95 and Pasture Road. From there, the route follows Pasture Road eastward through agricultural and farmlands south of Fallon. After about 3 miles (4.8 km), the route comes close to the northern shore of Carson Lake. At this point, the highway turns northward to traverse through more agricultural areas. SR 120 reaches its terminus at the southwest corner of Naval Air Station Fallon, at the intersection of Pasture Road and Berney Road (SR 119), although Pasture Road continues north to access the airbase.

== History ==
SR 120 was designated on July 1, 1976.

== Major intersections ==
The entire route is in Churchill County.

Location	mi	km	Destinations	Notes
	0.000	0.000	Future I-11 / US 95 – Hawthorne, Las Vegas	Proposed interchange; southwestern terminus
	6.260	10.074	SR 119 / Berney Road	Northeastern terminus
1.000 mi = 1.609 km; 1.000 km = 0.621 mi
