= Nevada State Route 115 =

Highway in Nevada

State Route 115
- Harrigan Road

Route information
- Maintained by NDOT
- Length: 4.822 mi (7.760 km)
- Existed: 1976–present

Major junctions
- South end: SR 119 in Fallon
- North end: Stillwater Avenue in Fallon

Location
- Country: United States
- State: Nevada
- Counties: Churchill

Highway system
- Nevada State Highway System; Interstate; US; State; Pre‑1976; Scenic
← US 95	→ SR 116

State Route 115 (SR 115) is a state highway outside the city of Fallon, Nevada in the United States. Known as Harrigan Road, SR 115 starts at an intersection with SR 119 (Berney Road) and runs north to an intersection with Stillwater Avenue, paralleling U.S. Route 95 (US 95).

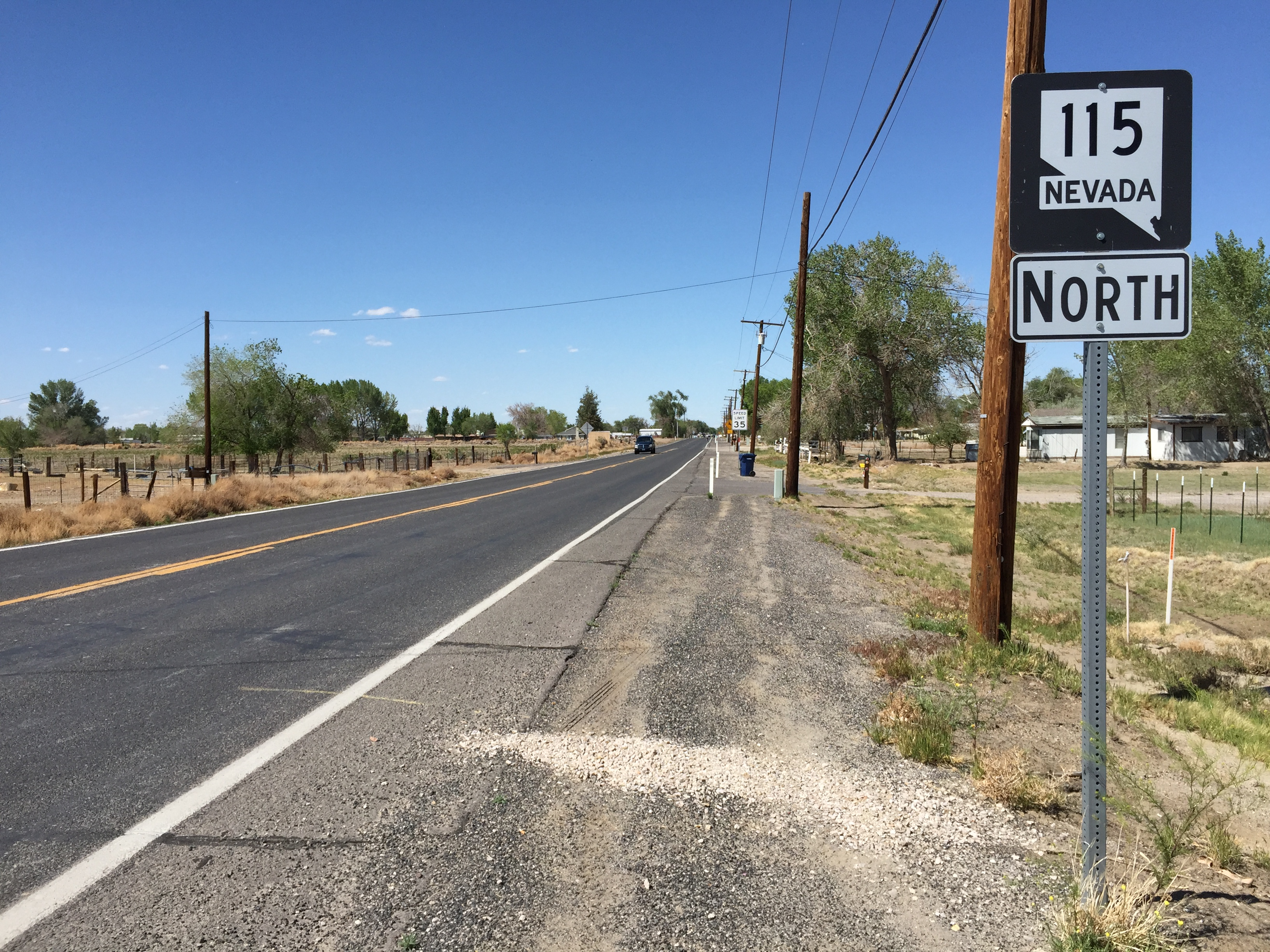
View northbound along SR 115 at the junction with SR 118

== History ==
In the late 1950s, modern SR 115 was part of SR 2 and U.S. Route 50 Alternate, which began at SR 119 (then part of US 50) and followed Stillwater Avenue, East Street, and Center Street to end at Maine Street (also then US 50). This alternate route had previously been part of US 50, which was moved to follow present SR 119 and US 95 to Maine Street. US 50 has since been realigned again to leave Fallon on former SR 42 and turn southeast to rejoin the old alignment at Grimes Point.

== Major intersections ==
The entire route is in Churchill County.

Location	mi	km	Destinations	Notes
	0.00	0.00	SR 119 (Berney Road)	
			SR 720 (Union Lane) – Naval Air Station Fallon	
			SR 118 (Wildes Road)	
Fallon	4.82	7.76	Stillwater Avenue	
1.000 mi = 1.609 km; 1.000 km = 0.621 mi
