= Spirit Cave mummy =

Human mummy found in Nevada

Spirit Cave Mummy
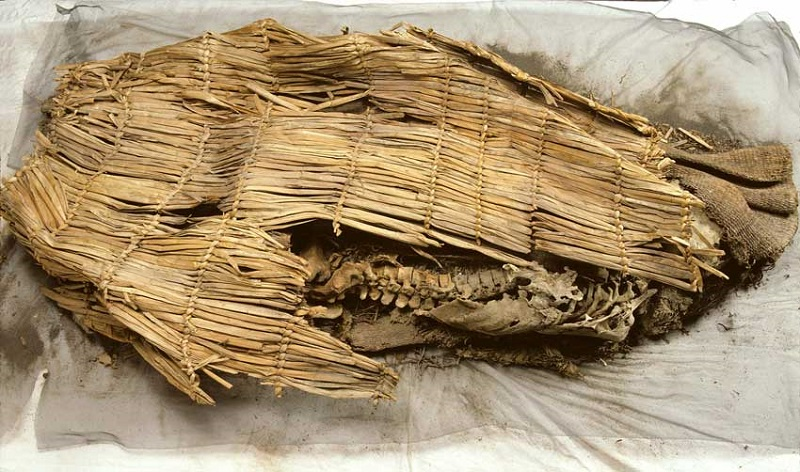
- Spirit Cave Mummy remains, still wrapped in material it was placed in
- Died: c. 7420 BC now Nevada, United States
- Body discovered: 1940 by Sydney and Georgia Wheeler

The Spirit Cave mummy is the oldest human mummy found in North America. It was discovered in 1940 in Spirit Cave, 13 miles (21 km) east of Fallon, Nevada, United States, by the husband-and-wife archaeological team of Sydney and Georgia Wheeler. Analysis of the remains showed similarities to North and South American indigenous peoples and in 2016, the remains were repatriated to the Fallon Paiute-Shoshone Tribe of Nevada. The Spirit Cave mummy was one of the first to be dated using accelerated mass spectrometer radiocarbon dating. In turn, its discovery and analysis gave much insight and motivation of further research into the chronology of the western Great Basin.

== Identity and dating ==
The individual who became known as the Spirit Cave mummy lived during the early Holocene, approximately 11,500 years ago, in the western Great Basin, in what is now Nevada. When the burial was excavated in 1940, the remains were estimated to be between 1,500 and 2,000 years old. For several decades, the individual was understood to have lived within that timeframe.

In 1996, accelerator mass spectrometry radiocarbon dating substantially revised this estimate. Analysis of artefacts associated with the burial indicated an age of approximately 9,400 radiocarbon years before present, confirming that the burial dated to about 11,500 years ago. The findings showed that the Spirit Cave individual had lived thousands of years earlier than previously believed and, at the time, represented the oldest known mummy discovered in North America.

The revised age placed the individual among the earliest known inhabitants of the continent and prompted renewed study of ancestry and cultural affiliation. A study completed in 2000 was unable to establish a definitive relationship between the remains and a present-day tribe. In 2015, researchers obtained bone and tooth samples for ancient DNA analysis with the permission of the Fallon Paiute-Shoshone Tribe. Results published in 2018 found that the individual was genetically closely related to Indigenous peoples of the Americas. These findings helped resolve longstanding questions about ancestry.

== Discovery ==
The Spirit Cave mummy was discovered in 1940 by archaeologists Sydney and Georgia Wheeler while they were surveying sites for the Nevada State Parks Commission to identify archaeological sites that might be threatened by guano mining. The burial was found in Spirit Cave, a cave about 21 kilometres (13 mi) east of Fallon, Nevada, in the foothills of the Stillwater Mountains near the former shores of prehistoric Lake Lahontan in the western Great Basin. At an elevation of 1,266 metres (4,154 ft), the cave is located in an area that later became part of the Stillwater National Wildlife Refuge.

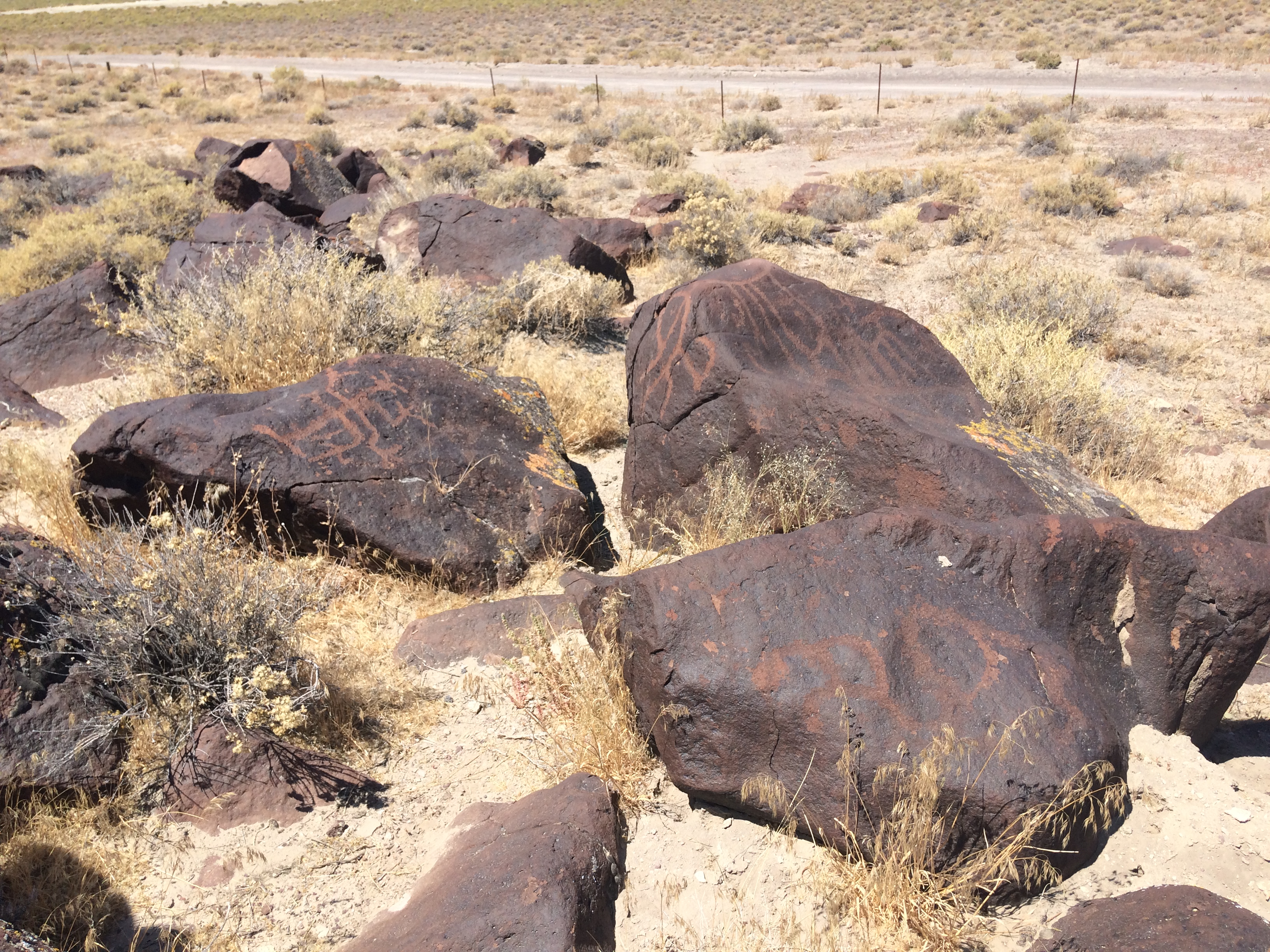
Lahontan Valley

The Spirit Cave individual was one of two people found within Spirit Cave. The burial was located deeper within the cave than the second set of human remains and was partially mummified, with soft tissue surviving on the head and right shoulder.

When the burial was excavated in 1940, the body was found wrapped in a rabbit-skin blanket and enclosed within woven tule matting. The individual had also been buried wearing moccasins, some of which survived the excavation.

In total, sixty-seven artefacts were recovered from the cave. The remains and associated artefacts were subsequently transferred to the Nevada State Museum in Carson City, Nevada, where they were initially estimated to be between 1,500 and 2,000 years old.

== Preservation ==
The Spirit Cave mummy was naturally preserved within the dry environment of Spirit Cave. Unlike intentionally embalmed mummies, preservation occurred through natural processes rather than deliberate treatment of the body. The arid conditions within the cave slowed decomposition and allowed portions of the skin, hair, and other soft tissues to survive for thousands of years. At the time of excavation, the individual was found wrapped in a rabbit-skin robe and enclosed within woven tule mats. These coverings protected the body, and the preservation of the remains enabled researchers to examine surviving soft tissues, hair, and associated burial materials.

== Repatriation and DNA Analysis ==
In March 1997, the Paiute-Shoshone Tribe of the Fallon Reservation and Colony made a Native American Graves Protection and Repatriation Act (NAGPRA) claim of cultural affiliation with the artifacts.

In 2000, further study was unable to establish a definitive affiliation of the remains.

In September 2006, the United States District Court for the District of Nevada ruled on a lawsuit by the Fallon Paiute-Shoshone Tribe and said that the Bureau of Land Management (BLM) made an error in dismissing evidence without a full explanation. The court order remanded the matter back to the BLM for reconsideration of the evidence.

In October 2015, Eske Willerslev collected bone and tooth samples from the remains with the permission of the Fallon Paiute-Shoshone Tribe. DNA analysis indicated that the remains were similar to North and South American indigenous groups. On November 22, 2016, the remains were repatriated to the tribe. Willerslev attended the 2018 burial of the remains by the tribe.

In November 2018, researchers reported that the DNA sequencing of the remains were used in research about Paleoamericans (Y-haplogroup Q1b1a1a1-M848, mt-haplogroup D1).

== Wizards Beach Man ==
The remains of a man from the same era, Wizards Beach Man, were also in the collection of the Nevada State Museum. The remains were radiocarbon dated at the same time. This turned out to be another early Holocene skeleton dating to almost exactly the same era.

Wizards Beach Man was found in 1978 at Wizards Beach on Pyramid Lake, about 100 miles (160 km) to the northwest from Spirit Cave. Radiocarbon dating has established that he lived more than 9,200 years ago.

Lovelock Cave, another important early site, is also nearby.

== See also ==
- Grimes Point
