= Nevada State Route 720 =

State highway in Nevada, United States

State Route 720
- Union Lane; Pasture Road
- SR 720 highlighted in red

Route information
- Maintained by NDOT
- Length: 3.248 mi (5.227 km)
- Existed: July 1, 1976–present

Major junctions
- West end: US 95 south of Fallon
- East end: Pasture Road south of Fallon

Location
- Country: United States
- State: Nevada
- County: Churchill

Highway system
- Nevada State Highway System; Interstate; US; State; Pre‑1976; Scenic
← SR 718	→ SR 722

State Route 720 (SR 720) is a 3.248-mile-long (5.227 km) state highway in Churchill County, Nevada, south of Fallon. It serves Naval Air Station Fallon.

== Route description ==
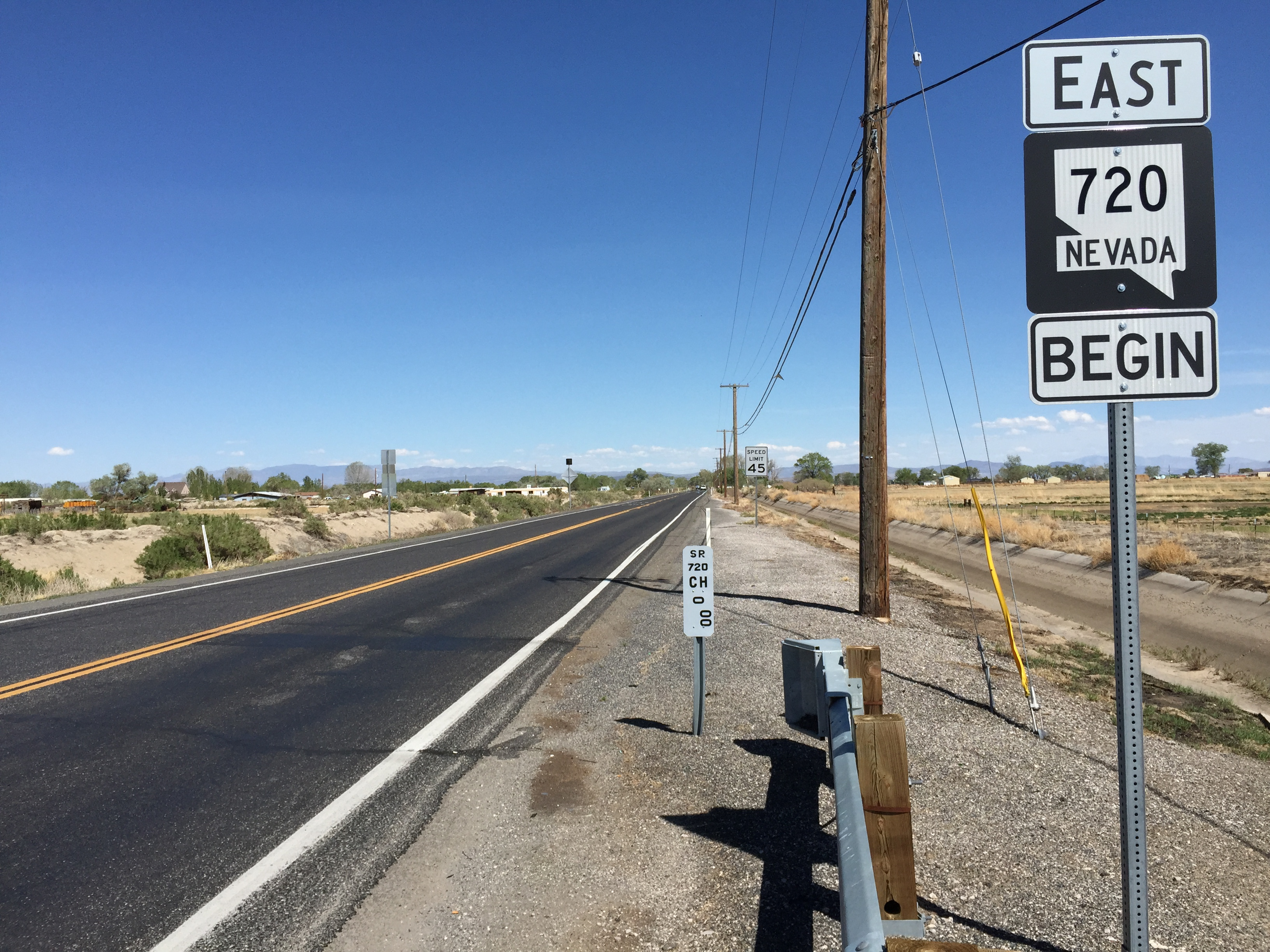
View at the west end of SR 720 looking eastbound as seen in 2015

State Route 720 begins at a junction with U.S. Route 95 (US 95) approximately 4 miles (6.4 km) south of downtown Fallon. From there, the highway runs due east along Union Lane, a two-lane road which passes through agricultural areas. After about 3 miles (4.8 km), Union Lane ends at an intersection with Pasture Road adjacent to Naval Air Station Fallon. SR 720 turns to follow the two-lane Pasture Road north another 0.25 miles (0.40 km) to an intersection with Cottonwood Drive at the main entrance to NAS Fallon.

== History ==
The alignment of present-day Union Lane appears on maps as early as 1937, although it formerly extended further east prior to the creation of NAS Fallon. By 1957, the roadway existed in its current form albeit without a recognized state highway number, and was fully paved by 1969.

The roadway was first designated as a state highway on July 1, 1976.

== Major intersections ==
The entire route is in Churchill County.

Location	mi	km	Destinations	Notes
	0.000	0.000	US 95 – Fallon, Hawthorne	Western terminus
			SR 115 (Harrigan Road)	
	3.248	5.227	Cottonwood Drive / NAS Fallon main gate	Eastern terminus
1.000 mi = 1.609 km; 1.000 km = 0.621 mi
