= Stillwater, Nevada =

- Ghost town
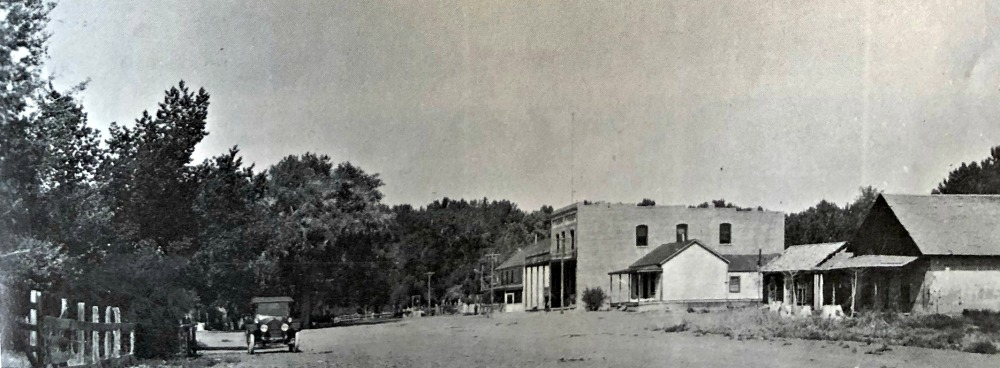

- Location within Nevada
- Coordinates: 39°31′18″N 118°32′50″W
- Country: United States
- State: Nevada
- County: Churchill

Stillwater is a ghost town in Churchill County, Nevada, United States. From November 8, 1867 to January 1, 1904, Stillwater served as the county seat of Churchill County until the role was moved to Fallon.

In July 1862, a station of the Central Overland California and Pikes Peak Express Company was established in Churchill County. Its name was derived from the Stillwater Slough which was a deep sluggish waterway. Settlers began arriving in the fall of 1862 and the spring of 1863, and the town of Stillwater grew up around the station. On November 7, 1867, following a county vote, Stillwater became the county seat of Churchill County, replacing La Plata, and by May 7, 1868, the county seat post office had been moved there. Between 1867 and 1868, Stillwater was its most prosperous, with a population of 150.

On January 1, 1904, following an act by the 21st Nevada Legislature, the county seat and courthouse were moved to Fallon Following the removal of county seat status, the decline of Stillwater was hastened, although the population was listed as 420 as late as 1940. The Stillwater National Wildlife Refuge was established in 1949. Stillwater was a Pony Express Stop.

== Gallery ==
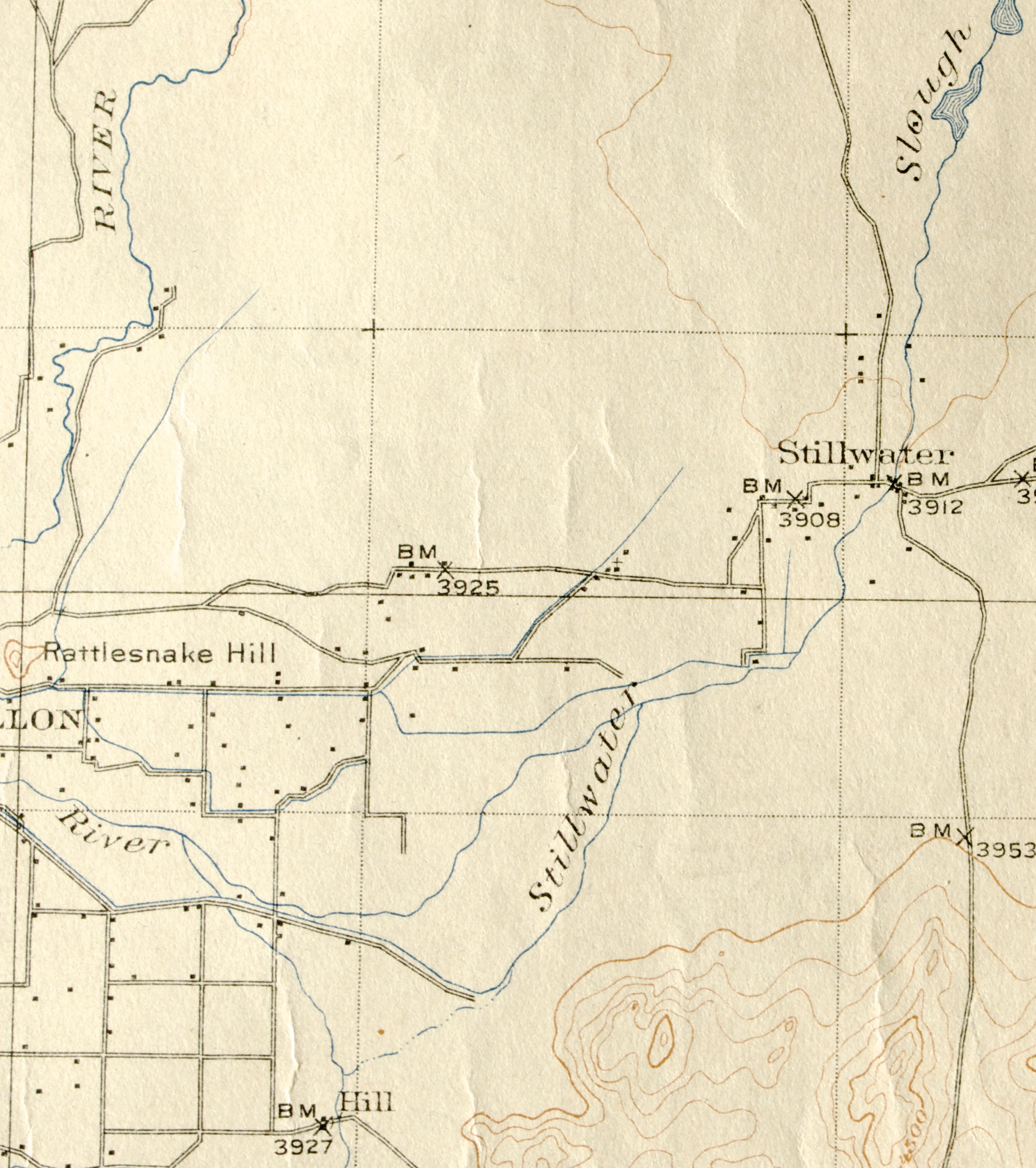
Detail of 1910 map

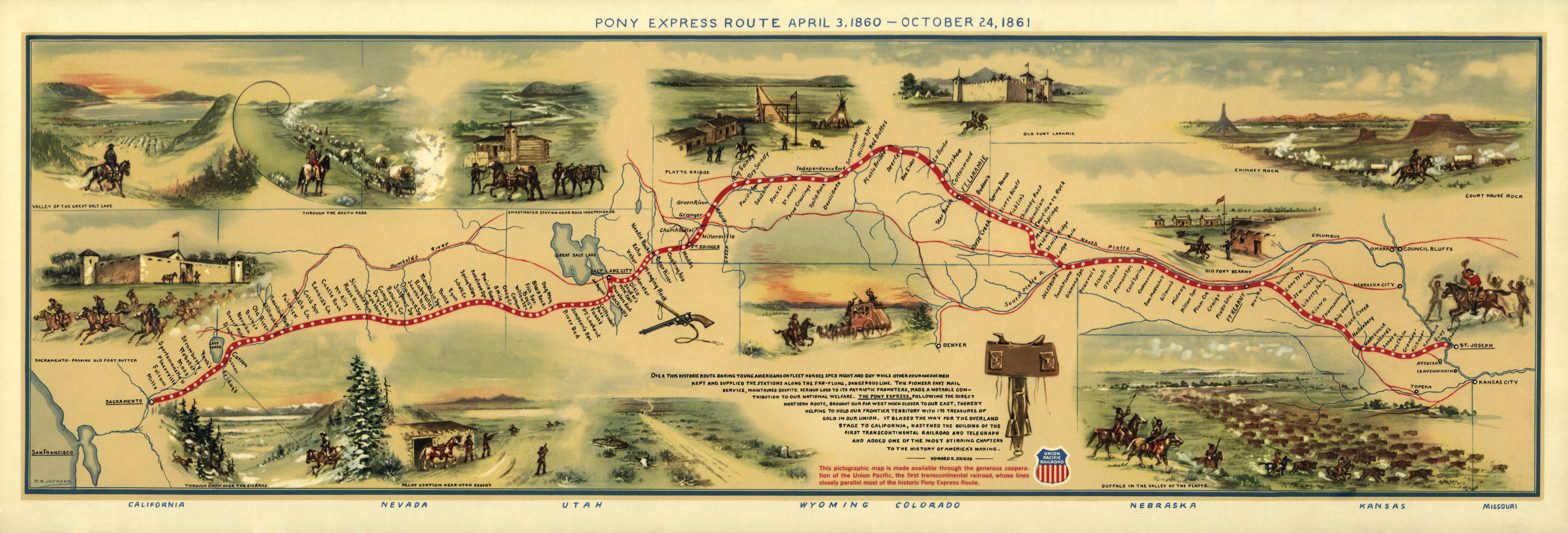
Pony Express route map

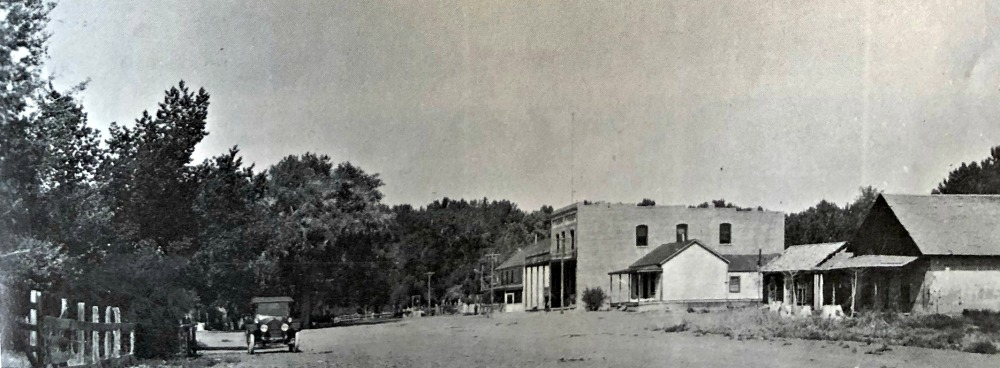
Stillwater main street 1907
