= Nevada State Route 117 =

State highway in Nevada, United States

State Route 117
- Sheckler Road

Route information
- Maintained by NDOT
- Length: 6.914 mi (11.127 km)
- Existed: 1976–present

Major junctions
- West end: US 50 in Fallon
- East end: US 95 in Fallon

Location
- Country: United States
- State: Nevada
- Counties: Churchill

Highway system
- Nevada State Highway System; Interstate; US; State; Pre‑1976; Scenic
← SR 116	→ SR 118

State Route 117 (SR 117) is a state highway in Churchill County, Nevada. The route serves farm areas around the southwest side of the city of Fallon.

== Route description ==
State Route 117 begins about 5 miles (8.0 km) west of downtown Fallon, at the intersection of U.S. Route 50 (US 50) and the Sheckler Cut Off. From that intersection, the route follows the two-lane Sheckler Cut Off due south through farm lands and ranches. After nearly 2 miles (3.2 km), SR 117 turns sharply eastward, now traveling on Sheckler Road. The route continues to travel through the agricultural areas of Fallon on its trek east. After almost 5 miles (8.0 km) along Sheckler Road, the route passes by the Churchill County Fairground and the Churchill County High School. SR 117 then meets its eastern terminus at the intersection of Sheckler Road and US 95 south of downtown Fallon.

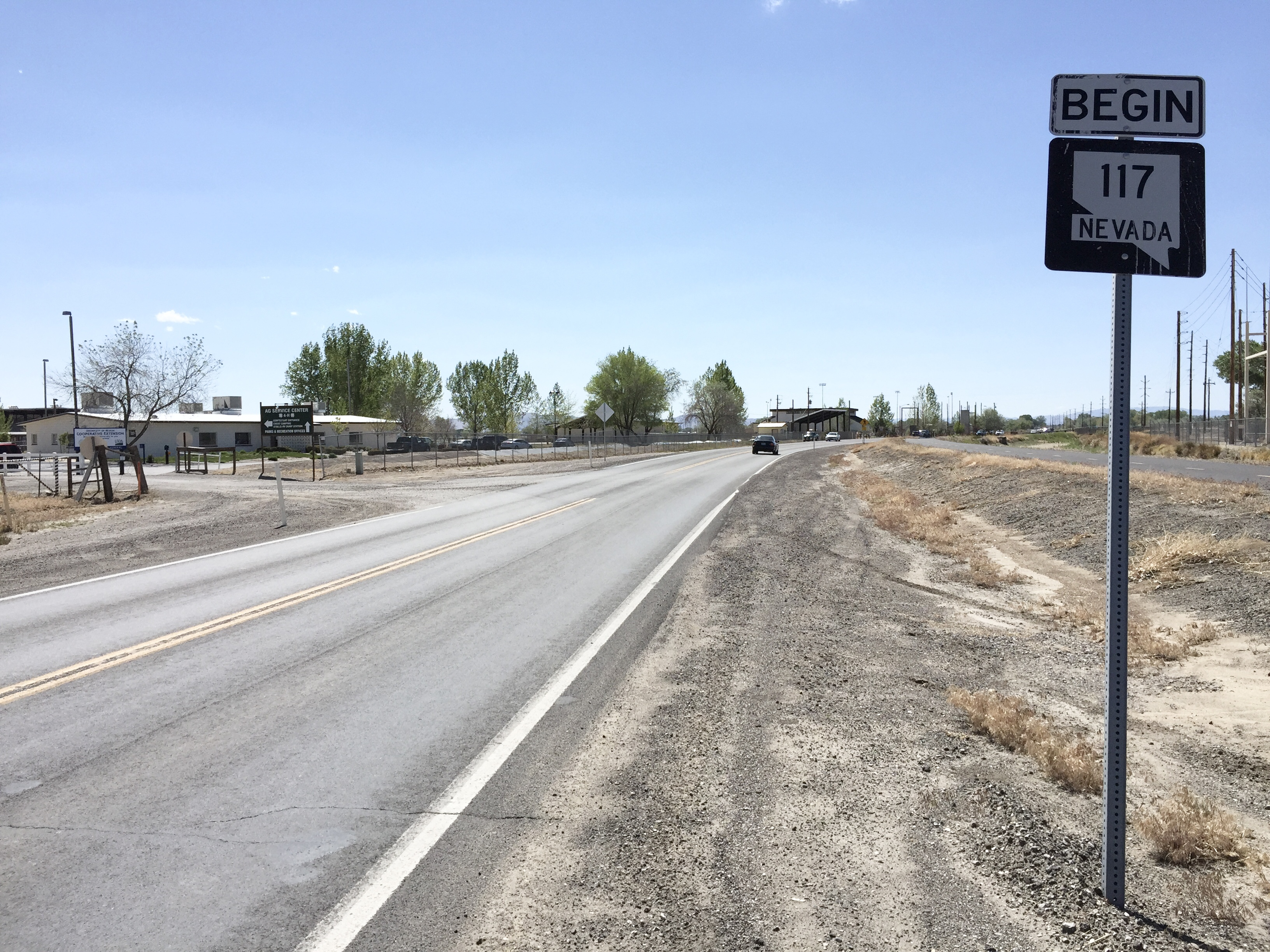
View from the east end of SR 117 looking westbound

== History ==
The easternmost approximately 1 mile (1.6 km) of Sheckler Road was previously designated as part of State Route 61. This designation was in place by 1957.

== Major intersections ==
The entire route is in Fallon, Churchill County.

mi	km	Destinations	Notes
0.00	0.00	US 50	
		McClean Lane (SR 715)	
6.91	11.12	US 95 – Hawthorne, Las Vegas	
1.000 mi = 1.609 km; 1.000 km = 0.621 mi
