= Nevada State Route 715 =

State highway in Nevada, United States

State Route 715
- McLean Road
- SR 715 highlighted in red

Route information
- Maintained by NDOT
- Length: 2.135 mi (3.436 km)

Major junctions
- South end: SR 117 southwest of Fallon
- North end: US 50 west of Fallon

Location
- Country: United States
- State: Nevada
- County: Churchill

Highway system
- Nevada State Highway System; Interstate; US; State; Pre‑1976; Scenic
← SR 671	→ SR 718

State Route 715 is a 2.135-mile-long (3.436 km) state highway in Churchill County, Nevada. It runs north from SR 117 to U.S. Route 50 west of Fallon.

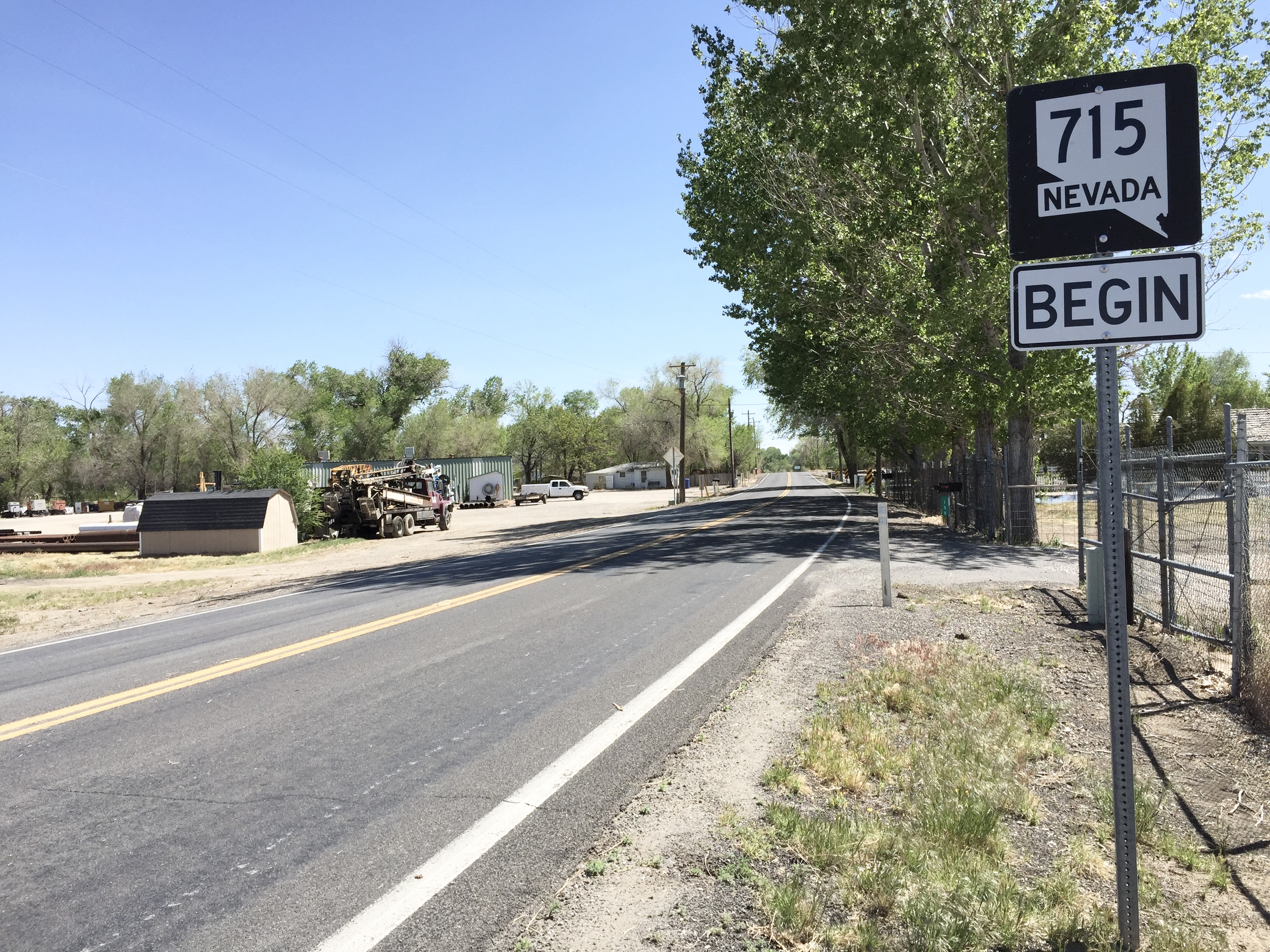
View at the north end of SR 715 looking southbound

== Major intersections ==
The entire route is in Churchill County.

Location	mi	km	Destinations	Notes
	0.000	0.000	SR 117	
	2.135	3.436	US 50	
1.000 mi = 1.609 km; 1.000 km = 0.621 mi
