= Nevada State Route 118 =

State highway in Nevada, United States

State Route 118
- Wildes Road
- State Route 118 highlighted in red.

Route information
- Maintained by NDOT
- Length: 3.475 mi (5.592 km)
- Existed: 1976–present
- History: SR 62 by 1948; Became SR 118 in 1976

Major junctions
- West end: SR 115 in Fallon
- East end: Wildes Road north of NAS Fallon

Location
- Country: United States
- State: Nevada
- Counties: Churchill

Highway system
- Nevada State Highway System; Interstate; US; State; Pre‑1976; Scenic
← SR 117	→ SR 119

State Route 118 (SR 118) is a state highway in Churchill County, Nevada. It serves the southeast portion of Fallon near northern edge of Naval Air Station Fallon. Prior to 1976, the route was designated as State Route 62.

== Route description ==
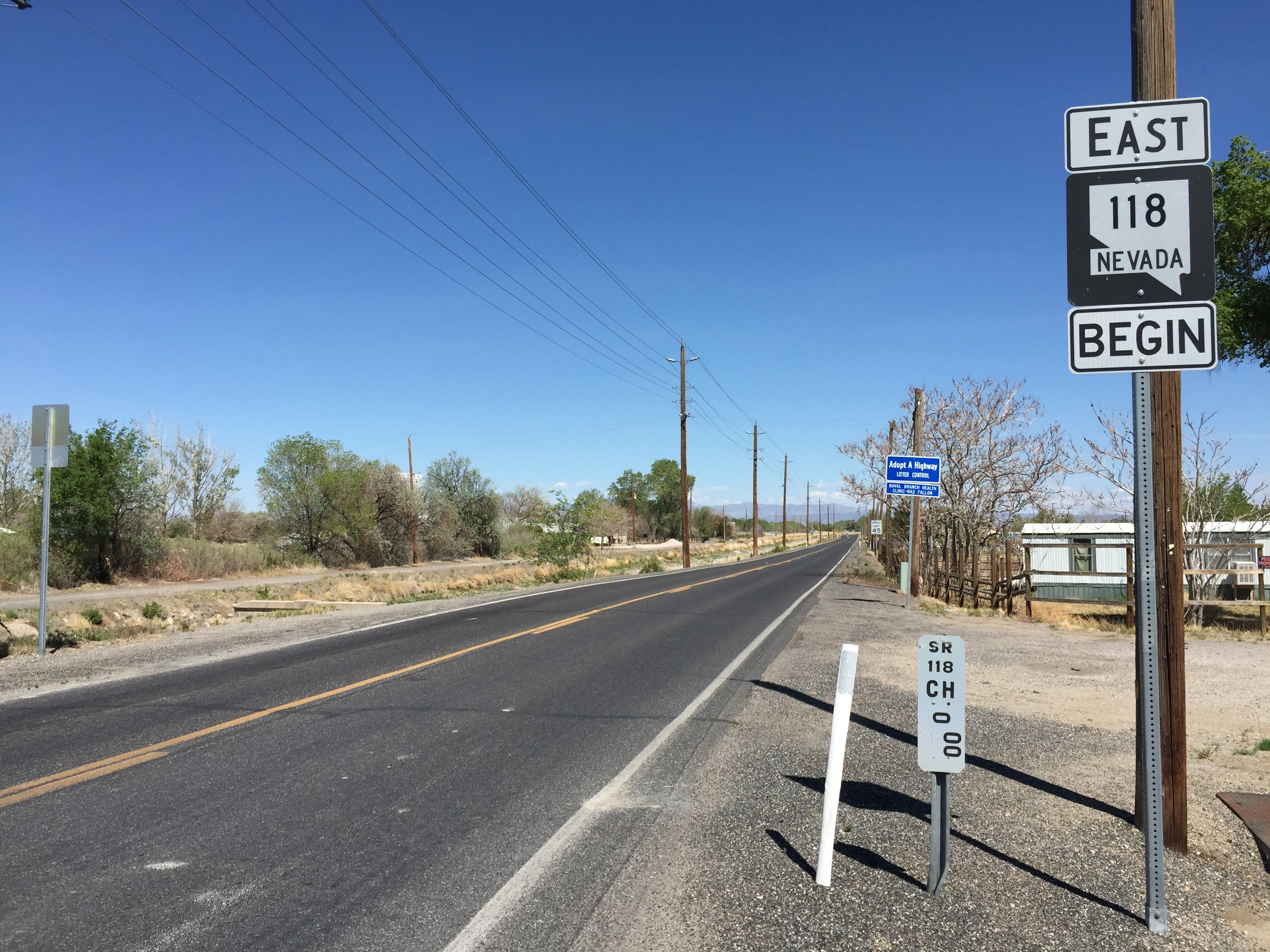
View from the west end of SR 118 looking eastbound

State Route 118 has its western terminus at the intersection of Harrigan Road and Wildes Road, near the southeastern city limits of Fallon. From there, the route heads east along Wildes Road, through predominantly agricultural areas. The route curves southeastward, and turns east again after its intersection with Pasture Road. At this point, the highway follows the northern perimeter of Naval Air Station Fallon. SR 118 reaches it eastern terminus about 1.4 miles (2.3 km) east of the Pasture Road intersection, although Wildes Road continues eastward to a junction with U.S. Route 50 (US 50).

== History ==
Wildes Road appears on maps dating back to at least 1937. State Route 62 first appeared on state highway maps in 1948, and was defined in state law (as of 1951) as "Beginning...approximately one mile south of Fallon, thence easterly one mile; thence southeasterly approximately two miles." SR 62 was shown following Wildes Road as the current route does today by 1957.

In the mid 1970s, Nevada began renumbering their state highway system. Old SR 62 became State Route 118 on July 1, 1976. The route has remained relatively unchanged since.

At one point, the route may have been part of an alignment of US 50.

== Major intersections ==
The entire route is in Churchill County.

Location	mi	km	Destinations	Notes
Fallon			SR 115 (Harrigan Road)	Western terminus
			Wildes Road	Continuation beyond eastern terminus
1.000 mi = 1.609 km; 1.000 km = 0.621 mi
