= 1872 United States presidential election in Nevada =

- November 5, 1872
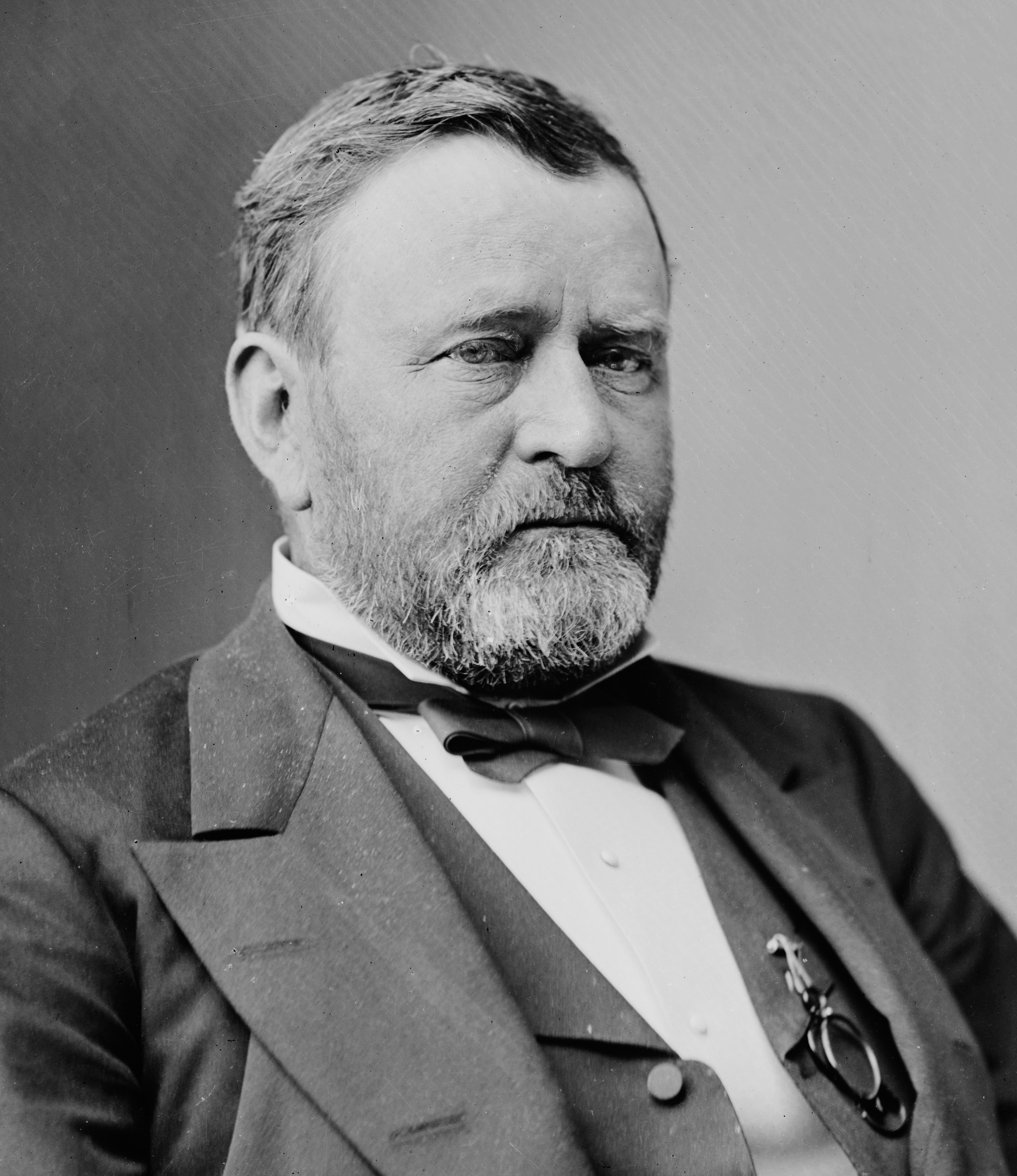

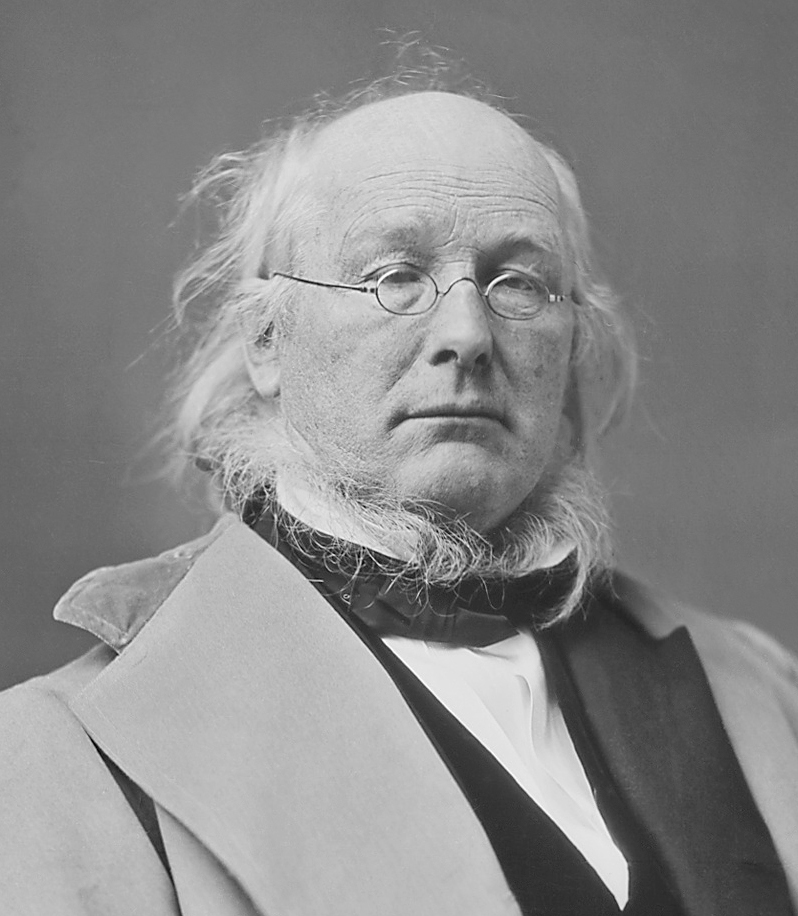
Nominee	Ulysses S. Grant	Horace Greeley
Party	Republican	Liberal Republican
Home state	Illinois	New York
Running mate	Henry Wilson	Benjamin G. Brown
Electoral vote	3	0
Popular vote	8,413	6,236
Percentage	57.43%	42.57%
County results
Grant
50–60%
60–70%
70–80%
Greeley
50–60%
President before election
Ulysses S. Grant
Republican
Elected President
Ulysses S. Grant
Republican

The 1872 United States presidential election in Nevada took place on November 5, 1872, as part of the 1872 United States presidential election. Voters chose three representatives, or electors to the Electoral College, who voted for president and vice president.

Nevada voted for the Republican candidate, Ulysses S. Grant, over Liberal Republican candidate Horace Greeley. Grant won Nevada by a margin of 14.86%. After this election, Humboldt County would not vote for a Republican candidate again until Theodore Roosevelt won it in 1904.

== Results ==
General Election Results
Party	Pledged to	Elector	Votes
Republican Party	Ulysses S. Grant	William B. Taylor	8,413
Republican Party	Ulysses S. Grant	John H. Mills	8,403
Republican Party	Ulysses S. Grant	James W. Haines	8,392
Liberal Republican Party	Horace Greeley	M. N. Stone	6,236
Liberal Republican Party	Horace Greeley	Robert M. Clarke	6,235
Liberal Republican Party	Horace Greeley	C. W. Lightner	6,232
Votes cast (Note: Based on totals for highest elector on each ticket)			14,649

=== Results by county ===
	Ulysses S. Grant Republican		Horace Greeley Liberal Republican		Margin		Total votes cast (Note: Based on highest elector on each ticket)
County	#	%	#	%	#	%	Total votes cast
Churchill	41	43.62%	53	56.38%	-12	-12.77%	94
Douglas	231	68.75%	105	31.25%	126	37.50%	336
Elko	611	52.27%	558	47.73%	53	4.53%	1,169
Esmeralda	267	56.33%	207	43.67%	60	12.66%	474
Humboldt	392	52.27%	358	47.73%	34	4.53%	750
Lander	972	51.43%	918	48.57%	54	2.86%	1,890
Lincoln	849	44.83%	1,045	55.17%	-196	-10.35%	1,894
Lyon	457	71.63%	181	28.37%	276	43.26%	638
Nye	339	53.55%	294	46.45%	45	7.11%	633
Ormsby	514	62.38%	310	37.62%	204	24.76%	824
Storey	2,603	63.89%	1,471	36.11%	1,132	27.79%	4,074
Washoe	477	62.68%	284	37.32%	193	25.36%	761
White Pine	660	59.35%	452	40.65%	208	18.71%	1,112
Totals	8,413	57.43%	6,236	42.57%	2,177	14.86%	14,649

==== Counties that flipped from Democratic to Liberal Republican ====
- Churchill (was tied)
- Lincoln

==== Counties that flipped from Democratic to Republican ====
- Nye (was tied)

== See also ==
- United States presidential elections in Nevada
