= Nevada State Route 119 =

State highway in Nevada, United States

State Route 119
- Berney Road
- Nevada State Route 119, highlighted in red.

Route information
- Maintained by NDOT
- Length: 4.137 mi (6.658 km)
- Existed: December 31, 1991–present

Major junctions
- West end: US 95 south of Fallon
- East end: Beach Road in the southwest corner of NAS Fallon

Location
- Country: United States
- State: Nevada
- Counties: Churchill

Highway system
- Nevada State Highway System; Interstate; US; State; Pre‑1976; Scenic
← SR 118	→ SR 120

State Route 119 is a state highway in Nevada, United States. It connects U.S. Route 95 east to NAS Fallon as part of Berney Road.

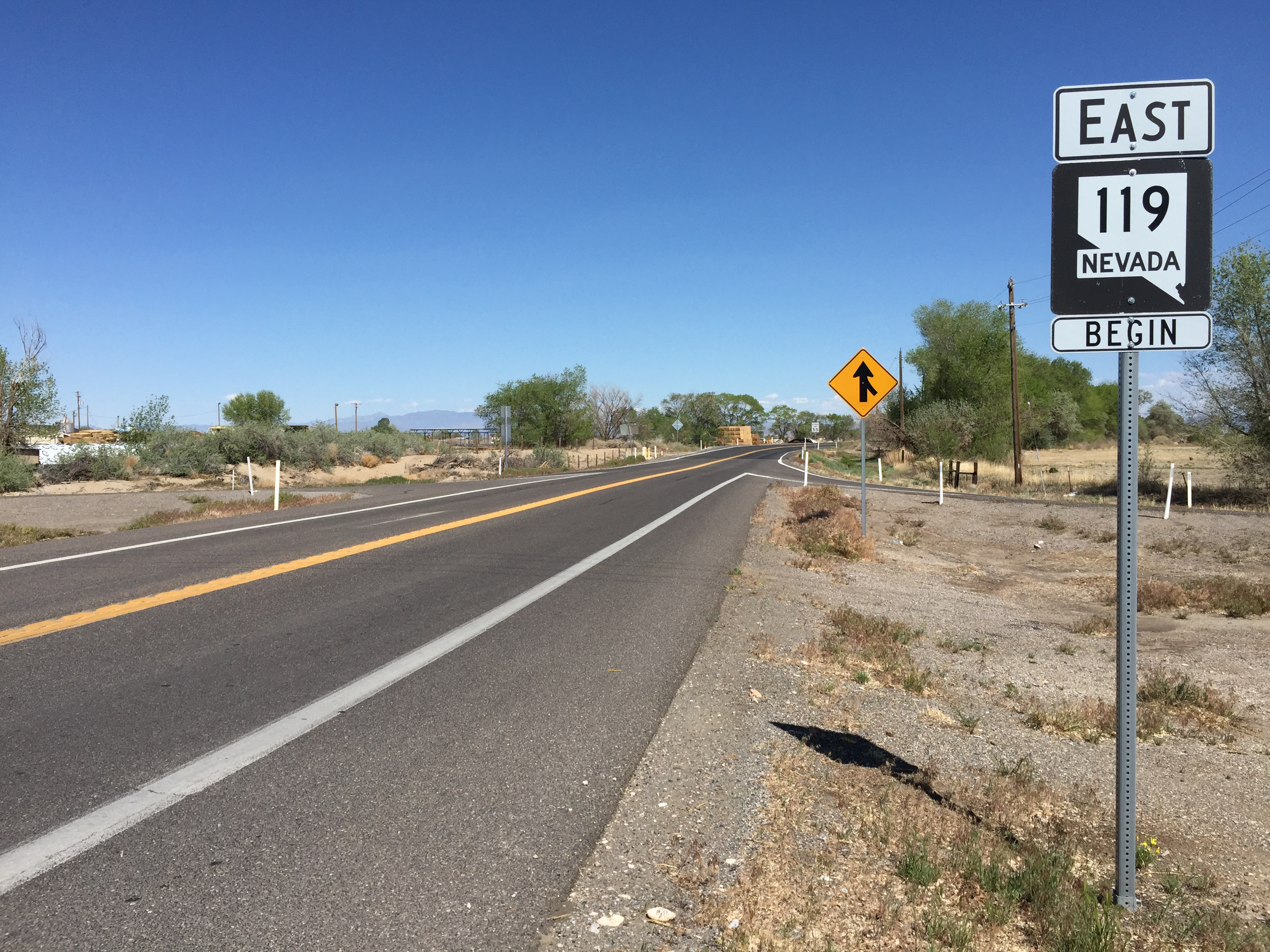
View from the west end of SR 119 looking eastbound

== Major intersections ==
The entire route is in Churchill County.

Location	mi	km	Destinations	Notes
	0.00	0.00	US 95 – Fallon, Hawthorne	
			SR 115 north (Harrigan Road)	Southern terminus of NV 115
			SR 120 south (Pasture Road)	Northern terminus of NV 120
	4.137	6.658	Beach Road	Gate to NAS Fallon
1.000 mi = 1.609 km; 1.000 km = 0.621 mi
