= Dry Lake (Churchill County, Nevada) =

- Location within Nevada Location within the United States
- Location: Churchill County, Nevada
- Coordinates: 39°35′07″N 118°27′42″W
- Type: Reservoir
- Surface elevation: 3,888 feet (1,185 m)

Dry Lake is a reservoir in the U.S. state of Nevada.

Dry Lake was named for the fact it often contained little water.
