= Melissa Melero-Moose =

Native American painter from Nevada (born 1974)

- Born: 1974 (age 51–52); San Francisco, California
- Citizenship: Paiute-Shoshone Tribe of the Fallon Reservation and Colony and American
- Education: BFA Institute of American Indian Arts, BS Portland State University
- Known for: mixed-media art, co-founder of Great Basin Native Artists
- Awards: Joan Mitchell Foundation Painters & Sculptors Grant; 2021
- Website: melissamelero.com

Melissa Melero-Moose is a Northern Paiute/Modoc mixed-media artist and co-founder of Great Basin Native Artists, a collective based in Nevada. She is enrolled in the Paiute-Shoshone Tribe of the Fallon Reservation and Colony.

== Early life and education ==
Melissa Melero-Moose was born in San Francisco, California, in 1974.

== Art career ==
Melero-Moose developed a style of abstract, mixed-media paintings that reference the landscape and culture of her Northern Paiute people. She painted with acrylic washes with layers of rice paper and natural objects, such as willow, tule, cattails, and pine nuts. Great Basin landscape, petroglyphs, and basketry inspired her work.

She specializes in visual mixed-media art and has had her work displayed through the Nevada Arts Council.

She has frequently exhibited at the Santa Fe Indian Market and Heard Museum Guild Fair & Market in Phoenix, Arizona.

== Great Basin advocacy ==
To address the invisibility of Indigenous peoples of the Great Basin in the Native American art world, Melero-Moose co-founded the Great Basin Native Artists (GBNA) collective in 2014. She has curated numerous group exhibitions of Great Basin artists, including Great Basin Native Artists (2016) at the Carson City Community Center. The Great Basin Native Arts has partnered with Stewart Indian School Cultural Center and Museum to maintain a changing art gallery featuring regional Indigenous artists.

"Indian people, even though so much of the population was wiped out, we never stopped creating," said Melero-Moose.

Beginning in 2018, the Nevada Museum of Art gave Melero-Moose a fellowship to research and create a directory and archive of Great Basin Native artists.

Melero-Moose serves on the board of the Nevada Arts Council.

== Selected exhibitions ==
- 2019: Stories from the Land: Indigenous Voices Connecting within the Great Plains, Birger Sandzén Memorial Gallery, Lindsborg, KS
- 2017–18: Connective Tissue: New Approaches to Fiber in Contemporary Native Art, IAIA Museum of Contemporary Native Arts, Santa Fe
- 2017: Great Basin Artists: Melissa Melero-Moose, Topaz Jones, Karma Henry & Jaune Quick-to-See Smith, CN Gorman Museum, Davis, CA

== Awards and honors ==
Besides winning several awards at Santa Fe Indian Market, Melero-Moose was selected by SWAIA as its Santa Fe Indian Market Discovery Fellow in 2016.

In 2015, the School for Advanced Research chose Melero-Moose as its Ronald and Susan Dubin fellow.

The Nevada Museum of Art in Reno named her the inaugural Peter E. Pool Research Fellow in 2018.
