= USS Churchill County =

United States Navy tank landing ship

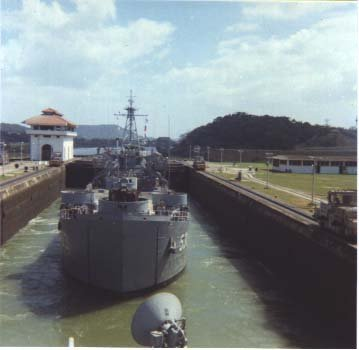
- USS Churchill County (LST-583) follows USS Walworth County (LST-1164) while transiting the Panama Canal, c. 1968

History

United States
- Name: USS LST-583, later USS Churchill County
- Namesake: Churchill County, Nevada
- Builder: Missouri Valley Bridge and Iron Company, Evansville, Indiana
- Laid down: 18 May 1944
- Launched: 5 July 1944
- Sponsored by: Mrs. D. C. Hollis
- Commissioned: 2 August 1944
- Decommissioned: March 1946
- Renamed: USS Churchill County (LST-583), 1 July 1955
- Recommissioned: 1 November 1960
- Decommissioned: September 1968
- Stricken: 15 September 1974
- Identification: IMO number: 8624187
- Honours and awards: 3 battle stars for World War II
- Fate: Sold, 1 August 1975

General characteristics
- Class & type: LST-542-class tank landing ship
- Displacement: 1,625 long tons (1,651 t) light; 4,080 long tons (4,145 t) full
- Length: 328 ft (100 m)
- Beam: 50 ft (15 m)
- Draft: Unloaded : 2 ft 4 in (0.71 m) forward; 7 ft 6 in (2.29 m) aft; Loaded : 8 ft 2 in (2.49 m) forward; 14 ft 1 in (4.29 m) aft
- Propulsion: 2 × General Motors 12-567 diesel engines, two shafts, twin rudders
- Speed: 12 knots (22 km/h; 14 mph)
- Boats & landing craft carried: 2 LCVPs
- Troops: 16 officers, 147 enlisted men
- Complement: 7 officers, 104 enlisted men
- Armament: 2 × twin 40 mm gun mounts w/Mk.51 directors; 4 × single 40 mm gun mounts; 12 × single 20 mm gun mounts

USS Churchill County (LST-583), originally USS LST-583, was an LST-542-class tank landing ship built for the United States Navy during World War II and in commission from 1944 to 1946 and 1960 to 1968. Named for Churchill County, Nevada she was the only U.S. Navy vessel to bear the name.

== Construction and commissioning ==
LST-583 was laid down on 18 May 1944 at Evansville, Indiana, by the Missouri Valley Bridge and Iron Company. She was launched on 5 July 1944, sponsored by Mrs. D. C. Hollis, and commissioned on 2 August 1944.

== First period in commission, 1944-1946 ==
During World War II, LST-583 was assigned to the Pacific Theater of Operations and participated in the Lingayen Gulf landing in January 1945, the Zambales-Subic Bay landing in January 1945, and the Mindanao Island landings in March and April 1945. Following the war, LST-583 performed occupation duty in the Far East until mid-December 1945.

LST-583 was decommissioned in March 1946. While out of commission, she was renamed USS Churchill County (LST-583) on 1 July 1955.

== Second period in commission ==
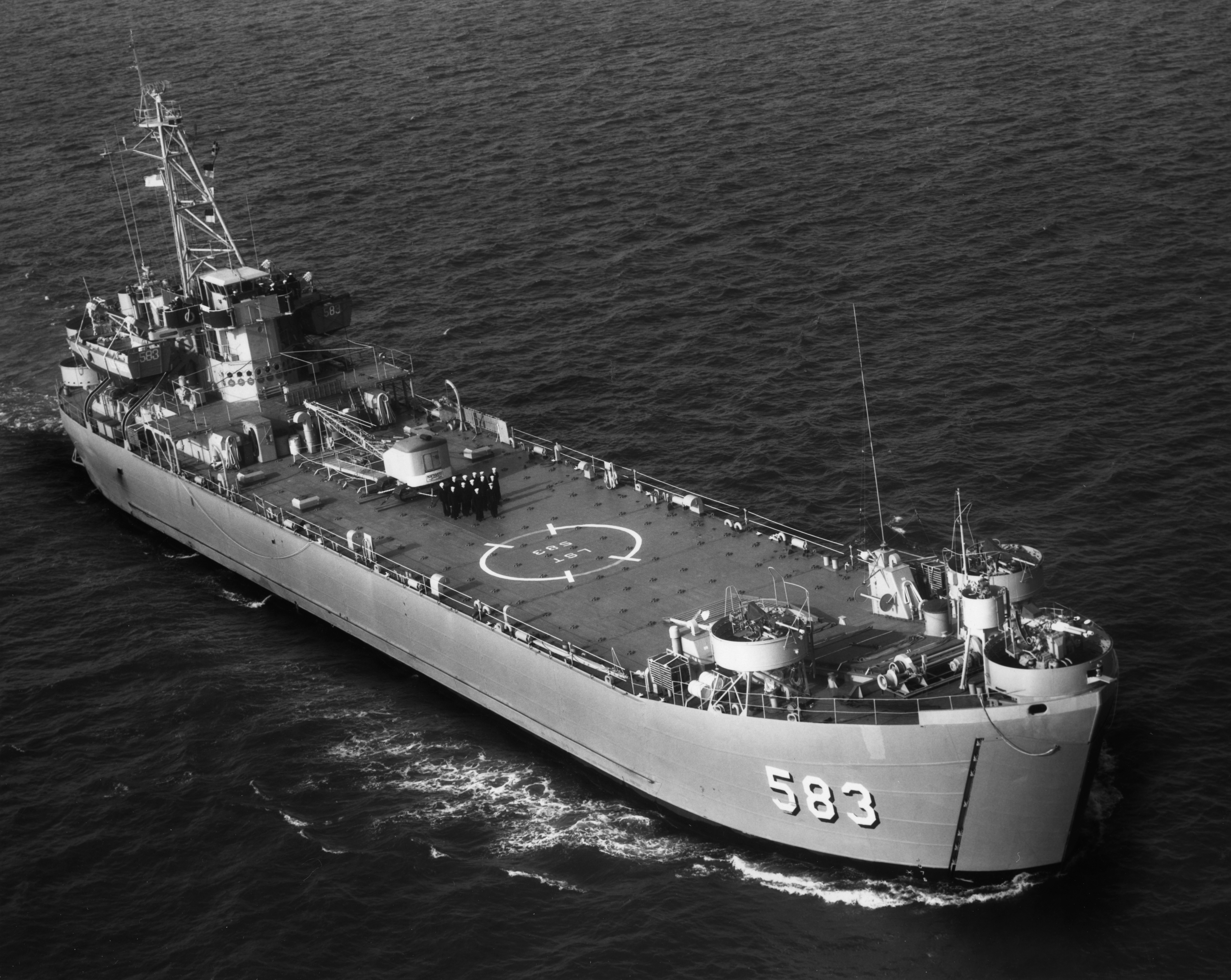
Churchill County around 1963

Churchill County was recommissioned on 1 November 1960 and served in Amphibious Force, United States Atlantic Fleet, until she was again decommissioned in September 1968.

== Disposal ==
Struck from the Naval Vessel Register on 15 September 1974, Churchill County was sold for scrapping by the Defense Reutilization and Marketing Service (DRMS) on 1 August 1975. However, she was acquired by Minerve Shipping and Trading Corporation, S.A., of Panama, renamed Petrola 131 c. 1976–1977, and placed in commercial service. Her final fate is unknown.

== Awards and honors ==
LST-583 earned three battle stars for World War II service.

== See also ==
- List of United States Navy LSTs
