= Grimes Point =

- U.S. National Register of Historic Places
- Nevada Historical Marker No. 27
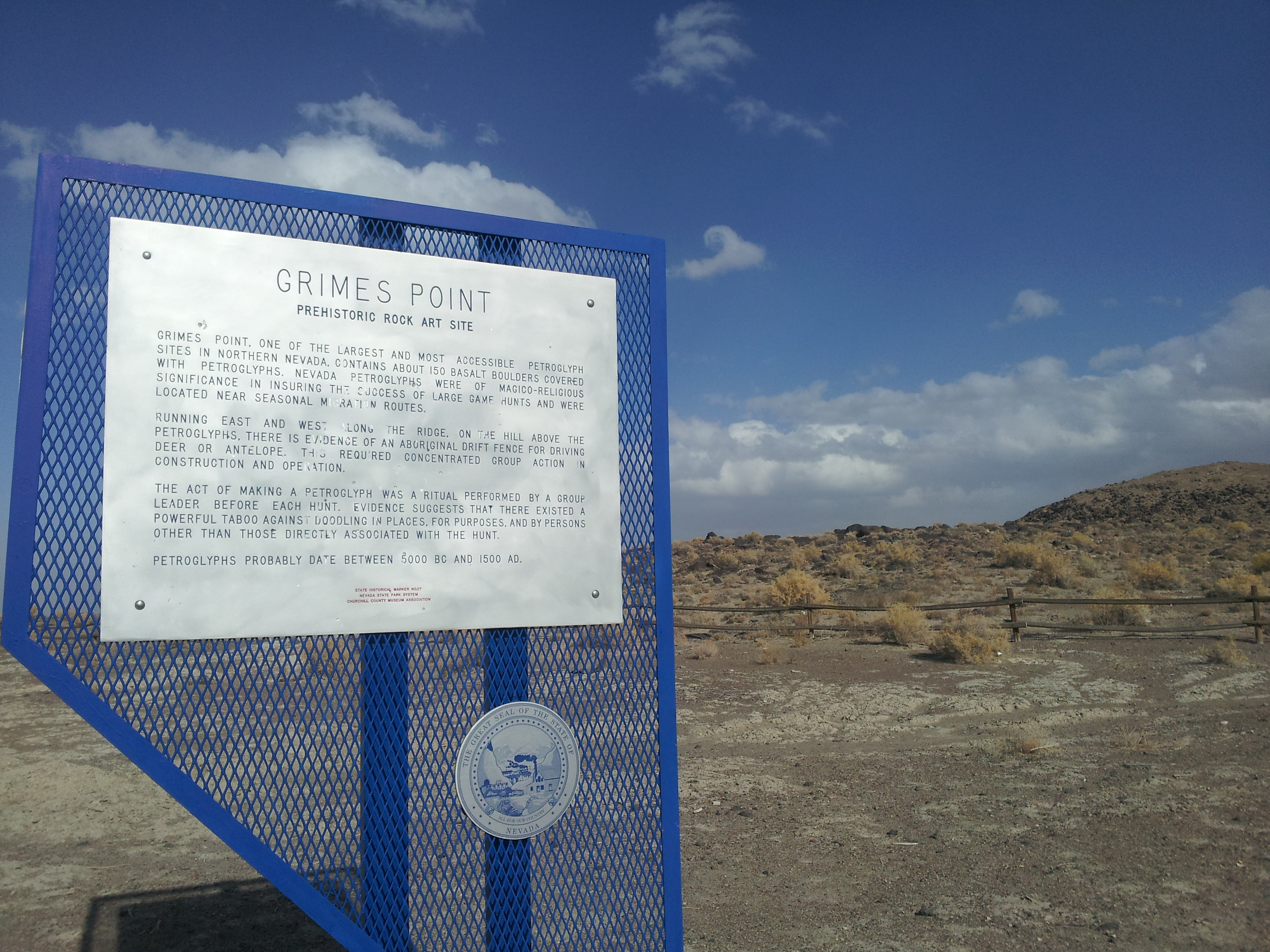
- Grimes Point, Nevada
- Nearest city: Fallon, Nevada
- Area: 720 acres (290 ha)
- NRHP reference No.: 72000763
- Marker No.: 27
- Added to NRHP: February 23, 1972

Grimes Point is a 720-acre (290 ha) archaeological site in Churchill County, Nevada, east of Fallon. Located along the former shoreline of Lake Lahontan, the site forms part of a larger archaeological landscape that includes rock shelters, petroglyph sites, and burial locations. It is known for its extensive rock art, including hundreds of cupules pecked into boulders throughout the area, and for the discovery of the Grimes Burial Shelter, which contained the remains of a child and woven matting dated to approximately 9,470 years ago.

Grimes Point was listed on the U.S. National Register of Historic Places on February 23, 1972, for its potential to yield important archaeological information. The site is managed by the Bureau of Land Management and is open to the public via the Grimes Point Trail, where numerous petroglyphs can be viewed.

== Location and environment ==
Grimes Point is located in Churchill County, Nevada, east of Fallon, on the former shoreline of Pleistocene Lake Lahontan.

Evidence of the ancient lakeshore remains visible throughout the area, including a prominent bench, or wave-cut platform, formed by the waters of Lake Lahontan.

At its greatest extent, Lake Lahontan covered much of northwestern Nevada. Changes in lake level over time altered the landscape surrounding Grimes Point and contributed to the archaeological record preserved at the site.

== Discovery ==
A small rock shelter on Grimes Point was discovered in 1939 by guano-miners; Georgia Wheeler recorded the site as 1-1C (Cave no. 16) and named it Grimes Burial Shelter. The location is to the east of Fallon, Nevada, and just to the south of the Spirit Cave, where the Spirit Cave mummy was recovered.

=== Human remains ===
The Grimes Burial Shelter contained the well-preserved remains of a child estimated to have been about ten years old at the time of death. Small fragments of a second, older individual were also recovered from the shelter. Richard Jantz and Douglas Owsley later conducted further research on these remains.

=== Archaeological complex ===
The Grimes Point site is a part of a much larger archaeological complex, which includes a wide variety of materials, caves, shelters, and other archaeological sites. The site is located on what was once a shoreline of Pleistocene Lake Lahontan and is best known for the cupules, which are small pits dug out of the rock surface and found on hundreds of boulders in the area.

This site was the primary locality used by archaeologists Robert Heizer and Martin Baumhoff to define the "Pit and Groove Style" of rock art, which is thought by many to be the oldest type of rock art found in Nevada. It does share certain characteristics with other Great Basin rock art known to be of great antiquity called Great Basin Carved Abstract. Specifically, the depth of engraving and the width of the engraved lines are much greater than other rock art types that appear to be of more recent manufacture, a characteristic also noted elsewhere.

Archaeologist Karen Nissen included Grimes Point in her analyses of rock art sites in western Nevada and concluded that rock art was generally associated with hunting locales, an idea popular at that time but somewhat less so today.

== Management and public access ==
Grimes Point was listed on the National Register of Historic Places on February 23, 1972, because of its potential to provide important archaeological information.

The site is managed by the Bureau of Land Management and is open to the public year-round. Located along U.S. Route 50 east of Fallon, it can be explored by way of the Grimes Point Trail, where numerous petroglyphs can be viewed.

The site is located off U.S. 50 east of Fallon and open to the public year-round.

== Gallery ==
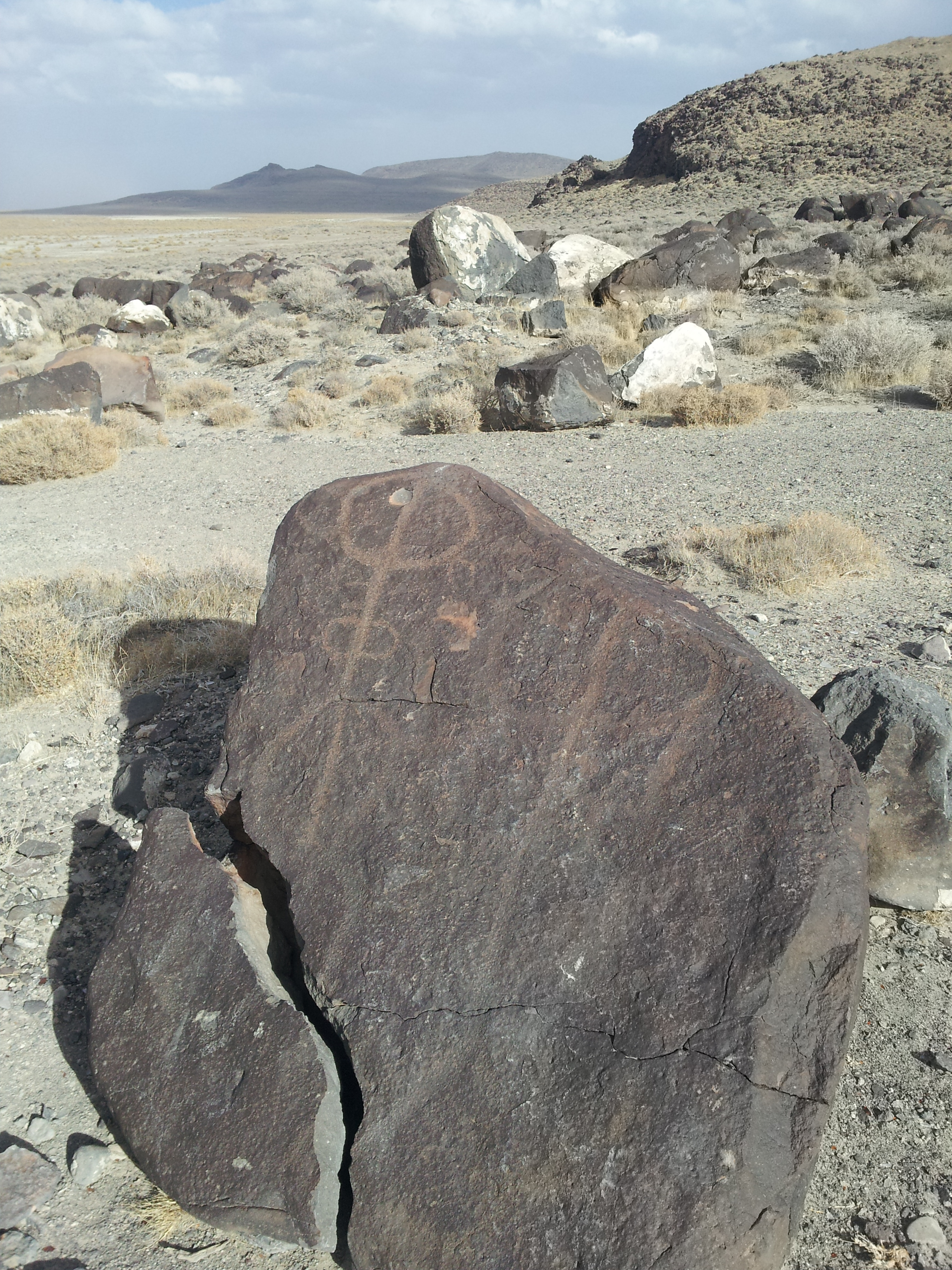
The ancient shoreline, bench (geology) or wave-cut platform, of Lake Lahontan may be seen in the background

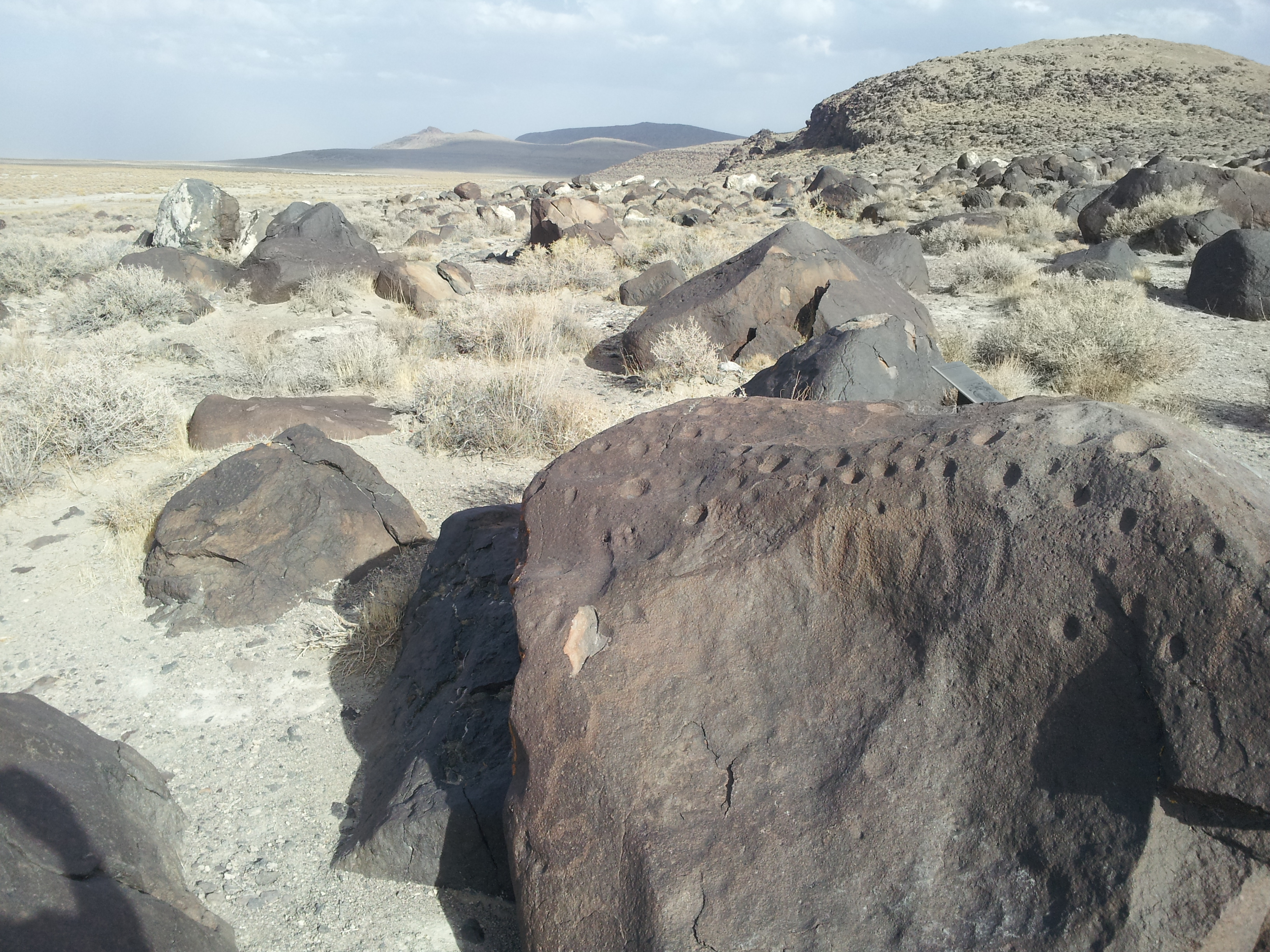
Petroglyphs at Grimes Point, Nevada
