= Nevada State Route 718 =

State highway in Nevada, United States

State Route 718
- Curry Road; Lone Tree Road
- SR 718 highlighted in red

Route information
- Maintained by NDOT
- Length: 2.942 mi (4.735 km)

Major junctions
- West end: Curry Road
- East end: US 95 south of Fallon

Location
- Country: United States
- State: Nevada
- Counties: Churchill

Highway system
- Nevada State Highway System; Interstate; US; State; Pre‑1976; Scenic
← SR 715	→ SR 720

State Route 718 is a 2.903-mile-long (4.672 km) state highway in Churchill County, Nevada. It runs west from US 95 south of Fallon.

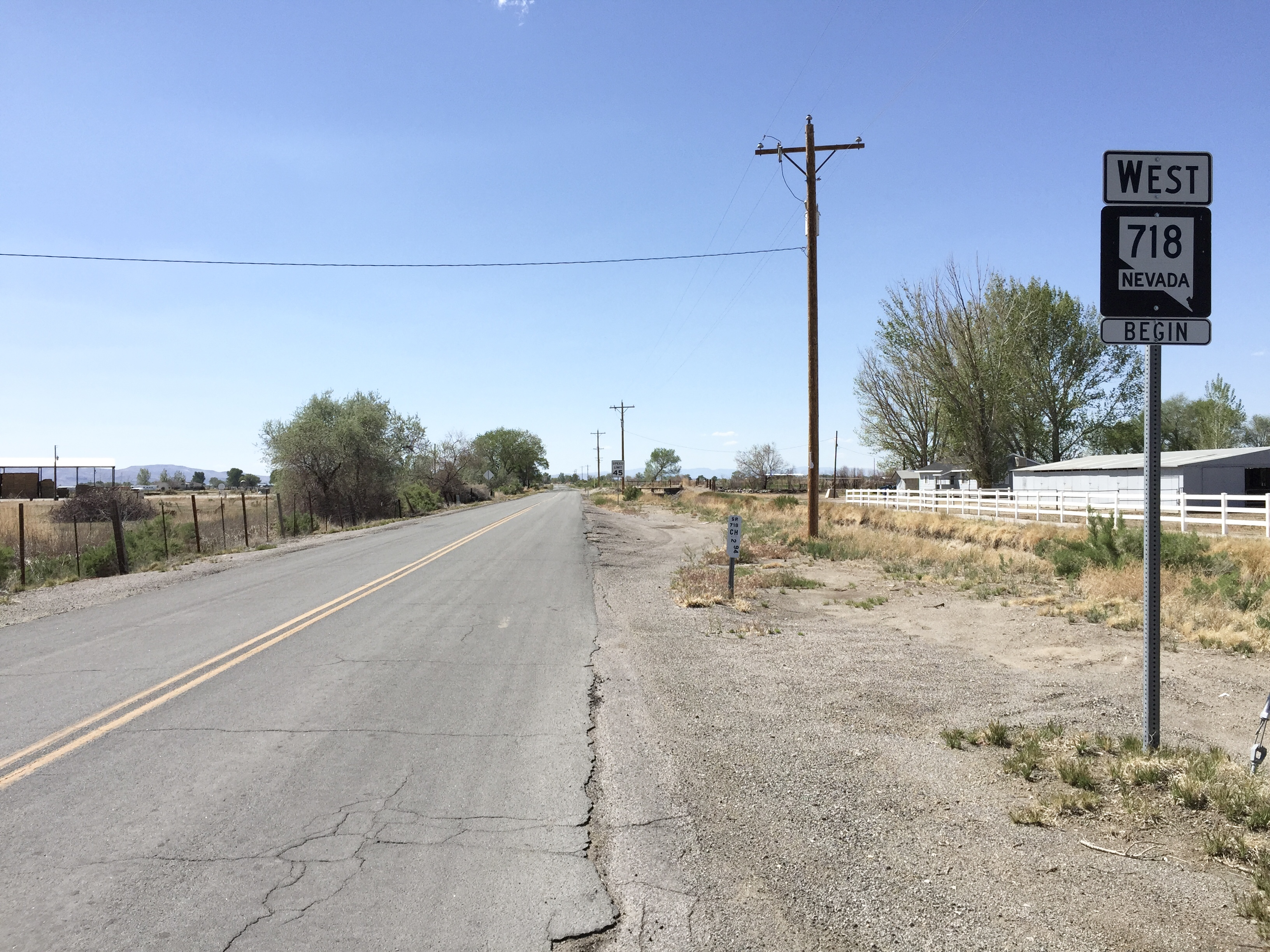
View at the east end of SR 718 looking westbound

== Major intersections ==
The entire route is in Churchill County.

Location	mi	km	Destinations	Notes
	0.000	0.000	Curry Road	Continuation past western end
	0.893	1.437	Lone Tree Road	SR 718 changes from a north–south to an east–west orientation
	2.942	4.735	US 95 – Fallon, Las Vegas	
1.000 mi = 1.609 km; 1.000 km = 0.621 mi
