= Stillwater Slough =

Stream in Nevada, U.S.

Coordinates: 39°33′56″N 118°31′33″W

Stillwater Slough is a stream in the U.S. state of Nevada. Stillwater Slough was named for the fact it often contains stagnant water.
