= Mineral Hill, New South Wales =

Former mining village now ghost town

Coordinates: 32°35′10.8″S 146°59′01.0″E

Mineral Hill was a mining village in the Central West region of New South Wales, Australia. It is now a ghost town, but its name is still used in connection with the adjacent mining field. For postal and statistical purposes, its former site is now treated as a part of Condobolin, although it is 60 km (37 mi) by road from that town.

== Before mining ==
The area that was called Mineral Hill lies on the traditional lands of Wiradjuri people. There is a carved tree in the area. Carving trees is a cultural practice of Wiradjuri people.

== Mining ==
The Mineral Hill mining field is part of the Lachlan Fold Belt, and consists of various copper, gold, lead, zinc and silver sulphide deposits. The deposits lie in the parish of Talingaboolba, County of Kennedy. Where the deposits outcropped or were shallow, there were weathered zones of oxide and carbonate ores. The field remains a source of mineral specimens, particularly azurite and malachite, but also specimens of cerussite, cuprite and silver halides. Numerous mines and shafts have existed in the area. The Mineral Hill field lay in the north-eastern extremity of a larger area, which was referred to as Melrose, after a local homestead; earlier mines within that larger area included the Melrose Copper and Silver mine, which operated from 1882 and sporadically until 1916, the Anaconda Mine and the Big Ben Mine.

The landform that gave the village and mining field their name was an iron-capped outcrop. The deposit at Mineral Hill, it was reported, had been discovered more or less accidentally, by William McClure. A mining lease was taken out in 1908, and shallow prospecting shafts sunk on Mineral Hill. Gossan mined there contained 65 ozs of silver to the ton, and the area also showed copper carbonates and galena. Nearby was another iron-capped outcrop, Parker's Hill. In 1911, a shaft was sunk at Parker's Hill.

In October 1912, a new and larger company— Iodide (Mineral Hill) Ltd, with capital of £150,000, made up of 15,000 shares of £10 each—was set up to own and operate the Mineral Hill Mine, subsequently known as the Iodide Mine, after the new company. One of its directors was George Blakemore. The company bought the mine from its owner, local grazier, Charles McPhillamy, for £50,000.

By late 1912, deeper mining encountered a variable ore body; lead grades from 4% to 42%, silver from 2 to 1,000 ozs per ton, with gold in some places, which varied between 2 and 10 dwt per ton. By June 1914, the mine was down to 250 feet but around 2,500 gallons of water needed to be pumped from the mine workings, every hour.

Remoteness was an issue from the earliest days of mining. By September 1912, the newly-renamed Iodide Mine had extracted 3,000 tons of ore but only 1,200 tons was economic to ship to smelters. The ore to be shipped was placed in hessian bags, and then carried on carts pulled by teams to the nearest railway at Condobolin. Transport costs dictated that only the richest ore would be dispatched for smelting at Cockle Creek, Port Kembla, or Port Pyrie.

Around December 1913, the Iodide Mine stopped shipping ore, and concentrated upon further development of the mine. At the outbreak of the First World War, in August 1914, the Iodide Mine closed, but it reopened around April 1915. The nearby Block 9 Mine continued in operation during this period.

In late 1915, it was reported that equipment that could treat the ore on site was arriving at Mineral Hill, and the directors of the Iodide Mine reported an optimistic outlook to shareholders. A concentrator jig was being used, by May 1916, at the Iodide Mine. The intention was to concentrate and so upgrade ore that was not quite up to the ore grade that had been bagged for dispatch to the smelter. There was also a mill, with 'crushing rolls'—also known as Cornish rolls—and a 'mill dam' to provide water for the process. The mill broke down in September 1916, which was also around when the Iodide Mine closed for the last time. However, it seems that there was never any on site smelting or flotation plant there, and ore mined at Mineral Hill continued to be sent for smelting elsewhere, into the 1920s.

In 1916, the company operating the Block 9 went into liquidation and its workings were purchased by and combined with those of the Iodide mine, making the expanded Iodide Mine operations by far the largest on the field. Miners at the Iodide Mine received a pay increase, to a minimum of 10 shillings and 6 pence per shift, in August 1916.

The Iodide Mine closed around September 1916. The company that was operating it voted to wind itself up, in June 1917. The liquidator sought tenders to purchase the mine in August 1917. By then, the Iodide mine was at 350 feet, with good copper and lead-zinc ores, but smelter and other charges had taken 64% of the value of the minerals produced. Directors reported that these charges were a factor in the failure of the company, as were the increased cost of labour and the falling ore grades as the mine went deeper. However, the directors stated that the most significant factor of all were restrictions on the sales of ore and concentrates to foreign buyers, which had been imposed by the government.

== Mining village ==
A village came into existence, immediately to the south of the mining area. A postmaster was appointed in October 1912, in anticipation of the opening of a post office. A sawmill was erected in anticipation of timber being needed for construction. However, a delay in surveying the village frustrated some wanting to set up businesses or build residences there.

The village was proclaimed in July 1913. By then, there were reported to be around sixty school-aged children, without access to a school, within a two mile radius. A school and police presence were being sought in 1913. There was a school there between March 1914 and March 1920. A butcher set up a branch there in 1912. In the years from 1914 to 1916, the village had a store named Showman Brothers. In 1916, there was a licence for a venue for billiards there.

Two applications for provisional hotel licences were made by 1915, but the village seems to have begun to decline before any hotel did actually open there. There was however an existing hotel, the Melrose Hotel, at the nearby Anaconda mine site, around six miles from the village. That hotel had been destroyed by fire in 1899, but was rebuilt. It was operating in 1912, through to at least 1919.

The closing of its main mine, the Iodide Mine, in September 1916, heavily impacted the small village, with some miners leaving for other places, while others took up prospecting in the area.

Seven men returned to Mineral Hill, from World War 1. In September 1919, a social event was held to welcome the last two of them home.

== Decline and aftermath ==
After the end of World War 1, the base metals markets were in a state of oversupply. The Iodide Mine was worked by tribute miners in the years prior to 1923, when there was talk that the mine would reopen. In 1919, the Rose Hill Copper Mine—also known as the Blind Calf Mine—was being mined by the same tribute miners, who were sending small quantities of copper ore for treatment at the ER & S smelter at Port Kembla. A company operating the Block 9 Mine was being wound up in 1919.

The hotel at Melrose—newly-renamed the Three Peel Hotel—was still in operation, up to March 1926, when its reportedly fully-insured building was destroyed by fire, around a year after its licensee changed. It was not rebuilt.

Although it was still a polling place for the 1927 New South Wales state elections, the village faded away completely. Mining did continue in the area on a smaller scale, as late as the 1950s. The dedication of the school site was revoked in 1967.

== Later mining activity ==
There was a later period of mining activity on the mineral field. Part of the old village site was included within a mining lease for copper exploration in 1976, and an open cut copper mine operated at Mineral Hill until the 1990s. The larger modern mine site includes the former locations of some of the earlier mines. An underground gold mine operated in the area in the late 1990s and 2000s. As of November 2025, there were no mines operating at Mineral Hill, but the area remains of interest for exploration for minerals.
