= Hot Springs, Manicaland =

Thermal springs

Hot springs are located 80 km south of Mutare in Zimbabwe. It is located near Nyanyadzi and Chiyadzwa diamond fields. The water from the springs is said to have medicinal and healing properties.

The geographic coordinates are: 19°39′01″S 32°28′01″E

In 2021, the District Council of Chimanimani set priorities to complete the Hotsprings Clinic in Manicaland which will serve thousands of people who live in the surrounding area.

== See also ==
- List of hot springs
