= Paiute-Shoshone Tribe of the Fallon Reservation and Colony =

Federally recognized Native American tribe

Fallon Paiute-Shoshone
Toi Dükadü

Total population
- 900 enrolled members (1990), 620 on reservation (2000)

Regions with significant populations
- United States ( Nevada)

Languages
- Northern Paiute language, English

Religion
- Native American Church, Sun Dance, Jehovah Witness, Traditional tribal religion, Christianity, Ghost Dance

Related ethnic groups
- Other Northern Paiute and Western Shoshone tribes

The Paiute-Shoshone Tribe of the Fallon Reservation and Colony is a federally recognized tribe of Northern Paiute and Western Shoshone Indians in Churchill County, Nevada. Their autonym is Toi Dükadü meaning "Cattail Eaters."

== Reservations ==
Location of the Fallon Paiute-Shoshone Reservation

Location of the Fallon Paiute-Shoshone Colony

The Fallon Paiute-Shoshone Tribe has a federal reservation, the Fallon Paiute-Shoshone Reservation, at 39°31′16″N 118°37′03″W, in Churchill County. The reservation, established in 1887, comprises 5,540 acres (22.4 km^{2}). In 2005, 1,692 people lived on the reservation. In 2017, 1,499 people were enrolled in the tribe. Closer to the city of Fallon the smaller and geographically detached Fallon Paiute-Shoshone Colony, at 39°29′05″N 118°45′38″W, has two separate sections that lie between downtown Fallon and Fallon Municipal Airport, northeast of the city.

== Governance ==
As of 2009 the Fallon Paiute Shoshone Tribe's headquarters is located in Fallon, Nevada. The tribe is governed by a seven-person tribal council, with Len George serving as the Tribal Chairperson as of 2009.

== Media ==
Numa News is the tribe's monthly newspaper.

== Notable tribal members ==
- Melissa Melero-Moose, mixed-media artist, curator
