= Hot Springs, Nevada =

Former town in Nevada, U.S.

Hot Springs is located in Nye County, just north of Beatty, Nevada. In the early 1900s, the Las Vegas & Tonopah Railroad Company and the Bullfrog Goldfield Railroad stopped at a station in Hot Springs.

There is now nothing left of the old town, but the hot springs remain, and Bailey's Hot Springs RV Park is open on the site as of January 2018.

Note that there is also a ghost town named Hot Springs near Mineral Hill, Nevada in Eureka County, Nevada.
