= Carson Lake (Ontario) =

Carson Lake in Ontario, Canada may refer to one of six lakes of that name:

- Carson Lake in Algoma District, NTS map sheet 41J02
- Carson Lake in Bruce County, NTS map sheet 41A11
- Carson Lake in Hastings County, NTS map sheet 31C12
- Carson Lake in Parry Sound District, NTS map sheet 41H09
- Carson Lake in Renfrew County, NTS map sheet 31F12
- Carson Lake in Thunder Bay District, NTS map sheet 52B08

There is also a Little Carson Lake in Parry Sound District, NTS map sheet 41H09.
