= Mineral Hill, Nevada =

- Ghost town
- Location within Nevada Location within the United States
- Coordinates: 40°09′36″N 116°05′49″W
- Country: United States
- State: Nevada
- County: Eureka
- Elevation: 6,368 ft (1,941 m)

Mineral Hill is a ghost town in Eureka County, Nevada, US.

Silver, lead and copper were discovered there in June 1869. In the early 1870s, there were almost 450 residents.

Initially, the Reese River process was used to process the ore, which includes roasting the ore with salt before using the Washoe process. A fifteen stamp mill was built in 1871 using the Reese River process with excellent results, though it was later found that good results would occur with just the Washoe process. Peak production of US$701,000 (equivalent to $18,839,000 in 2025) occurred in 1871. In 1872, the company that built the mill failed because the it was not able to supply sufficient ore. Lien holders operated the mill for a few years, by 1872 production was estimated at US$25,000 (equivalent to $672,000 in 2025). Between 1913 and 1938, production was estimated to be only US$25,000 (equivalent to $572,000 in 2025).

A Post Office was in operation from May 1871 to July 1888, then from February 1889 to July 1890 and finally from February 1902 to Apr 1914.

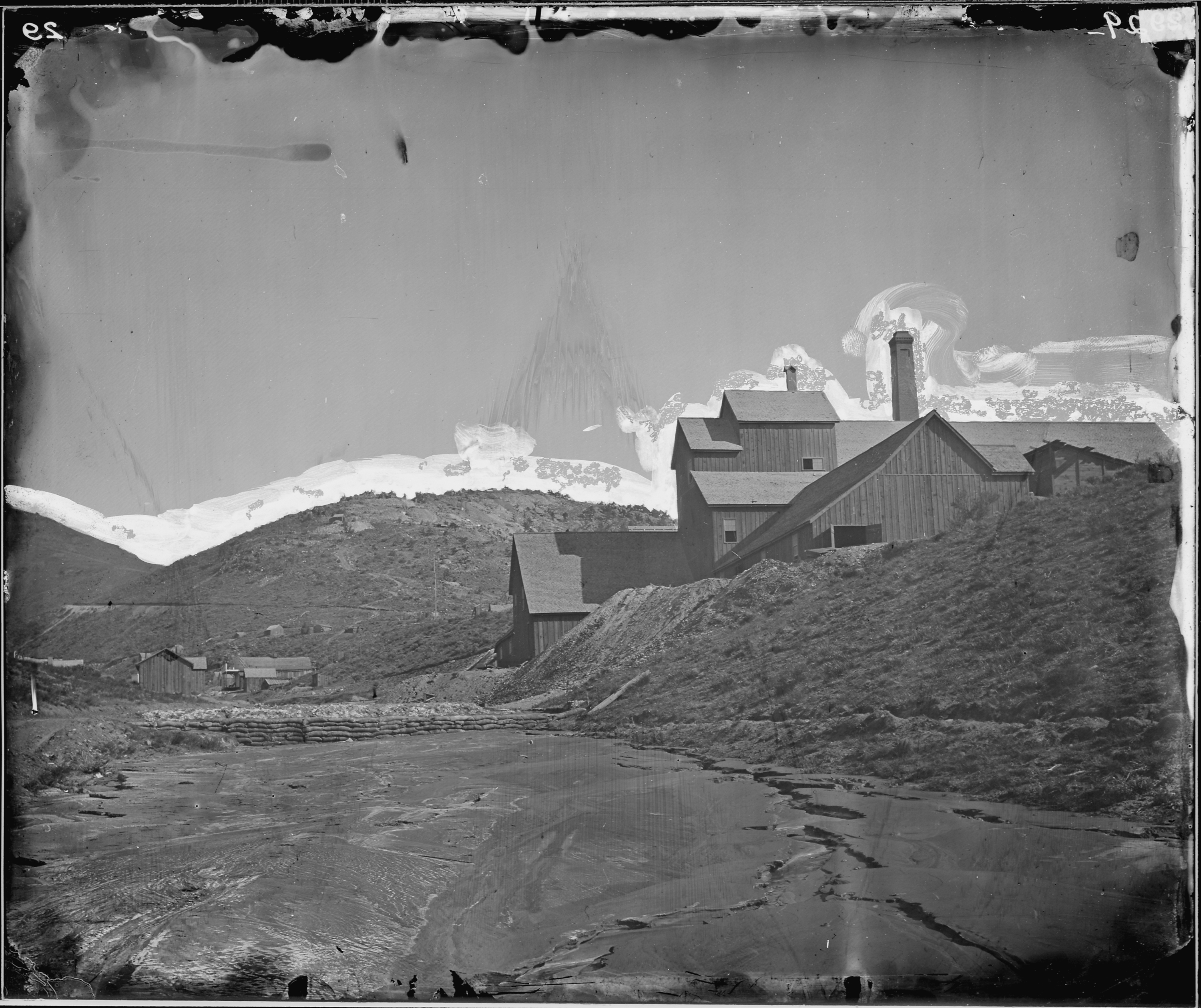
Fifteen Stamp Mill at Mineral Hill, Nevada (1871).

== Hot Springs ==
Hot Springs is smaller ghost town, located four miles north of Mineral Hill.

The water of the spring is very rich in minerals and was to help people with several diseases. An early owner, Dr. Davenport, built a large bathhouse at the springs and renamed it White Sulphur Springs. That springs was mainly used by miners from Mineral Hill. When Mineral Hill began to weaken, the business decelerated. The owner of the springs closed up shop in the mid-1870s.
