= Stillwater National Wildlife Refuge =

- IUCN category IV (habitat/species management area)
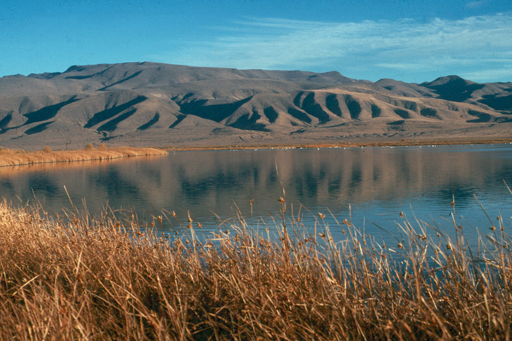

- Location within the United States
- Location: Churchill County, Nevada, United States
- Nearest city: Fallon, Nevada
- Coordinates: 39°32′30″N 118°29′26″W
- Area: 79,570 acres (322.0 km^{2})
- Established: 1949
- Governing body: U.S. Fish and Wildlife Service
- Website: Stillwater National Wildlife Refuge

Stillwater National Wildlife Refuge is a National Wildlife Refuge of the United States in Nevada. It is located in the Lahontan Valley, near the community of Fallon, sixty miles east of Reno. It was established in 1949 and encompasses 79,570 acres (322.0 km^{2}).

The Stillwater wetlands are well known to birders, as this area has been designated a site of international importance by the Western Hemispheric Shorebird Reserve Network because of the hundreds of thousands of shorebirds, such as long-billed dowitcher, black-necked stilt, and American avocet passing through during migration.

Also listed as a 'Globally Important Bird Area' by the American Bird Conservancy, more than 280 species have been sighted in the area. These rich and diverse wetlands attract more than a quarter million waterfowl, as well as over 20,000 other water birds, including American white pelicans, double-crested cormorants, white-faced ibis, and several species of egrets, herons, gulls, and terns.
