= Churchill County, Nevada =

County in Nevada, United States

- County
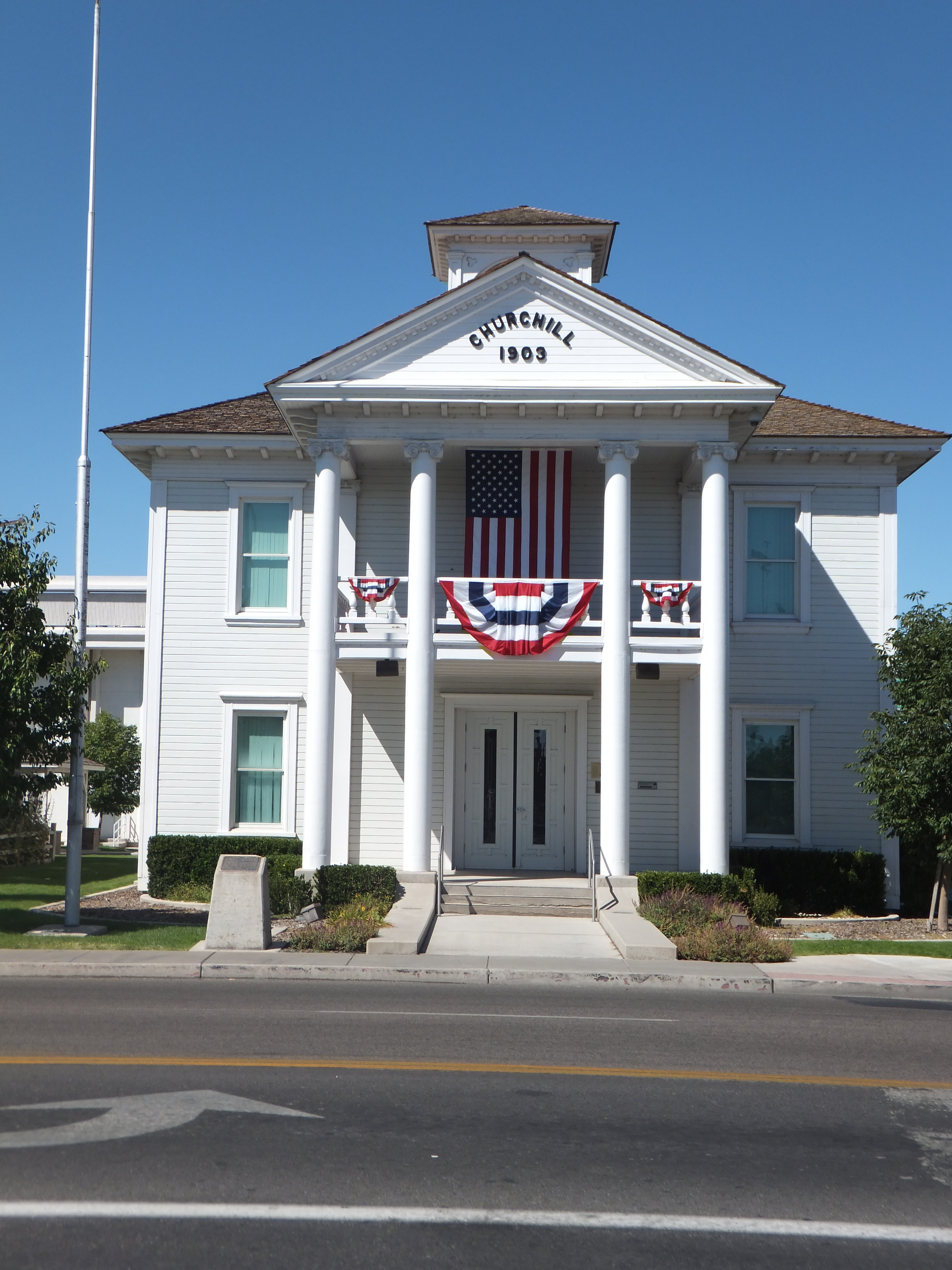
- Churchill County Courthouse in Fallon

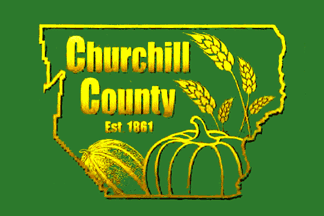
- Flag Seal

- Location within the U.S. state of Nevada
- Coordinates: 39°36′N 118°20′W
- Country: United States
- State: Nevada
- Created: 1861; 165 years ago
- Organized: 1864; 162 years ago
- Named for: Sylvester Churchill
- Seat: Fallon
- Largest city: Fallon

Area
  - Total: 5,024 sq mi (13,010 km^{2})
  - Land: 4,930 sq mi (12,800 km^{2})
  - Water: 94 sq mi (240 km^{2}) 1.9%

Population (2020)
  - Total: 25,516
  - Estimate (2025): 25,851 ▲
  - Density: 5.18/sq mi (2.00/km^{2})
- Time zone: UTC−8 (Pacific)
  - Summer (DST): UTC−7 (PDT)
- Area code: 775
- Congressional district: 2nd
- Website: www.churchillcountynv.gov

Churchill County is a county in the western U.S. state of Nevada. As of the 2020 census, the population was 25,516. Its county seat is Fallon. Named for Mexican–American War hero brevet Brigadier General Sylvester Churchill, the county was formed in 1861. Churchill County comprises the Fallon, NV Micropolitan Statistical Area. It is in northwestern Nevada. Churchill County is noteworthy in that it owns and operates the local telephone carrier, Churchill County Communications.

== History ==
Churchill County was established in 1861, and was named for Fort Churchill (which is now in Lyon County), which was named for General Sylvester Churchill, a Mexican–American War hero who was Inspector General of the U.S. Army in 1861. Churchill County was not organized until 1864, and its first county seat was Bucklands (which is now in Lyon County). In 1864 the county seat was moved to La Plata, Nevada; on November 8, 1867 it was moved to Stillwater, Nevada; and on January 1, 1904, it was settled in its present position, Fallon. In the 19th century there were several attempts to eliminate Churchill County because of its small population, but Assemblyman Lemuel Allen stopped it on all occasions including convincing the Governor to veto an 1875 bill after it had been passed by both houses.

=== Railroads ===
The Eagle Salt Works Railroad ran for 13.5 miles (21.7 km), primarily on the original Central Pacific grade from Luva (2 miles (3.2 km) east of Fernley) to Eagle Salt Works.

The Central Pacific portion of the nation's first transcontinental railroad ran through Churchill County, although a portion of the original route has been shifted for a new route south of Wadsworth in favor of Fernley. The Central Pacific later became the Southern Pacific Railroad which was merged into Union Pacific in 1996.

== Geography ==
The terrain of Churchill County consists of rugged mountainous ridges, dotted with lakes and ponds. The county's east and west sides are higher than the intermediate valley; its highest point around the county periphery is a ridge on the lower east boundary line, at 9,380 ft (2,860 m) ASL. The county has an area of 5,024 square miles (13,010 km^{2}), of which 4,930 square miles (12,800 km^{2}) is land and 94 square miles (240 km^{2}) (1.9%) is water. The county's highest point is Desatoya Peak at 9,977 ft (3,041 m), while the most topographically prominent peak is Mount Augusta, at 9,970 ft (3,040 m) ASL.

=== Major highways ===
- Interstate 11 (Future)
- Interstate 80
- U.S. Route 50
- U.S. Route 50 Alternate
- U.S. Route 95
- U.S. Route 95 Alternate
- State Route 115
- State Route 116
- State Route 117
- State Route 118
- State Route 119
- State Route 120
- State Route 121
- State Route 361
- State Route 715
- State Route 718
- State Route 720
- State Route 722
- State Route 723
- State Route 726
- State Route 839

=== Adjacent counties ===
- Lyon County – west
- Washoe County – northwest
- Pershing County – north
- Lander County – east
- Nye County – southeast
- Mineral County – south

=== Protected areas ===
- Fallon National Wildlife Refuge
- Humboldt State Wildlife Management Area
- Lahontan State Game Refuge
- Lahontan State Recreation Area (partial)
- Sand Mountain Recreation Area
- Stillwater National Wildlife Refuge

=== Lakes and reservoirs ===
- Big Water
- Carson Lake
- Cattail Lake
- Division Lake
- Dog Head Pond
- Dry Lake
- Dutch Bill Lake
- East Alkali Lake Number One
- East Alkali Lake Number Two
- Foxtail Lake
- Goose Lake
- Humboldt Lake (partial)
- Lahontan Reservoir
- Little Soda Lake
- North Nutgrass Lake
- Pintail Bay
- Scheckler Reservoir
- Soda Lake
- Stillwater Point Reservoir
- Swan Check
- Swan Lake
- Tule Lake
- West Nutgrass
- Willow Lake

== Demographics ==
Historical population
Census	Pop.	Note	%±
1870	196		—
1880	479		144.4%
1890	703		46.8%
1900	830		18.1%
1910	2,811		238.7%
1920	4,649		65.4%
1930	5,075		9.2%
1940	5,317		4.8%
1950	6,161		15.9%
1960	8,452		37.2%
1970	10,513		24.4%
1980	13,917		32.4%
1990	17,938		28.9%
2000	23,982		33.7%
2010	24,877		3.7%
2020	25,516		2.6%
2025 (est.)	25,851	▲	1.3%
US Decennial Census; 1790-1960 1900-1990; 1990-2000 2010-2020

=== Racial and ethnic composition ===
Churchill County, Nevada – Racial and ethnic composition Note: the US Census treats Hispanic/Latino as an ethnic category. This table excludes Latinos from the racial categories and assigns them to a separate category. Hispanics/Latinos may be of any race.
Race / Ethnicity (NH = Non-Hispanic)	Pop 1980	Pop 1990	Pop 2000	Pop 2010	Pop 2020	% 1980	% 1990	% 2000	% 2010	% 2020
White alone (NH)	12,276	15,430	19,156	19,030	17,870	88.21%	86.02%	79.88%	76.50%	70.03%
Black or African American alone (NH)	87	200	375	366	428	0.63%	1.11%	1.56%	1.47%	1.68%
Native American or Alaska Native alone (NH)	666	843	1,068	991	1,006	4.79%	4.70%	4.45%	3.98%	3.94%
Asian alone (NH)	282	450	621	633	640	2.03%	2.51%	2.59%	2.54%	2.51%
Native Hawaiian or Pacific Islander alone (NH)	x	x	51	41	87	x	x	0.21%	0.16%	0.34%
Other race alone (NH)	0	7	27	25	143	0.00%	0.04%	0.11%	0.10%	0.56%
Mixed race or Multiracial (NH)	x	x	608	782	1,756	x	x	2.54%	3.14%	6.88%
Hispanic or Latino (any race)	606	1,008	2,076	3,009	3,586	4.35%	5.62%	8.66%	12.10%	14.05%
Total	13,917	17,938	23,982	24,877	25,516	100.00%	100.00%	100.00%	100.00%	100.00%

=== 2020 census ===
As of the 2020 census, the county had a population of 25,516. The median age was 40.7 years. 22.5% of residents were under the age of 18 and 20.5% of residents were 65 years of age or older. For every 100 females there were 100.3 males, and for every 100 females age 18 and over there were 99.8 males age 18 and over. 65.7% of residents lived in urban areas, while 34.3% lived in rural areas.

The racial makeup of the county was 73.4% White, 1.8% Black or African American, 4.6% American Indian and Alaska Native, 2.7% Asian, 0.4% Native Hawaiian and Pacific Islander, 5.9% from some other race, and 11.3% from two or more races. Hispanic or Latino residents of any race comprised 14.1% of the population.

There were 10,017 households in the county, of which 29.7% had children under the age of 18 living with them and 23.5% had a female householder with no spouse or partner present. About 27.5% of all households were made up of individuals and 13.1% had someone living alone who was 65 years of age or older.

There were 10,772 housing units, of which 7.0% were vacant. Among occupied housing units, 67.1% were owner-occupied and 32.9% were renter-occupied. The homeowner vacancy rate was 1.8% and the rental vacancy rate was 4.5%.

=== 2010 census ===
As of the 2010 United States census, the county had 24,877 people, 9,671 households, and 6,631 families. The population density was 5.0 inhabitants per square mile (1.9/km^{2}). There were 10,826 housing units at an average density of 2.2 per square mile (0.85/km^{2}).

The county's racial makeup was 82.0% white, 4.5% American Indian, 2.7% Asian, 1.6% black or African American, 0.2% Pacific islander, 4.8% from other races, and 4.2% from two or more races. Those of Hispanic or Latino origin made up 12.1% of the population. In terms of ancestry, 19.2% were English, 18.8% were German, 13.6% were Irish, 6.5% were Italian, and 5.9% were American.

Of the 9,671 households, 33.2% had children under the age of 18 living with them, 52.0% were married couples living together, 11.3% had a female householder with no husband present, 31.4% were non-families, and 25.2% of all households were made up of individuals. The average household size was 2.53 and the average family size was 3.01. The median age was 39.0 years.

The county's median household income was $51,597 and the median family income was $63,599. Males had a median income of $45,057 versus $32,550 for females. The county's per capita income was $22,997. About 6.8% of families and 8.8% of the population were below the poverty line, including 7.3% of those under age 18 and 10.4% of those age 65 or over.

=== 2000 census ===
As of the 2000 United States census, the county had 23,982 people, 8,912 households, and 6,461 families. The population density was 5 people per square mile (1.9 people/km^{2}). There were 9,732 housing units at an average density of 2 per square mile (0.77/km^{2}).

The country's racial makeup was 84.2% White, 1.6% Black or African American, 4.8% Native American, 2.7% Asian, 0.2% Pacific Islander, 3.2% from other races, and 3.3% from two or more races. 8.7% of the population were Hispanic or Latino of any race.

There were 8,912 households, of which 37.2% had children under the age of 18 living with them, 57.7% were married couples living together, 10.4% had a female householder with no husband present, and 27.5% were non-families. 22.0% of all households were made up of individuals, and 8.5% had someone living alone who was 65 years of age or older. The average household size was 2.64 and the average family size was 3.09.

28.0% of the county's population was under age 18, 8.1% was from age 18 to 24, 28.7% was from age 25 to 44, 22.3% was from age 45 to 64, and 11.9% was age 65 or older. The median age was 35 years. For every 100 females there were 100.6 males. For every 100 females age 18 and over, there were 99.1 males.

The country's median household income was $40,808 and the median family income was $46,624. Males had a median income of $36,478 versus $25,000 for females. The county's per capita income was $19,264. About 6.2% of families and 8.7% of the population were below the poverty line, including 10.8% of those under age 18 and 7.0% of those age 65 or over.

== Communities ==
=== City ===
- Fallon

=== Census-designated place ===
- Fallon Station

=== Unincorporated communities ===
- Cold Springs
- Dixie Valley
- Eastgate
- Hazen
- Middlegate
- Stillwater

== Education ==
The school district is the Churchill County School District. Its public high school is Churchill County High School.

There is a charter school in Fallon, Oasis Academy.

== Politics ==
Lying on the boundary between the northwest urban areas of Nevada and the conservative Mormon Great Basin, Churchill County has more in common with the latter region, being overwhelmingly Republican. It was one of three Nevada counties Barry Goldwater won in 1964, and since that time only Jimmy Carter in 1976 and Barack Obama in 2008 have passed so much as thirty percent of the county's ballots. The last time Churchill County voted for a Democratic presidential candidate was when it supported Franklin D. Roosevelt against Wendell Willkie in 1940.

United States presidential election results for Churchill County, Nevada
Year	Republican		Democratic		Third party(ies)	
Year	No.	%	No.	%	No.	%
1864	129	45.42%	155	54.58%	0	0.00%
1868	75	50.00%	75	50.00%	0	0.00%
1872	41	43.62%	0	0.00%	53	56.38%
1876	34	42.50%	46	57.50%	0	0.00%
1880	82	45.30%	99	54.70%	0	0.00%
1884	96	52.17%	88	47.83%	0	0.00%
1888	86	49.14%	89	50.86%	0	0.00%
1892	57	29.84%	4	2.09%	130	68.06%
1896	47	23.15%	156	76.85%	0	0.00%
1900	79	39.90%	119	60.10%	0	0.00%
1904	185	49.47%	165	44.12%	24	6.42%
1908	389	46.36%	382	45.53%	68	8.10%
1912	157	15.38%	349	34.18%	515	50.44%
1916	531	34.19%	831	53.51%	191	12.30%
1920	873	54.02%	506	31.31%	237	14.67%
1924	655	41.64%	310	19.71%	608	38.65%
1928	1,126	59.99%	751	40.01%	0	0.00%
1932	674	30.75%	1,518	69.25%	0	0.00%
1936	759	37.04%	1,290	62.96%	0	0.00%
1940	1,171	48.03%	1,267	51.97%	0	0.00%
1944	1,130	51.93%	1,046	48.07%	0	0.00%
1948	1,206	50.84%	1,055	44.48%	111	4.68%
1952	1,948	68.33%	903	31.67%	0	0.00%
1956	2,013	65.31%	1,069	34.69%	0	0.00%
1960	1,765	57.42%	1,309	42.58%	0	0.00%
1964	1,607	50.66%	1,565	49.34%	0	0.00%
1968	1,954	52.25%	1,211	32.38%	575	15.37%
1972	2,970	74.10%	1,038	25.90%	0	0.00%
1976	2,358	53.04%	1,800	40.49%	288	6.48%
1980	3,841	72.84%	1,055	20.01%	377	7.15%
1984	4,479	75.53%	1,304	21.99%	147	2.48%
1988	4,578	72.86%	1,481	23.57%	224	3.57%
1992	3,789	49.45%	1,770	23.10%	2,104	27.46%
1996	4,369	56.28%	2,282	29.40%	1,112	14.32%
2000	6,237	70.69%	2,191	24.83%	395	4.48%
2004	7,335	71.65%	2,705	26.42%	197	1.92%
2008	6,832	64.42%	3,494	32.95%	279	2.63%
2012	7,061	68.79%	2,961	28.85%	243	2.37%
2016	7,830	71.59%	2,210	20.20%	898	8.21%
2020	9,372	72.71%	3,051	23.67%	467	3.62%
2024	9,962	73.78%	3,179	23.54%	362	2.68%

United States Senate election results for Churchill County, Nevada1
Year	Republican		Democratic		Third party(ies)	
Year	No.	%	No.	%	No.	%
2024	9,179	68.47%	3,278	24.45%	949	7.08%

== See also ==
- National Register of Historic Places listings in Churchill County, Nevada
- USS Churchill County (LST-583)

== Notable people ==
- Luella Kirkbride Drumm, the only woman to serve in the Nevada State Legislature in 1939.
- Mary Daisy White, one of the first women elected to the Nevada Assembly.
