= Humboldt Wildlife Management Area =

Protected area in Nevada, United States

Humboldt Wildlife Management
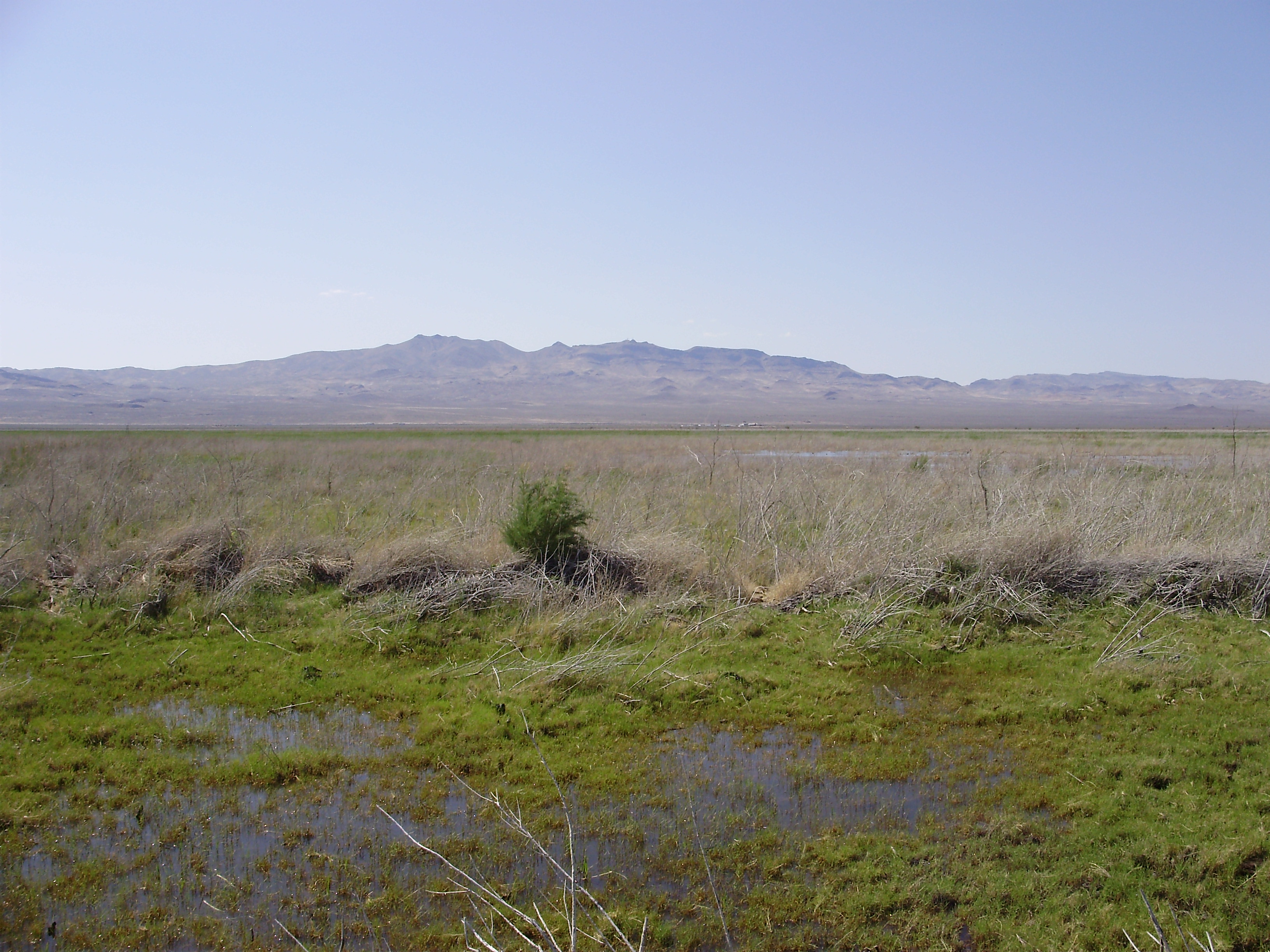
- The salt marsh at the end of the Humboldt River within Humboldt WMA.

- Location within Nevada
- Location: Pershing, Churchill, Nevada, United States
- Coordinates: 39.98°N 118.62°W
- Area: 37,140 acres (150.3 km^{2})
- Established: 1953
- Governing body: Nevada Department of Wildlife
- Website: [ Humboldt Wildlife Management Area]

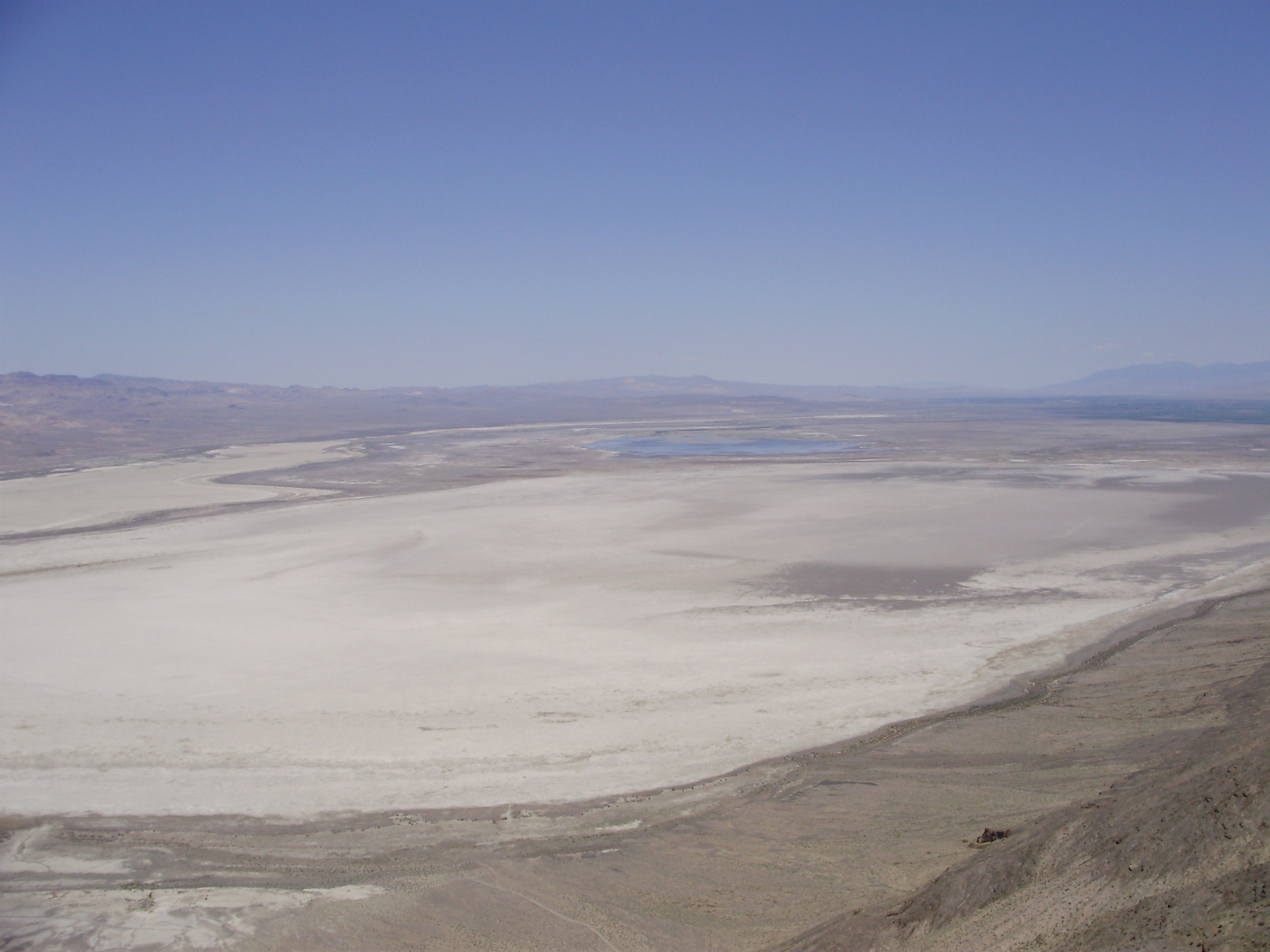
The Humboldt Sink as seen from the West Humboldt Range.

The Humboldt Wildlife Management Area (WMA) is a wildlife management area in the U.S. state of Nevada, encompassing the salt marshes at the terminus of the Humboldt River.

== Habitats and wildlife ==
The Humboldt WMA contains habitats ranging from alkali desert scrub to open water, in three shallow intermittent lakes: Upper Humboldt Lake, Lower Humboldt Lake, and Toulon Lake. Due to high climatic variation from month to month and from year to year in the Great Basin, the amount of water that reaches the Humboldt Sink can vary enormously, from up to 25,000 acres (39 sq mi) during years of high flow (such as in 1998) to the entire area going dry. Water flows into the Humboldt WMA depend in part upon the amount of irrigation water used by farms immediately upstream in the Lovelock Valley.

Although resident populations of fish and other wildlife rise and fall according to the level of flow into the Humboldt WMA, the wetlands provide a valuable stopover for migratory and breeding bird populations. Ducks, such as mallards, Canada geese, and American coots are common, as are shorebirds such as the American avocet and raptors such as owls and hawks. Some mule deer live among the stands of invasive tamarix. The WMA is mostly used recreationally for hunting, as well as fishing during the occasional periods of high water flow. Camping is also permitted. The WMA is open year-round at all hours, with no charge for entry.

== History ==
The area of the Humboldt WMA has a history of human habitation dating back several thousand years. Just outside the WMA's boundaries is Lovelock Cave, an important archaeological site in which Native American artifacts have been found, including the world's oldest known duck decoys, which have been dated at over 2000 years old. During the mid-1800s, emigrants following the California Trail came to this area, known as Big Meadows, for their last chance to collect water and graze their animals before crossing the dreaded Forty Mile Desert. The WMA was created in 1953 and gradually grew to its current size of 37,140 acres (58 sq mi) through a series of leases, purchases, land trades, and donations.

== Environmental issues ==
The Humboldt WMA, since it is located at the end of the Humboldt River which has the largest drainage basin in Nevada, absorbs anthropogenic pollutants from areas upstream. Through the process of bioaccumulation, pollution from sewage, irrigation drainage, dewatering from mines, etc. can reach high enough concentrations to harm fish and wildlife, as well as humans who consume them. A study published in the 1990s found that concentrations of arsenic, boron, mercury, and selenium exceeded levels associated with harm to avian species.

== See also ==
- Humboldt Sink
- Humboldt Salt Marsh
- Humboldt Lake
- List of Nevada Wildlife Management Areas
