= Soda Lakes =

Pair of alkaline lakes in Churchill County, Nevada, US

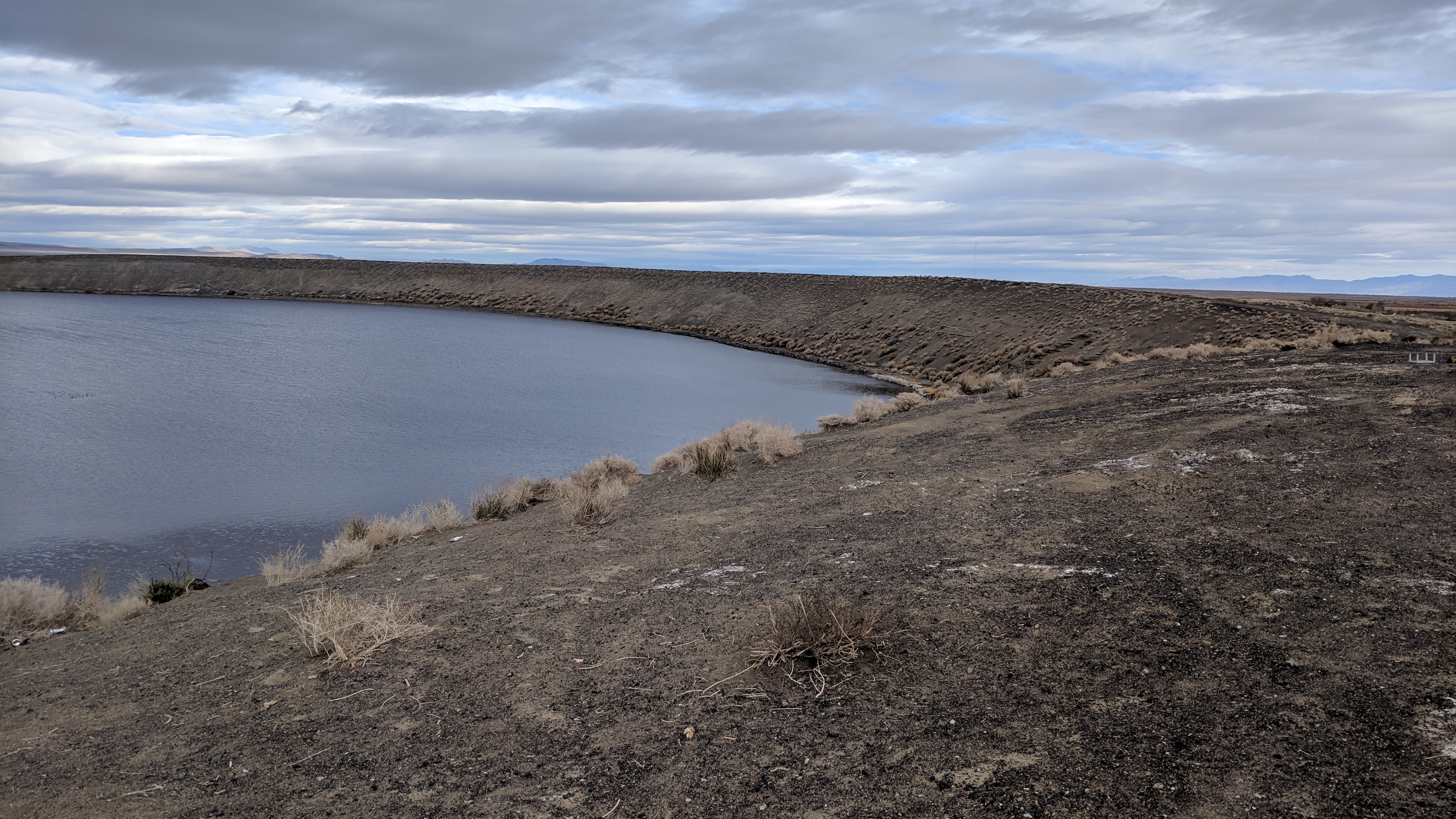
- east rim of Big Soda Lake

- Location in Nevada
- Location: Churchill County, Nevada, US
- Coordinates: 39°31′48″N 118°52′12″W
- Type: meromictic, volcanic crater lake
- Primary inflows: aquifer
- Primary outflows: evaporation
- Max. depth: 207 ft (63 m)
- Surface elevation: 4,104 ft (1,251 m)

The Soda Lakes are two lakes located northwest of Fallon, Nevada. They occupy two basaltic maar volcano craters which may have erupted in the last 1,500 years. The larger lake, called Soda Lake or Big Soda Lake, is somewhat elongated, stretching 2 kilometers (1.2 mi) in length. The smaller one, Little Soda Lake, is 200 meters (660 ft) across. Considered to be a single volcano, the combined craters are young enough that future activity cannot be ruled out. A geothermal power plant is located on the northeast flank of the volcano.

A significant increase in level of Big Soda Lake occurred in the early 20th century due to increased groundwater table. It became a meromictic lake where the deeper water no longer mixes with surface waters. New tufa formations have served as a rare research example of tufa's rate of growth within a century.

== Geology ==
eruption of Soda Lakes volcano
- Date: less than 6000 years ago
- Type: Maar

Maar volcanoes such as at Soda Lakes are formed by explosive eruptions when magma comes into contact with groundwater.

The Lahontan Valley floor around Soda Lakes consists of ancient Lake Lahontan sediments. The Soda Lakes volcano's age is inferred as less than 6,000 years because it is younger than the lake sediments. Fault lines in the Carson Valley trend to the northeast. Other older volcanoes nearby include the Upsal Hogback basalt cone 7 miles northeast and Rattlesnake Hill in Fallon.

=== Volcano monitoring ===
Soda Lakes is the only volcano in Nevada currently listed on the USGS Volcano Hazards Program. It was added in 2018 with an initial assessment as a moderate threat potential. Since the volcano's age was inferred to be younger than local Lake Lahontan sediments, that qualified as eruptive activity within the Holocene for inclusion on the list. It is monitored by the USGS California Volcano Observatory, which includes Nevada in its region.

=== Geothermal plant ===
Exploration of the geothermal field in the Carson Desert near Soda Lakes began in the 1970s. The Soda Lake I & II geothermal energy plants came online in 1987 and 1991 respectively, with continuing development by multiple owners.

== 19th-century exploration ==
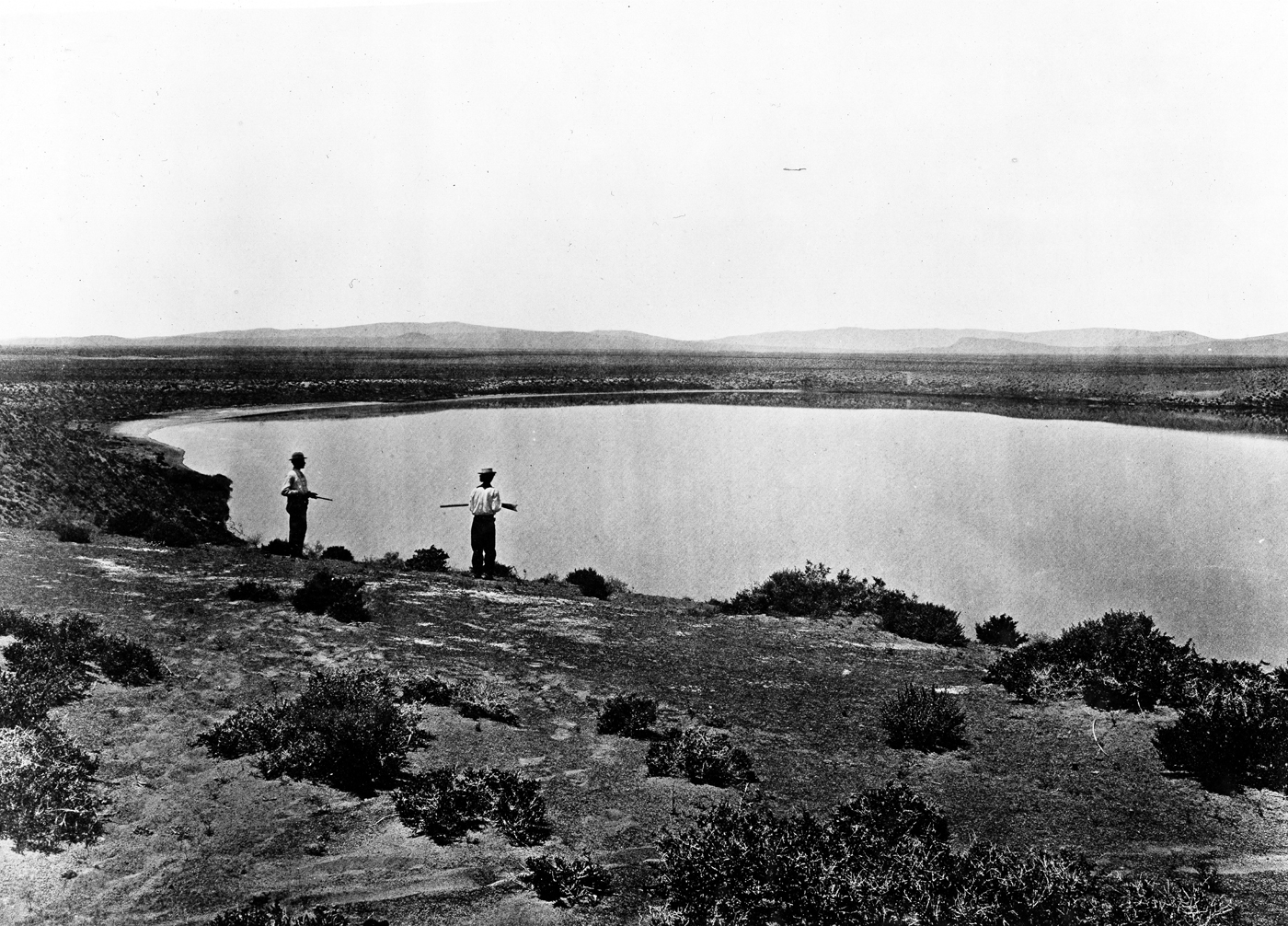
West half of Soda Lake T.H. O'Sullivan in the late 1800s

A spring at Big Soda Lake provided the first drinkable water for 1800s wagon travelers on the Carson Trail at the end of the Forty Mile Desert, 2 miles before reaching the Carson River.

The lakes are classified as soda lakes, hence the name. In 1875, two commercial facilities were built for extraction of soda from the lake, for use by the Nevada mining industry.

According to an early study of Soda Lakes, Russell (1885) describes the Soda Lake basin at the time as follows:

The rim of the larger lake in its highest part rises 80 feet above the surrounding desert, and is 165 feet higher than the surface of the lake which it incloses. The outer slope of the cone is gentle and merges almost imperceptibly with the desert surface; but the inner slope is abrupt and at times approaches the perpendicular. A series of careful soundings gives 147 feet as the greatest depth of the lake. The total depth of the depression is therefore 312 feet, and its bottom is 232 feet lower than the general surface of the desert near at hand.

== Early 20th-century lake level increase ==
Following the construction of Lahontan Dam on the Carson River in 1911–1916, the groundwater table rose in the Lahontan Valley downstream of the reservoir. Additional water for irrigation was brought to Lahontan Reservoir from the Truckee River via a canal from Derby Dam. Rising groundwater increased the depth of Big Soda Lake by 60 feet (18 m) from 147 feet (45 m) to 207 feet (63 m), bringing the commercial soda operations to an abrupt end by submerging the machinery. The facility was eventually under a depth of 35 feet (11 m) of water when the lake level stabilized in 1930.

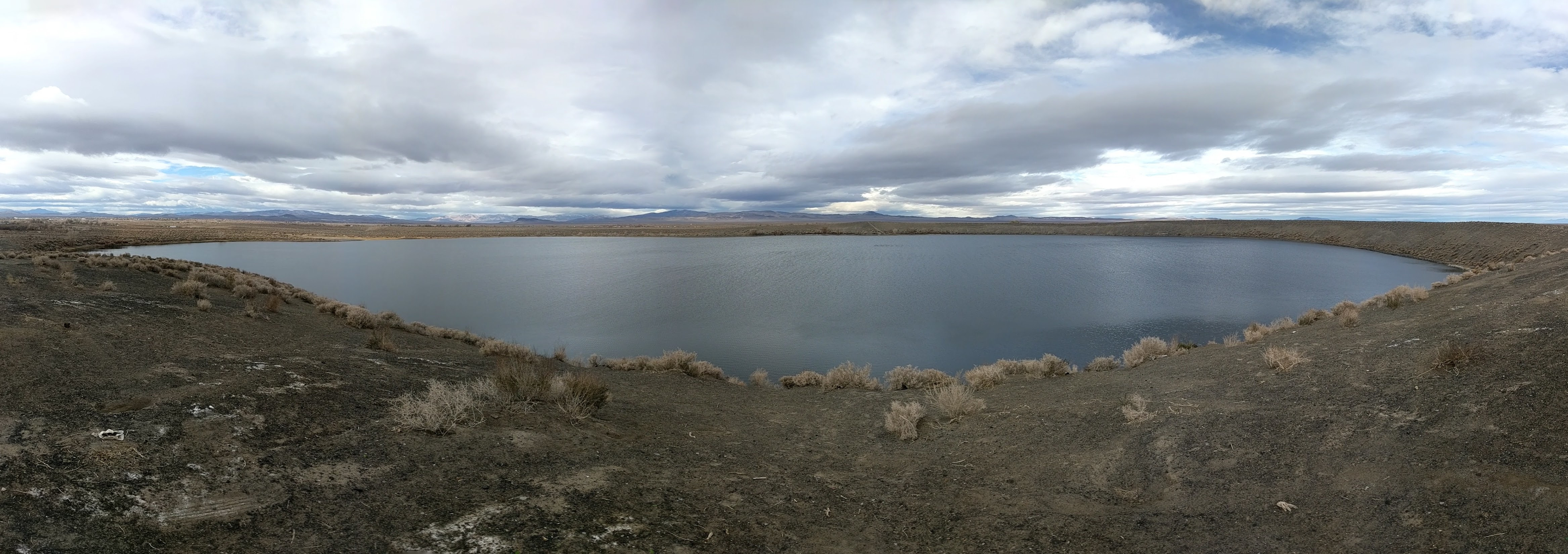
Panorama of Big Soda Lake in 2018

=== Meromictic lake ===
Due to the rise in water level, Big Soda Lake became a meromictic lake. The denser lower layer is colder and more saline, and no longer mixes with the surface layer at any time of year. It is anoxic, or completely depleted of oxygen, below the chemocline boundary.

A 1978 paper on "Recent changes in the meromictic status of Big Soda Lake" reported the depth of the chemocline was first detected in 1933 as at 18 meters (59 ft). It had fallen to 37.5 meters (123 ft) at the time of the paper, leading to speculation that the lake would fully mix and cease to be meromictic within a few decades. The chemocline was listed as at 35 meters (115 ft) depth in 1983 and 2015 papers, showing it had not continued to fall but remained stable around the level measured in the 1970s.

=== Tufa formations ===
The lake level increase also started tufa formations to grow from interaction of incoming springs with lake minerals and bacteria. In less than a century the tufa became over 3 meters (9.8 ft) high. Due to fluctuations in the lake level, sometimes the tops of the tufa are out of the water. These tufa formations became subject of research interest because lake level increase constrains their age to a century, which is a geologically short period of time. Compared to other usually-slower geological processes, the rate of growth of the tufa surprised observers.

== Roads ==
Nevada State Route 723 is a 2 mile long state highway on part of Soda Lake Road since 1978. Its southern terminus is at US Route 50, which passes about 1.5 miles (2.4 km) south of Little Soda Lake.

== See also ==
- LORAN-C transmitter Fallon now closed, is located near Soda Lakes off State Route 723
- Ragtown is a historical emigrant trail stop and ghost town near Soda Lakes
