= Fallon National Wildlife Refuge =

Protected area in Nevada, United States

- IUCN category IV (habitat/species management area)
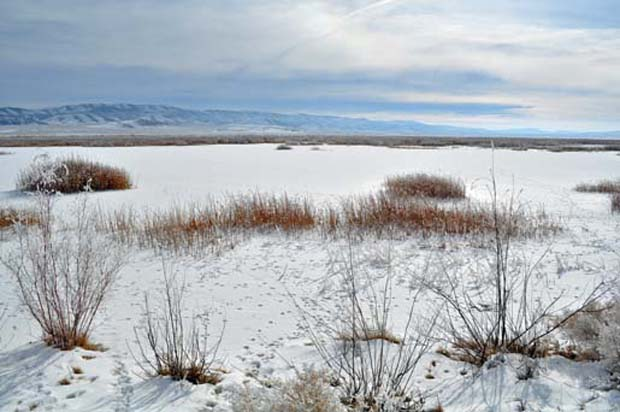

- Location within Nevada
- Location: Churchill County, Nevada, United States
- Nearest city: Fallon, Nevada
- Coordinates: 39.75241°N 118.61653°W
- Area: 15,000 acres (61 km^{2})
- Established: 1931
- Governing body: U.S. Fish and Wildlife Service
- Website: Fallon National Wildlife Refuge

Fallon National Wildlife Refuge is a National Wildlife Refuge of the United States located in western Nevada. It was established in 1931 as a refuge and breeding ground for birds and other wild animals.

The refuge comprises over 15,000 acres (6,100 ha) of playa and wetland habitat in the Carson Sink. This area, in the Lahontan Valley, is at the terminus of the Carson River. In years of high water flows down the river, the refuge is important for migratory shorebirds and waterfowl. However, due to diversions, in most years there is not enough flow for the river to even reach the refuge lands.

The refuge is open 7 days a week, 24 hours a day, but there are no facilities on the refuge. Roads are primitive and passable only during those periods of dry weather.
