= Hot Springs Mountains =

Hill range in Nevada, United States

Coordinates: 39°50′00″N 118°50′00″W

The Hot Springs Mountains are a range of rocky hills located in Northern Nevada, in Churchill County, between the cities of Fallon, Lovelock, and Fernley. The area was recently volcanically active (in geological terms), is underlain by hot rocks, and is the site of several geothermal electric power plants. It is an arid, rough terrain, uninhabited. These mountains are adjacent to the Lahontan Valley, which contains the Forty Mile Desert, a daunting section of the 19th century California emigrant trail. During the Pleistocene epoch this range of mountains was an island in the now extinct Lake Lahontan.
