= Rattlesnake Hill =

Rattlesnake Hill may refer to:

- Rattlesnake Hill (Churchill County, Nevada)
- Rattlesnake Hill, California

== See also ==
- Rattlesnake Hills, Washington state
- Rattlesnake Hills greenstone belt, Wyoming
