= West Humboldt Range =

Mountain range in Nevada, United States

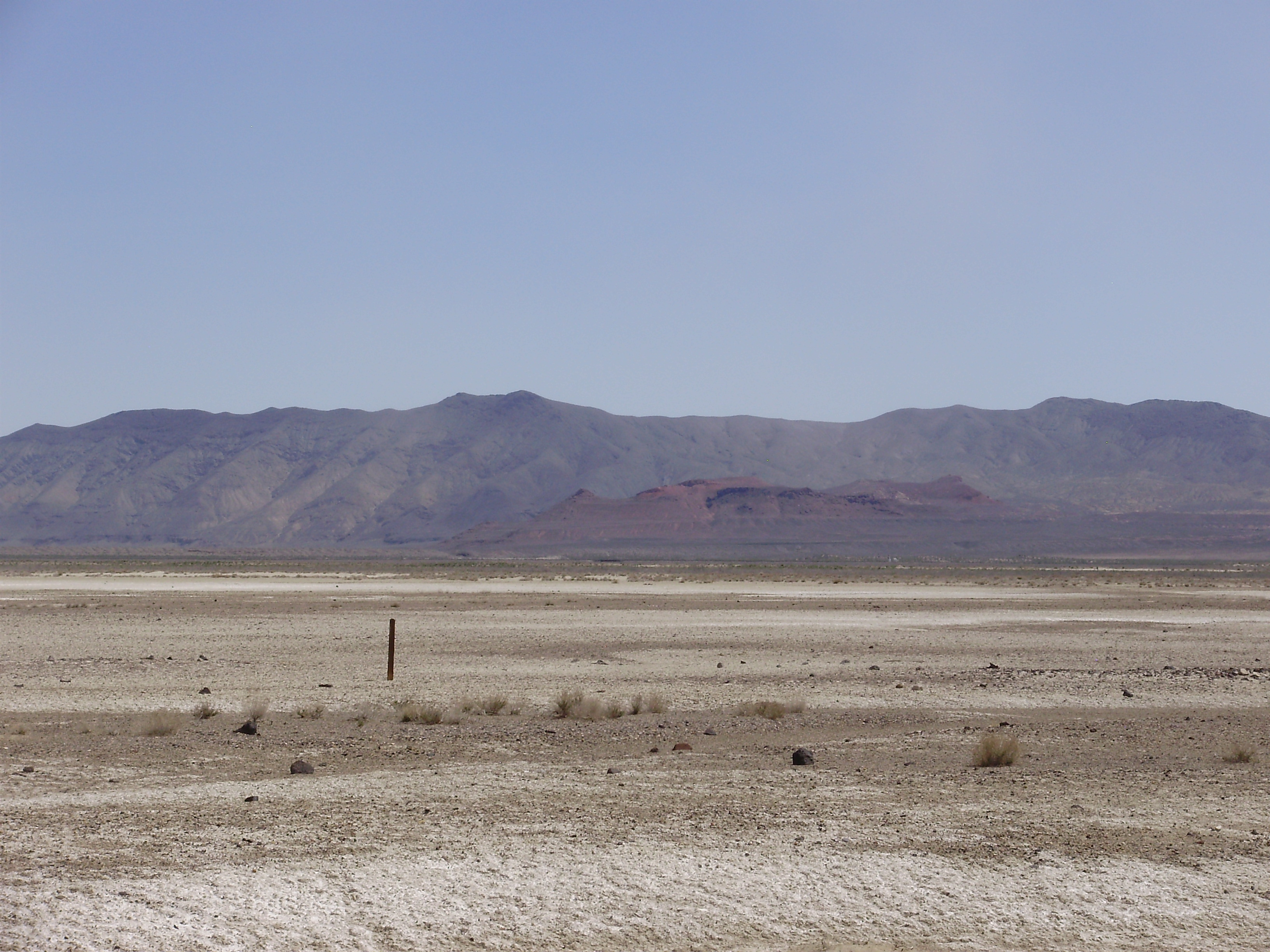
- View of Topog Peak and the westernmost part of the West Humboldt Range from U.S. Route 95 near the junction with Interstate 80

Highest point
- Elevation: 1,876 m (6,155 ft)

Geography
- Location within Nevada
- Country: United States
- State: Nevada
- District(s): Pershing County and Churchill County
- City: Lovelock, NV
- Range coordinates: 40°3′21.680″N 118°21′54.516″W
- Borders on: Humboldt Sink, Humboldt Lake, Carson Sink, Carson Desert, Humboldt River-(west range border)
- Topo map: USGS Wildhorse Spring

The West Humboldt Range is a short mountain range in the western Great Basin in northwestern Nevada in the United States.

== Geography ==
The mountain range runs for approximately 40 mi (64 km) southwest to northeast in northern Churchill County and southern Pershing County. The southwest end of the range is approximately 60 mi (97 km) ENE of Reno.

The range separates the lower course and terminus-(Humboldt Lake) of the Humboldt River and the Humboldt Sink on the northwest side from the expansive Carson Sink on the south and southeast side. Interstate 80 follows the course of the Humboldt along the northwest side of the range. During the last ice age, the range stood along the shore of Lake Lahontan, the prehistoric shorelines and beaches of which are visible along the sides of the range.

Few peaks in the range are named; one of the few with an official name is Topog Peak in northern Churchill County, near the southwestern end of the range.

== History ==
In 1905 the Saurian Expedition, led by John C. Merriam and financed by Annie Alexander, explored the Triassic limestones of the range, discovering 25 specimens of Ichthyosaur.

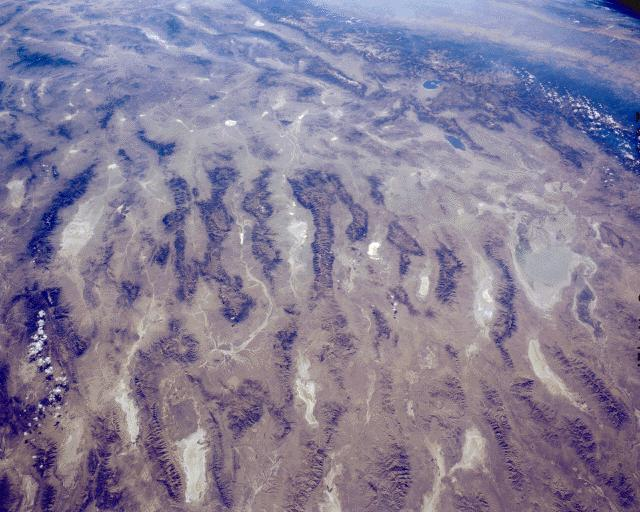
Satellite photo, view south; Carson sink at right (small, black curved range on its northwest is the W. Humboldt Range)-(Pahrump Valley, top-left; Death Valley-top; Sierra Nevada, top-right)

== See also ==
- Mountain ranges of Nevada
- Great Basin
- Basin and Range Province
