= Carson Sink =

Dry lake in Churchill County, Nevada, USA

- Playa
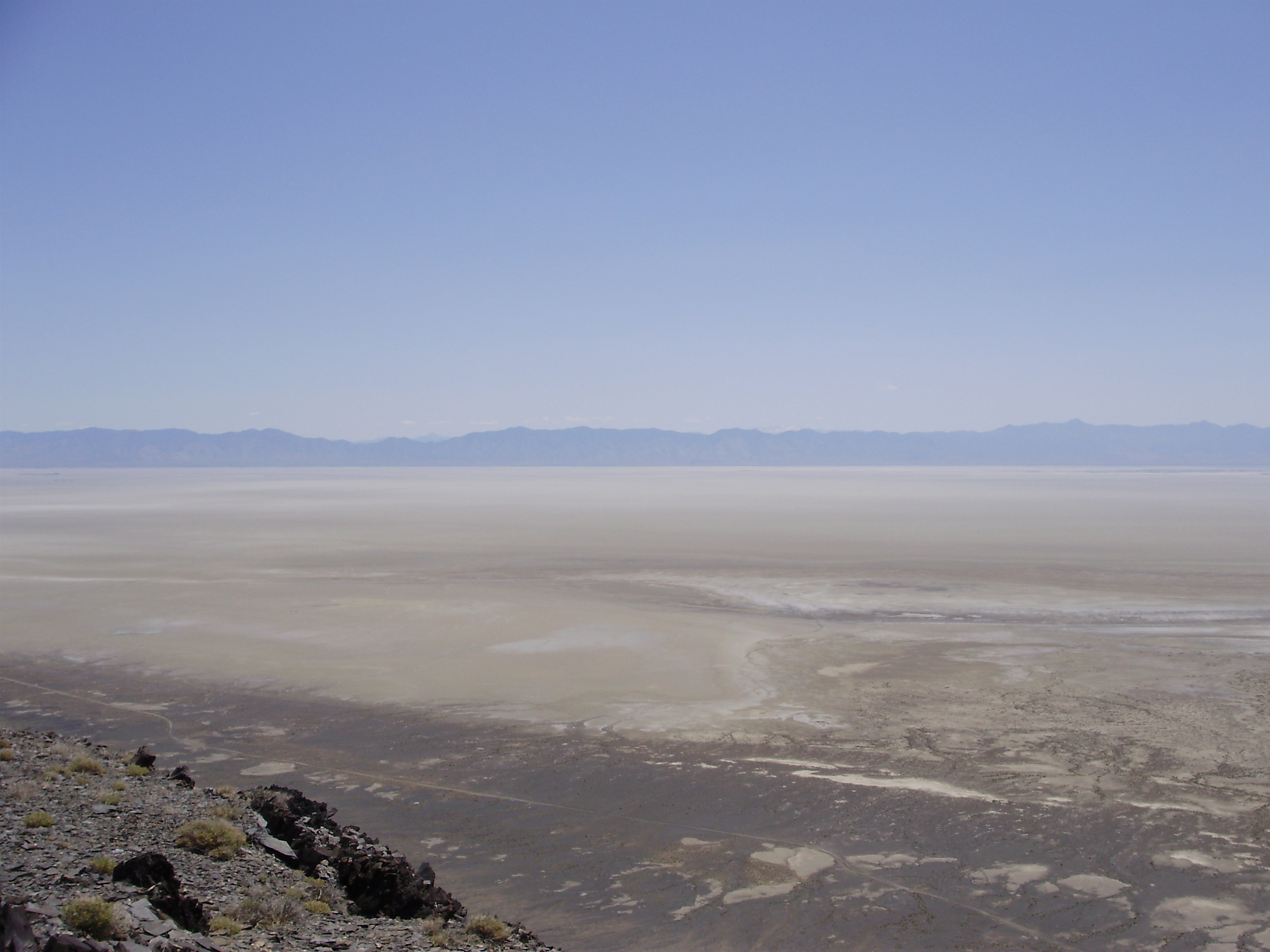
- View southeast across the Carson Sink from Topog Peak in the West Humboldt Range

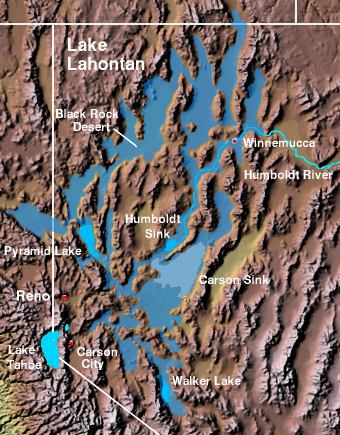
- The Carson Sink and the Lahontan Valley form the central portion of the lake bed of the prehistoric Lake Lahontan.
- Coordinates: 39°52′40″N 118°20′50″W
- Location: Lahontan Basin, Nevada

Area
  - Total: 300 sq mi (780 km^{2})

Carson Sink is a playa in the northeastern portion of the Carson Desert in present-day Nevada, United States of America, that was formerly the terminus of the Carson River. Today the sink is fed by drainage canals of the Truckee-Carson Irrigation District. The southeastern fringe of the sink, where the canals enter, is a wetland of the Central Basin and Range ecoregion.

This is mostly included within the Fallon National Wildlife Refuge and the Stillwater Wildlife Management Area. This area serves as an important stopover for migrating waterfowl. The Sehoo Formation is south of the Carson Sink.

== Carson Sink and Lone Rock working areas ==
The Carson Sink and Lone Rock working areas are the northwest portion of both the Carson Sink and the US Naval Fallon Range Training Complex. The Lone Rock working area includes the Bravo-20 range, which has numerous targets for combat aircraft training.

Lone Rock is in the middle of a Bravo-20 live bombing area. It is a solitary pinnacle of rock through the playa and it is held sacred by the Northern Paiute.

== History ==
The Carson Sink was a deep portion of the Pleistocene water body Lake Lahontan, the lakebed of which is now the Lahontan Basin.

The Carson Trail, used during the California Gold Rush across the Lahontan Basin, included a section through the Forty Mile Desert to the first drinkable water on the Carson River. The Carson Sink station of the Pony Express was built in March 1860.

In June 1952, two U.S. Air Force colonels flew a B-25 bomber from Hamilton Field near San Francisco to Colorado Springs, Colorado. While passing over Carson Sink, the two reportedly saw three unknown aircraft fly within 800 yards (731.5 m) of their aircraft before speeding out of sight seconds later. Upon landing, the two colonels reported the incident to the Air Defense Command headquarters, who informed them that there were no military or civilian aircraft in the area at the time. The incident was never resolved and is known today as the Carson Sink UFO incident.

In 1984, the natural dike between the Carson Sink and the Humboldt Sink was breached by the Nevada Department of Transportation to prevent Interstate 80 and the town of Lovelock from flooding due to unusually heavy snowfall in the preceding three years. The sinks remained connected by water for three years, until 1987.

== Panorama ==
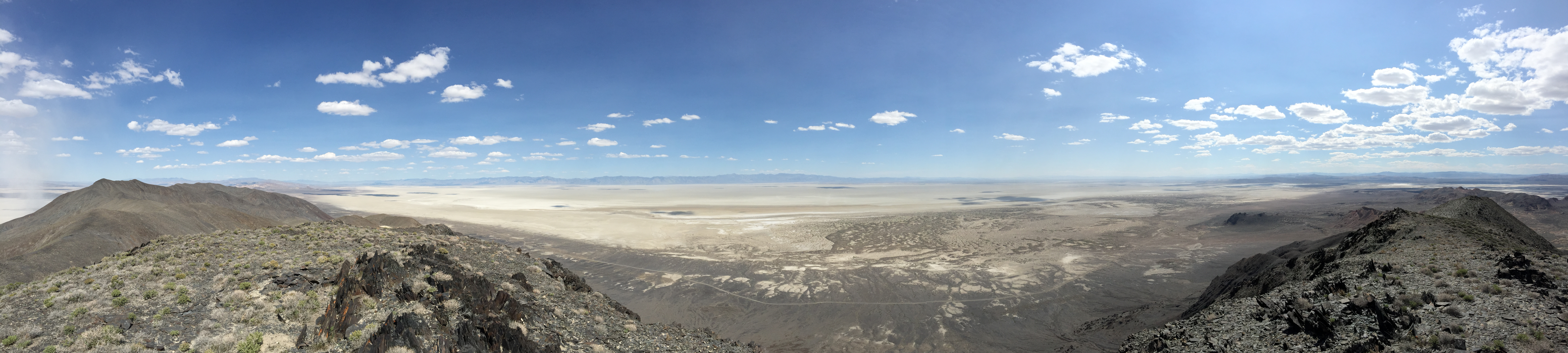
Panorama of the Carson Sink

== See also ==
- West Humboldt Range
