= Humboldt Mountains =

The Humboldt Mountains may refer to one of several mountain ranges:

- Humboldt Mountains (Antarctica), in Queen Maud Land
- Humboldt Mountains (New Zealand), in Otago, South Island
- Humboldt Range, in Nevada, United States
  - East Humboldt Range, Nevada
  - West Humboldt Range, Nevada
