= Nevada State Route 723 =

State highway in Nevada, United States

State Route 723
- Soda Lake Road
- SR 723 highlighted in red

Route information
- Maintained by NDOT
- Length: 2.008 mi (3.232 km)
- Existed: 1978–present

Major junctions
- South end: US 50 west of Fallon
- North end: Cox Road northwest of Fallon

Location
- Country: United States
- State: Nevada
- Counties: Churchill

Highway system
- Nevada State Highway System; Interstate; US; State; Pre‑1976; Scenic
← SR 722	→ SR 726

State Route 723 (SR 723) is a 2-mile (3.2 km) state highway in Churchill County, Nevada, running through a rural area northwest of Fallon.

== Route description ==
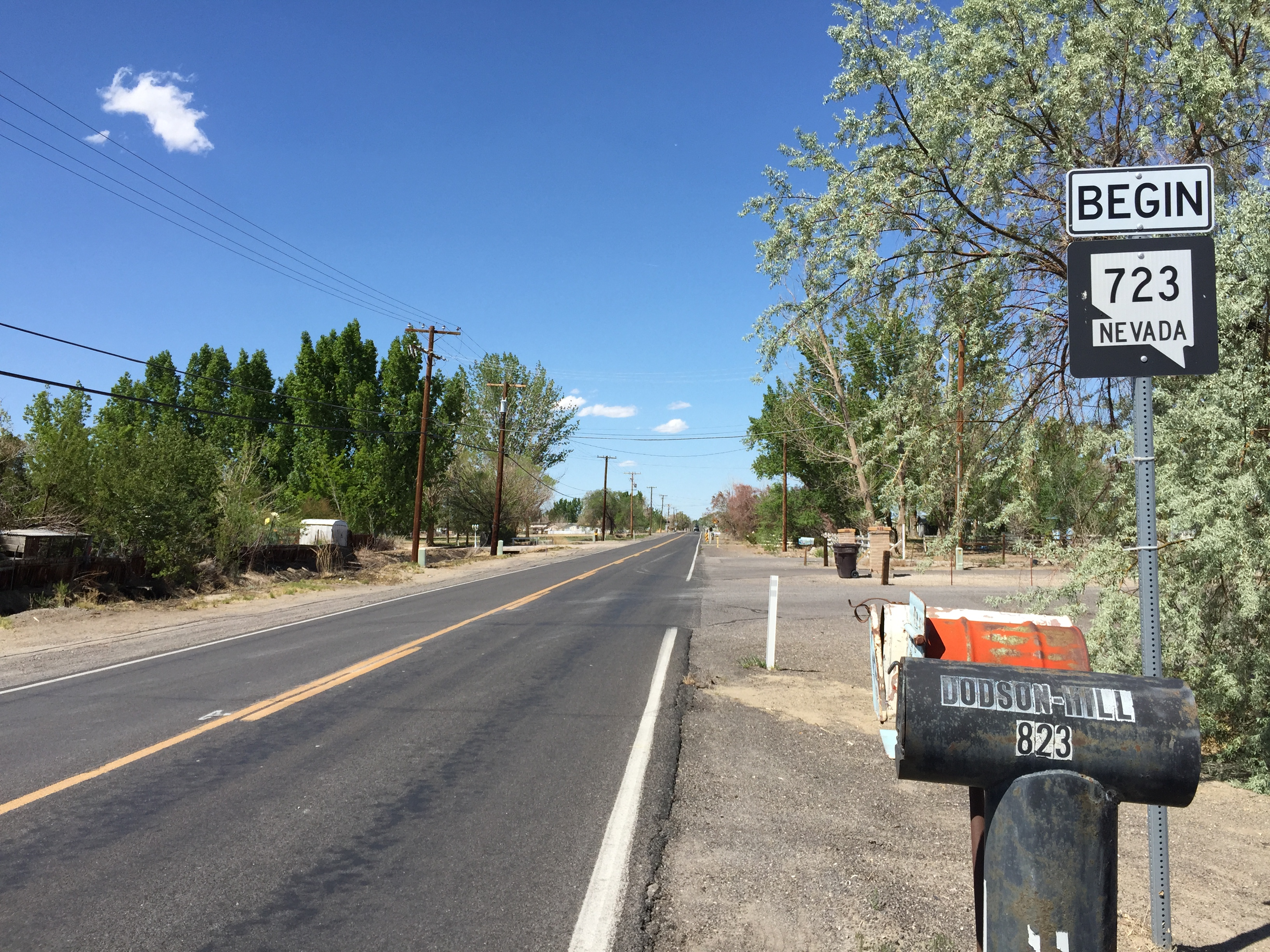
View at the south end of SR 723 looking northbound

SR 723 begins at a junction with U.S. Route 50 (US 50) approximately 4 miles (6.4 km) west of downtown Fallon. From there, the highway runs northward along Soda Lake Road, a two-lane road through mostly residential and rural agricultural areas. The highway follows Soda Lake Road due north for about 2 miles (3.2 km) before reaching its terminus at an intersection with Cox Road, on the southeastern flank of the Soda Lakes volcano.

Near the northern end of SR723 are the Soda Lakes, Soda Lake Geothermal Plant, now-closed Coast Guard LORAN-C transmitter Fallon and some farms around the periphery of Soda Lakes.

== History ==
The alignment of present-day SR 723 appears on maps as early as 1937. However, it was not designated as a state highway until January 1, 1978.

== Major intersections ==
The entire route is in Churchill County.

Location	mi	km	Destinations	Notes
	0	0.0	US 50	Southern terminus
			Cox Road	Northern terminus; Soda Lake Road continues beyond terminus
1.000 mi = 1.609 km; 1.000 km = 0.621 mi
