= Lahontan Valley =

Basin in Nevada, United States

- Lahontan Basin
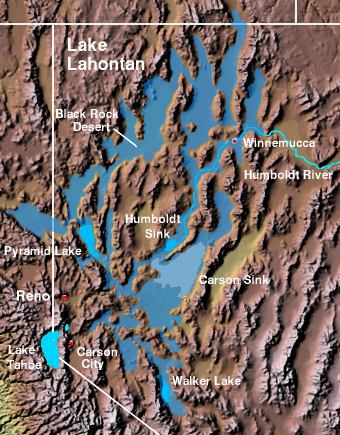
- The Lahontan Valley is adjacent to the Carson Sink and southwest of the Humboldt Sink.

- Location within Nevada Location within the United States
- Floor elevation: 4,006 ft (1,221 m)

Geography
- Country: United States
- State: Nevada
- District: Churchill County
- Coordinates: 39°34′0″N 118°50′0″W
- Traversed by: U.S. Route 50
- Interactive map of Lahontan Valley

The Lahontan Valley is a basin in Churchill County, Nevada, United States. The valley is a landform of the central portion of the prehistoric Lake Lahontan's lakebed of 20,000-9,000 years ago. The valley and the adjacent Carson Sink represent a small portion of the lake bed. Humboldt Lake is to the valley's northeast. Pyramid Lake is west. Walker Lake is to the south. The valley is part of the larger Great Basin Desert, however during the California Gold Rush the valley was often called the Forty Mile Desert.

== Description ==
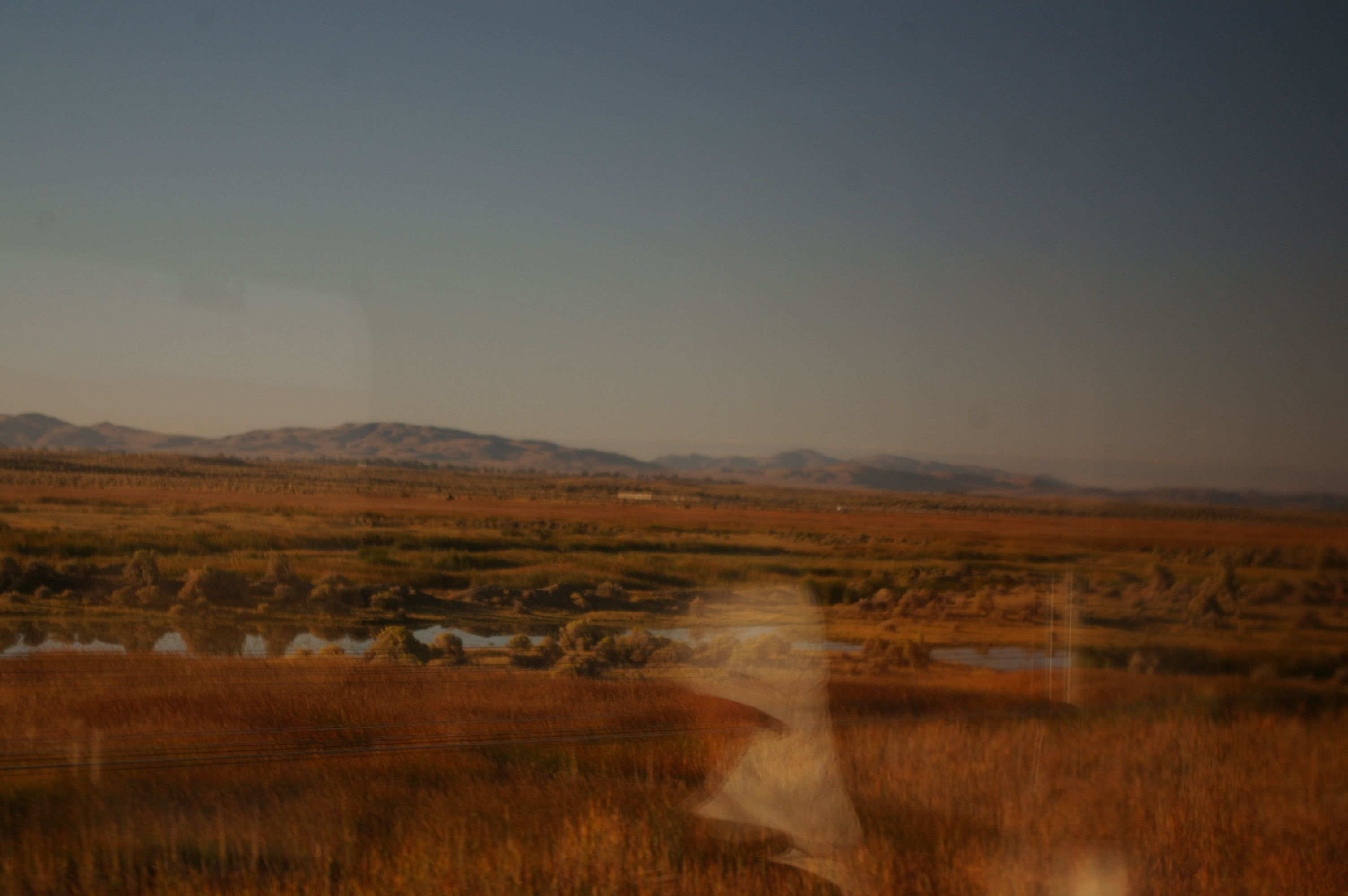
View from the California Zephyr showing the Lahontan Valley and Forty Mile Desert. The trees in the distance reveal the location of the Carson River and the city of Fallon. The Massie Slough provides water to this part of the desert, but is undrinkable due to the alkaline soil.

The Lahontan Valley is mostly uninhabited desert, aside from the city of Fallon and the Fallon Paiute-Shoshone Reservation. There is sparse habitation in farmland around the Carson River and irrigation canals surrounding Fallon, an arc of farms around the Soda Lakes volcano, the railroad junction at Hazen and the ghost town of Stillwater. There is a geothermal power plant at Soda Lake and combined geothermal/solar plant at Stillwater.

The valley derives its name from Louis-Armand de Lom d'Arce de Lahontan, Baron de Lahontan, a French soldier.

== Forty Mile Desert ==
The Forty Mile Desert is a California Gold Rush name for Nevada's Lahontan Valley and the adjoining area to the northwest. Emigrants following the California Trail west came into the Lahontan Valley via the Humboldt River. West of the river's end in the Humboldt Sink, the trail forked, with one branch leading towards the Carson River and the other towards the Truckee River. Regardless of which route they took, the travelers would have to endure about 40 miles (64 km) of desert without usable water. The Truckee route traversed the area starting at modern Lovelock, reaching the waters of the Truckee River near modern Wadsworth. This path is along a series of smaller valleys separated from the main part of the Lahontan Valley by the Hot Springs Mountains. Modern Interstate 80 closely approximates this path. The Carson route across the Lahontan Valley proceeds south from modern Lovelock towards an area west of modern Fallon called Ragtown, which had the last usable water on the Carson River. The First transcontinental railroad (modern Overland Route) and U.S. Route 95 loosely follow the Carson route.

In Chapter XX of Roughing It, Mark Twain speaks of his traversing it during the stagecoach journey his brother and he made from Missouri to Nevada in the summer of 1861:

On the nineteenth day we crossed the Great American Desert—forty memorable miles of bottomless sand, into which the coach wheels sunk from six inches to a foot. We worked our passage most of the way across. That is to say, we got out and walked. It was a dreary pull and a long and thirsty one, for we had no water. From one extremity of this desert to the other, the road was white with the bones of oxen and horses. It would hardly be an exaggeration to say that we could have walked the forty miles and set our feet on a bone at every step! The desert was one prodigious graveyard. And the log-chains, wagon tyres, and rotting wrecks of vehicles were almost as thick as the bones. I think we saw log-chains enough rusting there in the desert, to reach across any State in the Union. Do not these relics suggest something of an idea of the fearful suffering and privation the early emigrants to California endured?

Per a state historical marker at a rest area at the junction of I-80 and US 95, the Forty Mile Desert was the most dreaded part of the California Trail. If possible, the stretch was crossed at night. An 1850 survey counted 953 graves along this portion of the trail, along with thousands of animal skeletons and abandoned belongings of the desperate travelers.
