= Nevada State Route 726 =

State highway in Nevada, United States

State Route 726
- Old River Road; Bafford Lane
- SR 726 highlighted in red

Route information
- Maintained by NDOT
- Length: 1.866 mi (3.003 km)
- Existed: January 1, 1978–present

Major junctions
- West end: US 95 north of Fallon
- East end: 1.866 miles east of US 95

Location
- Country: United States
- State: Nevada
- County: Churchill

Highway system
- Nevada State Highway System; Interstate; US; State; Pre‑1976; Scenic
← SR 723	→ SR 756

State Route 726 (SR 726) is a 1.866-mile-long (3.003 km) state highway in Churchill County, Nevada running through a rural area north of Fallon.

== Route description ==
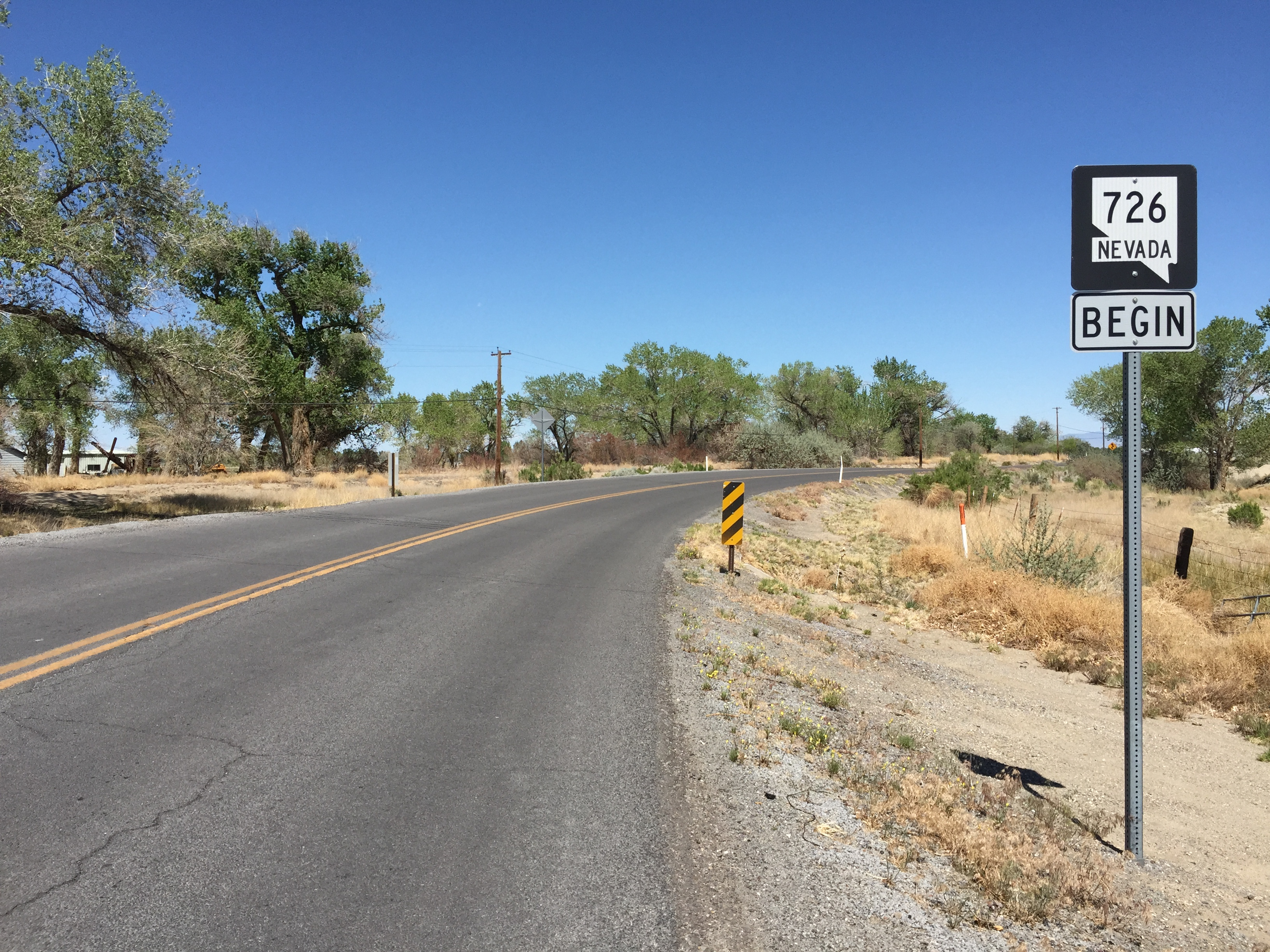
View at the west end of SR 726 looking eastbound as seen in 2015

SR 726 begins at a junction with U.S. Route 95 (US 95) approximately 2 miles (3.2 km) north of downtown Fallon. From there, the highway runs northeastward along Old River Road, a two-lane roadway following the Lower Soda Lake Drain through a rural agricultural area. After about 0.8 miles (1.3 km), SR 726 turns onto Bafford Lane, another two-lane farm road. The highway follows Bafford Lane due east for about 1 mile (1.6 km), ending at a bridge over the Carson River.

== History ==
The alignment of present-day SR 726 can be seen on maps dating as early as 1937. At that time, the Old River Road portion of the highway was a minimally-improved part of State Route 1A, a highway that connected Fallon to US 40 southwest of Lovelock. However, SR 1A was rerouted to a newer alignment by 1957, thus removing the designation from Old River Road. SR 1A would later become US 95.

SR 726 was established as a state highway on January 1, 1978.

== Major intersections ==
The entire route is in Churchill County.

Location	mi	km	Destinations	Notes
	0	0.0	US 95	Western terminus
			Bafford Lane	Continuation beyond eastern terminus
1.000 mi = 1.609 km; 1.000 km = 0.621 mi
