= Carson Desert =

Desert in Nevada, U.S.

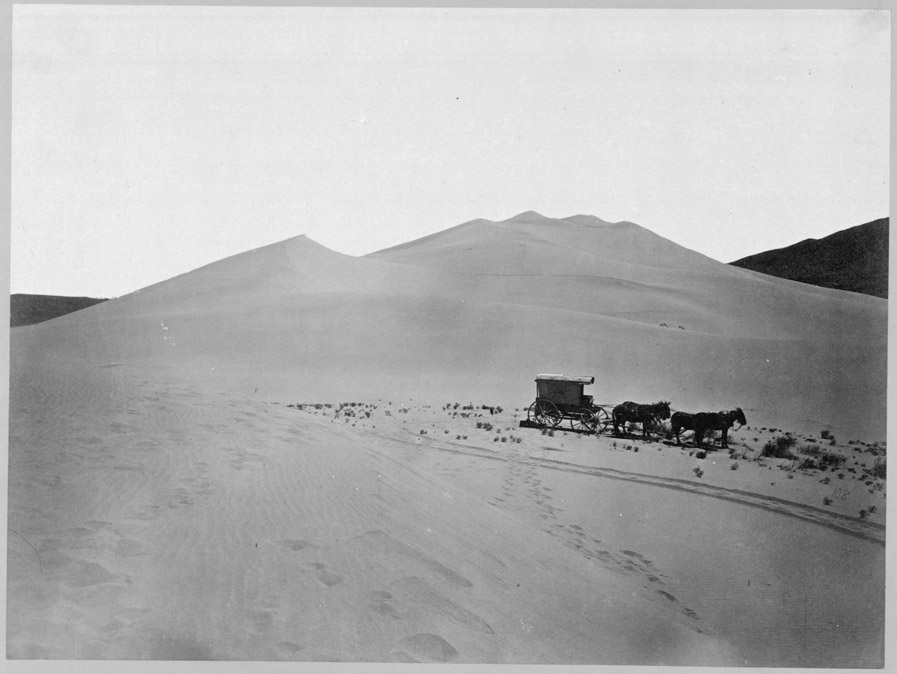
- Timothy H. O'Sullivan's portable studio in the Carson Desert in 1867.
- Area: 2,150 mi^{2} (5,600 km^{2})

Geography
- Country: United States
- State: Nevada
- Region: central Lahontan subregion of the Great Basin
- Borders on: N: Humboldt Basin; E: Central Nevada Desert Basins; S: Walker River Basin; W: Middle Carson Watershed; NW: northern Lahontan subregion
- Coordinates: 39.980°N 118.841°W
- Interactive map of Carson Desert

The Carson Desert is a desert in the Lahontan Basin and the desert valley of Churchill County, Nevada (U.S.), which receives an average 5 inches (130 mm) annual precipitation. The desert is the low valley area (including the Carson Sink in the north of the valley) between the adjacent mountain ranges, while the larger watershed includes the interior slopes of the demarcating ranges. The desert was inundated by Lake Lahontan during the Pleistocene, and the watershed became part of Nevada's Conservation Security Program in 2005.
