= LORAN-C transmitter Fallon =

Former LORAN-C Chain Master station

Coordinates: 39°33′7″N 118°49′55″W

LORAN-C transmitter Fallon was the Master station of the U.S. West Coast LORAN-C Chain (GRI 9940). It used a transmission power of 400 kW.

The Fallon LORAN-C transmitter was situated near Fallon, Nevada near Nevada State Route 723 and the Soda Lakes volcano.

Fallon LORAN-C transmitter used a 625-foot (191 m) tall mast radiator.

The station was closed on February 8, 2010 as a budget cut. The station, and all of the others, were considered to be obsolete with the general availability of GPS systems.

The Fallon station is emitting eLORAN [1] since at least 2025 as part of GRI 5991.

== Reference ==
- 1
