= Soda Lake Geothermal Plant =

Soda Lake I
- Country: United States of America
- Location: Churchill County, Nevada
- Coordinates: 39.555253°N 118.838290°W
- Status: Operational
- Commission date: 1987
- Owner: CYRQ Energy

Geothermal power station
- Type: Binary cycle

Power generation
- Nameplate capacity: 5.1MW

External links
- Website: https://www.cyrqenergy.com/

Soda Lake II
- Country: United States of America
- Location: Churchill County, Nevada
- Coordinates: 39.556320°N 118.849416°W
- Status: Operational
- Commission date: 1991
- Owner: CYRQ Energy

Geothermal power station
- Type: Binary cycle

Power generation
- Nameplate capacity: 18MW

External links
- Website: https://www.cyrqenergy.com/

Soda Lake 3
- Country: United States of America
- Location: Churchill County, Nevada
- Coordinates: 39.560204°N 118.854877°W
- Status: Under construction
- Construction began: 2016
- Owner: CYRQ Energy

Geothermal power station
- Type: Binary cycle

Power generation
- Nameplate capacity: 26.5 MW

External links
- Website: https://www.cyrqenergy.com/

The Soda Lake Geothermal Field is located on the northeast flank of the Soda Lakes volcano, west of the city of Fallon, Nevada in Churchill County.

Exploration of the geothermal site occurred from 1972 to 1986. The Soda Lake I geothermal power plant came online in 1987 and the larger Soda Lake II plant in 1991. Construction of Soda Lake 3 was announced in late 2016. The expansion and upgrades at the combined site are planned to take the generation to a total of 37 megawatts.

Road access to the site is via Nevada State Route 723 from US 50.
