= List of Nevada Wildlife Management Areas =

This is a list of Wildlife Management Areas in Nevada. The Nevada Department of Wildlife either owns or leases about 150,000 acres (230 sq mi) as WMAs. The conservation goal is the protection of wetlands and waterfowl, including the use of WMAs for recreational hunting.

Name	County or counties
Alkali Lake WMA	Lyon
Argenta WMA: Also known as Licking Ranch	Lander County:
Bruneau River WMA	Elko
Carson Lake WMA	Churchill
Fernley WMA	Lyon
Fort Churchill Cooperative WMA	Lyon
Franklin Lake WMA	Elko
Humboldt WMA	Pershing, Churchill
Key Pittman WMA	Lincoln
Mason Valley WMA	Lyon
Overton WMA	Clark
Pole Canyon Cooperative WMA: 4,700 acres (1,900 ha)	Elko County
Scripps WMA	Washoe
Steptoe Valley WMA	White Pine
Wayne E. Kirch WMA	Nye
