= Humboldt Sink =

Dry lakebed in Nevada, United States

- Endorheic basin
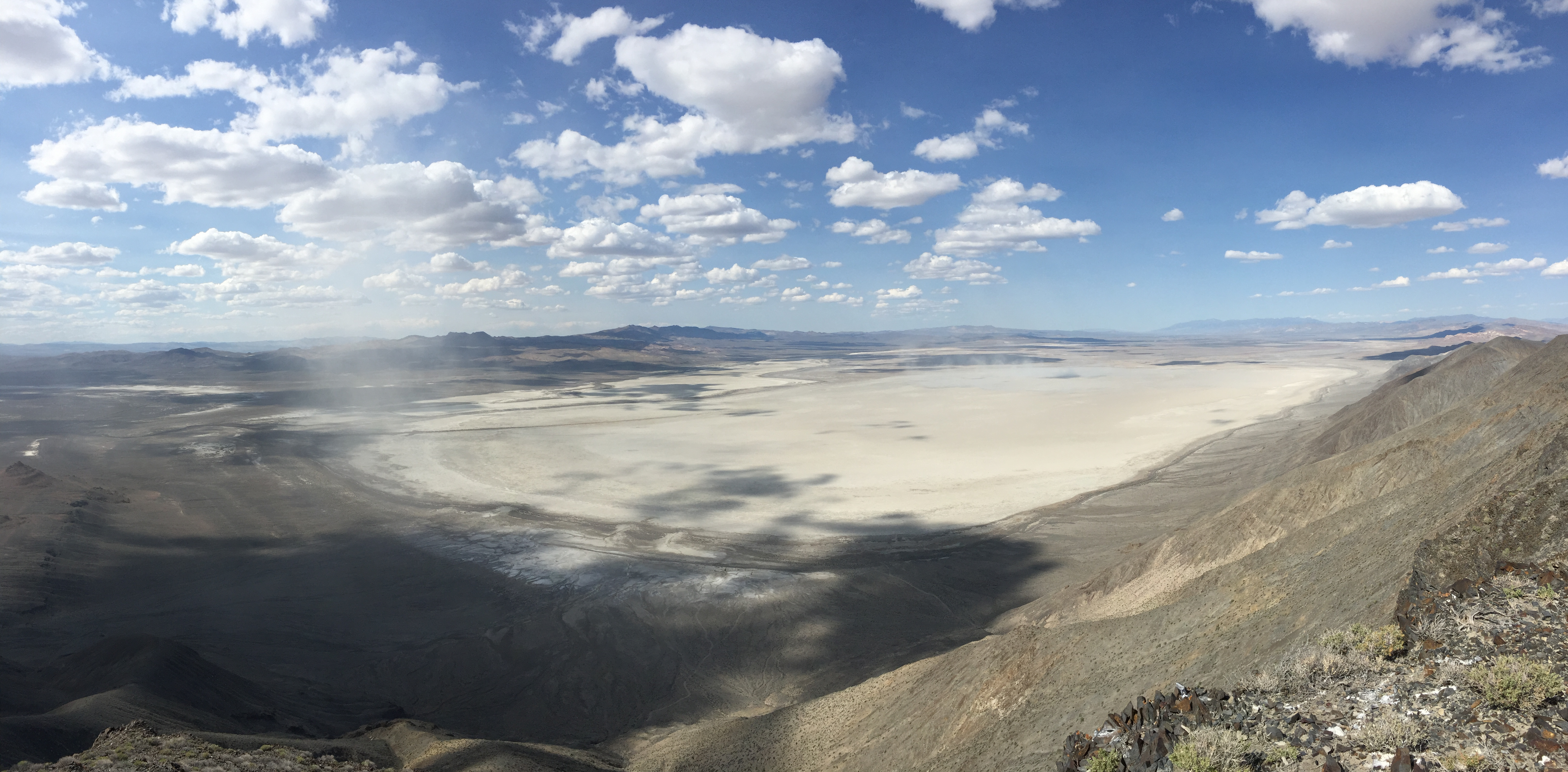
- Panorama of the Humboldt Sink from the West Humboldt Range in Churchill County, Nevada

- Coordinates: 39°58′22″N 118°36′27″W
- Location: Churchill County, Nevada
- Part of: Forty Mile Desert
- Offshore water bodies: Lake Humboldt
- Age: 13,000 years old
- Formed by: Lake Lahontan
- Geology: Horst block, and the presence of Tertiary volcanics and Jurassic limestone
- Etymology: Alexander von Humboldt
- Defining authority: Humboldt Wildlife Management Area

Area
  - Total: 39 square miles (100 km^{2})

Dimensions
  - Length: 11 miles (18 km)
  - Width: 4 miles (6.4 km)
- Elevation: 3,895 feet (1,187 m)
- Volcanic field: Humboldt Mafic Complex

The Humboldt Sink is an intermittent dry lake bed, approximately 11 miles (18 km) long, and 4 miles (6.4 km) across, in northwestern Nevada in the United States. The body of water in the sink is known as Humboldt Lake. The sink and its surrounding area was a notorious and dreaded portion (called the Forty Mile Desert) of overland travel to California during the westward migrations of the mid-1800s, which were largely undertaken along the California Trail.

Humboldt Sink is located between the West Humboldt Range (to the southeast) and the Trinity Range (to the northwest), on the border between Pershing and Churchill counties, approximately 50 miles (80 km) northeast of Reno. It is fed from the northeast by the 330-mile-long (530 km) Humboldt River, the second longest river in the Great Basin of North America (after the Bear River). Interstate 80 (I-80) passes along the northwest side of the sink.

The sink has no natural outlet. A channel connecting it with the Carson Sink was cut by the Nevada Department of Transportation in 1984 to prevent I-80 and the town of Lovelock from flooding after heavy snowfall in the preceding three years. As of 2004, this channel has been dry since 1986. The sink, along with the Carson Sink, is remnants of the larger prehistoric Lake Lahontan that existed at the end of the last ice age, approximately 13,000 years ago.

The sink is protected as part of the Humboldt Wildlife Management Area. Wetlands in and near the sink, such as the Humboldt Salt Marsh provide important nesting, foraging, and resting habitat to large numbers of migratory birds.

The sink has a long history of human habitation. In addition to Lovelock Cave, an outcrop in the West Humboldt Range in which 2000-year-old duck decoys have been found, there is also evidence of huts constructed in the bed of Lake Humboldt. Evidence from these important archaeological sites suggests that Native Americans hunted and fished in the Humboldt Sink during wetter climatic periods.

These landforms are named for the Humboldt River, which is in turn named after German naturalist Alexander von Humboldt.
