= Annie Montague Alexander =

American paleontologist, zoologist and philanthropist (1867–1950)

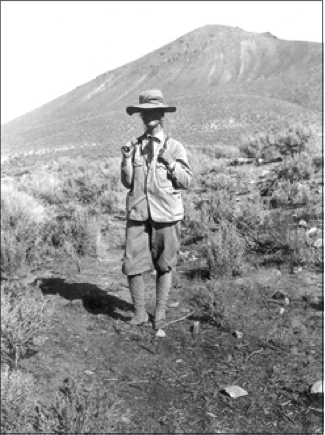
- Annie Montague Alexander, Saurian Expedition 1905
- Born: December 29, 1867; Honolulu, Hawaii
- Died: September 10, 1950 (aged 82); Oakland, California
- Resting place: Makawao Union Church, Maui, HI
- Citizenship: American
- Known for: Founder University of California Museum of Paleontology (UCMP), Founder Museum of Vertebrate Zoology (MVZ)
- Scientific career
- Fields: Paleontology Botany Natural History
- Institutions: University of California, Berkeley

Annie Montague Alexander (29 December 1867 – 10 September 1950) was an explorer, naturalist, paleontological collector, and philanthropist.

She founded the University of California Museum of Paleontology (UCMP) and the Museum of Vertebrate Zoology (MVZ). From its establishment in 1908 until she died in 1950, she financed the museum's collections and supported a series of paleontological expeditions throughout the western United States. Alexander herself took part in many of these expeditions, accumulating a significant collection of fossils and exotic game animals that she would later donate to the museum. Alexander is remembered by the University of California, Berkeley, as one of the "builders of Berkeley" and as the benefactress of the museum.

== Early life ==
Annie Montague Alexander was born on December 29, 1867, in Honolulu. At the time, the islands were part of the Kingdom of Hawaii. She was the granddaughter of New England missionaries in Maui. Her father, Samuel Thomas Alexander, and her uncle, Henry Perrine Baldwin, founded Alexander & Baldwin. Her mother, Martha Cooke, was the daughter of Amos Starr Cooke, the founder of Castle & Cooke. These companies were two of the "Big Five" corporations that started as sugar cane plantations and later dominated the Territory of Hawaii's economy.

Annie Montague was the second of five children. Her youngest brother, Clarence Chambers, was born in 1880 but died in 1884. Her cousins included Henry Alexander Baldwin and Clarence Hyde Cooke, who carried on the family businesses.

She attended Punahou School for one year. In 1882, her family moved to Oakland, California, where she then enrolled in Oakland High School. In 1886, she attended Lasell Seminary for Young Women in Auburndale, Massachusetts.

In 1888, she traveled with her family to Paris and studied painting. The detailed work caused her vision problems and persistent headaches. She returned to Oakland and trained briefly as a nurse. She soon left the program when she found that studying the medical textbooks brought on another bout of headaches and vision problems.

When her father left the business to others to operate, he took Annie, her sister Martha, and a cousin on a 1,500-mile bicycle trip through Europe in 1893. In 1896, Alexander and her uncle explored the South Pacific, stopping in Hong Kong, China, and Singapore. On that same trip, they also explored Java, Samoa, and New Zealand.

In 1899, Annie went camping in Oregon with her friend Martha Beckwith. Alexander's passion for paleontology began on her trip to Crater Lake with Beckwith. In 1900, she started auditing paleontology lectures at the University of California, Berkeley. There, Alexander met Professor John C. Merriam and, as their friendship grew, offered to underwrite his upcoming expeditions. She later participated in Merriam's 1901 Fossil Lake expedition in Oregon and his 1902 and 1903 expeditions to Shasta County in Northern California.

== Early expeditions, 1901–1910 ==
=== Fossil Lake, 1901 ===
In February 1901 John C. Merriam and Alexander began organizing an expedition. They were unable to decide on a location until Merriam proposed a trip to Shasta County where they could collect Triassic vertebrate fossils to which Alexander agreed. Three weeks before departure, Merriam convinced Alexander to instead go to Fossil Lake in south-central Oregon. This dry and arid region had been explored previously beginning in the 1870s and would prove a fruitful location for Alexander. Alexander was attended by Herbert Furlong and William Greeley, two of Merriam's students who were chosen to provide assistance and expertise for her. They planned their route from Northern California up to Fossil Lake and then headed West to Crater Lake before heading back to California. Other participants included Ernest, an African American wagon driver and cook, and a young boy named Willis. Alexander also invited her friend Mary Wilson. The trip lasted from May 30 to August 13 and they returned with nearly 300 pounds in fossils.

=== Shasta County, 1901–1903 ===
==== 1901 ====
This expedition was organized by John C. Merriam and financed by Alexander though she did not attend because she was currently on an expedition to Fossil Lake. Shasta County had captured attention from California Paleontologists in 1893 after James Perrin Smith (of Stanford) searched for ammonites. Though he did find ammonites, he also returned with the first Mesozoic marine vertebrate found in California he named Nothosaurus. In 1895, Smith sent his findings to Merriam and sparked what became Merriam's intense focus on Shasta County.

==== 1902 ====
From June 16 to July 13, Alexander and her team explored along a limestone ridge in Shasta County.

Participants included Vance Osmont, an assistant and student of John C. Merriam, Eustace Furlong, Waldemar Schaller, and Katherine Jones. Jones was in charge of keeping an account of the trip. Alexander's role in the expedition included funding, collecting and, excavating, as well as cooking for the team. The trip was brief but they returned with three significant fossils including Shastasaurus alexandre named in honor of Alexander.

==== 1903 ====
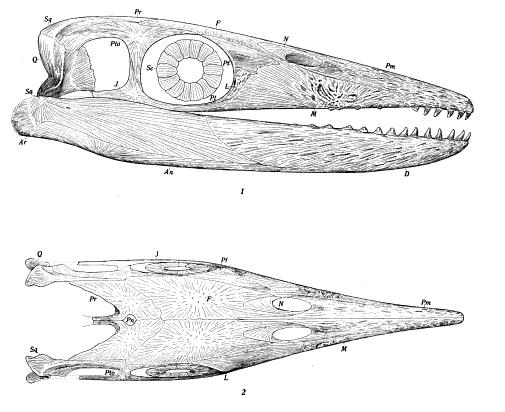
An early reconstruction of Thalattosaurus alexandrae by John C. Merriam

Little is known about this trip beyond its participants and some of its findings. Along with Alexander, the participants were Edna Wemple, Eustace Furlong, Frederick Sylvanus Ray, and Ward Benjamin Esterly. On this trip, Alexander uncovered her first significant fossil that was new to the scientific world which John C. Merriam named in her honor Thalattosaurus alexandrae.

=== Africa, 1904 ===
In 1904, Alexander left on a trip with her father and Thomas L. Gulick, son of missionary Peter Johnson Gulick and younger brother of John Thomas Gulick who was an early developer of theories of evolution. The men were looking forward to hunting big game in Africa, while Annie was collecting fossils and taking pictures. Gulick became ill and died on August 15, 1904, in Kijabe, Kenya. On September 8, the Alexanders reached Victoria Falls. The next day they crossed the Zambezi river and climbed down the canyon for a better view. While she was preparing to take a picture, Samuel was hit by a boulder tossed down from workers above that crushed his foot. Her father died a day later on September 10 after receiving an emergency amputation.

The death of her father had a profound effect on shaping her career as a naturalist. In personal letters after his death, Alexander expressed a need to find a distraction that would prevent her from thinking about the loss of her father. It was then that she decided to dedicate her life to preserving the wild flora and fauna of California and the West Coast.

=== Saurian Expedition, Nevada, 1905 ===
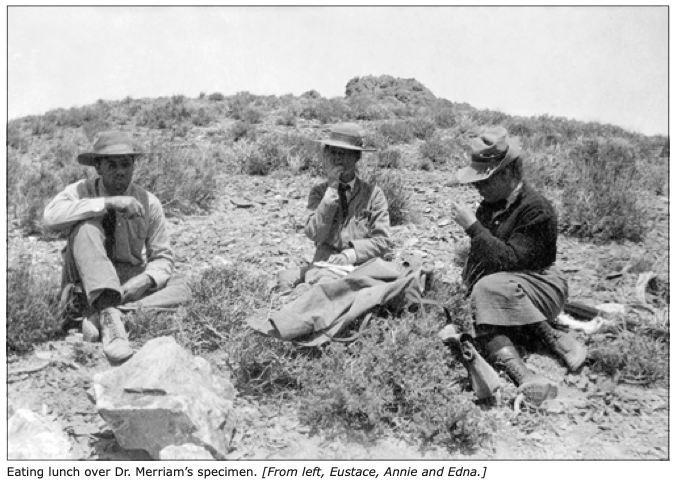
Eustace Furlong, Annie Alexander, and Edna Wemple having lunch on the Saurian Expedition. The caption is the original from her scrapbook that was digitized by the UCMP.

In 1905, she financed and took part in the Saurian Expedition to the West Humboldt Range in Nevada. The expedition discovered many of the finest specimens of ichthyosaur. In 1905, Alexander financed and attended another expedition alongside John C. Merriam and his assistant Eustace L. Furlong. They headed 300 miles west to the West Humboldt Mountain Range located in northwestern Nevada. The expedition lasted only a few months but they returned with many of the finest specimens of ichthyosaur found at that time. During many of her expeditions, Alexander kept a scrapbook containing photos of landscapes, participants, and fossil finds. In her scrapbook from the Saurian Expedition, Annie included photos of herself and Edna Wemple documenting their work in the field.

=== Alaska, 1906–07 ===
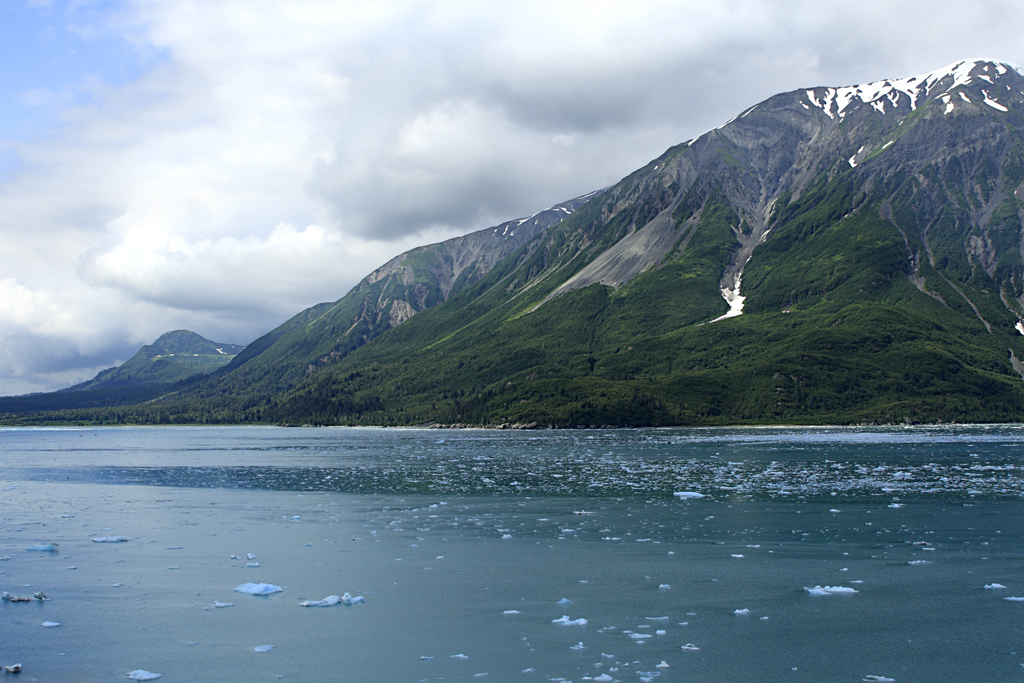
Disenchanment Bay. Alexander and her team arrived here before embarking along the Kenai Peninsula.

Alexander met C. Hart Merriam (cousin of John C. Merriam) in 1904. At the time, Merriam was the chief of the United States Biological Survey and he became interested in Alexander's fossil collection. In one meeting, he recalled stories of Alaska which inspired Alexander to explore again. In the spring of 1906, Alexander and her team left for the Kenai Peninsula. Participants included Edna Wemple and Alvin Seale. The expedition began in southeastern Alaska at Malaspina Glacier and ended at Skilak Lake.

From April to August 1907, Alexander financed and led another trip to Alaska; the expedition to southeastern Alaska included Alexander, Joseph S. Dixon, Chase Littlejohn, Frank Stephens and, Kate Stephens.

=== Vancouver Island, 1910 ===
In 1910, Alexander embarked on a trip north to British Columbia with Louise Kellogg to expand upon the research they had done in Alaska. While there, Alexander enlisted the help of a local trapper named Edward Despard who was tasked with finding mink, marten, raccoons, otters, and beavers. While Despard hunted on his own, Alexander and Kellogg remained together looking for smaller mammals and birds. Together Alexander and Kellogg found 75 song sparrows. The women returned to California with 137 specimens including a cougar, many minks, and a large black bear that Alexander purchased from a farmer.

== The University of California Museum of Paleontology ==
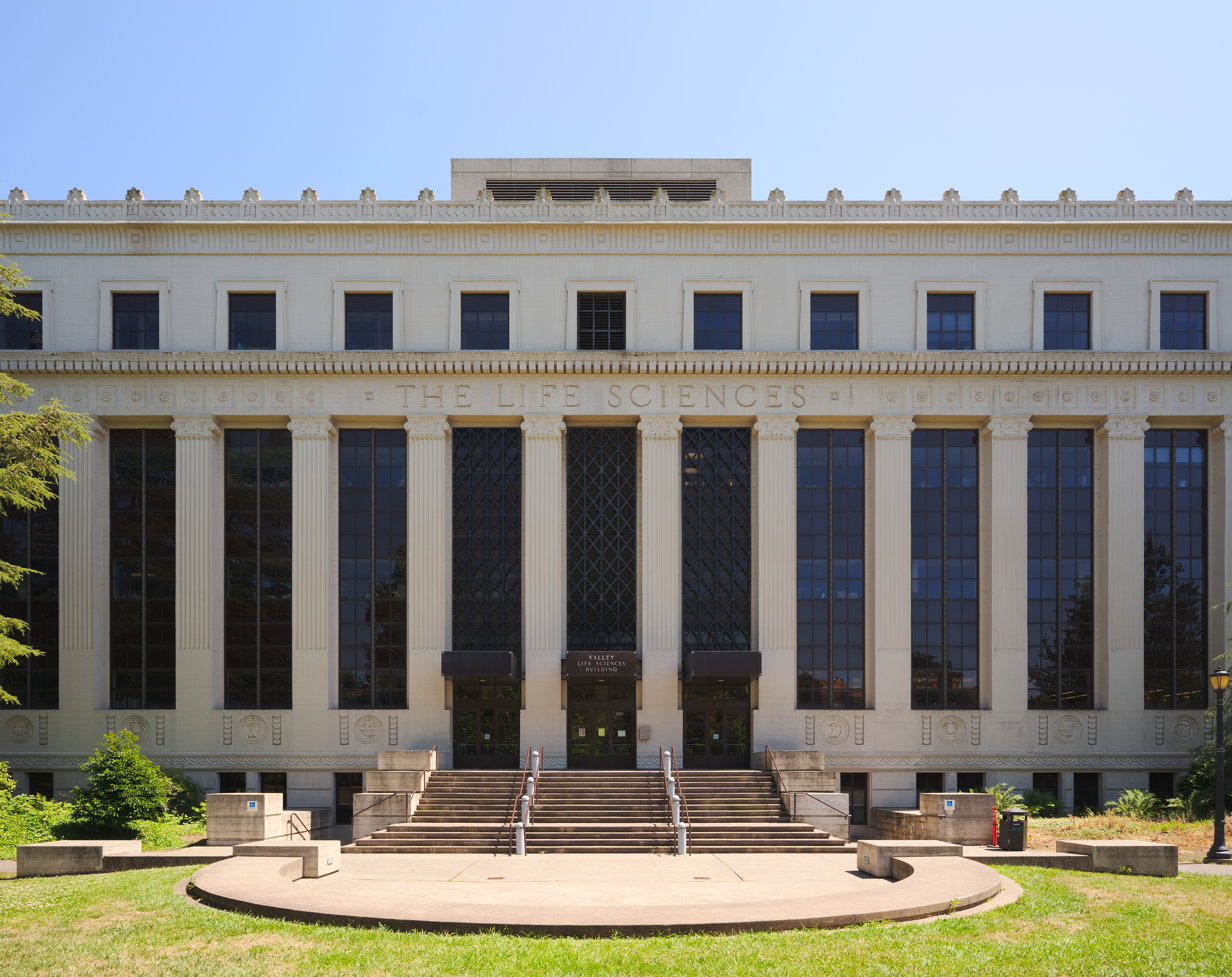
The University of California Museum of Paleontology is housed within the Valley Life Sciences Building on the University of California, Berkeley campus.

After numerous expeditions in Alaska, Alexander had amassed a large collection of both flora and fauna. Moved by the notion that she needed to preserve the wildlife that she saw as rapidly disappearing from the western United States, Alexander proposed and financed a new museum in California. The goal of the museum was to provide paleontological material to researchers on campus to further their studies as well as preserve the declining environment around them for posterity as well as cultivating an interest in natural history.

In 1907, Alexander met Joseph Grinnell, a young scientist from Stanford who had already begun to make a name for himself in the field of zoology. Upon meeting Alexander he expressed his wish that the West Coast had a museum of natural history. Grinnell proposed a museum at Stanford but Alexander stood her ground and she pushed for a museum at the University of California, Berkeley where her passion for paleontology had flourished. Grinnell proposed the name Museum of Vertebrate Zoology and he was named by Alexander as the permanent choice of director. Grinnell held this position until he died in 1939.

While waiting for the museum to open, Alexander embarked on more trips to Alaska with her new companion Louise Kellogg.

In 1909, the museum opened and needed fossils. Merriam, Furlong, Kellogg, and Alexander headed back to Humboldt County, Nevada, in search of fossils. They found wooly rhinoceroses, camels, mastodons, other mammals, lizards, and birds. Throughout their lifetimes, Alexander and Kellogg collected nearly 7,000 specimens of birds, mammals, and amphibians for the museum. They also collected over 17,000 plants for the University Herbarium and contributed thousands of fossils for the UCMP. Alexander remained, until the end of her life, the largest donor and benefactress of the museum helping to fund and fill the museum with everything she found.

In 1920, when Merriam left the University to become president of the Carnegie Institution, the paleontology department was merged with the geology department, displeasing both Merriam and Alexander. Merriam's departure from the museum angered Alexander but her dedication to the museum remained unwavering. She subsequently helped establish the UCMP and created an endowment for its funding. After Merriam's defection, Alexander continued to give money to the university but grew frustrated with the Regents that Merriam was allowed to exert control over her donations. She also helped finance much of the work of William Diller Matthew and his protégé George Gaylord Simpson.

== Later life ==
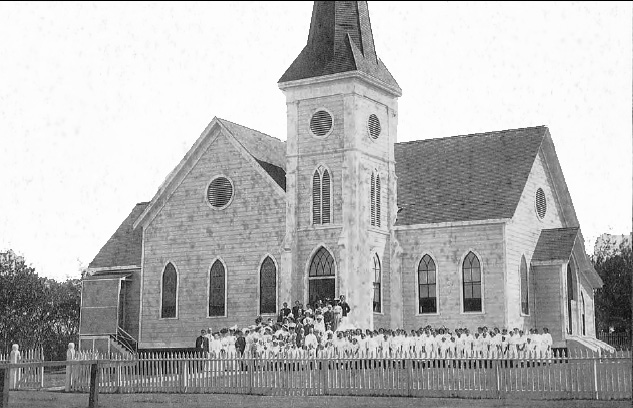
Makawao Union Church, Maui Hawaii 1909. The Makawao Cemetery is where Alexander's ashes were buried.

Alexander shared her life with Kellogg for forty-two years. By all accounts, it was a devoted "Boston marriage." Among other activities, the two ran a working farm together; they raised cattle but eventually switched to asparagus which was a seasonal crop so it left them more time throughout the year to travel. During the summer, they could go on fossil trips and then spend their winters in Hawaii. Both Alexander and Kellogg were dedicated to their findings and on a trip to Hawaii in 1920 they found over 100 species of shells for the Paleontology Department. Alexander continued to finance expeditions and perform fieldwork throughout her life, celebrating her 80th birthday while in the Sierra de la Laguna mountains.

In 1949, before planned her winter trip to Hawaii, Alexander had a stroke and remained in a coma until she died on September 10, 1950, just before her 83rd birthday. Alexander's ashes were returned to Hawaii and were buried at the Makawao Cemetery, Maui near her childhood home.

By the time of her death, Alexander had explored and collected in Oregon, Alaska, Hawaii, Vancouver Island, California, Nevada, Arizona, Utah, New Mexico, Texas, and Mexico.

== Benefaction and investments ==
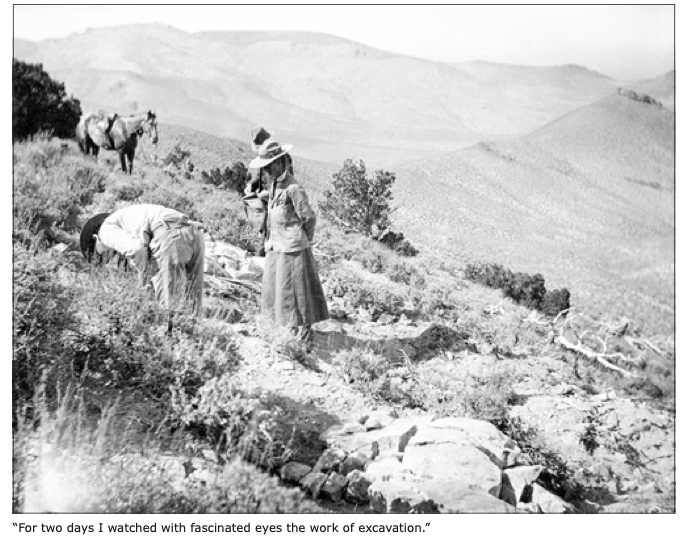
Annie Alexander watching Eustace Furlong excavate on the Saurian Expedition of 1905. This photo and caption are from the 1905 scrapbook.

Throughout her affiliation with U.C. Berkeley, Alexander requested her donations to be marked as given by "a friend of the university" rather than by name. She is remembered today as helping to 'build Berkeley' as well as being the benefactress of many of their most well-known paleontologists.

For more than fifty years, Alexander continued to believe in the work that public education could do. Alexander was an heiress who experienced vastly more freedom than many women of her time and she used her money to expand public education in the hopes that all could appreciate California's wildlife for generations. As a woman with money, Alexander also had an interest in stocks and finances. Alexander once invited a wealthy friend who had encouraged her to invest her fortune in exchange for larger returns to the museum. Alexander gave her friend a tour of the museum and gestured to a group of working students and said "Here are my investments."

Alexander maintained control of the museum until she died in 1950. She wanted to fill the museum with scientists who had "their accomplishments ahead of, rather than behind them." She insisted on this because she believed that this museum could become a place of great authority on the west coast that would enable the careers of many paleontologists. By the time of her death, Alexander, with great help from Kellogg, donated 20,564 specimens to the University of California Museum of Paleontology.

Not only did Alexander establish, finance, and provide specimens for two museums she also helped to bring natural history and its leading scientists into the spotlight. Alexander hired, funded, and collected specimens for men who are recognized as giants of vertebrate zoology and paleontology such as Joseph Grinnell, Alden H. Miller, E. Raymond Hall, John C. Merriam, and Charles L. Camp. Her benefaction and dedication to natural history provided these men the resources they needed and indirectly provided the world with the research they created.

Annie Alexander's philanthropy and contributions to science and the University of California Berkeley were honored by naming one of the falcons nesting on Sather Tower after her.

Through an anonymous donation, Alexander also established in 1920 the Folklore Foundation at Vassar College. The chair created as part of the foundation, was the first chair in folklore at any college or university in the United States. It was held by Martha Beckwith and ended on her retirement in 1938.

== Taxa named for Annie M. Alexander ==
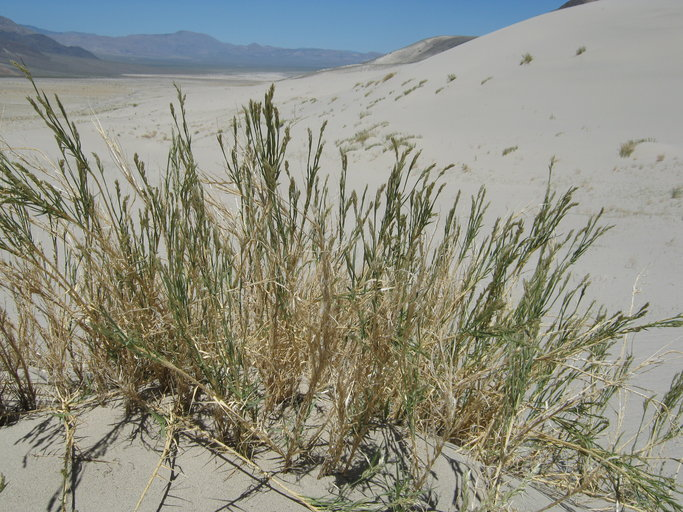
Swallenia alexandrae. A rare grass species found by Alexander and Kellogg in 1942. This grass is still on the federal endangered species list.

- Acrodus alexandre
- Alticamelus alexandre a miocene camel
- Anniealexandria
- Aplodontia alexandrae named by Eustace Furlong
- Bouvardia alexanderae
- Eriogonum ochrocephaum var. alexandrae
- Hydrotherosaurus alexandre a cretaceous plesiosaur named by Samuel Paul Welles
- Ilingoceros alexandrae
- Lagopus alexandrae named by Grinnell
- Lupinus alexandrae
- Mojavemys alexandrae
- Sitta carolinensis alexandrae named by Grinnell
- Scaphiopus alexanderi
- Shastasaurus alexandre a Triassic ichthyosaur named by John C. Merriam
- Swallenia alexandre a rare grass species endemic to California (alt. Ectosperma alexandrae )
- Thalattosaurus alexandre a marine reptile from the Late Triassic named by John C. Merriam
- Thomomys alexandrae
- Ursus alexandre a subspecies of Alaskan grizzly bear named by John C. Merriam
- Lake Alexander in Alaska (named after the Alaska expedition of 1907)

== Family tree ==
Alexander & Baldwin family tree

William P. Alexander (1805–1884)	Mary Ann McKinney (1810–1888)	Amos Starr Cooke (1810–1871)	Juliette Montague (1812–1896)	Dwight Baldwin (1798–1886)	Charlotte Fowler (1805–1873)	J. W. Smith (1810–1887
David Dwight Baldwin (1831–1912)	W. O. Smith (1848–1929)
William D. Alexander (1833–1913)	Abigail Baldwin (1847–1912)	Samuel T. Alexander (1836–1904)	Martha Eliza Cooke	Ann Elizabeth Alexander (1843–1940)	Henry P. Baldwin (1842–1911)	Emily Whitney Alexander (1846–1943)
Agnes Alexander (1875–1971)	Annie Montague Alexander (1867–1950)	C.W. Dickey (1871–1942)	Belle Dickey (1880–1972)	James Dole (1877–1958)	Henry Alexander Baldwin (1871–1946)	Ethel Frances Smith (1879–1967)
J. Walter Cameron (1895–1976)	Francis Baldwin (1904–1996)
Colin C. Cameron (1927–1992) (Kapalua)
