= Humboldt Salt Marsh =

Coordinates: 39°49′36″N 117°59′08″W

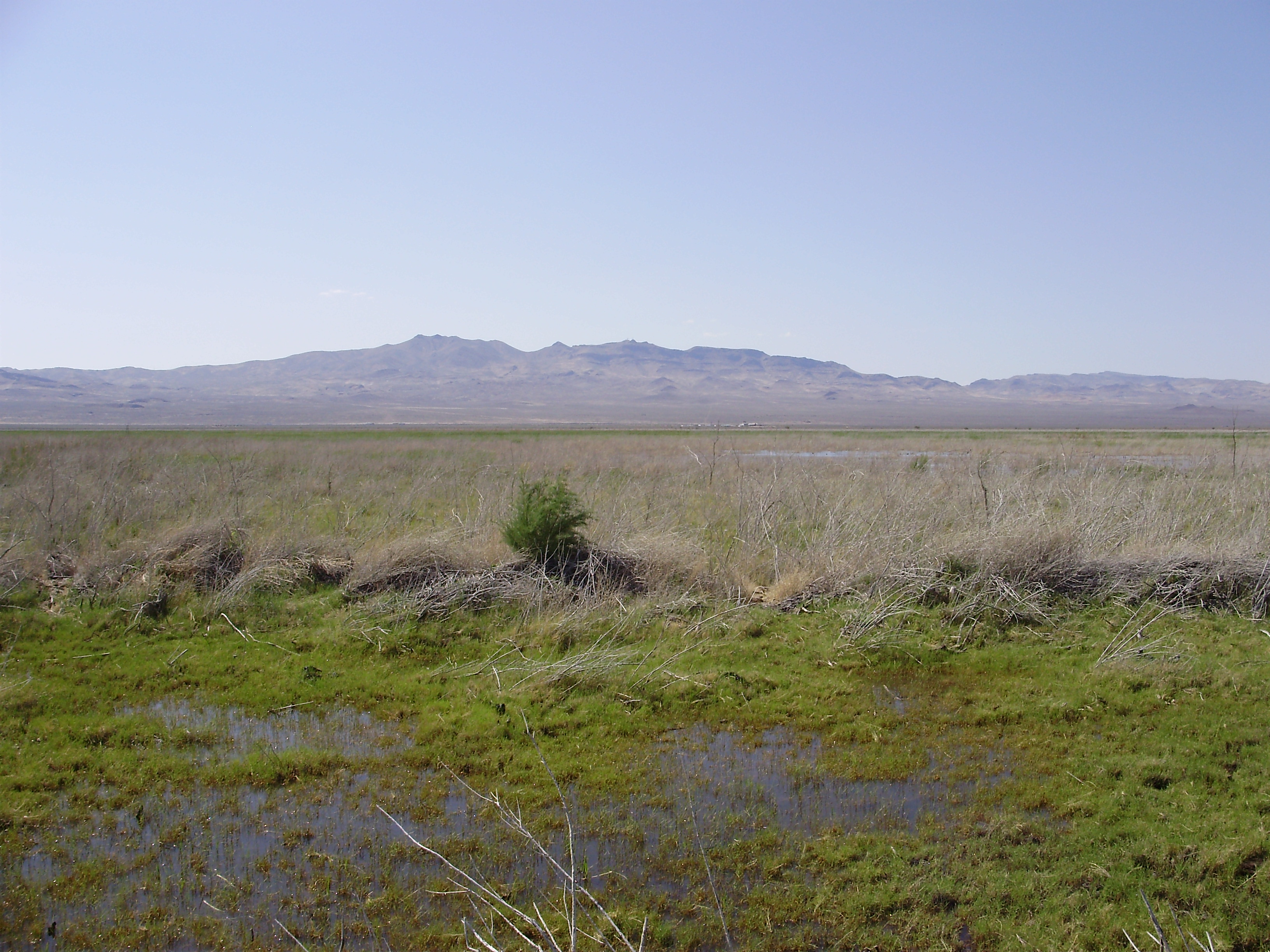
- The Humboldt Salt Marsh

Location
- Country: United States
- State: Nevada
- Region: Humboldt Basin
- County: Churchill County, Nevada

The Humboldt Salt Marsh in the Humboldt Sink of northwestern Nevada is a wetland that is 1 of 2 salt marshes within the state (cf. Tonopah Wetland in the Tonopah Basin). It is protected within the Humboldt Wildlife Management Area.
