= Ragtown, Nevada =

Ragtown
- Location within Nevada Location within the United States
- 39°30′14″N 118°55′01″W

Nevada Historical Marker
- Reference no.: 19

Ragtown, Nevada, is a Churchill County ghost town of an abandoned 1854 trading post west of Fallon.

== History ==
Twelve miles northwest of Fallon exhausted immigrants in 1854 recuperated alongside the Carson River after a trip across the Forty Mile Desert. The station was named because of the many rags cast off by the travelers. The tattered garments after being washed were hung in the bushes to dry. In 1855, Jules Remey and Julius Brenchley stated that it consists of "three huts, formed by poles covered with rotten canvas full of holes."

The Ragtown post office was active from May 14, 1864, to May 29, 1867, and from May 5, 1884, to April 19, 1887.

Leeteville was a post office that existed from January 28, 1895 to June 12, 1907 named for James Leete. Esther M. Leete was the first postmistress.

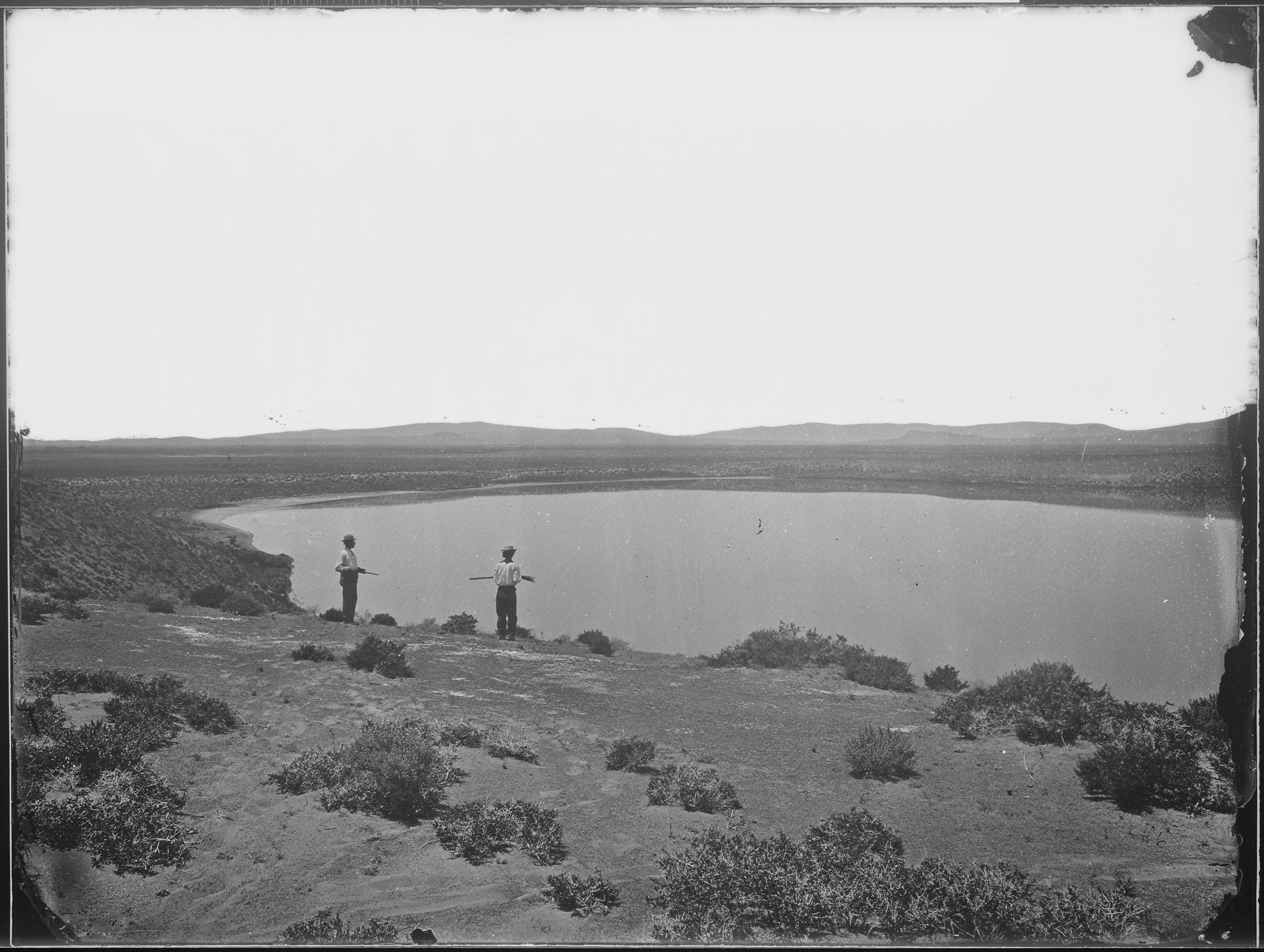
Desert Lake, near Ragtown, Western Nevada, ca. 1867 by Timothy H. O'Sullivan

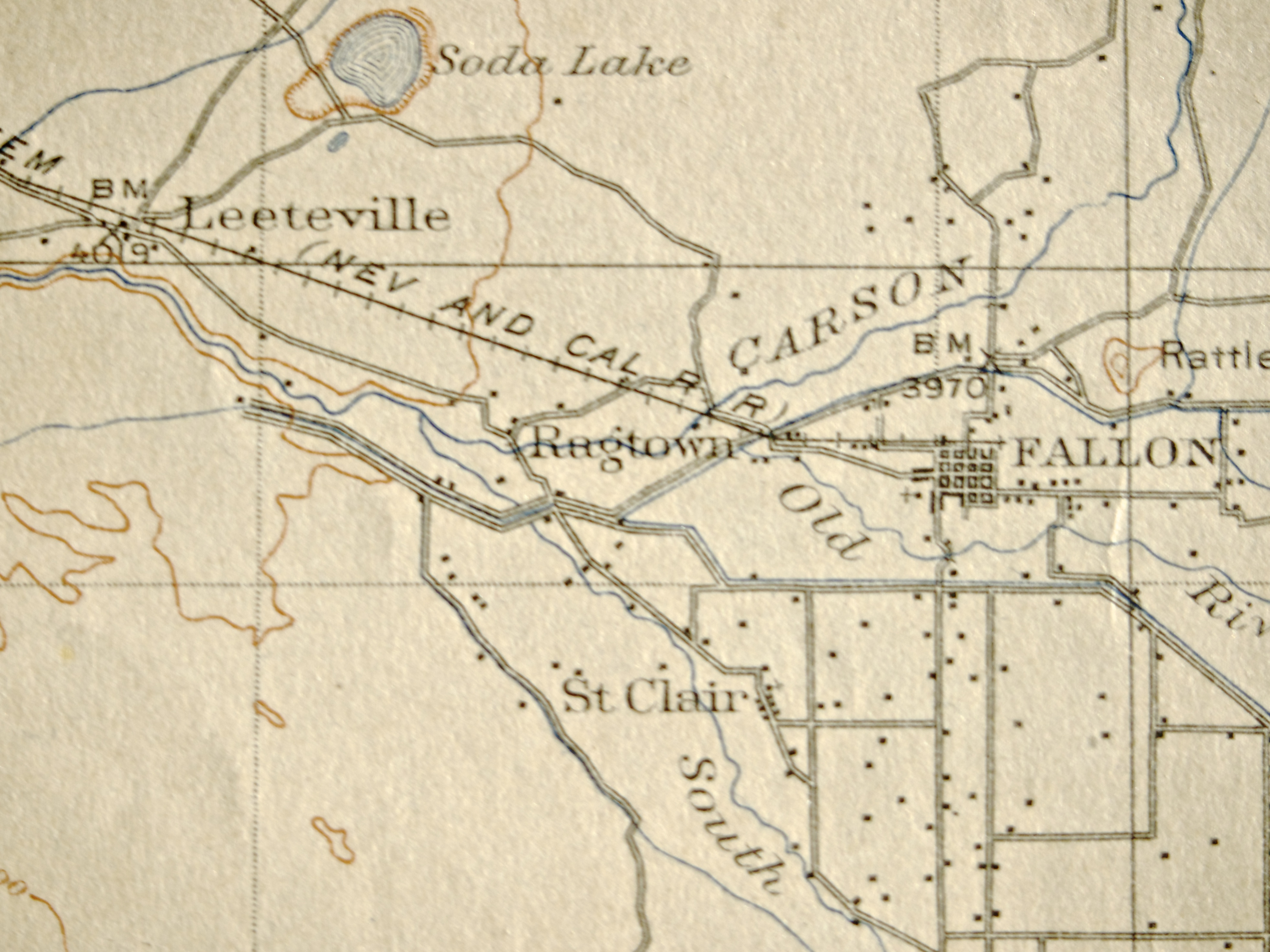
Ragtown, Leeteville, St Clair, and Fallon Nevada as mapped in 1910. Leeteville location is where the original Ragtown was established.

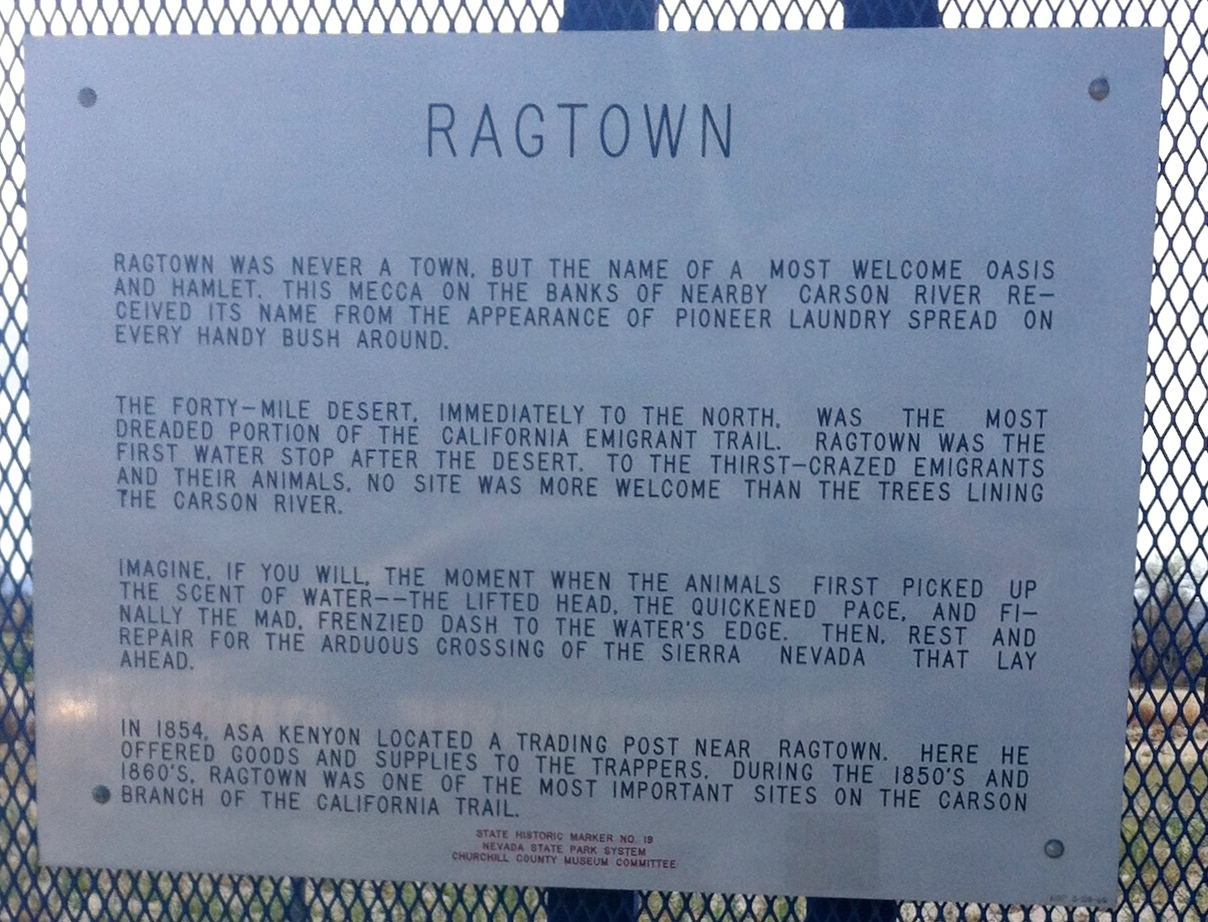
Ragtown highway marker near Fallon

== See also ==
- Leete, Nevada
