= Topog Peak =

Mountain in the state of Nevada

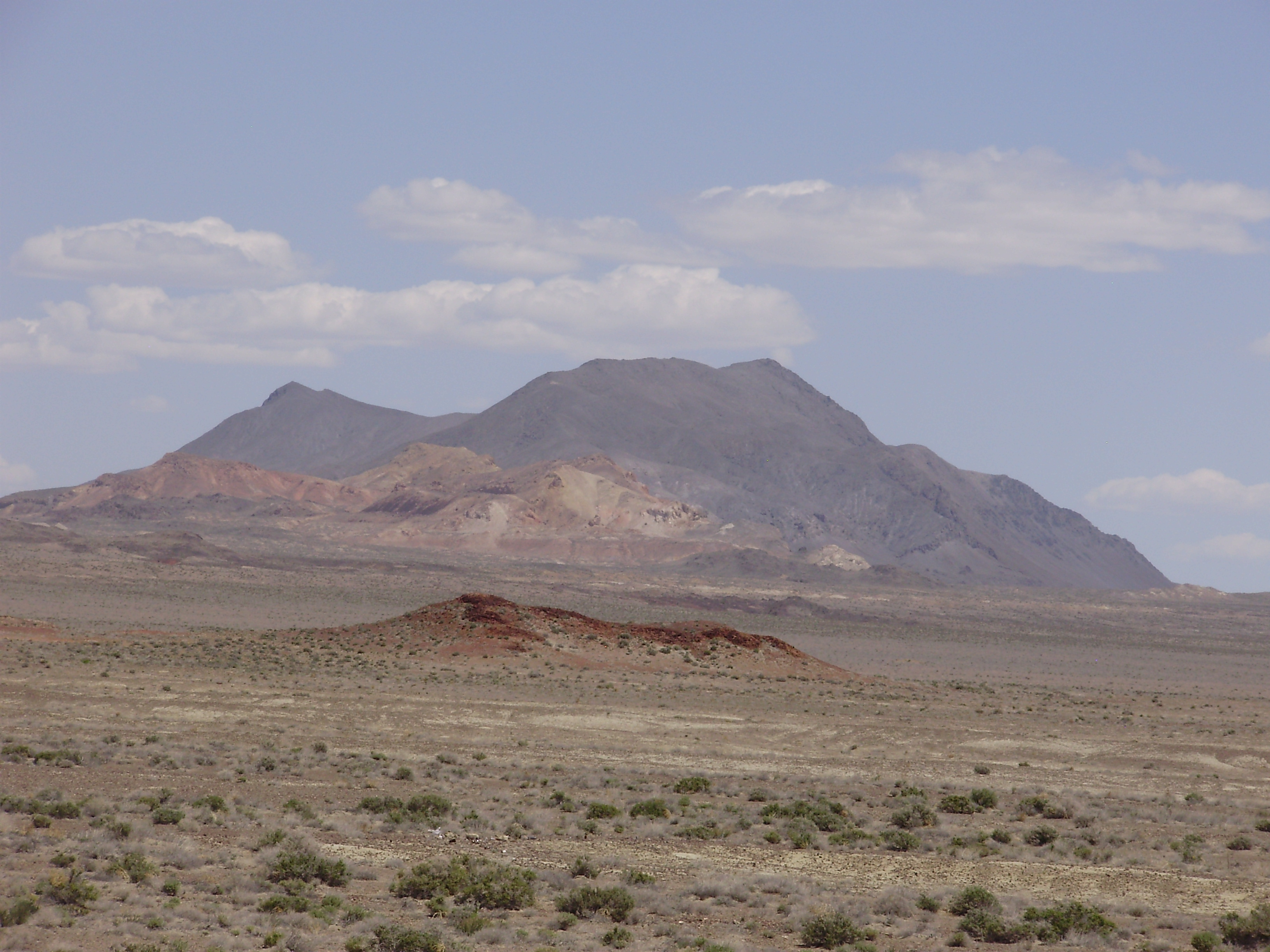

Highest point
- Elevation: 5,534 ft (1,687 m)
- Prominence: 234 ft (71 m)
- Coordinates: 39°53′12″N 118°39′29″W

Geography
- Location within Nevada
- Location: Churchill County, Nevada, U.S.
- Parent range: West Humboldt Range
- Topo map: OCALA

Topog Peak is a mountain in the West Humboldt Range of Churchill County, in Nevada, United States.

== Summit panorama ==
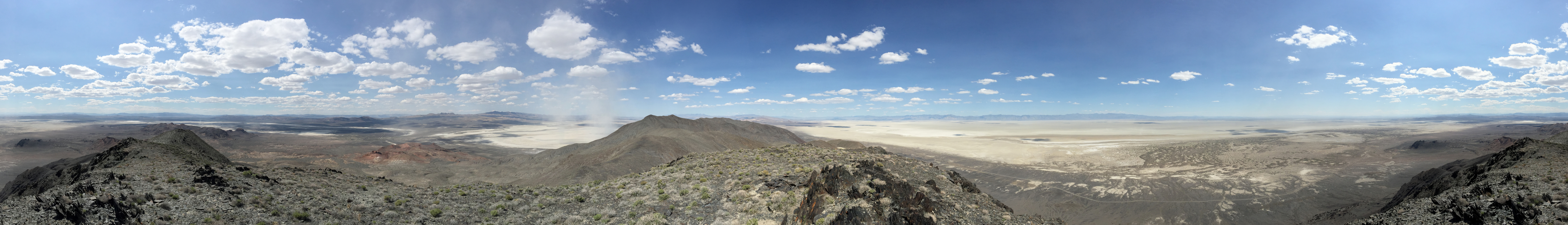
360-degree panorama from the summit of Topog Peak
