= Rattlesnake Hill (Churchill County, Nevada) =

Mountain in Nevada, United States

Coordinates: 39°29′24″N 118°45′08″W

Rattlesnake Hill is a summit in the U.S. state of Nevada. The elevation is 4,163 feet (1,269 m).

Rattlesnake Hill was so named on account of rattlesnakes on and around the summit.
