= Lake Humboldt =

Lake in Nevada, United States

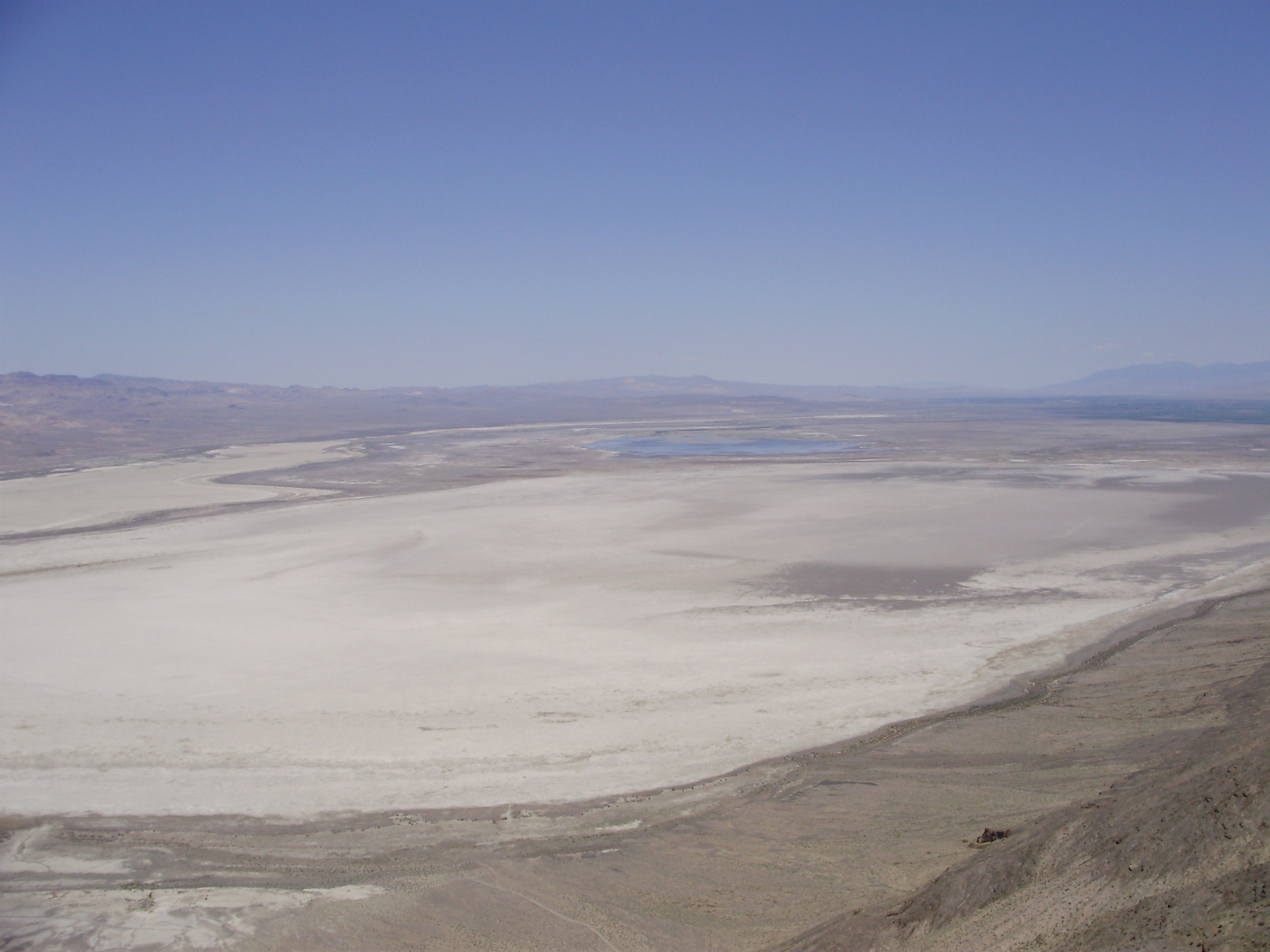
- Humboldt Sink and Lake

- Location in Nevada
- Location: Churchill / Pershing counties, Nevada, United States
- Coordinates: 40°00′02.88″N 118°37′27.12″W
- Type: Endorheic
- Primary inflows: Humboldt River
- Primary outflows: none (Humboldt Sink)
- Basin countries: United States

Lake Humboldt or Humboldt Lake is an endorheic basin lake in northern Churchill County and southern Pershing County in the state of Nevada in the United States. The lake has the name of Alexander von Humboldt, a German natural scientist.

The lake receives the Humboldt River from the north but has no outlet. Humboldt Sink, an intermittent extension of the lake to the south, crosses into northern Churchill County. Since the lake is fed by a freshwater source but has no outlet, its water varies between brackish and extremely salt-laden depending on its distance from the inlet.
