= Lake Lahontan =

Former lake in Nevada, California, and Oregon in the United States

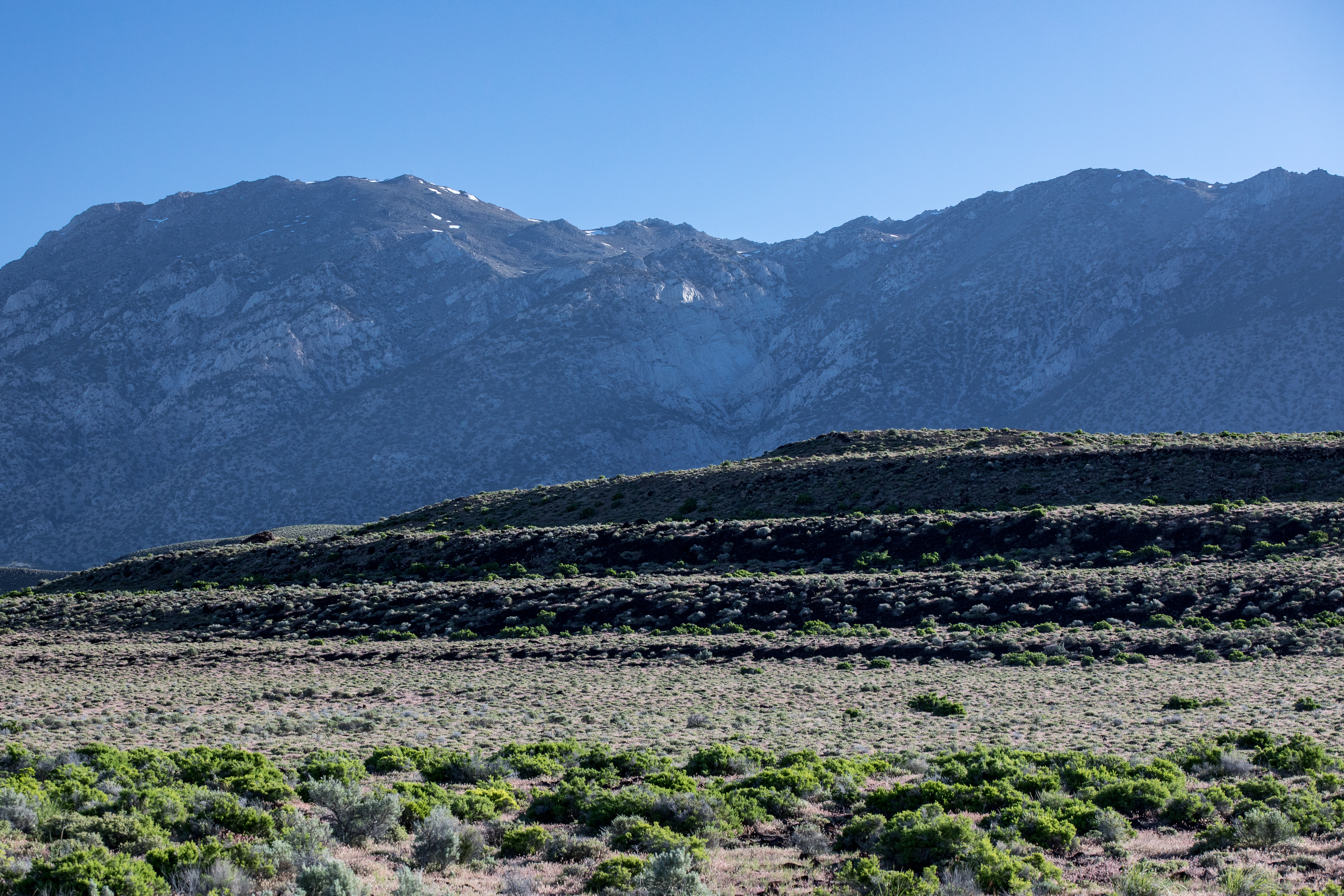
- Lake Lahontan lacustrine terraces, May 2010

- Location within Nevada Location within the United States
- Interactive map of Lake Lahontan
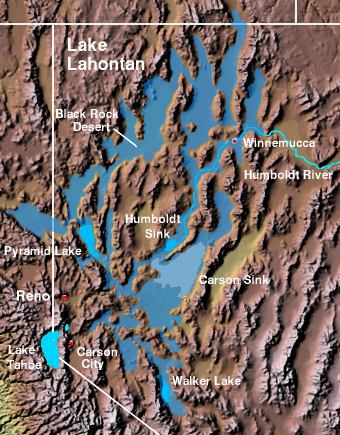
- Extent of prehistoric Lake Lahontan
- Location: Northwestern Nevada, parts of northeastern California and southern Oregon
- Coordinates: 39.8°N 118.5°W
- Type: Endorheic prehistoric lake
- Etymology: Louis-Armand de Lom d'Arce de Lahontan, Baron de Lahontan
- Part of: Great Basin
- Basin countries: United States
- First flooded: approx. 12,700 years ago
- Surface area: 8,500 square miles (22,000 km^{2})
- Max. depth: 500 to 900 feet (150 to 270 m)
- Surface elevation: 4,157 feet (1,267 m)

Lake Lahontan was a large endorheic prehistoric lake during the Pleistocene that occupied modern northwestern Nevada and extended into northeastern California and southern Oregon in the United States.

== Description ==
The area of the former lake is a large portion of the Great Basin that borders the Sacramento River watershed to the west.

The lake was named by Clarence King during the Geological Exploration of the Fortieth Parallel. The name honors Louis-Armand de Lom d'Arce de Lahontan, Baron de Lahontan, a French soldier and explorer.

== History ==
Lake Lahontan and other Late Pleistocene paleolakes in the Great Basin (such as Lake Bonneville) during the last major global glaciation. Lake Lahontan is shown in the context of western North America and the southern margins of the Laurentide and Cordilleran ice sheets.

At its peak approximately 12,700 years ago (during a period known as the Sehoo Highstand), the lake had a surface area of over 8,500 square miles (22,000 km^{2}), with its largest component centered at the location of the present Carson Sink. Near present day Pyramid Lake the depth of the lake was then about 900 feet (270 m) and 500 feet (150 m) at what is present day Black Rock Desert. Lake Lahontan, during this most recent glacial period, would have been one of the largest lakes in North America.

Natural climate change around the end of the Pleistocene epoch led to a gradual desiccation of ancient Lake Lahontan. The lake had largely disappeared in its extended form by about 9,000 years ago. As the surface elevation dropped, the lake broke up into series of smaller lakes, most of which rapidly dried up, leaving only a playa. These playas include the Black Rock Desert, the Carson Sink, and the Humboldt Sink. The only modern remnants existing as true lakes are Pyramid Lake and Walker Lake. Winnemucca Lake has been dry since the 1930s and Honey Lake periodically desiccates. The ancient shoreline is evidenced by tufa formations throughout the area.

Surprisingly, the watershed feeding Lake Lahontan is not thought to have been significantly wetter during its highstand than it is currently. Rather, its desiccation is thought to be mostly due to increase in the evaporation rate as the climate warmed. Recent computer simulations (using the DSSAM Model and other techniques) indicate, if precipitation and evaporation rates within the watershed were maintained at their historical yearly maximum and minimum, respectively, and if diversions of the Truckee River ceased, the Ice Age extent of Lake Lahontan might return.

Archaeological evidence along the shore indicates the existence of the lake coincided roughly with the first appearance of humans in the region. The Lahontan cutthroat trout evolved as a predator species within the waters of Lake Lahontan, feeding on native chub and sucker. This subspecies of cutthroat trout survives today in tributary rivers of the Great Basin, and has been reintroduced to Pyramid Lake and Walker Lake after being extirpated during the 20th century.

== See also ==
- Lahontan Valley
- Lake Bonneville
- Lake Corcoran
- Lake Modoc
- Pluvial lake
- Relict dace
