= List of Nevada historical markers =

Nevada historical markers identify significant places of interest in Nevada's history. The Historic Marker Program was initiated by the Nevada State Legislature in 1967 to bring the state's heritage to the public's attention with on-site markers. Because of budget cuts the program became dormant in 2009.

List of Nevada historical markers
#	Marker name	County	Location	Notes
1	Empire and the Carson River Mills	Carson City	39.187308°N 119.706364°W	
2	Pioneer Memorial Park	Humboldt	40.978823°N 117.741971°W	
3	West End of Hastings Cutoff	Elko		
4	Junction House—The First Settlement	Washoe	39.488881°N 119.794943°W	
5	Pioche	Lincoln	37.926679°N 114.449250°W	
6	El Dorado Canyon	Clark	35.827629°N 114.936453°W	
7	Dayton	Lyon	39.236257°N 119.589297°W	
8	Austin	Lander	39.49°N 117.07°W	
9	Copper Country	White Pine		
10	Sand Mountain	Churchill		
11	Eureka	Eureka		
12	Nevada's Birthplace	Douglas		
13	The Comstock Lode	Storey		
14	Goldfield	Esmeralda		
15	Tonopah	Nye		
16	Mineral County	Mineral		
17	Pershing County	Pershing		
18	Pyramid Lake	Washoe	39.902897°N 119.565775°W	
19	Ragtown	Churchill	39.505722222222°N 118.91928055556°W	
20	Columbus	Esmeralda		
21	The Humboldt Canal	Humboldt		
22	Humboldt River	Humboldt		
23	Humboldt House	Pershing		
24	Olinghouse	Washoe		
25	Nevada's Capitol	Carson City		
26	Forty-Mile Desert	Churchill		
27	Grimes Point	Churchill		Prehistoric rock art site
28	Mark Twain	Storey		
29	Chinese in Nevada	Washoe	39.534713°N 119.753431°W	
30	Reno	Washoe	39.524254°N 119.812417°W	
31	The Old Spanish Trail (1829-1850)	Clark	36.804102°N 114.068703°W	
32	The Old Spanish Trail (1829-1850)	Clark	36.181224°N 115.133064°W	
33	The Old Spanish Trail (1829-1850)	Clark	36.046865°N 115.406494°W	
34	The Old Spanish Trail (1829-1850)	Clark	36.01835°N 115.506856°W	
35	Las Vegas Mormon Fort and Rancho	Clark	36.1808082°N 115.133092403°W	Nevada's oldest building
36	Moapa Valley	Clark		
37	Powell of the Colorado	Clark		
38	Pahranagat Valley	Lincoln		
39	Panaca	Lincoln		Southern Nevada's first permanent settlement, from 1864
40	Las Vegas (The Meadows)	Clark	36.171806°N 115.189470°W	
41	Pueblo Grande de Nevada	Clark	36.531298°N 114.441412°W	
42	Big Smoky Valley	Nye		
43	Derby Diversion Dam	Washoe		
44	Carson City	Carson City		
45	Humboldt Wells	Elko		
46	Pilot Peak	Elko		
47	Fort Halleck Military Reservation	Elko		1867-1886
48	Tuscarora	Elko		
49	Applegate-Lassen Emigrant Trail Cutoff	Pershing		
50	Carlin Canyon	Elko		
51	Schellbourne	White Pine	39.797166666667°N 114.74116666667°W	
52	Cherry Creek	White Pine		
53	Hamilton	White Pine		
54	Ward Mining District	White Pine		
55	Caliente (Culverwell's Ranch)	Lincoln	37.614345°N 114.512537°W	
56	Virgin Valley	Clark		
57	Old Boundary (Nevada's Southern Boundary 1861-1867)	Lincoln	37.044596°N 114.984411°W	
58	Old Boundary (Nevada's Southern Boundary 1861-1867)	Nye	37.002016°N 116.725944°W	
59	Stokes Castle	Lander		
60	Hawthorne (Present Mineral County Seat—Former Esmeralda County Seat)	Mineral		
61	Mound House	Lyon		
62	Truckee River – West	Washoe	39.509479°N 119.936821°W	
63	Truckee River – East	Washoe	39.550130°N 119.573714°W	
64	Ophir	Nye		
65	Palisade	Eureka		
66	Jacobsville	Lander		
67	Austin Churches	Lander		
68	Wadsworth	Washoe		
69	Jarbidge, Nevada	Elko		
70	Bliss Mansion	Carson City		
71	Methodist Church of Carson City	Carson City		
72	Nevada State Children's Home	Carson City		
73	Unknown Soldiers	Elko		
74	Wellington	Lyon		
75	Government Building	Carson City		
76	Eagle Valley	Carson City		
77	Dat-So-La-Lee	Carson City		
78	Orion Clemens' Home	Carson City		
79	Civil War Plot	Washoe	39.536177°N 119.820027°W	
80	Eureka County Courthouse	Eureka		
81	Grand Army Of The Republic Memorial Tree	Washoe	39.5362352°N 119.8170339°W	
82	Diamond Valley	Eureka		
83	Rock Creek (Cold Springs Station)	Churchill		
84	Jedediah Strong Smith (Explorer of the Western Wilderness)	White Pine	39.291497°N 114.837905°W	(reported missing since 2013)
85	Sutro	Lyon		
86	Tule Springs	Clark		Archeological Site
87	Savage Mansion (c. 1863)	Storey		
88	Sparks	Washoe	39.538231°N 119.7670342°W	
89	Paradise Valley	Humboldt		
90	Delamar	Lincoln		"The Widow Maker" (1893-1909)
91	Stewart Indian School	Carson City		
92	Candelaria and Metallic City	Mineral		
93	Panaca Mercantile Store	Lincoln		Built in 1868 as a cooperative for local commerce and trade from Utah
94	The Winters Ranch (Rancho del Sierra)	Washoe		
95	Battle Mountain	Lander		
96	Round Mountain	Nye	38.74277°N 117.124042°W	
97	Manhattan "The Pine Tree Camp"	Nye		
98	Osceola (1872-1940)	White Pine	39.071336111111°N 114.44954722222°W	
99	Taylor	White Pine		
100	Nevada Northern Railway	White Pine		
101	Miller's	Esmeralda		
102	Goodsprings	Clark	35.832203°N 115.434320°W	Mining District (1856-1957)
103	Gypsum Cave	Clark		
104	The Camel Corps	Clark	35.172101°N 114.710793°W	Currently MIA, Removed May 2015. Visible on Google street view 2011 image
105	Golconda	Humboldt		
106	Elko	Elko		
107	Elko Airport	Elko		Terminus of the First Commercial Air Mail Route
108	Ruby Valley Pony Express Station	Elko		Reconstructed
109	Lamoille Valley	Elko		
110	Wagon Jack Shelter	Churchill		
111	Edwards Creek Valley	Churchill		
112	Carlin	Elko		
113	Wabuska	Lyon		
114	Franktown	Washoe		
115	Potosi	Clark	36.000990°N 115.485413°W	
116	Searchlight	Clark	35.468373°N 114.922612°W	
117	Kingsbury Grade	Douglas	38.965531°N 119.839669°W	
118	Luther Canyon	Douglas		Fay Canyon
119	Reul Colt Gridley	Lander		
120	Walley's Hot Springs	Douglas		
121	Mottsville	Douglas	38.931094°N 119.840094°W	
122	Sheridan	Douglas		
123	Cradlebaugh Bridge	Douglas		
124	Boyd Toll Road	Douglas		
125	Twelve Mile House	Douglas		
126	Double Springs, Nevada	Douglas		
127	Courthouse Site (1865-1907)	Lyon		
128	The Great Train Robbery (Nevada)	Washoe	39.517531°N 119.9890372°W	
129	Gardnerville	Douglas		
130	Minden	Douglas		
131	Dresslerville	Douglas		
132	Mackay Mansion	Storey		
133	Fish Lake Valley	Esmeralda		
134	Trans-Sierran Pioneer Flight	Carson City		(March 22, 1919)
135	New Pass Station	Churchill		
136	Toquima Cave	Lander		
137	Hickison Summit	Lander		
138	Belmont	Nye		
139	The Old Spanish Trail (Journey of Death)	Clark		
140	The Old Spanish Trail (Garces Expedition)	Clark	35.106696°N 114.650784°W	
141	The Old Spanish Trail (Armijo's Route)	Clark	36.097650°N 114.904663°W	
142	The Old Spanish Trail (Mountain Springs Pass)	Clark	35.998436°N 115.447723°W	
143	Sarah Winnemucca Hopkins	Humboldt		1844-1891
144	Fort McDermitt	Humboldt		
145	Unionville (Pershing County)	Pershing		
146	McDermitt Indian Reservation	Humboldt		Northern Paiute
147	A Home of Early Man	Churchill		
148	The Two Battles Of Pyramid Lake	Washoe		
149	High Rock Canyon	Washoe		
150	Nevada's First State Park	Clark		
151	Duck Valley Indian Reservation	Elko		
152	Gerlach	Washoe		
153	Jarbidge Community Hall	Elko		
154	Belleville	Mineral		
155	Silver Peak	Esmeralda		Discovered 1863
156	Gold Point	Esmeralda		
157	Lida	Esmeralda		
158	Palmetto	Esmeralda		
159	Ione	Nye		
160	Panaca Spring	Lincoln		Warm spring and source of Meadow Valley's fertile lands
161	Churchill County Courthouse	Churchill		
162	Camp McGarry	Humboldt		
163	Chinatown	Lyon		Early Name of Dayton
164	Button Point	Humboldt		
165	Nevada Test Site	Nye	36° 35′ 33.49″ N, 116° 01′ 42.01″ W	Nevada Historic Marker No. 165, Nevada Test Site
166	Bowers Mansion	Washoe		
167	Valmy	Humboldt		
168	Arrowhead Trail (1914-1924)	Clark		
169	Glendale School	Washoe	39.534582°N 119.7554212°W	
170	Eureka Sentinel Building	Eureka		
171	Chief Tecopa (Peacemaker of the Paiutes)	Nye		
172	Tybo	Nye		
173	Beatty (Center of the Gold Railroads—"Chicago of the West")	Nye		
173	Tate's Stage Station (1886-1901)	Nye		
174	Blair	Esmeralda		
175	Stewart-Nye Residence	Carson City		
176	The Surveyors (Nevada)	Lander		
177	Desert Well Station (Overland Mail and Stage Station)	Lyon		
178	Hazen	Churchill		
179	First Air Flights in Nevada	Carson City		
180	The Warm Springs Hotel	Carson City		
181	The Washo Indians	Carson City		
182	Panaca Ward Chapel	Lincoln		Oldest building in Lincoln County, built in 1867-68 as a LDS Church meetinghouse
183	Walker River Reservation	Mineral		
184	Ward Charcoal Ovens	White Pine		
185	McCone's Foundries	Lyon		
186	Union Hotel and Post Office	Lyon		
187	The Cattle Industry	Eureka		
188	Von Schmidt State Boundary Monument	Clark	35.014259°N 114.661825°W	
189	Southern Pacific Railroad Yards	Washoe	39.534694°N 119.7531762°W	
190	Original Homesite of a Las Vegas Pioneer "Pop" Squires (1865-1958)	Clark	36.16468°N 115.140812°W	
191	Verdi	Washoe		
192	Buckland's Station (On the California Emigrant Trail)	Lyon	39.294221°N 119.251592°W	
193	Historic Flume and Lumber Yard	Carson City		
194	Gardner's Ranch	Carson City		
195	The Last Spike	Clark	35.823763°N 115.287155°W	
196	The United States Mint at Carson City, Nevada	Carson City		
197	Arrowhead Trail - Henderson	Clark	35.995946°N 114.961606°W	Arrowhead Trail Historic Marker
198	Steamboat Springs	Washoe		
199	Camels in Dayton	Lyon		
200	Hall's Station	Lyon		
201	Wonder Historic Mining Camp	Churchill		Historic Mining Camp—1906-1919
202	Fairview	Churchill		1905-1917
203	Bullionville	Lincoln		
204	Jackrabbit	Lincoln		
205	Crystal Springs	Lincoln		
206	Hiko	Lincoln		
207	Carson Valley	Douglas		
208	International Hotel	Lander		First commercial building constructed in Austin in 1863
209	Chollar Mine	Storey		
210	Nevada-California-Oregon Railroad Depot	Washoe	39.531085°N 119.8101022°W	
211	Old Geiger Grade	Washoe		
212	Galena	Washoe		
213	Lakeview	Carson City		
214	Rafael Rivera	Clark	36.083692°N 115.072761°W	
215	Lahontan Dam	Churchill		
216	Stillwater	Churchill		
217	Tate's Stage Station	Nye		
218	Geiger Station (Magnolia House)	Washoe		
219	Glenbrook	Douglas		
220	The Fight of the Century	Washoe	39.533192°N 119.7970442°W	
221	Sand Harbor	Washoe	39.2005193°N 119.9307248°W	
222	Tannehill Cabin—One of Eureka's First Houses	Eureka		
223	Devil's Gate	Lyon		
224	Kyle Ranch	Clark		
225	Spooner Area	Douglas		Logging and Lumber Period: 1868-1895
226	Cave Rock	Douglas		
227	Lake Mansion	Washoe	39.522562°N 119.8181126°W	
228	The Great Fire of 1875	Storey		
229	Oil from Shale	Elko		
230	Mount Rose Weather Observatory	Washoe		
231	Star City	Pershing		
232	Reunion in Unionville	Pershing		
233	Dayton Cemetery	Lyon		
234	Moana Springs	Washoe	Maps 39.4923328°N 119.800851°W	
235	Camp Nye	Carson City		
236	Piper's Opera House	Storey		
237	Carson and Colorado Railroad Freight Depot	Mineral		
238	Huffaker's	Washoe		
239	Stonehouse	Humboldt		
240	Coney Island	Washoe	Maps 39.535005°N 119.780611°W	
242	Southern Nevada Consolidated Telephone-Telegraph Company Building	Esmeralda		
243	Corbett—Fitzsimmons Fight	Carson City	39.164475°N 119.759997°W	
244	Dinner Station	Elko		
245	Frederick Joseph DeLongchamps (June 2, 1882 – February 11, 1969)	Washoe	39.524964°N 119.812281°W	
246	The Great Incline of the Sierra Nevada	Washoe	39.236813°N 119.928778°W	
247	Site of Nevada's First Public Library	Washoe	39.524964°N 119.812281°W	
248	Virginia & Truckee Railroad Right of Way	Washoe	39.5146446°N 119.8075372°W	
249	Union Pacific Depot—1923	Lincoln		
250	State Printing Building	Carson City		
251	Diamondfield Jack Davis	Elko		
252	Rinckel Mansion	Carson City		
253	Emigrant—Donner Camp	Washoe	39.476005°N 119.754087°W	
254	Nevada's Mining Heritage	Eureka		
255	Wilson Canyon	Lyon		
256	Historic Transportation	Washoe		
257	Nevada's First Gold Discovery	Lyon		
258	Charles W. Friend House, Observatory, and Weather Station	Carson City		
259	The Governor's Mansion	Carson City		
260	Contact	Elko		
261	Spooner Summit	Douglas		
262	Dayton School House - 1865	Lyon		
263	Oats Park School	Churchill		
265	Governor Emmet Derby Boyle	Washoe		
266	African Americans and the Boston Saloon	Storey	39.31061108944942°N 119.64838454520866°W	AFRICAN AMERICANS AND THE BOSTON SALOON: Between 1866 and 1875, a remarkable business thrived in Virginia City. Free-Born William A.G. Brown operated the Boston Saloon, serving Virginia City's African Americans. Archaeologists have revealed that Brown offered his customers finely prepared meals with the best cuts of meat. Shortly after Brown sold his business, the great fire of 1875 swept through town and destroyed the building. There were rarely more than one hundred African Americans living in Virginia City during its height in the 1860, but they played varied and important roles in the community. Some African Americans pursued work as laborers, porters, and barbers. Other became affluent business owners, and a prominent doctor won widespread respect. By the 1870's, African American children attended integrated schools. However, the decline of mining by 1880 sent many Nevadans, including African Americans, elsewhere. When mining in the state revived in the early 1900s, a shift at the federal, state, and local levels that implemented segregation via law or practice kept most African American families from returning to communities like Virginia City. The site of the Boston Saloon is located uphill and to the left of this location at the corner of Union and D Streets now occupied by the Bucket of Blood Saloon parking lot. STATE HISTORIC PRESERVATION OFFICE DON MCBRIDE AND THE PUCKET OF BLOOD ALOON RENO-SPARKS BRANCH OF THE NAACP, UNIT #1112 STATE HISOTRICAL MARKER N. 266
267	Galena Creek Fish Hatchery	Washoe		
269	Ely - Forging the Link	White Pine		
270	The Morelli House	Clark	36.165302°N 115.137757°W	
271	Pony Express Trail	Churchill		
272	Ioannis A. Lougaris VA Medical Center	Washoe	39.516289°N 119.800332°W	
274	Nevada State Hospital (Nevada)	Washoe		
