= Eureka Historic District =

Eureka Historic District may refer to:

- Eureka Historic District (Eureka, Nevada), listed on the NRHP in Nevada
- Eureka Historic District (Eureka, Utah), listed on the NRHP in Utah
- Eureka Springs Historic District, Eureka Springs, Arkansas, listed on the NRHP in Arkansas
- Old Town Eureka, formerly known as Eureka Historic District (Eureka, California), listed on the NRHP in California
