= Kyle Ranch =

- U.S. National Register of Historic Places
- Nevada Historical Marker
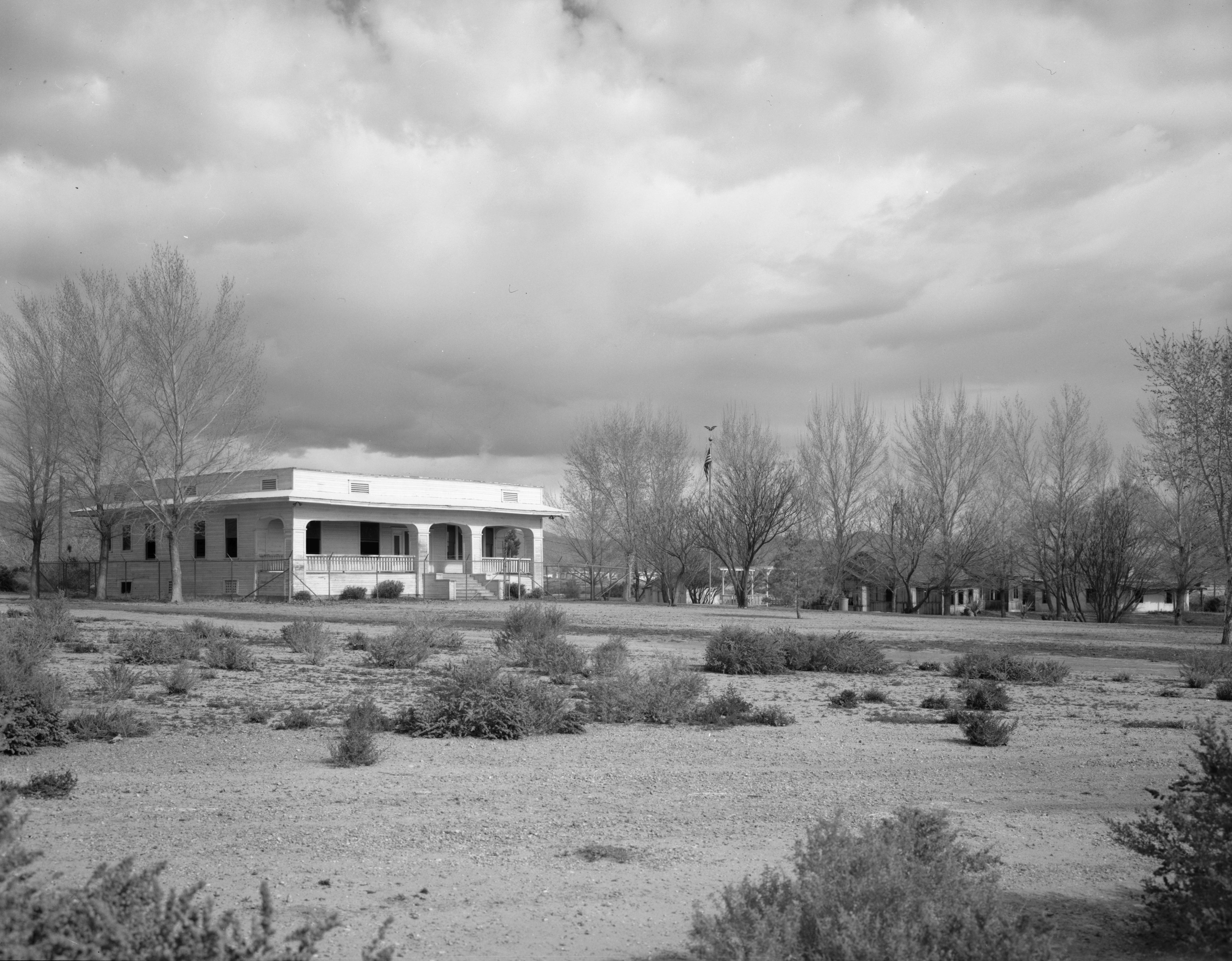
- Ranch house
- Location: Losee St. and Carey Ave. North Las Vegas, Nevada, USA
- Coordinates: 36°12′21″N 115°08′26″W
- Area: 26 acres (11 ha)
- Built: 1855
- Architect: John S. Park
- NRHP reference No.: 75001107
- USNV No.: 224
- Added to NRHP: October 6, 1975

Kyle Ranch or Kiel Ranch, (Note: The ranch's name is spelled alternately as "Kiel" and "Kyle" because Conrad Kiel, the ranch's founder, spelled his name both ways.) was one of the earliest non-Indigenous ranches settled in the Las Vegas Valley. Founded by Conrad Kiel in 1875, the location of the former ranch is in the city of North Las Vegas, where the city maintains the remnants of the site as the "Kiel Ranch Historic Park." The original adobe structure, one of the oldest buildings in Las Vegas, a wooden shed known as the "Doll House," and the cemetery are all that remain after loss of buildings through fire and neglect. Also within the park is an artesian well and a small wetlands, a reminder of what drew travelers and early settlers to the area (the spring provided water allowing the ranch to grow fruits and vegetables). The Nevada Department of Conservation designated the ranch with historical marker 224.

== History ==
In 1855, with the intention of creating a base of location for Mormon settlers, William Bringhurst and other Mormon missionaries started their foray into the Las Vegas Valley. Basic infrastructure was built in the months and years that followed, including a fort (extant portions of which are preserved at the Old Las Vegas Mormon Fort State Historic Park) and rudimentary irrigation trenches. Despite their efforts, however, by 1857, the Mormons who settled in the area left the valley due to various reasons, including a drought and the impending Utah War.

Nevertheless, the infrastructure that the Mormon missionaries built resulted in non-Mormon migrants moving the area, including Octavius Decatur Gass, who was one of Conrad Kiel’s friends. Gass established his ranch at the site of the Mormon fort, and ended up becoming a successful trader and rancher. Kiel eventually followed Gass and built a ranch not far from Gass' home in 1875. Kiel's land surrounded a natural spring and artesian well, and there he established a 240-acre homestead where he grew citrus trees, apples, and vegetables. The area Kiel settled is believed to be the spot where Mormon missionaries tried to settle Native Americans and teach them to farm; the adobe building at the site may date from the Mormon period.

In 1884, Archibald Stewart, an early pioneer in the area, was killed in a gunfight on the ranch. Stewart's wife, Helen J. Stewart, would go on to be an influential citizen of Las Vegas. Several years later, in 1900, Ed Kiel and William Kiel, then owners of the ranch, were found shot to death in what was believed (at the time) to be a murder-suicide. The bodies were exhumed in the mid-1970s, and it was determined that they had both been murdered.

Part of the ranch was sold in 1903 to William A. Clark to build the line for the San Pedro, Los Angeles and Salt Lake Railroad.

In 1911, Las Vegas banker John S. Park purchased the ranch and built a mansion known as the White House. Subsequent owners included Edwin Taylor (1924–39), whose cowboy ranch hands competed in national rodeos, and Edwin and Bette Losee (1939–58), who developed the Boulderado Guest Ranch here, a popular residence for divorce seekers during Nevada's heyday as a place to reside while waiting to get an easy divorce under the state's liberal laws.

=== Site preservation ===
A 26-acre (11 ha) portion of the original ranch site was listed on the National Register of Historic Places in 1975. At the time, it included five contributing buildings.

In the 1974, North Las Vegas chose the ranch as its restoration project for the city's bicentennial and sold 26 acres (11 ha) to the North Las Vegas Bicentennial Committee, which was given $27,000 to renovate the site. The project was not completed—although a hundred-year time capsule and some renovations were finished—and the committee dissolved with the remaining funds redirected to other city projects in 1976.

The Advisory Board for Kiel Ranch took over the previous committee's responsibilities and would work towards the site's renovation from 1978 to 1995. In 1988, acres were sold by the city and in 1992, a fire destroyed the main building.

Beginning in 2015, the city spent $2 million of state grant money over 14 months to restore the site. Two structures, the adobe structure and the "doll house" were restored and several grass lawns, picnic tables, gazebos, and walking trails were installed throughout the ranch.

Today, the city owns 7 acres (2.8 ha) of the original ranch which is managed by the city's parks and recreation department.

=== Cemetery ===
The ranch included a cemetery, which was formerly located at the corner of Carey Avenue and Commerce Street; this part of the ranch was not sold to the city in the 1970s. In 1975, anthropologists at the University of Nevada, Las Vegas (UNLV) exhumed the bodies from the cemetery. This had been done at the request of the city, as it desired to move the remains onto the city-owned property and properly mark the graves with headstones. Five bodies in total were removed and taken to UNLV to be studied. There they remained for nearly 45 years, until they were reburied in the historic park during December 2019. Initially delayed by the COVID-19 pandemic, a ceremony to dedicate the graves was held on Veterans Day, November 11, 2022.
