= Las Vegas Mission =

Early LDS Church settlement in Las Vegas Valley

The Las Vegas Mission was one of the earliest European settlements in the Las Vegas Valley. It was established by missionaries for the Church of Jesus Christ of Latter-day Saints (LDS Church). In May 1855, at the direction of then church president Brigham Young, thirty-two missionaries were sent to evangelize among Native Americans and establish a mission outpost in the Las Vegas Valley. The mission was abandoned in December 1857 due to growing political issues revolving Mormons and the threat of Native American attacks.

== Origin ==
Between the years 1847 and 1869, over 60,000 Mormons came and settled in the Salt Lake Valley. With the influx of population came many settlements throughout Utah making Brigham Young more inclined to expand the church's geographical area outside of the Salt Lake Valley. Young directed many members of the church to settle in areas surrounding Utah, such as the Cache Valley, Arizona, Colorado, and New Mexico.

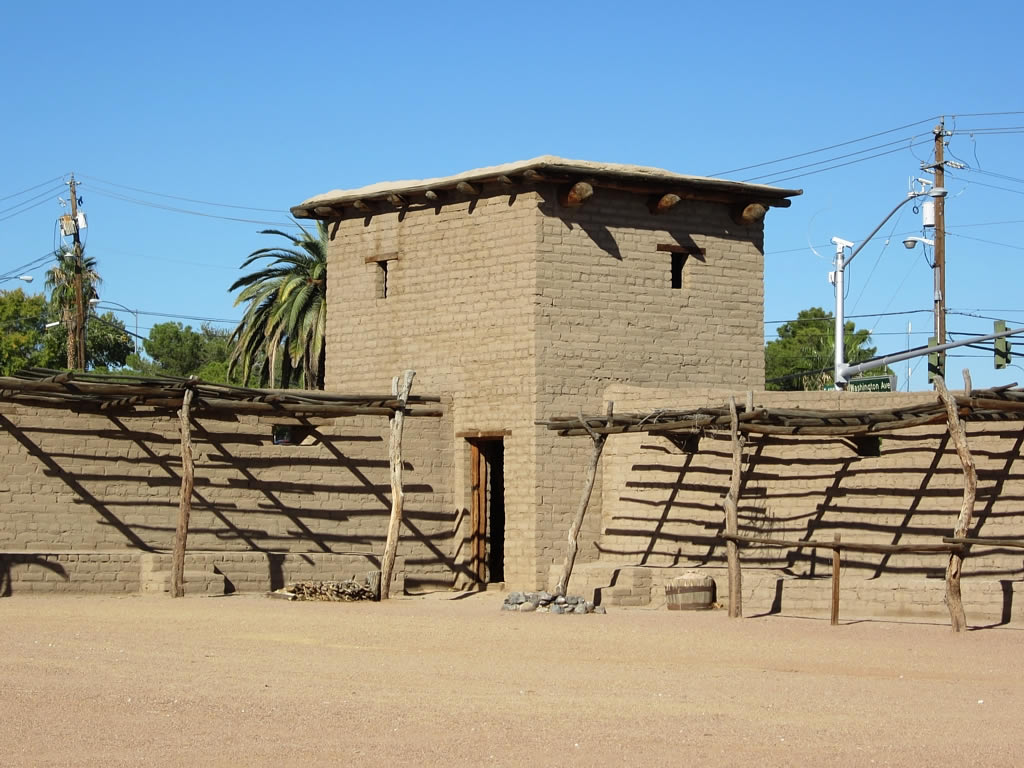
The Las Vegas Mormon Fort is still standing today and is open to visitors.

Mormons hoped that their expansion would result in both a larger geographical area for the church as well as providing new missionary opportunities. Missionary opportunities came with an increase of interaction with Native Americans. Some of the initial interactions resulted in Mormons being able to gain influence among different Native American groups and this gained influence opened up greater missionary efforts among Native Americans. Mormons had a unique perspective toward evangelizing among Native Americans. Their belief was that Native Americans came from Israelite descent who at one point migrated to America around 600 BCE, but fell into transgression which caused them to lose favor in the sight of God. Mormons saw Native Americans as people who had gone astray and believed it to be their duty to reintroduce them to the faith they had lost over many centuries. For this reason many Mormon mission outposts were established in the west.

The Las Vegas Valley was one of the areas chosen to establish a mission based on its geographical location as a midway point between Cedar City, Utah and San Bernardino, California. The exact site selected was the Las Vegas springs because its small stream created the only oasis for miles. Shortly after settling in May 1855, construction of the Las Vegas Mormon Fort and houses surrounding it began to take place.

== Prominent missionaries ==
The original expedition in 1855 was by 32 missionaries and in April 1856 Brigham Young dispatched additional missionaries. Many of these missionaries had previously served missions and had held positions of prominence in the church.

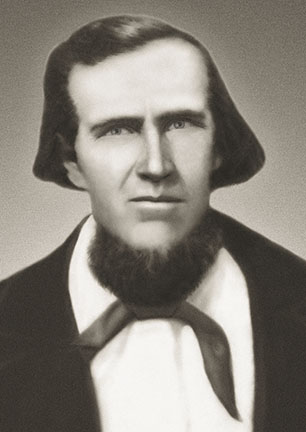
Jacob Hamblin was called on many missions for the church of Jesus Christ of Latter-day Saints and was known in the church as the "Apostle to the Lamanites".

=== William Bringhurst ===
William Bringhurst was appointed by Brigham Young to be the President of the Las Vegas Mission. Bringhurst traveled to Utah as a member of the John Taylor company in 1847. Upon arriving in the mission in 1855, Bringhurst dedicated himself fully to ensure the mission's success.

In 1856, Nathaniel V. Jones was sent by Brigham Young to the mission to claim some of the missionaries to work in mines for the purpose of smelting ore. Bringhurst refused to allow Jones to take his missionaries and upon later return Jones informed Bringhurst that Brigham Young had denounced Bringhurst's status as president of the Las Vegas Mission and his membership in the church.

Bringhurst later regained good-standing with the church and was appointed by Brigham Young as one of the founding trustees of Brigham Young Academy (now Brigham Young University).

=== Jacob Hamblin ===
Jacob Hamblin was called to the Southern Indian Mission in 1853 and was given the title of “Apostle to the Lamanites” by Brigham Young. Hamblin was instrumental in the establishment of many missions for the church that reached areas in Utah, California, Arizona, and Nevada (including the Las Vegas Mission).

Despite the fact that all the missions that Hamblin helped establish would later fall, Hamblin still was a successful missionary among Native Americans. Part of the reason Mormons were able to gain good relations with Native Americans was because of missionaries like Hamblin who was known as a “friend to the Indians”. Even after the church halted its efforts of evangelizing to Native Americans after the collapse of their many missions, Hamblin still traveled with the Indian frontier so that he could keep teaching the Natives.

=== George Washington Bean ===
George Washington Bean was baptized into LDS Church in 1841 at the age of 10. Four years after that, at the age of 14, he was called to serve as a member of the Quorum of the Seventy for the church, a position usually bestowed upon men much older than Bean. This position involved an increase of responsibility that included church assignments such as evangelizing. His calling as a seventy alongside his ability to speak different Native American dialects led to him being one of the 32 missionaries called to settle the Las Vegas Mission in 1855.

Bean served many different functions on the mission including being the mission's clerk and serving as a teacher of the Native American languages. However, like many of the other original missionaries, Bean became discomforted by the introduction of ore miners sent by Brigham Young. In September 1856, at the direction of William Bringhurst, Bean and a group of missionaries returned to Salt Lake City to counsel with Young. Their trip proved to be in vain as no changes were made and the mission was abandoned shortly afterwards.

After returning to Provo, Utah after leaving the mission, Bean would hold many positions in the community and church. Bean would serve as a legislator and judge in the community as well as a patriarch and member of an LDS stake presidency.

== Life on the mission ==
Colonists, sent by Brigham Young and led by William Bringhurst, arrived at the Las Vegas Mission site in June 1855 . The missionaries held the following primary objectives:

1. Developing the site's agricultural potential
2. Working with and teaching the Native Americans about Jesus Christ
3. Serving as a station linking Mormon settlements between southern Utah and southern California
4. Protecting and keeping open the trails which allowed year-round travel and trade

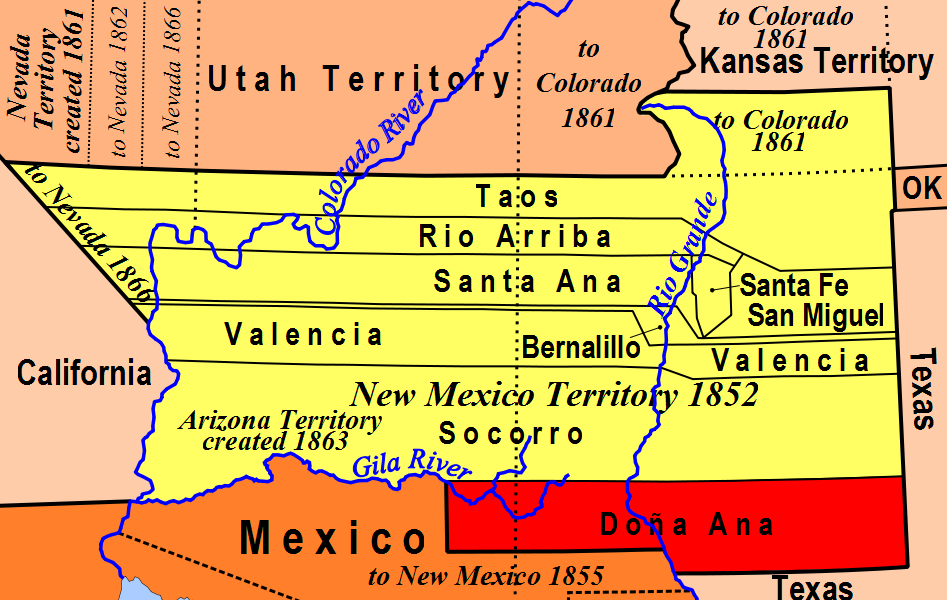
Map of Pah-Ute county in 1852

With its initial primary objective to develop agriculture and harvest before winter, immediate excavation began to build an irrigation ditch that diverted water from the Las Vegas Creek to the southeast corner of the fort. Further irrigation ditches were dug to provide water to five-acre farm plots (2.5 acres per person). Most of the days were then spent working the fields. Once the crops were growing well in mid-July, the attention was shifted to the public works of the settlement and different projects were started. Bringhurst and a small company of men searched the mountains for timber for building improvements and adobe brick was made and used to build a corral and to build the fort walls. Late in 1855 the mission obtained horses from California and cattle and mules from Salt Lake City to aid in their labors.

When the year 1856 began, the Las Vegas Mission appeared to be making great strides toward permanency. On January 10, the mission received documents which allowed the establishment of an official post office. In late May, three missionaries received permission to bring their families from Salt Lake City to live in the fort. Missionary John Steele reported in April that the lead deposit found in the Potosi mine was large and easily accessible, and a sample of ore was sent to Brigham Young in Salt Lake City. Soon after more missionaries were sent from Salt Lake City by Brigham Young with the focus of extracting the lead ore.

== Abandonment ==
Struggles with the elements and constant thievery by the Native Americans made it difficult for the mission to last long. The missionaries, however, had more than their own struggles to worry about. Prior to the Mormon exodus from Nauvoo to the Salt Lake Valley, Mormons faced severe conflicts with local and state governments regarding certain religious practices such as polygamy. After arriving in Salt Lake City, tension continued to rise between the US Government and the Mormons and a federal army was dispatched toward Utah on suspicion of rebellion. As a result, Brigham Young recalled all settlers from Carson Valley, San Bernardino, and Las Vegas in order to better concentrate his people and defenses. Within weeks the settlements were abandoned.

Other sources attribute social and political conflicts between those committed to the mission's original and its subsequent objectives to the fort's total abandonment. The mission's original objective was to develop the site's agricultural potential, while later more missionaries were sent by Brigham Young to mine and smelt lead ore discovered in the Potosi mountains. The conflict over where to focus the man-power lead to some missionaries leaving the mission and returning to Salt Lake City.

With their return to the Salt Lake Valley, the missionaries left behind the still-standing fort, as well as the Potosi mine and all it contained. The missionaries had extracted sixty tons of lead ore from the mine, leaving piles of silver slag. The extracted lead had been shipped to Salt Lake City to be used as needed.
