= Osceola Ditch =

- Osceola (East) Ditch
- U.S. National Register of Historic Places
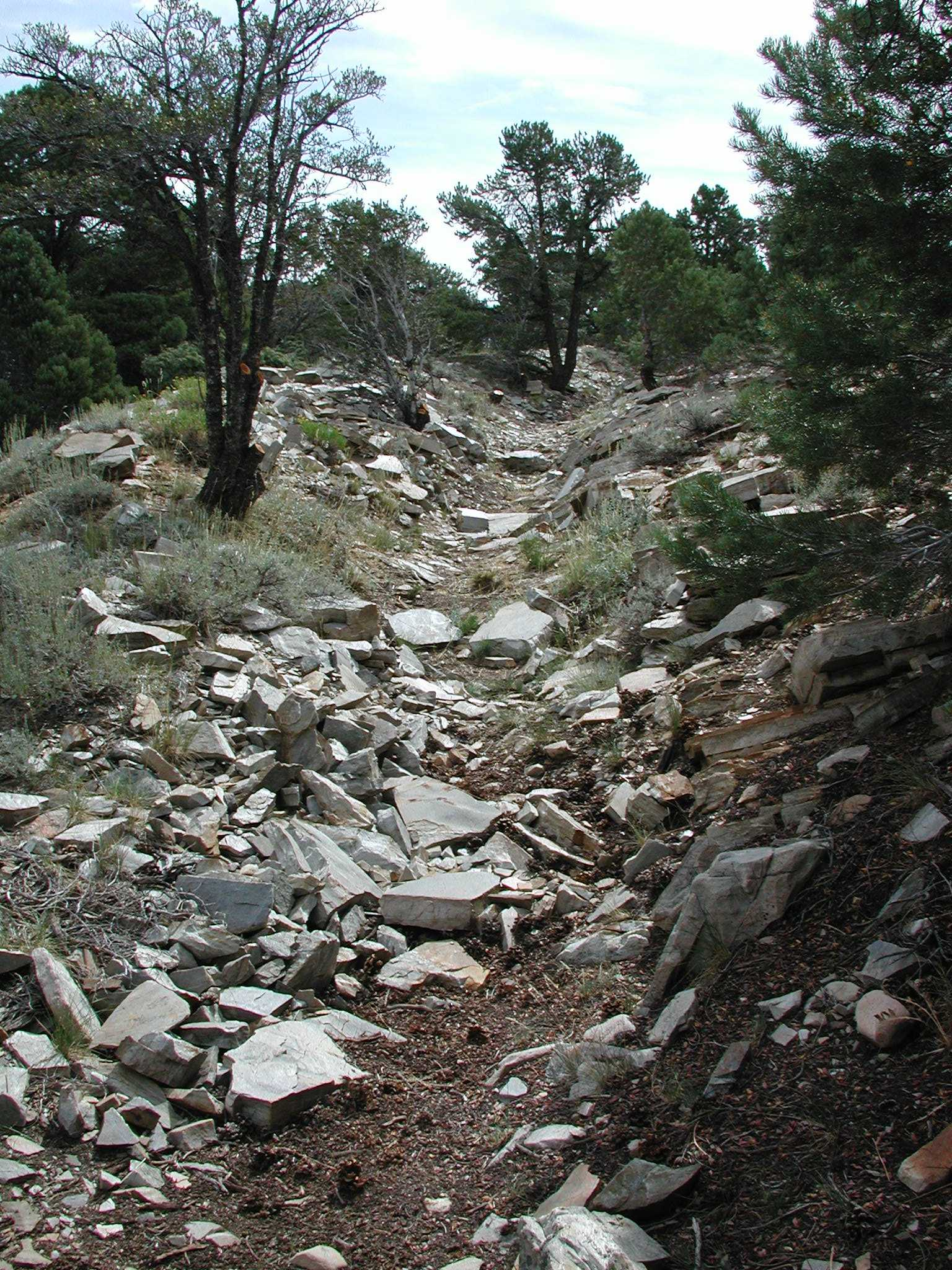
- Osceola Ditch

- Location within Nevada Location within the United States
- Location: White Pine County, Nevada
- Nearest city: Baker, Nevada
- Coordinates: 39°1′48″N 114°17′26″W
- Built: 1890
- NRHP reference No.: 96000584
- Added to NRHP: June 06, 1996

The Osceola Ditch, also known as the East Ditch, was built in 1889–1890 to convey water from Lehman Creek, Nevada to a hydraulic mine operation at Osceola. Extending for 18 mi (29 km), the ditch includes a 600 ft (180 m) tunnel as well as wooden flumes. The project also includes a rock dam and headgate on Stella Lake. The ditch's terminus at Osceola, Nevada became disused during the early 1900s and was destroyed entirely by a fire in the 1940s. Much of the East Ditch is included within Great Basin National Park.

== Osceola Mine ==
Gold was first discovered by James Matteson and Frank Heck in 1872 in what would become the Osceola mining district, 3 mi (4.8 km) to the west of what would become Great Basin National Park. Placer gold was discovered by John Versan in 1877. The town of Osceola grew to 1500 residents, extracting almost $2 million in gold, including a 24 lb (11 kg) nugget. Gold was found in nearby Dry Gulch, but its extraction would require large scale engineering. The Osceola Gravel Mining Company formed to exploit the deposit using hydraulic mining techniques, constructing the West Ditch in 1884-1885. The water proved to be inadequate for the purpose, so the East Ditch was surveyed in 1885. Water rights were purchased from Absalom Lehman, discoverer of Lehman Caves.

== The ditches ==
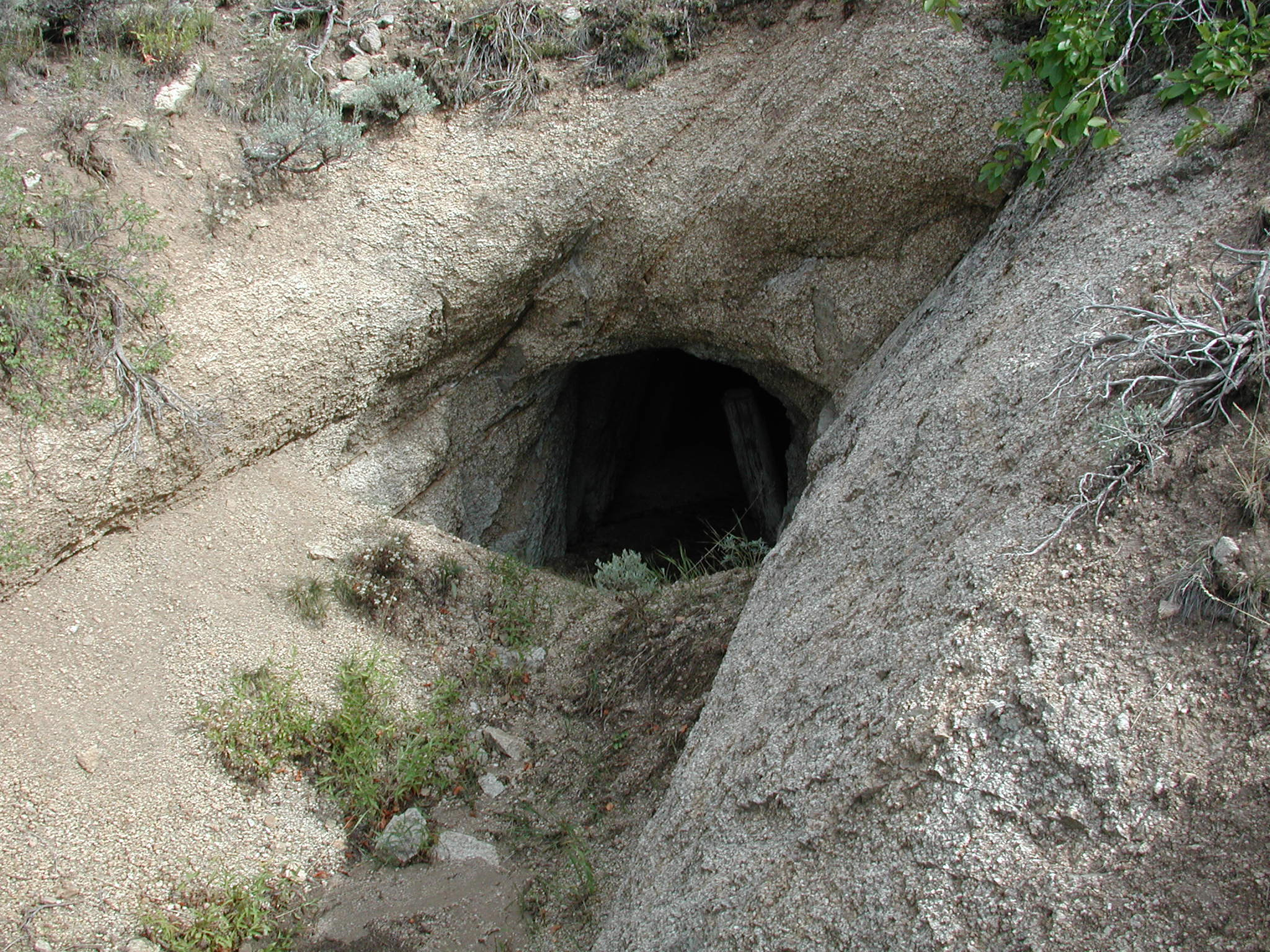
Osceola Ditch tunnel

The project was built to serve the Osceola Gravel Mining Company's placer gold mine, which required enormous quantities of water to blast apart gold-bearing gravel and rubble deposits, and was capable of delivering 2500 miner's inches of water. A companion project, the West Ditch could provide 1100 miner's inches. The East ditch was built at a cost of $108,222.65, with a width of 4 feet (1.2 m) at the bottom, 2.5 ft (0.76 m) in width with a uniform grade of 14 ft (4.3 m) per mile (1.6 km). The ditch could carry 40,000,000 US gal (150,000,000 L; 33,000,000 imp gal) per day. The East Ditch included 14 sections of wood flume, including 3,768 ft (1,148 m) in Lehman Canyon. Flumes were 4 ft (1.2 m) wide and 4 ft (1.2 m) deep, with a uniform grade of 32 ft (9.8 m) per mile (1.6 km).

Accessory structures included four ditch keepers' houses. Extensive improvements were made to the mining area, including expansion of the receiving reservoir, new sluices, and two 8 in (200 mm) hydraulic monitors. Despite all of these measures, there was never enough water available for the mining operation to reach its full potential. Operations had to be curtailed in 1894 and again in 1896. After eleven years, the Osceola Mine shut down for good. An abortive 1906 plan to organize a new company, the Nevada Amalgamated Mines and Power Company, with plans for reduction works, a power plant, three towns and a railroad spur, never reached fruition.

The West Ditch predated the East Ditch, extending 16 mi (26 km) to the west side of the Snake Range. It is not included in the historic district designation. Little remains of the West Ditch. The East Ditch was listed on the National Register of Historic Places in 1996. The East Ditch no longer carries water and is overgrown, but sections of flume remain. The tunnel at Strawberry Creek has partially collapsed. Little remains of Osceola itself.
