= Arthur Raycraft House =

Historic house in Nevada, United States

- U.S. National Register of Historic Places
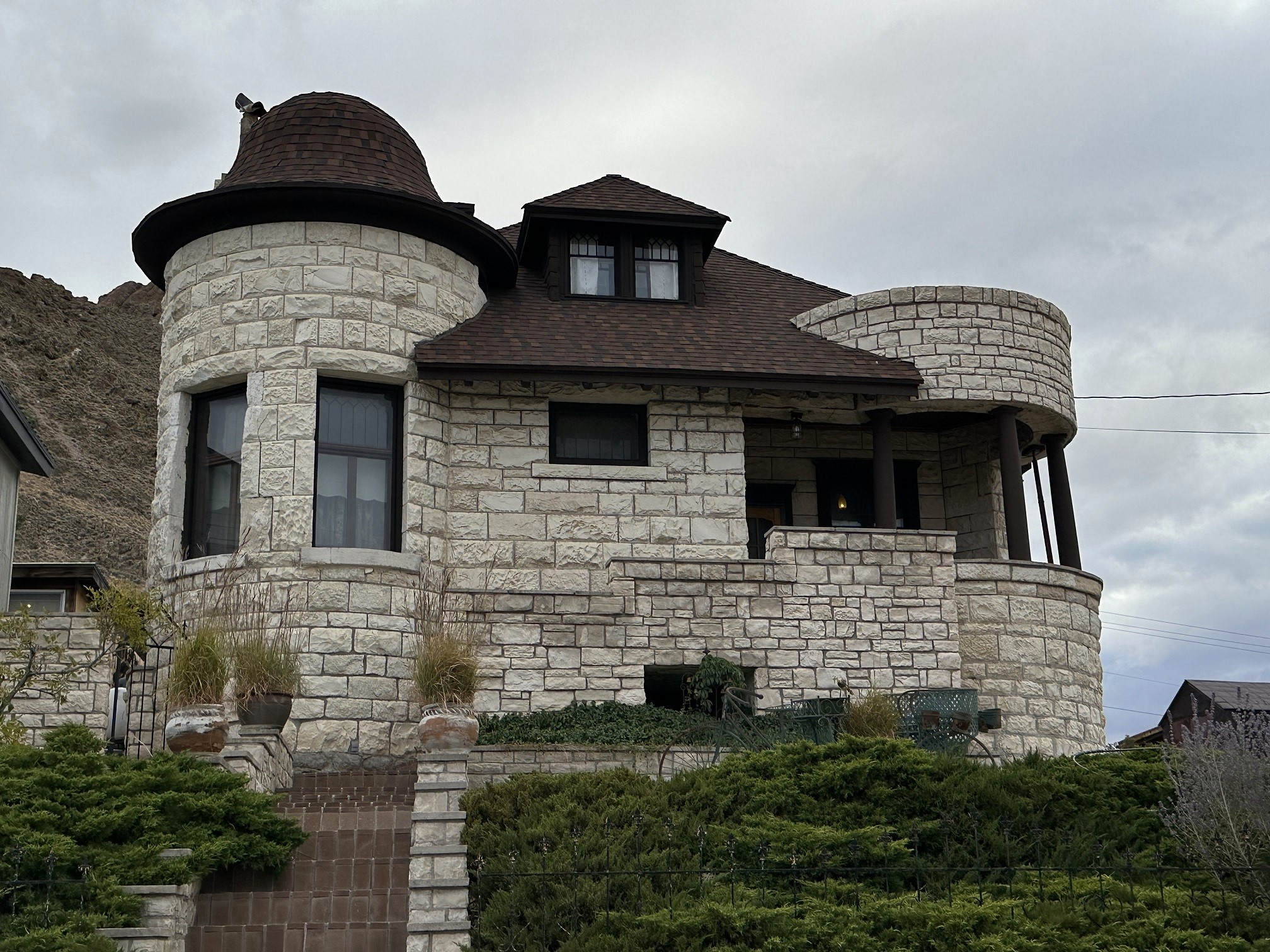

- Location within Nevada Location within the United States
- Location: 123 Stewart Street, Tonopah, Nevada
- Coordinates: 38.06741°N 117.23626°W
- Area: less than one acre
- Built: 1906
- Architectural style: Queen Anne, Neo-Colonial
- MPS: Tonopah MRA
- NRHP reference No.: 82003240
- Added to NRHP: May 20, 1982

The Arthur Raycraft House, on Booker St. in Tonopah, Nevada, United States, is a historic stone house that was built in 1906. It was listed on the National Register of Historic Places in 1982. It was deemed significant for its association with banker and businessman Arthur G. Raycraft, and for its substantial architecture.

== See also ==
- Raycraft Ranch, also NRHP-listed in Nevada
