= Charles Bigelow (racing driver) =

American racing driver (1872–1958)

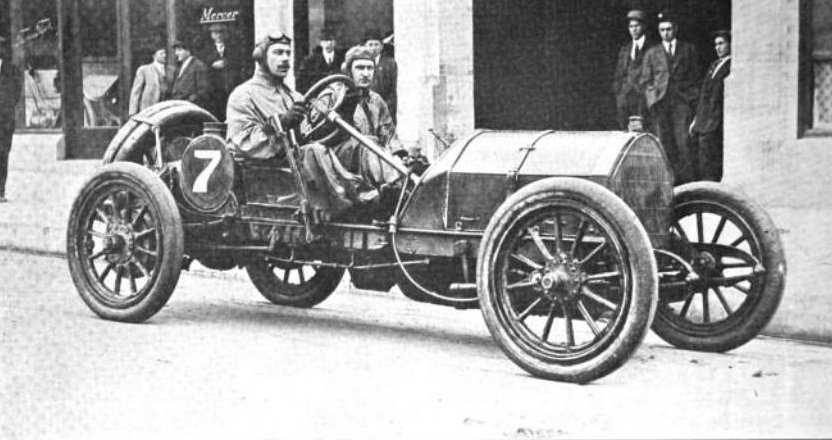
- Bigelow and his mechanic in their Mercer, circa 1911
- Born: Charles Henry Bigelow; August 26, 1872 Kilbourne, Illinois, U.S.
- Died: June 8, 1958 (aged 85) Los Angeles, California, U.S.

Champ Car career
- 4 races run over 1 year
- First race: 1911 Oakland Trophy (Portola)
- Last race: 1911 Jepsen Trophy (Santa Monica)
- First win: 1911 Oakland Trophy (Portola)
Wins	Podiums	Poles
1	1	0

Charles Henry Bigelow (August 26, 1872 – June 8, 1958) was an American racing driver. Bigelow drove in the inaugural Indianapolis 500 in 1911.

== Personal life ==
Bigelow was born on August 26, 1872, in Kilbourne, Illinois. His parents were Edwin (Edward) H Bigelow and Sarah A. Marshall.

Bigelow married Harriet Estelle Ingraham on Mar 25, 1903.

Bigelow also named the Arrowhead Trail, the first road built between 1910 and 1913 between Los Angeles and Salt Lake. Bigelow traveled the route in his twin-six Packard (nicknamed "Cactus Kate") to publicize the road.

Bigelow died on June 8, 1958, in Los Angeles. He is buried in the St. George City Cemetery.

== Motorsports career results ==
=== Indianapolis 500 results ===
Year	Car	Start	Qual	Rank	Finish	Laps	Led	Retired
1911	37	33	—	—	15	126	0	Flagged
Totals						126	0	

Starts	1
Poles	0
Front Row	0
Wins	0
Top 5	0
Top 10	0
Retired	0
