= Arrowhead Trail (auto trail) =

Former auto trail in California, Nevada, and Utah in the Western United States

Arrowhead Trail

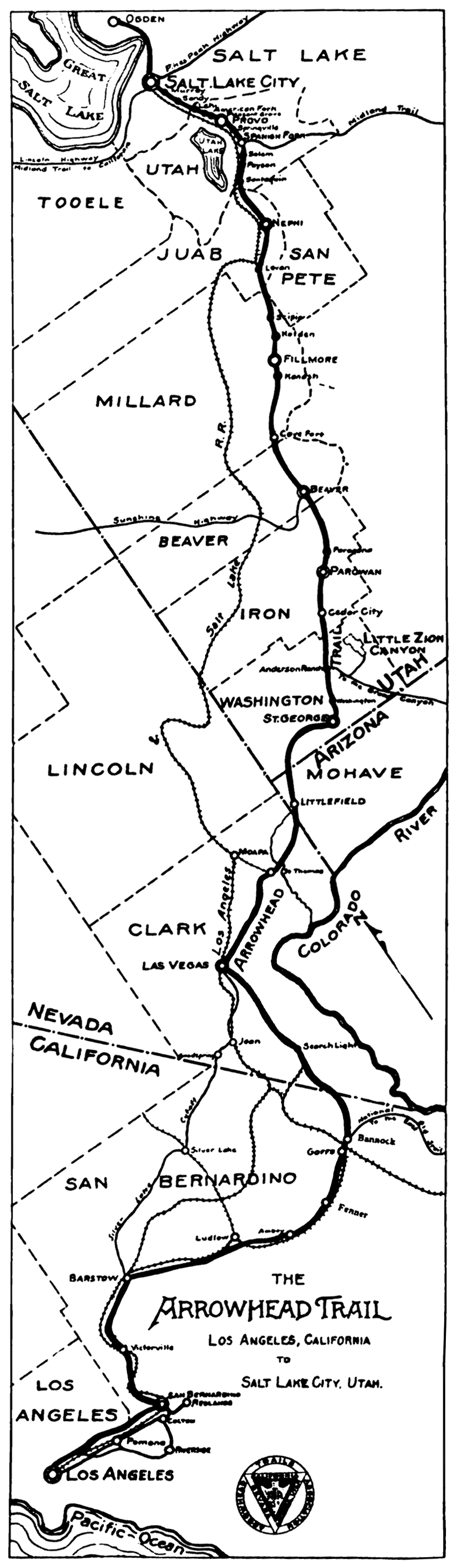

Route information
- Length: 853.4 mi (1,373.4 km) Length of the original route along the National Old Trails Road and north through Searchlight, Nevada.
- History: Arrowhead Trails Association formed in 1916, and incorporated in California on December 7, 1916.

Major junctions
- North end: Salt Lake City, Utah
- South end: Los Angeles, California

Location
- Country: United States
- States: Utah, Arizona, Nevada, California

Highway system
- Auto trails

Nevada Historical Marker
- Official name: Arrowhead Trail (1914-1924)
- Reference no.: 168

Nevada Historical Marker
- Official name: Arrowhead Trail - Henderson
- Reference no.: 197

The Arrowhead Trail or Arrowhead Highway was the first all-weather road in the Western United States that connected Los Angeles, California with Salt Lake City, Utah by way of Las Vegas, Nevada. Built primarily during the auto trails period of the 1910s, prior to the establishment of the United States Numbered Highway System, the road was replaced in 1926 by U.S. Route 91 (US 91) and subsequently Interstate 15 (I-15). Small portions of the route in California, Nevada, and Utah are sometimes still referred to by the name, or as Arrow Highway.

== History ==
Starting in 1915, auto racing champion Charles H. Bigelow drove the entire route many times to generate publicity for the road.

The Arrowhead Trail initially took a longer route via present U.S. Route 95 and former U.S. Route 66 between Las Vegas and Needles, California, as the more direct Old Spanish Trail was in very poor condition. The "Silver Lake cutoff", which would save about 90 miles (145 km), was proposed by 1920, and completed in 1925 as an oiled road by San Bernardino County.

Both the U.S. Bureau of Public Roads and the State of Nevada urged the inclusion of the cutoff route into each state's highway systems, the former as part of the federal aid highway connecting Salt Lake City and Los Angeles, and the California State Legislature did that in 1925, with it becoming an extension of Route 31. (Across the state line in Nevada, State Route 6 continued through Las Vegas to Arizona.) The initial plan for the U.S. Highway system simply stated that Route No. 91 would run from Las Vegas "to an intersection with Route No. 60" (which became US 66 in 1926), but in 1926 the cutoff was chosen, ending at US 66 at Daggett, just east of Barstow.

The original routing south from Las Vegas to Needles later became part of US 95 in 1940. The new "cutoff route" was added to the federal-aid secondary system in 1926, which helped pay for a mid-1930s widening and paving, including some realignments (parts of the old road are now known as Arrowhead Trail). The new routing generally followed the present I-15, except through Baker (where it used Baker Boulevard) and into Barstow (where it followed former SR 58 to First Avenue, ending at Main Street, which carried US 66). It entered San Bernardino on Cajon Boulevard, then followed the route of Arrow Highway between San Bernardino and Los Angeles. This route is still called Arrow Route or Arrow Highway through parts of Rancho Cucamonga, Upland, Montclair and Claremont as well as other cities between Irwindale and San Bernardino.

The Clark County, Nevada sections of the trail are marked by Nevada Historical Markers 168 and 197.

A monument to the Arrowhead Trail lies across from the north end of the Terrible's Hotel & Casino [formerly the Gold Strike Hotel and Gambling Hall] property's entrance in Jean, Nevada. It is from here that Las Vegas Boulevard begins and proceeds north to the Las Vegas Strip.

== Gallery ==
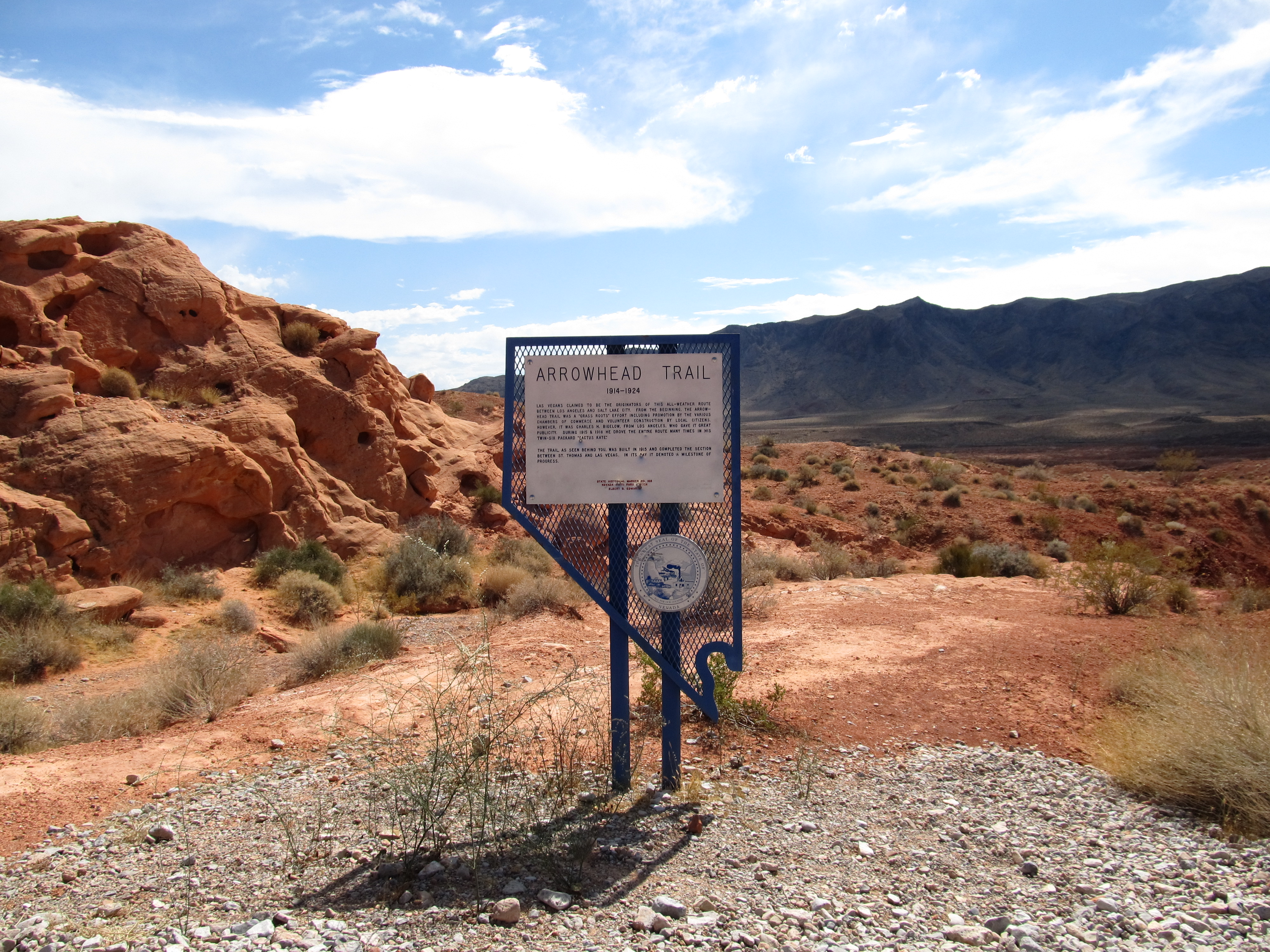
Arrowhead Trail (1914-1924), Nevada Historical Marker No. 168, in Valley of Fire State Park, Nevada

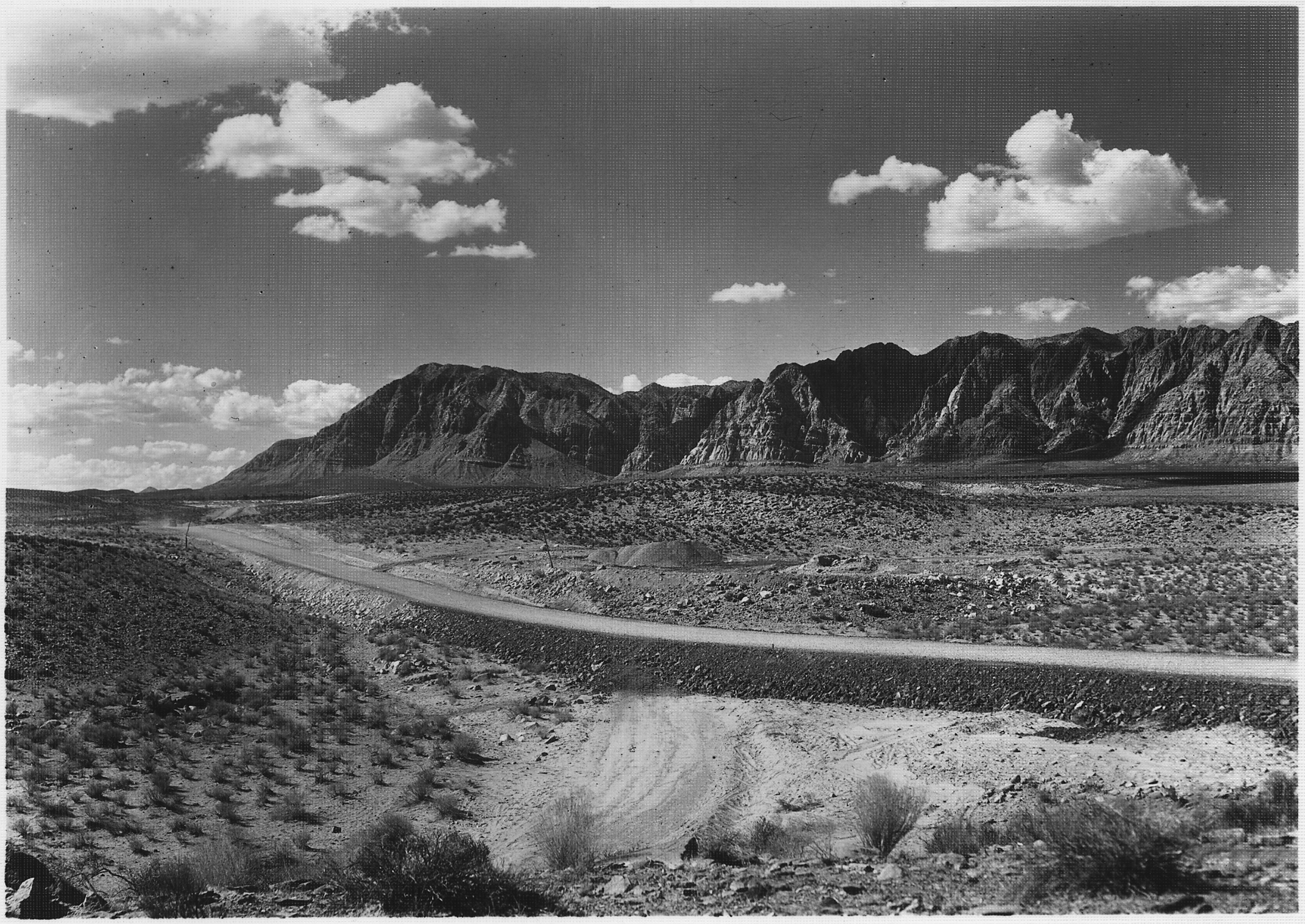
A 1929 photo of the Arrowhead Trail, now Old Hwy 91, about 5 miles (8.0 km) west of Santa Clara, Utah.
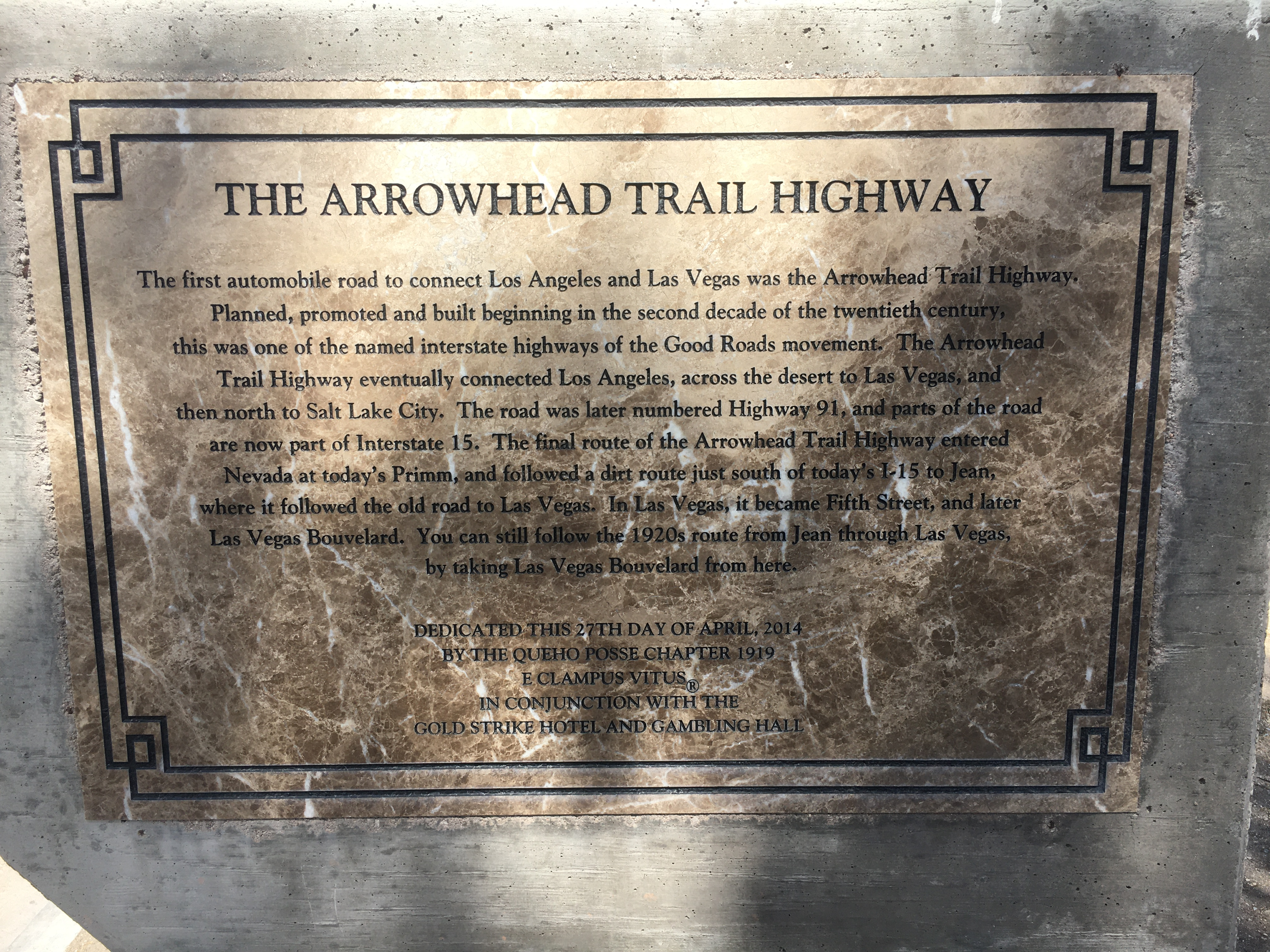
Arrowhead Trail Highway Marker in Jean, Nevada.

== Current route names ==
- California State Route 91
- Interstate 15
- Nevada State Route 169
- Las Vegas Boulevard

== See also ==
- List of auto trails
