= Osceola, Nevada =

- Ghost town
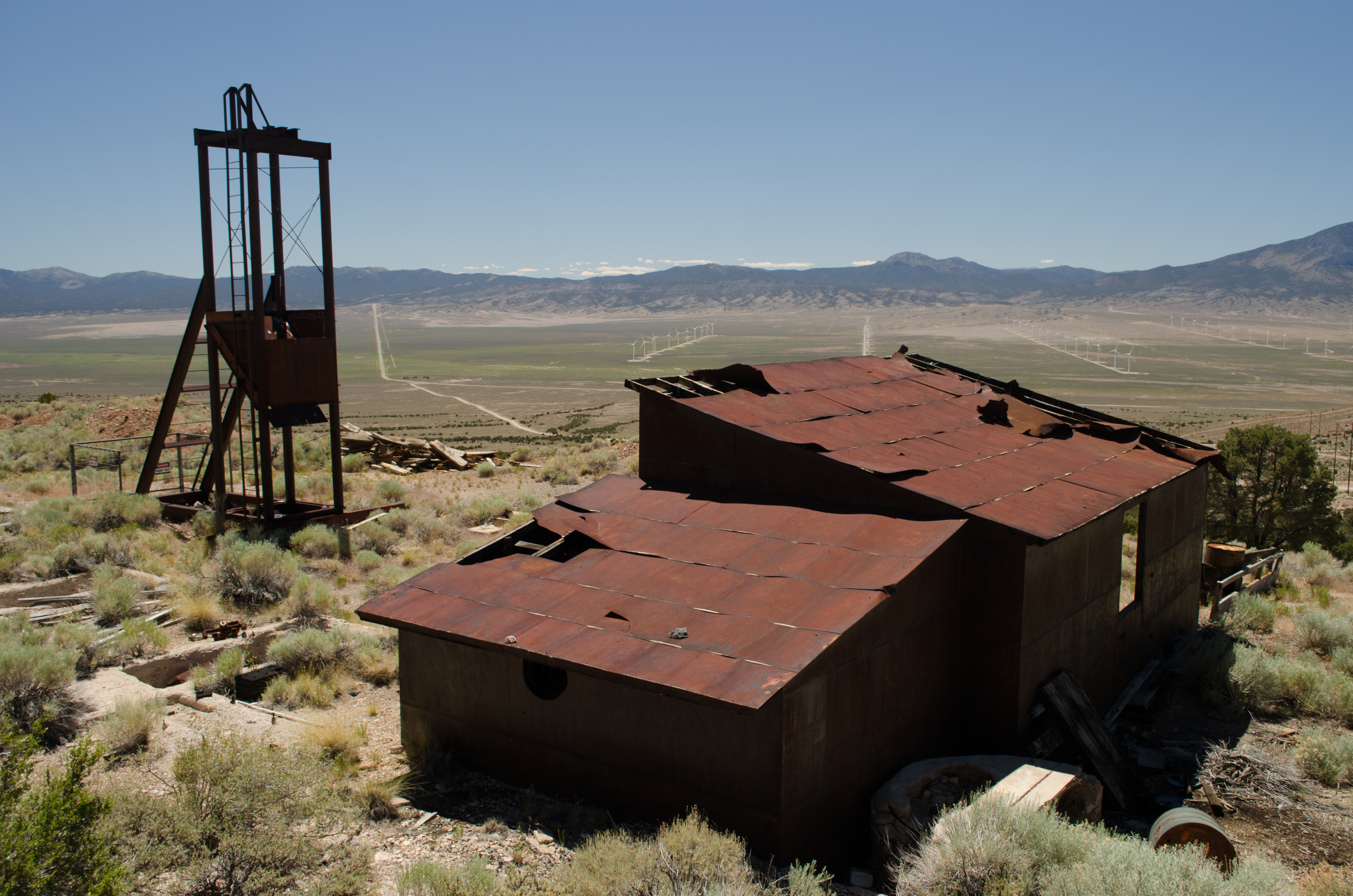
- Abandoned structures in Osceola

- Location within the state of Nevada Osceola (the United States)
- Coordinates: 39°05′26″N 114°23′08″W
- Country: United States
- State: Nevada
- County: White Pine
- Time zone: UTC-8 (Pacific (PST))
  - Summer (DST): UTC-7 (PDT)

Nevada Historical Marker
- Reference no.: 98

Osceola is a ghost town in the eastern part of the U.S. state of Nevada. The town was a placer camp devoted to mining gold. Gold was first discovered in 1872, followed by exploitation of the deposits using hydraulic mining techniques. Two ditches, the Osceola West Ditch and the Osceola East Ditch were built to convey water from the mountains for use in mining. Water production was less than hoped and hydraulic mining ceased in 1900, when the population had declined from 1500 at its peak to 100. A fire in the 1940s destroyed much of the town, but a few buildings and a cemetery remain.

The town is just to the west of Great Basin National Park. Some small-scale mining activities continue.
