= Sheridan, Nevada =

Unincorporated community in Nevada, US

- Unincorporated community
- Location within Nevada
- Coordinates: 38°53′53″N 119°49′22″W
- Country: United States
- State: Nevada
- County: Douglas
- Elevation: 4,813 ft (1,467 m)
- Time zone: UTC-8 (Pacific (PST))
  - Summer (DST): UTC-7 (PDT)
- Area code: 775
- GNIS feature ID: 861355

Nevada Historical Marker
- Reference no.: 122

Sheridan is an unincorporated community in Douglas County, Nevada, United States. Sheridan is located on Nevada State Route 206 5 miles (8.0 km) southwest of Minden.

== History ==
The community was founded by Moses Job in the 1850s.

In 1861, there was a blacksmith shop, a store, a boarding house, and two saloons in the community.
