= Schellbourne, Nevada =

Unincorporated community in Nevada, US

- Fort Schellbourne
- U.S. National Register of Historic Places
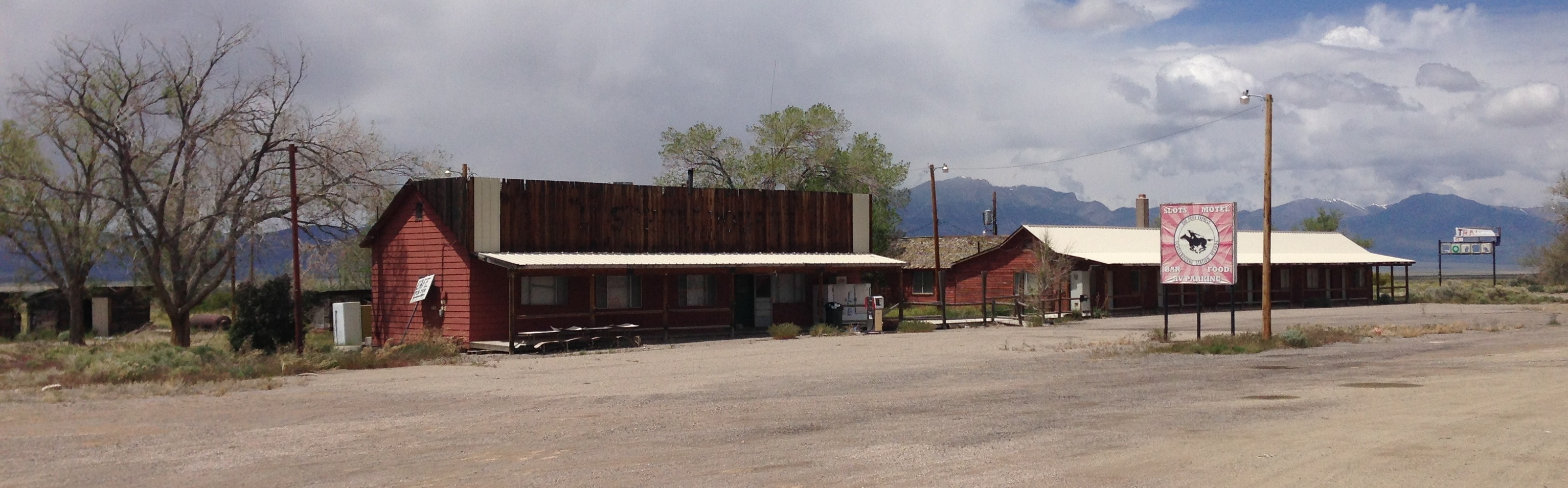
- Remaining buildings

- Location within Nevada Location within the United States
- Location: White Pine County, Nevada
- Nearest city: Ely, Nevada
- Coordinates: 39°47′50″N 114°40′50″W
- Area: 320 acres (130 ha)
- Built: 1860
- NRHP reference No.: 72000768

Nevada Historical Marker
- Reference no.: 51
- Added to NRHP: February 23, 1972

Schellbourne, formerly known as Fort Schellbourne and Schell Creek Station is a ghost town located in the Schell Creek Range in White Pine County in Nevada, United States, located 43 miles (69 km) north of Ely. The town was a stopover along the Central Overland Route, Pony Express and original routing of the Lincoln Highway. It is today Nevada Historical Marker number 51. The site was listed on the National Register of Historic Places in 1972. Its boundaries were increased in 1977.

== History ==
Schellbourne is named for Major A. J. Schell, who was in charge of troops responsible for protecting the Butterfield Overland Mail. The location was once a Shoshone Indian village. It became an Overland Stage and Mail stop in 1859, and a Pony Express station in 1860 as Schell Creek station. The Overland Telegraph came through in 1861. It was briefly known as Fort Schellbourne in 1862 when troops camped here to counter Indian harassment of the stages and mails.

In the 1870s, Schellbourne became a mining town, with about 500 inhabitants. The Schellbourne post office was in operation from December 1871 until October 1925.

It declined after the Central Pacific Railroad was completed in 1869, to the north. Then it revived as a mining camp in 1871 after gold discoveries nearby.

Nowadays it is well preserved ghost town on a private ranch. It is listed as Nevada Historical Marker 51.

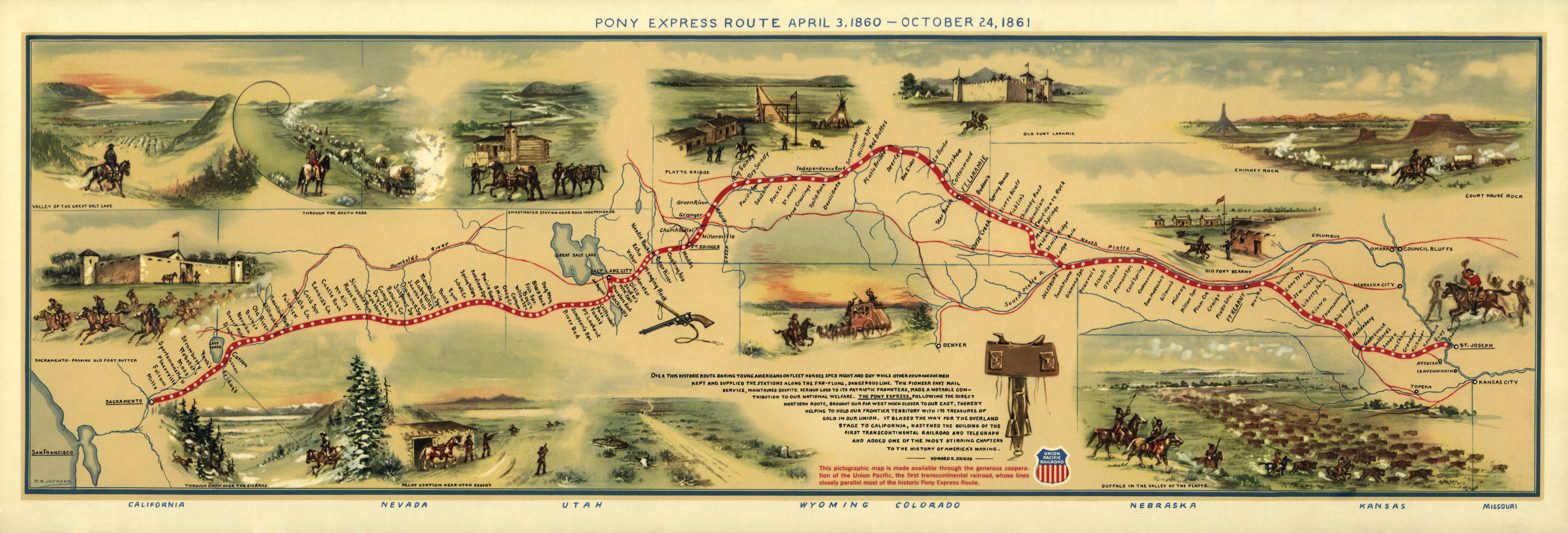
Illustrated Map of Pony Express Route in 1860 by William Henry Jackson ~ Courtesy the Library of Congress ~ The Pony Express mail route, April 3, 1860 – October 24, 1861; Reproduction of Jackson illustration issued to commemorate the 100th anniversary of Pony Express founding on April 3, 1960. Reproduction of Jackson's map issued by the Union Pacific Railroad Company. Schell Cr. is now known as Schellbourne.
