= Huffaker Hills =

Volcanic hills in Reno, Nevada

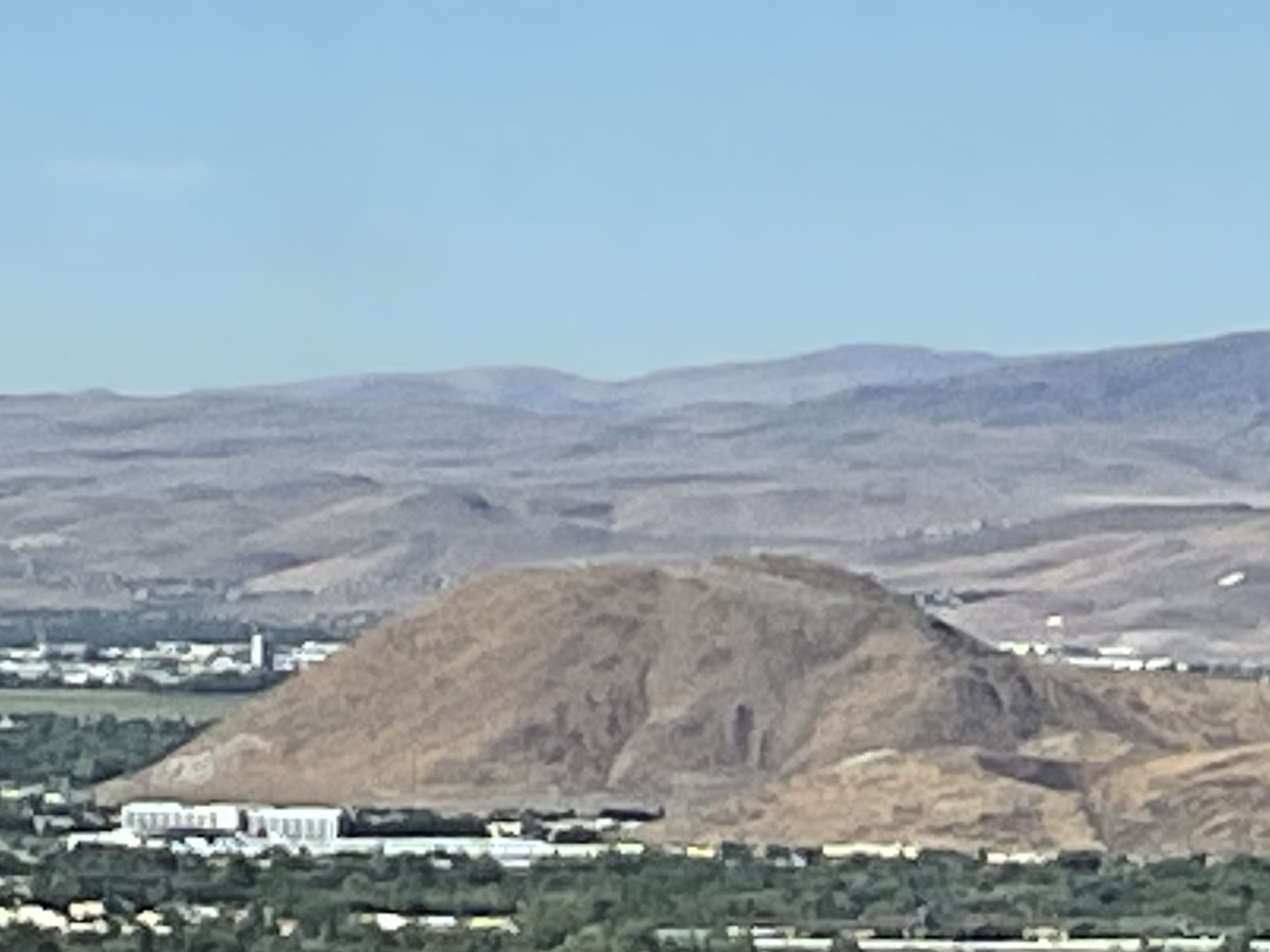
- Rattlesnake Mountain, the volcanic butte with the highest elevation

Highest point
- Peak: 5,014 feet (1,528 m), Rattlesnake Mountain
- Prominence: 542.5 ft (165.4 m)
- Isolation: 2.4 mi (3.9 km)
- Coordinates: 39°28′19″N 119°45′29″W

Naming
- Etymology: Granville Huffaker

Geography
- Location: Washoe County, Nevada, United States

The Huffaker Hills are a collection of volcanic domes in Washoe County, Nevada, near Reno–Tahoe International Airport. The peak at Rattlesnake Mountain lies at 5,014 feet (1,528 m) above sea level. The domes were created by volcanic activity between 1.14 and 2.53 million years ago. There are hiking opportunities.

== Etymology ==
Huffaker Hills is named after Granville Huffaker, a rancher who settled in the Truckee Meadows in 1858. Rattlesnake Mountain was named for its rattlesnake populations.

== Human history ==
In 1858, Granville Huffaker and predominantly Mormon settlers began ranching and settling in the area, with Huffaker driving 500 cattle head. This was the origin of Huffaker's, a small settlement with about 300 people by 1864. Langton's Express and a post office operated in the settlement in 1862, and a stop on the Virginia and Truckee Railroad Reno to Virginia City route was functional in 1872. Huffaker's is marked by Nevada historical marker 238.

== Geology ==
Volcanic activity between 1.14 and 2.53 million years ago formed Steamboat Hills and Huffaker Hills. They are part of a collection of cone–shaped volcanic domes, and related andesite flows that formed a stratovolcano complex. The individual hills are volcanic buttes. Faults run through the area.

== Geography ==
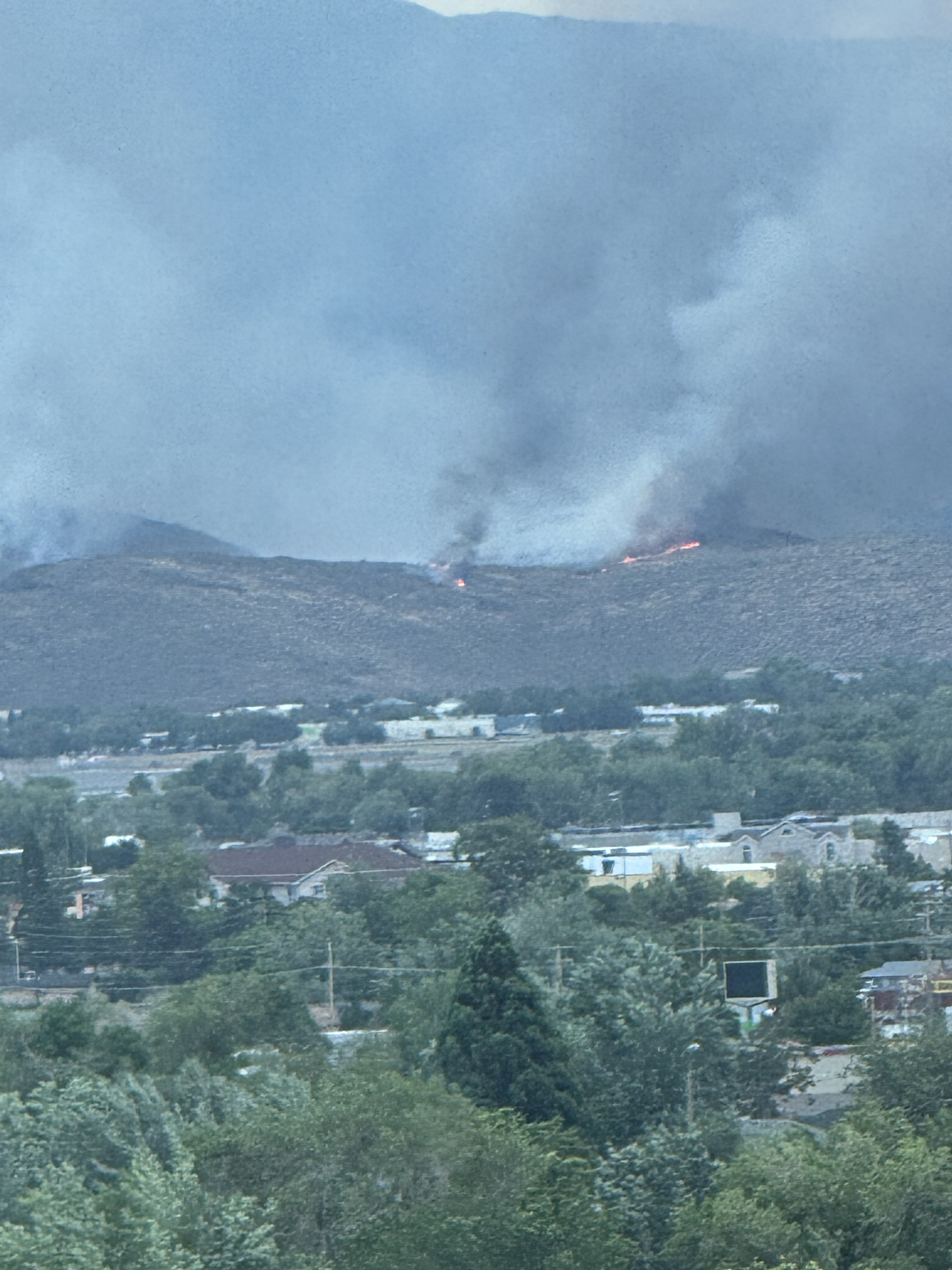
The Barron Fire on July 1, 2025

The hills are in a grass prairie near Reno–Tahoe International Airport. Huffaker Hills also lies near a departing airway.

=== Wildfires ===
In September 2010, a wildfire caused by illegal fireworks burned just over 80 acres (32 ha) on Rattlesnake Mountain and prompted evacuations for nearby residents. On June 27, 2024, a 0.25 acres (0.10 ha) brush fire caused power outages for roughly 400 citizens. On July 5 that same year, fireworks were the probable cause of a 14 acres (5.7 ha) brush fire. On July 1, 2025, the Barron Fire ignited from a resident operating machinery that threw sparks. The fire burned 290 acres (120 ha), closing several local roads, and prompted evacuations. A man was arrested on several charges, among of which arson, for starting a wildfire that burned just over 11 acres (4.5 ha).

== Ecology ==
Huffaker Hills has seasonal wildflowers, including Balsamorhiza hookeri. There are also bird, butterfly, lizard, and rabbit species. Rattlesnake Mountain has rattlesnake populations.

== Recreation ==
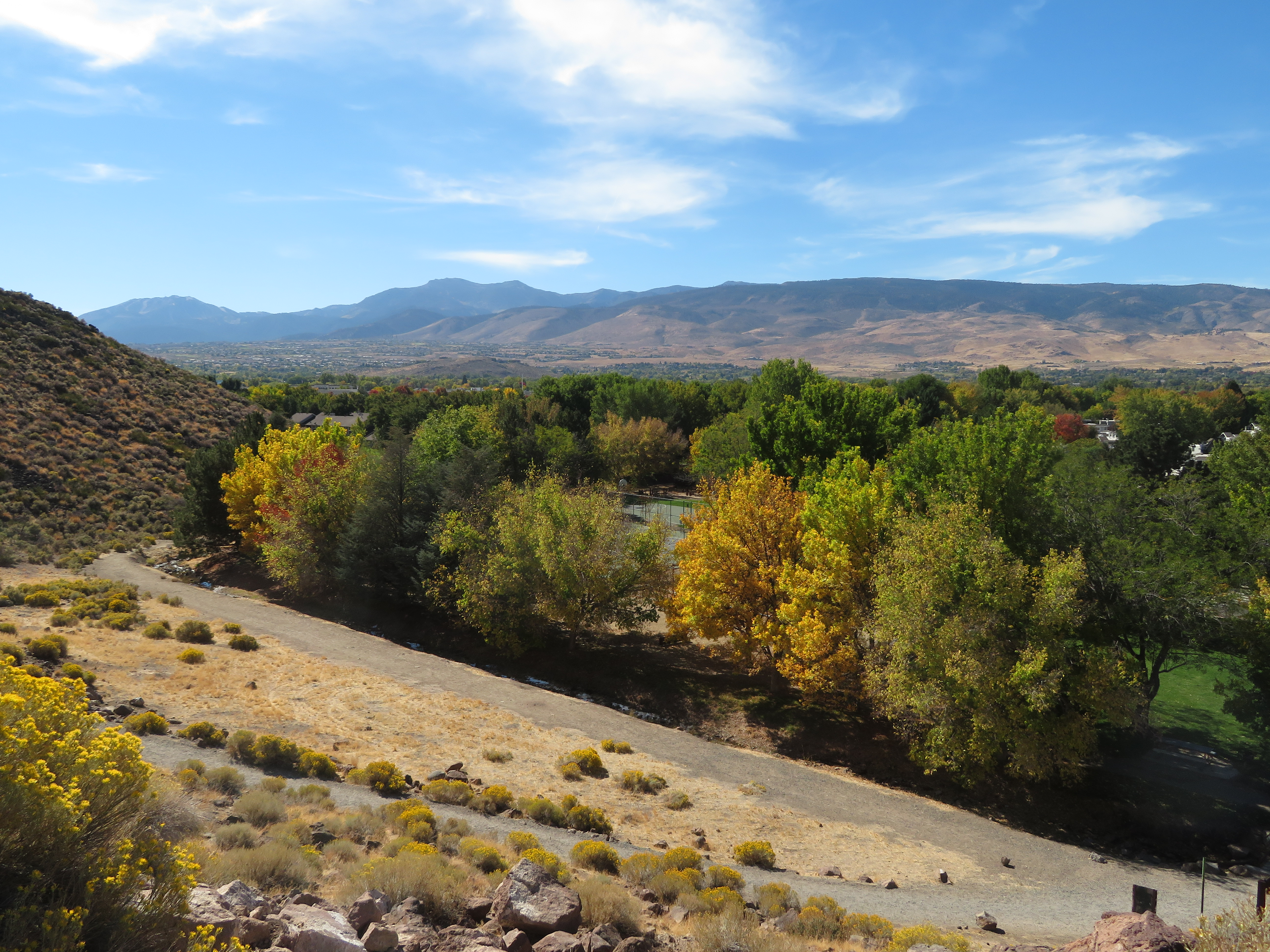
View of Huffaker Hills Trailhead

Huffaker Hills are four dirt trails: Huffaker Hills Trailhead, Lakeview Loop Trail, Twin Peaks Trial, and Western Loop Trail. Additionally, there are picnic benches and formerly portable toilets, which were removed during the COVID-19 pandemic. Departing planes from Reno–Tahoe International Airport can be seen.
