= Raycraft Ranch =

- U.S. National Register of Historic Places
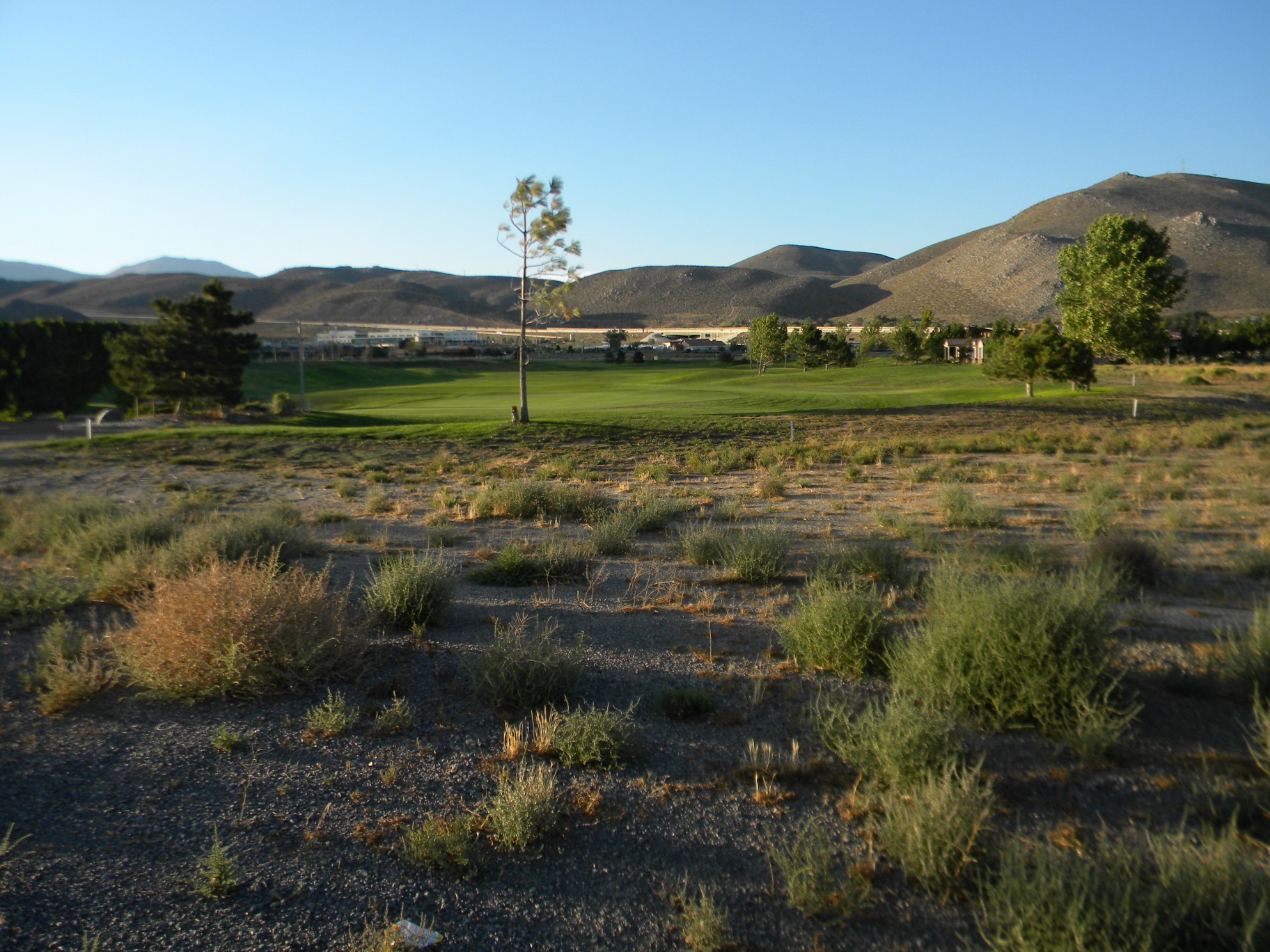
- Location: N of Carson City, on U. S. 395, Carson City, Nevada
- Area: 334.2 acres (135.2 ha)
- NRHP reference No.: 76002243
- Added to NRHP: May 4, 1976

The Raycraft Ranch, located north of Carson City, Nevada on US 395 was listed on the National Register of Historic Places in 1976. It has significance for being the site of the first airplane flight in Nevada, on June 23, 1910. The listing included 334.2 acres (135.2 ha) with two contributing buildings and one other contributing structure.

According to the NRHP nomination for the site:

The first airplane flight in the state of Nevada took place on June 23, 1910, at the Raycraft Ranch near Carson City. The flight is of national historical significance because all previous flights throughout the country had been made at or near sea-level and it was thought that powered flight at such an altitude, 4,675 feet, was impossible. Ivy Baldwin, a nationally-known parachutist and balloonist, made the flight in a 48-horsepower Curtiss-Paulhan biplane. The flight also involved experimentation with the proper strength fuel, again because of the altitude.

The first flight was to a height above ground of about 30 feet (9.1 m), and for distance of about 1/4 mile (0.40 km) 1/4 mile, limited by a breakdown in the plane.

== See also ==
- Arthur Raycraft House, also NRHP-listed, in Tonopah, Nevada; Arthur Raycraft came from the Carson City area to Tonopah
