= Old Las Vegas Mormon Fort State Historic Park =

State park in Nevada, U.S.

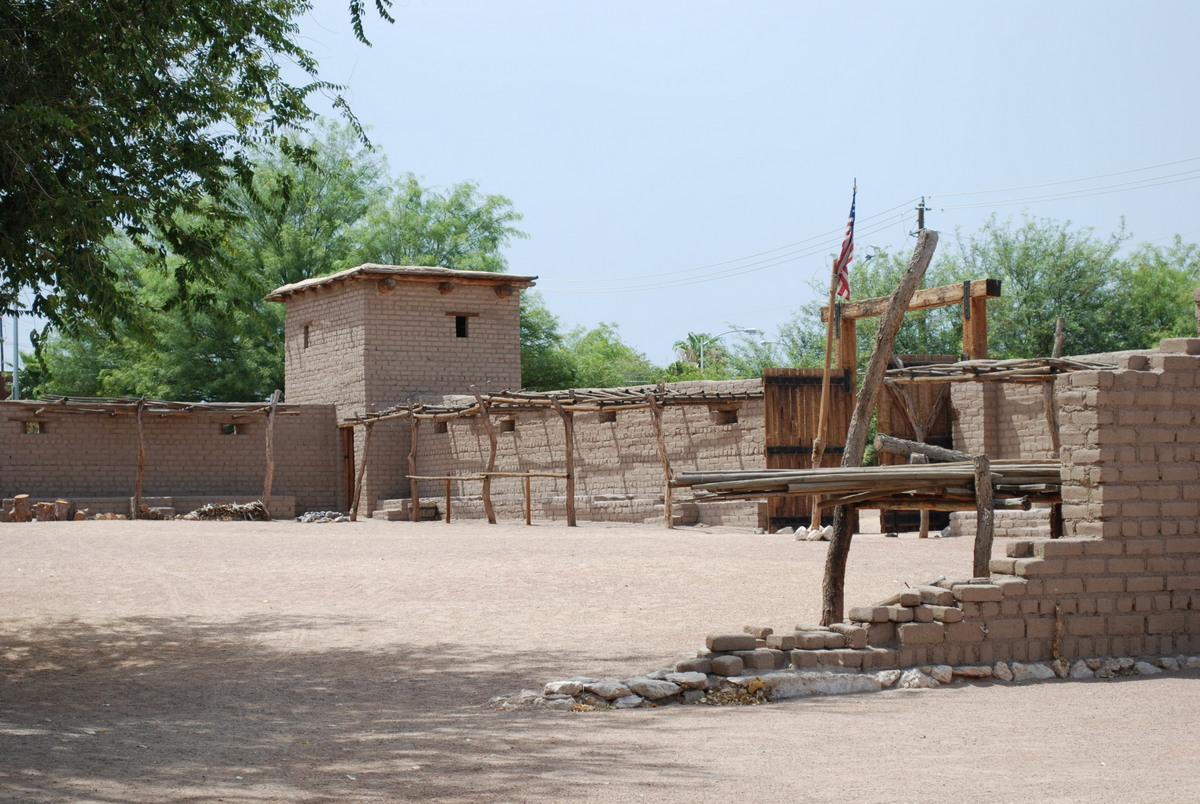
- Reconstructed portion of fort in downtown Las Vegas

- Location within Downtown Las Vegas Location within Nevada
- Location: Las Vegas, Nevada, United States
- Coordinates: 36°10′50″N 115°08′01″W
- Area: 3.16 acres (1.28 ha)
- Elevation: 1,923 ft (586 m)
- Established: 1991
- Administrator: Nevada Division of State Parks
- Designation: Nevada state historic park
- Website: Official website
- Las Vegas Mormon Fort
- U.S. National Register of Historic Places
- Nevada Historical Marker
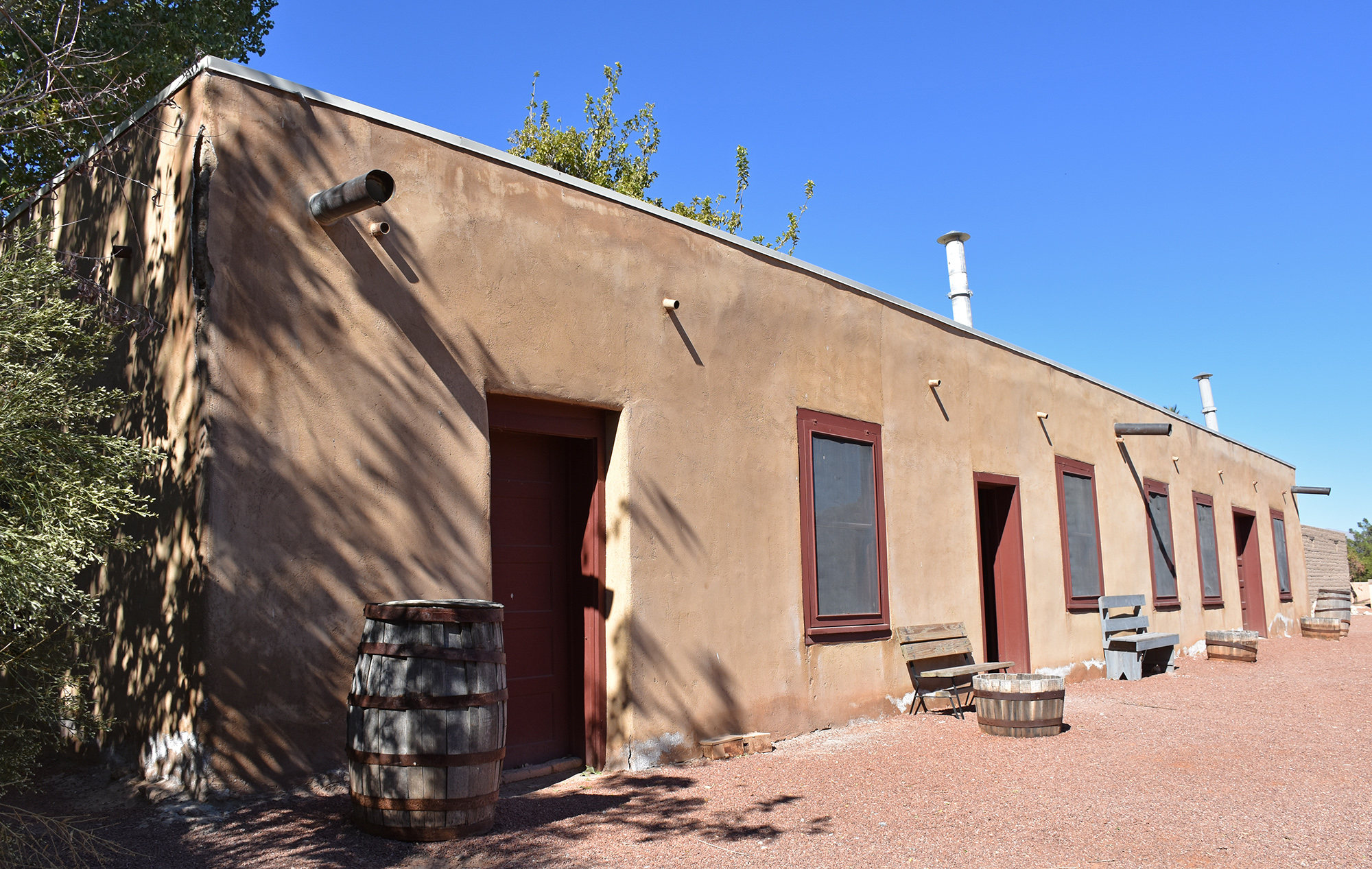
- Part of the original fort, later remodeled and used as a testing laboratory by the U.S. Bureau of Reclamation
- Location: 500 E. Washington Ave. Las Vegas, Nevada
- Area: 0.699 acres (0.283 ha)
- Built: 1855
- NRHP reference No.: 72000764 (original); 78003379 (increase)
- Marker No.: 35

Significant dates
- Added to NRHP: February 1, 1972
- Boundary increase: December 12, 1978

Old Las Vegas Mormon Fort State Historic Park is a state park of Nevada. It contains the Old Mormon Fort (completed 1855), the first permanent structure built in what would become Las Vegas fifty years later. In present-day Las Vegas, the site is at the southeast corner of Las Vegas Boulevard and Washington Avenue, less than one mile north of the downtown area and Fremont Street. This is the only U.S. state park located in a city that houses the first building ever built in that city. The fort was listed on the National Register of Historic Places on February 1, 1972. The site is memorialized with a tablet erected by the Church of Jesus Christ of Latter-day Saints in 1997, along with Nevada Historical Marker #35, and two markers placed by the Daughters of Utah Pioneers.

== Architecture and purpose ==
It was built in the New Mexico folk carpenter architectural style to facilitate travel along the Spanish Trail, and to enable Mormon missionary work in the Las Vegas Valley and to those traveling from New Mexico to California.

The fort was surrounded by 14-foot (4.3 m) high adobe walls that extended for 150 feet (46 m). While called a fort, it was never home to any military troops but like many Mormon forts provided a defense and shelter for local settlers and travelers.

== History ==
=== Mormon period ===
Mormon missionaries led by William Bringhurst arrived on June 14, 1855, and selected a site, along one of the creeks that flowed from the Las Vegas Springs, on which they would build the fort. The fort served as the midpoint on the trail between Salt Lake City, Utah and Los Angeles, California. As a result of the beginning of the Utah War, the Mormons abandoned the fort.

=== Civil War period ===
Around 1860, a small detachment of U.S. Army troops was assigned to protect the settlers at the fort.

The fort was called Fort Baker during the Civil War, named after Edward Dickinson Baker. In a letter from Col. James Henry Carleton written to Pacific Department headquarters, December 23, 1861, Carleton mentions his plan to send an advance party of seven companies from Fort Yuma to reoccupy Fort Mojave and reestablish the ferry there. Carleton then intended to send on from there three cavalry companies and one of infantry to the Mormon fort at Las Vegas, and establish a post called Fort Baker. This was in preparation for an advance to Salt Lake City the following year. The move to reoccupy Fort Mojave never occurred as planned because Carleton's California Column at Fort Yuma were sent instead into Arizona and New Mexico to evict the Confederates there the next year. However, Fort Mojave was later reoccupied in 1863 by Union troops from California. In 1864, a road survey party led by Captain Price, Company M, 2nd California Cavalry Regiment traveled on the route from Fort Douglas to Fort Mojave passing through Las Vegas, stopping for water there on June 10. No mention is made of any garrison there. Presumably the post was never garrisoned during the Civil War.

=== Ranching/early Las Vegas period ===
In 1865, Octavius Gass re-occupied the fort and started the irrigation works, renaming the area to Los Vegas Rancho (later renamed Las Vegas in 1902). Gass defaulted on a loan to Archibald Stewart in 1881 and lost the ranch, with Stewart and his wife Helen becoming the new caretakers. In 1902, William A. Clark's San Pedro, Los Angeles, and Salt Lake Railroad acquired the property from Helen Stewart along with most of what is now downtown Las Vegas, transferring most of the company's land to the now defunct Las Vegas Land and Water Company.

=== Site preservation ===
Ownership of the fort and the land around it changed hands many times and it had several close calls with destruction. In 1955, the land was acquired by the Las Vegas Elks. With support of the Daughters of Utah Pioneers, the city of Las Vegas acquired the fort in 1989. Long-term protection was gained when the state acquired the site as a state park in 1991.

A $4.5 million renovation and visitor center, designed by assemblageSTUDIO, was completed in 2005. A visitor center explains the history of the fort.

== In popular culture ==
The fort appears in the 2010 video game Fallout: New Vegas, where it is depicted as the base of operations for the Followers of the Apocalypse, a group aiming to help the area's residents.

== See also ==
- Mormon Station State Historic Park
- Las Vegas Mission
- Fort Lemhi
- Fort Supply - another Mormon fort with a similar purpose
- List of the oldest buildings in Nevada
