= Glendale School =

- U.S. National Register of Historic Places
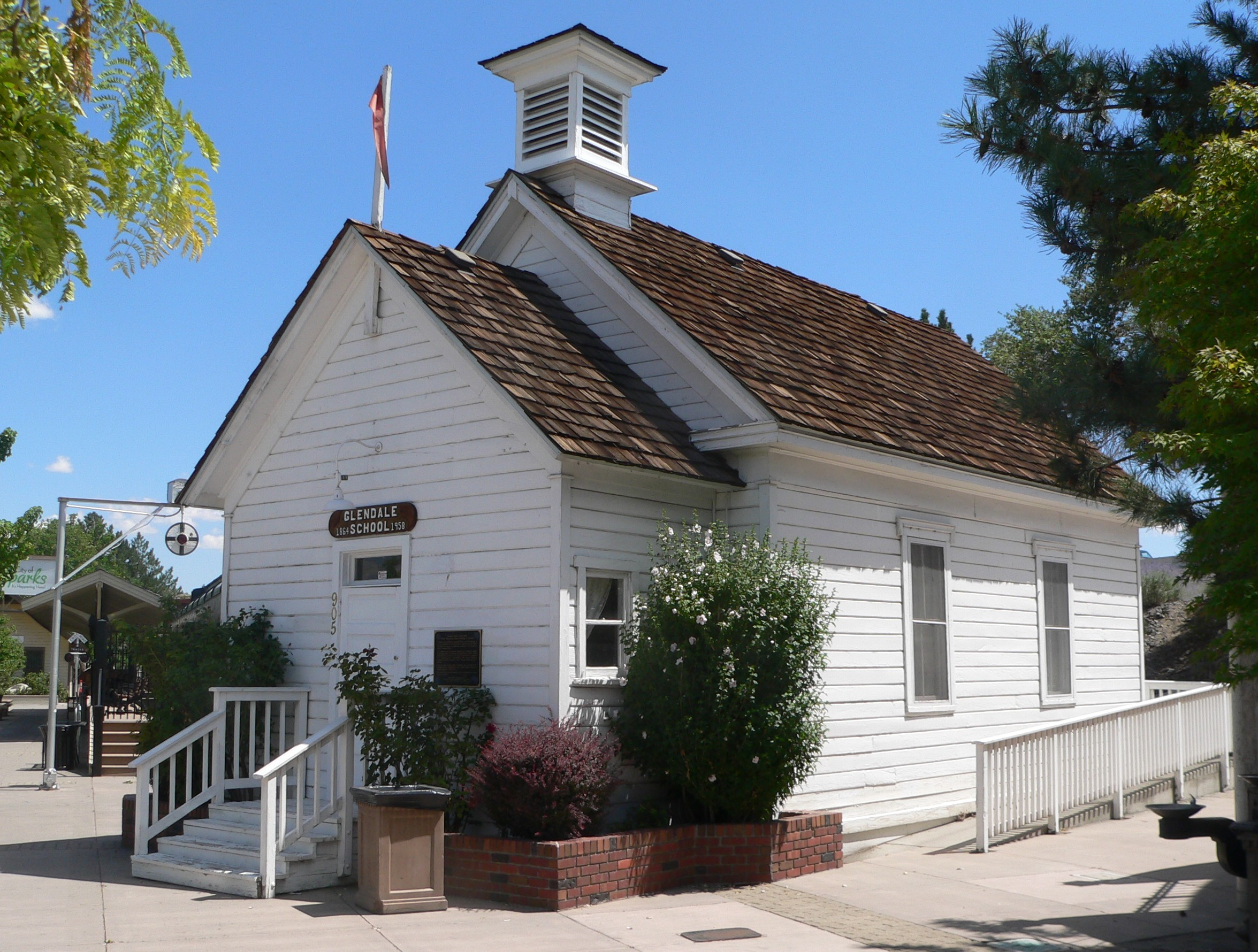
- Glendale School in Victorian Square

- Location within Nevada Location within the United States
- Location: Victorian Avenue, Sparks, Nevada
- Coordinates: 39°32′04″N 119°45′17″W
- Area: 1 acre (0.40 ha)
- Built: 1864
- Built by: Bryant, Archie
- NRHP reference No.: 78001729
- Added to NRHP: January 30, 1978

The Glendale School of Sparks, Nevada, is the oldest remaining schoolhouse in the state and is also reported to be the longest operating school in the state. It was built in 1864 and served as a school until 1958. It is listed on the National Register of Historic Places in 1978.

It was deemed significant as the first educational institution in the "Truckee Meadows" area, where, in 1857, Charles C. Gates and John F. Stone created a rope ferry across the Truckee River and opened a trading post, leading to further development. It was built by Archie Bryant.

In 1976, the school building was moved to a site near the intersection in Reno, and in 1993, it was moved again, to its current location, part of the Victorian Square development in Sparks.

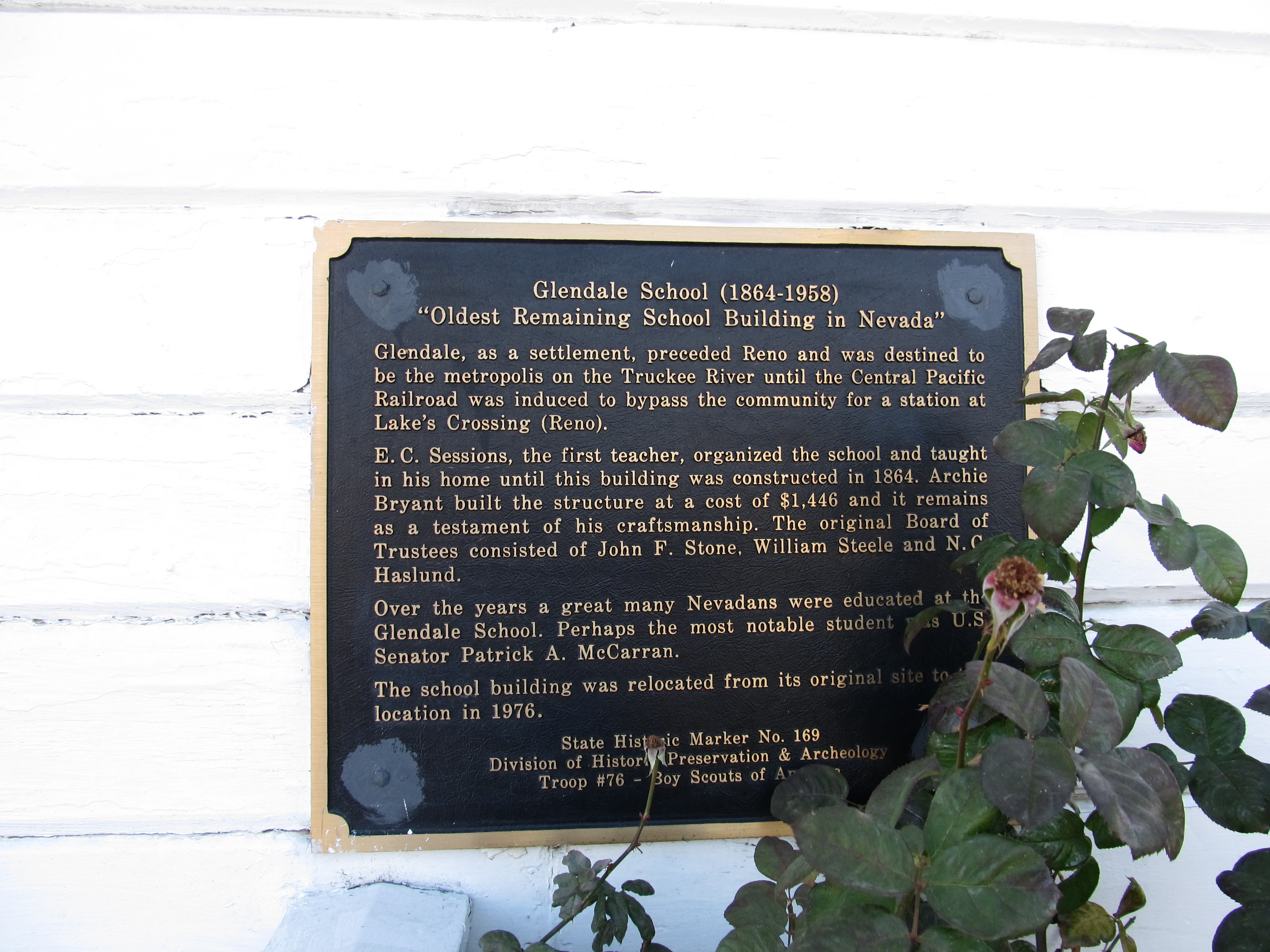
Historical Marker of the school
