= Eureka Historic District (Eureka, Nevada) =

Historic district in Nevada, United States

- U.S. National Register of Historic Places
- U.S. Historic district
- Nevada Historical Marker No. 11
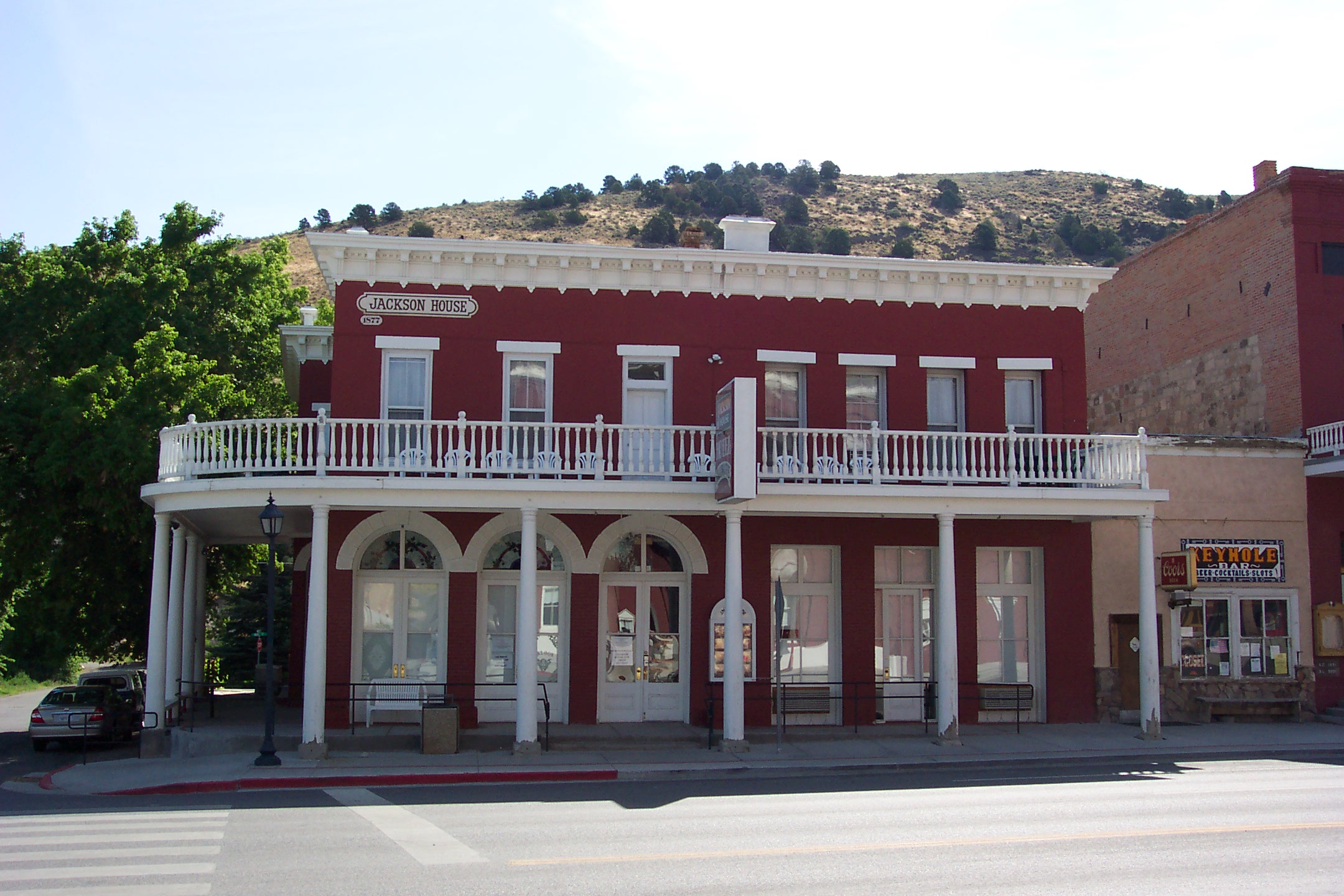
- The historic Jackson House Hotel, Eureka, NV, built 1877

- Location within Nevada Location within the United States
- Location: Along U.S. 50; Eureka, Nevada
- Coordinates: 39°30′47″N 115°57′53″W
- Built: 1869
- Architectural style: Late Victorian, Renaissance
- NRHP reference No.: 73001078
- Marker No.: 11
- Added to NRHP: April 13, 1973

Eureka Historic District is a historic district in Eureka, Nevada, United States, that is listed on the National Register of Historic Places.

== Description ==
Of the many mining boomtowns in Nevada, Eureka is one of the best preserved, primarily due to the gradual decline of mining in the area, with the last mine in the area closing in 1970. "The very gradual decline in the towns fortunes is primarily responsible for the unusual state of preservation of the town. There was always just a little money coming in to keep things in repairs but not enough money to tear down the old buildings and replace them with new ones."

The district was listed on the National Register of Historic Places in 1973. It is also Nevada Historical Marker number 11.

The name Eureka came from an old Greek term which means “I have found it”. Historical establishments of Eureka Historic District include Eureka High School, the Sentinel Museum Building, the Eureka Courthouse, the Colonnade Hotel and the Opera House. Starting from 1864, the leading industry of Eureka is mining. It is the home for many outdoor activities like fishing, hunting, camping, hiking, horseback riding and many more for the tourists.

== History and Context ==
In the year of 1864, only a few silver mines were opened and that’s when Eureka started its journey. The processing of silver was very hard though, because of its amalgamation with lead ore.

The circumstances improved in 1869 because an advanced smelter was set up which could successfully separate the silver from the lead. Excessive amount of heat was necessary for this proceeding. In the next few years, several other smelters were constructed which led to the increase of mining activity step by step. The constant development kept the town stable and made it possible to get going as a lasting mining town. Some sources stated that from 1871 to 1885, the population grew to about eight thousand to nine thousand. A new local government separated from Lander County, Eureka turned out to be the seat of Eureka country in 1873. In 1880, a magnificent Italianate courthouse was constructed which is in use till date.

After the year of 1885, the activity of mining became slow because of the exhaustion of silver in the mines. At the beginning of 1890s, most of the mines were shut down. Though the discoveries of ore were limited, luckily because of the continuation Eureka remained on the map. This slow-going continuation came up with a secured flow of earning. And this is the sole reason for preserving the town, because there were insufficient earnings to build new buildings, tearing down the old establishments. In the 1970s, the remaining mines were shut down. Afterwards in the 1980s, gold was discovered in the Carlin Trend, that’s why several new mines were opened. The restoration of the historic buildings was possible because Eureka was getting a handsome amount of revenue from the mines and these mines led Nevada to be the highest gold producer in the United States.

== See also ==
- National Register of Historic Places listings in Eureka County, Nevada
