= List of census-designated places in Nevada =

Map of the United States with Nevada highlighted

Nevada is a state located in the Western United States. Nevada has several census-designated places (CDPs) which are unincorporated communities lacking elected municipal officers and boundaries with legal status.

List of other places in Nevada
Name	Type of Settlement	County	Population (2020 census)
Alamo	CDP	Lincoln	785
Amargosa Valley	CDP	Nye	1,064
Austin	CDP	Lander	167
Baker	CDP	White Pine	41
Battle Mountain	CDP	Lander	3,705
Beatty	CDP	Nye	880
Beaverdam	CDP	Lincoln	40
Bennett Springs	CDP	Lincoln	158
Blue Diamond	CDP	Clark	268
Bunkerville	CDP	Clark	1,069
Cal-Nev-Ari	CDP	Clark	144
Carter Springs	CDP	Douglas	585
Cold Springs	CDP	Washoe	10,153
Crescent Valley	CDP	Eureka	512
Crystal Bay	CDP	Washoe	337
Dayton	CDP	Lyon	15,153
Denio	CDP	Humboldt	34
Double Spring	CDP	Douglas	180
Dry Valley	CDP	Lincoln	49
Dyer	CDP	Esmeralda	232
East Valley	CDP	Douglas	1,558
Empire	CDP	Washoe	47
Enterprise	CDP	Clark	221,831
Eureka	CDP	Eureka	414
Fallon Station	CDP	Churchill	281
Fish Springs	CDP	Douglas	684
Fort McDermitt	CDP	Humboldt	267
Gabbs	CDP	Nye	186
Gardnerville	CDP	Douglas	6,211
Gardnerville Ranchos	CDP	Douglas	11,318
Genoa	CDP	Douglas	1,343
Gerlach	CDP	Washoe	130
Glenbrook	CDP	Douglas	315
Golconda	CDP	Humboldt	182
Golden Valley	CDP	Washoe	1,580
Goldfield	CDP	Esmeralda	225
Goodsprings	CDP	Clark	162
Grass Valley	CDP	Pershing	991
Hawthorne	CDP	Mineral	3,118
Hiko	CDP	Lincoln	124
Humboldt River Ranch	CDP	Pershing	249
Imlay	CDP	Pershing	210
Incline Village	CDP	Washoe	9,462
Indian Hills	CDP	Douglas	5,962
Indian Springs	CDP	Clark	912
Jackpot	CDP	Elko	855
Johnson Lane	CDP	Douglas	6,409
Kingsbury	CDP	Douglas	2,313
Kingston	CDP	Lander	194
Lakeridge	CDP	Douglas	409
Lamoille	CDP	Elko	130
Laughlin	CDP	Clark	8,658
Lemmon Valley	CDP	Washoe	4,987
Logan Creek	CDP	Douglas	40
Lund	CDP	White Pine	211
McDermitt	CDP	Humboldt	124
McGill	CDP	White Pine	1,010
Mina	CDP	Mineral	127
Minden	CDP	Douglas	3,442
Moapa Town	CDP	Clark	1,006
Moapa Valley	CDP	Clark	6,289
Mogul	CDP	Washoe	1,258
Montello	CDP	Elko	66
Mount Charleston	CDP	Clark	314
Mount Wilson	CDP	Lincoln	26
Mountain City	CDP	Elko	14
Nellis AFB	CDP	Clark	4,379
Nelson	CDP	Clark	22
Nixon	CDP	Washoe	464
Oasis	CDP	Elko	4
Orovada	CDP	Humboldt	117
Osino	CDP	Elko	668
Owyhee	CDP	Elko	1,027
Pahrump	CDP	Nye	44,738
Panaca	CDP	Lincoln	870
Paradise	CDP	Clark	191,238
Paradise Valley	CDP	Humboldt	71
Pioche	CDP	Lincoln	933
Preston	CDP	White Pine	76
Rachel	CDP	Lincoln	48
Round Hill Village	CDP	Douglas	898
Ruhenstroth	CDP	Douglas	1,239
Ruth	CDP	White Pine	371
Sandy Valley	CDP	Clark	1,663
Schurz	CDP	Mineral	656
Searchlight	CDP	Clark	445
Silver City	CDP	Lyon	155
Silver Peak	CDP	Esmeralda	121
Silver Springs	CDP	Lyon	5,629
Skyland	CDP	Douglas	328
Smith Valley	CDP	Lyon	1,710
Spanish Springs	CDP	Washoe	17,314
Spring Creek	CDP	Elko	14,967
Spring Valley	CDP	Clark	215,597
Stagecoach	CDP	Lyon	2,022
Stateline	CDP	Douglas	595
Summerlin South	CDP	Clark	30,744
Sunrise Manor	CDP	Clark	205,618
Sun Valley	CDP	Washoe	21,178
Sutcliffe	CDP	Washoe	282
Tonopah	CDP	Nye	2,179
Topaz Lake	CDP	Douglas	202
Topaz Ranch Estates	CDP	Douglas	1,630
Unionville	CDP	Pershing	27
Ursine	CDP	Lincoln	62
Valmy	CDP	Humboldt	26
Verdi	CDP	Washoe	1,396
Virginia City	CDP	Storey	787
Wadsworth	CDP	Washoe	991
Walker Lake	CDP	Mineral	247
Washoe Valley	CDP	Washoe	3,074
Whitney	CDP	Clark	49,061
Winchester	CDP	Clark	36,403
Zephyr Cove	CDP	Douglas	679
