= Nevada's 17th Senate district =

American legislative district

Nevada's 17th State Senate district
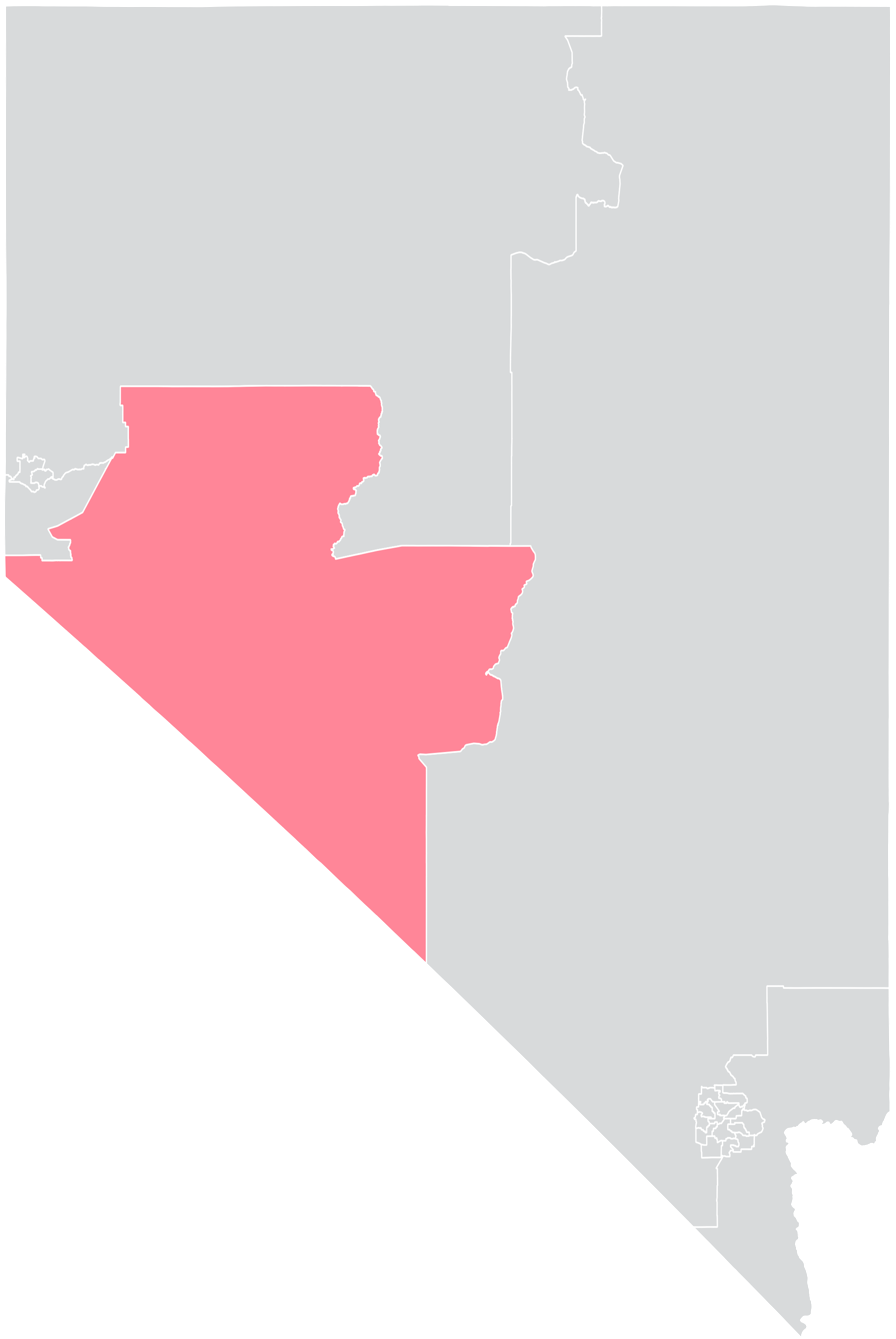
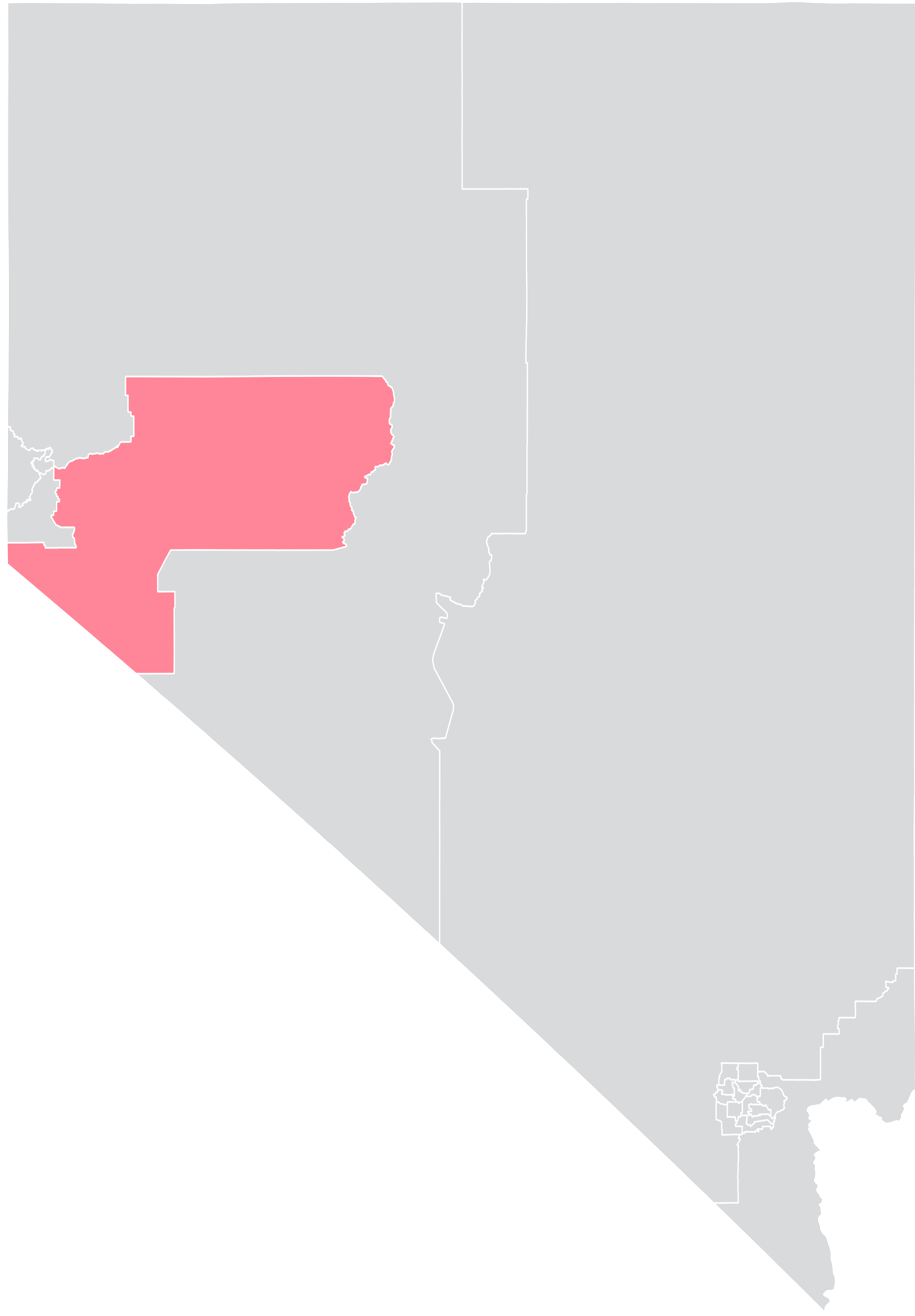
Senator
| Robin Titus; R–Wellington |
- Registration: 50.15% Republican; 28.34% Democratic; 14.63% No party preference
- Demographics: 77% White; 1% Black; 14% Hispanic; 1% Asian; 3% Native American
- Population (2018): 128,934
- Registered voters: 80,917

Nevada's 17th Senate district is one of 21 districts in the Nevada Senate. It has been represented by Republican Robin Titus since 2022, succeeding fellow Republican James Settelmeyer.

== Geography ==
District 17 covers all of Churchill, Douglas, Lyon, and Storey Counties, including the communities of Fallon, East Valley, Gardnerville, Gardnerville Ranchos, Indian Hills, Johnson Lane, Kingsbury, Minden, Ruhenstroth, Topaz Ranch Estates, Fernley, Yerington, Dayton, Silver Springs, Smith Valley, Stagecoach, Stateline, and Virginia City.

The district overlaps with Nevada's 2nd and 4th congressional districts, and with the 38th and 39th districts of the Nevada Assembly. It borders the state of California.

== Recent election results ==
Nevada Senators are elected to staggered four-year terms; since 2012 redistricting, the 17th district has held elections in midterm years.

=== 2022 ===
2022 Nevada State Senate election, District 17
| Party | Candidate | Votes | % |
|---|---|---|---|
| Republican | Robin Titus | 53,823 | 100 |
| Total votes | | 53,823 | 100 |
| Republican hold | | | |

== Historical election results ==
=== 2018 ===
2018 Nevada State Senate election, District 17
| Party | Candidate | Votes | % |
|---|---|---|---|
| Republican | James Settelmeyer (incumbent) | 41,774 | 71.8 |
| Democratic | Curtis Cannon | 16,384 | 28.2 |
| Total votes | | 58,158 | 100 |
| Republican hold | | | |

=== 2014 ===
2014 Nevada State Senate election, District 17
| Party | Candidate | Votes | % |
|---|---|---|---|
| Republican | James Settelmeyer (incumbent) | 35,979 | 100 |
| Total votes | | 35,979 | 100 |
| Republican hold | | | |

=== 2010 ===
2010 Nevada State Senate election, District 17
Primary election
| Party | Candidate | Votes | % |
|---|---|---|---|
| Republican | James Settelmeyer | 12,067 | 83.7 |
| Republican | Steve Yeater | 2,344 | 16.3 |
| Total votes | | 14,411 | 100 |
| Republican | James Settelmeyer | 26,466 | 65.9 |
| Democratic | Kevin R. Ranft | 11,705 | 29.1 |
| Independent | Cody J. Quirk | 1,999 | 5.0 |
| Total votes | | 40,170 | 100 |
| Republican hold | | | |

=== Federal and statewide results ===
| Year | Office | Results |
|---|---|---|
| 2020 | President | Trump 67.1 – 29.9% |
| 2018 | Senate | Heller 67.1 – 28.1% |
| 2018 | Governor | Laxalt 67.2 – 26.9% |
| 2016 | President | Trump 65.8 – 27.0% |
| 2012 | President | Romney 63.5 – 34.2% |
| 2012 | Senate | Heller 65.2 – 25.3% |
