= List of Nevada locations by per capita income =

Nevada is the sixteenth richest state in the United States of America, with a per capita income of $21,989 (2000) and a personal per capita income of $31,266 (2003).

== Nevada counties and cities ranked by per capita income ==
Note: Data is from the 2010 United States Census Data and the 2006-2010 American Community Survey 5-Year Estimates.

Rank	County	Per capita income	Median household income	Median family income	Population	Number of households
1	Douglas	$35,239	$60,721	$73,543	46,997	19,638
2	Esmeralda	$34,571	$39,712	$57,292	783	389
3	Storey	$31,079	$61,525	$65,121	4,010	1,742
4	Eureka	$30,306	$61,400	$75,179	1,987	836
5	Washoe	$29,687	$55,658	$67,428	421,407	163,445
	Nevada	$27,589	$55,726	$64,418	2,700,551	1,006,250
6	Carson City	$27,568	$52,067	$65,389	55,274	21,427
7	Clark	$27,422	$56,258	$63,888	1,951,269	715,365
	United States	$27,334	$51,914	$62,982	308,745,538	116,716,292
8	Elko	$26,879	$67,038	$75,171	48,818	17,442
9	Humboldt	$25,965	$55,656	$69,032	16,528	6,289
10	Lander	$25,287	$66,525	$67,157	5,775	2,213
11	Mineral	$23,226	$35,446	$57,064	4,772	2,240
12	Nye	$22,687	$41,181	$50,218	43,946	11,929
13	White Pine	$21,615	$48,545	$62,946	10,030	3,707
14	Lyon	$21,041	$48,433	$56,106	51,980	19,808
15	Lincoln	$18,148	$44,695	$56,167	5,345	1,988
16	Pershing	$17,519	$56,491	$61,410	6,753	2,018

== Nevada places ranked by per capita income ==
Rank	Place	County	Per Capita Income	Median House- hold Income	Population	Number of Households
1	Incline Village-Crystal Bay	Washoe County	$52,521	$69,447	9,952	4,176
2	Kingsbury	Douglas County	$41,451	$59,511	2,624	1,176
3	Mount Charleston	Clark County	$38,821	$63,125	285	133
4	Verdi-Mogul	Washoe County	$38,233	$67,708	2,949	1,159
5	Zephyr Cove-Round Hill Village	Douglas County	$37,218	$60,851	1,649	798
6	Summerlin	Clark County	$33,017	$64,784	3,735	
7	Blue Diamond	Clark County	$30,479	$54,091	290	118
8	Minden	Douglas County	$30,405	$56,795	3,001	1,166
9	Boulder City	Clark County	$29,770			
10	Spanish Springs	Washoe County	$26,908	$69,451	15,064	3,014
13	Enterprise	Clark County	$25,063	$50,667	14,676	5,917
14	Johnson Lane	Douglas County	$24,247	$59,130	4,837	1,786
15	Virginia City	Storey County	$23,765	$45,441	2,533	1,064
16	Indian Hills	Douglas County	$23,027	$56,109	4,407	1,661
17	Reno	Washoe County	$22,520	$40,350	180,480	73,904
18	Goodsprings	Clark County	$22,282	$40,430	232	107
19	Las Vegas	Clark County	$22,060	$44,069	596,424	211,689
20	Smith Valley	Lyon County	$21,940	$46,121	1,425	552
21	Lemmon Valley-Golden Valley	Washoe County	$21,820	$52,861	6,855	2,418
22	Winnemucca	Humboldt County	$21,441	$46,699	7,174	2,736
23	Paradise	Clark County	$21,258	$39,376	186,070	77,209
24	Sparks	Washoe County	$21,122	$45,745	66,346	24,601
25	Laughlin	Clark County	$21,097	$36,885	7,076	3,177
26	Carson City	Carson City	$20,943	$41,809	52,457	20,171
27	Cal-Nev-Ari	Clark County	$20,870	$42,563	278	154
28	Gardnerville Ranchos	Douglas County	$20,856	$48,795	11,054	4,003
29	Gardnerville	Douglas County	$20,670	$41,204	3,357	1,473
30	Winchester	Clark County	$20,614	$32,251	26,958	11,986
31	Spring Creek	Elko County	$20,606	$60,109	10,548	3,399
32	Cold Springs	Washoe County	$20,561	$54,511	3,834	1,316
33	Caliente	Lincoln County	$20,555	$25,833	1,123	408
34	Goldfield	Esmeralda County	$20,320	$32,969	449	223
35	Mesquite	Clark County	$20,191	$40,392	9,389	3,498
36	Elko	Elko County	$20,101	$48,608	16,708	6,200
37	Searchlight	Clark County	$19,606	$24,407	576	315
38	Carlin	Elko County	$19,377	$49,571	2,161	792
39	Yerington	Lyon County	$18,640	$31,151	2,883	1,203
40	Fernley	Lyon County	$18,622	$44,695	8,543	3,151
41	Dayton	Lyon County	$18,417	$43,599	5,907	2,198
42	Tonopah	Nye County	$18,256	$37,401	2,627	1,109
43	Hawthorne	Mineral County	$17,830	$34,413	3,311	1,465
44	Pahrump	Nye County	$17,708	$34,860	24,631	10,153
45	Moapa Town	Clark County	$17,587	$48,365	928	273
46	Sandy Valley	Clark County	$17,439	$43,663	1,804	714
47	Lovelock	Pershing County	$17,233	$34,563	2,003	778
48	Ely	White Pine County	$17,013	$36,408	4,041	1,727
49	Battle Mountain	Lander County	$16,975	$42,981	2,871	1,053
50	Beatty	Nye County	$16,971	$41,250	1,154	535
51	Whitney	Clark County	$16,969	$36,536	18,273	7,090
52	Fallon	Churchill County	$16,919	$35,935	7,536	3,004
53	Wells	Elko County	$16,835	$35,870	1,346	525
54	Bunkerville	Clark County	$16,820	$45,076	1,014	258
55	Moapa Valley	Clark County	$16,696	$39,942	5,784	1,934
56	Sunrise Manor	Clark County	$16,659	$41,066	156,120	53,745
57	Silver Springs	Lyon County	$16,576	$34,427	4,708	1,766
58	Stateline	Douglas County	$16,084	$28,641	1,215	510
59	North Las Vegas	Clark County	$16,023	$46,057	115,488	34,018
60	McGill	White Pine County	$15,643	$32,039	1,054	448
61	Gabbs	Nye County	$15,322	$28,500	318	133
62	Sun Valley	Washoe County	$15,171	$41,346	19,461	6,380
63	Gerlach-Empire	Washoe County	$14,793	$35,089	499	234
64	Wadsworth	Washoe County	$14,756	$31,198	881	328
65	Indian Springs	Clark County	$14,687	$40,966	1,302	526
66	Sutcliffe	Washoe County	$13,629	$31,250	281	105
67	Nellis Air Force Base	Clark County	$13,601	$33,118	8,896	2,873
68	Jackpot	Elko County	$13,261	$30,488	1,326	480
69	West Wendover	Elko County	$12,013	$34,116	4,721	1,363
70	Fallon Station	Churchill County	$11,719	$34,236	1,265	358
71	Schurz	Mineral County	$10,886	$24,265	721	281
72	Nixon	Washoe County	$9,926	$25,417	418	132
73	Owyhee	Elko County	$9,869	$23,214	1,017	323
74	McDermitt	Humboldt County	$6,399	$16,563	269	90
