= Western Nevada =

Coordinates: 40.615°N 119.782°W

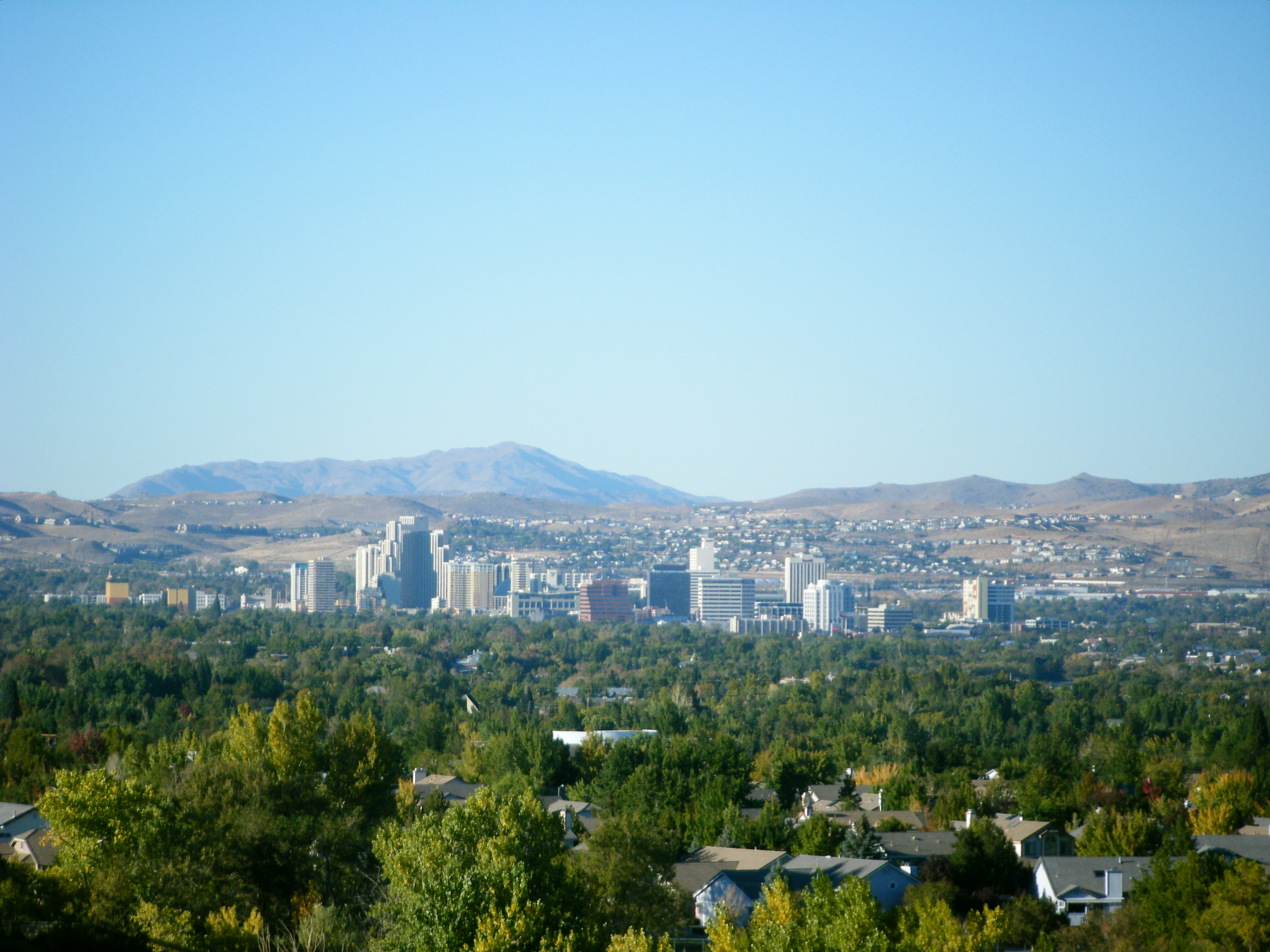
- Reno skyline

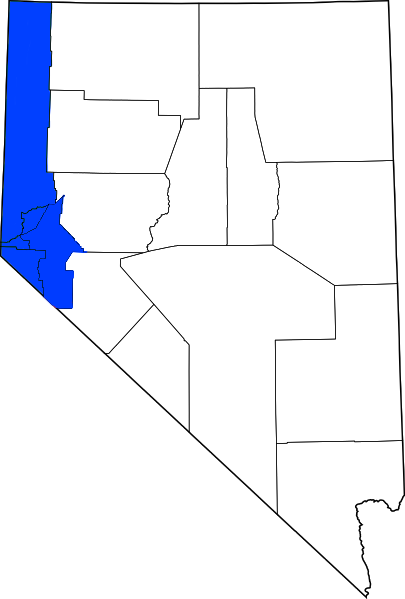
- The counties most commonly associated with Western Nevada with Churchill County not shown in blue
- Country: United States
- State: Nevada
- Counties: Carson City; Churchill; Douglas; Lyon; Storey; Washoe
- Largest city: Reno

Western Nevada is a region and the northwestern portion of the U.S. state of Nevada that includes Reno, Carson City, Carson Valley and Virginia City. Lyon County and Churchill County are sometimes also referred to as part of Western Nevada.

The region is the second most populous in the state (the first being Southern Nevada containing the Las Vegas Valley) with between 530,000 and 615,000 residents, depending on whether Lyon and Churchill counties are included. It is also the historic population center of Nevada, with the state capital in Carson City, the University of Nevada in Reno and several state historic parks, notably Mormon Station State Historic Park in Genoa, the state's first permanent European settlement.

== Geography ==
Western Nevada encompasses the western edge of the state, with the term generally applied to areas within 100 miles (160 km) of the California border, from Mineral County northward. On the west along the California border, the Sierra Nevada mountains rise sharply from the Great Basin desert floor. Basin and Range Province topography extends east from the Sierras, with mountain ranges such as the Virginia Range, Pah Rah Range and Pine Nut Mountains separating the more densely populated Sierra front with the desert plains to the east. The mountains act as a second rain shadow for Pacific storms rolling east.

Three rivers flow off the Sierras to the Great Basin — the Truckee River, Carson River and Walker River. The Truckee Canyon through the Virginia and Pah Rah mountains serves as the route for Interstate 80 between Fernley and Reno. Pyramid Lake and Washoe Lake collect water in their respective endorheic basins, and the Lake Lahontan Reservoir impounds the Carson River to distribute water for irrigation in Churchill County.

== Transportation ==
The main roads in the region are Interstate 80, U.S. Route 50 and U.S. Route 395. US 395 runs from the Los Angeles area to the Pacific Northwest along the eastern Sierras and is a freeway for about 51 of its 85 miles (137 km) through Nevada. Part of US 395 is also I-580. About 35,000 cars daily use I-580 and US 395 between Reno and Carson City.

I-80 is the main east-west route through the region, connecting with Sacramento and the San Francisco Bay Area to the west and the Great Basin and Salt Lake City to the east. It also connects the rapidly growing community of Fernley with Reno and serves as a route to access the resort communities at Lake Tahoe.

US 50 also connects to Sacramento to the west, running along Lake Tahoe before descending to Carson City. To the east, it connects Dayton, Silver Springs and Fallon to the state capital.

=== Counties ===
Western Nevada generally includes the following counties:

- Carson City (an independent city not included in any county)
- Douglas County
- Lyon County
- Storey County
- Washoe County

== Cities and towns ==
- Reno, Nevada
- Sparks, Nevada
- Carson City, Nevada
- Minden, Nevada
- Gardnerville, Nevada
- Incline Village, Nevada
- Virginia City, Nevada
- Indian Hills, Nevada
- Johnson Lane, Nevada
- Fernley, Nevada
- Fallon, Nevada
- Dayton, Nevada
- Silver Springs, Nevada
- Spanish Springs, Nevada
- Yerington, Nevada
- Genoa, Nevada
- Zephyr Cove, Nevada

== See also ==
- Great Basin Desert
