= Reno metropolitan area =

Reno–Carson City–Gardnerville Ranchos, NV–CA Combined Statistical Area
- Combined Statistical Area
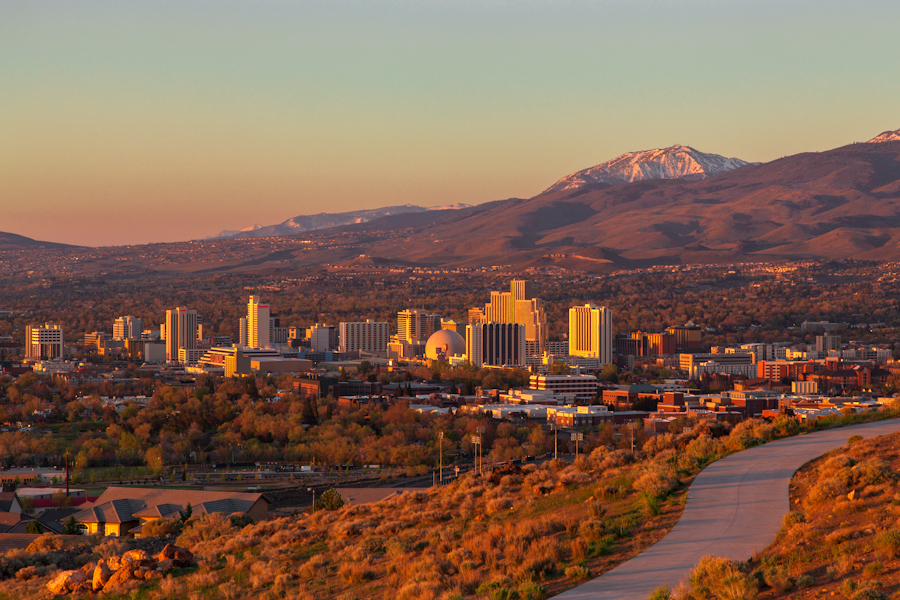
- Reno skyline
Map of Reno–Carson City–Gardnerville, NV–CA CSA
Reno, NV MSA
Carson City, NV MSA
Gardnerville Ranchos, NV–CA μSA
Fallon, NV μSA
- Country: United States
- State: Nevada; California
- Largest city: Reno
- Other principal cities: - Sparks; - Carson City; - Fernley; - Gardnerville Ranchos; - Fallon

Area
  - Total: 9,983 sq mi (25,857 km^{2})

Population (2010)
  - Total: 425,417

GDP
  - Total: $40.095 billion (2022)
- Time zone: UTC−8 (PST)
  - Summer (DST): UTC−7 (PDT)

The Reno–Sparks Metropolitan Statistical Area, as defined by the United States Census Bureau, is an area consisting of three counties in Western Nevada, anchored by the cities of Reno and Sparks. As of the 2020 census, the MSA had a population of 549,831.

== Counties ==
- Lyon
- Storey
- Washoe

== Communities ==
Historical population
Census	Pop.	Note	%±
1960	85,311		—
1970	121,763		42.7%
1980	195,126		60.3%
1990	254,667		30.5%
2000	342,885		34.6%
2010	425,417		24.1%
2020	490,596		15.3%
U.S. Decennial Census

=== Cities ===
- Fallon (Combined Statistical Area)
- Fernley
- Reno (Principal city)
- Carson City (Combined Statistical Area)
- Sparks
- Yerington

=== Census-designated places ===
Note: All census-designated places are unincorporated.

- Cold Springs
- Crystal Bay
- Empire
- Gerlach
- Golden Valley
- Incline Village
- Lemmon Valley
- Mogul
- Nixon
- Spanish Springs
- Sun Valley
- Sutcliffe
- Verdi
- Virginia City
- Wadsworth

=== Unincorporated places ===
- Gold Hill
- New Washoe City
- Pleasant Valley
- Poeville
- Pyramid
- Vya

== Demographics ==
As of the 2010 census, there were 425,417 people, 165,187 households, and 103,909 families residing within the MSA. The racial makeup of the MSA was 77.0% White, 2.3% African American, 1.7% Native American, 5.1% Asian, 0.6% Pacific Islander, 9.4% some other race, and 3.8% from two or more races. Hispanic or Latino of any race were 22.1% of the population.

In 2011, the estimated median income for a household in the MSA was $50,768, and the median income for a family was $60,605. Males had a median income of $44,883 versus $35,560 for females. The per capita income for the MSA was $27,500.

County	Seat	2025 estimate	2020 Census	Change	Area	Density
Washoe	Reno	509,386	486,492	+4.71%	6,542 sq mi (16,940 km^{2})	78/sq mi (30/km^{2})
Lyon	Yerington	65,088	59,235	+9.88%	2,024 sq mi (5,240 km^{2})	32/sq mi (12/km^{2})
Storey	Virginia City	4,260	4,104	+3.80%	264 sq mi (680 km^{2})	16/sq mi (6/km^{2})
Total		578,734	549,831	+5.26%	8,830 sq mi (22,900 km^{2})	66/sq mi (25/km^{2})

== Combined Statistical Area ==
The Reno–Carson City–Gardnerville Ranchos, NV-CA Combined Statistical Area (CSA) is made up of six counties and one independent city, Carson City. The statistical area includes two metropolitan areas and two micropolitan areas. As of the 2010 Census, the CSA had a population of 579,668.

=== Components ===
- Metropolitan Statistical Areas (MSAs)
  - Reno (Washoe, Lyon, and Storey counties)
  - Carson City (Consolidated municipality/Independent city)
- Micropolitan Statistical Areas (μSAs)
  - Gardnerville Ranchos (Douglas and Alpine counties)
  - Fallon (Churchill County)

Statistical Area	2025 estimate	2020 Census	Change	Area	Density
Reno, NV Metropolitan Statistical Area	578,734	549,831	+5.26%	8,830 sq mi (22,900 km^{2})	66/sq mi (25/km^{2})
Carson City, NV Metropolitan Statistical Area	58,571	58,639	−0.12%	157 sq mi (410 km^{2})	373/sq mi (144/km^{2})
Gardnerville Ranchos, NV-CA Micropolitan Statistical Area	51,154	50,692	+0.91%	1,481 sq mi (3,840 km^{2})	34/sq mi (13/km^{2})
Fallon, NV Micropolitan Statistical Area	25,851	25,516	+1.31%	5,024 sq mi (13,010 km^{2})	5/sq mi (2/km^{2})
Total	714,310	684,678	+4.33%	15,492 sq mi (40,120 km^{2})	46/sq mi (18/km^{2})

== See also ==
- Nevada census statistical areas
- Reno (Nevada gaming area)
