= Nevada State Route 759 =

State highway in Nevada, United States

State Route 759
- Douglas County Airport Road
- SR 759 highlighted in red

Route information
- Maintained by NDOT
- Length: 1.004 mi (1.616 km)
- Existed: 1976–present

Major junctions
- West end: US 395 north of Minden
- East end: Heybourne Road north of Minden

Location
- Country: United States
- State: Nevada
- County: Douglas

Highway system
- Nevada State Highway System; Interstate; US; State; Pre‑1976; Scenic
← SR 758	→ SR 766

State Route 759 (SR 759) is a short state highway in Douglas County, Nevada serving the county's airport facility.

== Route description ==
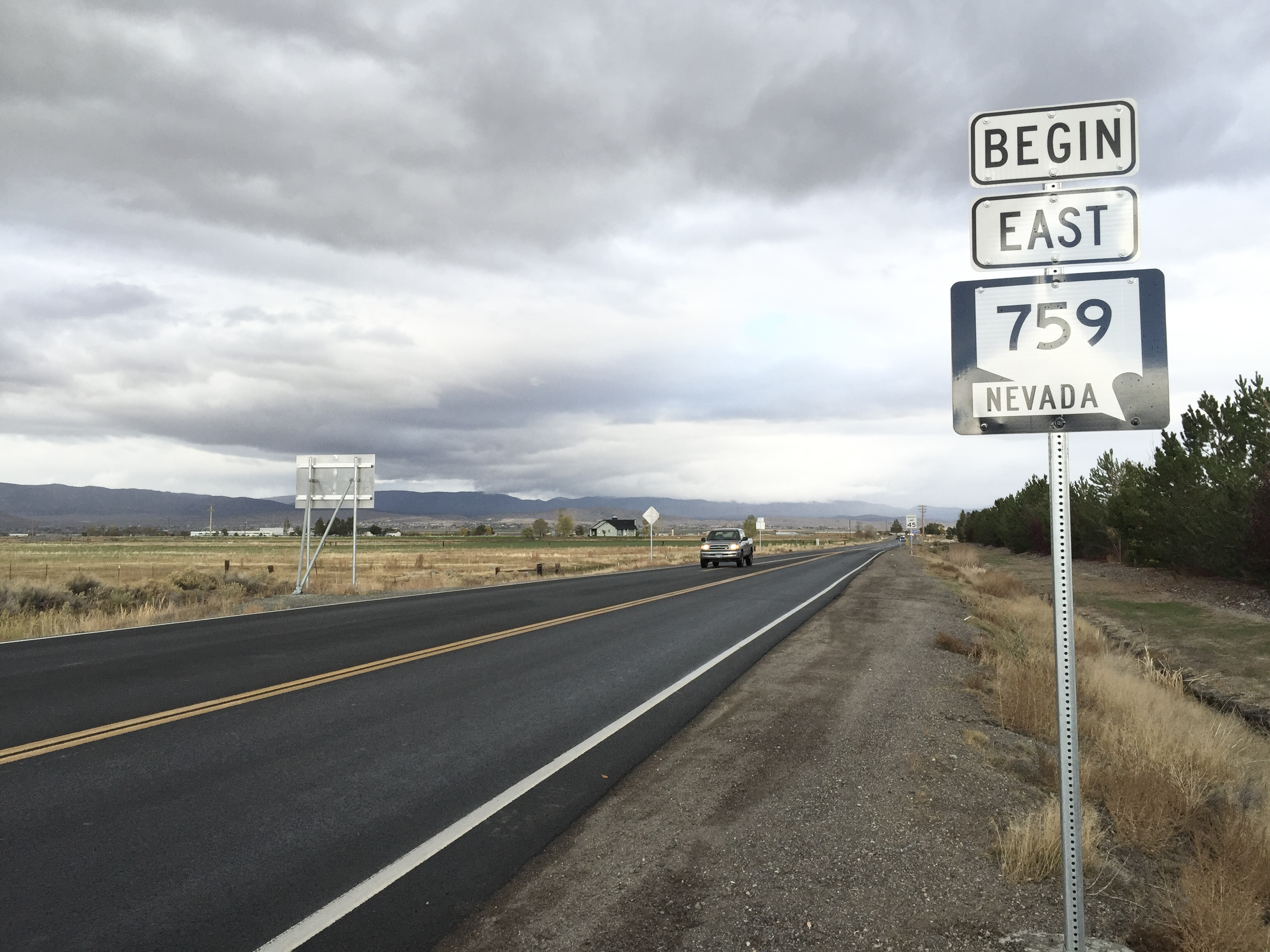
View at the west end of SR 759 looking eastbound

State Route 759 begins at U.S. Route 395, approximately 2 miles (3.2 km) north of the town limits of Minden in the Johnson Lane community. From there, the highway heads east along Airport Road past some farm fields and businesses. After traveling about 1 mile (1.6 km), SR 759 ends at the intersection of Heybourne Road, in front of the main entrance to the Minden–Tahoe Airport.

== History ==
SR 759 was designated during the 1976 renumbering of Nevada's state highway system on July 1, 1976. The change was first seen on state highway maps in 1991.

== Major intersections ==
The entire route is in Johnson Lane, Douglas County.

mi	km	Destinations	Notes
0.00	0.00	US 395 – Carson City, Minden	
1.00	1.61	Heybourne Road	Entrance to Minden–Tahoe Airport
1.000 mi = 1.609 km; 1.000 km = 0.621 mi
