= James Settelmeyer =

American politician (born 1971)

Minority Leader of the Nevada Senate
- In office November 7, 2018 – November 9, 2022
- Preceded by: Michael Roberson
- Succeeded by: Heidi Gansert

Member of the Nevada Senate from the 17th district
- In office November 3, 2010 – November 9, 2022
- Preceded by: Mark Amodei
- Succeeded by: Robin L. Titus

Member of the Nevada Assembly from the 39th district
- In office November 8, 2006 – November 3, 2010
- Preceded by: Lynn Hettrick
- Succeeded by: Kite Kelly

Personal details
- Born: March 6, 1971 (age 55) Carson City, Nevada, U.S.
- Party: Republican
- Spouse: Sherese (m. 2002–2021)
- Education: California Polytechnic State University, San Luis Obispo (BS); Concord Law School (attended)

James Settelmeyer (born March 6, 1971) is an American politician, formerly serving in the Nevada Senate. He represented Churchill, Douglas, Lyon County, and Storey County in Senate District 17.

== Early life and education ==
Settelmeyer was born in Carson City, a third generation Nevada rancher. His great-grandfather migrated to Gardnerville, Nevada in 1880 from Westphalia, Germany.

Settelmeyer is an agriculturalist and was educated at the California Polytechnic State University. He also took law courses at Concord Law School, but did not earn a degree.

== Career ==
Settelmeyer was first elected in 2006, and his first session was in 2007 where he was placed on the Commerce and Labor, Governmental Affairs, and Election Procedures & Constitutional Amendments committees. In the Interim James has been appointed to serve on the Senior and Veterans study committee.

Before being an elected representative he was the chairman of the Carson Valley Conservation District, as well as chairman of the Nevada State Conservation Commission.

Settelmeyer was appointed Chairman of District Nine of the Office of the National Ombudsman, Small Business Administration in October 2008. District Nine includes California, Nevada, Arizona, Hawaii and Guam.

He was appointed as natural resources director by the governor.

== Notes and references ==
Nevada Senate
Preceded by Michael Roberson	Minority Leader of the Nevada Senate; 2018–2022	Succeeded by Heidi Gansert
