= Nevada statistical areas =

Coordinates: 39.3289°N 116.6312°W

Nevada statistical areas refer to the 10 areas defined by the Office of Management and Budget covering the U.S. state of Nevada. Effective July 21, 2023, the OMB subdivides Nevada into two combined statistical areas, three metropolitan statistical areas, and five micropolitan statistical areas. The largest of these is the Las Vegas–Henderson, NV CSA, consisting of all of Clark and Nye counties with about 2.3 million out of the 3.3. million people in Nevada, according to the 2020 census. One of the areas, the Reno–Carson City–Garderville Ranchos, NV-CA CSA spans the region in Nevada and California around Lake Tahoe.

== Statistical areas ==
The Office of Management and Budget (OMB) has designated more than 1,000 statistical areas for the United States and Puerto Rico. These statistical areas are important geographic delineations of population clusters used by the OMB, the United States Census Bureau, planning organizations, and federal, state, and local government entities.

The OMB defines a core-based statistical area (commonly referred to as a CBSA) as the county or counties (or county-equivalents) surrounding at least one densely-settled core of at least 10,000 population, "plus adjacent counties having a high degree of social and economic integration with the core as measured through commuting ties with the counties containing the core". The OMB further divides core-based statistical areas based on population into metropolitan statistical areas (MSAs) for those with at least 50,000 and micropolitan statistical areas (μSAs) for those with 10,000 to 49,999 people.

The OMB defines a combined statistical area (CSA) as two or more adjacent core-based statistical areas where the employment interchange rate (% commuting from A to B plus % commuting from B to A) is at least 15%. The primary statistical areas (PSAs) include all combined statistical areas and any core-based statistical area that is not a constituent of a combined statistical area.

Statistical areas of the state of Nevada (updated 2025) (Note: An out-of-state area and its population are displayed in green. An area that extends into more than one state is displayed in purple. A purple population number over a black population number show the total population versus the in-state population.)
| Combined statistical area | 2025 population (est.) | Core-based statistical area | 2025 population (est.) | County | 2025 population (est.) |
|---|---|---|---|---|---|
| Las Vegas–Henderson, NV CSA | 2,449,629 | Las Vegas–Henderson-North Las Vegas, NV MSA | 2,407,226 | Clark County, Nevada | 2,407,226 |
| Las Vegas–Henderson, NV CSA | 2,449,629 | Pahrump, NV μSA | 57,336 | Nye County, Nevada | 57,336 |
| Reno-Carson City-Gardnerville Ranchos, NV-CA CSA | 714,310; 713,267 (NV) | Reno, NV MSA | 578,734 | Washoe County, Nevada | 509,386 |
| Reno-Carson City-Gardnerville Ranchos, NV-CA CSA | 714,310; 713,267 (NV) | Reno, NV MSA | 578,734 | Lyon County, Nevada | 65,088 |
| Reno-Carson City-Gardnerville Ranchos, NV-CA CSA | 714,310; 713,267 (NV) | Reno, NV MSA | 578,734 | Storey County, Nevada | 4,260 |
| Reno-Carson City-Gardnerville Ranchos, NV-CA CSA | 714,310; 713,267 (NV) | Carson City, NV MSA | 58,571 | Carson City, Nevada | 58,571 |
| Reno-Carson City-Gardnerville Ranchos, NV-CA CSA | 714,310; 713,267 (NV) | Gardnerville Ranchos, NV-CA μSA | 51,154; 50,111 (NV) | Douglas County, Nevada | 50,111 |
| Reno-Carson City-Gardnerville Ranchos, NV-CA CSA | 714,310; 713,267 (NV) | Gardnerville Ranchos, NV-CA μSA | 51,154; 50,111 (NV) | Alpine County, California | 1,043 |
| Reno-Carson City-Gardnerville Ranchos, NV-CA CSA | 714,310; 713,267 (NV) | Fallon, NV μSA | 25,851 | Churchill County, Nevada | 25,851 |
| none | | Elko, NV μSA | 56,682 | Elko County, Nevada | 54,815 |
| none | | Elko, NV μSA | 56,682 | Eureka County, Nevada | 1,867 |
| none | | Winnemucca, NV μSA | 17,267 | Humboldt County, Nevada | 17,267 |
| none | | none | | White Pine County, Nevada | 8,534 |
| none | | none | | Pershing County, Nevada | 6,421 |
| none | | none | | Lander County, Nevada | 5,872 |
| none | | none | | Mineral County, Nevada | 4,407 |
| none | | none | | Lincoln County, Nevada | 4,320 |
| none | | none | | Esmeralda County, Nevada | 729 |
| State of Nevada | | | | | 3,282,061 |

Core-based statistical areas (CBSAs) of Nevada (Note: For CBSAs comprising populations from multiple states, they are listed twice to show both their intrastate population within that CBSA as well as the CBSA's total population. Only the intrastate population is ranked.)
| 2025 rank | Core-based statistical area | Population | | | | |
| 2025 rank | Core-based statistical area | 2025 estimate | Change | 2020 Census | Change | 2010 Census |
|---|---|---|---|---|---|---|
| 1 | Las Vegas-Henderson-North Las Vegas, NV MSA | 2,407,226 | +6.26% | 2,265,461 | +16.10% | 1,951,269 |
| 2 | Reno, NV MSA | 578,734 | +5.26% | 549,831 | +15.17% | 477,397 |
| 3 | Carson City, NV MSA | 58,571 | −0.12% | 58,639 | +6.09% | 55,274 |
| 4 | Pahrump, NV μSA | 57,336 | +11.14% | 51,591 | +17.40% | 43,946 |
| 5 | Elko, NV μSA | 56,682 | +2.02% | 55,557 | +9.35% | 50,805 |
| 6 | Gardnerville Ranchos, NV-CA μSA | 50,111 | +1.26% | 49,488 | +5.30% | 46,997 |
| 7 | Fallon, NV μSA | 25,851 | +1.31% | 25,516 | +2.57% | 24,877 |
| 8 | Winnemucca, NV μSA | 17,267 | −0.10% | 17,285 | +4.58% | 16,528 |
| | Gardnerville Ranchos, NV-CA μSA | 51,154 | +0.91% | 50,692 | +5.23% | 48,172 |

Combined statistical areas (CSAs) of Nevada (Note: For CSAs comprising populations from multiple states, they are listed twice to show both their intrastate population within that CSA as well as the CSA's total population. Only the intrastate population is ranked.)
| 2025 rank | Combined statistical area | Population | | | | |
| 2025 rank | Combined statistical area | 2025 estimate | Change | 2020 Census | Change | 2010 Census |
|---|---|---|---|---|---|---|
| 1 | Las Vegas-Henderson, NV CSA | 2,449,629 | +5.72% | 2,317,052 | +16.13% | 1,995,215 |
| 2 | Reno-Carson City-Gardnerville Ranchos, NV-CA CSA (NV) | 713,267 | +4.36% | 683,474 | +13.06% | 604,545 |
| | Reno-Carson City-Gardnerville Ranchos, NV-CA CSA | 714,310 | +4.33% | 684,678 | +13.04% | 605,720 |

== See also ==
- Geography of Nevada
  - Demographics of Nevada
