= Tahoe Airport =

Tahoe Airport may refer to:

- Reno-Tahoe International Airport in Reno, Nevada, United States (FAA: RNO)
- Minden–Tahoe Airport in Minden, Nevada, United States (FAA: MEV)
- Truckee-Tahoe Airport in Truckee, California, United States (FAA: TRK)
- Lake Tahoe Airport in South Lake Tahoe, California, United States (FAA: TVL)
