= East Valley =

East Valley may refer to a location in the United States:

- East Valley (Phoenix metropolitan area), the east side of the Phoenix metropolitan area in Arizona
- East Valley, Nevada, a census-designated place
- East Valley School District (Spokane), a school district in Spokane, Washington
- East Valley Township, Marshall County, Minnesota
- East San Jose, a neighborhood in San Jose, California
