= Skyland, Nevada =

- Census-designated place
- Location of Skyland, Nevada
- Coordinates: 39°1′20″N 119°56′33″W
- Country: United States
- State: Nevada

Area
  - Total: 4.46 sq mi (11.54 km^{2})
  - Land: 4.36 sq mi (11.28 km^{2})
  - Water: 0.10 sq mi (0.26 km^{2})
- Elevation: 6,260 ft (1,910 m)

Population (2020)
  - Total: 328
  - Density: 75.3/sq mi (29.07/km^{2})
- Time zone: UTC-8 (Pacific (PST))
  - Summer (DST): UTC-7 (PDT)
- Area code: 775
- FIPS code: 32-67600
- GNIS feature ID: 2583957

Skyland is a census-designated place (CDP) in Douglas County, Nevada, United States. As of the 2020 census, Skyland had a population of 328.

== Geography ==
Skyland is located on the east shore of Lake Tahoe in far western Nevada. U.S. Route 50 is the main road through the CDP, leading south 5 miles (8 km) to the California state line and northeast 20 miles (32 km) to Carson City. Lakeridge is immediately to the north, and Zephyr Cove borders Skyland to the south.

According to the United States Census Bureau, the Skyland CDP has a total area of 4.4 square miles (11.5 km^{2}), of which 4.4 square miles (11.3 km^{2}) is land and 0.12 square miles (0.3 km^{2}), or 2.26%, is water.

== Demographics ==
Historical population
Census	Pop.	Note	%±
2010	376		—
2020	328		−12.8%
U.S. Decennial Census
