= Carson Valley Times =

American online newspaper

- Type: Daily newspaper
- Format: Digest Magazine, Digital Print
- Editor: Joey Crandall
- Founded: July 2013; 13 years ago
- Ceased publication: September 2017; 8 years ago
- Headquarters: Gardnerville, Nevada
- Price: Free Distribution
- Website: www.carsonvalleytimes.com

The Carson Valley Times (CVT) was an American daily online newspaper and group of journalistic publications, published in Gardnerville, Nevada from July 2013 through September 2017. It was one of three newspapers published in the Carson Valley along with the Record-Courier and the Sierra Scoop. It was a member of the Nevada Press Association.

== History ==
The Carson Valley Times was founded by journalist Joey Crandall in July 2013 after leaving a 10-year career at the Gardnerville-based Record-Courier newspaper.

== Content ==
The publication focused on visual imagery, human interest stories and pieces on the inner workings of area events and organizations. It covered Gardnerville, Minden, and Genoa, Nevada, as well as the surrounding Sierra Nevada region.

== Publications ==
- CarsonValleyTimes.com Online – local news, sports & entertainment
- Carson Valley Living – lifestyle features magazine
- GameDay – weekly sports magazine

== Recognition ==
It received several Nevada Press Association Awards in 2015, including Best Web Site, Community division; Best News Photo Coverage, Community division (Ron Harpin); Best Sports Photo (Ron Harpin); Best Sports Feature, Community division (Joey Crandall) and Best In-depth/Investigative Series, Community division (Scott Neuffer).
