= Logan Creek, Nevada =

- Census-designated place
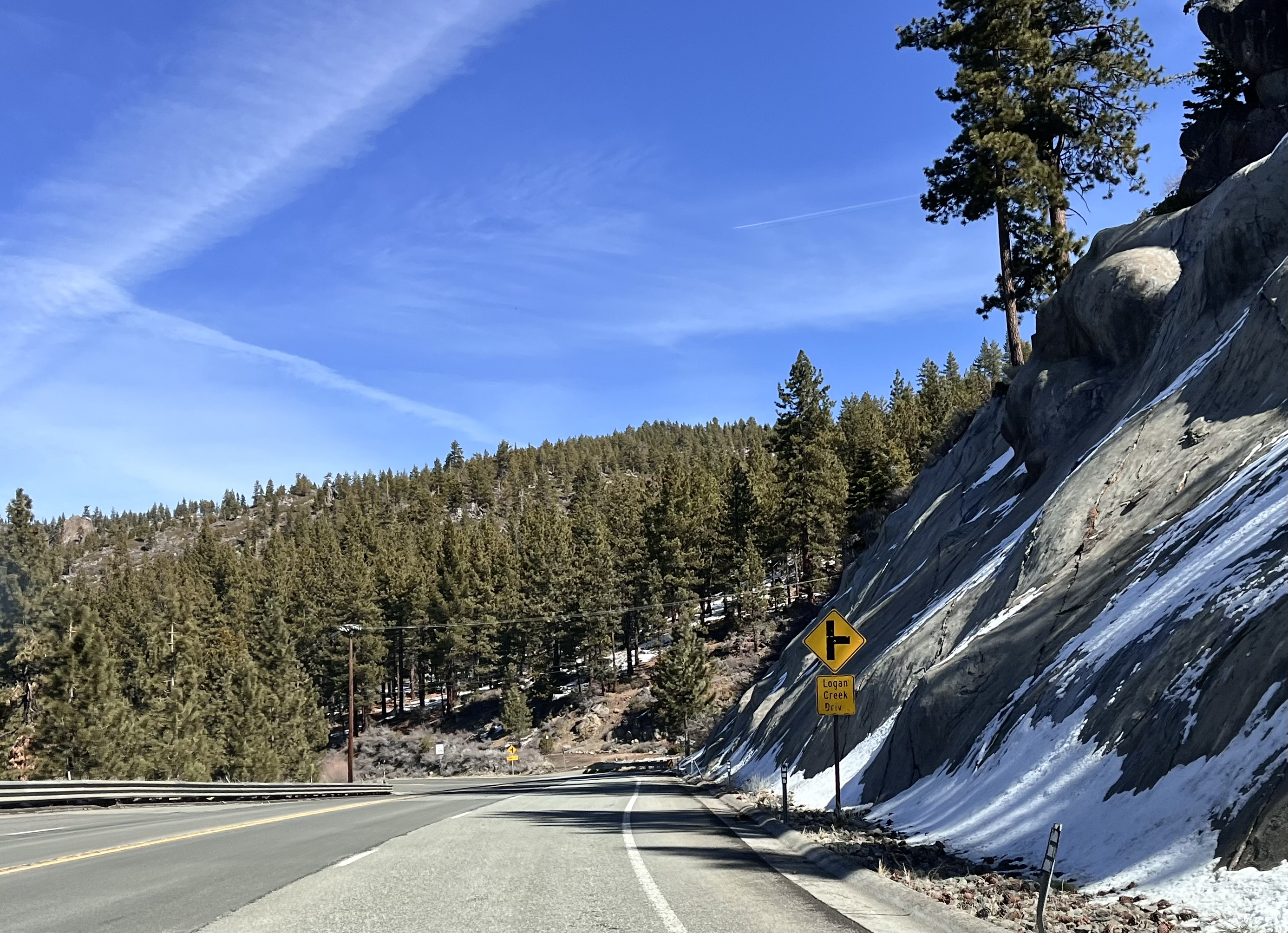

- Location of Logan Creek, Nevada
- Coordinates: 39°3′55″N 119°56′34″W
- Country: United States
- State: Nevada

Area
  - Total: 1.81 sq mi (4.68 km^{2})
  - Land: 1.75 sq mi (4.54 km^{2})
  - Water: 0.054 sq mi (0.14 km^{2})
- Elevation: 7,097 ft (2,163 m)

Population (2020)
  - Total: 40
  - Density: 22.8/sq mi (8.81/km^{2})
- Time zone: UTC-8 (Pacific (PST))
  - Summer (DST): UTC-7 (PDT)
- ZIP code: 89413
- Area code: 775
- FIPS code: 32-42350
- GNIS feature ID: 2583939

Logan Creek is a census-designated place (CDP) on the east shore of Lake Tahoe in Douglas County, Nevada, United States. As of the 2020 census, Logan Creek had a population of 40.

== Geography ==
Logan Creek is located along U.S. Route 50, north of Lakeridge and south of Glenbrook. It is 16 miles (26 km) east along US-50 to Carson City. According to the United States Census Bureau, the CDP has a total area of 1.8 square miles (4.7 km^{2}), of which 1.7 square miles (4.5 km^{2}) is land and 0.039 square miles (0.1 km^{2}), or 3.06%, is water.

== Demographics ==
Historical population
Census	Pop.	Note	%±
2010	26		—
2020	40		53.8%
U.S. Decennial Census
