= Elko micropolitan area =

Elko, Nevada Micropolitan Statistical Area
- Micropolitan Statistical Area
Interactive Map of Elko, NV μSA
Elko, NV μSA
- Country: United States
- States: Nevada
- Time zone: UTC−8 (PST)
  - Summer (DST): UTC−7 (PDT)

The Elko Micropolitan Statistical Area is a two county (Elko, Eureka) Nevada statistical area of 21,383 sq mi (55,380 km^{2}). The area includes portions of the Humboldt River Basin (~9,000 sq mi), the Snake River Basin (6,800), and the Central Nevada Desert Basins subregion (5,500).

== Demographics ==
As of the census of 2000, there were 46,942 people (48,594 as of the 2010 Census), and in 2000 there were 16,304 households, and 11,933 families residing within the μSA. The racial makeup of the μSA was 82.30% White, 0.58% African American, 5.17% Native American, 0.68% Asian, 0.11% Pacific Islander, 8.35% from other races, and 2.80% from two or more races. Hispanic or Latino of any race were 19.37% of the population.

The median income for a household in the USA was $44,900, and the median income for a family was $50,822. Males had a median income of $43,245 versus $24,827 for females. The per capita income for the USA was $76,027.
