= Osino, Nevada =

- Census-designated place
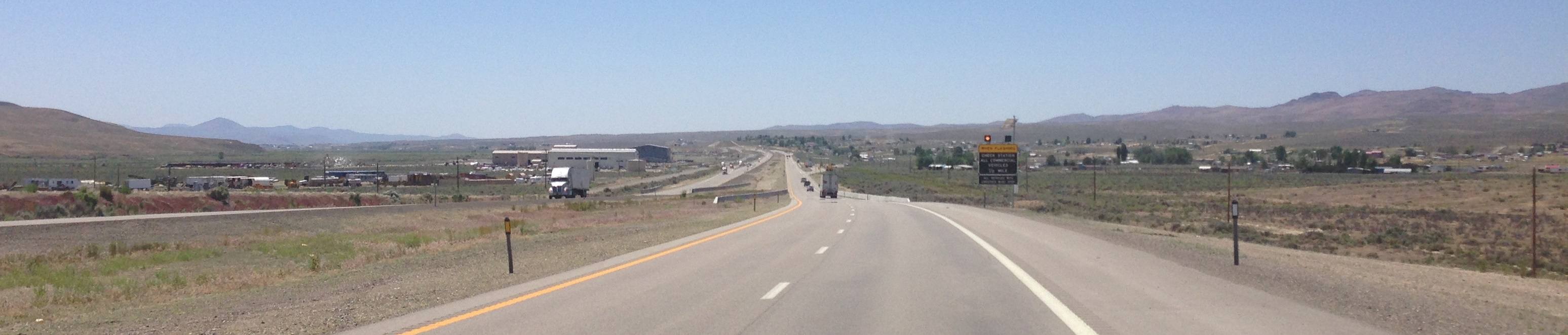
- View west along Interstate 80 in Osino, June 2014

- Location within Nevada
- Coordinates: 40°56′27″N 115°39′39″W
- Country: United States
- State: Nevada
- County: Elko

Area
  - Total: 2.58 sq mi (6.67 km^{2})
  - Land: 2.58 sq mi (6.67 km^{2})
  - Water: 0 sq mi (0.00 km^{2})
- Elevation: 5,158 ft (1,572 m)

Population (2020)
  - Total: 668
  - Density: 259/sq mi (100.1/km^{2})
- Time zone: UTC-8 (Pacific (PST))
  - Summer (DST): UTC-7 (PDT)
- ZIP Code: 89801
- Area code: 775
- FIPS code: 32-53200
- GNIS feature ID: 2583948

Osino is a census-designated place (CDP) along the Humboldt River in central Elko County, Nevada, United States. As of the 2020 census, Osino had a population of 668.

== Geography ==
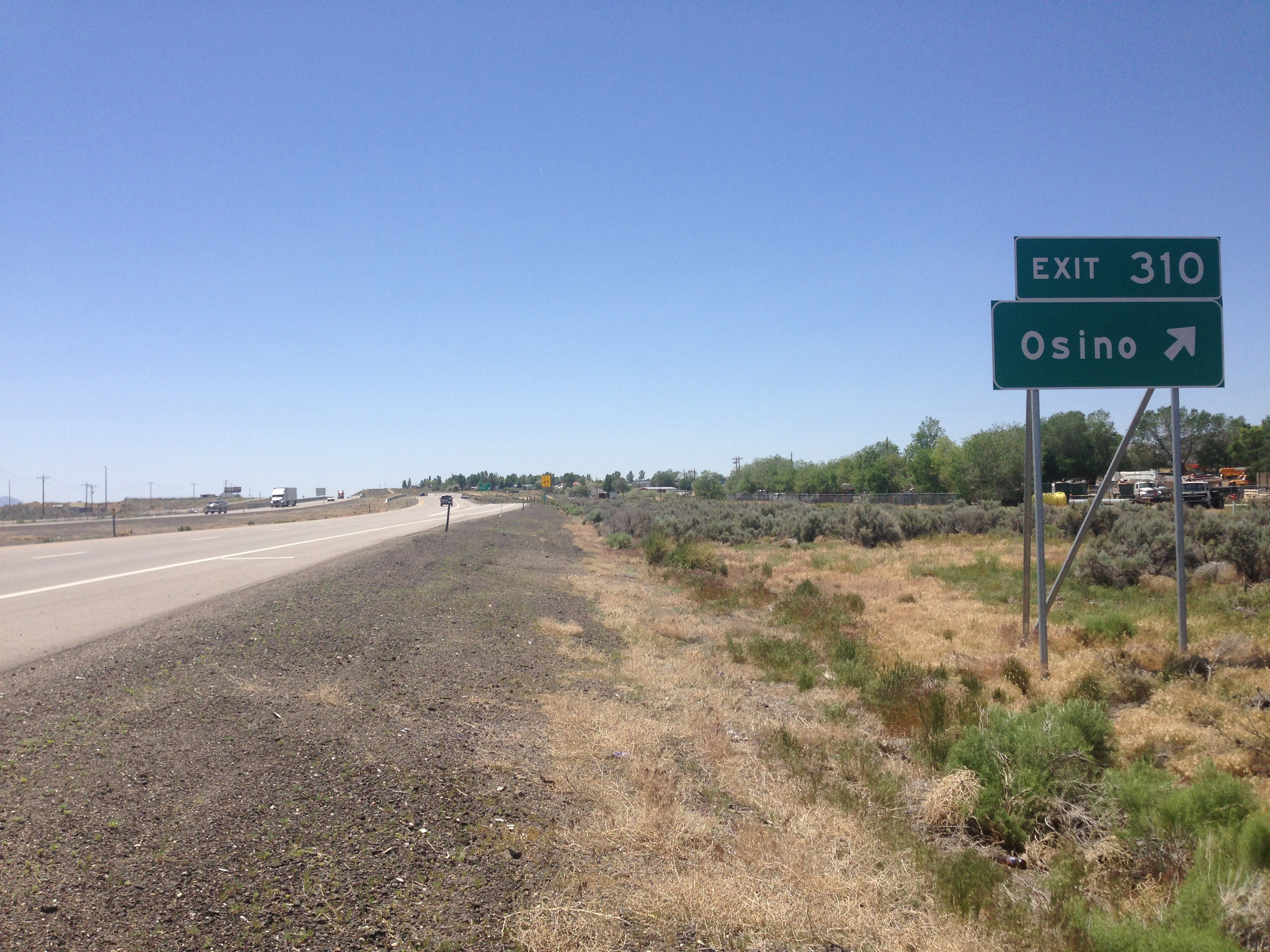
Westbound Interstate 80 in Osino, June 2014

Osino is located on Interstate 80 (Exit 310) on the northern foothills of two mountain ranges: the Elko Hills (on the south) and the Adobe Range (on the west). It is 9 miles (14 km) northeast of Elko and 41 miles (66 km) southwest of Wells.

== Demographics ==
Historical population
Census	Pop.	Note	%±
2020	668		—
U.S. Decennial Census

== See also ==
- List of census-designated places in Nevada
