= Tahoe Transportation District =

Mass transportation agency in the Lake Tahoe region

- Headquarters: 128 Market St.
- Locale: Stateline, Nevada
- Service area: Lake Tahoe vicinity
- Service type: bus service, paratransit
- Routes: 10
- Fleet: 28 Buses
- Operator: 8
- Website: Tahoe Transportation District

The Tahoe Transportation District, formally known as South Tahoe Area Transit Authority and BlueGO, is the primary provider of mass transportation in the Lake Tahoe region of northcentral California and northwestern Nevada. The service uniquely provides 24-hour-per-day service, with fixed routes functioning from 5:45 am to 1:45 am and flexible night owl service operating in the short remaining hours. Park and ride locations are available for intercity service in Carson City, Stateline, and Gardnerville, Nevada. The agency also operates various shuttles during peak ski season. This transportation service is now known as, Tahoe Transportation District.

Tahoe Transportation District is governed by 16 member board from governing agencies in both California and Nevada

Tahoe Transportation coordinates with Douglas Area Rural Transit to allow transfers within Minden Nevada.

== History ==
In 2018, Tahoe Transportation District discontinued its ski shuttles due to the lack of staff and insufficient funding

In July 2024, Tahoe Transportation District, received a 7.9 Million dollar grant to replace its aging bus fleet is Hybrid buses

=== Bankruptcy ===
In November 2010, South Lake Tahoe Area Transit Authority was taken over by Tahoe Transportation District due to bankruptcy

Original Logo for South Lake Tahoe Area Transit under the bluego brand

== Routes ==
- 19X Gardnerville to Carson City
- 22 Stateline Transit Center to Douglas County Community/Senior Center
- 28 East Shore Express - Is a seasonal route from Incline Village to Stateline. Year round service is from Stateline to Minden
- 50 South Y Transit Center to Stateline Transit Center
- 55 South Y Transit Center to Kingsburg Transit Center
