= Fish Springs, Nevada =

- Census-designated place
- Location of Fish Springs, Nevada
- Coordinates: 38°56′49″N 119°38′52″W
- Country: United States
- State: Nevada

Area
  - Total: 9.19 sq mi (23.81 km^{2})
  - Land: 9.19 sq mi (23.81 km^{2})
  - Water: 0 sq mi (0.00 km^{2})
- Elevation: 5,184 ft (1,580 m)

Population (2020)
  - Total: 684
  - Density: 74.4/sq mi (28.73/km^{2})
- Time zone: UTC-8 (Pacific (PST))
  - Summer (DST): UTC-7 (PDT)
- Area code: 775
- FIPS code: 32-25000
- GNIS feature ID: 2583923

Fish Springs is a census-designated place (CDP) in Douglas County, Nevada, United States. As of the 2020 census, Fish Springs had a population of 684.

== Geography ==
Fish Springs is on the east side of the Carson Valley of western Nevada, 7 miles (11 km) east of Minden, the Douglas County seat. According to the United States Census Bureau, the CDP has a total area of 9.2 square miles (23.8 km^{2}), all of it land.

== Demographics ==
Historical population
| Census | Pop. | Note | %± |
|---|---|---|---|
| 2010 | 648 | | — |
| 2020 | 684 | | 5.6% |
U.S. Decennial Census
