= Double Spring, Nevada =

- Census-designated place
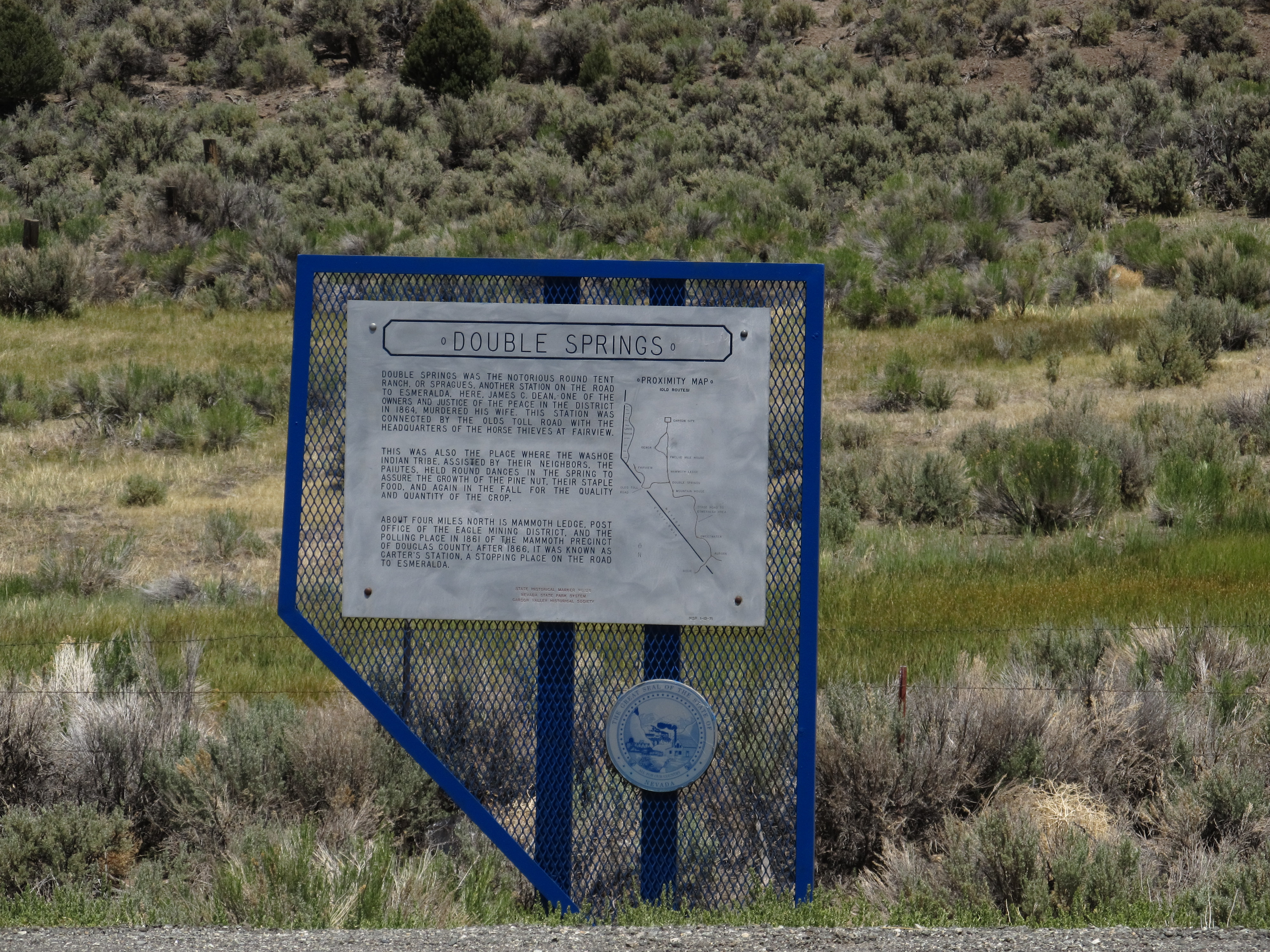

- Location of Double Spring, Nevada
- Coordinates: 38°46′33″N 119°35′18″W
- Country: United States
- State: Nevada

Area
  - Total: 8.76 sq mi (22.70 km^{2})
  - Land: 8.76 sq mi (22.70 km^{2})
  - Water: 0 sq mi (0.00 km^{2})
- Elevation: 6,624 ft (2,019 m)

Population (2020)
  - Total: 180
  - Density: 20.5/sq mi (7.93/km^{2})
- Time zone: UTC-8 (Pacific (PST))
  - Summer (DST): UTC-7 (PDT)
- ZIP code: 89410
- Area code: 775
- FIPS code: 32-19150
- GNIS feature ID: 2583917

Double Spring is a census-designated place (CDP) in Douglas County, Nevada, United States. As of the 2020 census, Double Spring had a population of 180.

== Geography ==
Double Spring is located 16 miles (26 km) southeast of Minden on the west side of U.S. Route 395. According to the United States Census Bureau, the CDP has a total area of 8.8 square miles (22.7 km^{2}), all of it land.

== Demographics ==
Historical population
Census	Pop.	Note	%±
2010	158		—
2020	180		13.9%
U.S. Decennial Census
