= Carter Springs, Nevada =

- Census-designated place
- Location of Carter Springs, Nevada
- Coordinates: 38°51′46″N 119°39′12″W
- Country: United States
- State: Nevada

Area
  - Total: 2.80 sq mi (7.25 km^{2})
  - Land: 2.80 sq mi (7.25 km^{2})
  - Water: 0 sq mi (0.00 km^{2})
- Elevation: 5,522 ft (1,683 m)

Population (2020)
  - Total: 585
  - Density: 208.9/sq mi (80.67/km^{2})
- Time zone: UTC-8 (Pacific (PST))
  - Summer (DST): UTC-7 (PDT)
- ZIP code: 89410
- Area code: 775
- FIPS code: 32-10200
- GNIS feature ID: 2583913

Carter Springs is a census-designated place (CDP) in Douglas County, Nevada, United States. As of the 2020 census, Carter Springs had a population of 585.

== Geography ==
Carter Springs is 9 miles (14 km) southeast of Minden on the north side of U.S. Route 395. According to the United States Census Bureau, the CDP has a total area of 2.8 square miles (7.3 km^{2}), all of it land.

== Demographics ==
Historical population
Census	Pop.	Note	%±
2010	553		—
2020	585		5.8%
U.S. Decennial Census
