= Minden–Tahoe Airport =

Airport in Nevada, US

- IATA: MEV; ICAO: KMEV; FAA LID: MEV

Summary
- Airport type: Public
- Owner: Douglas County
- Serves: Minden, Nevada
- Elevation AMSL: 4,722 ft / 1,439 m
- Coordinates: 39°00′03″N 119°45′07″W
- Interactive map of Minden–Tahoe Airport

Runways
Direction	Length		Surface
Direction	ft	m	Surface
16/34	7,399	2,255	Asphalt
12/30	5,299	1,615	Asphalt
12G/30G	2,050	625	Dirt

Statistics (2023)
- Aircraft operations (year ending 5/10/2023): 90,920
- Based aircraft: 272
- Source: Federal Aviation Administration

Minden–Tahoe Airport (IATA: MEV, ICAO: KMEV, FAA LID: MEV) is a general aviation airport serving the Carson Valley in Douglas County, Nevada, United States, including the towns of Minden, Gardnerville and Genoa, Nevada; and Lake Tahoe to the west. The airport is about five miles north of Minden. It is home to the Sierra Front Interagency Dispatch Center and regional firefighting air tanker base.

The airport is a mecca for soaring, and many North American and world records have been flown out of Minden in the many gliders that it hosts.

Gliders are usually towed to altitudes of 1,000 to 2,000 ft (300 to 610 m) over the airport, and they are often able to make out and return flights to the White Mountains, Owens Valley, and Eastern Nevada, often covering distances of over 500 mi (800 km).

During winter months the famous Sierra mountain wave can carry gliders well over 25,000 ft (7,600 m), with the Minden record well over 40,000 ft (12,000 m).

A non-fatal mid-air collision near the Pine Nuts range between a glider and a small jet at 16,000 ft (4,900 m) has heightened the awareness for all airplanes flying in the area that both types of aircraft need to watch for each other.

The airport is undergoing an expansion plan where glider operations will be moved to the east side of the airport.

Minden–Tahoe Airport is the base for the "Introduction to Soaring" tutorial mission supplied with Microsoft Flight Simulator X.

== Facilities ==
Minden–Tahoe Airport covers 996 acres (403 ha) at an elevation of 4,722 ft (1,439 m). It has two asphalt runways: 16/34 is 7,399 by 100 ft (2,255 by 30 m) and 12/30 is 5,299 by 75 ft (1,615 by 23 m). A glider runway (12G/30G) has 2,050 by 60 ft (625 by 18 m) of dirt.

In the year ending May 10, 2023 the airport had 90,920 aircraft operations, average 249 per day: 96% general aviation, 3% air taxi, and less than 1% military. 272 aircraft were then based at the airport: 141 single-engine, 22 multi-engine, 6 jet, 8 helicopter, 94 glider and 1 ultralight.

== Airshow ==
Minden-Tahoe hosts the Aviation Roundup, an annual event usually held in the fall. In 2016 and 2017, the airshow was headlined by the United States Air Force Thunderbirds demonstration team. The 2018 airshow featured the United States Navy Blue Angels.

== See also ==
- List of airports in Nevada
