= Douglas Area Rural Transit =

Nevada public transportation operator

- Parent: Douglas County
- Founded: 2001
- Headquarters: 1329 Waterloo Lane Gardnerville
- Locale: Carson Valley
- Service area: Rural Douglas County
- Service type: Bus; Paratransit
- Routes: 1 Fixed Route
- Destinations: Minden, Gardnerville, Gardnerville Ranchos
- Annual ridership: 15,453 (2022)
- Website: https://communityservices.douglascountynv.gov/senior_services/transportation/dart_

Douglas Area Rural Transit is a public transportation operator in Douglas County. Douglas Area Rural Transit operates in the rural communities of Minden, Gardnerville and the Gardnerville Ranchos. It offers both dial-a-ride and fix route transit service known as DART Express

== History ==
Douglas Area Rural Transit was incorporated in 2001 using Nevada's DOT public rural ride program as a way to bridge the transit gap in Carson Valley and Stateline. At launch, the system was averaging 40 passengers per day

In 2007, Gardnerville residents were protesting the transit operator for causing traffic in residential streets near the senior center
