= Topaz Ranch Estates, Nevada =

- Census-designated place
- Nickname: (TRE)
- Location of Topaz Ranch Estates, Nevada
- Coordinates: 38°43′59″N 119°30′25″W
- Country: United States
- State: Nevada

Area
  - Total: 14.39 sq mi (37.27 km^{2})
  - Land: 14.39 sq mi (37.27 km^{2})
  - Water: 0 sq mi (0.00 km^{2})
- Elevation: 5,140 ft (1,570 m)

Population (2020)
  - Total: 1,630
  - Density: 113.3/sq mi (43.73/km^{2})
- Time zone: UTC-8 (Pacific (PST))
  - Summer (DST): UTC-7 (PDT)
- Area code: 775
- FIPS code: 32-74400
- GNIS feature ID: 2583959

Topaz Ranch Estates is a census-designated place (CDP) in Douglas County, Nevada, United States. As of the 2020 census, Topaz Ranch Estates had a population of 1,630.

== Geography ==
Topaz Ranch Estates is located in southern Douglas County, along Nevada State Route 208. It is 8 miles (13 km) east to Wellington and 3 miles (5 km) west to U.S. Route 395 at Holbrook Junction.

According to the United States Census Bureau, the Topaz Ranch Estates CDP has an area of 14.4 square miles (37.3 km^{2}), all land.

== Demographics ==
Historical population
Census	Pop.	Note	%±
2010	1,501		—
2020	1,630		8.6%
U.S. Decennial Census
