= Fallon Station, Nevada =

- CDP
- Location of Fallon Station, Nevada
- Coordinates: 39°25′4″N 118°43′32″W
- Country: United States
- State: Nevada
- County: Churchill

Area
  - Total: 2.84 sq mi (7.36 km^{2})
  - Land: 2.84 sq mi (7.36 km^{2})
  - Water: 0 sq mi (0.00 km^{2})
- Elevation: 3,927 ft (1,197 m)

Population (2020)
  - Total: 281
  - Density: 98.9/sq mi (38.17/km^{2})
- Time zone: UTC-8 (Pacific (PST))
  - Summer (DST): UTC-7 (PDT)
- Zip Code: 89496
- FIPS code: 32-24500
- GNIS feature ID: 2408115

Fallon Station is a census-designated place (CDP) in Churchill County, Nevada, United States. As of the 2020 census, Fallon Station had a population of 281.

== Geography ==
According to the United States Census Bureau, the CDP has a total area of 2.5 square miles (6.5 km^{2}), all of it land.

== Demographics ==
Historical population
Census	Pop.	Note	%±
1970	1,045		—
1980	1,256		20.2%
1990	1,092		−13.1%
2000	1,265		15.8%
2010	705		−44.3%
2020	281		−60.1%
U.S. Decennial Census

As of the census of 2000, there were 1,265 people, 358 households, and 356 families residing in the CDP. The population density was 509.5 inhabitants per square mile (196.7/km^{2}). There were 360 housing units at an average density of 145.0 per square mile (56.0/km^{2}). The racial makeup of the CDP was 69.64% White, 8.70% African American, 1.42% Native American, 8.62% Asian, 0.95% Pacific Islander, 5.38% from other races, and 5.30% from two or more races. Hispanic or Latino of any race were 10.75% of the population.

There were 358 households, out of which 83.2% had children under the age of 18 living with them, 93.9% were married couples living together, 4.5% had a female householder with no husband present, and 0.3% were non-families. No households were made up of individuals, and none had someone living alone who was 65 years of age or older. The average household size was 3.53 and the average family size was 3.51.

In the CDP, the population was spread out, with 43.6% under the age of 18, 12.6% from 18 to 24, 42.4% from 25 to 44, 1.3% from 45 to 64, and 0.1% who were 65 years of age or older. The median age was 22 years. For every 100 females, there were 102.1 males. For every 100 females age 18 and over, there were 98.6 males.

The median income for a household in the CDP was $34,236, and the median income for a family was $31,688. Males had a median income of $26,230 versus $21,290 for females. The per capita income for the CDP was $11,719. About 2.5% of families and 4.7% of the population were below the poverty line, including 2.9% of those under age 18 and none of those age 65 or over.
