= East Valley, Nevada =

- Census-designated place
- Location of East Valley, Nevada
- Coordinates: 38°56′13″N 119°42′1″W
- Country: United States
- State: Nevada

Area
  - Total: 9.96 sq mi (25.80 km^{2})
  - Land: 9.84 sq mi (25.48 km^{2})
  - Water: 0.12 sq mi (0.32 km^{2})
- Elevation: 4,892 ft (1,491 m)

Population (2020)
  - Total: 1,558
  - Density: 158.4/sq mi (61.15/km^{2})
- Time zone: UTC-8 (Pacific (PST))
  - Summer (DST): UTC-7 (PDT)
- Area code: 775
- FIPS code: 32-21520
- GNIS feature ID: 2583920

East Valley is a census-designated place (CDP) in Douglas County, Nevada, United States. As of the 2020 census, East Valley had a population of 1,558.

== Geography ==
East Valley is located directly east of Gardnerville on the east side of the Carson Valley in western Nevada. According to the United States Census Bureau, the CDP has a total area of 9.5 square miles (24.7 km^{2}), of which 9.4 square miles (24.4 km^{2}) is land and 0.12 square miles (0.3 km^{2}), or 1.29%, is water.

== Demographics ==
Historical population
Census	Pop.	Note	%±
2010	1,474		—
2020	1,558		5.7%
U.S. Decennial Census
