= Ruhenstroth, Nevada =

- Census-designated place
- Location of Ruhenstroth, Nevada
- Coordinates: 38°53′6″N 119°41′14″W
- Country: United States
- State: Nevada

Area
  - Total: 2.83 sq mi (7.34 km^{2})
  - Land: 2.83 sq mi (7.34 km^{2})
  - Water: 0 sq mi (0.00 km^{2})
- Elevation: 4,981 ft (1,518 m)

Population (2020)
  - Total: 1,239
  - Density: 437.4/sq mi (168.87/km^{2})
- Time zone: UTC-8 (Pacific (PST))
  - Summer (DST): UTC-7 (PDT)
- ZIP codes: 89410
- Area code: 775
- FIPS code: 32-63450
- GNIS feature ID: 2583955

Ruhenstroth is a census-designated place (CDP) in Douglas County, Nevada, United States. As of the 2020 census, Ruhenstroth had a population of 1,239.

== Geography ==
Ruhenstroth is located 6 miles (10 km) southeast of Minden, the Douglas County seat, along U.S. Route 395. According to the United States Census Bureau, Ruhenstroth has a total area of 2.8 square miles (7.3 km^{2}), all land.

== Demographics ==
Historical population
Census	Pop.	Note	%±
2010	1,293		—
2020	1,239		−4.2%
U.S. Decennial Census
