= Gardnerville Ranchos, Nevada =

- Census-designated place
- Location of Gardnerville Ranchos, Nevada
- Coordinates: 38°53′45″N 119°44′4″W
- Country: United States
- State: Nevada
- County: Douglas

Area
  - Total: 10.32 sq mi (26.74 km^{2})
  - Land: 10.32 sq mi (26.74 km^{2})
  - Water: 0 sq mi (0.00 km^{2})
- Elevation: 4,859 ft (1,481 m)

Population (2020)
  - Total: 11,318
  - Density: 1,096.2/sq mi (423.24/km^{2})
- Time zone: UTC−8 (Pacific (PST))
  - Summer (DST): UTC−7 (PDT)
- FIPS code: 32-26500
- GNIS feature ID: 1867346

Gardnerville Ranchos is a census-designated place in Douglas County, Nevada, United States. As of the 2020 census, the population was 11,318. The area is the namesake for the Gardnerville Ranchos Micropolitan Statistical area which includes other areas of Douglas County.

== Geography ==
According to the United States Census Bureau, the CDP has a total area of 14.7 square miles (38 km^{2}), all of it land.

=== Climate ===
According to the Köppen climate classification, Gardnerville Ranchos has a warm-summer Mediterranean climate (abbreviated Csb).

Climate data for Gardnerville Ranchos, 1991–2020 simulated normals (4843 ft elevation)
Month	Jan	Feb	Mar	Apr	May	Jun	Jul	Aug	Sep	Oct	Nov	Dec	Year
Mean daily maximum °F (°C)	47.5 (8.6)	51.1 (10.6)	57.6 (14.2)	62.4 (16.9)	71.1 (21.7)	81.3 (27.4)	90.1 (32.3)	89.4 (31.9)	82.4 (28.0)	70.9 (21.6)	57.0 (13.9)	46.6 (8.1)	67.3 (19.6)
Daily mean °F (°C)	34.0 (1.1)	37.0 (2.8)	42.3 (5.7)	46.6 (8.1)	54.3 (12.4)	62.4 (16.9)	69.8 (21.0)	68.5 (20.3)	61.7 (16.5)	51.4 (10.8)	40.6 (4.8)	33.3 (0.7)	50.2 (10.1)
Mean daily minimum °F (°C)	20.3 (−6.5)	23.0 (−5.0)	27.1 (−2.7)	30.7 (−0.7)	37.4 (3.0)	43.5 (6.4)	49.5 (9.7)	47.8 (8.8)	41.0 (5.0)	32.0 (0.0)	24.3 (−4.3)	19.9 (−6.7)	33.0 (0.6)
Average precipitation inches (mm)	1.96 (49.66)	1.67 (42.46)	1.38 (35.05)	0.66 (16.83)	0.64 (16.32)	0.36 (9.22)	0.24 (5.97)	0.27 (6.76)	0.24 (6.11)	0.69 (17.43)	1.01 (25.78)	1.90 (48.36)	11.02 (279.95)
Average dew point °F (°C)	20.8 (−6.2)	21.4 (−5.9)	22.6 (−5.2)	24.6 (−4.1)	30.4 (−0.9)	33.8 (1.0)	38.5 (3.6)	36.1 (2.3)	31.1 (−0.5)	25.9 (−3.4)	21.9 (−5.6)	19.9 (−6.7)	27.2 (−2.6)
Source: PRISM Climate Group

== Demographics ==
Historical population
Census	Pop.	Note	%±
1980	3,542		—
1990	7,455		110.5%
2000	11,054		48.3%
2010	11,312		2.3%
2020	11,318		0.1%
U.S. Decennial Census

=== 2020 census ===
As of the 2020 census, Gardnerville Ranchos had a population of 11,318. The median age was 49.1 years. 20.0% of residents were under the age of 18 and 26.6% of residents were 65 years of age or older. For every 100 females there were 100.2 males, and for every 100 females age 18 and over there were 95.8 males age 18 and over.

95.6% of residents lived in urban areas, while 4.4% lived in rural areas.

There were 4,610 households in Gardnerville Ranchos, of which 27.2% had children under the age of 18 living in them. Of all households, 53.6% were married-couple households, 16.7% were households with a male householder and no spouse or partner present, and 22.4% were households with a female householder and no spouse or partner present. About 23.0% of all households were made up of individuals and 13.0% had someone living alone who was 65 years of age or older.

There were 4,785 housing units, of which 3.7% were vacant. The homeowner vacancy rate was 0.5% and the rental vacancy rate was 2.5%.

Racial composition as of the 2020 census
Race	Number	Percent
White	9,123	80.6%
Black or African American	60	0.5%
American Indian and Alaska Native	154	1.4%
Asian	153	1.4%
Native Hawaiian and Other Pacific Islander	36	0.3%
Some other race	542	4.8%
Two or more races	1,250	11.0%
Hispanic or Latino (of any race)	1,618	14.3%

=== 2000 census ===
As of the 2000 census, there were 11,054 people, 4,003 households, and 3,146 families living in the CDP. The population density was 750.0 inhabitants per square mile (289.6/km^{2}). There were 4,123 housing units at an average density of 279.7 units per square mile (108.0 units/km^{2}). The racial makeup of the CDP was 91.7% White, 0.3% African American, 2.2% Native American, 1.0% Asian, 0.1% Pacific Islander, 2.1% from other races, and 2.6% from two or more races. Hispanic or Latino of any race were 7.5% of the population.

There were 4,003 households, out of which 40.8% had children under the age of 18 living with them, 62.8% were married couples living together, 11.0% had a female householder with no husband present, and 21.4% were non-families. 15.9% of all households were made up of individuals, and 4.9% had someone living alone who was 65 years of age or older. The average household size was 2.75 and the average family size was 3.06.

In the CDP, the population was spread out, with 29.6% under the age of 18, 6.0% from 18 to 24, 29.0% from 25 to 44, 23.5% from 45 to 64, and 11.9% who were 65 years of age or older. The median age was 37 years. For every 100 females, there were 99.8 males. For every 100 females age 18 and over, there were 96.8 males.

The median income for a household in the CDP was $48,795, and the median income for a family was $51,546. Males had a median income of $37,292 versus $26,875 for females. The per capita income for the CDP was $20,856. About 6.4% of families and 7.2% of the population were below the poverty line, including 8.8% of those under age 18 and 3.0% of those age 65 or over.

== Transportation ==
Transportation in Gardnerville Ranchos is provided by Douglas Area Rural Transit
