= Spanish Springs, Nevada =

- Census-designated place
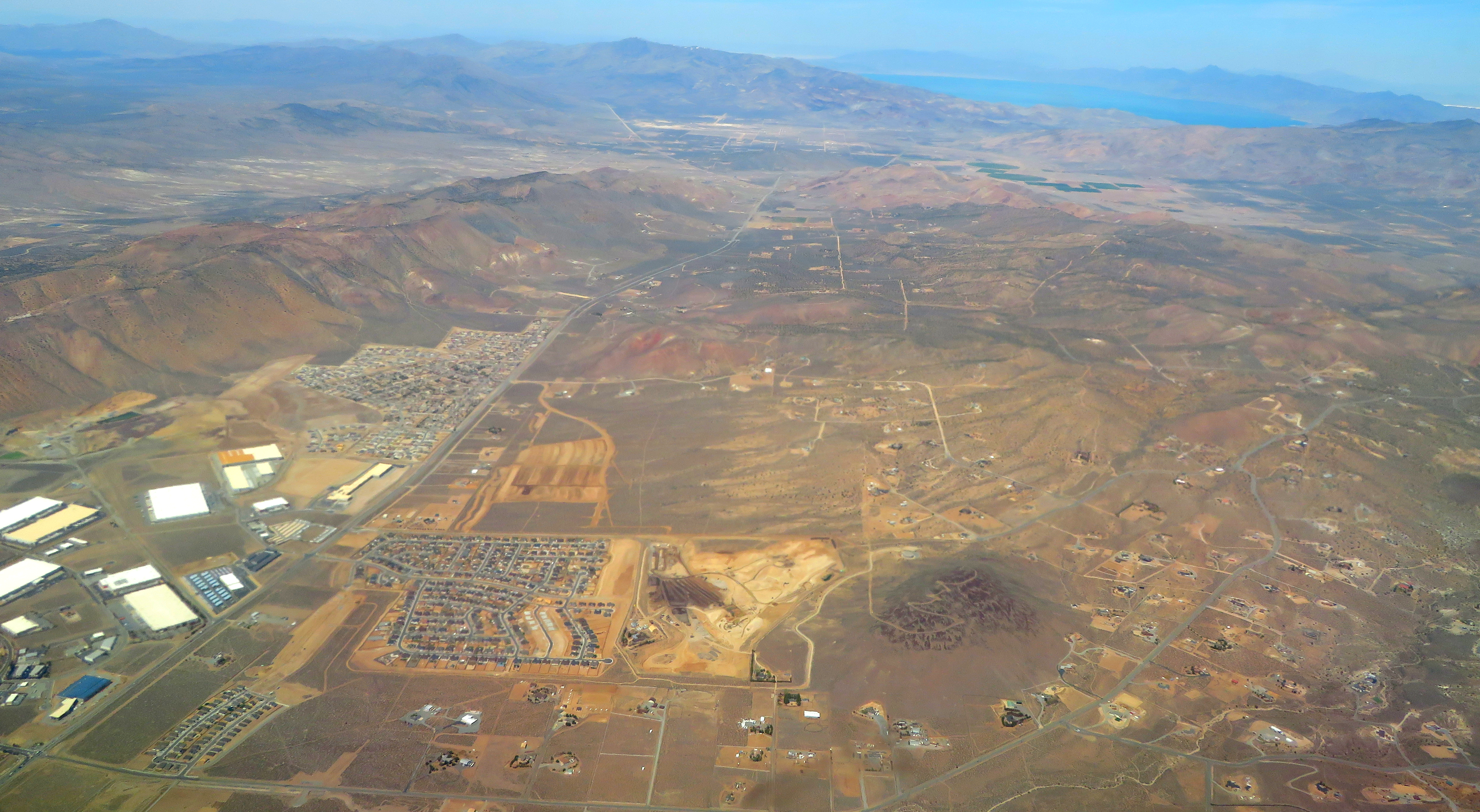
- Aerial view of Spanish Springs

- Location of Spanish Springs, Nevada
- Coordinates: 39°39′30″N 119°41′42″W
- Country: United States
- State: Nevada

Area
  - Total: 55.89 sq mi (144.76 km^{2})
  - Land: 55.56 sq mi (143.91 km^{2})
  - Water: 0.33 sq mi (0.86 km^{2})
- Elevation: 4,518 ft (1,377 m)

Population (2020)
  - Total: 17,314
  - Density: 311.6/sq mi (120.31/km^{2})
- Time zone: UTC−8 (Pacific (PST))
  - Summer (DST): UTC−7 (PDT)
- ZIP codes: 89436, 89441
- Area code: 775
- FIPS code: 32-68350
- GNIS feature ID: 1852658

Spanish Springs is a census-designated place (CDP) in Washoe County, Nevada, United States. It is located in the northeastern part of the Reno–Sparks Metropolitan Statistical Area. As of the 2020 census, Spanish Springs had a population of 17,314.

== Geography ==
Spanish Springs is located at 39°39′30″N 119°41′42″W (39.658301, -119.695130).

According to the United States Census Bureau, the CDP has a total area of 56.0 square miles (145.0 km^{2}), of which 55.7 square miles (144.2 km^{2}) is land and 0.35 square miles (0.9 km^{2}), or 0.59%, is water.

== History ==
Sky Ranch Airport, a 2,000-foot (610 m)-long dirt airstrip, was located northeast of the intersection of State Route 445 and Spanish Springs Road. This 1940s auxiliary field was the site of the first Reno Air Races, in 1964 and 1965, then was the location of the headquarters of the 126,000-acre (510 km^{2}) Rocketdyne Nevada Field Laboratory (NFL), which was used in the late 1960s and early 1970s for testing rocket engines used in the Space Program.

The Sky Ranch airfield site has been covered by housing developments, which are expanding in the area as the Reno-Sparks metropolitan area expands.

With the closure of Sky Ranch in 1970, another airfield was graded approximately 2 miles (3 km) west. Now known as Spanish Springs Airport (N86), it has been in continuous operation since 1971.

== Education ==
As of 2013, the Washoe County School District is offering an elective course in the Paiute language at Spanish Springs High School. Washoe County is the first school district in Nevada to offer Paiute classes.

Spanish Springs has a public library, a branch of the Washoe County Library.

== Demographics ==
Historical population
Census	Pop.	Note	%±
2000	9,018		—
2010	15,064		67.0%
2020	17,314		14.9%
U.S. Decennial Census

=== 2020 census ===
As of the 2020 census, Spanish Springs had a population of 17,314. The median age was 45.3 years. 21.8% of residents were under the age of 18 and 19.5% of residents were 65 years of age or older. For every 100 females there were 99.8 males, and for every 100 females age 18 and over there were 98.7 males age 18 and over.

83.9% of residents lived in urban areas, while 16.1% lived in rural areas.

There were 6,292 households in Spanish Springs, of which 32.6% had children under the age of 18 living in them. Of all households, 67.3% were married-couple households, 12.7% were households with a male householder and no spouse or partner present, and 13.9% were households with a female householder and no spouse or partner present. About 14.5% of all households were made up of individuals and 8.5% had someone living alone who was 65 years of age or older.

There were 6,481 housing units, of which 2.9% were vacant. The homeowner vacancy rate was 0.7% and the rental vacancy rate was 10.3%.

Racial composition as of the 2020 census
Race	Number	Percent
White	13,970	80.7%
Black or African American	161	0.9%
American Indian and Alaska Native	215	1.2%
Asian	346	2.0%
Native Hawaiian and Other Pacific Islander	45	0.3%
Some other race	677	3.9%
Two or more races	1,900	11.0%
Hispanic or Latino (of any race)	2,180	12.6%

=== 2010 census ===
As of the 2010 census, the population was 15,064.

=== 2000 census ===
As of the 2000 census, there were 9,018 people, 3,014 households, and 2,531 families residing in the CDP. The population density was 151.5 inhabitants per square mile (58.5/km^{2}). There were 3,078 housing units at an average density of 51.7 per square mile (20.0/km^{2}). The racial makeup of the CDP was 92.6% White, 0.7% African American, 1.2% Native American, 1.4% Asian, 0.1% Pacific Islander, 1.7% from other races, and 2.3% from two or more races. Hispanic or Latino of any race were 5.8% of the population.

There were 3,014 households, out of which 47.4% had children under the age of 18 living with them, 75.2% were married couples living together, 5.0% had a female householder with no husband present, and 16.0% were non-families. 9.6% of all households were made up of individuals, and 1.1% had someone living alone who was 65 years of age or older. The average household size was 2.99 and the average family size was 3.20.

In the CDP, the population was spread out, with 31.4% under the age of 18, 4.3% from 18 to 24, 36.9% from 25 to 44, 22.8% from 45 to 64, and 4.6% who were 65 years of age or older. The median age was 35 years. For every 100 females, there were 104.3 males. For every 100 females age 18 and over, there were 102.3 males.

The median income for a household in the CDP was $69,451, and the median income for a family was $72,026. Males had a median income of $46,711 versus $32,853 for females. The per capita income for the CDP was $26,908. About 2.2% of families and 3.5% of the population were below the poverty line, including 2.8% of those under age 18 and none of those age 65 or over.
