= Lakeridge, Nevada =

- Census-designated place
- Location of Lakeridge, Nevada
- Coordinates: 39°2′11″N 119°56′42″W
- Country: United States
- State: Nevada

Area
  - Total: 1.53 sq mi (3.97 km^{2})
  - Land: 1.46 sq mi (3.77 km^{2})
  - Water: 0.077 sq mi (0.20 km^{2})
- Elevation: 6,400 ft (2,000 m)

Population (2020)
  - Total: 409
  - Density: 281.0/sq mi (108.51/km^{2})
- Time zone: UTC-8 (Pacific (PST))
  - Summer (DST): UTC-7 (PDT)
- ZIP code: 89413
- Area code: 775
- FIPS code: 32-39100
- GNIS feature ID: 2583937

Lakeridge is a census-designated place (CDP) in Douglas County, Nevada, United States. As of the 2020 census, Lakeridge had a population of 409.

== Geography ==
Lakeridge is located on the east shore of Lake Tahoe in far western Nevada. U.S. Route 50 is the main road through the CDP, leading south 6 miles (10 km) to the California state line and northeast 19 miles (31 km) to Carson City. According to the United States Census Bureau, the CDP has a total area of 1.5 square miles (4.0 km^{2}), of which 1.5 square miles (3.8 km^{2}) is land and 0.077 square miles (0.2 km^{2}), or 5.0%, is water.

== Demographics ==
Historical population
Census	Pop.	Note	%±
2010	371		—
2020	409		10.2%
U.S. Decennial Census
