= Indian Hills, Nevada =

- Census-designated place
- Location of Indian Hills, Nevada
- Coordinates: 39°5′29″N 119°46′38″W
- Country: United States
- State: Nevada

Area
  - Total: 14.61 sq mi (37.83 km^{2})
  - Land: 14.61 sq mi (37.83 km^{2})
  - Water: 0 sq mi (0.00 km^{2})
- Elevation: 4,764 ft (1,452 m)

Population (2020)
  - Total: 5,962
  - Density: 408.2/sq mi (157.61/km^{2})
- Time zone: UTC-8 (Pacific (PST))
  - Summer (DST): UTC-7 (PDT)
- FIPS code: 32-35275
- GNIS feature ID: 1867347

Indian Hills is a census-designated place (CDP) in Douglas County, Nevada, United States. It lies on the south side of the Carson City metropolitan area. As of the 2020 census, Indian Hills had a population of 5,962.

== Geography ==
Indian Hills is located at 39°5′29″N 119°46′38″W (39.091288, -119.777265).

According to the United States Census Bureau, the CDP has a total area of 14.6 square miles (37.8 km^{2}), all of it land.

== Demographics ==
Historical population
Census	Pop.	Note	%±
1990	2,544		—
2000	4,407		73.2%
2010	5,627		27.7%
2020	5,962		6.0%
U.S. Decennial Census

=== 2020 census ===
As of the 2020 census, Indian Hills had a population of 5,962. The median age was 48.5 years. 19.7% of residents were under the age of 18 and 25.3% of residents were 65 years of age or older. For every 100 females there were 100.3 males, and for every 100 females age 18 and over there were 96.3 males age 18 and over.

91.6% of residents lived in urban areas, while 8.4% lived in rural areas.

There were 2,395 households in Indian Hills, of which 26.2% had children under the age of 18 living in them. Of all households, 53.1% were married-couple households, 17.1% were households with a male householder and no spouse or partner present, and 23.6% were households with a female householder and no spouse or partner present. About 23.7% of all households were made up of individuals and 13.9% had someone living alone who was 65 years of age or older.

There were 2,487 housing units, of which 3.7% were vacant. The homeowner vacancy rate was 1.3% and the rental vacancy rate was 3.8%.

Racial composition as of the 2020 census
Race	Number	Percent
White	4,419	74.1%
Black or African American	72	1.2%
American Indian and Alaska Native	109	1.8%
Asian	181	3.0%
Native Hawaiian and Other Pacific Islander	21	0.4%
Some other race	517	8.7%
Two or more races	643	10.8%
Hispanic or Latino (of any race)	1,225	20.5%

=== 2000 census ===
As of the census of 2000, there were 4,407 people, 1,661 households, and 1,297 families residing in the CDP. The population density was 449.5 inhabitants per square mile (173.6/km^{2}). There were 1,737 housing units at an average density of 177.2 per square mile (68.4/km^{2}). The racial makeup of the CDP was 91.31% White, 0.23% African American, 1.23% Native American, 0.86% Asian, 4.22% from other races, and 2.16% from two or more races. Hispanic or Latino of any race were 9.48% of the population.

There were 1,661 households, out of which 36.7% had children under the age of 18 living with them, 62.6% were married couples living together, 11.2% had a female householder with no husband present, and 21.9% were non-families. 15.9% of all households were made up of individuals, and 5.1% had someone living alone who was 65 years of age or older. The average household size was 2.65 and the average family size was 2.96.

In the CDP, the population was spread out, with 26.8% under the age of 18, 6.1% from 18 to 24, 28.6% from 25 to 44, 25.7% from 45 to 64, and 12.8% who were 65 years of age or older. The median age was 38 years. For every 100 females, there were 97.3 males. For every 100 females age 18 and over, there were 95.9 males.

The median income for a household in the CDP was $56,109, and the median income for a family was $58,162. Males had a median income of $42,159 versus $28,885 for females. The per capita income for the CDP was $23,027. About 5.9% of families and 5.1% of the population were below the poverty line, including 5.4% of those under age 18 and 10.7% of those age 65 or over.

== In popular culture ==
In the television series Sons of Anarchy, the titular fictional outlaw motorcycle club is depicted as having a charter in Indian Hills.
