= Douglas County, Nevada =

County in Nevada, United States

- County
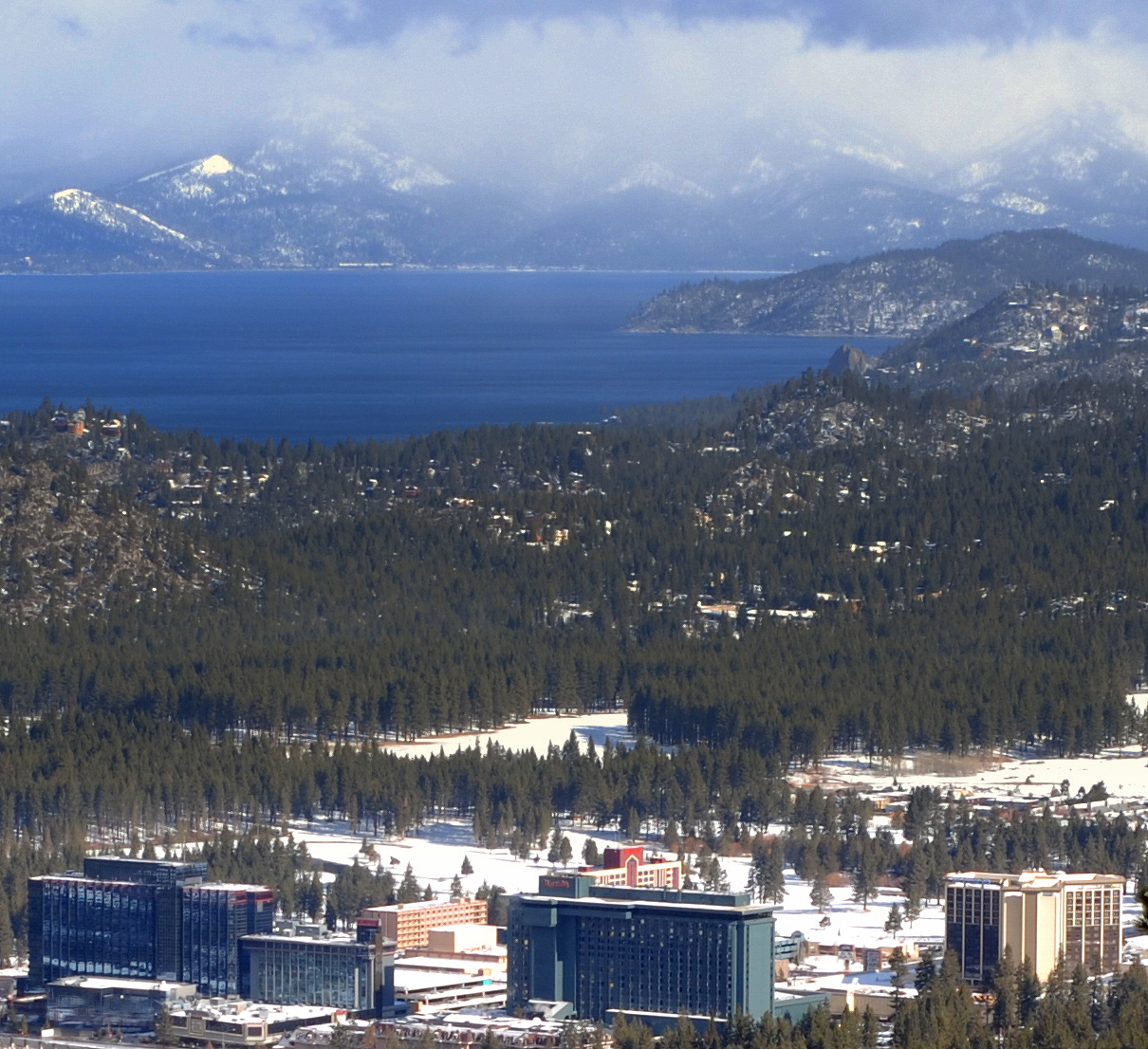
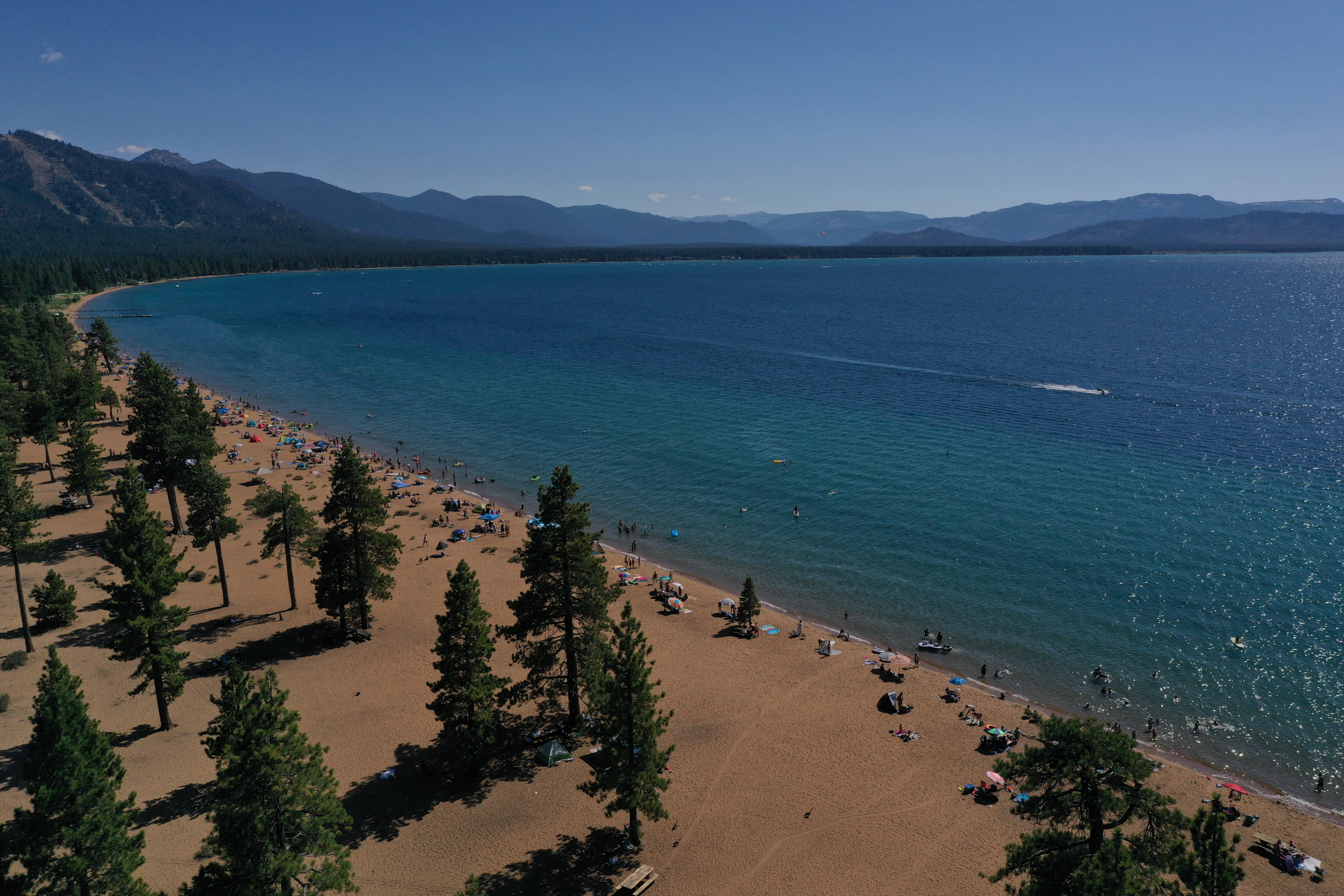
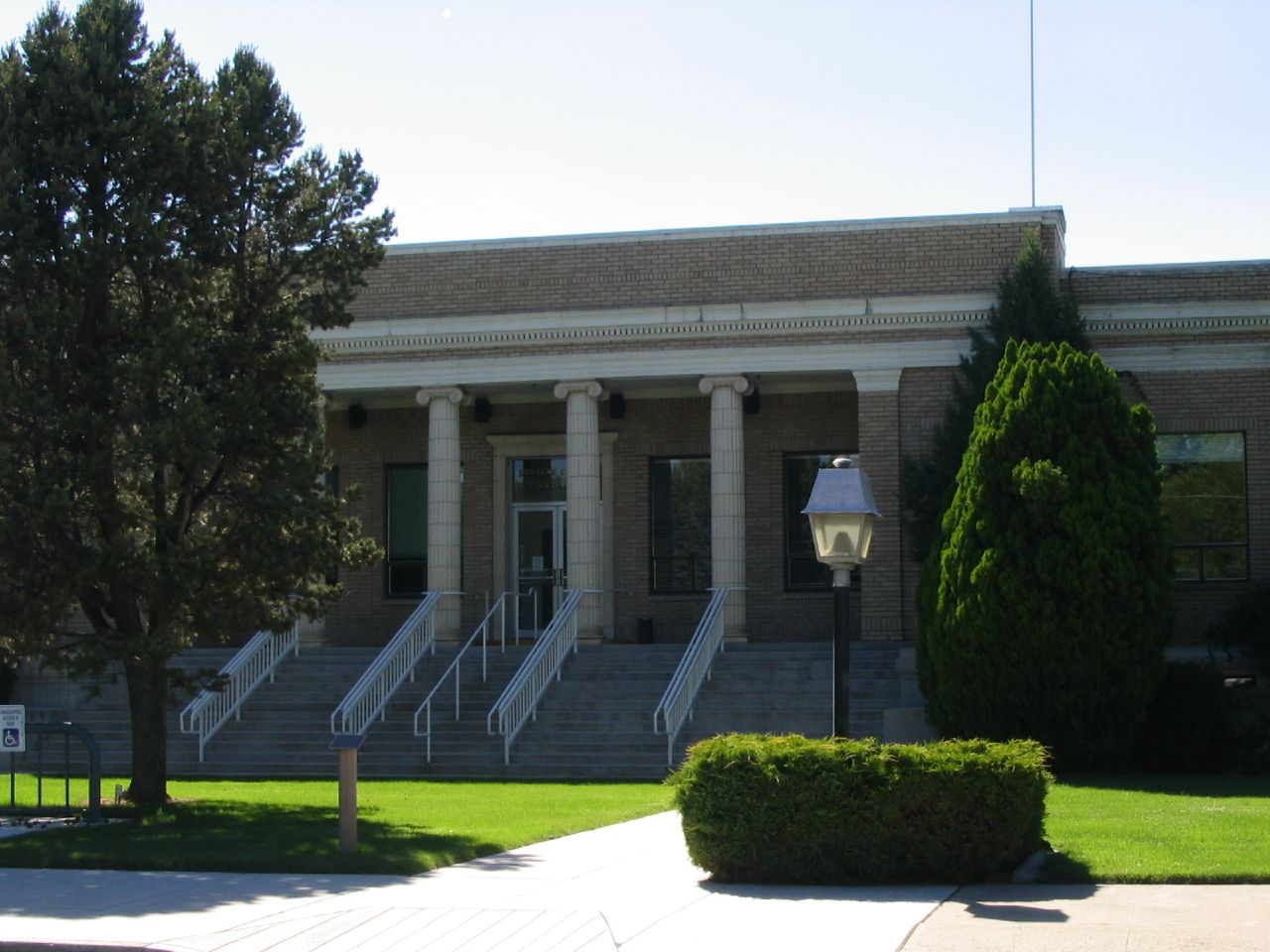
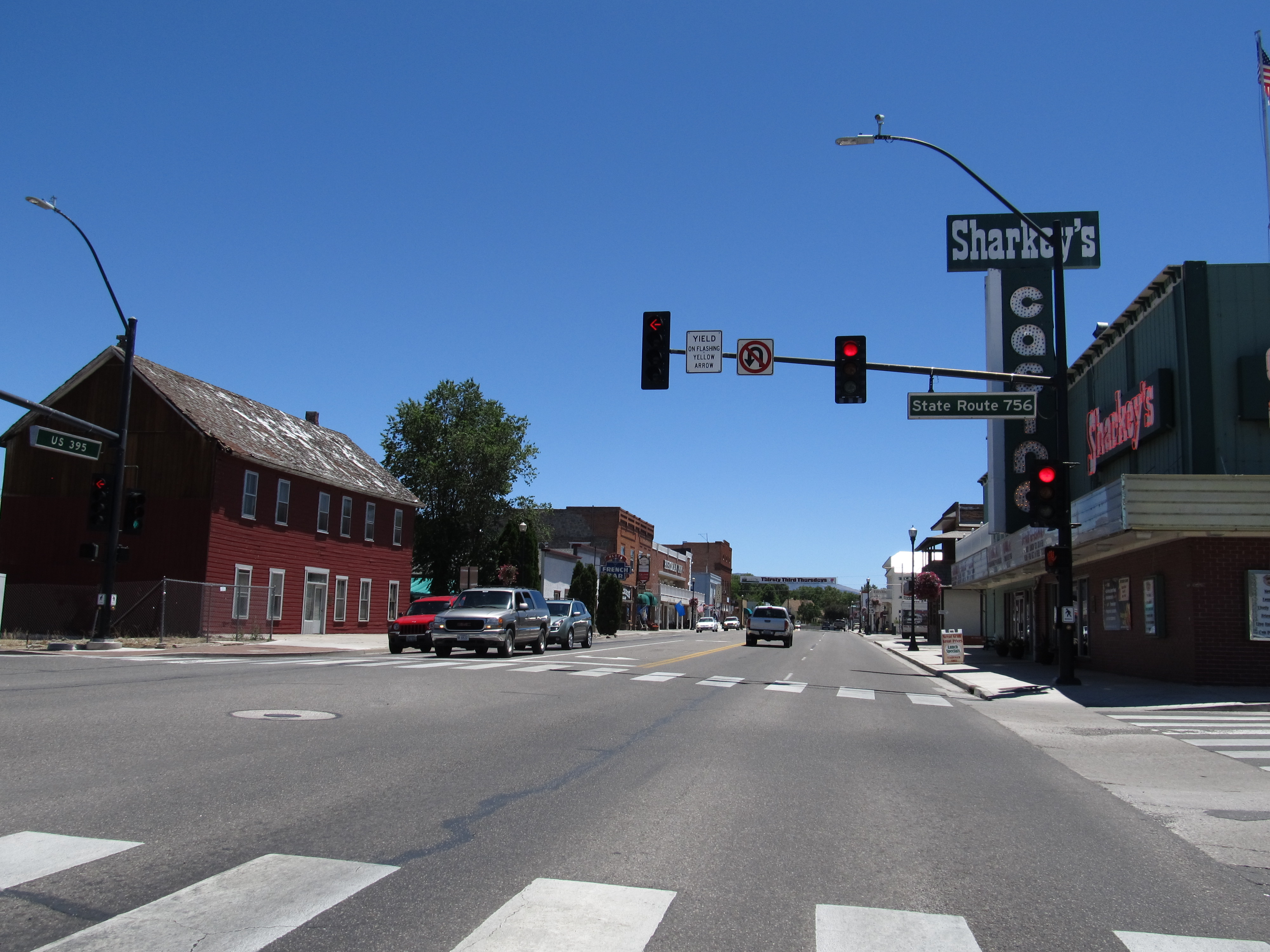
- From top, left to right: View of Stateline from near Heavenly Mountain Resort. Nevada Beach Campground in Zephyr Cove. Douglas County Courthouse in Minden. Downtown Gardnerville.

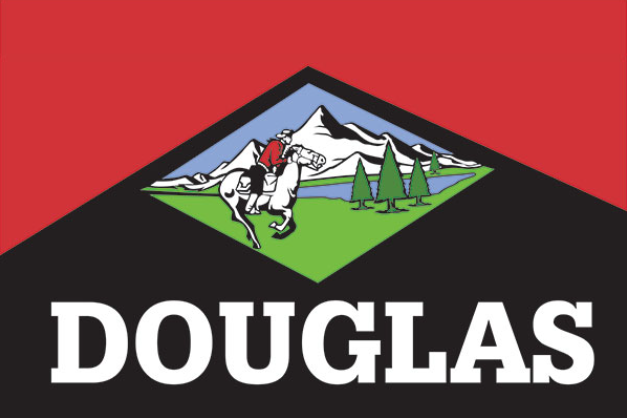
- Flag Logo

- Location within the U.S. state of Nevada
- Coordinates: 38°55′N 119°37′W
- Country: United States
- State: Nevada
- Founded: 1861; 165 years ago
- Named for: Stephen A. Douglas
- Seat: Minden
- Largest community: Gardnerville Ranchos

Area
  - Total: 738 sq mi (1,910 km^{2})
  - Land: 710 sq mi (1,800 km^{2})
  - Water: 28 sq mi (73 km^{2}) 3.8%

Population (2020)
  - Total: 49,488
  - Estimate (2025): 50,111 ▲
  - Density: 70/sq mi (27/km^{2})
- Time zone: UTC−8 (Pacific)
  - Summer (DST): UTC−7 (PDT)
- Congressional district: 2nd
- Website: www.douglascountynv.gov

Douglas County is a county in the northwestern part of the U.S. state of Nevada. As of the 2020 census, the population was 49,488. Its county seat is Minden. Douglas County comprises the Gardnerville Ranchos, NV Micropolitan Statistical Area, which is also included in the Reno–Carson City–Fernley, NV Combined Statistical Area.

== History ==
The town of Genoa in Douglas County was the first permanent settlement in Nevada. Genoa was settled in 1851 by Mormon traders selling goods to settlers on their way to California. Named for Stephen A. Douglas, famous for his 1860 Presidential campaign and debates with Abraham Lincoln, Douglas County was one of the first nine counties formed in 1861 by the Nevada territorial legislature.

The county seat is Minden, after having been moved from Genoa in 1915.

Various services run by the county include parks, law enforcement, road maintenance, building inspection, and the Minden–Tahoe Airport.

Fire protection and emergency medical services are provided by the Tahoe-Douglas Fire Protection District at the lake and the East Fork Fire Protection District for the rest of the county.

== Geography ==
According to the U.S. Census Bureau, the county has an area of 738 square miles (1,910 km^{2}), of which 710 square miles (1,800 km^{2}) is land and 28 square miles (73 km^{2}) (3.8%) is water. It is the second-smallest county in Nevada by area. The highest point is East Peak at 9,593 ft (2,924 m), while the most topographically prominent mountain is Mount Siegel.

Douglas County is in western Nevada in the western United States. Stretching from Carson Valley and running up into the Sierra Nevada, the county is bordered on the west by California, and contains about 13.2% of Lake Tahoe, which is split across the two states. Carson City, the state capital, lies to the north, and Lyon County to the east.

=== Adjacent counties and city ===
- Carson City – north
- Lyon County – east
- Mono County, California – southeast
- Alpine County, California – south
- El Dorado County, California – west
- Placer County, California – northwest

=== National protected area ===
- Toiyabe National Forest

== Transportation ==
Public Transportation With Douglas County is offered by Douglas Area Rural Transit, Tahoe Transportation District and Eastern Sierra Transit

=== Major highways ===
- U.S. Route 50
- U.S. Route 395
- State Route 28
- State Route 88
- State Route 206
- State Route 207
- State Route 208
- State Route 756
- State Route 757
- State Route 759
- State Route 760

== Demographics ==
Historical population
Census	Pop.	Note	%±
1870	1,215		—
1880	1,581		30.1%
1890	1,551		−1.9%
1900	1,534		−1.1%
1910	1,895		23.5%
1920	1,825		−3.7%
1930	1,840		0.8%
1940	2,056		11.7%
1950	2,029		−1.3%
1960	3,481		71.6%
1970	6,882		97.7%
1980	19,421		182.2%
1990	27,637		42.3%
2000	41,259		49.3%
2010	46,997		13.9%
2020	49,488		5.3%
2025 (est.)	50,111	▲	1.3%
U.S. Decennial Census; 1790–1960 1900–1990; 1990–2000 2010–2020

=== Racial and ethnic composition ===
Douglas County, Nevada – Racial and ethnic composition Note: the US Census treats Hispanic/Latino as an ethnic category. This table excludes Latinos from the racial categories and assigns them to a separate category. Hispanics/Latinos may be of any race.
Race / Ethnicity (NH = Non-Hispanic)	Pop 1980	Pop 1990	Pop 2000	Pop 2010	Pop 2020	% 1980	% 1990	% 2000	% 2010	% 2020
White alone (NH)	18,215	25,019	36,231	39,094	38,856	93.79%	90.53%	87.81%	83.18%	78.52%
Black or African American alone (NH)	34	81	122	174	183	0.18%	0.29%	0.30%	0.37%	0.37%
Native American or Alaska Native alone (NH)	349	538	613	759	807	1.80%	1.95%	1.49%	1.61%	1.63%
Asian alone (NH)	121	340	496	699	898	0.62%	1.23%	1.20%	1.49%	1.81%
Native Hawaiian or Pacific Islander alone (NH)	x	x	48	60	81	x	x	0.12%	0.13%	0.16%
Other race alone (NH)	8	7	23	64	240	0.04%	0.03%	0.06%	0.14%	0.48%
Mixed race or Multiracial (NH)	x	x	669	1,044	2,282	x	x	1.62%	2.22%	4.61%
Hispanic or Latino (any race)	694	1,652	3,057	5,103	6,141	3.57%	5.98%	7.41%	10.86%	12.41%
Total	19,421	27,637	41,259	46,997	49,488	100.00%	100.00%	100.00%	100.00%	100.00%

=== 2020 census ===
As of the 2020 census, the county had a population of 49,488. The median age was 54.1 years. 16.7% of residents were under the age of 18 and 30.7% of residents were 65 years of age or older. For every 100 females there were 100.3 males, and for every 100 females age 18 and over there were 98.0 males age 18 and over. 70.3% of residents lived in urban areas, while 29.7% lived in rural areas.

The racial makeup of the county was 81.4% White, 0.5% Black or African American, 2.0% American Indian and Alaska Native, 1.9% Asian, 0.2% Native Hawaiian and Pacific Islander, 4.5% from some other race, and 9.4% from two or more races. Hispanic or Latino residents of any race comprised 12.4% of the population.

There were 21,400 households in the county, of which 22.1% had children under the age of 18 living with them and 21.8% had a female householder with no spouse or partner present. About 25.7% of all households were made up of individuals and 14.6% had someone living alone who was 65 years of age or older.

There were 24,309 housing units, of which 12.0% were vacant. Among occupied housing units, 75.4% were owner-occupied and 24.6% were renter-occupied. The homeowner vacancy rate was 1.3% and the rental vacancy rate was 5.3%.

=== 2010 census ===
As of the 2010 United States census, there were 46,997 people, 19,638 households, and 13,519 families living in the county. The population density was 66.2 inhabitants per square mile (25.6/km^{2}). There were 23,671 housing units at an average density of 33.4 per square mile (12.9/km^{2}). The racial makeup of the county was 89.6% white, 1.9% Native American, 1.5% Asian, 0.4% black or African American, 0.1% Pacific islander, 3.2% from other races, and 3.1% from two or more races. Those of Hispanic or Latino origin made up 10.9% of the population. In terms of ancestry, 25.7% were German, 17.5% were English, 14.9% were Irish, 8.0% were Italian, and 4.1% were American.

Of the 19,638 households, 26.7% had children under the age of 18 living with them, 55.5% were married couples living together, 8.9% had a female householder with no husband present, 31.2% were non-families, and 24.0% of all households were made up of individuals. The average household size was 2.38 and the average family size was 2.80. The median age was 47.4 years.

The median income for a household in the county was $60,721 and the median income for a family was $73,543. Males had a median income of $52,001 versus $39,825 for females. The per capita income for the county was $35,239. About 5.4% of families and 7.9% of the population were below the poverty line, including 10.8% of those under age 18 and 6.1% of those age 65 or over.

=== 2000 census ===
As of the census of 2000, there were 41,259 people, 16,401 households, and 11,890 families living in the county. The population density was 58 people per square mile (22 people/km^{2}). There were 19,006 housing units at an average density of 27 per square mile (10/km^{2}). The racial makeup of the county was 91.9% White, 0.3% Black or African American, 1.7% Native American, 1.3% Asian, 0.2% Pacific Islander, 2.5% from other races, and 2.2% from two or more races. 7.4% of the population were Hispanic or Latino of any race.

There were 16,401 households, out of which 30.7% had children under the age of 18 living with them, 60.5% were married couples living together, 8.0% had a female householder with no husband present, and 27.5% were non-families. 20.7% of all households were made up of individuals, and 6.6% had someone living alone who was 65 years of age or older. The average household size was 2.50 and the average family size was 2.88.

In the county, the population was spread out, with 24.0% under the age of 18, 5.5% from 18 to 24, 26.4% from 25 to 44, 28.9% from 45 to 64, and 15.2% who were 65 years of age or older. The median age was 42 years. For every 100 females there were 102.1 males. For every 100 females age 18 and over, there were 100.7 males.

The median income for a household in the county was $51,849, and the median income for a family was $57,092. Males had a median income of $40,436 versus $28,762 for females. The per capita income for the county was $27,288. About 5.8% of families and 7.3% of the population were below the poverty line, including 9.7% of those under age 18 and 5.3% of those age 65 or over.

== Communities ==
=== Census-designated places ===
There are no incorporated towns or cities in Douglas County. The following communities are census-designated places, meaning population and demographic data is available from the U.S. Census Bureau for each one:

- Carter Springs
- Double Spring
- East Valley
- Fish Springs
- Gardnerville
- Gardnerville Ranchos
- Genoa
- Glenbrook
- Indian Hills
- Johnson Lane
- Kingsbury
- Lakeridge
- Logan Creek
- Minden (county seat)
- Round Hill Village
- Ruhenstroth
- Skyland
- Stateline
- Topaz Lake
- Topaz Ranch Estates
- Zephyr Cove

=== Unincorporated communities ===
- Centerville
- Dresslerville
- Holbrook Junction
- Mottsville
- Sheridan

== Politics ==
Historically Douglas was the most Republican county in Nevada, a state that tended to lean Democratic between the 1890s and 1950s. The last Democrat to carry the county was Franklin D. Roosevelt in 1936 during his 48-state landslide over Alf Landon, and even then, he carried Douglas by 15 percent less than his statewide margin. It was the only Nevada county won by Charles Evans Hughes in 1916, and one of only two to vote for Progressive “Bull Moose” ex-President Theodore Roosevelt in 1912. It was also one of only two Nevada counties that voted for incumbent President Benjamin Harrison over insurgent Populist James B. Weaver in 1892 when the latter carried the state by over 40 percentage points. Even when the county did vote Democratic in 1896 and 1900, it was by much smaller margins than the rest of silver-mining Nevada.

The county remains a Republican stronghold, although it now is not quite as heavily Republican as some other rural counties in the state. Apart from FDR's two victories, only two Democrats since 1920 — Lyndon Johnson in 1964 and Barack Obama in 2008 — have won even 40 percent of the county's vote. Despite the county's strong Republican bent, residents tend to be somewhat moderate on social issues, with a small majority of county residents voting to legalize gay marriage in 2020.

United States presidential election results for Douglas County, Nevada
Year	Republican		Democratic		Third party(ies)	
Year	No.	%	No.	%	No.	%
1868	256	61.84%	158	38.16%	0	0.00%
1872	231	68.75%	105	31.25%	0	0.00%
1876	332	64.97%	179	35.03%	0	0.00%
1880	247	47.32%	275	52.68%	0	0.00%
1884	215	56.28%	167	43.72%	0	0.00%
1888	269	64.20%	144	34.37%	6	1.43%
1892	196	49.62%	36	9.11%	163	41.27%
1896	175	39.77%	265	60.23%	0	0.00%
1900	212	49.19%	219	50.81%	0	0.00%
1904	262	68.59%	112	29.32%	8	2.09%
1908	229	54.65%	173	41.29%	17	4.06%
1912	80	19.18%	143	34.29%	194	46.52%
1916	337	48.70%	301	43.50%	54	7.80%
1920	503	76.68%	147	22.41%	6	0.91%
1924	343	59.04%	95	16.35%	143	24.61%
1928	456	71.03%	186	28.97%	0	0.00%
1932	331	45.40%	398	54.60%	0	0.00%
1936	346	42.61%	466	57.39%	0	0.00%
1940	592	64.21%	330	35.79%	0	0.00%
1944	556	66.35%	282	33.65%	0	0.00%
1948	719	69.67%	298	28.88%	15	1.45%
1952	948	84.27%	177	15.73%	0	0.00%
1956	1,063	80.59%	256	19.41%	0	0.00%
1960	1,164	66.48%	587	33.52%	0	0.00%
1964	1,127	52.74%	1,010	47.26%	0	0.00%
1968	1,801	64.37%	670	23.95%	327	11.69%
1972	2,898	74.67%	983	25.33%	0	0.00%
1976	3,095	58.60%	1,934	36.61%	253	4.79%
1980	5,254	71.55%	1,352	18.41%	737	10.04%
1984	6,385	75.57%	1,877	22.22%	187	2.21%
1988	7,074	67.02%	3,107	29.44%	374	3.54%
1992	6,182	40.82%	3,928	25.94%	5,035	33.25%
1996	8,828	54.83%	5,109	31.73%	2,163	13.43%
2000	11,193	62.27%	5,837	32.47%	944	5.25%
2004	15,192	63.57%	8,275	34.63%	431	1.80%
2008	14,648	56.55%	10,672	41.20%	584	2.25%
2012	16,276	62.42%	9,297	35.65%	502	1.93%
2016	17,415	62.45%	8,454	30.32%	2,016	7.23%
2020	21,630	63.38%	11,571	33.91%	924	2.71%
2024	23,237	65.35%	11,553	32.49%	766	2.15%

United States Senate election results for Douglas County, Nevada1
Year	Republican		Democratic		Third party(ies)	
Year	No.	%	No.	%	No.	%
2024	22,125	62.76%	11,675	33.12%	1,455	4.13%

The county is governed by five elected officers, an elected five-member Board of County Commissioners, an appointed county manager and various other elected or appointed positions. The commissioners serve four-year, overlapping terms.

Douglas County Board of County Commissioners
District	Commissioner	Party	First elected	Last elected	Notes
1	Danny Tarkanian	Republican	2020	2024	
2	Sharla Hales	Republican	2022	2022	
3	Mark Gardner	Republican	2020	2024	Chairman
4	Wesley Rice	Republican	2018	2022	
5	Nathan Tolbert	Republican	2024	2024	Vice-chair

== Economy ==
=== Major employers ===
- Starbucks roasting plant
- Patmont Motor Werks
- Bently Nevada, part of Baker Hughes
- North Sails
- TeslaWatt

== Education ==
Douglas County's public K-12 education is managed by the Douglas County School District. It serves all of Douglas County, having two main areas: Lake Tahoe & the Carson Valley. Douglas High School also serves most of the high school age students from Alpine County, California

=== Lake Tahoe ===
- George Whittell High School
- Zephyr Cove Elementary School

=== Carson Valley ===
- Douglas High School
- Aspire Academy High School
- Carson Valley Middle School
- Pau-Wa-Lu Middle School
- Gardnerville Elementary School
- Minden Elementary School
- Jacks Valley Elementary School
- Piñion Hills Elementary School
- Gene L. Scarselli Elementary School

=== Private schools ===
- Sierra Lutheran High School
- Faith Christian Academy
- Grace Christian Academy

== Media ==
- Carson Valley Times
- The Record-Courier

== In popular culture ==
- Smokin Aces
- Charley Varrick
- The Shootist
- Misery
- The Motel Life
- The Wizard (1989 film)

== See also ==
- National Register of Historic Places listings in Douglas County, Nevada
