= Johnson Lane, Nevada =

- Census-designated place
- Location of Johnson Lane, Nevada
- Coordinates: 39°2′15″N 119°43′48″W
- Country: United States
- State: Nevada
- County: Douglas

Area
  - Total: 21.88 sq mi (56.67 km^{2})
  - Land: 21.87 sq mi (56.65 km^{2})
  - Water: 0.0077 sq mi (0.02 km^{2})
- Elevation: 4,820 ft (1,470 m)

Population (2020)
  - Total: 6,409
  - Density: 293.0/sq mi (113.14/km^{2})
- Time zone: UTC-8 (Pacific (PST))
  - Summer (DST): UTC-7 (PDT)
- ZIP code: 89423
- Area code: 775
- FIPS code: 32-37190
- GNIS feature ID: 1867348

Johnson Lane is a census-designated place (CDP) in Douglas County, Nevada, United States. It lies on the south side of the Carson City metropolitan area. As of the 2020 census, Johnson Lane had a population of 6,409.

== Geography ==
Johnson Lane is located at 39°2′15″N 119°43′48″W (39.037535, -119.729971).

According to the United States Census Bureau, it has a total area of 21.88 square miles (56.67 km^{2}), of which 21.87 square miles (56.65 km^{2}) is land and 0.008 square miles (0.02 km^{2}), or 0.03%, is water.

== Demographics ==
Historical population
| Census | Pop. | Note | %± |
|---|---|---|---|
| 1990 | 2,551 | | — |
| 2000 | 4,857 | | 90.4% |
| 2010 | 6,490 | | 33.6% |
| 2020 | 6,409 | | −1.2% |

=== 2020 census ===
As of the 2020 census, Johnson Lane had a population of 6,409. The median age was 58.6 years. 14.7% of residents were under the age of 18 and 36.3% of residents were 65 years of age or older. For every 100 females there were 98.3 males, and for every 100 females age 18 and over there were 98.5 males age 18 and over.

82.2% of residents lived in urban areas, while 17.8% lived in rural areas.

There were 2,648 households in Johnson Lane, of which 20.7% had children under the age of 18 living in them. Of all households, 68.2% were married-couple households, 12.6% were households with a male householder and no spouse or partner present, and 14.7% were households with a female householder and no spouse or partner present. About 17.5% of all households were made up of individuals and 11.7% had someone living alone who was 65 years of age or older.

There were 2,737 housing units, of which 3.3% were vacant. The homeowner vacancy rate was 0.7% and the rental vacancy rate was 3.2%.

Racial composition as of the 2020 census
| Race | Number | Percent |
|---|---|---|
| White | 5,557 | 86.7% |
| Black or African American | 15 | 0.2% |
| American Indian and Alaska Native | 64 | 1.0% |
| Asian | 91 | 1.4% |
| Native Hawaiian and Other Pacific Islander | 6 | 0.1% |
| Some other race | 115 | 1.8% |
| Two or more races | 561 | 8.8% |
| Hispanic or Latino (of any race) | 515 | 8.0% |

=== 2000 census ===
As of the census of 2000, there were 4,837 people, 1,786 households, and 1,496 families residing in the CDP. The population density was 226.2 inhabitants per square mile (87.3/km^{2}). There were 1,829 housing units at an average density of 85.5 units per square mile (33.0 units/km^{2}). The racial makeup of the CDP was 95.29% White, 0.12% African American, 0.76% Native American, 0.91% Asian, 0.08% Pacific Islander, 0.64% from other races, and 2.19% from two or more races. Hispanic or Latino of any race were 4.38% of the population.

There were 1,786 households, out of which 33.5% had children under the age of 18 living with them, 75.1% were married couples living together, 5.3% had a female householder with no husband present, and 16.2% were non-families. 11.5% of all households were made up of individuals, and 3.1% had someone living alone who was 65 years of age or older. The average household size was 2.71 and the average family size was 2.91.

In the CDP, the population was spread out, with 24.5% under the age of 18, 4.7% from 18 to 24, 25.6% from 25 to 44, 32.1% from 45 to 64, and 13.0% who were 65 years of age or older. The median age was 43 years. For every 100 females, there were 99.7 males. For every 100 females age 18 and over, there were 99.6 males.

The median income for a household in the CDP was $59,130, and the median income for a family was $60,918. Males had a median income of $46,329 versus $29,907 for females. The per capita income for the CDP was $24,247. About 4.3% of families and 6.1% of the population were below the poverty line, including 6.9% of those under age 18 and 5.1% of those age 65 or over.
