= Gardnerville, Nevada =

Unincorporated town in the State of Nevada, United States

Gardnerville
- Unincorporated town
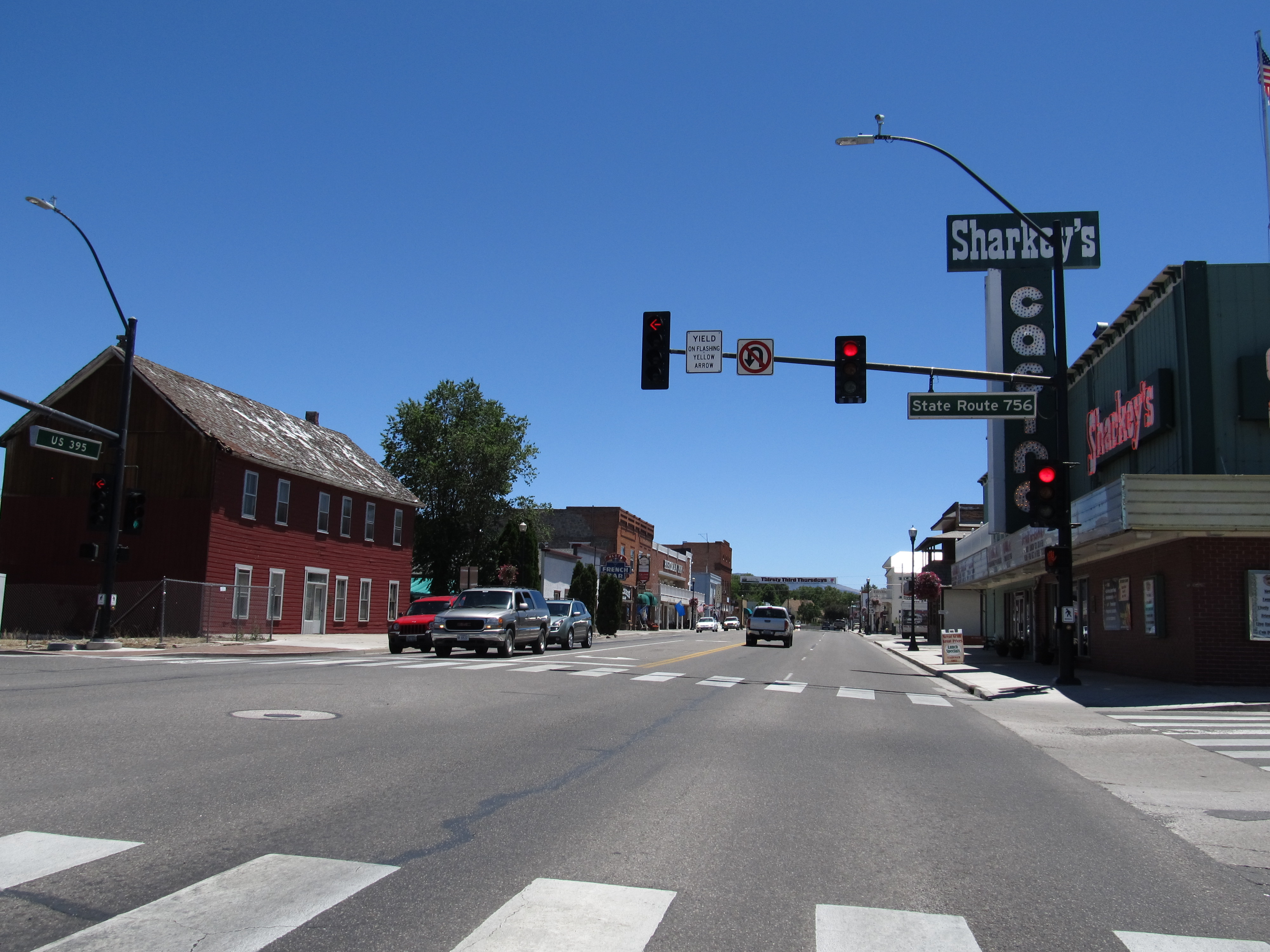
- Downtown Gardnerville (2012)

- Location within Douglas County and Nevada
- Coordinates: 38°56′27″N 119°44′37″W
- Country: United States
- State: Nevada
- County: Douglas

Area
  - Total: 4.80 sq mi (12.43 km^{2})
  - Land: 4.80 sq mi (12.43 km^{2})
  - Water: 0 sq mi (0.00 km^{2})
- Elevation: 4,751 ft (1,448 m)

Population (2020)
  - Total: 6,211
  - Density: 1,293.9/sq mi (499.57/km^{2})
- Time zone: UTC-8 (Pacific (PST))
  - Summer (DST): UTC-7 (PDT)
- ZIP codes: 89410, 89460
- Area code: 775
- FIPS code: 32-26300
- GNIS feature ID: 0859798

Nevada Historical Marker
- Reference no.: 129

Gardnerville is an unincorporated town in Douglas County, Nevada, United States, adjacent to the county seat of Minden. The population was 6,211 at the 2020 census.

U.S. Route 395 runs through the center of Gardnerville. State Route 207, known as Kingsbury Grade, connects Gardnerville to Stateline and U.S. Route 50.

== History ==
The community was named after John Gardner, a local cattleman.

It was a sundown town; a siren would be blown at 6 p.m. daily alerting Native Americans to leave town by sundown. The practice was ended in 2023 by SB 391 passed before the Nevada Legislature and signed into law by the governor. The area claimed that the nightly siren was a tribute to first responders.

== Geography ==
According to the United States Census Bureau, the census-designated place (CDP) of Gardnerville has a total area of 4.8 square miles (12 km^{2}), all of it land.

=== Climate ===
The area has a Köppen climate classification of Csb, which is a dry-summer subtropical climate often referred to as "Mediterranean".

Climate data for Gardnerville, Nevada
Month	Jan	Feb	Mar	Apr	May	Jun	Jul	Aug	Sep	Oct	Nov	Dec	Year
Mean daily maximum °F (°C)	45 (7)	51 (11)	57 (14)	64 (18)	73 (23)	82 (28)	91 (33)	89 (32)	82 (28)	70 (21)	56 (13)	47 (8)	67 (19)
Mean daily minimum °F (°C)	17 (−8)	22 (−6)	25 (−4)	30 (−1)	37 (3)	43 (6)	48 (9)	46 (8)	39 (4)	30 (−1)	23 (−5)	18 (−8)	32 (0)
Average precipitation inches (mm)	1.6 (41)	1.2 (30)	0.8 (20)	0.5 (13)	0.5 (13)	0.4 (10)	0.3 (7.6)	0.3 (7.6)	0.3 (7.6)	0.5 (13)	0.9 (23)	1.4 (36)	8.6 (220)
Source: Weatherbase

== Demographics ==
Historical population
Census	Pop.	Note	%±
1990	2,177		—
2000	3,357		54.2%
2010	5,656		68.5%
2020	6,211		9.8%
U.S. Decennial Census; 2020 Census

=== 2000 census ===
As of the census of 2000, there were 3,357 people, 1,473 households, and 870 families residing in the CDP. The population density was 699.9 inhabitants per square mile (270.2/km^{2}). There were 1,556 housing units at an average density of 324.4 per square mile (125.3/km^{2}). The racial makeup of the CDP was 89.93% White, 0.45% African American, 1.07% Native American, 1.28% Asian, 0.09% Pacific Islander, 5.30% from other races, and 1.88% from two or more races. Hispanic or Latino of any race were 11.83% of the population.

There were 1,473 households, out of which 28.6% had children under the age of 18 living with them, 43.2% were married couples living together, 11.5% had a female householder with no husband present, and 40.9% were non-families. 33.1% of all households were made up of individuals, and 13.5% had someone living alone who was 65 years of age or older. The average household size was 2.21 and the average family size was 2.82.

The population is relatively evenly distributed by age, with 22.6% under the age of 18, 7.5% from 18 to 24, 28.3% from 25 to 44, 21.1% from 45 to 64, and 20.4% who were 65 years of age or older. The median age was 39 years. For every 100 females, there were 93.0 males. For every 100 females age 18 and over, there were 87.6 males.

The median income for a household in the CDP was $41,204, and the median income for a family was $46,154. Males had a median income of $34,769 versus $29,550 for females. The per capita income for the CDP was $20,670. About 12.1% of families and 15.1% of the population were below the poverty line, including 23.1% of those under age 18 and 13.6% of those age 65 or over.

== Media ==
- Carson Valley Times
- The Record-Courier

== Transportation ==
The primary transportation provider in Gardnerville is Douglas Area Rural Transit. Gardnerville is also serviced by Eastern Sierra Transit. Tahoe Transportation District operates an express bus from Gardnerville to Carson City.

== Education ==
All areas of Douglas County are in the Douglas County School District.

== Notable people ==
- Mary McGee, American motorcycle racer
- Dave Mason, musician and songwriter
- Jill Derby, Nevada System of Higher Education regent
- Shawn Estes, Major League Baseball pitcher
- Sable Starr, groupie
- Stone Cold Steve Austin, retired professional wrestler and actor.

== In popular culture ==
- 1948: Chicken Every Sunday, directed by George Seaton
- 1957: Wild is the Wind, directed by George Cukor
- 1973: Charley Varrick, directed by Don Siegel, starring Walter Matthau, Joe Don Baker, Sheree North, and Andrew Robinson
- 1989: The Wizard, directed by Todd Holland, starring Fred Savage
- 2012: The Motel Life, directed by Alan and Gabriel Polsky, starring Emile Hirsch, Stephen Dorff, and Dakota Fanning

== See also ==
- List of sundown towns in the United States
