= Lake Tahoe =

Lake in California and Nevada, US

- Dáʔaw (Washo)
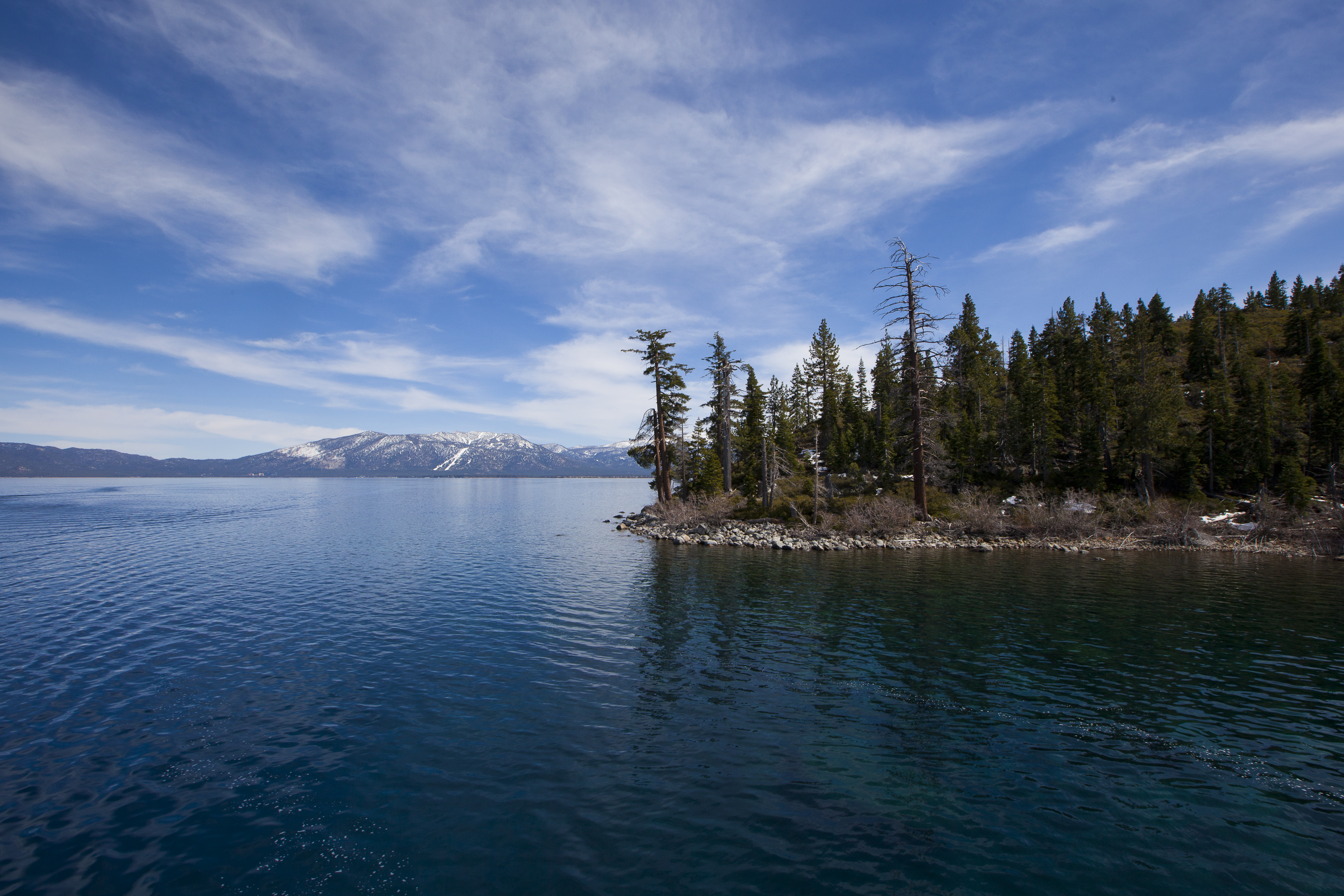
- The south shore of Lake Tahoe in California, as seen from the west shore

- Location of Lake Tahoe in California Location of Lake Tahoe in Nevada Location of Lake Tahoe in the USA

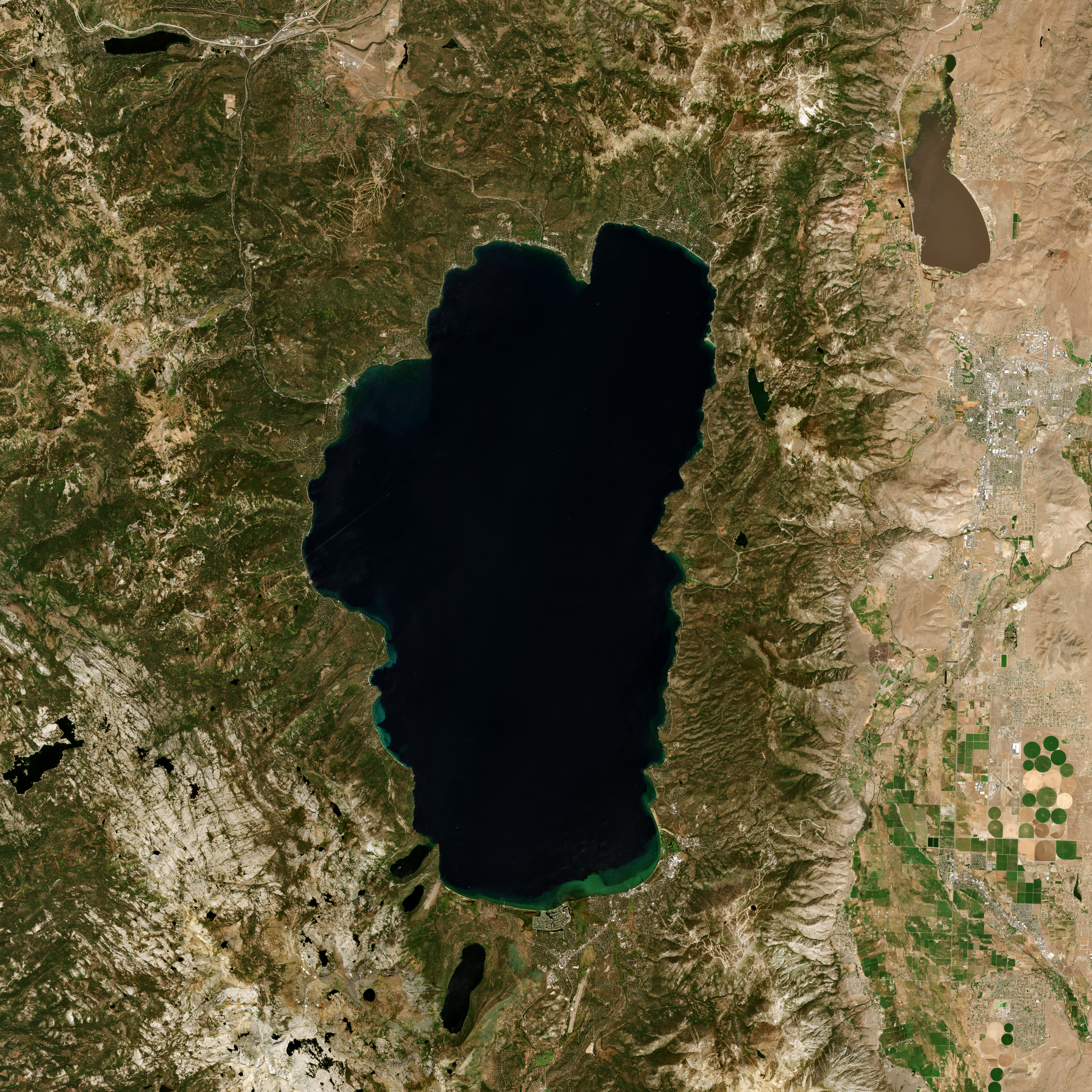
- Lake Tahoe from space
- Location: The Sierra Nevada of the U.S., along the state line of California and Nevada
- Coordinates: 39°N 120°W
- Lake type: Ancient lake, Geologic block faulting
- Primary outflows: Truckee River
- Basin countries: United States
- Max. length: 22 mi (35 km)
- Max. width: 12 mi (19 km)
- Surface area: 191 sq mi (490 km^{2}): Placer County (41%); El Dorado County (29%); Douglas County (13%); Washoe County (11%); Carson City (6%)
- Average depth: 1,000 ft (300 m)
- Max. depth: 1,645 ft (501 m)
- Water volume: 36 cu mi (150 km^{3}; 120,000,000 acre⋅ft)
- Residence time: 650 years
- Shore length^{1}: 71 mi (114 km)
- Surface elevation: 6,225 ft (1,897 m)
- Frozen: Rarely, in Emerald Bay
- Islands: Fannette Island
- Settlements: Incline Village, NV; South Lake Tahoe, CA; Stateline, NV; Tahoe City, CA; Kings Beach, CA; Truckee, CA
- ^{1} Shore length is not a well-defined measure.

Lake Tahoe (/ˈtɑːhoʊ/) is a freshwater lake in the Sierra Nevada of the Western United States, straddling the border between California and Nevada. Lying at 6,225 ft (1,897 m) above sea level, Lake Tahoe is the largest alpine lake in North America, and at 122,160,280 acre⋅ft (150.7 km^{3}) it trails only the five Great Lakes as the largest by volume in the United States. Its depth is 1,645 ft (501 m), making it the second deepest in the United States after Crater Lake in Oregon (1,949 ft or 594 m).

The lake was formed about two million years ago as part of the Lake Tahoe Basin, and its present extent was shaped during the ice ages. It is known for the clarity of its water and the panorama of surrounding mountains on all sides. The area surrounding the lake is also referred to as Lake Tahoe, or simply Tahoe; its English name is derived from its Washo name, Dáʔaw. More than 75% of the lake's watershed is national forest land, covered by the Lake Tahoe Basin Management Unit of the United States Forest Service.

Lake Tahoe is a major tourist attraction in both Nevada and California. It is home to winter sports, summer outdoor recreation, and scenery enjoyed throughout the year. Snow and ski resorts are a significant part of the area's economy and reputation. The Nevada side also offers several lakeside casino resorts, with highways providing year-round access to the entire area.

== Toponym ==
The name for Lake Tahoe derives from the Washo word for the lake, dáʔaw, meaning 'the lake.' Even though dáʔaw is used in the names of other lakes with modifiers (for example, áʔwaku dáʔaw for Pyramid Lake, meaning 'trout lake'), it often is used without a modifier to refer to Lake Tahoe. This may be because of Tahoe's importance to Washo culture.

== Geography ==
Lake Tahoe is the second deepest lake in the U.S., with a maximum depth of 1,645 feet (501 m), trailing Oregon's Crater Lake at 1,949 ft (594 m). Tahoe is the 17th deepest lake in the world, and the sixth deepest in average depth. It is about 22 mi (35 km) long and 12 mi (19 km) wide and has 72 mi (116 km) of shoreline and a surface area of 191 square miles (490 km^{2}). The lake is so large that its surface is noticeably convex due to the curvature of the Earth. At lake level the opposing shorelines are below the horizon at its widest parts; by nearly 100 feet (30 m) at its maximum width, and by some 320 feet (98 m) along its length. Visibility may vary somewhat with atmospheric refraction; when the air temperature is much greater than the lake temperature, looming may occur where the lake surface or opposing shoreline is lifted above the horizon. Fata Morgana may be responsible for Tahoe Tessie sightings.

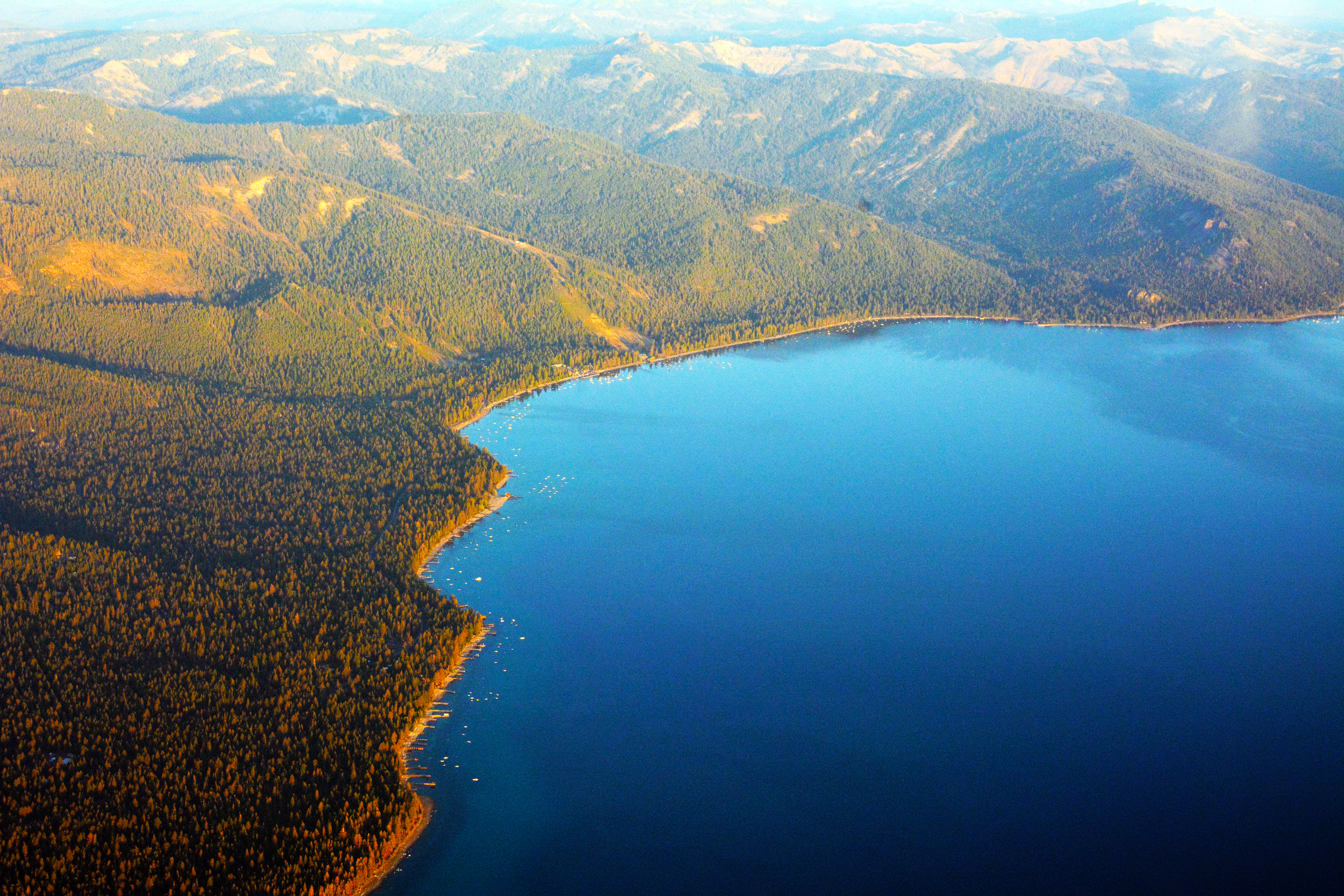
North Lake Tahoe aerial photo

Approximately two-thirds of the shoreline is in California. The south shore is dominated by the lake's largest city, South Lake Tahoe, California, which adjoins the town of Stateline, Nevada, while Tahoe City, California, is located on the lake's northwest shore. Kings Beach, California, and Incline Village, Nevada, anchor the lake's north shore. Although highways run within sight of the lake shore for much of Tahoe's perimeter, many important parts of the shoreline lie within state parks or are protected by the United States Forest Service. The Lake Tahoe Watershed (USGS Huc 18100200) of 505 sq mi (1,310 km^{2}) is the land area that drains to the lake and the Lake Tahoe drainage divide traverses the same general area as the Tahoe Rim Trail.

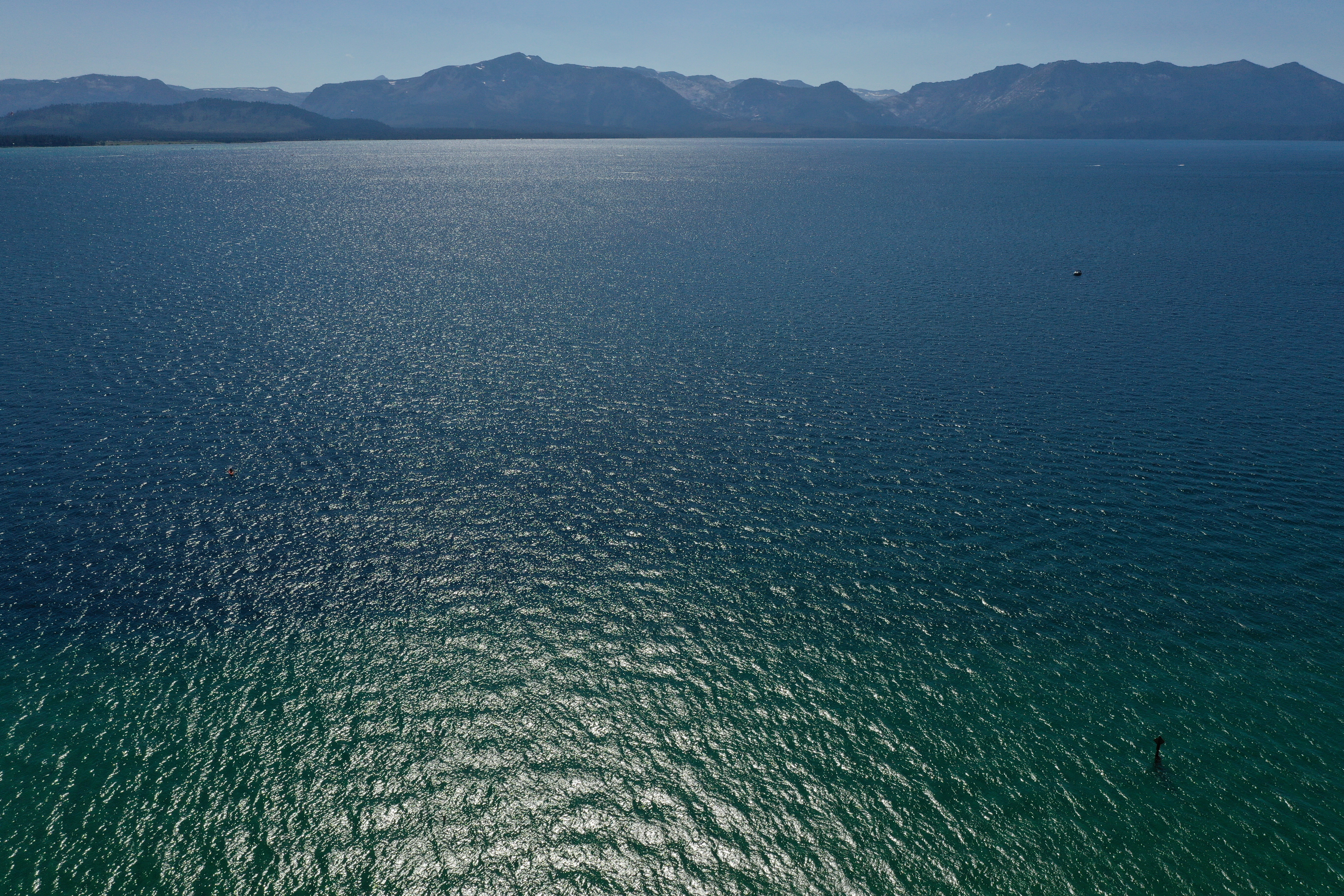
Lake Tahoe, view of California shore from Nevada side

Lake Tahoe is fed by 63 tributaries. These drain an area about the same size as the lake and produce half its water; the other half is produced by direct precipitation.

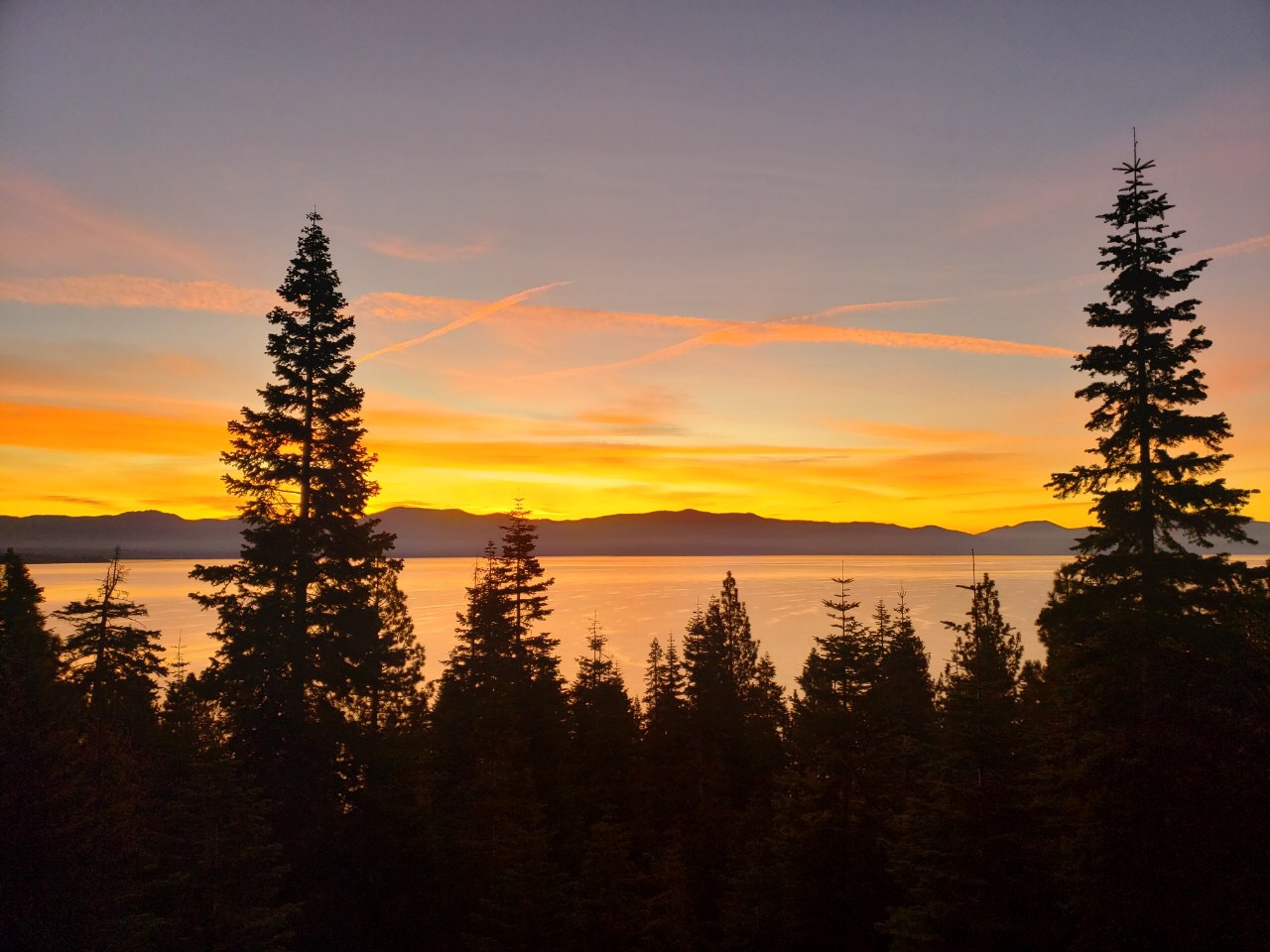
Sunrise over Lake Tahoe

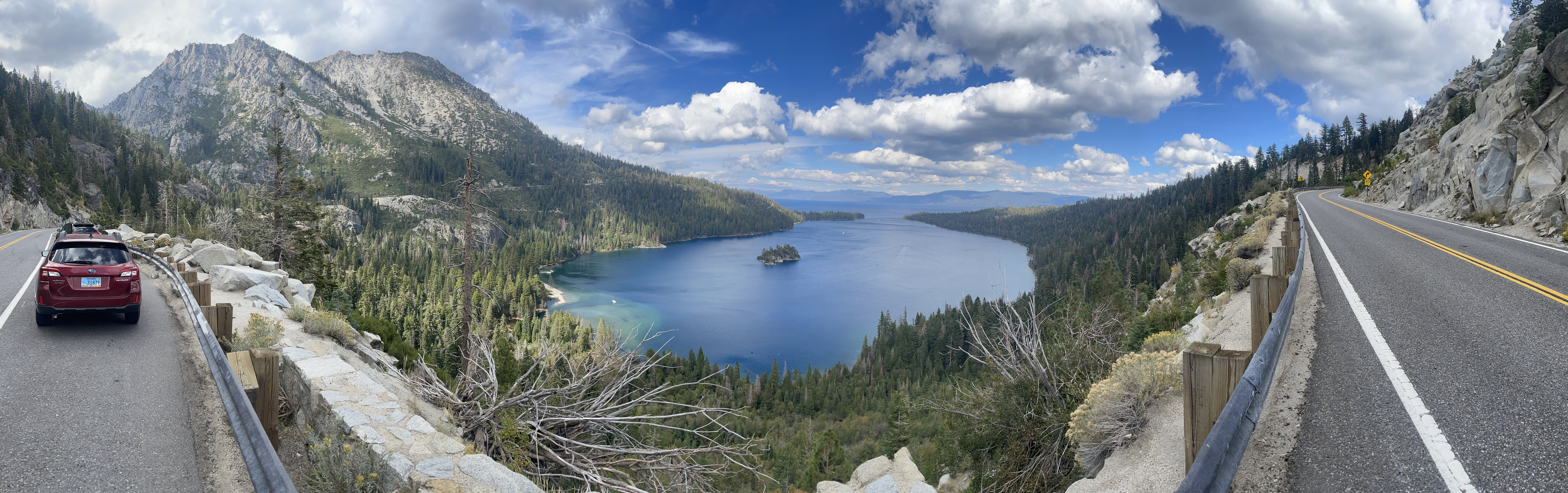
Panorama of Emerald Bay (California) October 2023

The Truckee River is the lake's only outlet, flowing northeast through Reno, Nevada, into Pyramid Lake which has no outlet. It accounts for one third of the water that leaves the lake, the rest evaporating from the lake's surface. Evaporation is thought to account for 40 to 60 percent of the water usage. The flow of the Truckee River and the height of the lake are controlled by Lake Tahoe Dam at the outlet. The natural rim is at 6,223 ft (1,897 m) above sea level. The maximum legal limit to which the lake can be allowed to rise in order to store water is at 6,229.1 ft (1,898.6 m); a spillway at the dam controls overflow. Around New Year 1996/1997 a Pineapple Express atmospheric river melted snow and caused the lake and river to overflow, inundating Reno and surrounding areas.

== Natural history ==
=== Geology ===
The Lake Tahoe Basin was formed by vertical motion (normal) faulting. Uplifted blocks created the Carson Range on the east and the main Sierra Nevada crest on the west. Down-dropping and block tilting (half-grabens) created the Lake Tahoe Basin in between. This kind of faulting is characteristic of the geology of the adjoining Great Basin to the east.

Lake Tahoe is the youngest of several extensional basins of the Walker Lane deformation zone that accommodates nearly 0.47 in (12 mm) per year of dextral shear between the Sierra Nevada-Great Valley Block and the North America plate.

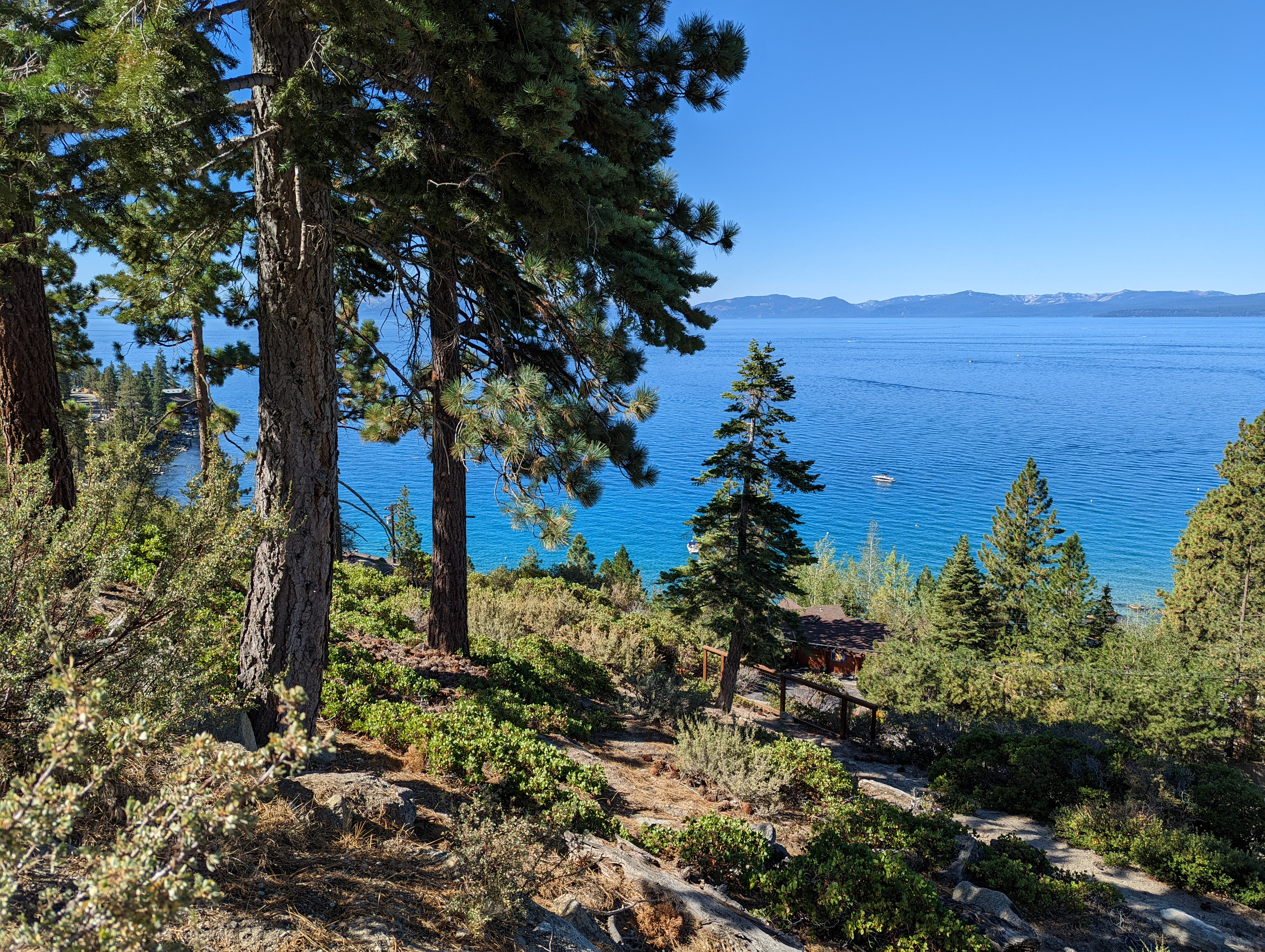
Tunnel Creek Road, Lake Tahoe, Nevada (2022)

Three principal faults form the Lake Tahoe basin: the West Tahoe Fault, aligned between Meyers and Tahoe City, and which is the local segment of the Sierra Nevada Fault, extending on shore north and south of these localities; the Stateline/North Tahoe Fault, starting in the middle of the lake and creating the relief that forms Stateline, NV; and the Incline Village Fault, which runs parallel to the Stateline/North Tahoe Fault offshore and into Incline Village. The West Tahoe Fault appears to be the most active and potentially hazardous fault in the basin. A study in Fallen Leaf Lake, just south of Lake Tahoe, used seafloor mapping techniques to image evidence for paleoearthquakes on the West Tahoe and revealed the last earthquake occurred between 4,100 and 4,500 years ago. Subsequent studies revealed submarine landslides in Fallen Leaf Lake and Lake Tahoe, thought to have been triggered by earthquakes on the West Tahoe fault, and the timing of these events suggests a recurrence interval of 3,000–4,000 years.

Some of the highest peaks of the Lake Tahoe Basin that formed during the process of Lake Tahoe creation are Freel Peak at 10,891 feet (3,320 m), Monument Peak at 10,067 feet (3,068 m), Pyramid Peak at 9,984 feet (3,043 m) (in the Desolation Wilderness), and Mount Tallac at 9,735 feet (2,967 m). The north shore boasts three peaks at over 10,000 feet (3,048 m): Mount Rose at 10,785 feet (3,287 m), Mount Houghton at 10,490 feet (3,197 m) and Relay Peak at 10,388 feet (3,166 m). Mt. Rose is a very popular hiking and backcountry skiing destination.

Eruptions from the now-extinct volcano Mount Pluto formed a volcanic dam on the north side. Melting snow filled the southern and lowest part of the basin to form the ancestral Lake Tahoe. Rain and runoff added additional water.

The Sierra Nevada adjacent to Lake Tahoe were carved by scouring glaciers during the Ice Ages, which began a million or more years ago, and retreated ~15,000 years ago at the end of the Pleistocene. The glaciers carved canyons that are today iconic landmarks such as Emerald Bay, Cascade Lake, and Fallen Leaf Lake, among others. Lake Tahoe itself never held glaciers, but instead water is retained by damming Miocene volcanic deposits.

Soils of the basin come primarily from andesitic volcanic rocks and granodiorite, with minor areas of metamorphic rock. Some of the valley bottoms and lower hill slopes are mantled with glacial moraines, or glacial outwash material derived from the parent rock. Sandy soils, rock outcrops and rubble and stony colluvium account for over 70% of the land area in the basin. The basin soils (in the < 2 mm fraction) are generally 65–85% sand (0.05–2.0 mm).

Given the great depth of Lake Tahoe, and the locations of the normal faults in the deepest portions of the lake, modeling suggests that earthquakes on these faults can trigger tsunamis. Wave heights of these tsunamis are predicted to be on the order of 10 to 33 ft (3 to 10 m) in height, capable of traversing the lake in just a few minutes. A massive collapse of the western edge of the basin that formed McKinney Bay around 50,000 years ago is thought to have generated a tsunami/seiche wave with a height approaching 330 ft (100 m).

=== Climate ===
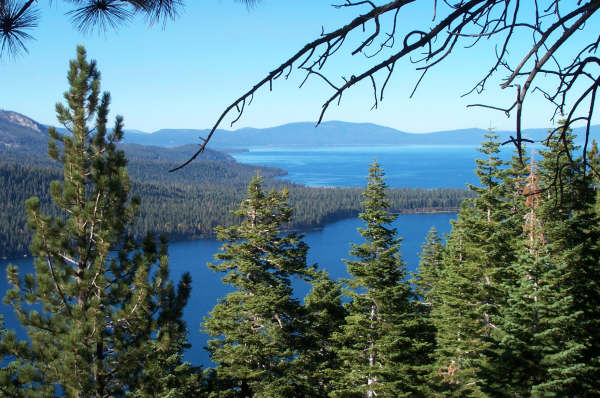
Fallen Leaf Lake and Lake Tahoe in background from Angora Ridge Rd. to the Angora Lakes Resort

Lake Tahoe has a dry-summer continental climate (Dsb in the Köppen climate classification), featuring warm, dry summers and cold winters with heavy snowfall. Mean annual precipitation ranges from over 55 inches (1,400 mm) for watersheds on the west side of the basin to about 26 inches (660 mm) near the lake on the east side of the basin. Most of the precipitation falls as snow between November and April, although rainstorms combined with rapid snowmelt account for the largest floods. There is a pronounced annual runoff of snowmelt in late spring and early summer, the timing of which varies from year to year. In some years, summertime monsoon storms from the Great Basin bring intense rainfall, especially to high elevations on the northeast side of the basin.

August is normally the warmest month at the Lake Tahoe Airport (elevation 6,254 ft; 1,906 m) with an average maximum of 78.7 °F (25.9 °C) and an average minimum of 39.8 °F (4.3 °C). January is the coolest month with an average maximum of 41.0 °F (5.0 °C) and an average minimum of 15.1 °F (−9.4 °C). The all-time maximum of 99 °F (37 °C) was recorded on July 22, 1988. The all-time minimum of −16 °F (−27 °C) was recorded on December 9, 1972. Temperatures exceed 90 °F (32 °C) on an average of 2.0 days annually. Minimum temperatures of 32 °F (0 °C) or lower occur on an average of 231.8 days annually, and minimum temperatures of 0 °F (−18 °C) or lower occur on an average of 7.6 days annually. Freezing temperatures have occurred in every month of the year.

Climate data for Tahoe City, California (Elevation 6,230 ft; 1,900 m)
| Month | Jan | Feb | Mar | Apr | May | Jun | Jul | Aug | Sep | Oct | Nov | Dec | Year |
|---|---|---|---|---|---|---|---|---|---|---|---|---|---|
| Record high °F (°C) | 59 (15) | 60 (16) | 67 (19) | 74 (23) | 89 (32) | 90 (32) | 99 (37) | 94 (34) | 87 (31) | 80 (27) | 70 (21) | 60 (16) | 99 (37) |
| Mean daily maximum °F (°C) | 38.6 (3.7) | 40.3 (4.6) | 44.0 (6.7) | 50.4 (10.2) | 59.6 (15.3) | 68.7 (20.4) | 77.9 (25.5) | 77.2 (25.1) | 69.8 (21.0) | 58.8 (14.9) | 46.9 (8.3) | 40.3 (4.6) | 56.0 (13.3) |
| Mean daily minimum °F (°C) | 19.1 (−7.2) | 19.9 (−6.7) | 22.8 (−5.1) | 26.9 (−2.8) | 32.8 (0.4) | 38.6 (3.7) | 44.4 (6.9) | 43.7 (6.5) | 39.0 (3.9) | 32.3 (0.2) | 25.8 (−3.4) | 20.8 (−6.2) | 30.5 (−0.8) |
| Record low °F (°C) | −14 (−26) | −15 (−26) | −6 (−21) | 5 (−15) | 9 (−13) | 24 (−4) | 22 (−6) | 28 (−2) | 21 (−6) | 9 (−13) | 1 (−17) | −16 (−27) | −16 (−27) |
| Average precipitation inches (mm) | 5.97 (152) | 5.29 (134) | 4.12 (105) | 2.14 (54) | 1.20 (30) | 0.65 (17) | 0.26 (6.6) | 0.30 (7.6) | 0.59 (15) | 1.82 (46) | 3.57 (91) | 5.55 (141) | 31.47 (799) |
| Average snowfall inches (cm) | 45.9 (117) | 36.5 (93) | 35.2 (89) | 15.9 (40) | 3.7 (9.4) | 0.2 (0.51) | 0 (0) | 0 (0) | 0.3 (0.76) | 2.4 (6.1) | 15.5 (39) | 35.2 (89) | 190.7 (484) |
Source: The Western Regional Climate Center

=== Ecology ===
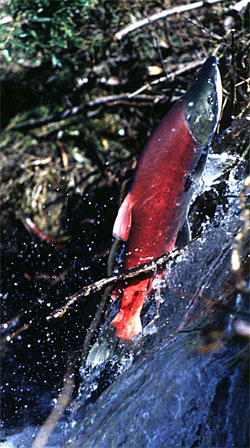
Sockeye salmon (aka Kokanee salmon in Lake Tahoe) jumping a five-foot beaver dam

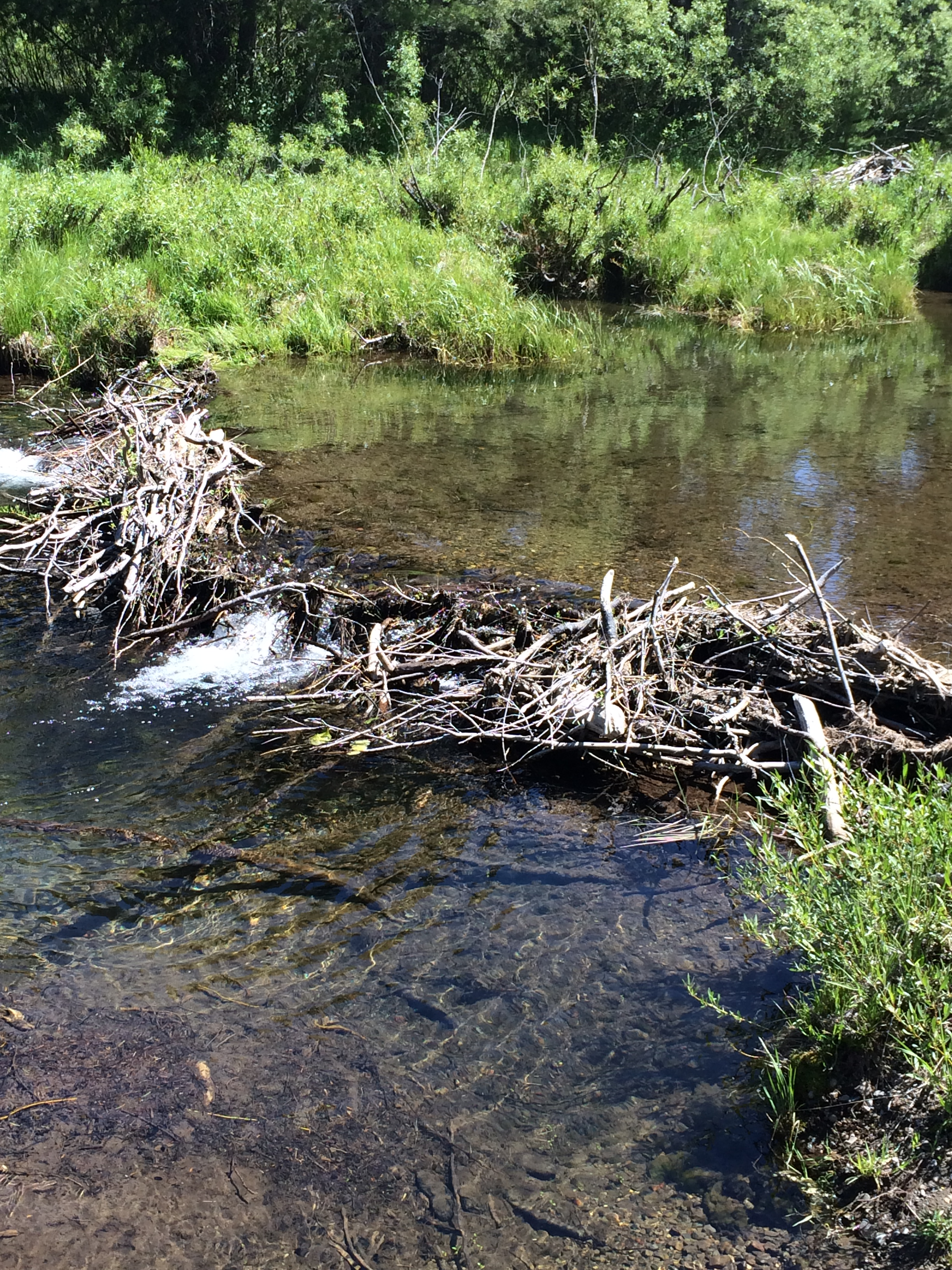
Damaged beaver dam on Blackwood Creek. Beaver dams are easily crossed by trout and their ponds may serve as critical breaks for wildfires.

Vegetation in the basin is dominated by a mixed conifer forest of jeffrey pine (Pinus jeffreyi), lodgepole pine (P. contorta), white fir (Abies concolor), red fir (A. magnifica), sugar pine (P. lambertiana), California incense-cedar (Calocedrus decurrens), ponderosa pine (P. ponderosa), and western white pine (P. monticola). The basin also contains significant areas of wet meadows and riparian areas, dry meadows, brush fields (with Arctostaphylos and Ceanothus) and rock outcrop areas, especially at higher elevations. Ceanothus is capable of fixing nitrogen, but mountain alder (Alnus tenuifolia), which grows along many of the basin's streams, springs and seeps, fixes far greater quantities, and contributes measurably to nitrate-N concentrations in some small streams. The beaches of Lake Tahoe are the only known habitat for the rare Lake Tahoe yellowcress (Rorippa subumbellata), a plant which grows in the wet sand between low- and high-water marks. Vegetation in the lake itself formerly consisted of native Chara and Gomphoneis algae and coontail (Ceratophyllum demersum), but the later introduction of curlyleaf pondweed (Potamogeton crispus), Eurasian watermilfoil (Myriophyllum spicatum), and Zygnema and Cladophora algae has transformed the nearshore environment.

Native fish of the lake include Lahontan cutthroat trout (Oncorhynchus clarki henshawi), mountain whitefish (Prosopiurm williamsoni), Lahontan speckled dace (Rhinichthys osculus robustus), Lahontan redside (Rhinichthys egregious), Lahontan Lake tui chub (Siphateles bicolor pectinifer), Tahoe sucker (Catostomus tahoensis), Lahontan mountain sucker (Catostomus platyrhynchus lahontan), and Paiute sculpin (Cottus beldingi). Most of these fish populations have been significantly reduced due to the introduction of nonnative fish, Asian clam (Corbicula fluminea), and mysid shrimp. Competition from introduced fish led cutthroat trout to be completely extirpated from the lake in the early 20th century until reintroduction efforts started in 2019.

Introduced fish species include lake trout (Salvelinus namaycush), rainbow trout (Oncorhynchus mykiss gairdneri), sockeye salmon (Oncorhyncus nerka), brown trout (Salmo trutta), brook trout (Salvelinus fontinalis), common carp (Cyprinus carpio), golden shiner (Notemigonus crysoleucas), western mosquitofish (Gambusia affinis), bluegill (Lepomis macrochirus), black (Pomoxis nigromaculatus) and white (P. annularis) crappie, largemouth (Micropterus salmoides) and smallmouth (Micropterus dolomieu) bass, and brown bullhead (Ameiurus nebulosus). Each autumn, from late September through mid-October, mature sockeye salmon transform from silver-blue color to a fiery vermilion, and run up Taylor Creek, near South Lake Tahoe. As spawning season approaches the fish acquire a humpback and protuberant jaw. After spawning they die and their carcasses provide a feast for gatherings of mink (Neogale vison), bears (Ursus americanus), and bald eagles (Haliaeetus leucocephalus). The non-native salmon were transplanted from the North Pacific to Lake Tahoe in 1944.

North American beaver (Castor canadensis) were re-introduced to the Tahoe Basin by the California Department of Fish and Wildlife and the U.S. Forest Service between 1934 and 1949. Descended from no more than nine individuals, 1987 beaver populations on the upper and lower Truckee River had reached a density of 0.72 colonies (3.5 beavers) per kilometer. At the present time beaver have been seen in Tahoe Keys, Taylor Creek, Meeks Creek at Meeks Bay on the western shore, and Kings Beach on the north shore, so the descendants of the original nine beavers have apparently migrated around most of Lake Tahoe. Recently novel physical evidence has demonstrated that beaver were native to the Sierra until at least the mid-nineteenth century, via radiocarbon dating of buried beaver dam wood uncovered by deep channel incision in the Feather River watershed. That report was supported by a summary of indirect evidence of beaver including reliable observer accounts of beaver in multiple watersheds from the northern to the southern Sierra Nevada, including its eastern slope. A specific documented record of beaver living historically in Lake Tahoe's North Canyon Creek watershed above Glenbrook includes a description of Spooner Meadow rancher Charles Fulstone hiring a caretaker to control the beaver population in the early 20th century. A recent study of Taylor Creek showed that beaver dam removal decreased wetland habitat, increased stream flow, and increased total phosphorus pollutants entering Lake Tahoe – all factors which negatively impact the clarity of the lake's water. In addition, beaver dams located in Ward Creek, located on the west shore of Lake Tahoe, were also shown to decrease nutrients and sediments traveling downstream.

The lake's low temperatures and extreme depth can slow the decomposition rate of organic matter. For example, the almost perfectly preserved body of a diver was found at a depth of 300 feet (90 m) 17 years after he went missing.

== Human history ==
=== Native peoples ===
The Washoe Native Americans (wá·šiw) are the original inhabitants of the Lake Tahoe Basin. Lake Tahoe was the center and heart of Washoe Indian territory, including the upper valleys of the Walker, Carson and Truckee Rivers. They practiced seasonal migrations between the Sierra Nevada and surrounding valleys and cultivated a reciprocal relationship with the land for thousands of years. The discovery of the Comstock Lode in 1859 and the growth of mining centers such as Virginia City, Nevada brought significant environmental and social changes to the region. Extensive logging operations removed forests to support mining infrastructure, while settler expansion disrupted traditional Washoe lifeways and displaced them from ancestral lands. Although the Washoe Tribe maintains enduring cultural and historical connections to the basin, they do not possess legal title to the shores of Lake Tahoe.

Washoe (wá·šiw) tradition holds that the people were brought to the Lake Tahoe Basin by Coyote (géwe) and instructed by nentʼúšu that this was their destined homeland. nentʼúšu directed the plants, animals, and medicines of the region to flourish to sustain the people, while emphasizing their responsibility to care for and maintain balance with the land. Lake Tahoe (dáɁaw) is regarded as both the geographic and spiritual center of the Washoe world, and the people identify themselves as waší·šiw, meaning "the people from here." Traditionally, the Washoe were organized into family-based groups that formed larger bands distributed throughout their territory. Each band was associated with a specific region and exhibited distinct variations in language and cultural practices. Washoe lifeways followed a seasonal cycle closely tied to environmental conditions. During the summer, communities gathered in the Sierra Nevada, including the Lake Tahoe area, where fish such as Lahontan cutthroat trout, freshwater clams, and other resources provided sustenance. People also gathered plants for food, tools, and medicine throughout the territory. In the fall, groups traveled to the pine nut hills to harvest piñon nuts (tʼágɨm) and to the western slopes of the Sierra Nevada to collect acorns (máluŋ). This season also involved communal hunting activities, including organized rabbit drives, which provided meat and materials for winter. During winter, the Washoe relocated to lower-elevation valleys where conditions were less severe. With the onset of spring and the melting snow, communities returned to higher elevations. This cyclical pattern of movement sustained Washoe society for generations.

Cave Rock is a large rock formation located on the southeastern shore of the lake and considered a sacred site for the Washoe Indians. The Washoe people called Cave Rock deʔek wadapuš (Washo for Standing Gray Rock). Part of why the Washoe felt the Cave was sacred was due to "The Lady of the Lake" a rock formation on the side of the Cave which looks like the profile of a woman's face gazing out towards the lake. Washoe ancestors performed religious ceremonies inside the cave. There were significant but ultimately unsuccessful protests from the tribe when a tunnel was blasted through the rock in 1931 for Highway 50.

=== Exploration and naming ===
Lt. John C. Frémont was the first European-American to see Lake Tahoe, during his second exploratory expedition on February 14, 1844. Fremont named it "Lake Bonpland" after Aimé Bonpland (a French botanist who had accompanied Prussian explorer Alexander von Humboldt in his exploration of Mexico, Colombia and the Amazon River). Lake Bonpland's usage never became popular, and the name changed from "Mountain Lake" to "Fremont's Lake" several years after. John Calhoun Johnson, Sierra explorer and founder of "Johnson's Cutoff" (now U.S. Route 50), named it Fallen Leaf Lake after his Indian guide. Johnson's first job in the west was in the government service carrying the mail on snowshoes from Placerville to Nevada City, during which time he named it "Lake Bigler" after California's third governor John Bigler. In 1853 William Eddy, the surveyor general of California, identified the lake as Lake Bigler.

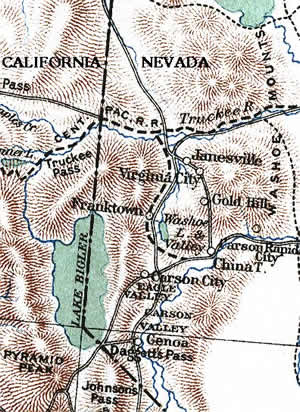
An 1860s map of "Lake Bigler" during the name controversy

The usage never became universal. By the start of the American Civil War in 1861, former Governor Bigler, once a Free Soil Democrat, had become such an ardent Confederate sympathizer that Union advocates objected to the name. Unionists and Republicans alike derided the former governor's name on the lake on official state maps. Pro-Union papers called for a "change from this Secesh appellation" and "no Copperhead names on our landmarks for us." Several Unionist members in the Legislature suggested changing the name to the fanciful sounding "Tula Tulia". The Sacramento Union jokingly suggested the name "Largo Bergler" for Bigler's widely perceived financial incompetency in his final term and contemporary Southern sympathies. Within a year, different maps referred to the lake not only as Bigler, but also as "Mountain Lake" and "Maheon Lake".

The debate took a new direction when William Henry Knight, mapmaker for the federal U.S. Department of the Interior, and colleague Dr. Henry DeGroot of the Sacramento Union joined the political argument in 1862. As Knight completed a new map of the lake, the mapmaker asked DeGroot for a new name of the lake. DeGroot suggested "Tahoe", a local tribal name he believed meant "water in a high place". Knight agreed, and telegraphed to the Land Office in Washington, D.C., to officially change all federal maps to now read "Lake Tahoe". Knight later explained his desire for a name change, writing, "I remarked (to many) that people had expressed dissatisfaction with the name "Bigler", bestowed in honor of a man who had not distinguished himself by any single achievement, and I thought now would be a good time to select an appropriate name and fix it forever on that beautiful sheet of water."

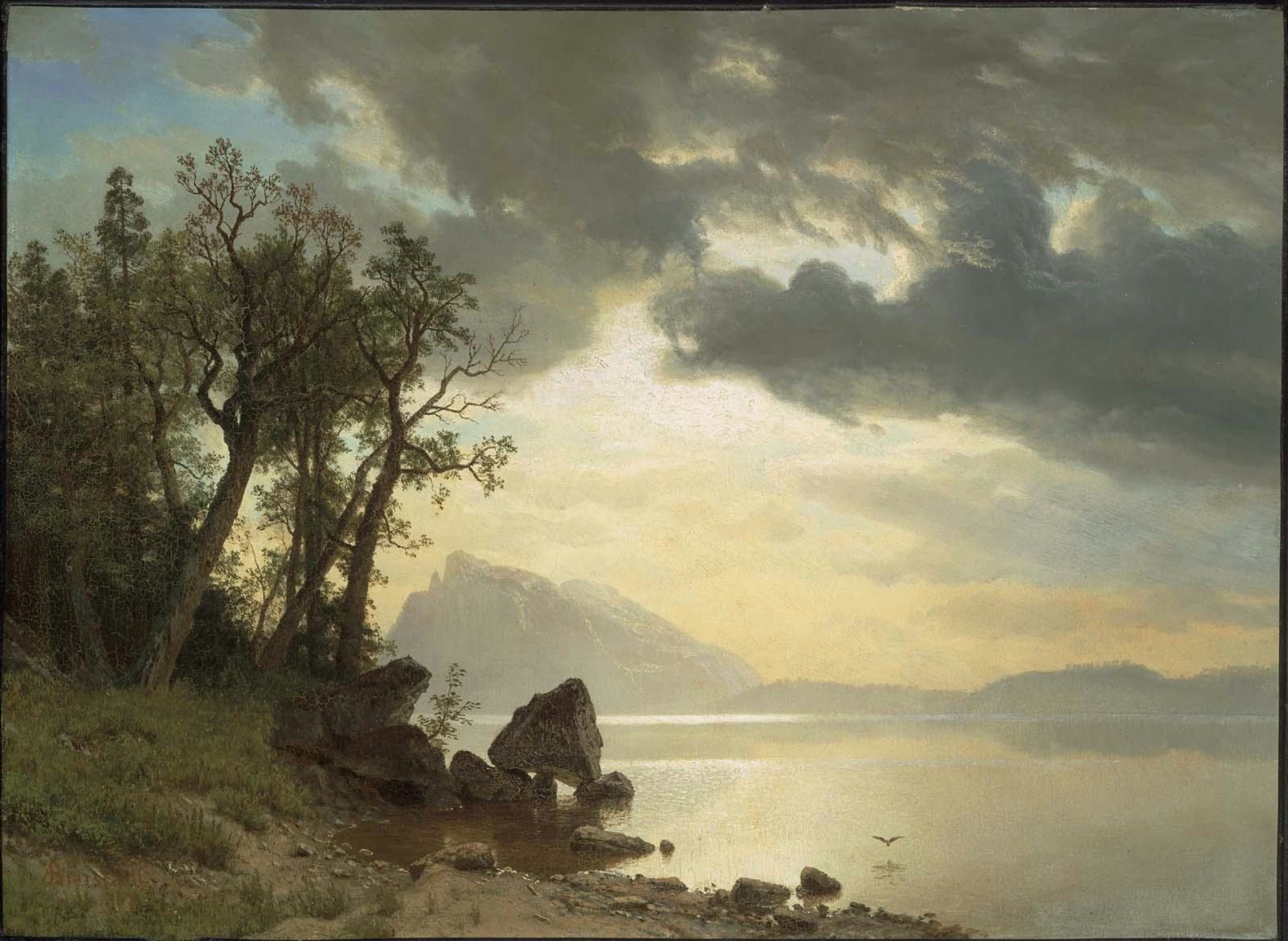
Albert Bierstadt, Lake Tahoe, California, 1867

"Lake Tahoe", also like "Lake Bigler", did not gain universal acceptance. Mark Twain, a critic of the new name, called it an "unmusical cognomen". In an 1864 editorial regarding the name in the Virginia City Territorial Enterprise, Twain cited Bigler as being "the legitimate name of the Lake, and it will be retained until some name less flat, insipid and spooney than "Tahoe" is invented for it." In Twain's 1869 novel Innocents Abroad, Twain continued to deride the name in his foreign travels. "People say that Tahoe means 'Silver Lake' – 'Limpid Water' – 'Falling Leaf.' Bosh! It means grasshopper soup, the favorite dish of the digger tribe – and of the Paiutes as well." The Placerville Mountain Democrat began a notorious rumor that "Tahoe" was actually an Indian renegade who plundered upon White settlers. To counter the federal government, the California State Legislature reaffirmed in 1870 that the lake was indeed called "Lake Bigler".

But to most surveys and the general public it was known as Lake Tahoe. By the end of the 19th century "Lake Bigler" had nearly completely fallen out of popular use in favor of "Tahoe". The California State Legislature reversed its previous decision in 1945, officially changing the name to Lake Tahoe.

=== Mining era ===
Upon discovery of gold in the South Fork of the American River in 1848, thousands of gold seekers going west passed near the basin on their way to the gold fields. Europeans first impinged upon the Lake Tahoe basin with the 1858 discovery of the Comstock Lode, a silver deposit just 15 miles (24 km) to the east in Virginia City, Nevada. From 1858 until about 1890, logging in the basin supplied large timbers to shore up the underground workings of the Comstock mines. The logging was so extensive that loggers cut down almost all of the native forest.

Lake Tahoe became a transportation hub for the surrounding area as mining and logging commenced prior to development of railroads. The first mail delivery was via a sailboat which took a week to visit each of the lakeside communities. The first steamboat on Lake Tahoe was the 42-foot (13 m) paddle wheel tugboat Governor Blasdel towing log rafts to a sawmill on the south side of Glenbrook Bay from 1863 until her boiler exploded in 1877. The 40-foot (12 m) Truckee and 55-foot (17 m) propeller-driven Emerald were also towing log rafts in 1870. J.A. Todman brought steam-powered passenger service to Lake Tahoe in 1872 with the 100-foot (30 m) 125-passenger side-wheel steamer Governor Stanford which reduced the mail delivery trip around Lake Tahoe to eight hours. Todman expanded service with steamboats Mamie, Niagara, and Tod Goodwin. Lawrence & Comstock provided competition with their steel-hulled steamboat Tallac in 1890 and later purchased Todman's steamboats Mamie and Tod Goodwin. The Carson and Tahoe Lumber and Fluming Company purchased the 83-foot (25 m) Niagara and built the iron-hulled steamboats Meteor in 1876 and Emerald (II) in 1887. The 75-foot (23 m) Meteor was the fastest boat on Lake Tahoe with a speed of 22 miles (35 km) per hour. Lake Tahoe Railway and Transportation Company dominated the passenger and mail route after launch of their 200-passenger steamboat Tahoe on June 24, 1896. The 154-ton Tahoe was 170 feet (52 m) long with a slender 18-foot (5.5 m) beam so her 1,200 horsepower (890 kW) engines could push her over the lake at 18.5 knots. Lake Tahoe Railway and Transportation Company purchased Tallac and rebuilt her as Nevada with length increased by 20 feet (6.1 m) to serve as a backup steamboat when Tahoe required maintenance.

Tod Goodwin burned at Tallac, and most of the other steamboats were retired as the sawmills ran out of trees and people began traveling by automobile. Niagara was scrapped at Tahoe City in 1900. Governor Stanford was beached at Glenbrook where its boiler was used until 1942 heating cottages at Glenbrook Inn and Ranch. Steamboats continued to carry a mail clerk around Lake Tahoe until 1934, when the mail contract was given to the 42-foot (13 m) motorboat Marian B powered by two Chevrolet engines. Mail delivery moved ashore after the Marian B was lost on May 17, 1941, when her owner and the mail clerk attempted mail delivery during a storm. The 60-foot (18 m) Emerald (II) left Lake Tahoe in 1935 to become a fishing boat in San Diego. Historic Tahoe, Nevada, and Meteor were purchased with hope they might be preserved; but were scuttled in deep water after deterioration made preservation impractical. The latter two lie in Glenbrook Bay, but Tahoe sank in deeper water.

=== Development ===
Even in the mining era, the potential of the basin as a tourist destination was recognized. Tahoe City was founded in 1864 as a resort community for Virginia City.

On April 13, 1898, President William McKinley proclaimed "The Lake Tahoe Forest Reserve" (31 Stat. 1953). Public appreciation of the Tahoe basin grew, and during the 1912, 1913 and 1918 Congressional sessions, congressmen tried unsuccessfully to designate the basin as a national park.

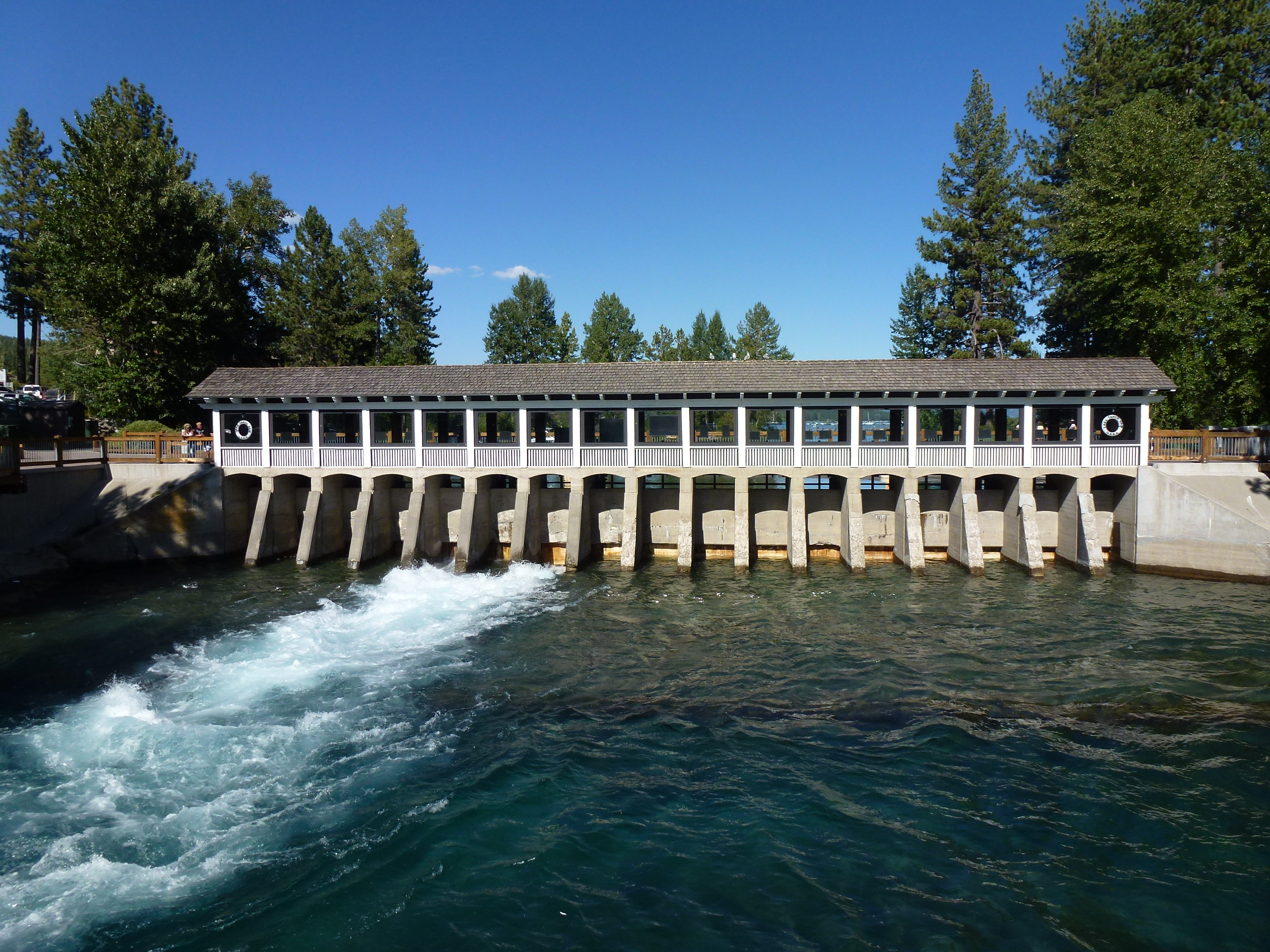
The only outlet of Lake Tahoe and the headwaters of the Truckee River at Lake Tahoe Dam

While Lake Tahoe is a natural lake, it is also used for water storage by the Truckee-Carson Irrigation District (TCID). The lake level is controlled by Lake Tahoe Dam built in 1913 at the lake's only outlet, the Truckee River, at Tahoe City. The 18-foot (5.5 m) high dam can increase the lake's capacity by 744,600 acre⋅ft (918,500,000 m^{3}).

During the first half of the 20th century, development around the lake consisted of a few vacation homes. The post-World War II population and building boom, followed by construction of gambling casinos in the Nevada part of the basin during the mid-1950s, and completion of the interstate highway links for the 1960 Winter Olympics held at Olympic Valley (then known as "Squaw Valley"), resulted in a dramatic increase in development within the basin. From 1960 to 1980, the permanent residential population increased from about 10,000 to greater than 50,000, and the summer population grew from about 10,000 to about 90,000. Since the 1980s, development has slowed due to controls on land use.

=== Government and politics ===
==== Interstate boundary dispute ====
Lake Tahoe is divided by the prominent interstate boundary between California and Nevada, where the two states' edges make their iconic directional turn near the middle of the lake. This boundary has been disputed since the mid-nineteenth century.

As part of the compromise of 1850, California was speedily admitted to the Union. In doing so, Congress approved the California Constitution which defined the state's boundary in reference to geographical coordinates. This includes the section of the 120th meridian that is between the 42nd parallel at the Oregon border and the 39th parallel amid Lake Tahoe, and an oblique line continuing from that point southward to where the Colorado River crosses the 35th parallel. Fourteen years later, Congress approved the Nevada Constitution when it was admitted as a state in 1864, which defined its western border at the forty third degree of Longitude West from Washington, D.C., and its southwestern border along the oblique section of the boundary line of California. While 43 degrees of longitude west from the Washington Meridian does not really coincide with the 120 degrees longitude west of Greenwich, the 1864 Congress was of the belief that the two lines were identical; the former was abandoned nationally in 1884. The centuries long dispute that erupted began with boundary discrepancies across many surveys within which were valuable mineral deposits; Nevada also had a wish that California would assent to cede its land east of the Pacific crest as had been preauthorized by Congress in 1850. The first consequential attempt to mark the California-Nevada boundary was the 1863 J.F. Houghton and Butler Ives line. An 1867–1868 survey of the California-Oregon border by Daniel G. Major for the United States General Land Office found the 120th meridian more than two miles west of the prior line, so it was followed by the 1872 survey by Alexey W. Von Schmidt. Against initial instructions, Von Schmidt began his survey with the 1872 California-Nevada State Boundary Marker which was six-tenths of a mile east of the Houghton-Ives line. When he discovered the Colorado River had shifted at the 35th parallel, he simply changed the endpoint resulting in a survey that was neither straight nor accurate. Substantial doubts led Congress in 1892 to fund the United States Coast and Geodetic Survey to remark the oblique line. This new survey found the Von Schmidt line to be 1,600 to 1,800 feet too far west, but both surveys were then used by both states. Unsurprisingly, the combination of the 1893 C.G.S. survey's oblique line and Schmidt's well marked north–south line do not intersect precisely at the 39th parallel as mandated by the California Constitution. Congress does not have the constitutional power to unilaterally move state boundaries.

The wealth in natural resources between the Sierra Crest and the easternmost sections of survey lines created a powerful source for conflict. Major mining sites in the Tahoe area were in disputed territory. In a striking display of opportunism which ostensibly occurred because the boundary was still "officially" unsurveyed, settlers arrogated parts of California up to the irregular Sierra Crest tens of miles east of the boundary—defined over six years prior—in an attempt to create Nataqua Territory. An armed skirmish known as the Sagebrush War included gunshots exchanged between militia. Even after six surveys, conflict remained over which of them, if any, were legally binding in marking the boundary; this was partially heard by the Supreme Court of the United States in 1980, where the doctrine of acquiescence was invoked.

A boundary defined in terms of geographical coordinates is theoretically precise, but poses pragmatic challenges to implement. Where a particular coordinate actually lies on the surface of the earth is dependent on the figure of the Earth. In the mid-1800s the Bessel ellipsoid of 1841 or the Clarke ellipsoid of 1866 were widely used; the Hayford ellipsoid of 1910 may later have been used by the United States Coast and Geodetic Survey. The standard ellipsoid for western states in 1849—which is generally congruent with that year's version of the Astronomical Almanac—is implicit in California's constitutional boundary definition; incessant invention of new datums by new and potentially interested parties do not re-render the old boundary definition. Holding assumptions of the earth back-in-time, modern satellite assisted survey techniques can determine location and transform them onto old ellipsoids to within a centimeter. Celestial navigation techniques by contrast, are accurate up to two-fifths of a mile; uncertainty in the latter was known, but precision then was unobtainable.

The legacy of this dispute continues. There is an official federal obelisk-shaped monument marking the oblique California border, which is now surrounded by Edgewood Tahoe golf resort that is claimed and taxed by Nevada. A federal survey monument was removed to the Lake Tahoe Historical Society circa 2018. The Von Schmidt line crosses US 50 on the west edge of present-day Applebee's, and the east edge of the Marcus Ashley Gallery in Tahoe Crescent V Shopping Center. The Nevada community of Stateline has been moved east. A 2026 Tahoe Tribune article wrongly sourced the genesis of the conflict to crude cartoon hachure maps of very sparse pathfinding paths plotted with faulty chronometer data obtained on John C. Frémont's third expedition which occurred not only before Mexican Cession, but before the 1846–1848 Mexican-American War itself and hence well before 1848 Provisional California could have even had U.S. territorial borders. Any dispute of whether the lake was entirely on one side of the border or the other had been clearly settled by the time of the Pacific Railroad Surveys. A semi-permanent astronomical station had been established where the Upper Truckee River marsh met the lake in-part to precisely establish the border, as well as one on the summit of Round Top. Additionally, Douglas County, Nevada which strategically forms the western edge where the interstate border iconically changes directions, is named after Stephen A. Douglas who was famously the main national proponent of the doctrine of popular sovereignty — a notorious policy which caused bleeding Kansas — to resolve the slavery issue, which is viewed as an implicit reflection of the role slavery aspirations played in fueling the boundary dispute; nevertheless, Nevada was ultimately admitted as a free state during southern succession.

The boundary splits Lake Tahoe unevenly, with two-thirds in California and one-third in Nevada. In California, Lake Tahoe is divided between Placer County and El Dorado County. In Nevada, Lake Tahoe is divided among Washoe County, Douglas County and Carson City (an independent city).

==== Shorezone and beach ownership ====
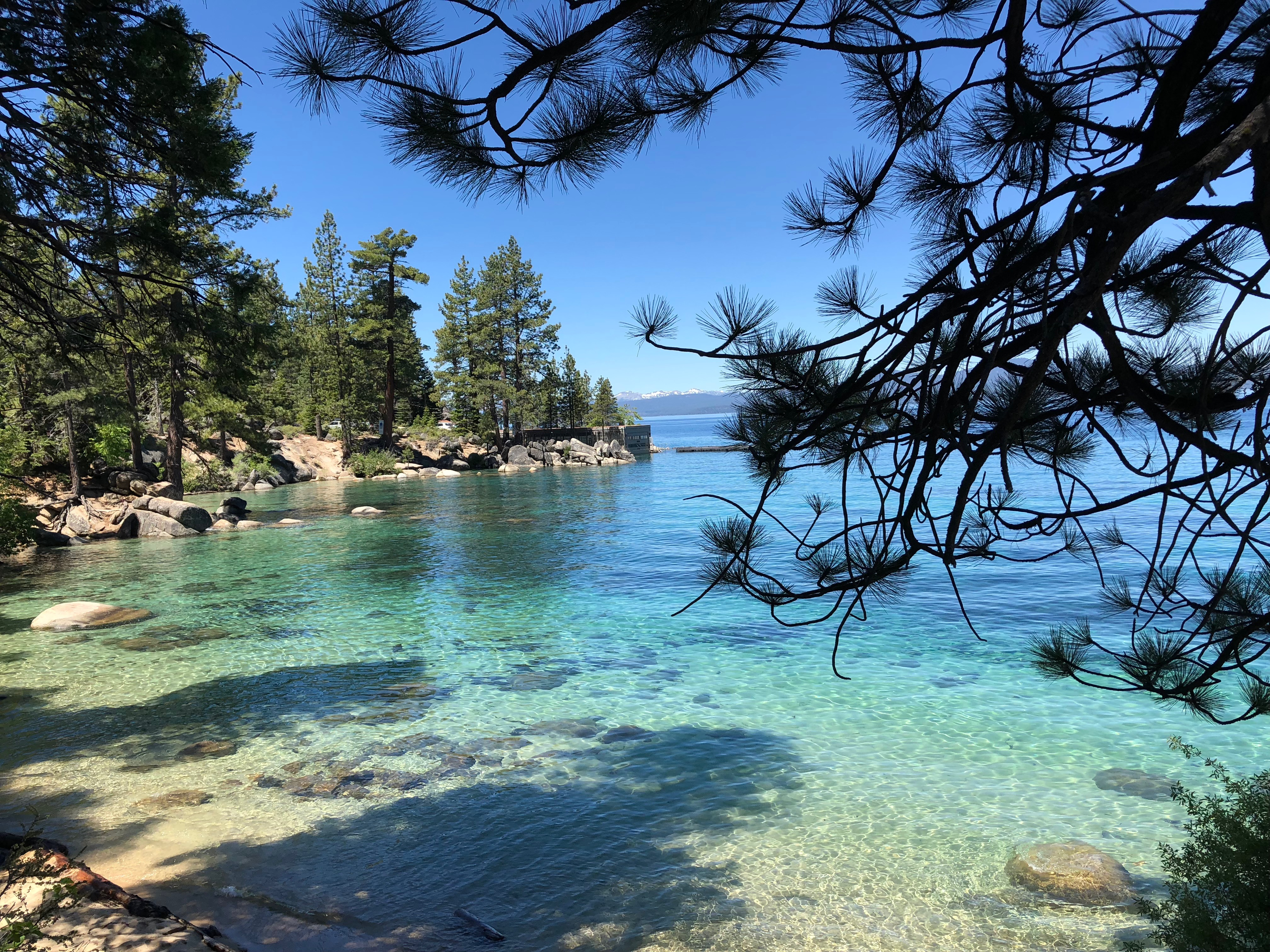
Lake Tahoe Beach

Lake Tahoe is a U.S. Navigable Waterway, under federal jurisdiction, and the public is allowed to occupy any watercraft as close to any shore as the craft is navigable. Public capacity to navigate across any land formerly inundated by the waterway is not extinguished by the lowering of the lake level; this federal easement is maintained under United States law. Because small fluctuations in the height of the shoreline can result in substantive temporal immersions by the lake surface, the irreversible public easement slowly grows larger in size.

While the submerged lands generally belong to the state, the water held in the lake is federally controlled by the US Bureau of Reclamation, and immersion of the shoreline itself would be a common law trespass against east lakefront property owners if it were not for the land—below the theoretical maximum elevation of the lake—being in a perpetual federal easement. Neither state has the authority to rescind navigability along the shoreline below the highmark of the waterbody, because it has been granted under federal law through the Enumerated powers of the United States. The entire waterbody is navigable; it is common for the majority of users to be operating negligible draft one-person craft such as kayaks and standup paddleboards. The Tahoe Regional Planning Agency does not have the authority to override existing federal law even if it was also created by Congress.

Like the interstate boundary itself, the high watermark has been disputed as well. The theoretical maximum elevation of the lake is 6,229.1 feet (1,898.6 m), using the Lake Tahoe datum. The yearly maximum is commonly 0.35 feet (0.11 m) lower. Strong winds across the lake's substantial fetch can create a surge which further lifts the high-water line on leeward shores, known as a seiche.

===== California side =====
On the California side, the shorezone is expressly maintained in a constitutionally and statutorily protected public trust, analogous to an easement, which is managed by the California State Lands Commission and under a concurrent federal easement. As public land, the shorezone on this side may be used for nearly any purpose, rather than just travel. Upland owner is not entitled to utilize their land subject to public trust in any manner incompatible with public's interest in the property—which includes broad recreational uses. Owner is akin to a trustee of public trust for benefit of all the people, and as such has fiduciary responsibilities to the beneficiaries; state remains trustee with duty to supervise trust. It is both civilly unlawful as well as a crime for anyone to hinder, prevent, or obstruct free passage over the public streets, state lands, trusts, easements, or federal public easement. For a passage to the lake to constitute as a "private driveway" subject to the exclusion of the public, the underlying lands must be within the property lines bounding the property of a denominated parcel on map filed with county recorder of which land is held as a way or place in private ownership.

Building new piers can infringe on the public trust, which among many things, is purposed to preserve the land in its natural state. Accretions created in the shorezone by artificial means remain as public land because they are part of the public trust. The private Lakeside Park Association has made such an artificial accretion of land that is freely open for public use. Access to and from the shorezone across private land on publicly enjoyed paths is by right-of-way or prescriptive easement. Recent attempts by Lakefront Homeowners to use piers as "easement fences" to obstruct beach travel are encroaching centuries of established easement and admiralty law.

===== Nevada side =====
Nevada local governments have in some cases successfully limited access to publicly held lands above the high water mark. The accessibility of the Nevada beach-land below the high watermark has been a practical matter rather than a legal issue. The land is a public trust or easement under the Rivers and Harbors Act, the Submerged Lands Act, the several Coast Guard Authorization Acts, but affluent beachfront landowners and their elected civic leaders maintain the land is effectively private under state law because state law enforcement is not charged with enforcing federal law. They dispute the high water mark itself by arguing that the state of Nevada has not agreed to either a highwater level or datum with California and the US. Some Civic leaders for the Nevada shore have been pushing a frivolous states rights theory of property law—which intermittently nullifies federal easements whenever the lake level recedes—which has never been tested in federal court. Instilling public fear of criminal trespassing is the core goal under the theory, which if actually prosecuted would be a risky power play. The sheriffs in Nevada are elected officials; false arrest can lead to an official's imprisonment and cost their electorate hundreds of thousands of dollars. To be convicted of trespassing, one must be beyond reasonable doubt above the highwater mark, which under their states rights theory is an arbitrary fact to be found. The land is concurrently claimed by the Nevada Department of Conservation and Natural Resources (Nevada Division of State Lands). It is a crime to prevent or obstruct use of Nevada state lands.

==== Protection ====
As the population grew and development expanded in the 1960s, the question of protecting the lake became more imperative. In 1969, the U.S. Congress and the California and Nevada State Legislatures created a unique compact to share resources and responsibilities. The Compact established the Tahoe Regional Planning Agency (TRPA), a bi-state agency charged with environmental protection of the Basin through land-use regulation and planning. In 1980, the U.S. Congress amended the Compact with public law 96-551. The law designated a new agency, the Tahoe Transportation District (TTD), to facilitate and implement Basin and regional transportation improvements/additions for the protection, restoration and use of the lake. Schisms between both agencies and local residents have led to the formation of grass-roots organizations that hold to even stricter environmentalism.

=== Historical locations ===
Lake Tahoe is also the location of several 19th and 20th century palatial homes of historical significance. The Thunderbird Lodge built by George Whittel Jr once included nearly 27 miles (43 km) of the Nevada shoreline. Vikingsholm was the original settlement on Emerald Bay and included an island teahouse and a 38-room home. The Ehrman Mansion is a summer home built by a former Wells Fargo president in Sugar Pine Point and is now a state park. The Pony Express had a route that went from Genoa Station over Daggett Pass to Friday's Station and Yanks Station; it succeeded the route through Woodford's Station and Fountain Place Station both on the way to Strawberry Station.

== Environmental issues ==
=== Water quality ===
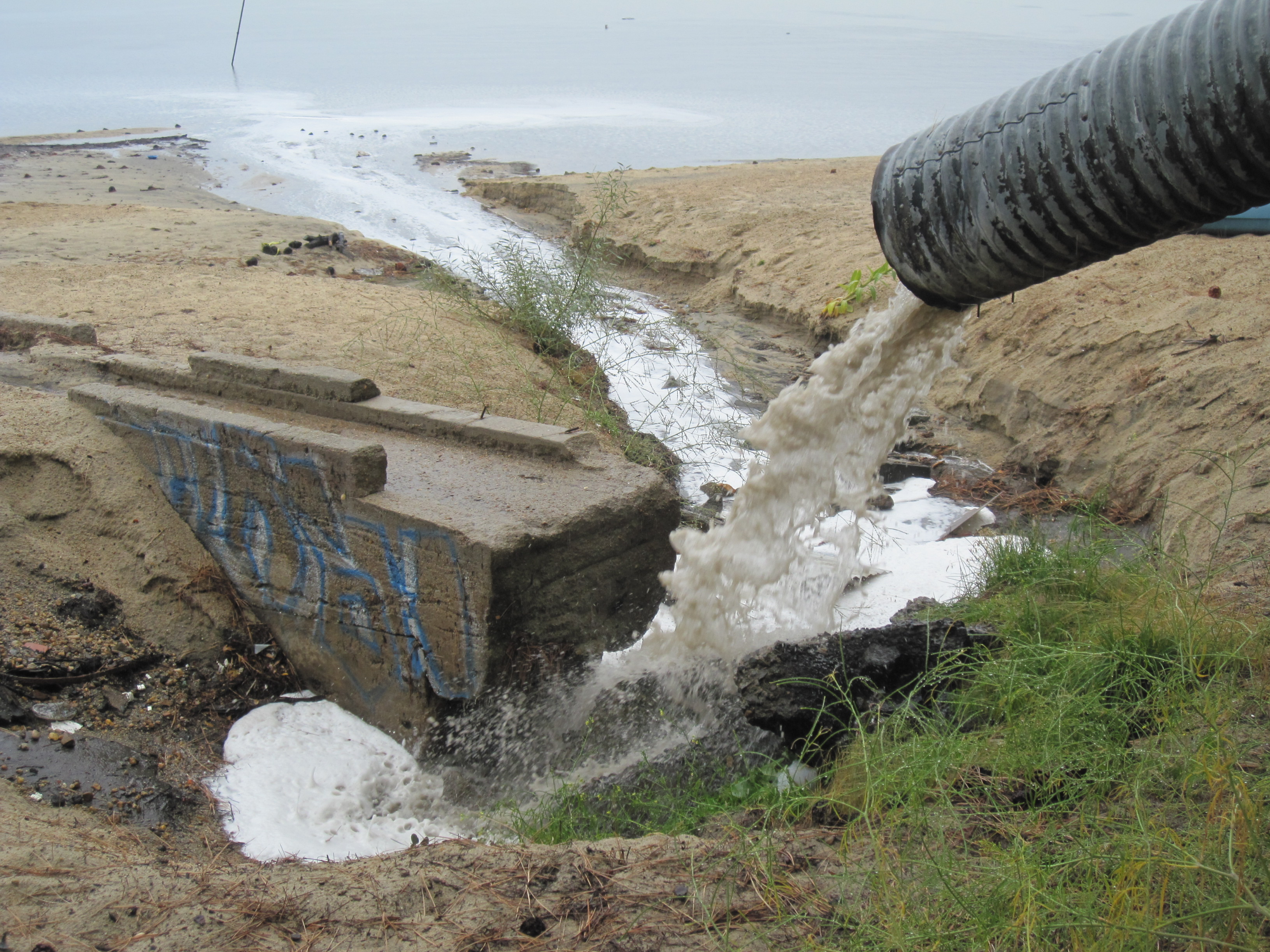
An example of road runoff with fine sediment, failing to reach its sluice, at El Dorado Beach. This storm drain was removed during construction of a new beach, called Lakeview Commons, opened in mid-2012.

Average Lake Tahoe Clarity – As Measured by Secchi Depth. View source data.

Despite land-use planning and export of treated sewage effluent from the basin, the lake is becoming increasingly eutrophic (having an excessive richness of nutrients), with primary productivity increasing by more than 5% annually, and clarity decreasing at an average rate of 0.82 feet (0.25 m) per year. Until the early 1980s, nutrient-limitation studies showed that primary productivity in the lake was nitrogen-limited. Now, after a half-century of accelerated nitrogen input (much of it from direct atmospheric deposition), the lake is phosphorus limited. Theodore Swift et al., concluded that "suspended inorganic sediments and phytoplanktonic algae both contribute significantly to the reduction in clarity, and that suspended particulate matter, rather than dissolved organic matter, are the dominant causes of clarity loss." The largest source of fine sediment particles to Lake Tahoe is urban stormwater runoff, constituting 72 percent of the total fine sediment particle load. Recent research has shown that the urban uplands also provide the largest opportunity to reduce fine sediment particle and phosphorus contributions to the lake. Historic clarity of approximately 98 feet (30 m) can be achieved with total reduction of approximately 75 percent from urban sources.

Historically, the clarity of Lake Tahoe continued to decrease through 2010, when the average Secchi depth, 64.4 feet (19.6 m), was the second lowest ever recorded (the lowest was 64.1 feet (19.5 m) in 1997). This represented a decrease of 3.7 feet (1.1 m) from the previous year. However, the lake's clarity increased from 2011 to 2014, improving by nearly 20 percent.

A water quality study by the Lahontan Water Quality Control Board and the Nevada Division of Environmental Protection determined the largest source of fine sediment particles: 71 percent is developed area (urban) erosion and run-off, much of it associated with transportation infrastructure and services.

Lake Tahoe is a tributary watershed drainage element within the Truckee River Basin, and its sole outlet is the Truckee River, which continues on to discharge to Pyramid Lake. Because of the sensitivity of Truckee River water quality (involving two protected species, the cui-ui sucker fish and the Lahontan cutthroat trout), this drainage basin has been studied extensively. The primary investigations were stimulated by the U.S. Environmental Protection Agency, which funded the development of the DSSAM model to analyze water quality below Lake Tahoe.

Lake Tahoe never freezes. Since 1970, it has mixed to a depth of at least 1,300 ft (400 m) a total of six or seven times. Dissolved oxygen is relatively high from top to bottom. Analysis of the temperature records in Lake Tahoe has shown that the lake warmed (between 1969 and 2002) at an average rate of 0.027 °F (0.015 °C) per year. The warming is caused primarily by increasing air temperatures, and secondarily by increasing downward long-wave radiation. The warming trend is reducing the frequency of deep mixing in the lake and may have important effects on water clarity and nutrient cycling.

=== Ecosystem changes ===
Since the 1960s, the Lake's food web and zooplankton populations have undergone major changes. In 1963–65, opossum shrimp (Mysis diluviana) were introduced to enhance the food supply for the introduced Kokanee salmon (Oncorhynchus nerka). The shrimp began feeding on the lake's cladocerans (Daphnia and Bosmina), and their populations virtually disappeared by 1971. The shrimp provide a food resource for salmon and trout, but also compete with juvenile fish for zooplankton. Since the 1970s, the cladoceran populations have somewhat recovered, but not to former levels. Since 2006, goldfish have been observed in the lake, where they have grown to "giant size". An invasive species, they may have descended from former pets which owners dumped, or when used as fishing bait.

The Lake Tahoe area is prone to wildfires, particularly the South Lake Tahoe region. The areas around are heavily forested, with four more times as much understory trees than in recent years. They are some of the most flammable types of trees. In June 2007, the Angora Fire burned approximately 3,100 acres (1,300 ha) throughout the South Lake Tahoe area. While the impact of ash on the lake's ecosystem is predicted to be minimal, the impact of potential future erosion is not yet known.

=== Environmental protection ===
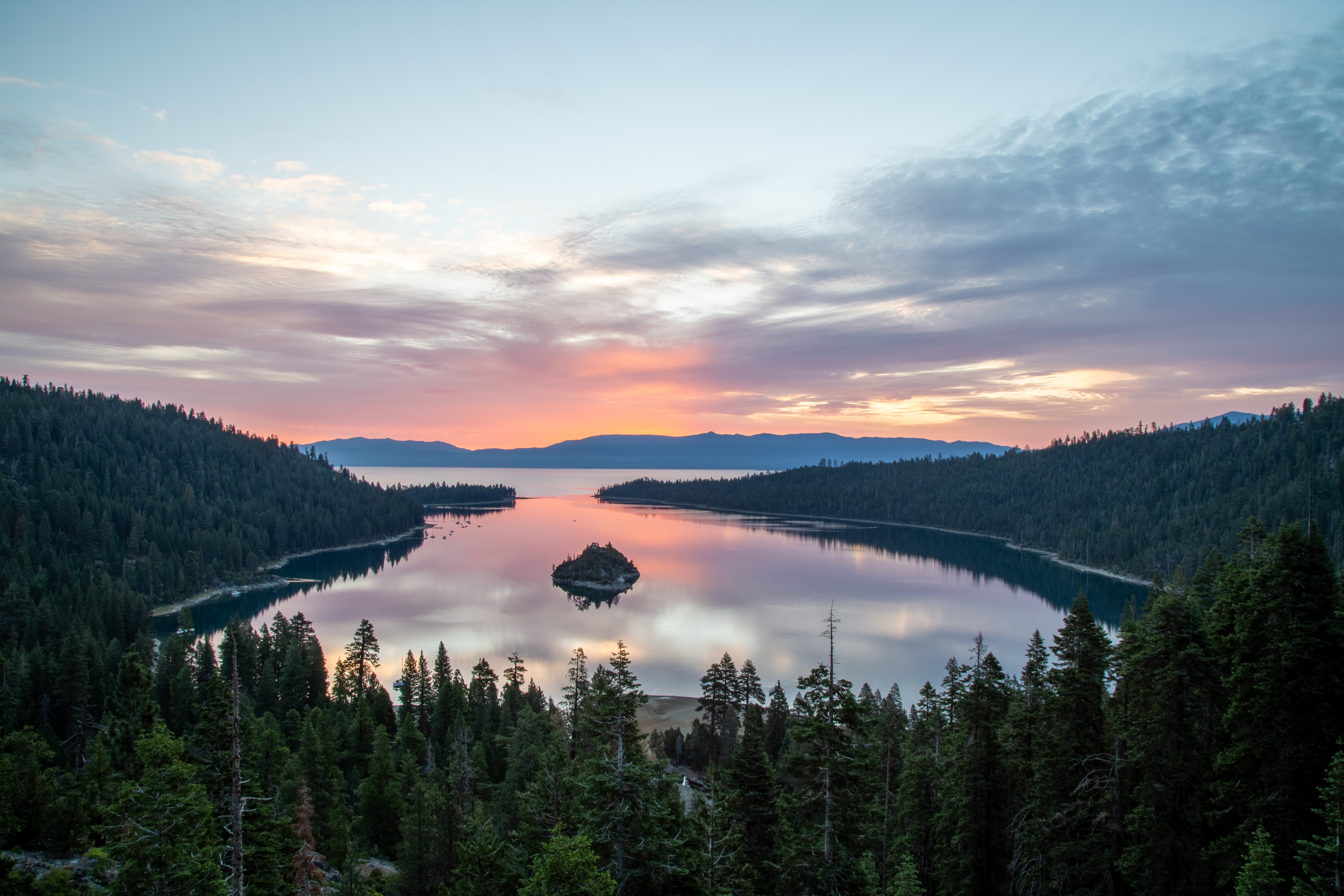
Emerald Bay, Lake Tahoe

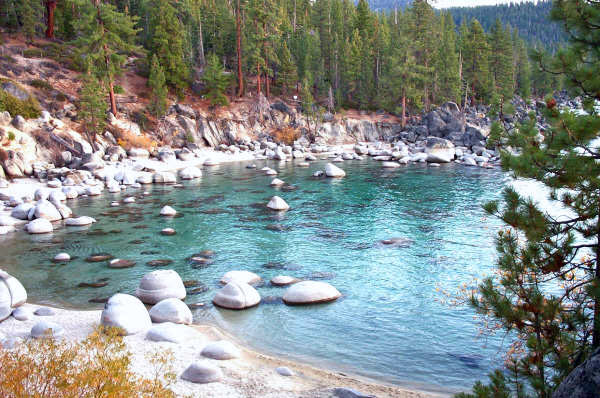
Secret Beach on Lake Tahoe's Nevada side

Construction activities have resulted in a clouding of the lake's blue waters. Currently, the Tahoe Regional Planning Agency is regulating construction along the shoreline (and has won two Federal Supreme Court battles over recent decisions). These regulations are unpopular with many residents, especially those in the Tahoe Lakefront Homeowners Association.

The League to Save Lake Tahoe (Keep Tahoe Blue) has been an environmental watchdog in the Lake Tahoe Basin for 50 years. Founded when a proposal to build a four-lane highway around the lake—with a bridge over the entrance to Emerald Bay—was proposed in 1957, the League has opposed many development projects in the area, which it alleges were environmentally harmful. The League embraces responsible and diversified use of the Lake's resources while protecting and restoring its natural attributes.

Since 1980, the Lake Tahoe Interagency Monitoring Program (LTIMP) has been measuring stream discharge and concentrations of nutrients and sediment in up to 10 tributary streams in the Lake Tahoe Basin, California-Nevada. The objectives of the LTIMP are to acquire and disseminate the water quality information necessary to support science-based environmental planning and decision making in the basin. The LTIMP is a cooperative program with support from 12 federal and state agencies with interests in the Tahoe Basin. This data set, together with more recently acquired data on urban runoff water quality, is being used by the Lahontan Regional Water Quality Control Board to develop a program (mandated by the Clean Water Act) to limit the flux of nutrients and fine sediment to the Lake.

Microplastics were found for the first time in 2019 by the Desert Research Institute. This pollution in the water could be local or from locations around the world as particles from discarded plastic products can be transported long distances through the atmosphere by wind, rain and falling snow. In 2023, updated measurements of microplastics in the lake revealed that Lake Tahoe contained some of the highest microplastic pollution concentrations found among 38 lakes and reservoirs measured. Restoring the Lake Depths Foundation uses a BlueROV2 to survey the bottom of Lake Tahoe in an organized grid pattern to remove microplastics and trash.

The UC Davis Tahoe Environmental Research Center is dedicated to research, education and public outreach, and to providing objective scientific information for restoration and sustainable use of the Lake Tahoe Basin. Each year, it produces a "State of the Lake" report, assessing changes such as lake clarity, nutrients and particles, or meteorology around the lake.

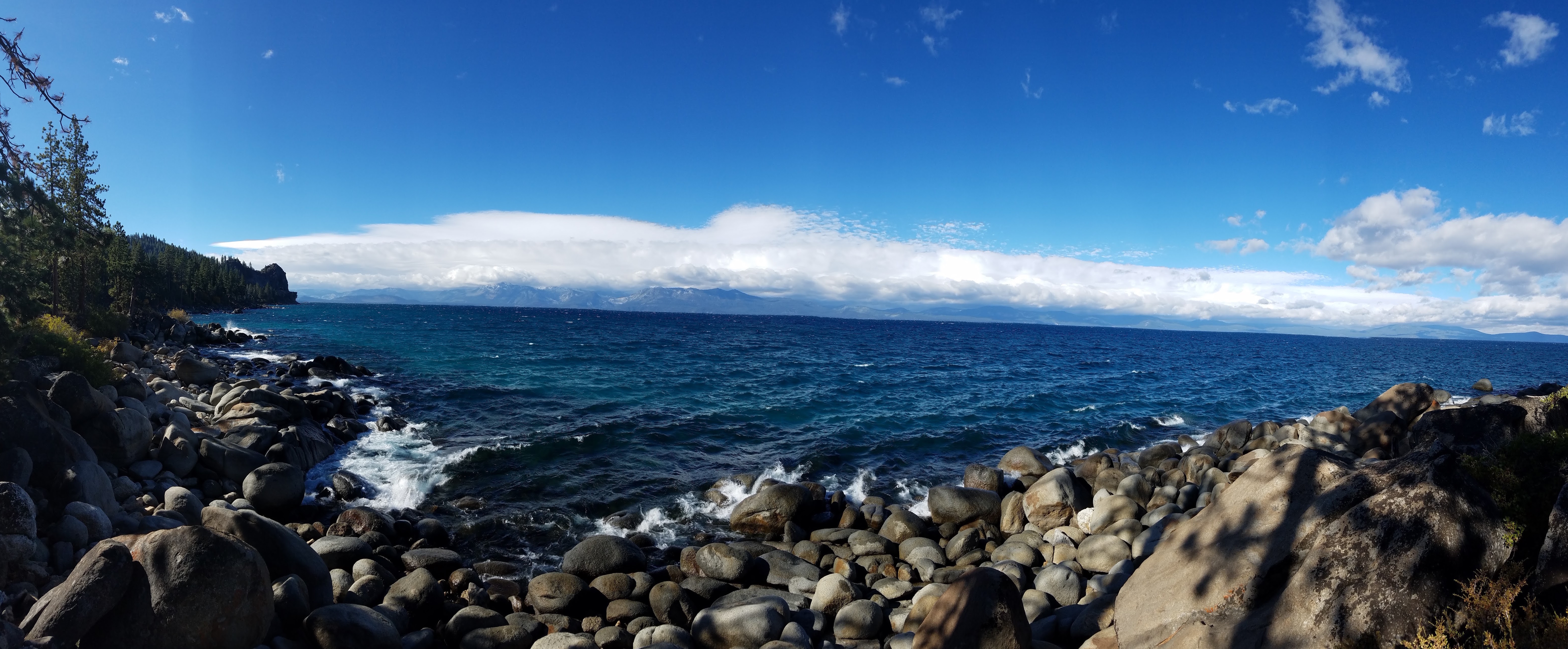
A view from the east shore of Lake Tahoe

== Tourism ==
Much of the area surrounding Lake Tahoe is devoted to the tourism industry and there are many restaurants, ski slopes, golf courses and casinos catering to visitors. The Nevada side of Tahoe provides additional tourist amenities due to Nevada's legal gambling, lower regulatory environment and tax burden than California. Nevada also had fewer restrictions than California during the COVID-19 pandemic which resulted in California hotels suffering economically while the Nevada casinos were described as "living large".

=== Winter sports ===
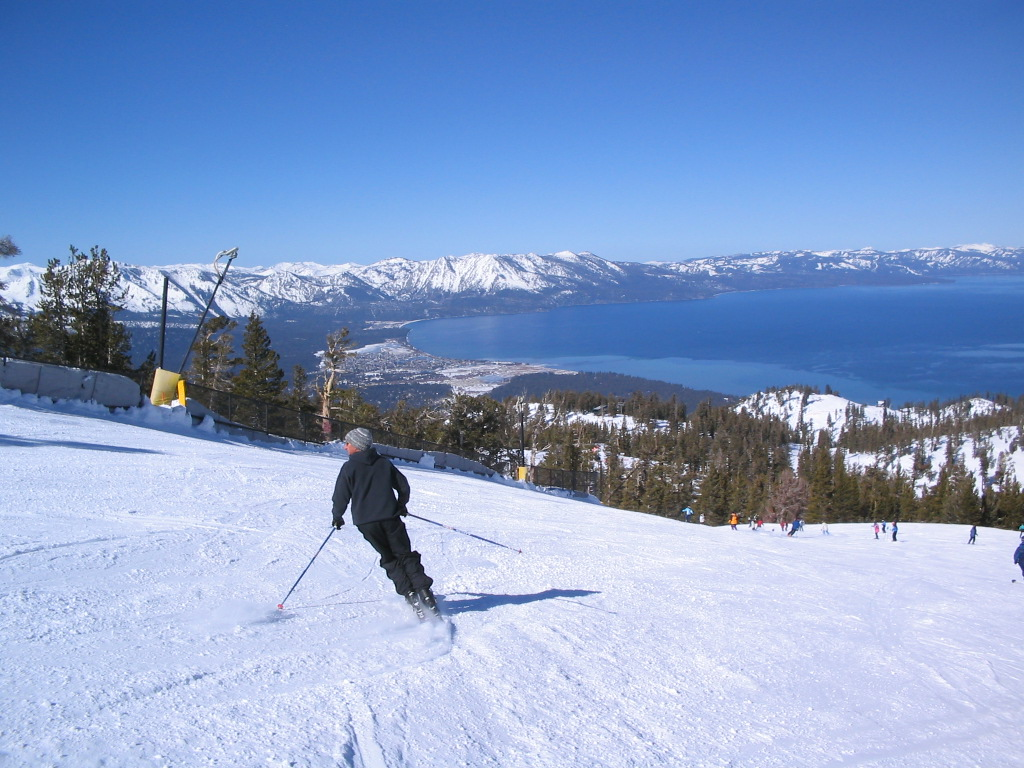
Ski slopes overlooking Lake Tahoe

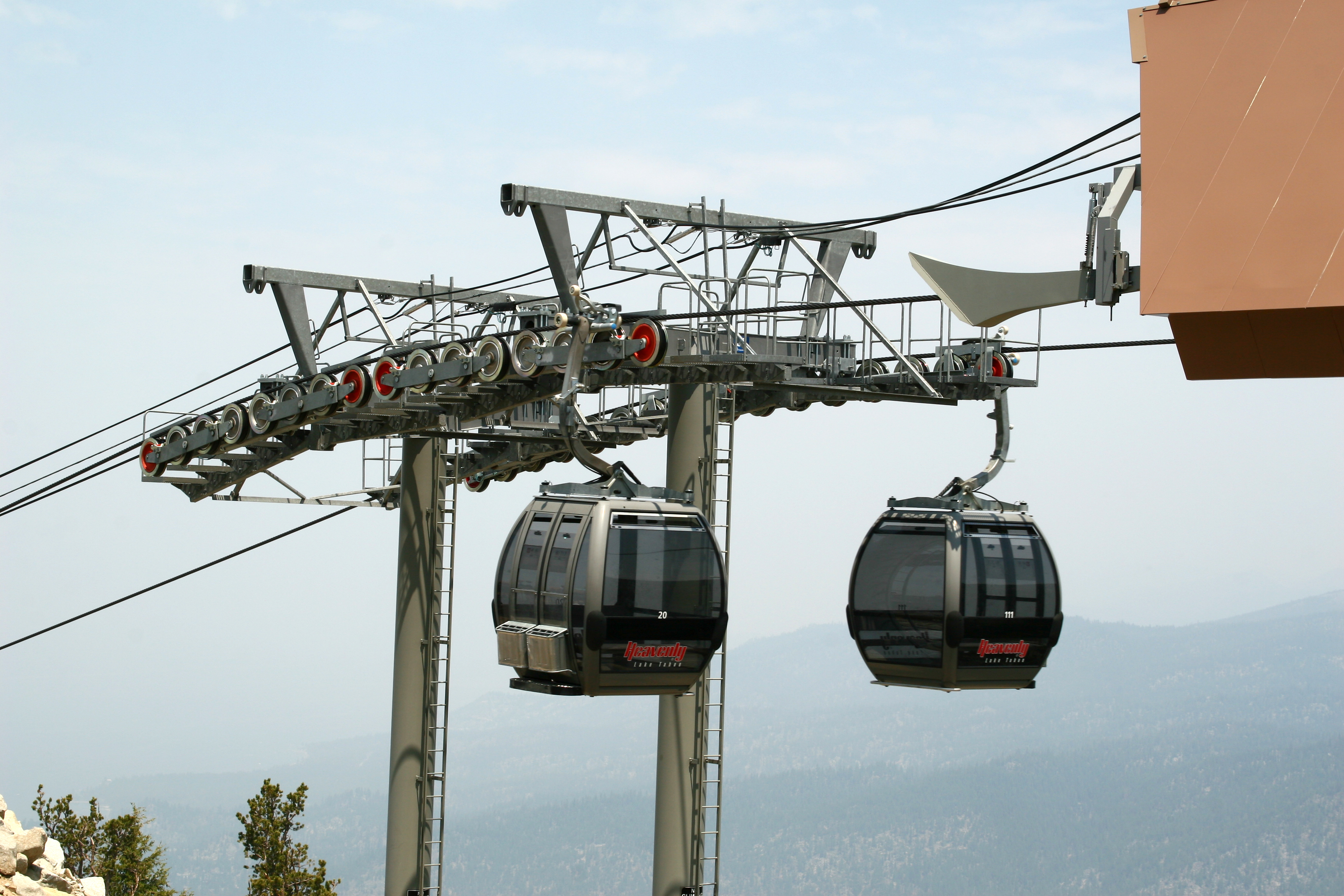
Lake Tahoe Gondola Ride

During ski season, thousands of people from all over Nevada and California, including Reno, Las Vegas, Los Angeles, San Diego, San Francisco, and Sacramento, flock to the slopes for downhill skiing. Lake Tahoe, in addition to its panoramic beauty, is well known for its blizzards.

Lake Tahoe is home to 15 ski areas. Some of the major ski areas are:

- Heavenly Mountain Resort: a popular ski resort located near Stateline on the South Shore
- Palisades Tahoe: a large ski resort created from the merge of Squaw Valley and Alpine Meadows, known for its hosting of the 1960 Winter Olympics, located near Tahoe City
- Diamond Peak: a small ski area located in Incline Village, Nevada
- Northstar California: a popular north shore ski area, known for its consistently rated top 10 North American terrain park
- Kirkwood Mountain Resort: a ski area which gets more snow than any other ski area in the Tahoe region
- Sierra-at-Tahoe: a medium-sized south shore ski area
- Boreal Mountain Resort: a small ski area on Donner Pass
- Sugar Bowl Ski Resort: a medium-sized ski area on Donner Pass
- Donner Ski Ranch: a very small ski area on Donner Pass
- Homewood Mountain Resort: a medium-sized ski area on the west shore
- Mount Rose Ski Resort: a medium-sized ski area north-east of the Lake, on Slide Mountain

The majority of the ski resorts in the Lake Tahoe region are on the northern end of the lake, near Truckee, California and Reno, Nevada. Kirkwood, Sierra-at-Tahoe and Heavenly are located on the southern side of the lake, 55–75 miles (90–120 km) from Reno. Scattered throughout Tahoe are public and private sled parks. Some, such as Granlibakken, are equipped with rope tows to help sledders get up the hill.

Many ski areas around Tahoe also have snow tubing, such as Olympic Valley. Throughout Tahoe, cross-country skiing, snowmobile riding and snowshoeing are also popular.

The NHL hosted two outdoor games at Lake Tahoe in 2021.

=== Water sports ===
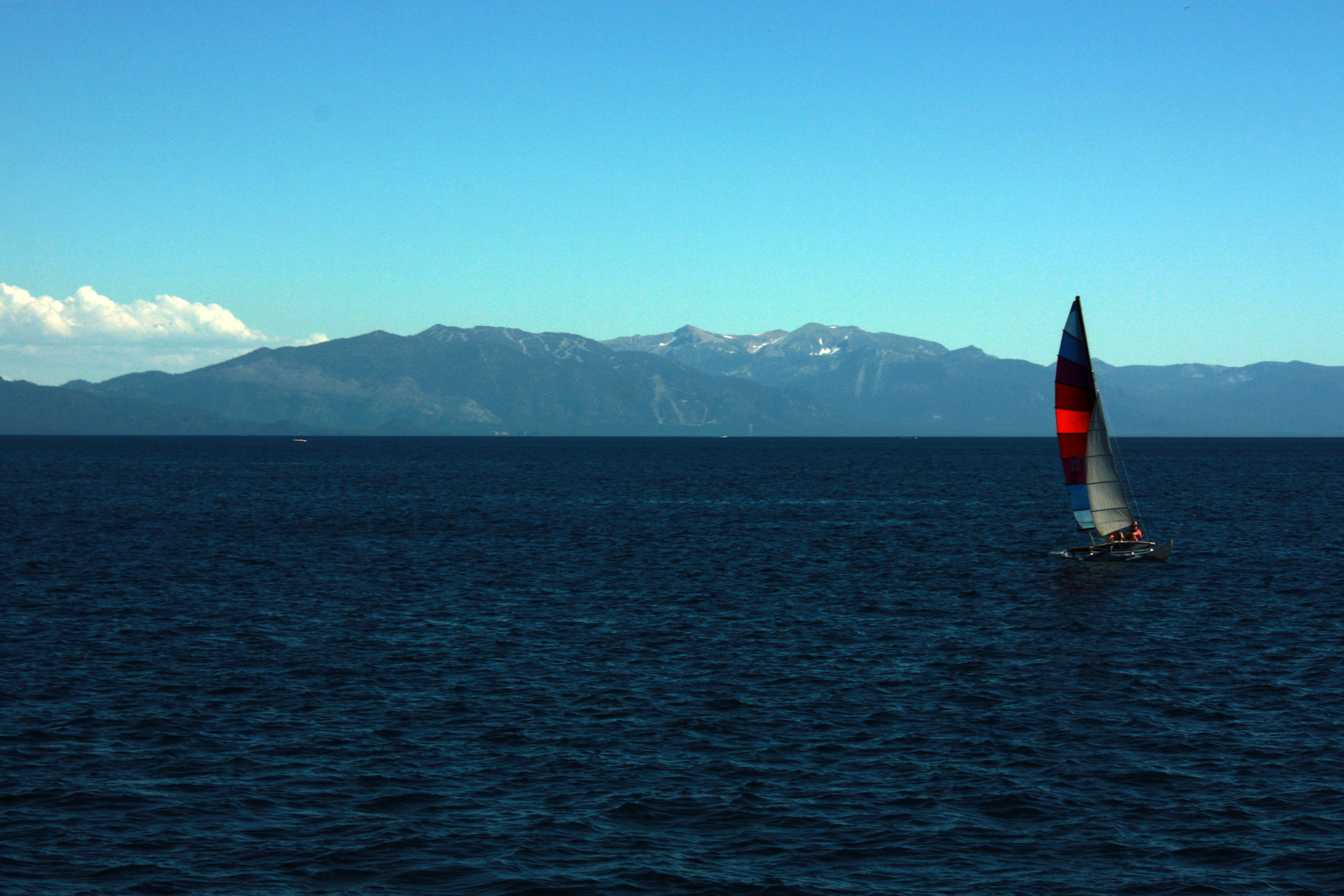
A sailboat on Lake Tahoe

During late Spring to early Fall, the lake is popular for water sports and beach activities. The two cities most identified with the Lake Tahoe tourist area are South Lake Tahoe, California and the smaller Stateline; smaller centers on the northern shoreline include Tahoe City and Kings Beach.

Other popular activities include parasailing, jet ski rentals, eco-friendly paddle sport rentals and fishing. There are rental locations around Lake Tahoe. Kayaking and stand-up paddle boards have also become very popular.

Boating is a primary activity in Tahoe in the summer. The lake is home to one of the most prestigious wooden boat shows in the country, the Lake Tahoe Concours d'Elegance, held every August. There are lake front restaurants all over the lake, most equipped with docks and buoys. There are all sorts of boating events, such as sailboat racing, firework shows over the lake, guided cruises, and more. As an interstate waterway, Lake Tahoe is subject to the United States Coast Guard. Lake Tahoe is home to Coast Guard Station Lake Tahoe.

SCUBA diving is popular at Lake Tahoe, with some dive sites offering dramatic drop-offs or wall dives. Diving at Lake Tahoe is considered advanced due to the increased risk of decompression sickness (DCS) while diving at such a high altitude.

Fred Rogers became the first person to swim the length of Lake Tahoe in 1955, and Erline Christopherson became the first woman to do so in 1962.

=== Motorcycling ===
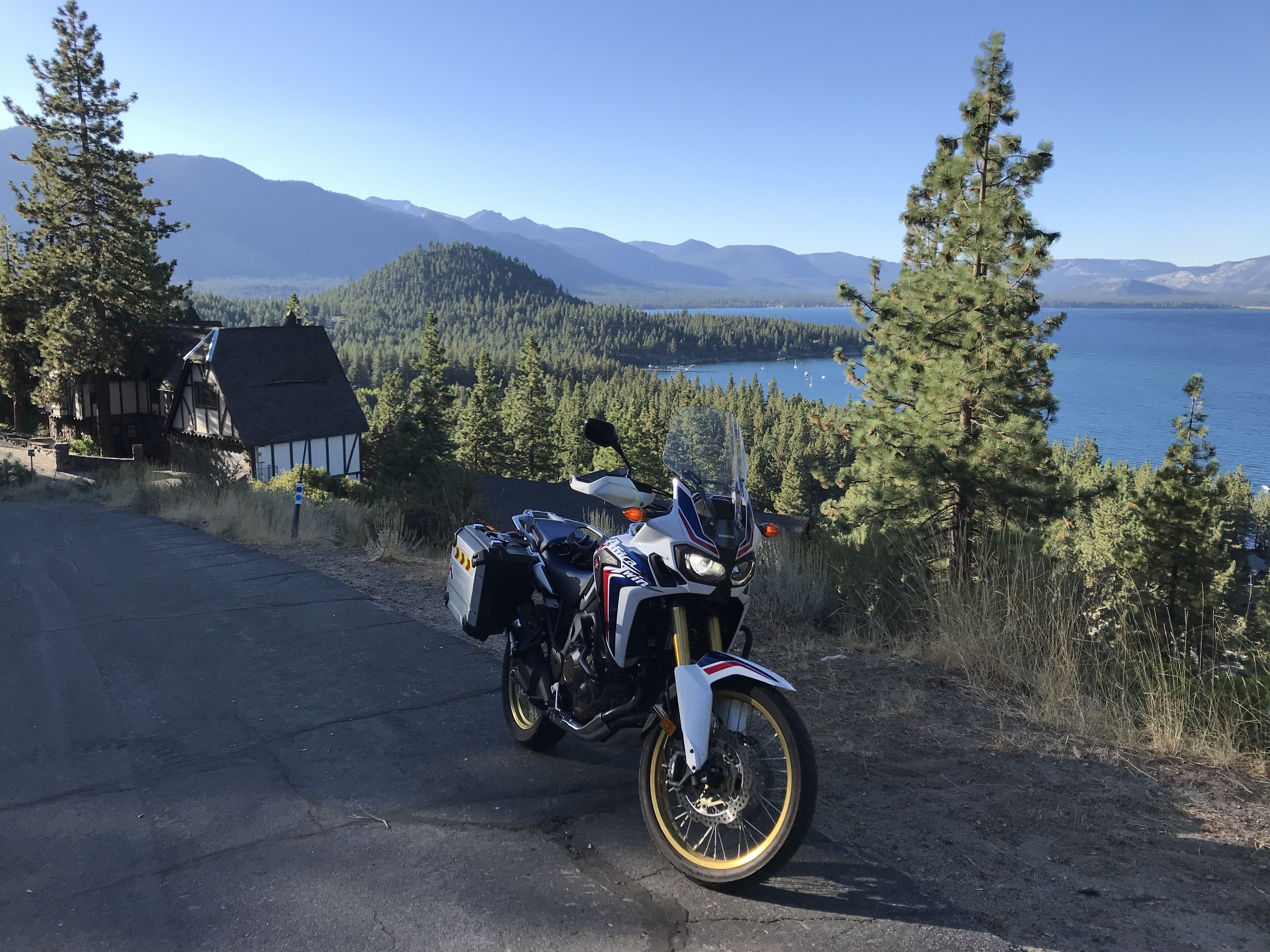
Motorcycle by Lake Tahoe

The lake and its scenic environs provide many opportunities for motorcyclists to ride both on and off-road. The most popular circuit that goes around the lake runs clockwise and starts in South Lake Tahoe on the California side. Riding north via route 89 allows riders to pull over to the right to admire the views without crossing traffic. Continuing onto highway 28 East, and finally, onto US-50 West will complete the full tour. Doing it in reverse allows experiencing the views from a different perspective. Kingsbury Grade (highway 207) is another popular route with local motorcyclists. It is only 11 miles long from South Lake Tahoe to Mottsville and can also be ridden in both directions. Some of the most scenic motorcycling stops and views around the lake:

- Emerald Bay – southwest Lake Tahoe, off Highway 89
- Fallen Leaf Lake – 6 miles southwest of South Lake, via Highway 89
- Zephyr Cove – 6 miles north of South Lake, off Highway 50
- Cave Rock – 9 miles north of South Lake, off Highway 50
- Sand Harbor – northwest Lake Tahoe, off Highway 28
- Kings Beach – North Lake Tahoe, off Highway 28
- Donner Lake – 21 miles north of Lake Tahoe, off I-80

=== Hiking and bicycling ===
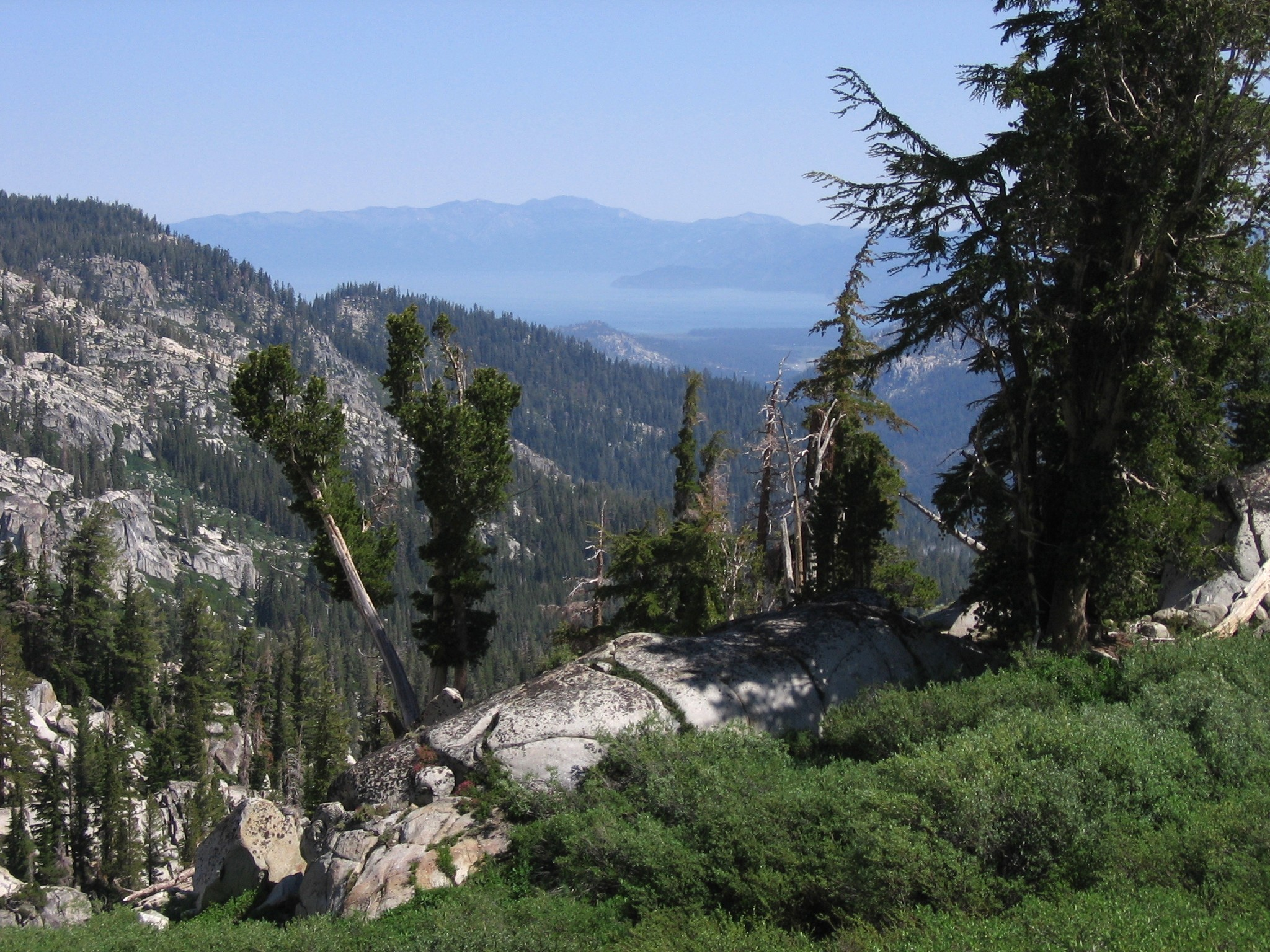
View from the Tahoe Rim Trail

There are numerous hiking and mountain biking trails around the lake. They range widely in length, difficulty and popularity. One of the most famous of Tahoe's trails is the Tahoe Rim Trail, a 165-mile (270-km) trail that circumnavigates the lake. Directly to the west of the lake is the Granite Chief Wilderness, which provides great hiking and wilderness camping. Also, to the southwest is the very popular Desolation Wilderness. One of the most popular trailheads used to access these popular destinations is Eagle Lake trailhead, located near Emerald Bay on Tahoe's west shore. The Flume Trail of the east shore is one of Mountain Biking Magazine's Top 10 Trails in the U.S. There are also many paved off-road bicycle paths that meander through communities on all sides of the lake.

=== Gambling ===
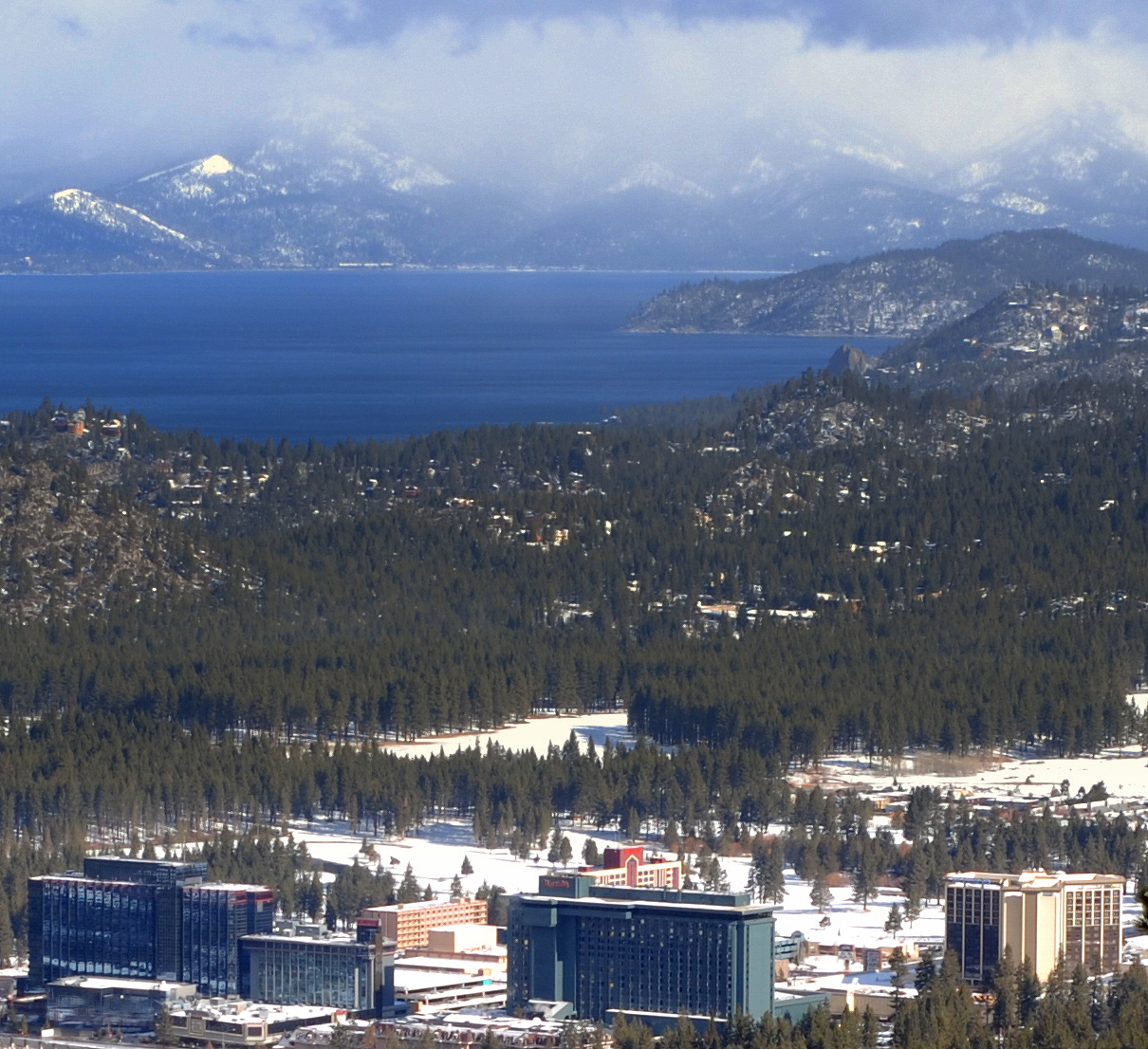
Casinos in Stateline, Nevada

Gambling is legal on the Nevada side of Lake Tahoe. Casinos, each with a variety of slot machines and table games are available. Four are located on the South Shore in Stateline, and four on the North Shore; three in Crystal Bay and one in Incline Village.

When Nevada legalized gambling in 1931, the first casino at the lake had already been open for years. First built on the North Shore in Crystal Bay by Robert Sherman in 1926, the Cal-Neva Lodge became the property of Norman Henry Biltz and was sold to Bill Graham and Jim McKay in 1929.

The Cal-Neva was rebuilt after a fire in 1937 and expanded several times, most noticeably in 1969 when the high-rise hotel was built. Along the way, Frank Sinatra owned the property in the early 1960s, shared his cabins with the likes of Sam Giancana and Marilyn Monroe, and sold out at the height of the area's popularity.

Other casinos at the North Shore include the Crystal Bay Club, first built in 1937 as the Ta-Neva-Ho; the defunct Tahoe Biltmore, and the Nugget. The Hyatt Regency is found at Incline Village.

At South Shore, Bill Harrah purchased the Stateline Country Club, which had stood since 1931 and built Harrah's Tahoe. Other casinos include Hard Rock Hotel and Casino Lake Tahoe, Harveys Lake Tahoe, and Bally's Lake Tahoe.

== Transportation ==
Lake Tahoe can be reached by car and bus. The nearest passenger train service is the Amtrak station in Truckee, and is served by Amtrak's train, the California Zephyr, which runs daily between Chicago and the San Francisco Bay Area. An Amtrak Thruway bus also connects South Lake Tahoe to the Capitol Corridor in Sacramento. The closest scheduled passenger airline service is available via the Reno-Tahoe International Airport (RNO).

The Tahoe Transportation District provides fare-free local mass transit in and around South Lake Tahoe and connects the basin to the Carson Valley and Carson City, and Tahoe Truckee Area Regional Transit (TART) serves the north and northwest shores of the lake, also connecting to Truckee and Amtrak.

=== Highways ===
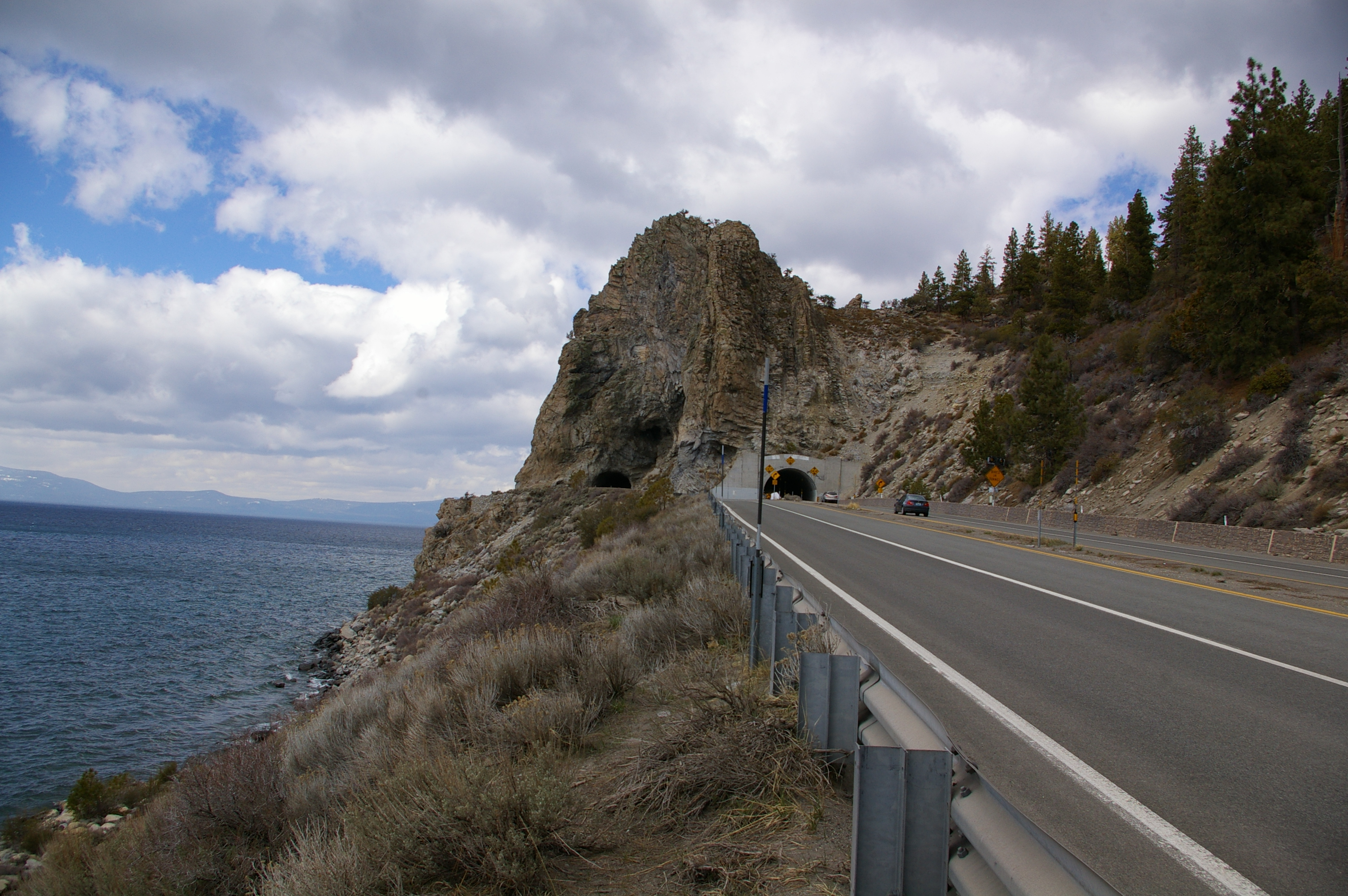
Cave Rock Tunnel on US 50

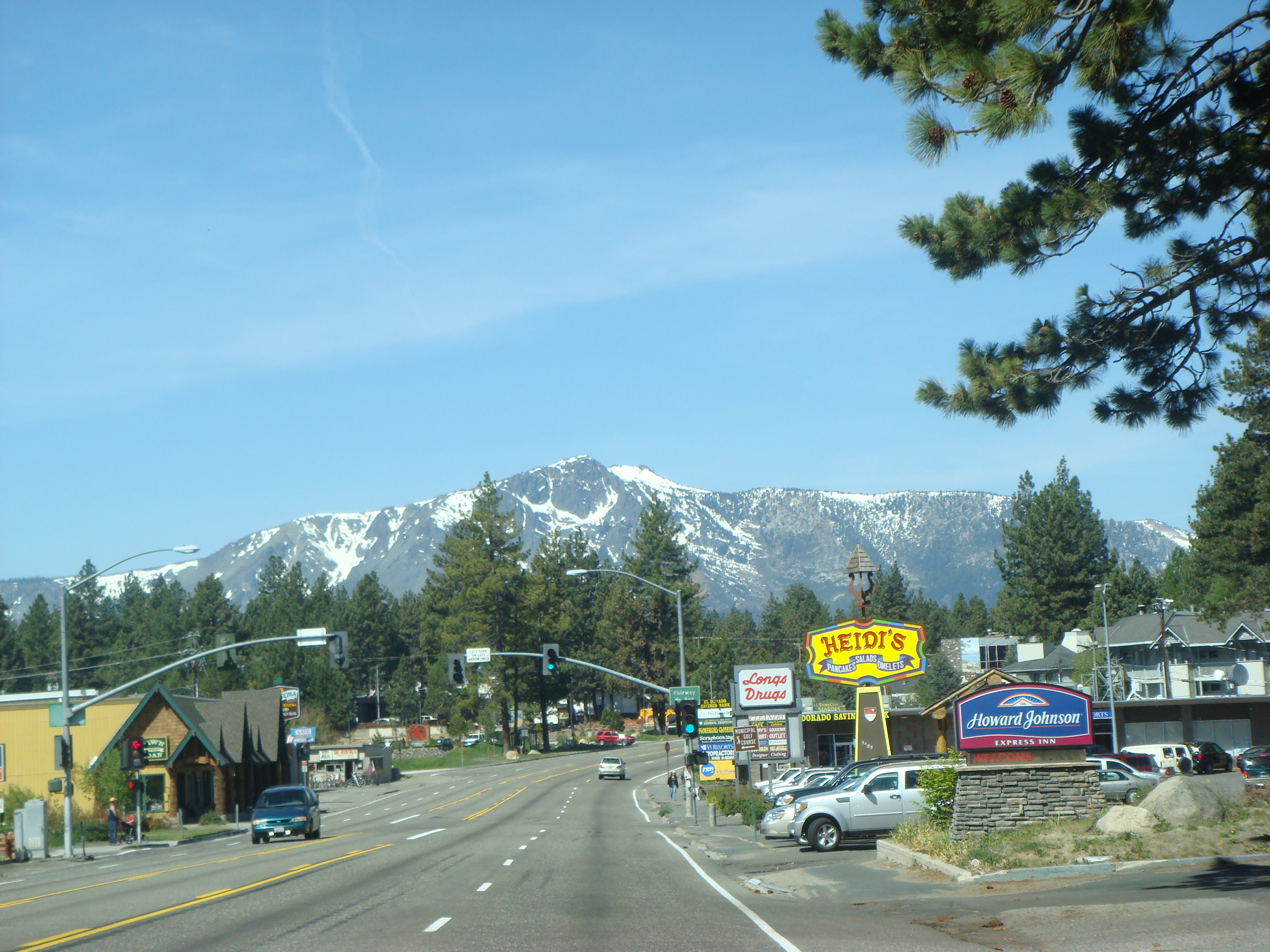
U.S. Route 50 in South Lake Tahoe

Visitors can reach Lake Tahoe under ideal conditions within two hours from the Sacramento area, one hour from Reno or thirty minutes from Carson City. In winter months, chains or snow tires are often necessary to reach Tahoe from any direction. Traffic can be heavy on weekends due to tourists if not also from weather.

The primary routes to Lake Tahoe are on Interstate 80 via Truckee, U.S. Route 50, and Nevada State Route 431 via Reno. Most of the highways accessing and encircling Lake Tahoe are paved two-lane mountain roads. US 50 is a four-lane highway (from the canyon of the South Fork American River at Riverton, over the Sierra Nevada at Echo Summit, and into the Lake Tahoe Basin, is a mainly two-lane road) passing south of the lake and along part of the eastern shore.

California State Route 89 follows the western shore of the lake through the picturesque wilderness and connects camping, fishing and hiking locations such as those at Emerald Bay State Park, DL Bliss State Park and Camp Richardson. Farther along are communities such as Meeks Bay and Tahoe City. Finally, the highway turns away from the lake and heads northwest toward Truckee.

California State Route 28 completes the circuit from Tahoe City around the northern shore to communities such as Kings Beach, Crystal Bay, and into Incline Village, Nevada where the road becomes Nevada State Route 28. Route 28 returns along the eastern shore to US 50 near Spooner Lake.

=== Major area airports ===
| Name | City | ICAO code | IATA code |
|---|---|---|---|
| Reno-Tahoe International Airport | Reno, Nevada | KRNO | RNO |
| Sacramento International Airport | Sacramento, California | KSMF | SMF |
| Truckee Tahoe Airport | Truckee, California | KTRK | TRF |
| Minden–Tahoe Airport | Minden, Nevada | KMEV | MEV |

== Communities ==
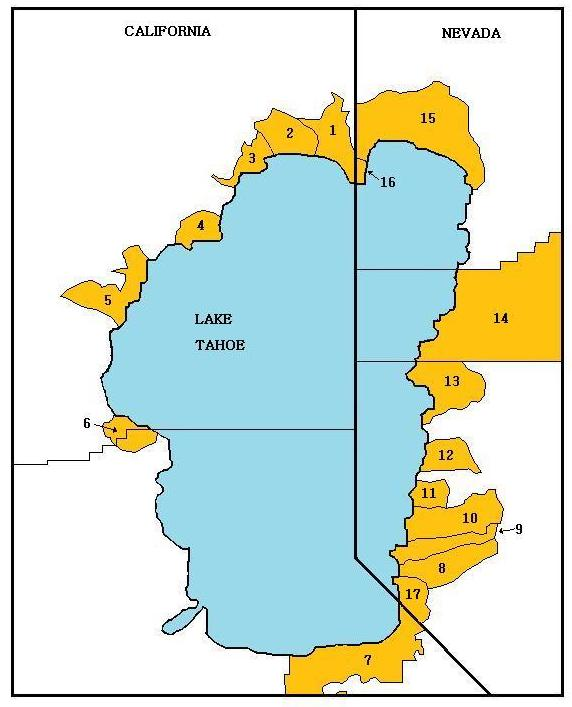

=== California ===
Placer County

- Carnelian Bay #3
- Dollar Point #4
- Kings Beach #1
- Sunnyside-Tahoe City #5
- Tahoe Vista #2
- Tahoma (partially in El Dorado County) #6

El Dorado County

- South Lake Tahoe #7
- Fallen Leaf Lake
- Tahoma (partially in Placer County) #6
- Tahoe Keys

=== Nevada ===
- Carson City #14

Douglas County

- Glenbrook #13
- Lakeridge #11
- Logan Creek #12
- Round Hill Village #8
- Skyland #10
- Stateline #17
- Zephyr Cove #9

Washoe County

- Crystal Bay #16
- Incline Village #15

== Folklore ==
Lake Tahoe is home to various legends that have been passed down through local Native American traditions and other sources. These include stories about Water Babies, the Ong, Tahoe Tessie, and the Ghosts of Fannette Island.

=== Water Babies ===
In Washoe tradition, Water Babies are powerful spirits believed to inhabit bodies of water including those of Lake Tahoe. They were thought to have the ability to cause harm or even death. Washoe healers would visit sacred places, such as Cave Rock, to consult with the Water Babies, bringing offerings in the hope of gaining their favor and strength.

=== Ong ===
The Ong is a figure from Washoe legend, described as a large bird that lived in Lake Tahoe. It was said to prey on animals and humans. One legend recounts that a young man named Tahoe was captured by the Ong but managed to escape by feeding it poisoned arrowheads. The bird was believed to have died and sunk into the lake.

=== Tahoe Tessie ===
Tahoe Tessie is a reported creature said to live in Lake Tahoe. Descriptions of Tessie resemble those of other lake monsters, such as the Loch Ness Monster, with many believing it to be a large aquatic animal, potentially a sturgeon.

=== Ghosts of Fannette Island ===
Fannette Island in Emerald Bay is purportedly haunted by the ghost of Captain Richard Barter, a man who lived on the island in the late 1800s. He died while returning to the island in 1873, and some local stories claim that his ghost can be seen wandering the island.

== In the media ==
The Ponderosa Ranch of the TV series Bonanza was formerly located on the Nevada side of Lake Tahoe. The opening sequence of the TV series was filmed at the McFaul Creek Meadow, with Mount Tallac in the background. In September 2004 the Ponderosa Ranch closed its doors, after being sold to developer David Duffield for an undisclosed price.

The 1974 film The Godfather Part II used the lakeside estate Fleur de Lac as the location of several scenes, including the elaborate First Communion celebration, the Senator's shakedown attempt of Michael, the assassination attempt on Michael, Michael disowning Fredo, Carmela Corleone's funeral, Fredo's execution while fishing, and the closing scene of Michael sitting alone outside. Fleur de Lac, on the western California shore of Lake Tahoe, was formerly the Henry Kaiser estate. The surrounding lakeside area has been developed into a private gated condominium community and some of the buildings of the "Corleone compound" still exist, including the boathouse.

The 2014 film Last Weekend, starring Patricia Clarkson and directed by Tom Dolby and Tom Williams, used the west shore lakefront home of Ray and Dagmar Dolby as the primary location for its interiors and exteriors. The house, built in 1929, was also the site for the exteriors for A Place in the Sun, starring Elizabeth Taylor and Montgomery Clift. The 1988 film Things Change was also filmed here.

British rock band A's song "Here We Go Again (I Love Lake Tahoe)" and the accompanying music video centers around the band's love for the lake and the surrounding holiday locations.

The lake is mentioned in the lyrics to the song "Unfair" by cult indie rock band Pavement.

The lake is the setting for Kate Bush's song of the same name from the album 50 Words for Snow. In the song, a woman who drowned in the lake is reunited with her beloved dog in the afterlife. The song was accompanied by a video written and directed by Bush.

Tahoe, a 2018 ambient album by Dedekind Cut.

== In popular culture ==
Apple's macOS Tahoe was named after Lake Tahoe.

== See also ==
- Clear Lake
- Fannette Island
- List of dams and reservoirs in California
- List of Lake Tahoe inflow streams
- List of lakes by volume
- List of lakes in California
- List of largest reservoirs of California
- Mono Lake
- Rubicon Trail
- Washoe Lake
