= Butler Ives =

- Born: January 31, 1830; Berkshire County, Massachusetts, U.S.
- Died: 1872 near Vallejo, California, U.S.
- Resting place: Elmwood Cemetery, Detroit, Michigan
- Education: University of Michigan
- Occupations: Civil engineer, surveyor
- Known for: Surveying and locating the route of the First transcontinental railroad, Houghton–Ives survey
- Parents: Butler Ives Sr.; Olive Hall Morse Sheffield
- Relatives: Younger of ten children

Butler Ives (January 31, 1830, in Berkshire County, Massachusetts – December 1872 near Vallejo, California) was an American civil engineer and surveyor best known for his work on the western segment of the First transcontinental railroad in the United States. He played a key role in surveying and locating the route of the Union Pacific Railroad and Central Pacific Railroad between San Francisco and Salt Lake City, working under Leland Stanford and chief engineer Samuel S. Montague. In 1863, Ives co-led the Houghton–Ives survey to establish the boundary between California and the Nevada Territory, a project that produced a partial demarcation still referenced in border disputes.

== Early life and education ==
He was the son of Butler Ives Sr. and Olive Hall Morse Sheffield, was the youngest of ten children and was educated at the University of Michigan. He is buried in Elmwood Cemetery, Detroit, Michigan.

== Career ==
His greatest work consisted of pioneer engineering, surveying and locating the line of the Union Pacific and Central Pacific railroads between San Francisco and Salt Lake City, working under Leland Stanford and Samuel S. Montague, chief engineer. He was contracted to locate and survey the boundary line between the Nevada Territory and the State of California—running south and southeast from Oregon.

In 1863, Ives worked with J. F. Houghton to survey the California-Nevada border. The survey was never completed, but the partial delineation was known as the Houghton-Ives line.

His professional papers and family archives are housed at the Clarence Burton Historical Society in Detroit. They date back to 1754 and include the old family bible.
