= Gomphoneis elegans =

Scientific classification
- Domain: Eukaryota
- Clade: Diaphoretickes
- Clade: SAR
- Clade: Stramenopiles
- Phylum: Gyrista
- Subphylum: Ochrophytina
- Class: Bacillariophyceae
- Order: Cymbellales
- Family: Gomphonemataceae
- Genus: Gomphoneis
- Species: G. elegans

Binomial name
- Gomphoneis elegans (Grunow) Cleve, 1894

Varieties
- Gomphoneis elegans var. baicalensis Skvortzow & Meyer, 1928; Gomphoneis elegans var. elegans (Grunow in Van Heurck) Cleve, 1894; Gomphoneis elegans var. quadripunctata Skvortzow & Meyer, 1928

Synonyms
- Gomphonema elegans Grunow, 1880

Species of single-celled organism

Gomphoneis elegans is a species of diatoms in the family Gomphonemataceae.
