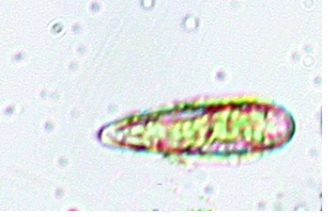

Scientific classification
- Domain: Eukaryota
- Clade: Diaphoretickes
- Clade: SAR
- Clade: Stramenopiles
- Phylum: Gyrista
- Subphylum: Ochrophytina
- Class: Bacillariophyceae
- Order: Cymbellales
- Family: Gomphonemataceae
- Genus: Gomphoneis; P.T. Cleve, 1894

Species
- Several, including: Gomphoneis baicaliana J.P.Kociolek & M.S.Kulikovskiy, 2013; Gomphoneis basiorobusta You & Kociolek, 2013; Gomphoneis calcifuga (Lange-Bertalot & E.Reichardt) A.Tuji, 2005; Gomphoneis capitata J.P.Kociolek & M.S.Kulikovskiy, 2013; Gomphoneis clevei (Fricke) Gil, 1989; Gomphoneis distorta You & Kociolek, 2013; Gomphoneis elegans (Grunow) Cleve, 1894

= Gomphoneis =

Genus of single-celled organisms

Gomphoneis is a genus of diatoms in the family Gomphonemataceae.

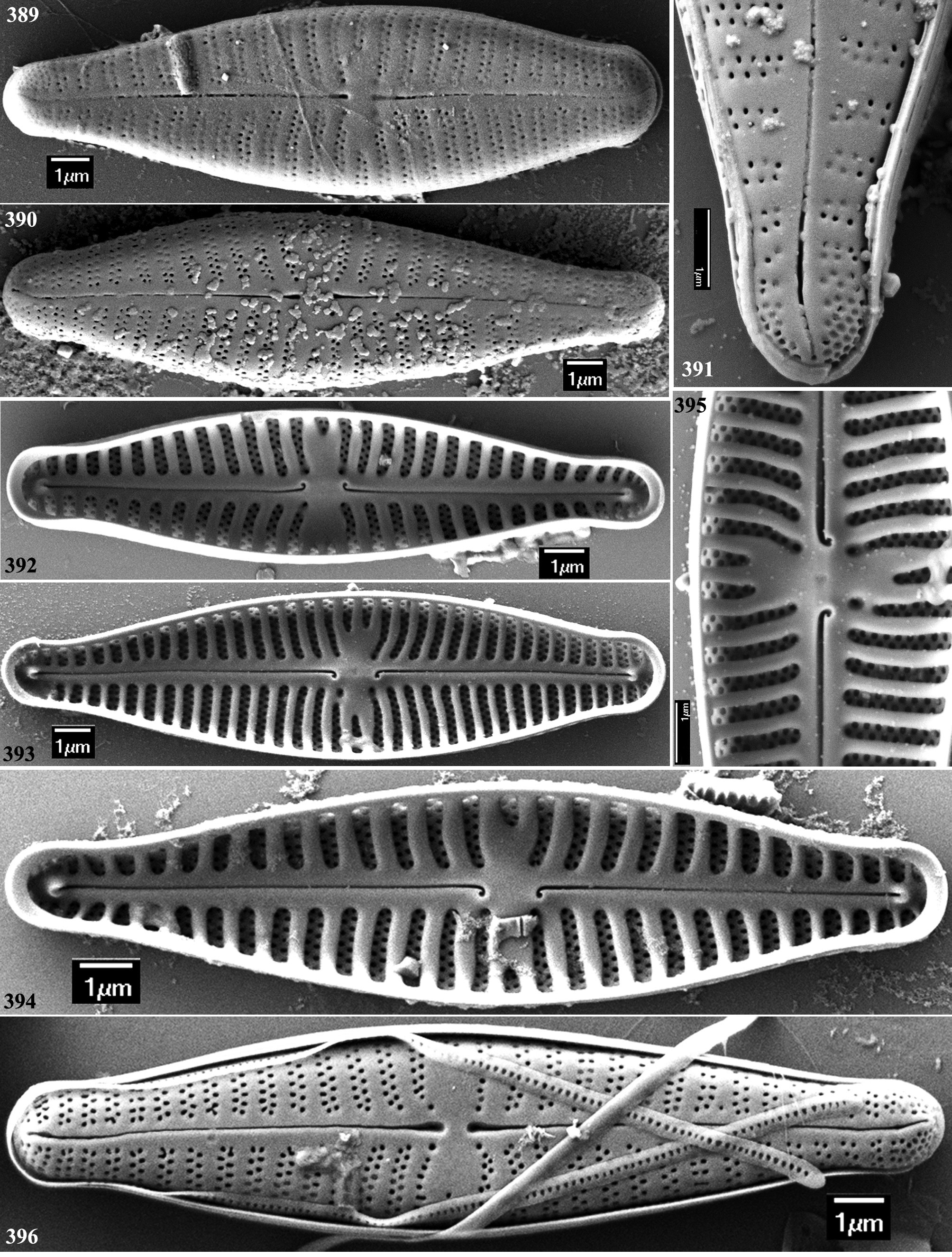
Image extracted from KOCIOLEK, J. P., KULIKOVSKIY, M. S., & SOLAK, C. N. (2013)
