= Samuel S. Montague =

American railway engineer (1830–1883)

Samuel Skerry Montague (1830–1883) was a railway engineer responsible for building railways in the United States. He was appointed chief engineer of the Central Pacific Railroad in 1863. He also worked on the Southern Pacific Railroad and the first transcontinental railroad.

== Early life ==
He was the son of Richard and Content Montague, was born at Keene, New Hampshire, July 6, 1830. At the age of six his family moved to Rockford, Illinois, where he attended school in the winters and the Rockford Classical School. At the age of 22 he started working on the Rock Island and Rockford Railroad in 1852 starting out as a surveyor's assistant. Later he worked on the Peoria and Bureau Valley Railroad, then with the Rock Island and Peoria, and finally with the Burlington and Missouri River Railroad. All these railroads were bought out by other railroads and only existed for a short period of time.

== Career ==
In the fall of 1859 he went to California over the California Trail. In California Montague met Theodore Judah and worked for him building the Valley Railroad from Folsom, California, to Marysville, California. Combined with his previous experience Montague continued to learn his engineering skills by apprenticing with Judah. On February 12, 1862, Montague went to work for Judah now the Chief Engineer on the Central Pacific, helping with the location surveys over the Sierra Nevada (U.S.). Montague worked his way up to Judah's assistant engineer by the time of Judah's death in 1863.

Montague was appointed Chief Engineer of the Central Pacific Railroad in 1863 after the death of Theodore Judah. He was responsible for building the western half of the First transcontinental railroad. He was a confidant of Leland Stanford the founder of Stanford University, governor of California and one of the "big four" who directed the Central Pacific Railroad. Samuel was one of Stanford's "inner circle". He was the engineer charged with directing the locating, designing and building the western section of the transcontinental railroad that linked the west and east coasts of the United States, that linked Promontory Summit, Utah, to Sacramento, California. Montague was assisted by his fellow engineers Lewis M. Clement and James Harvey Strobridge. Montague directed the engineering work on the Central Pacific which involved the work of thousands of Chinese as well as their "white" surveyors, engineers, coordinators, supervisors, etc. as they crossed the Sierra Nevada over Donner Pass. It was a monumental engineering undertaking. In the famous "Golden Spike" celebration photo of 1869 in which a Central Pacific locomotive and a Union Pacific locomotive are touching "nose-to-nose" at Promontory, Utah, the two men shaking hands at the center of this photograph are Samuel S. Montague, Chief Engineer for the Central Pacific and Grenville M. Dodge, Chief Engineer for the Union Pacific. Samuel in about 1869 became one of eight officers of the Central Pacific Railroad. In addition to the transcontinental railroad, he was chief engineer during the construction of numerous other railroad lines in California that Central Pacific and later the expanded Southern Pacific Railroad continued to build.

== Personal life ==
Montague married Louisa Adams Redington in San Francisco, California, on February 13, 1868. She was a sister of Charles H. Redington, an official of the Southern Pacific Company which later absorbed the Central Pacific. Montague and Louisa had four children and lived in Oakland, California. Montague died on September 24, 1883, and was buried in Oakland.
