= Round Hill Village, Nevada =

- Census-designated place
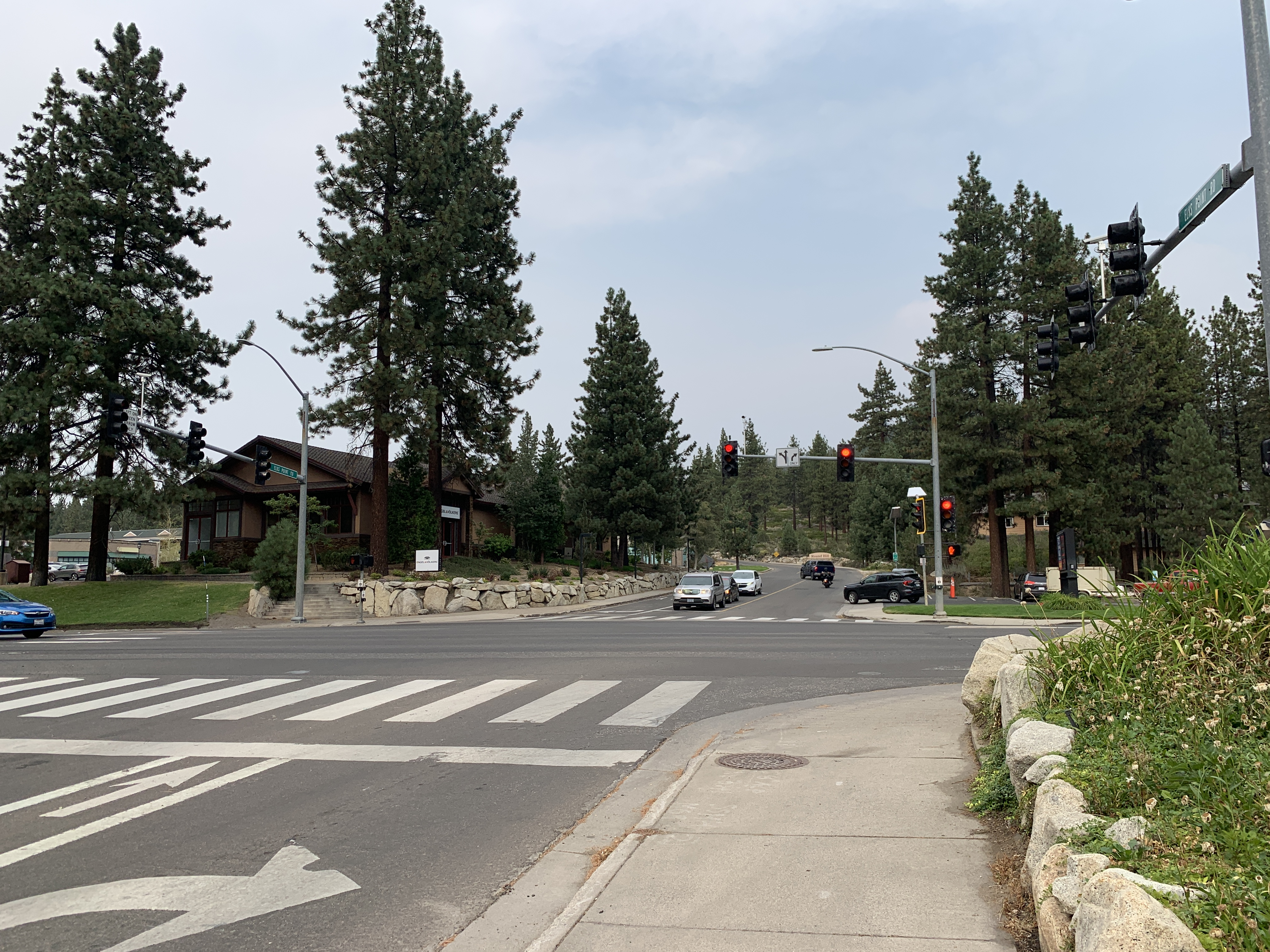

- Location of Round Hill Village, Nevada
- Coordinates: 38°59′2″N 119°56′33″W
- Country: United States
- State: Nevada

Area
  - Total: 5.92 sq mi (15.34 km^{2})
  - Land: 5.80 sq mi (15.01 km^{2})
  - Water: 0.13 sq mi (0.34 km^{2})
- Elevation: 7,248 ft (2,209 m)

Population (2020)
  - Total: 898
  - Density: 155.0/sq mi (59.85/km^{2})
- Time zone: UTC-8 (Pacific (PST))
  - Summer (DST): UTC-7 (PDT)
- ZIP code: 89448
- Area code: 775
- FIPS code: 32-62170
- GNIS feature ID: 2583954

Round Hill Village is a census-designated place (CDP) in northwestern Douglas County, Nevada, United States. As of the 2020 census, Round Hill Village had a population of 898. Prior to 2010, the community was part of the Zephyr Cove–Round Hill Village CDP.

== Geography ==
Round Hill Village is located on the east shore of Lake Tahoe in far western Nevada. U.S. Route 50 is the main road through the CDP, leading south 2 miles (3 km) to the California state line and northeast 23 miles (37 km) to Carson City. Zephyr Cove is immediately to the north, and Stateline is to the south. Kingsbury occupies the ridge to the east.

According to the United States Census Bureau, the Round Hill Village CDP has a total area of 5.9 square miles (15.3 km^{2}), of which 5.8 square miles (15.0 km^{2}) is land and 0.12 square miles (0.3 km^{2}), or 2.19%, is water.

== Demographics ==
Historical population
Census	Pop.	Note	%±
2010	759		—
2020	898		18.3%
U.S. Decennial Census

== See also ==
- List of census-designated places in Nevada
