= Nevada State Route 206 =

Highway in Nevada

State Route 206
- Foothill Road, Genoa Lane
- Nevada State Route 206, highlighted in red

Route information
- Maintained by NDOT
- Length: 15.435 mi (24.840 km)
- Existed: 1976–present

Major junctions
- South end: SR 88 south of Centerville
- North end: US 395 north of Minden

Location
- Country: United States
- State: Nevada
- County: Douglas

Highway system
- Nevada State Highway System; Interstate; US; State; Pre‑1976; Scenic
← SR 173	→ SR 207
← SR 757	758	→ SR 759

State Route 206 (SR 206) is a state highway in Douglas County, Nevada, United States. It runs northwest from State Route 88 near the California state line along Foothill Road to Genoa, and then turns east on Genoa Lane to end at U.S. Route 395.

== Route description ==
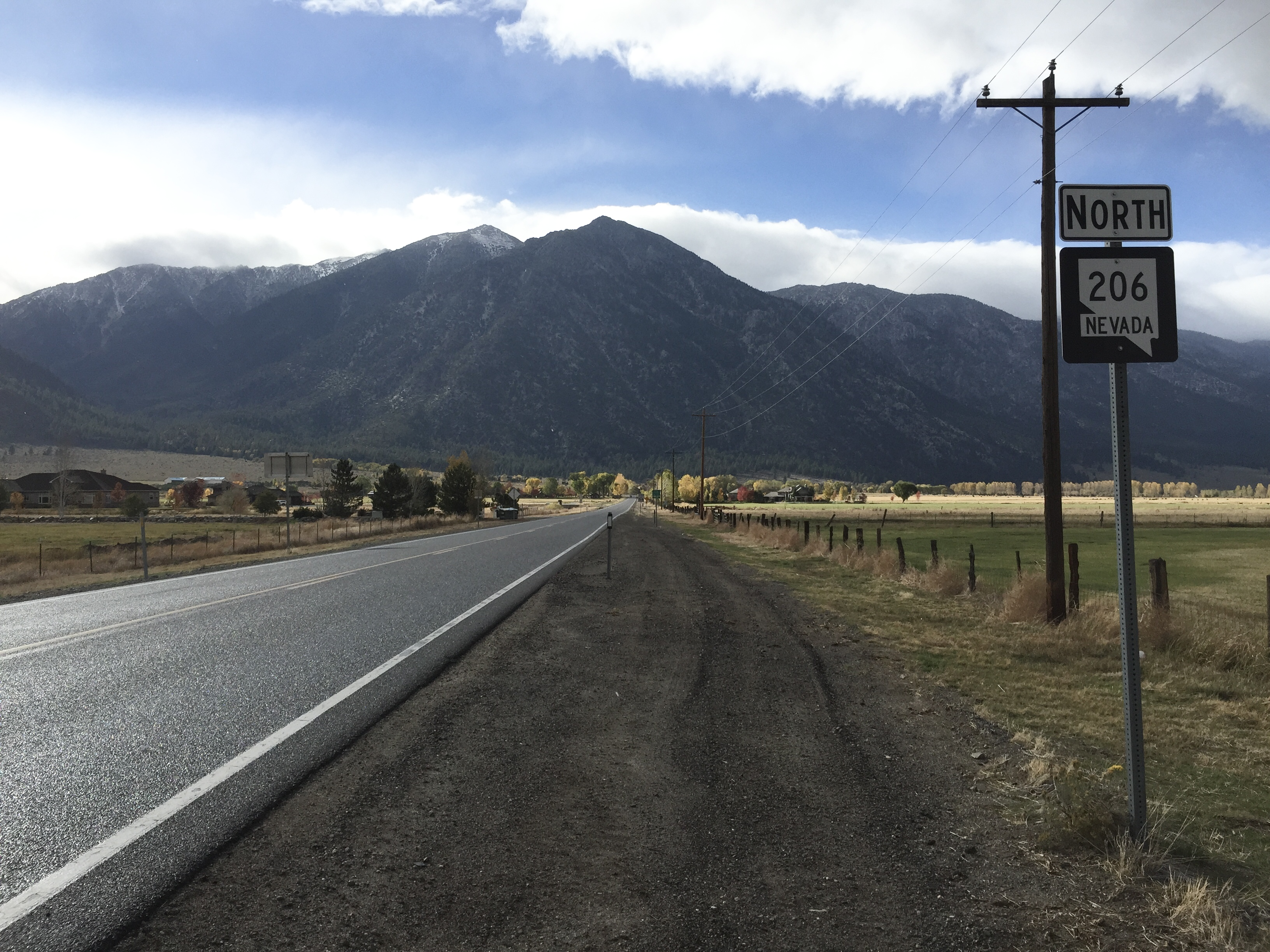
View north from the south end of SR 206.

State Route 206 begins at a junction with SR 88 in Centerville, 1 mile (1.6 km) from the California state line. From there, the route heads northwest with a gradual climb through the Sheridan area to meet SR 207 near Mottsville. The route then continues north, winding along the foothills of the Carson Range until reaching the town of Genoa. From there, SR 206 makes an immediate right at the intersection with Main Street to terminate at US 395 west of Minden–Tahoe Airport.

== History ==
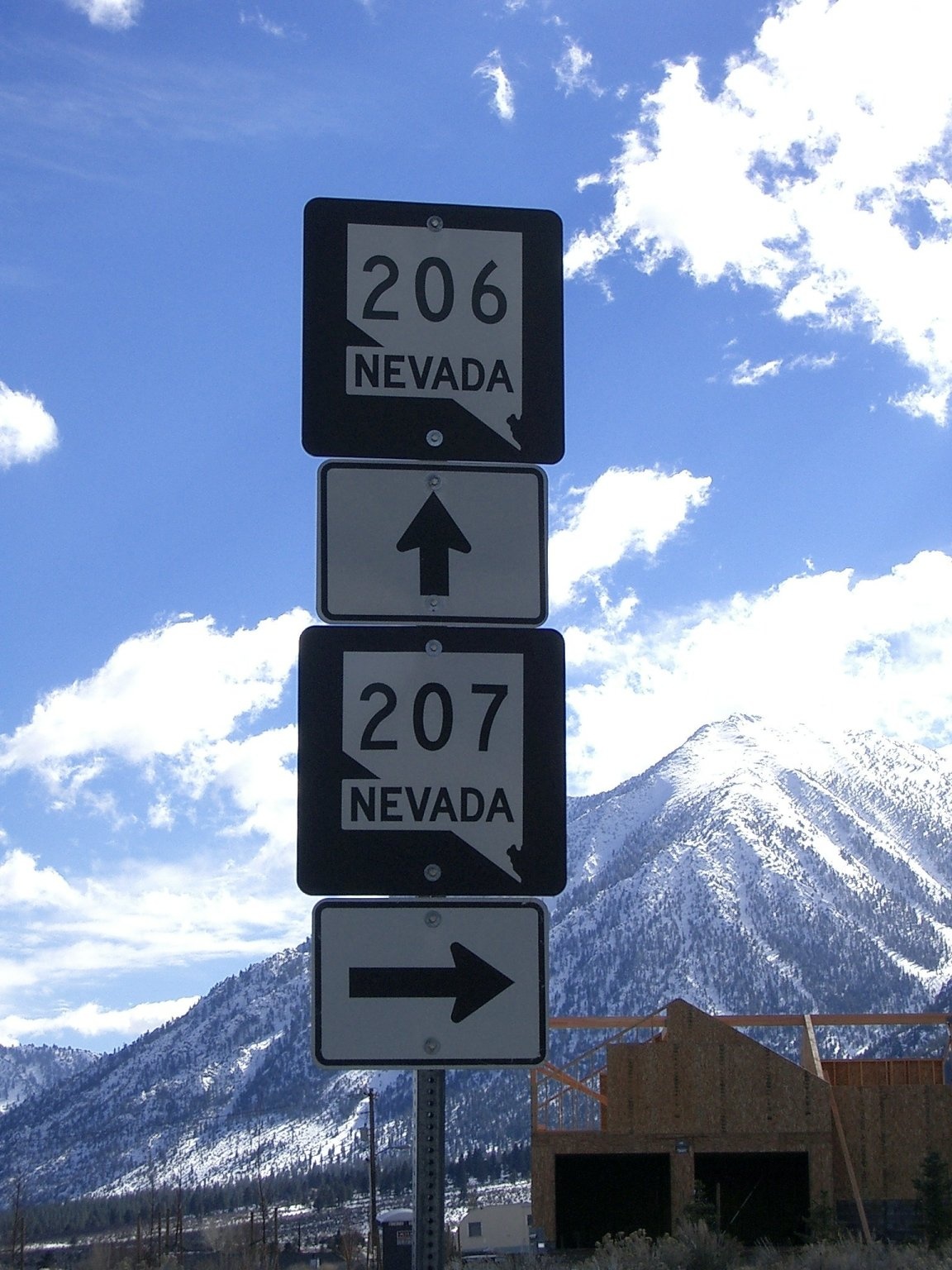
Signs along SR 206 approaching the junction of State Route 207, with Jobs Peak of the Carson Range in the background

Until the 1976 renumbering, the Genoa Lane section of SR 206 was State Route 57, connecting Genoa to US 395. That route was defined by 1937. However, in the renumbering, SR 206 was assigned to return to US 395 using Jacks Valley Road rather than Genoa Lane. (The part of this from State Route 207 north to State Route 757 had been State Route 19; the rest was unnumbered.) Genoa Lane was assigned State Route 758. By 1995, the piece north of Genoa was removed, and SR 206 was realigned to use SR 758.

== Major intersections ==
The entire route is in Douglas County.

Location	mi	km	Destinations	Notes
	0.00	0.00	SR 88 (Woodford Road) – Minden, Woodfords	
			SR 207 (Kingsbury Grade) – Kingsbury, South Lake Tahoe	
			SR 757 (Muller Lane)	
	15.43	24.83	US 395 – Minden, Carson City	
1.000 mi = 1.609 km; 1.000 km = 0.621 mi
