= Nevada State Route 207 =

Highway in Nevada

State Route 207
- Kingsbury Grade
- Nevada State Route 207, highlighted in red

Route information
- Maintained by NDOT
- Length: 11.082 mi (17.835 km)
- Existed: 1976–present

Major junctions
- West end: US 50 at Stateline-Kingsbury line
- East end: SR 206 west of Gardnerville

Location
- Country: United States
- State: Nevada
- Counties: Douglas

Highway system
- Nevada State Highway System; Interstate; US; State; Pre‑1976; Scenic
← SR 206	→ SR 208

State Route 207 (SR 207) is an 11.082-mile (17.835 km) state highway in western Douglas County, Nevada, United States. Commonly known as the Kingsbury Grade, it is one of three Nevada highways that connect the western edge of the state to the Lake Tahoe region through the Carson Range. The route was part of State Route 19 prior to 1976.

== Route description ==
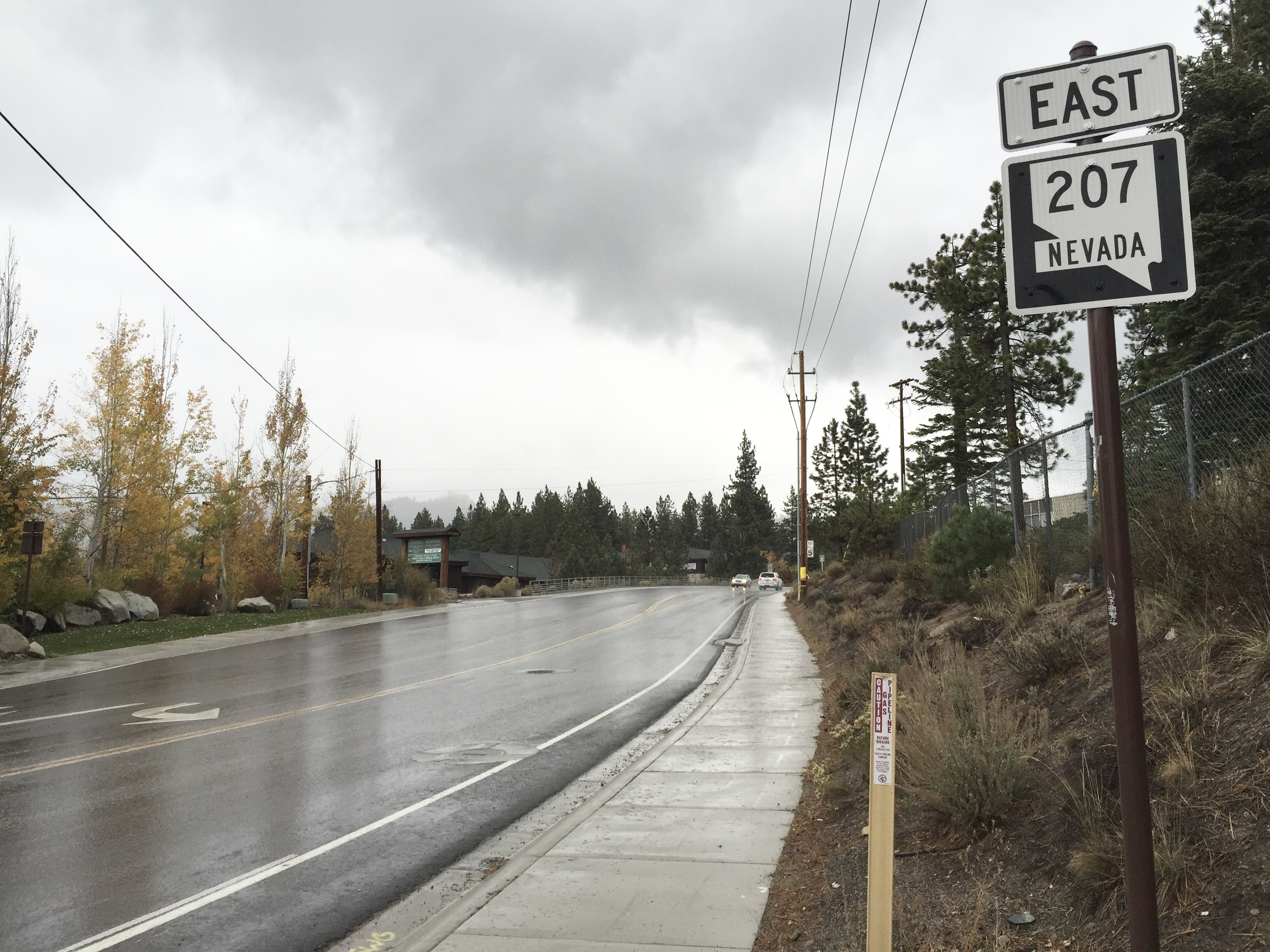
View from the west end of SR 207 in Stateline looking eastbound, October 2015

SR 207 begins at a junction with U.S. Route 50 in Stateline, less than 1 mile (1.6 km) from the California state line near the southern shores of Lake Tahoe. From there, the route heads eastward on an uphill climb through the Kingsbury area to travel through Daggett Pass (elevation 7,344 feet [2,238 m]).

After exiting the pass, SR 207 continues its trek eastward through Toiyabe National Forest lands. It goes through several switchbacks, eventually turning southward as it descends the mountains. The road goes down an escarpment to the Carson Valley floor. SR 207 comes to an end at its junction with Foothill Road (SR 206), at the site of Mottsville west of Gardnerville.

== History ==
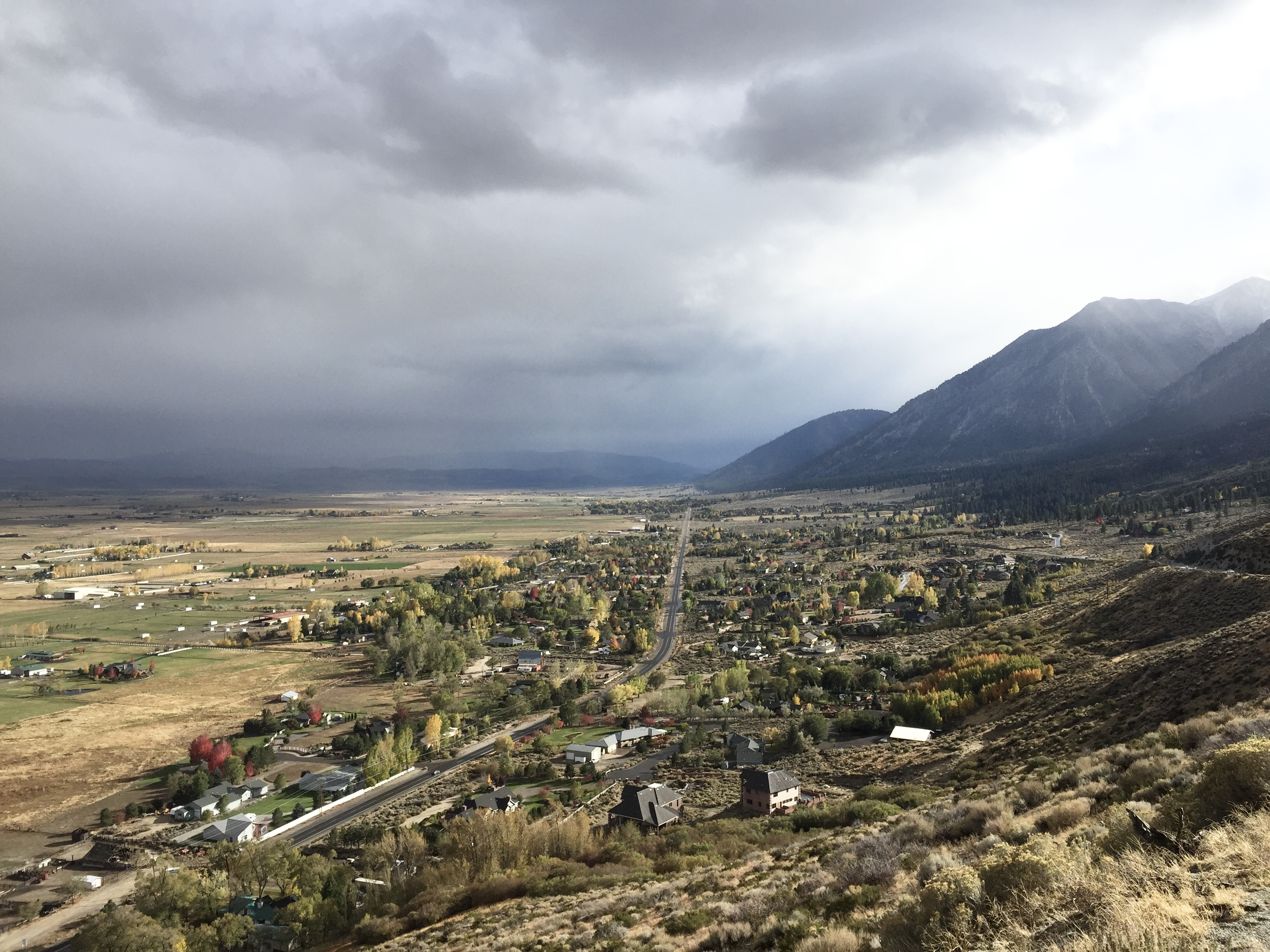
View south towards Mottsville, Nevada and the Carson Valley from SR 207, October 2015

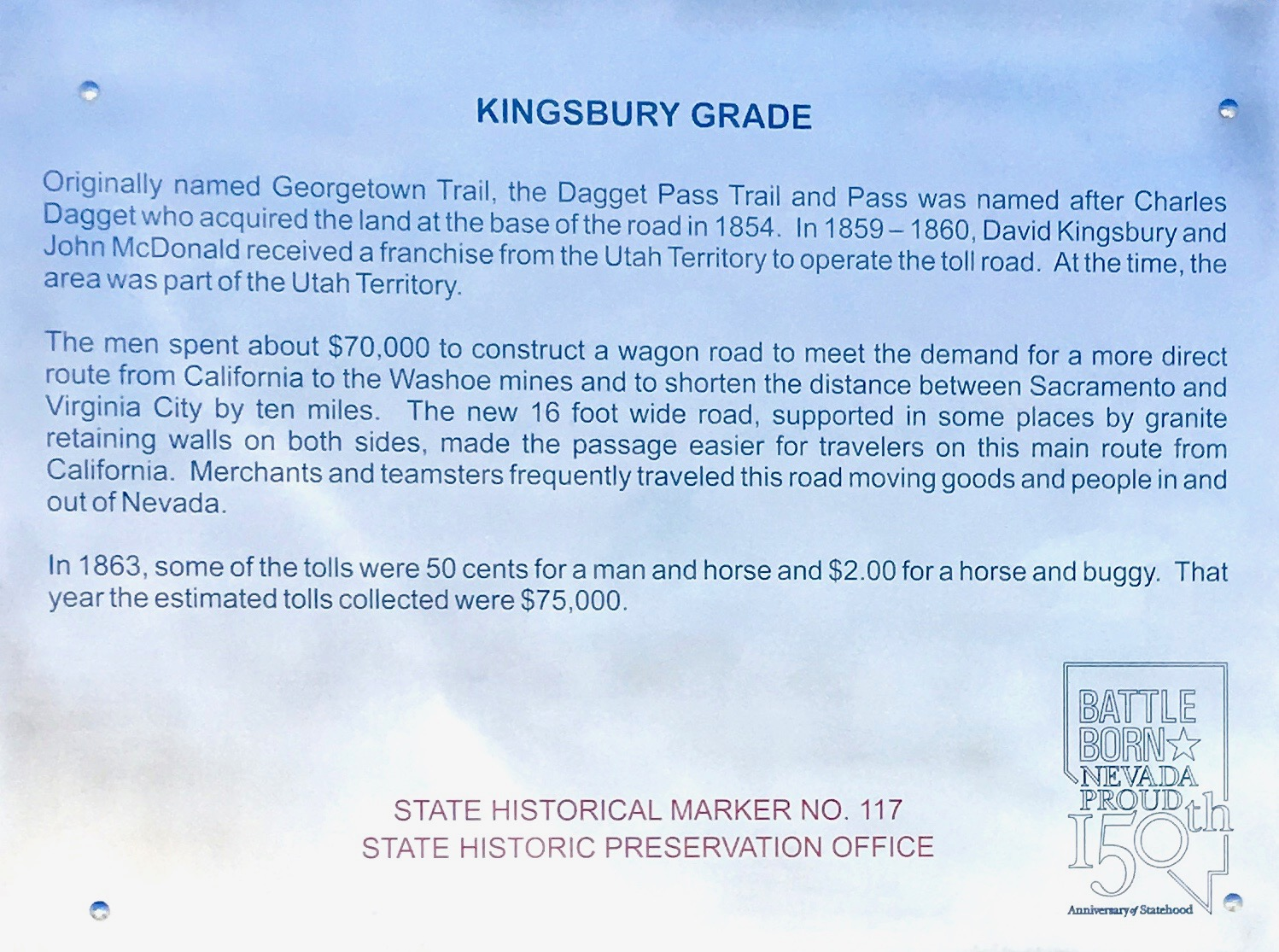
Historical marker #117

A road connecting Lake Tahoe to the Carson Valley, situated in the approximate location of today's SR 207, appears on Nevada state maps as early as 1919. By 1929, this unimproved road was included in the state highway system as the northwestern end of the former SR 19, a longer route stretching from Lake Tahoe through Minden and south to the California state line near Holbrook. This section of the former SR 19 was 13 miles (21 km) long, about 9 miles (14 km) of which comprised the Kingsbury Grade portion of highway. SR 19 through the mountains remained unimproved for many years; the route was not paved until 1967. By 1968, the eastern end of the Kingsbury Grade was moved southwards to line up with what is now Mottsville Lane, mirroring the approximately 11 miles (18 km) alignment of the present highway.

Following the realignment, the Kingsbury Grade section of SR 19 was not altered until the 1976 renumbering of Nevada's state highway system on July 1, 1976. In that process, this portion of SR 19 was assigned to the new SR 207. This change was first seen on state highway maps in 1978. Also included in the new SR 207 was the 3-mile (4.8 km) section of Mottsville Lane which connects Kingsbury Grade to SR 88, making SR 207 about 14 miles (23 km) long; however, this section appears to have been removed from the route by 1983. The route has been largely unchanged since.

== Major intersections ==
The entire route is in Douglas County.

Location	mi	km	Destinations	Notes
Stateline–Kingsbury line	0.000	0.000	US 50 – Carson City, South Lake Tahoe	Western terminus
Mottsville	11.082	17.835	SR 206 (Foothill Road) – Genoa	Eastern terminus
Mottsville	11.082	17.835	Mottsville Lane – Minden, Gardnerville	Continuation beyond SR 206
1.000 mi = 1.609 km; 1.000 km = 0.621 mi

== See also ==
- List of state routes in Nevada
- List of highways numbered 207
