= Nevada State Route 757 =

Highway in Nevada

State Route 757
- Muller Lane
- SR 757 highlighted in red

Route information
- Maintained by NDOT
- Length: 3.182 mi (5.121 km)
- Existed: 1976–present

Major junctions
- West end: SR 206 south of Genoa
- East end: US 395 in Minden

Location
- Country: United States
- State: Nevada

Highway system
- Nevada State Highway System; Interstate; US; State; Pre‑1976; Scenic
| ← SR 756 | → SR 758 |

State Route 757 (SR 757) is a state highway in Douglas County, Nevada. Formerly a part of State Route 19, the route connects the Genoa area to the Johnson Lane area.

== Route description ==
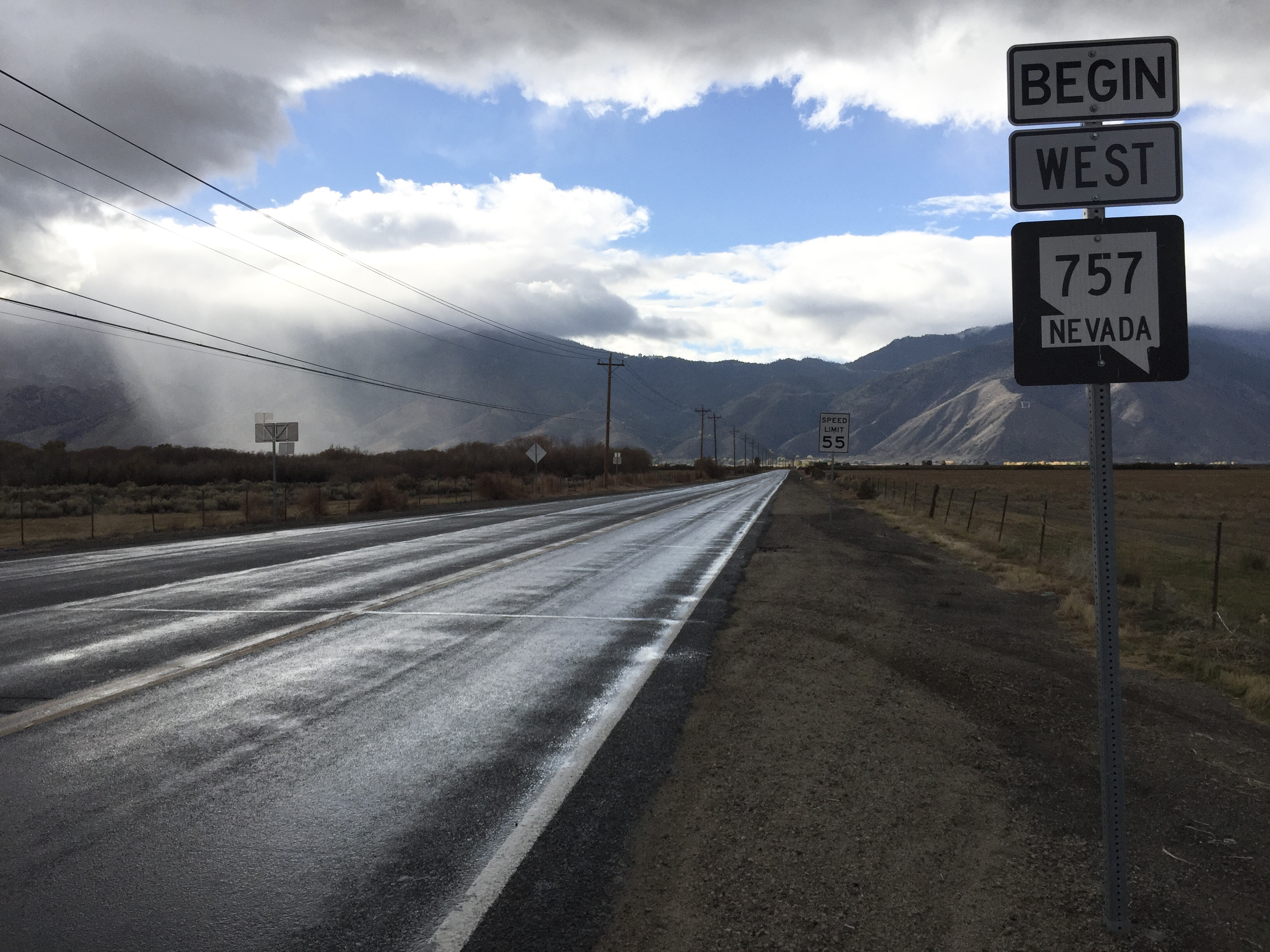
View at the east end of SR 757 looking westbound

State Route 757 begins on Muller Lane at a junction with Foothill Road (State Route 206) on the west side of the Carson Valley just south of Genoa. From there, the highway heads due east along Muller Lane, passing through farmlands and open fields. The route crosses over the west and east forks of the Carson River on its trek. After about 3.2 miles (5.1 km), the route comes to an end at U.S. Route 395 just north of Minden.

== History ==
SR 757 was originally part of the much longer State Route 19

SR 757 originally carried the designation of the longer State Route 19. That route, designated by 1929, connected a branch of State Route 3 (now U.S. Route 50) near South Lake Tahoe to California southeast of Gardnerville. The 1941 edition of Nevada's state highway map is the earliest to show this portion of the highway in its present alignment. The route was paved by 1948.

Nevada started renumbering its state highways on July 1, 1976. At that time, the Muller Lane portion of SR 19 was reassigned to State Route 757. The new number was not shown on the official state map right away; the 1978–1979 edition of the state's tourist map continued to show SR 57 unchanged. The road was still shown on state maps without a route number in 1982. SR 757 was finally shown as a numbered highway on the 1991–1992 edition of the official state map.

== Major intersections ==
The entire route is in Douglas County.

| Location | mi | km | Destinations | Notes |
|---|---|---|---|---|
| | 0.000 | 0.000 | SR 206 – Genoa | |
| Minden | 3.182 | 5.121 | US 395 – Carson City, Gardnerville | |
1.000 mi = 1.609 km; 1.000 km = 0.621 mi
