= Mike Crawford =

American football player (born 1974)

No. 56, 46, 44
- Position: Middle Linebacker

Personal information
- Born: October 29, 1974 (age 52); Reno, Nevada, U.S.
- Listed height: 6 ft 3 in (1.91 m)
- Listed weight: 245 lb (111 kg)

Career information
- High school: George Whittell (Zephyr Cove, Nevada)
- College: Nevada
- NFL draft: 1997: 6th round, 173rd overall pick

Career history
- Miami Dolphins (1997–1998); Las Vegas Outlaws (2001); Minnesota Vikings (2001)*
- * Offseason or practice squad member only

Career NFL statistics
- Games played: 7
- Stats at Pro Football Reference

Mike Crawford (born October 29, 1974) is an American former professional football player. He played professionally as a linebacker with of the Miami Dolphins on the National Football League (NFL) and the Las Vegas Outlaws of the XFL.

== Early life ==
Crawford attended George Whittell High School in Zephyr Cove, Nevada. He was named all-conference and all-state honors. His freshman year, he played soccer. The football team was losing a bunch of seniors and needed Crawford. He started playing his sophomore year. His senior year his team won the Nevada state championship. Besides playing football, Crawford played varsity basketball and was a member of the golf team for two years.

== College career ==
Crawford walked on his sophomore year and saw playing time in 10 games. As a junior in the 1995 season, Crawford was named second-team All Big West with 110 tackles. He recorded 17 tackles against San Diego State. He recorded 111 tackles and was named MVP of the 1996 Las Vegas Bowl where he had 23 tackles, 4 sacks, and 1 interception.

== Professional career ==
Crawford was drafted with the 173rd overall pick in the sixth round by the Miami Dolphins in the 1997 NFL draft. Crawford was cut, re-signed and moved from practice squad to active roster multiple times his rookie year. He appeared in 7 games his rookie season and registered four tackles. He was a member of the Dolphins in 1998 and again become the teammate of former Nevada Wolfpack Quarterback John Dutton, who was drafted in the 1998 NFL draft. In 2000, Crawford was signed by the Las Vegas Outlaws of the XFL. In the 2001 season he recorded 25 tackles. In 1999 Mike returned to UNR for one semester to receive his bachelor's degree. In 2001 Mike was picked up by Dennis Greene of the Minnesota Vikings. Mike played the 2001–2002 season with the Vikings but experienced a career ending injury during the pre-season; he finished the season on the IR list.

== Personal life ==
Crawford was known for being a daredevil in his early life. He was notorious for jumping off buildings or cliffs into snowbanks and water features. On the day he was drafted by the Dolphins, Crawford jumped off his mother's roof into a pond due to his excitement. When Crawford was a member of the Dolphins he made a fashion statement with bright Chalk-White dyed hair. According to Crawford and his friends, during a camping trip near Lake Tahoe, he had an interaction where he wrestled a bear. In 2016 he was inducted into the Nevada Hall of Fame. He now works at ITS logistics and lives with his 3 daughters and wife.
