= Nevada State Route 172 =

Highway in Nevada

State Route 172
- Hoover Dam Access Road
- SR 172 highlighted in red

Route information
- Maintained by NDOT
- Length: 1.365 mi (2.197 km)
- Existed: October 19, 2010–present

Major junctions
- West end: I-11 / US 93 / US 93 Bus. northeast of Boulder City
- East end: Hoover Dam Access Road west of Hoover Dam

Location
- Country: United States
- State: Nevada
- County: Clark

Highway system
- Nevada State Highway System; Interstate; US; State; Pre‑1976; Scenic
← SR 171	→ SR 173

State Route 172 (SR 172) is a state highway in Clark County, Nevada. The route provides access to Hoover Dam from Interstate 11 (I-11)/U.S. Route 93 (US 93)/U.S. Route 93 Business.

== Route description ==
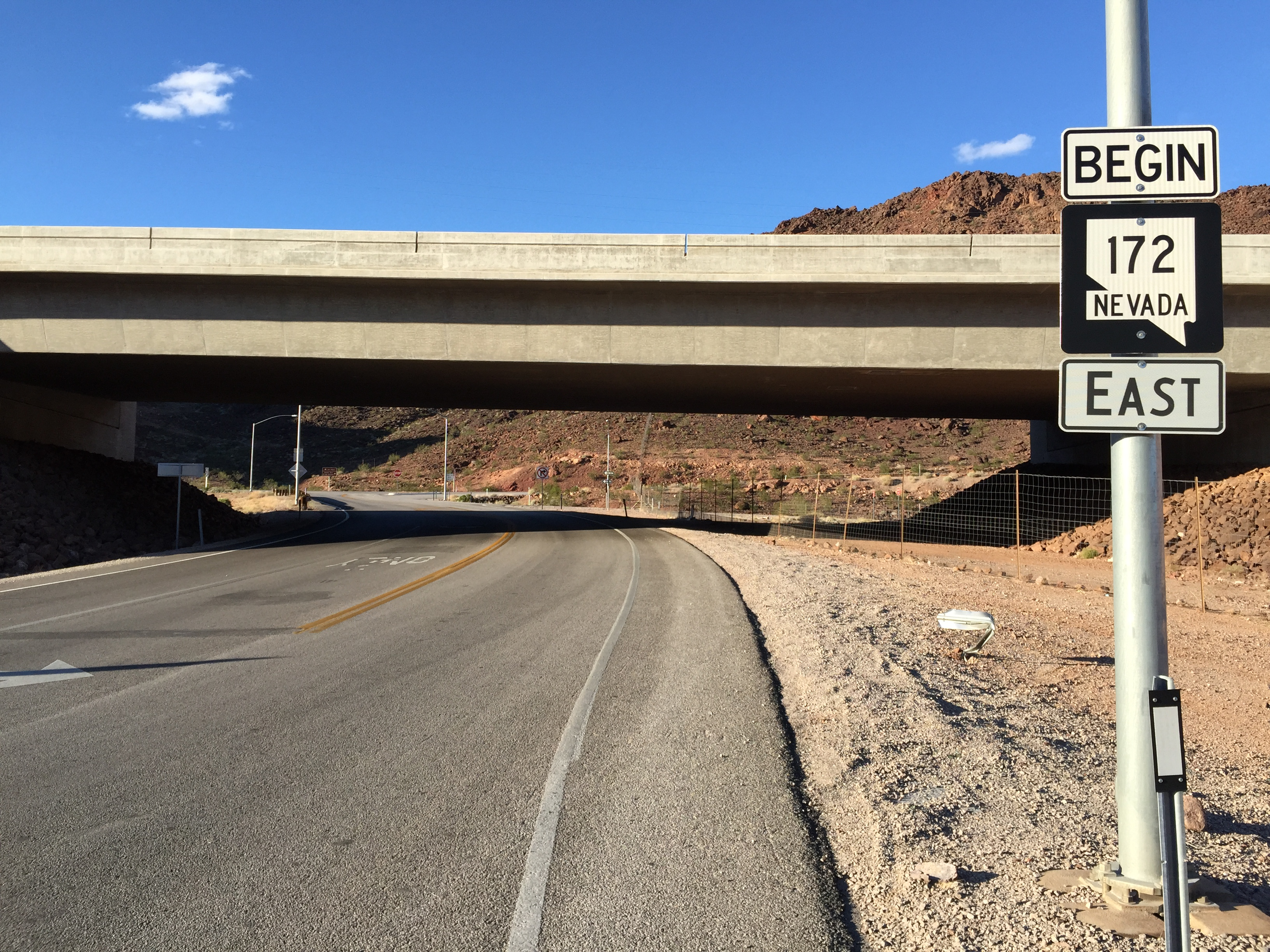
View from the west end of SR 172 looking eastbound with I-11/US 93/US 93 Bus. visible ahead as seen in 2015

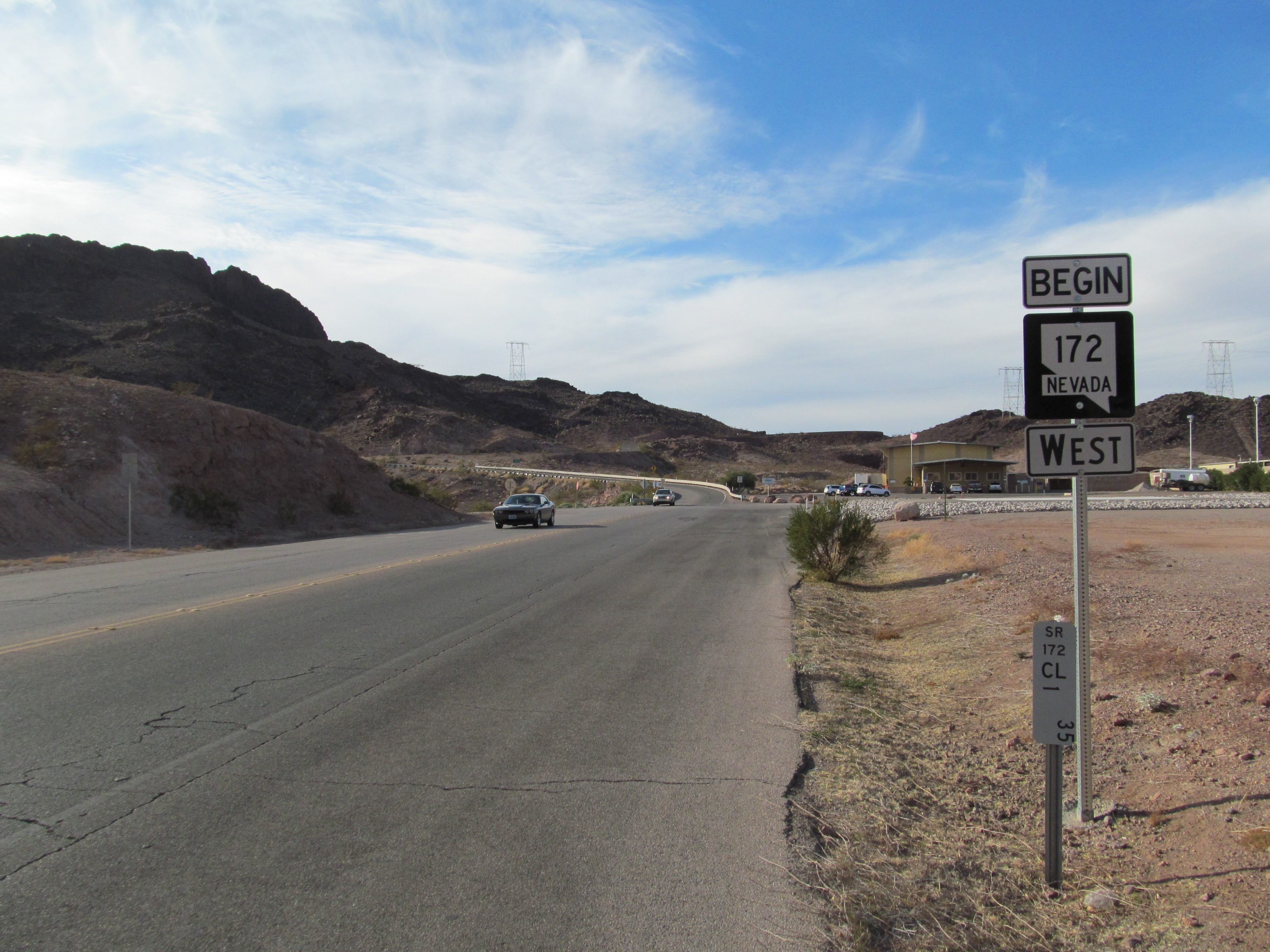
Westbound SR 172 as seen in 2012

State Route 172 begins on Gold Strike Pass Road and Goldstrike Canyon Road, at an interchange with I-11/US 93/US 93 Bus. approximately 5 miles (8.0 km) northeast of downtown Boulder City. Proceeding northward for only a few feet, it turns right onto the old Nevada Highway, the original route of US 93. From there, the route travels eastward, following the curvy mountainside over Rough Summit headed toward Hoover Dam. Shortly after passing the turnoff for the Lakeview scenic viewpoint, the SR 172 designation ends 1.61 miles (2.59 km) west of the Arizona state line, just prior to a security checkpoint at the boundary with the Bureau of Reclamation's Hoover Dam Reservation. While the state highway designation ends at this point, the Hoover Dam Access Road continues eastward, passing the Mike O'Callaghan–Pat Tillman Memorial Bridge Plaza, the Hoover Dam visitor center and then crosses the dam itself into Arizona. However, it only runs a short distance in that state before looping through a new parking area at a helipad to return the way it came, the original road past that point being blocked off to prevent all but dam personnel from continuing further south.

== History ==
SR 172 was originally part of US 93. US 93 was rerouted onto the Hoover Dam Bypass when construction was completed on October 19, 2010 and the new state highway was designated over the old route.

== Major intersections ==
The entire route is in Lake Mead National Recreation Area, Clark County.

mi	km	Destinations	Notes
0.000	0.000	I-11 / US 93 (Purple Heart Highway) / US 93 Bus. north (Boulder City Parkway) / Goldstrike Canyon Road – Las Vegas, Kingman, Boulder City, Lake Mead	Partial dumbbell interchange; western terminus; I-11 exit 2; US 93 Bus. north is former US 93 north/US 466 west
1.365	2.197	Hoover Dam security checkpoint	Eastern terminus; road continues beyond security checkpoint as Hoover Dam Access Road; no direct access to Arizona; former US 93 south/US 466 east
1.000 mi = 1.609 km; 1.000 km = 0.621 mi
