= Nevada State Route 19 =

Former highway in Nevada

State Route 19 (SR 19) is a former state highway in Douglas County, Nevada. The route was designated by 1929. As designated, it connected a branch of State Route 3 (now U.S. Route 50) near South Lake Tahoe to California southeast of Gardnerville near Topaz Lake.

SR 19 followed the present-day alignment of State Routes 206, a small portion of State Route 207, and all of State Route 757. The route was cosigned with State Route 3 between Minden and Topaz Lake, then dropped SR 3 as it headed south into California. The portions of the route south of what is now SR 757 were later overlapped by US 395.
