= U.S. Route 93 Business (Nevada) =

Road in Nevada

U.S. Route 93 Business
- Boulder City Parkway

Route information
- Maintained by NDOT
- Length: 9.517 mi (15.316 km)
- Existed: May 23, 2017–present
- History: Previously existed as US 93; signed in 2019

Major junctions
- South end: I-11 / US 93 / SR 172 in Lake Mead NRA
- SR 173 in Boulder City
- North end: I-11 / US 93 / US 95 / Railroad Pass Casino Road in Henderson

Location
- Country: United States
- State: Nevada
- County: Clark

Highway system
- United States Numbered Highway System; List; Special; Divided; Nevada State Highway System; Interstate; US; State; Pre‑1976; Scenic

U.S. Route 93 Business (US 93 Bus.), officially named the Boulder City Parkway, is a business route of U.S. Route 93 (US 93) in Clark County, Nevada. The route provides access to Lake Mead and downtown Boulder City from Interstate 11 (I-11). The route was originally part of mainline US 93 before it was realigned around Boulder City along I-11.

== Route description ==
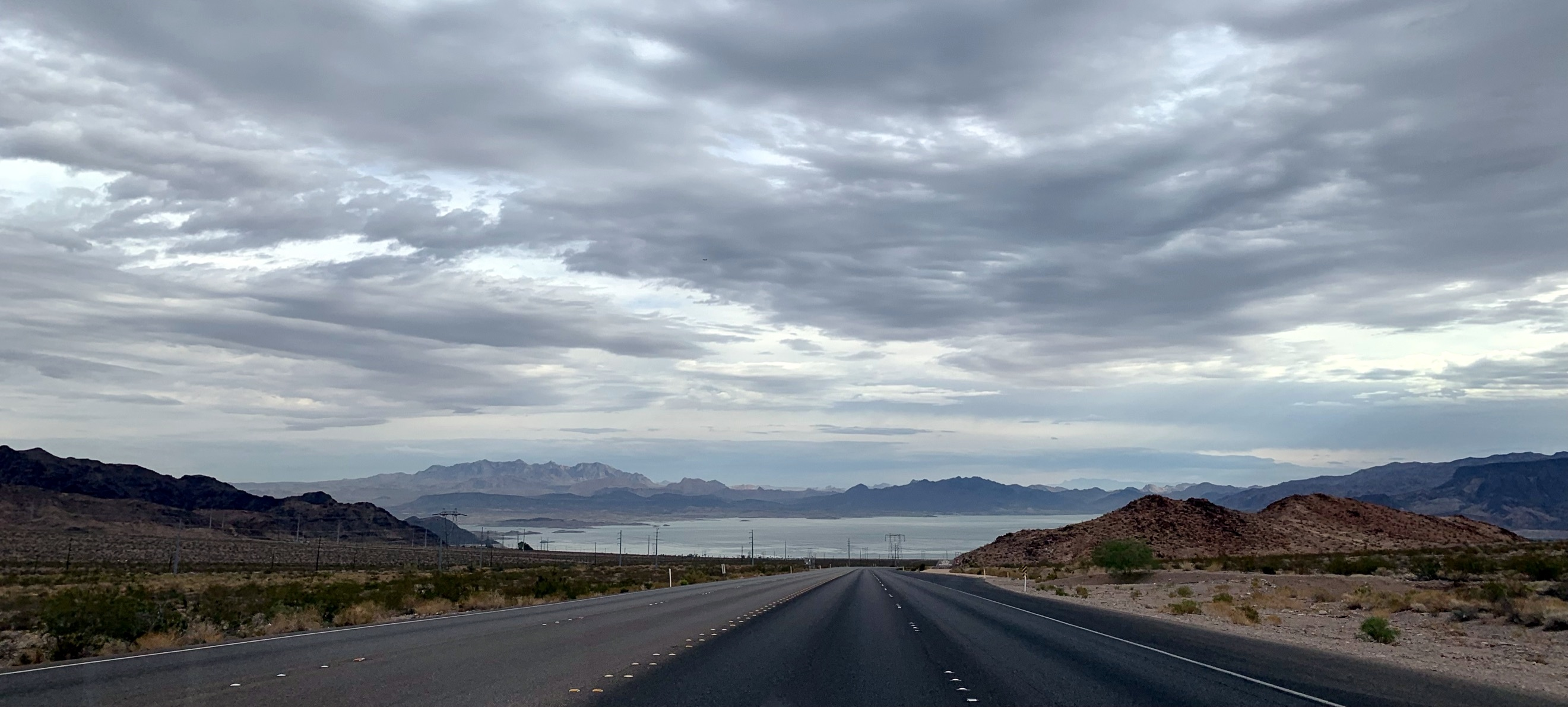
Southbound US 93 Bus. between Boulder City and the Hoover Dam as seen in 2021

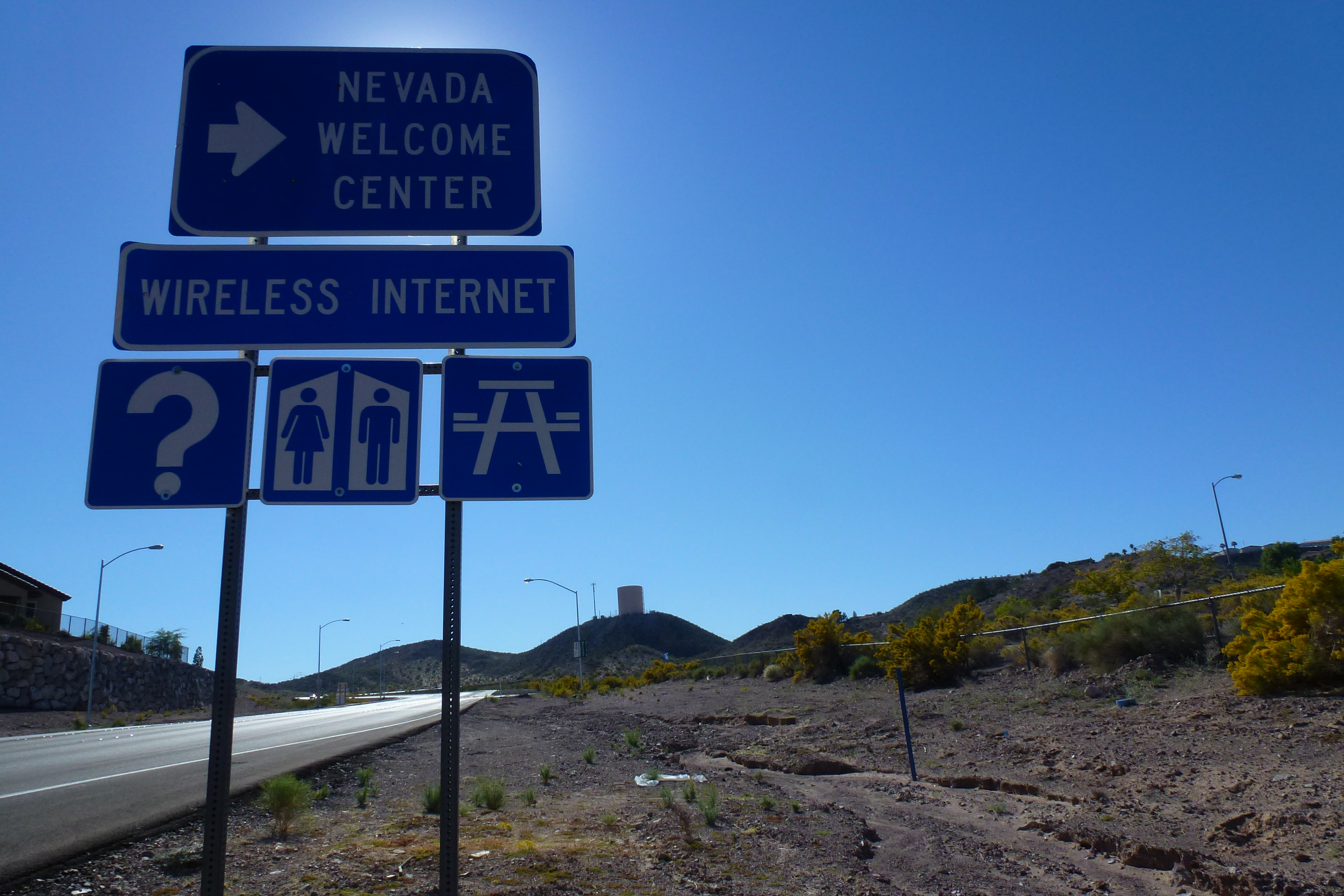
Sign pointing to a Nevada Welcome Center on southbound US 93 Bus. near Nevada Way as seen in 2012

US 93 Bus. begins at an interchange with I-11/US 93 and State Route 172 (SR 172) en route to Hoover Dam. From there, it proceeds northwest heading towards the Lake Mead National Recreation Area. In Boulder City, the route turns southwestward, heading towards downtown Boulder City. The route upgrades to a major arterial highway when upon leaving the urban area. US 93 Bus. ends at an interchange with I-11/US 93/US 95 at Railroad Pass in Henderson.

== History ==
Prior to the construction of I-11, US 93 Bus. had existed as the main route US 93 between Arizona and Las Vegas through Boulder City.

The Nevada Department of Transportation (NDOT) sent a request to the American Association of State Highway and Transportation Officials (AASHTO) to create US 93 Bus. in 2017. AASHTO's Special Committee on U.S. Route Numbering approved the new designation at their meeting on May 23, 2017, concurrently with a relocation of mainline US 93 to the alignment of the I-11 Boulder City Bypass then under construction. By 2019, after completion of the Boulder City Bypass, NDOT had officially designated the business route.

== Major intersections ==
The entire route is in Clark County. All exits are unnumbered.

Location	mi	km	Destinations	Notes
Lake Mead NRA	0.000	0.000	I-11 south / US 93 south (Purple Heart Highway) – Kingman	Interchange; southern terminus; I-11 exit 2
Lake Mead NRA	0.1– 0.3	0.16– 0.48	I-11 north / US 93 north (Purple Heart Highway) / SR 172 east (Hoover Dam Access Road) / Goldstrike Canyon Road – Las Vegas, Hoover Dam	Interchange northbound; roundabout southbound; I-11 exit 2; SR 172 east was formerly part of US 93 south/US 466 east
Lake Mead NRA	1.4	2.3	Lakeshore Road	To Lake Mead
Boulder City	7.0	11.3	Veterans Memorial Drive – Boulder City Municipal Airport	At-grade intersection
Boulder City	7.0	11.3	Southern end of freeway	
Boulder City	8.0	12.9	SR 173 south to US 95 south – Searchlight	SR 173 south was formerly part of US 95 south
Henderson	95.17	153.16	Railroad Pass Casino Road to US 95 south (I-11 south / US 93 south)	Northbound exit and southbound entrance; RPC Road north was formerly part of US 93/US 95 north/US 466 west; RPC Road south provides access to I-11 exit 15A
Henderson	95.17	153.16	I-11 north / US 93 north / US 95 north (Purple Heart Highway) – Las Vegas	Northern terminus; I-11 exit 15B
1.000 mi = 1.609 km; 1.000 km = 0.621 mi
