= Nevada State Route 88 =

State highway in Douglas County, Nevada, United States

State Route 88
- Woodfords Road
- SR 88 highlighted in red

Route information
- Maintained by NDOT
- Length: 7.868 mi (12.662 km)
- Existed: 1957–present
- History: Established as SR 37 by 1935

Major junctions
- South end: SR 88 at the California state line near Fredericksburg, CA
- SR 206 at Gardnerville Ranchos; SR 756 at Gardnerville Ranchos
- North end: US 395 in Minden

Location
- Country: United States
- State: Nevada
- Counties: Douglas

Highway system
- Nevada State Highway System; Interstate; US; State; Pre‑1976; Scenic
← I-80	→ US 93

State Route 88 (SR 88) is a 7.868-mile (12.662 km) north–south state highway in the Carson Valley in western Douglas County, Nevada, United States. It runs from the California state line along Woodfords Road to U.S. Route 395 in Minden. Prior to 1957, the highway existed as State Route 37.

The highway continues into California as California State Route 88; both highways are closely related. Although Route 88 is a secondary route today, the highway is a historical route from when Carson Pass was a major crossing of the Sierra Nevada.

== Route description ==
The route enters Nevada from California near Woodfords, California. Just after exiting the Sierra Nevada via the Carson River. The road loosely follows the river and the Carson Valley on the western edge of communities of Centerville, Gardnerville Ranchos, and Minden where the highway ends at a Y junction with U.S. Route 395. Despite the fact that California State Route 88 is an east-west highway, Nevada State Route 88 follows a nearly straight north-south path. There are no curves along its entire length other than at the north end to intersect with US 395.

== History ==
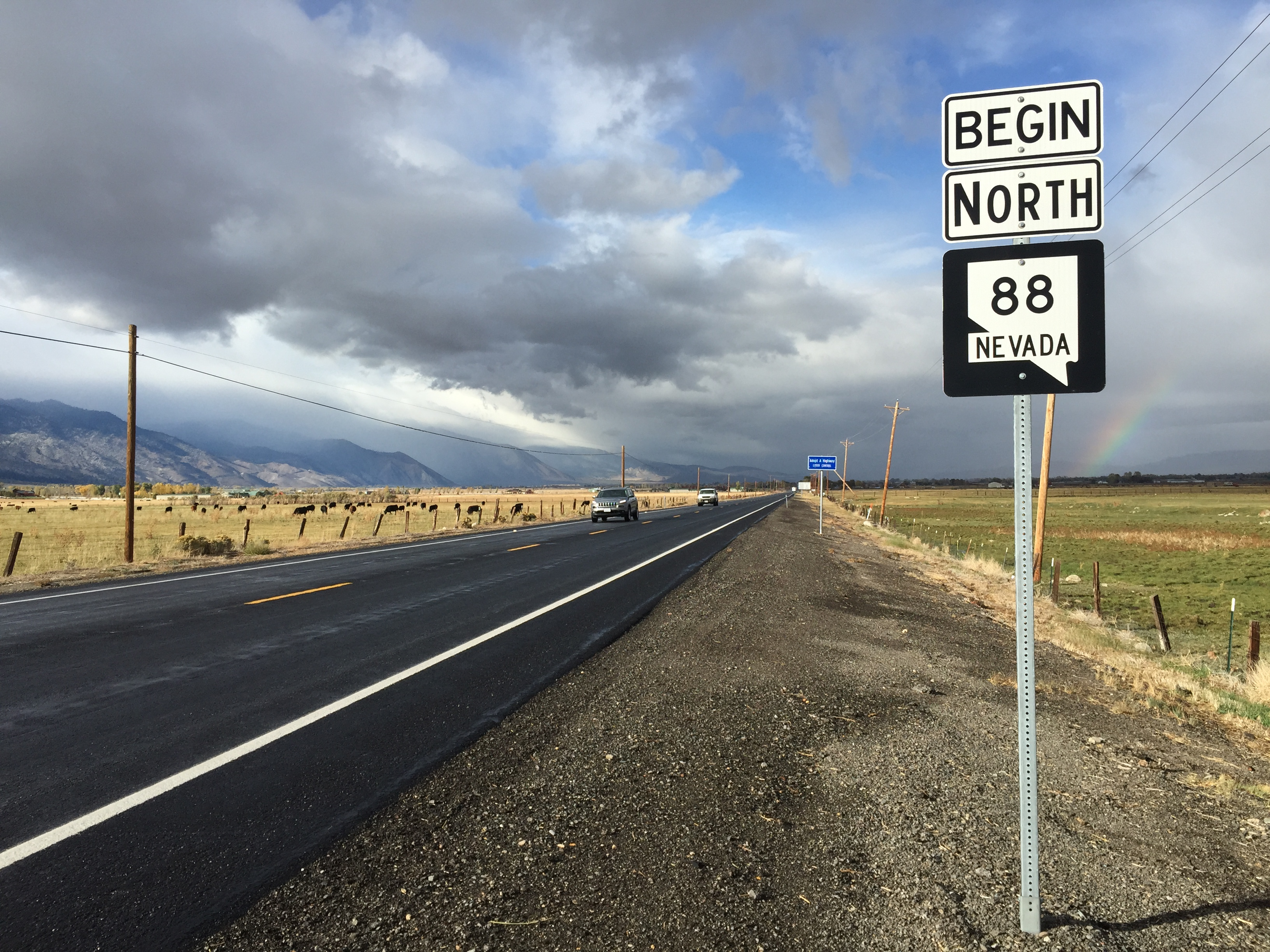
View from the south end of SR 88 looking northbound, October 2015

The highway shares much of its history with its California counterpart. Both formed part of a trail that went under such names as "Emigrant Trail", "Kit Carson Emigrant Trail" which has existed since the 1840s. The Carson Pass route was one of two primary divisions of the California Trail. The trail's use diminished with the establishment of the First transcontinental railroad which was completed in 1869 and follows a path closer to modern Interstate 80 across the Sierra Nevada. Newer names for the road have included "Carson Pass Road" after Carson Pass in California.

Woodsford Road first appears on state maps in 1934 as a gravel and graded highway. By 1935, State Route 37 had been established along the roadway. The route remained unchanged until being renumbered as State Route 88 by 1957.

== Major intersections ==
The entire route is in Douglas County.

Location	mi	km	Destinations	Notes
	0.00	0.00	SR 88 west – Woodfords, Jackson	Southern terminus; continuation beyond California state line
Gardnerville Ranchos			SR 206 north (Fairview Lane) / Dressler Lane – Lake Tahoe	
Gardnerville Ranchos			SR 756 east (Centerville Lane) – Gardnerville	
			Mottsville Lane – SR 207 (Kingsbury Grade) – Lake Tahoe	
Minden	7.868	12.662	US 395 – Carson City, Reno, Bishop	Northern terminus
1.000 mi = 1.609 km; 1.000 km = 0.621 mi

== See also ==
- List of state routes in Nevada
- List of highways numbered 88
