= Mottsville, Nevada =

Unincorporated community in Nevada, US

- Unincorporated community
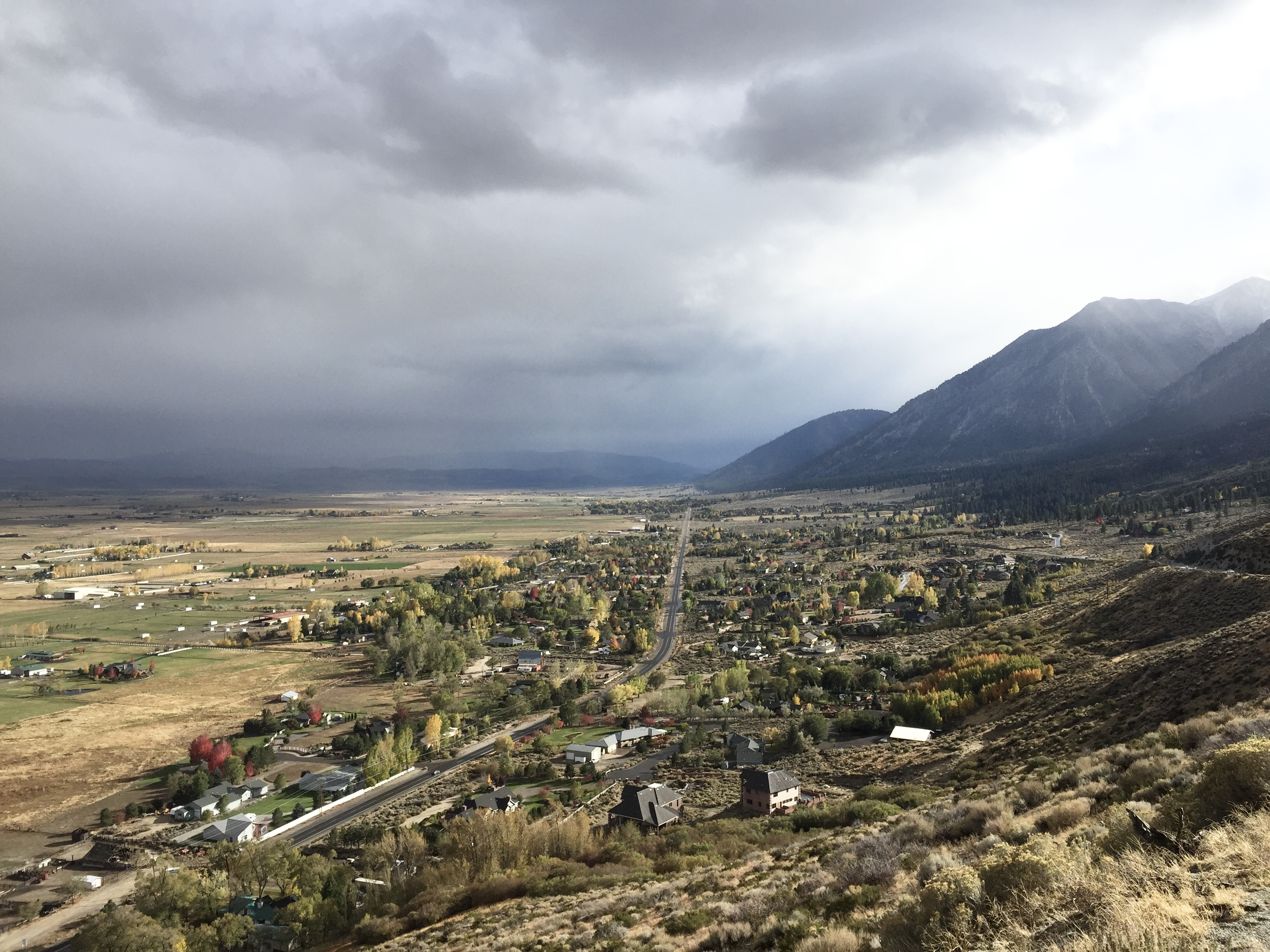
- Mottsville, viewed from SR 207

- Location within Nevada
- Coordinates: 38°55′43″N 119°50′16″W
- Country: United States
- State: Nevada
- County: Douglas
- Elevation: 4,777 ft (1,456 m)
- Time zone: UTC-8 (Pacific (PST))
  - Summer (DST): UTC-7 (PDT)
- Area code: 775
- Nevada Historical Marker: 121
- GNIS feature ID: 860656

Mottsville is an unincorporated community within the Humboldt–Toiyabe National Forest on the western edge of the Carson Valley in northwestern Douglas County, Nevada, United States. Mottsville is located at the junction of Nevada State Route 206 and Nevada State Route 207 3 miles (4.8 km) west-southwest of Minden.

== History ==
Settlement on the Emigrant Trail where Hiram Mott and son Israel settled in 1851

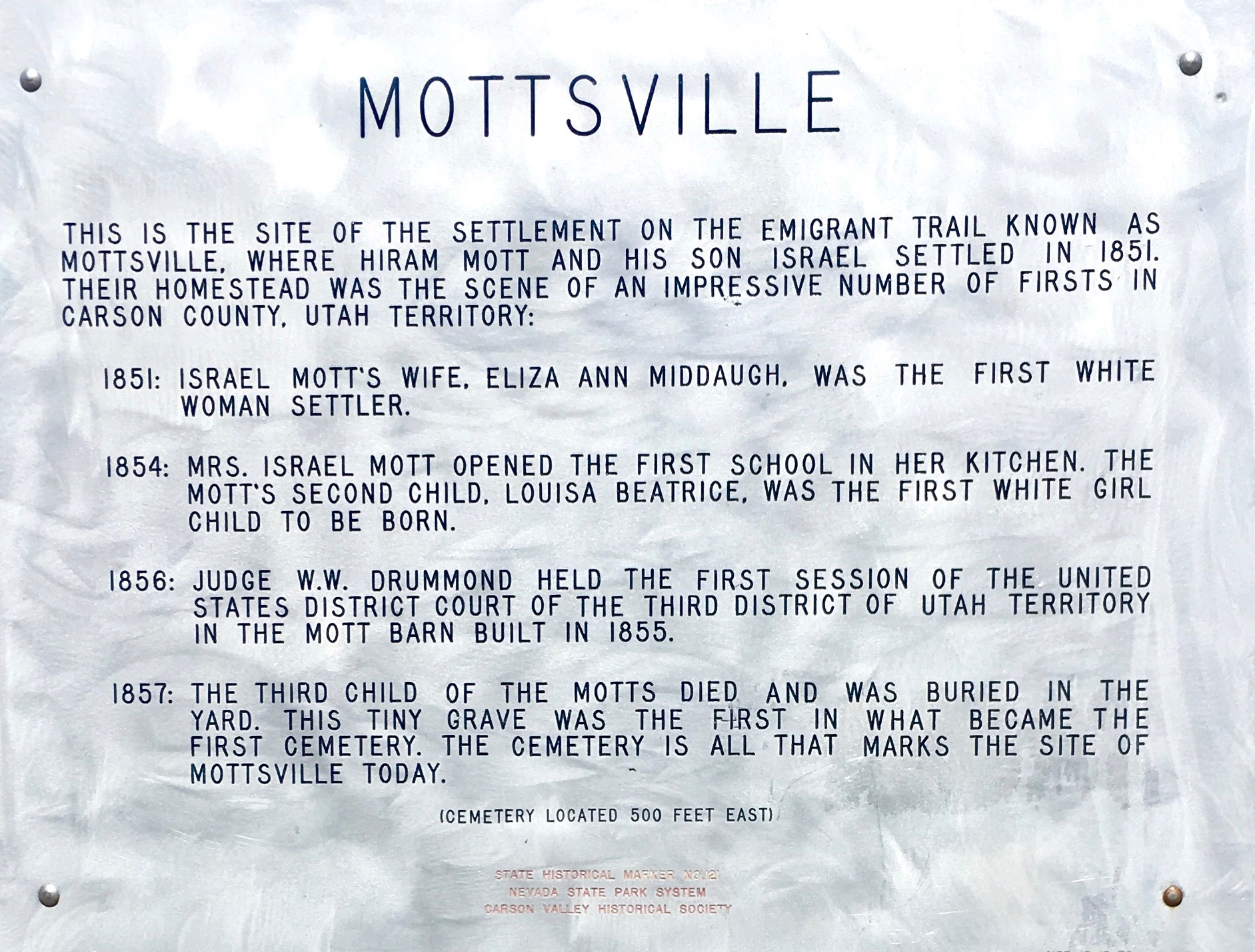
Mottsville, Nevada historical marker that commemorates early Nevada history
