= Nevada State Route 756 =

Highway in Nevada

State Route 756
- SR 756 highlighted in red

Route information
- Maintained by NDOT
- Length: 3.974 mi (6.396 km)
- Existed: 1976–present

Major junctions
- West end: SR 88 near Centerville
- East end: US 395 in Gardnerville

Location
- Country: United States
- State: Nevada
- County: Douglas

Highway system
- Nevada State Highway System; Interstate; US; State; Pre‑1976; Scenic
← SR 726	→ SR 757

State Route 756 (SR 756) is a state highway in Douglas County, Nevada. It connects Centerville to the town of Gardnerville. The route previously existed as State Route 56.

== Route description ==
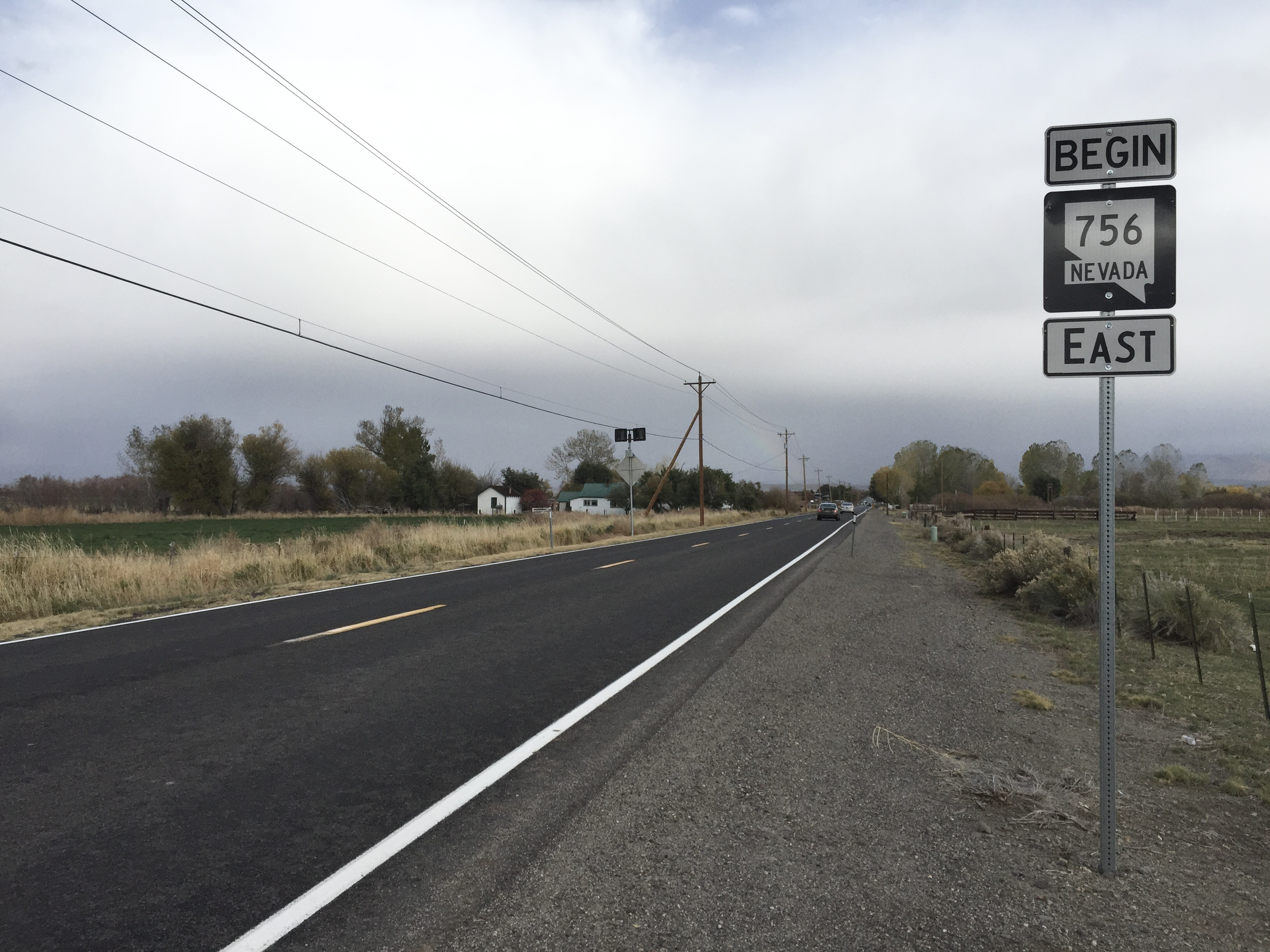
View at the west end of SR 756 looking eastbound

State Route 756 begins on Centerville Lane at its intersection with Woodfords Road (State Route 88) near the town of Centerville in the Carson Valley. From there, the route travels east through farmlands. After about 1 mile (1.6 km), the highway passes near homes on the northwest edge of the Gardnerville Ranchos area. Around the second mile, SR 756 turns northward and again passes through farm fields. The route crosses over the east fork of the Carson River and then enters the town limits of Gardenerville. SR 756 comes to an end at its intersection with Main Street (U.S. Route 395) in the middle of Gardnerville.

== History ==
SR 756 originated as State Route 56

The present-day highway first appears on official state maps in 1937. At that time, the road was paved and carried the State Route 56 designation. The routing appears to have remained unchanged since that time.

Nevada began renumbering its state highways on July 1, 1976. In that process, SR 56 was re-designated as State Route 756. This change was not made to the official Nevada map right away, as the 1978–1979 edition of the state's tourist map (which detailed many route number conversions) continued to show SR 56 without the new SR 756 designation. By 1982, the road was still shown on state maps, albeit without a route number. SR 756 was finally shown as a numbered highway on the 1991–1992 Nevada map.

== Major intersections ==
The entire route is in Douglas County.

Location	mi	km	Destinations	Notes
	0.000	0.000	SR 88 (Woodfords Road) – Minden, Woodfords	
Gardnerville	3.974	6.396	US 395 – Minden, Carson City, Bishop	
1.000 mi = 1.609 km; 1.000 km = 0.621 mi
