= Nevada State Route 173 =

State highway in Nevada

State Route 173
- Veterans Memorial Highway

Route information
- Maintained by NDOT
- Length: 1.075 mi (1.730 km)
- Existed: May 23, 2018–present

Major junctions
- South end: I-11 / US 93 / US 95 in Boulder City
- North end: US 93 Bus. / Cascata Drive in Boulder City

Location
- Country: United States
- State: Nevada
- County: Clark

Highway system
- Nevada State Highway System; Interstate; US; State; Pre‑1976; Scenic
← SR 172	→ SR 206

State Route 173 (SR 173) is a state highway in Clark County, Nevada. The route provides access to downtown Boulder City from U.S. Route 95 (US 95) to the south. The route was originally part of US 95 until the highway was realigned following the completion of Interstate 11 (I-11) around Boulder City.

The entire route of SR 173 is also part of the Veterans Memorial Highway.

== Route description ==
State Route 173 begins at an interchange with I-11/US 93/US 95 approximately 5 miles (8.0 km) southwest of downtown Boulder City. Proceeding northward, the highway ends at an interchange with US 93 Business.

== History ==
SR 173 was originally part of US 95. Upon the completion of Phase 1 on May 23, 2018, US 95 was rerouted onto the Boulder City Bypass, concurrent with I-11. The old route was redesignated State Route 173 while retaining the name of "Veterans Memorial Highway".

== Major intersections ==
The entire route is in Boulder City, Clark County.

mi	km	Destinations	Notes
0.000	0.000	US 95 south (Veterans Memorial Highway) – Searchlight, Laughlin, Needles	Continuation beyond southern terminus
0.000	0.000	I-11 / US 93 / US 95 north (Purple Heart Highway) – Kingman, Phoenix, Henderson, Las Vegas	Interchange; I-11 exit 14
1.075	1.730	US 93 Bus. (Boulder City Parkway) – Boulder City, Henderson, Las Vegas	Interchange; former US 93/US 95 north/US 466
1.075	1.730	Cascata Drive	Continuation beyond northern terminus
1.000 mi = 1.609 km; 1.000 km = 0.621 mi
