= Mormon Station State Historic Park =

State park in Nevada, United States

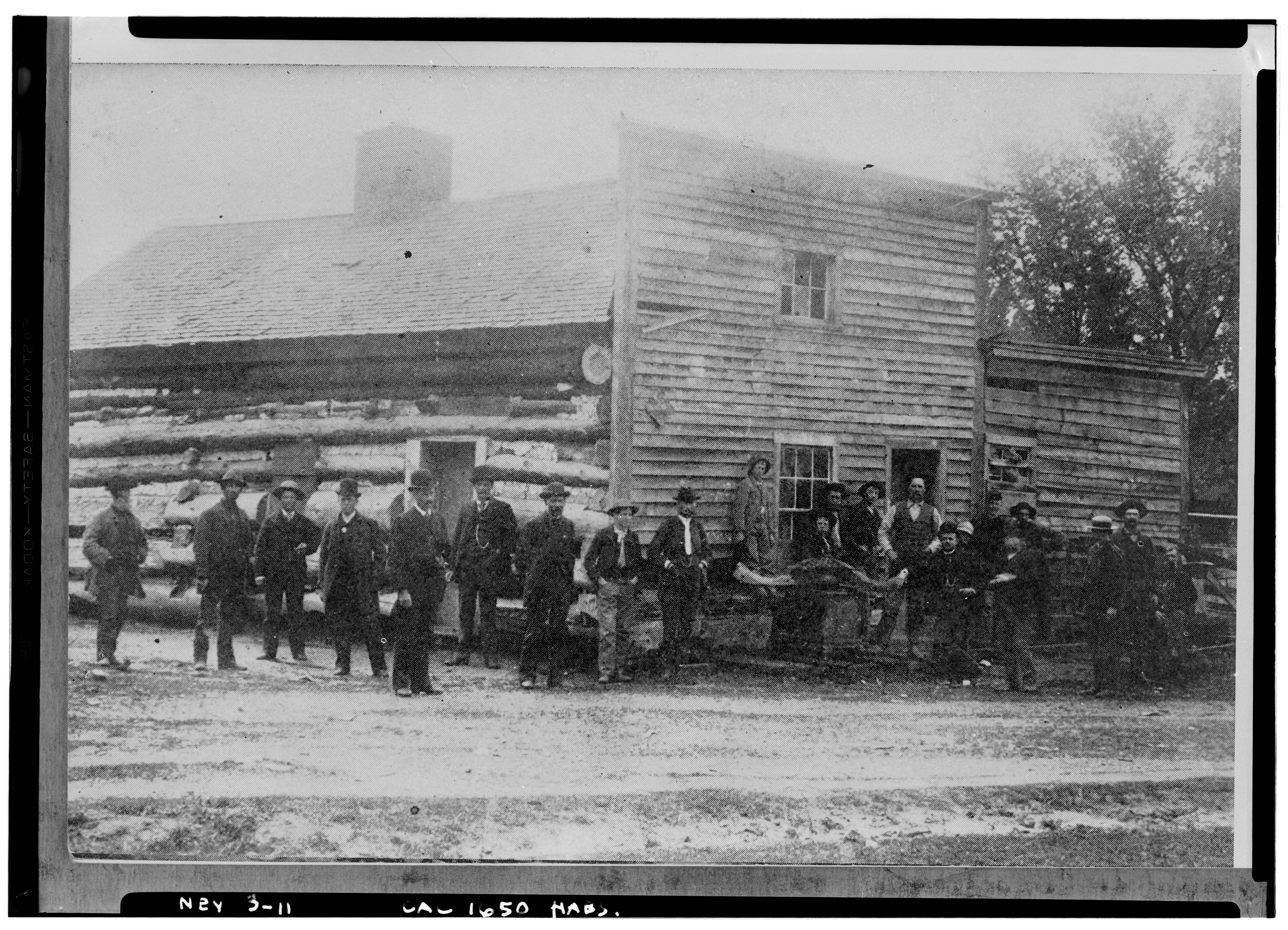
- The original Mormon Station trading post, prior to burning down in June 1910

- Location within Nevada
- Location: Genoa, Nevada, United States
- Coordinates: 39°00′16″N 119°50′43″W
- Area: 3.54 acres (1.43 ha)
- Elevation: 4,807 ft (1,465 m)
- Established: 1957
- Designation: Nevada state historic park
- Website: Official website

Mormon Station State Historic Park is a state park in downtown Genoa, Nevada, interpreting the site of the first permanent nonnative settlement in Nevada. Mormon Station was originally settled by Mormon pioneers and served as a respite for travelers on the Carson Route of the California Trail. The park offers artifacts and exhibits about the station's history housed in a replica of the 1851 trading post stockade which burned down in 1910.

== Preservation ==
In June 1910, a large fire swept through Genoa, destroying a number of structures, including what remained of the Mormon Station trading post. Reconstruction of the trading post structures began in 1947 with $5,000 provided by the Nevada Legislature. Legislation in 1955 authorized the transfer of management of the property to the Division of State Parks, which took place in 1957. The site is memorialized with a tablet erected by the Sons of Utah Pioneers in 1991 and Nevada Historical Marker 12.

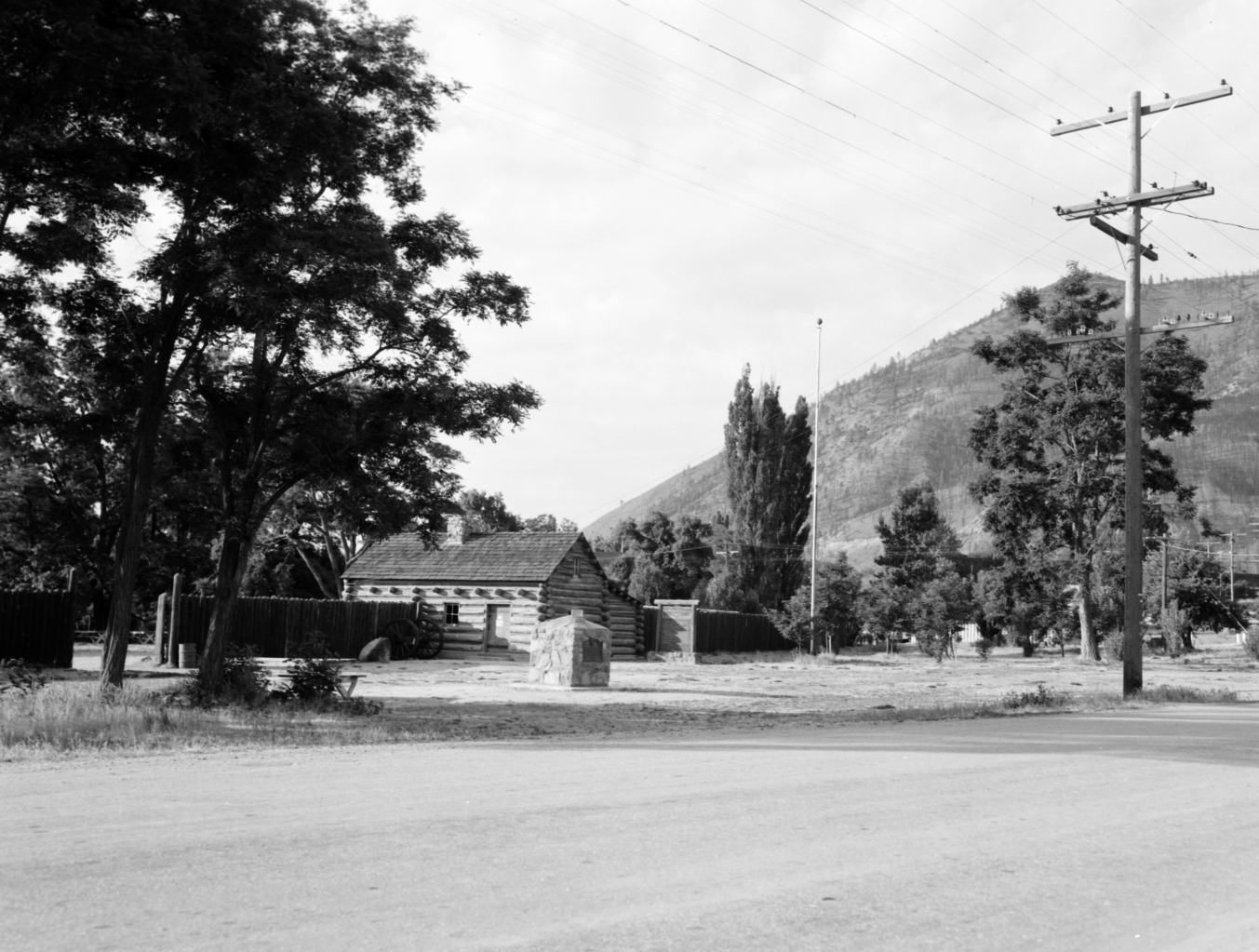
Reconstructed Mormon Station, 1958

== See also ==
- Old Las Vegas Mormon Fort State Historic Park
