= George Whittell High School =

Location
- 240 Warrior Way; Zephyr Cove, Nevada 89448; United States; 39°0′49″N 119°56′33″W

Information
- Type: Public
- School district: Douglas County School District
- Principal: Sean Ryan
- Teaching staff: 24.50 (FTE)
- Grades: 6-12
- Enrollment: 139 (2024-2025)
- Student to teacher ratio: 5.67
- Colors: Red & gold
- Athletics conference: Northern Nevada Division IV
- Mascot: Warriors
- Website: whs.dcsd.net

George Whittell High School is located in Zephyr Cove, Nevada, near the South Shore of Lake Tahoe. As of 2021, the school housed grades 6 through 12. The school is named after late millionaire George Whittell, Jr. who purchased the Nevada side of Lake Tahoe for his mansion, the Thunderbird Lodge and donated land to the University of Nevada, Reno and the CDP of Zephyr Cove.

The school has been named the best non-charter high school in Nevada by U.S. News & World Report in 2020, and ranked ninth best high school in Nevada overall. In 2017, U.S. News & World Report ranked George Whittell the 12th best high school in Nevada.

== Athletics ==
The athletics program at Whittell is known as the Warriors and competes in Northern Nevada Division IV. The school's main athletic rival is Virginia City High School. The school is known for its boys basketball team who have won 2 state championships in 4 years.

=== Nevada Interscholastic Activities Association State Championships ===
- Baseball - 1979, 2001, 2010, 2015 (runner up)
- Cross Country (Boys) - 1973, 1974, 1977, 1978, 1979, 1980, 2005
- Volleyball (Girls) - 2000, 2003, 2004, 2005, 2006, 2007, 2008
- Golf (Boys) - 2001, 2007, 2008, 2009, 2010, 2012
- Basketball (Boys) - 2014, 2016
- Soccer (Boys) - 1990
- Soccer (Girls) - 2014, 2015

== Notable alumni ==
- Mike Crawford - former American football player
