= Zephyr Cove–Round Hill Village, Nevada =

- Former CDP
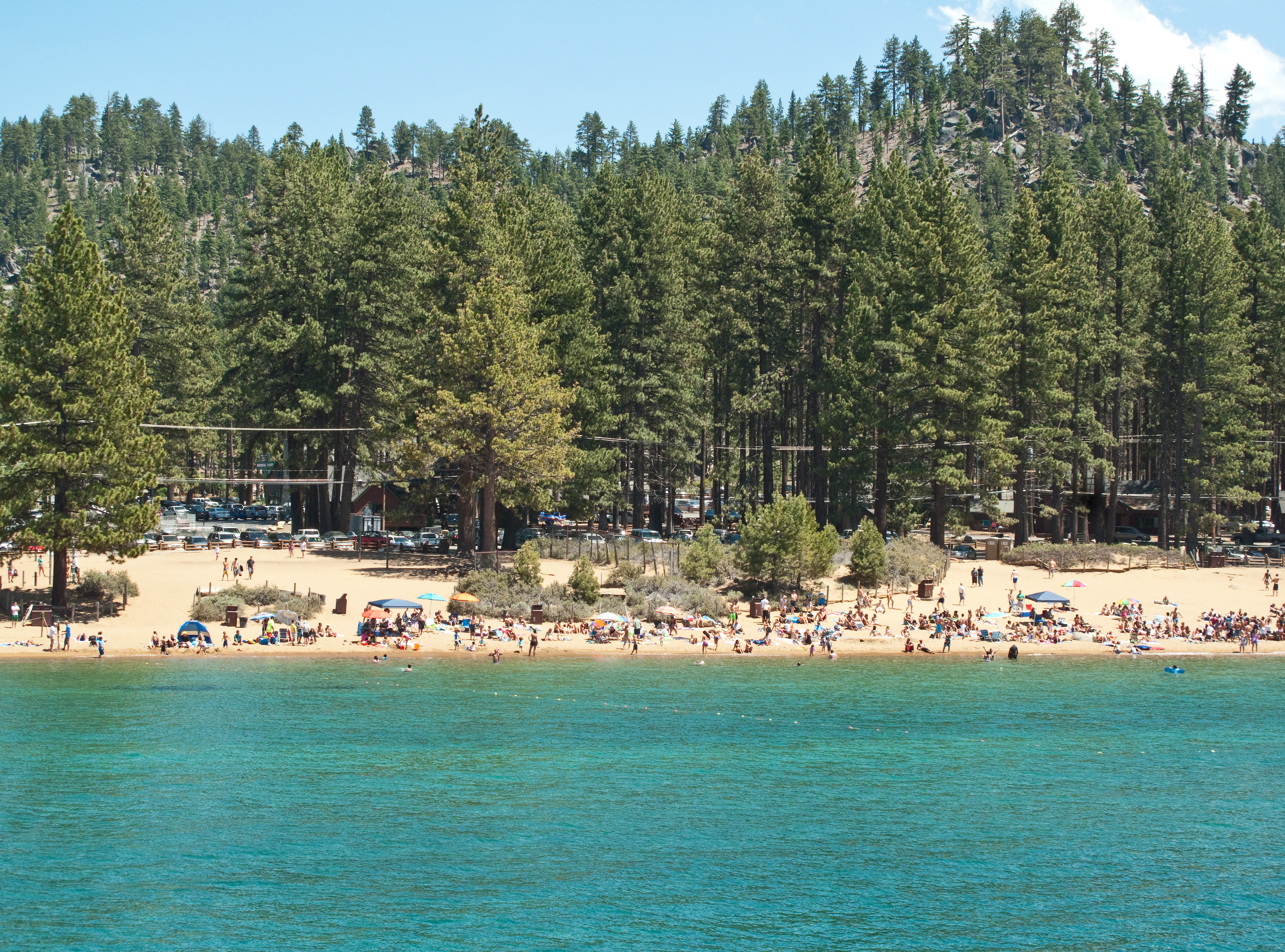
- The beach at Zephyr Cove

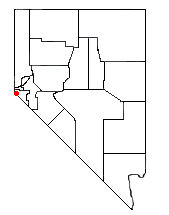
- Location of Zephyr Cove–Round Hill Village, Nevada
- Coordinates: 38°59′52″N 119°56′45″W
- Country: United States
- State: Nevada

Area
  - Total: 8.2 sq mi (21.2 km^{2})
  - Land: 7.9 sq mi (20.5 km^{2})
  - Water: 0.27 sq mi (0.7 km^{2})

Population (2000)
  - Total: 1,649
  - Density: 208/sq mi (80.4/km^{2})
- Time zone: UTC-8 (Pacific (PST))
  - Summer (DST): UTC-7 (PDT)
- FIPS code: 32-86300

Zephyr Cove–Round Hill Village is a former census-designated place (CDP) in Douglas County, Nevada, United States. The population was 1,649 at the 2000 census. For the 2010 census, the area was split into the Zephyr Cove and Round Hill Village CDPs.

== Geography ==
The Zephyr Cove–Round Hill Village CDP was located at 38°59′52″N 119°56′45″W (38.997854, -119.945933).

According to the United States Census Bureau, the CDP had a total area of 8.2 square miles (21.2 km^{2}), of which 7.9 square miles (20.5 km^{2}) was land and 0.27 square miles (0.7 km^{2}), or 3.17%, was water.

== Demographics ==
As of the census of 2000, there were 1,649 people, 798 households, and 466 families residing in the CDP. The population density was 207.8 inhabitants per square mile (80.2/km^{2}). There were 1,426 housing units at an average density of 179.7 per square mile (69.4/km^{2}). The racial makeup of the CDP was 93.9% White, 0.5% African American, 0.7% Native American, 1.6% Asian, 0.3% Pacific Islander, 1.2% from other races, and 1.9% from two or more races. Hispanic or Latino of any race were 3.9% of the population.

There were 798 households, out of which 18.2% had children under the age of 18, 48.1% were married couples living together, 6.8% had a female householder with no husband present, and 41.6% were non-families. 31.7% of all households were made up of individuals, and 6.1% had someone living alone who was 65 years of age or older. The average household size was 2.07 and the average family size was 2.51.

In the CDP, the population was spread out, with 14.8% under the age of 18, 3.7% from 18 to 24, 26.0% from 25 to 44, 40.0% from 45 to 64, and 15.5% who were 65 years of age or older. The median age was 48 years. For every 100 females there were 113.9 males. For every 100 females age 18 and over, there were 112.9 males.

The median income for a household in the CDP was $60,851, and the median income for a family was $64,044. Males had a median income of $38,056 versus $25,284 for females. The per capita income for the CDP was $37,218. About 2.9% of families and 3.3% of the population were below the poverty line, including none of those under age 18 and 3.1% of those age 65 or over.
