= Centerville, Nevada =

Human settlement in the United States

Coordinates: 38°54′38″N 119°46′46″W

Centerville is an unincorporated community in Douglas County, in the U.S. state of Nevada. The community is at the intersection of Nevada routes 88 and 756 approximately two miles south-southwest of Minden.

== History ==
Centerville was named from its central location in the surrounding valley.
