= Genoa, Nevada =

Unincorporated town in the State of Nevada, United States

- Unincorporated town
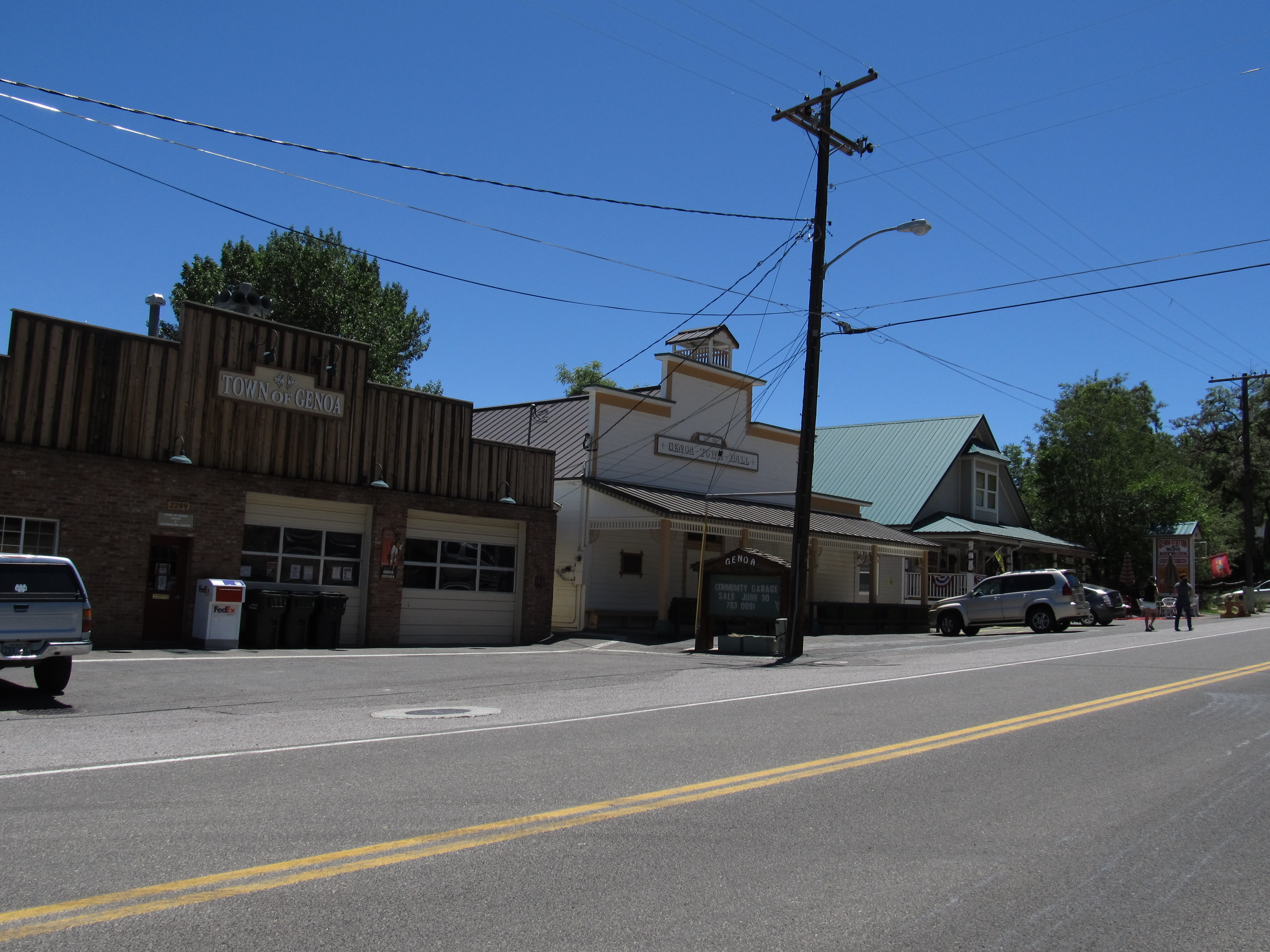

- Location within Nevada
- Coordinates: 39°00′16″N 119°50′50″W
- Country: United States
- State: Nevada
- County: Douglas

Area
  - Total: 9.19 sq mi (23.79 km^{2})
  - Land: 9.19 sq mi (23.79 km^{2})
  - Water: 0 sq mi (0.00 km^{2})
- Elevation: 4,807 ft (1,465 m)

Population (2020)
  - Total: 1,343
  - Density: 146.2/sq mi (56.44/km^{2})
- Time zone: UTC-8 (Pacific (PST))
  - Summer (DST): UTC-7 (PDT)
- ZIP code: 89411
- Area code: 775
- GNIS feature ID: 859807

Genoa (/dʒəˈnoʊ.ə/ jə-NOH-ə) is an unincorporated town in Douglas County, Nevada, United States. Founded in 1851, it was the first settlement in what became the Nevada Territory (1861–1864). It is situated within Carson River Valley and is approximately 42 miles (68 km) south of Reno and seven miles north of Minden, Nevada. The population was 939 at the 2010 census. The town is home to the state's oldest bar, which opened in 1853.

== History ==
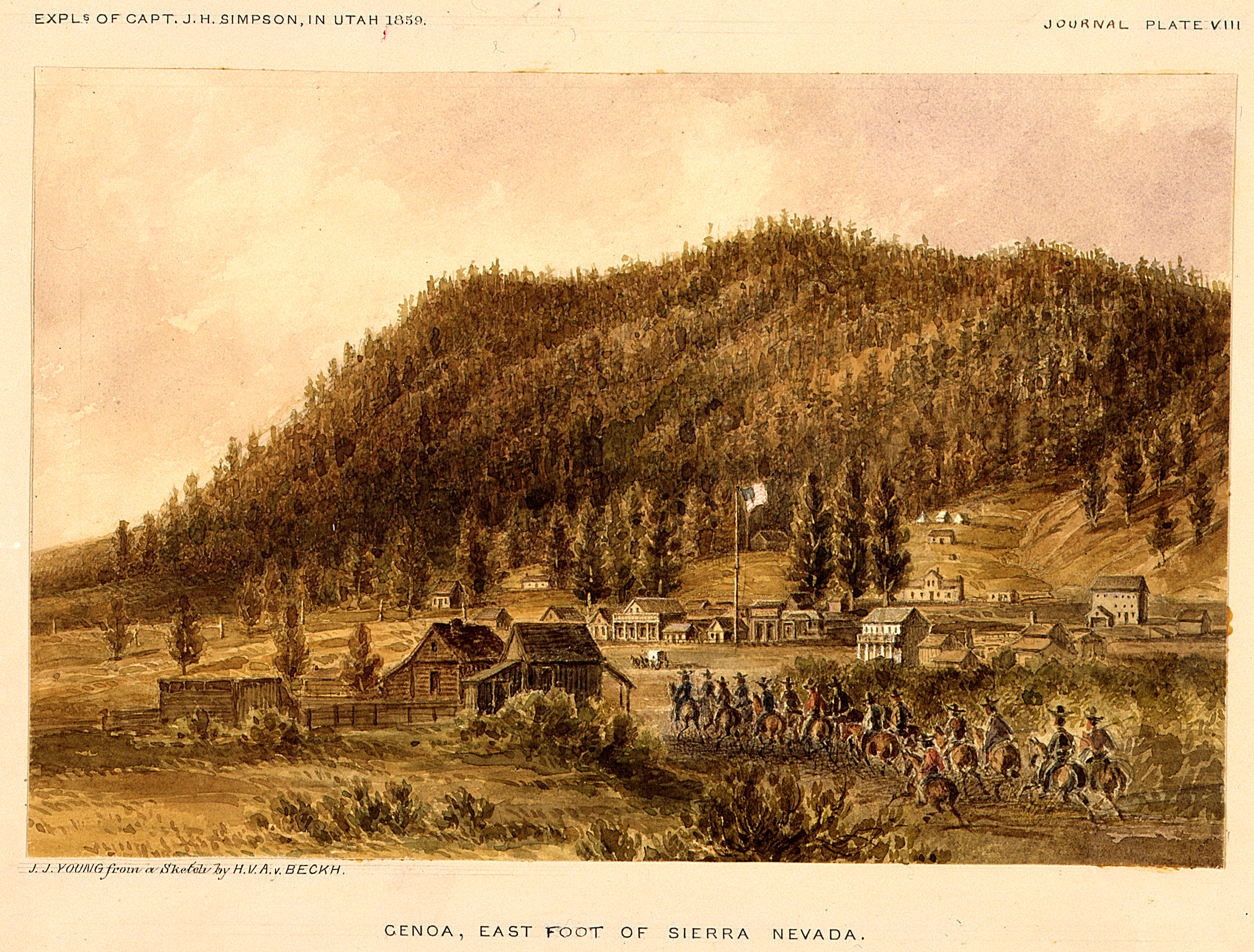
Simpson expedition, Genoa, Nevada, 1859

Genoa was first settled by Mormon pioneers in what was then the Mexican territory of Alta California. The settlement originated as a trading post called Mormon Station, which served as a respite for travelers on the Carson Route of the California Trail. In June 1850, following the 1849 Mexican Cession of territories in what is now Southwestern United States, after the Mexican-American War (1846–1848) H.S. Beatie and fellow Mormons built a roofless log enclosure and corral as a trading post near a small stream. Migrants could obtain clothing, tobacco, meat, canned goods, coffee, beans, sugar, flour, and bacon. The post was abandoned later that year. By 1851, John Reese arrived in the area with horses, cattle, and a dozen wagons loaded with supplies to establish a permanent trading post. By another year later in 1852, migrant traffic through the area was heavy and the settlement expanded. A post office opened, a blacksmith shop was built, and sawmills were built. In 1856, Orson Hyde changed the name of the community to Genoa, after the historic major Italian city.

The original Mormon settlers withdrew in 1857, when they were recalled by the Mormon patriarch and head of The Church of Jesus Christ of Latter-day Saints and first territorial Governor of the Utah Territory (1850–1896), Brigham Young (1801–1877), in the territorial capital of Salt Lake City because of the Utah War (1857–1858). The village of Genoa served temporarily as the first capital city of the new federal Nevada Territory when it was organized on authority of the United States Congress and President of the United States in 1861, until it was moved later that year to Carson City.

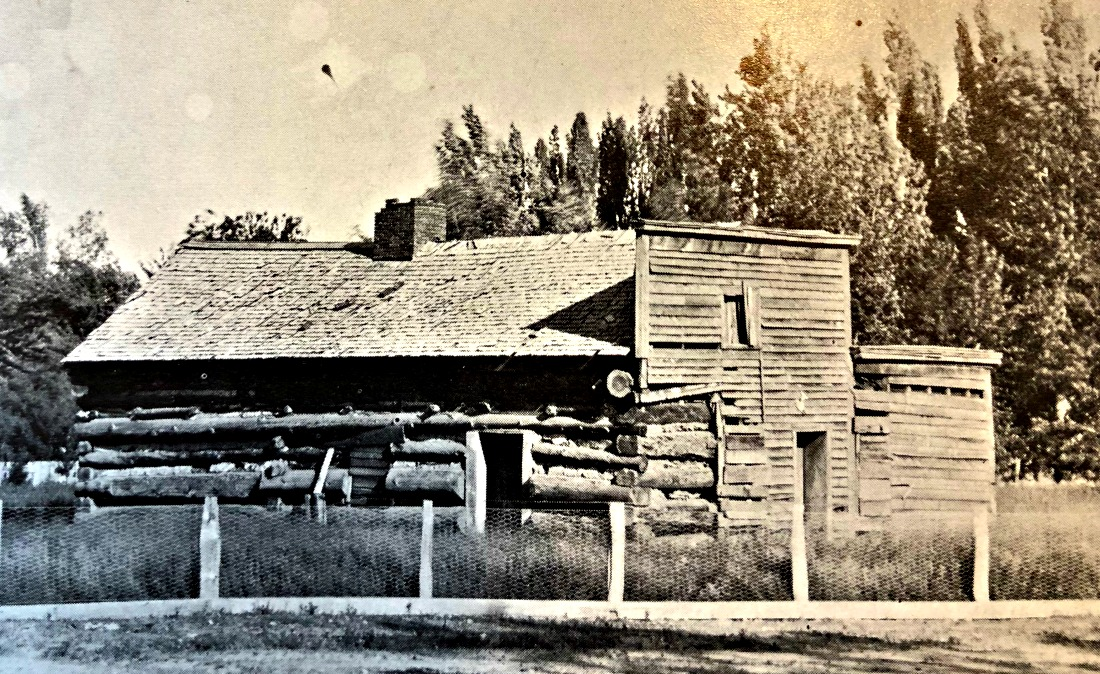
Nevada's first permanent building, Genoa trading post, established 1850

Nevada Territory's first newspaper, the Territorial Enterprise, was founded first in Genoa in 1858 but moved to the boom town of Virginia City two years later in 1860, the year after the silver strikes of the Comstock Lode and rush of men to the diggings and mine shafts. It was also the site in animal husbandry of the first cattle ranch in Nevada.

In 1860, the community became a stop along the Pony Express. In 1861, when the first nine counties of Nevada Territory were created, Genoa became the county seat of Douglas County.

Much of Genoa, including the original fort, station, and hotel, was destroyed in a fire in 1910, but a replica of the fort was built in 1947. Every year since 1919, Genoa has held a festival called the Candy Dance, where candy, food, and crafts are sold to support its town government. The Candy Dance is usually held during the final weekend of September. Many pioneers rest in the Genoa graveyard, including Snowshoe Thompson, his wife and his son.

A mile south of Genoa is David Walley's Resort, a famous natural hot springs and spa. It was first built in 1862 and known as Walley's Hot Springs.

On October 1, 1934, the infamous wanted criminal and bank robber Baby Face Nelson (1908–1934, born Lester Joseph Gillis, later also known as George ("Baby Face") Nelson), and members of his criminal gang arrived at Walley's Hot Springs and hid out for a month before returning east to Chicago, where Nelson was later shot by agents of the Federal Bureau of Investigation (FBI) from the Chicago field office and Washington, D.C., headquarters, under famous long-serving Director J. Edgar Hoover (1895–1972, served 1924-1935 / 1935–1972), in the United States Department of Justice.

== In popular culture ==
Scenes from the 1973 movie Charley Varrick were filmed in Genoa, and the village was the set for the 1990 movie Misery, starring Kathy Bates, when the village doubled in size with buildings added and then removed after the filming. Food writer M. F. K. Fisher wrote a series of cookbook reviews for The New Yorker from her sister's home in Genoa during the 1960s.

== Genoa Historic District ==
- Genoa Historic District
- U.S. National Register of Historic Places
- U.S. Historic district
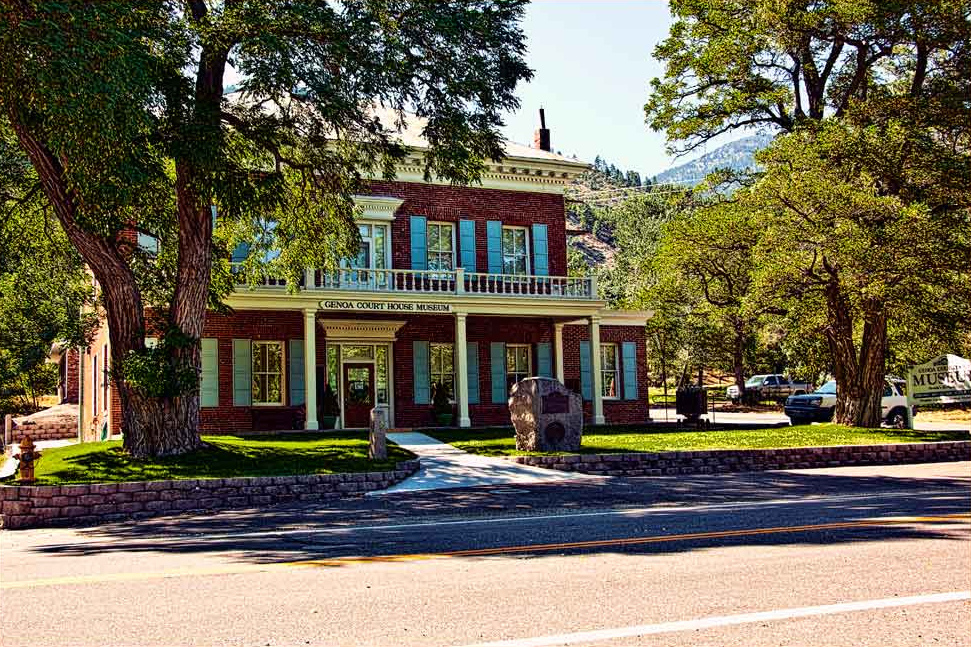
- Genoa Courthouse Museum
- Nearest city: Minden, Nevada
- Coordinates: 39°0′N 119°51′W
- Area: 129.5 acres (52.4 ha)
- Architectural style: Late Victorian
- NRHP reference No.: 75001108
- Added to NRHP: April 16, 1975

The Genoa Historic District is a portion of the community of Genoa which, as a 129.5-acre (52.4 ha) historic district was listed on the U.S. National Register of Historic Places in 1975. Historically known as Mormon Station, the historic area includes Late Victorian architecture. It includes a courthouse and city hall among 29 contributing buildings.

== Geography ==
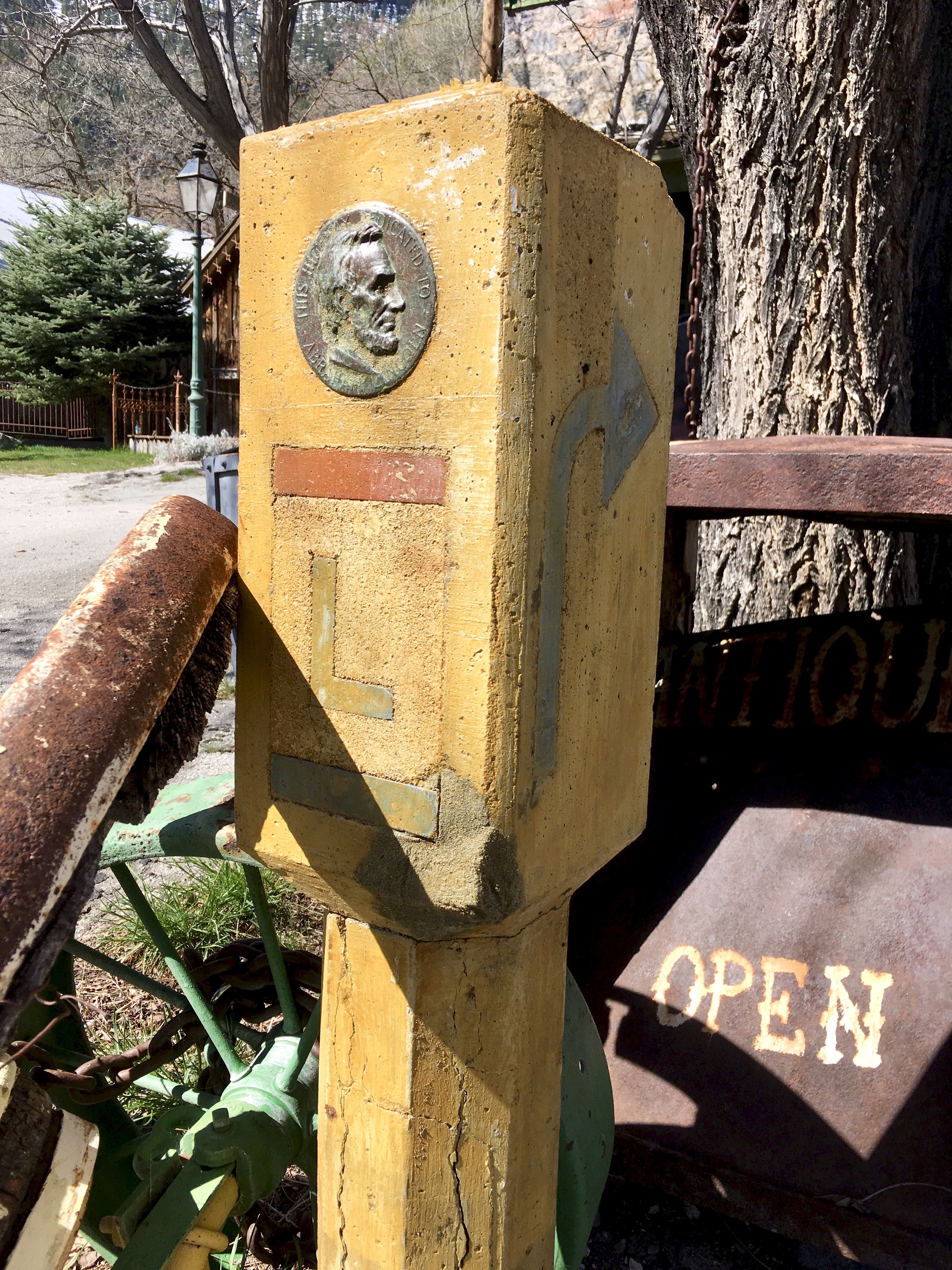
Road Marker on the main road in Genoa, Nevada

Genoa is located on the western edge of the Carson Valley, 7 miles (11 km) northwest of Minden, the Douglas County seat. Nevada State Route 206 enters Genoa from the south as Foothill Road, then turns east in the center of town onto Genoa Lane. According to the United States Census Bureau, the census-designated place of Genoa has a total area of 9.2 square miles (23.8 km^{2}), all land.

=== Climate ===
The area has a Köppen Climate Classification of Csb, which is a warm-summer Mediterranean climate.

Climate data for Genoa, Nevada
Month	Jan	Feb	Mar	Apr	May	Jun	Jul	Aug	Sep	Oct	Nov	Dec	Year
Mean daily maximum °F (°C)	37 (3)	38 (3)	44 (7)	49 (9)	58 (14)	67 (19)	76 (24)	75 (24)	68 (20)	57 (14)	45 (7)	37 (3)	54 (12)
Mean daily minimum °F (°C)	21 (−6)	21 (−6)	24 (−4)	28 (−2)	34 (1)	41 (5)	48 (9)	47 (8)	42 (6)	35 (2)	26 (−3)	21 (−6)	32 (0)
Average precipitation inches (mm)	3.6 (91)	3.4 (86)	2.9 (74)	1.4 (36)	1 (25)	0.7 (18)	0.2 (5.1)	0.6 (15)	0.6 (15)	1.2 (30)	1.6 (41)	3.5 (89)	20.8 (530)
Source: Weatherbase

== Demographics ==
Historical population
Census	Pop.	Note	%±
2020	1,343		—
U.S. Decennial Census

== See also ==
- Mormon Station State Historic Park
