= Zephyr Cove, Nevada =

- Census-designated place
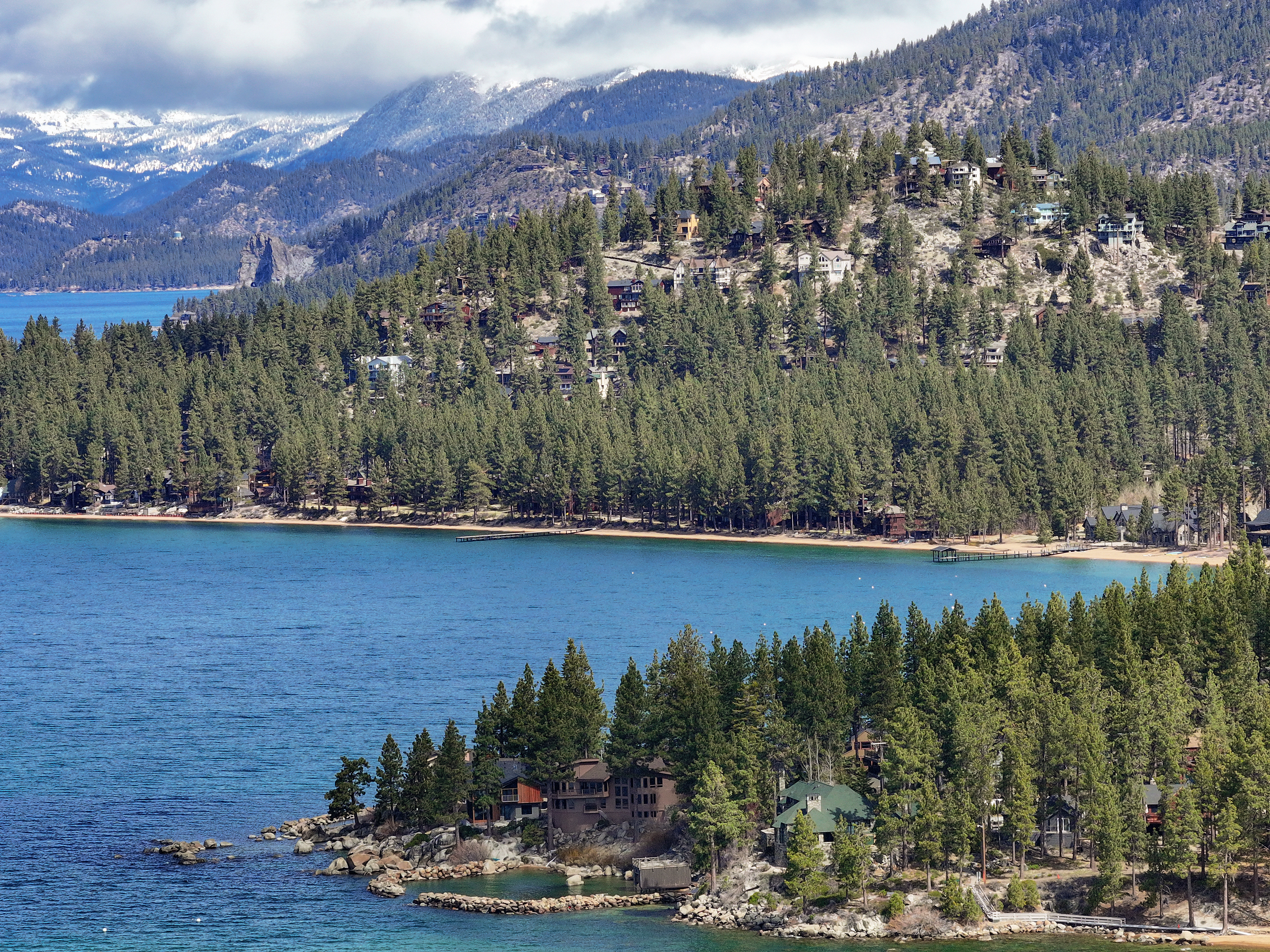
- View from the South

- Location of Zephyr Cove, Nevada
- Coordinates: 39°0′1″N 119°57′9″W
- Country: United States
- State: Nevada

Area
  - Total: 2.24 sq mi (5.81 km^{2})
  - Land: 2.12 sq mi (5.50 km^{2})
  - Water: 0.12 sq mi (0.32 km^{2})
- Elevation: 6,752 ft (2,058 m)

Population (2020)
  - Total: 679
  - Density: 320.0/sq mi (123.54/km^{2})
- Time zone: UTC−8 (Pacific (PST))
  - Summer (DST): UTC−7 (PDT)
- ZIP Code: 89448
- Area code: 775
- FIPS code: 32-86200
- GNIS feature ID: 2652368

Zephyr Cove is a community and census-designated place (CDP) in Douglas County, Nevada, United States. As of the 2020 census, Zephyr Cove had a population of 679. Prior to 2010 it was part of the Zephyr Cove–Round Hill Village CDP.

== History ==
Before Zephyr Cove was established, the Native American Washoe people lived around the area. The first Anglo-American settlers to encounter the area were Kit Carson and John Fremont in 1844.

In 1862, Anglo-Americans settled around the community. They named the community Zephyr Cove, which was named after the Washoe Zephyr.

A post office called Zephyr Cove has been in operation since 1930. The name of the post office popularized the term and it soon became the name of the community.

On March 1, 1964, Paradise Airlines Flight 901A crashed near Zephyr Cove, killing all 85 people aboard.

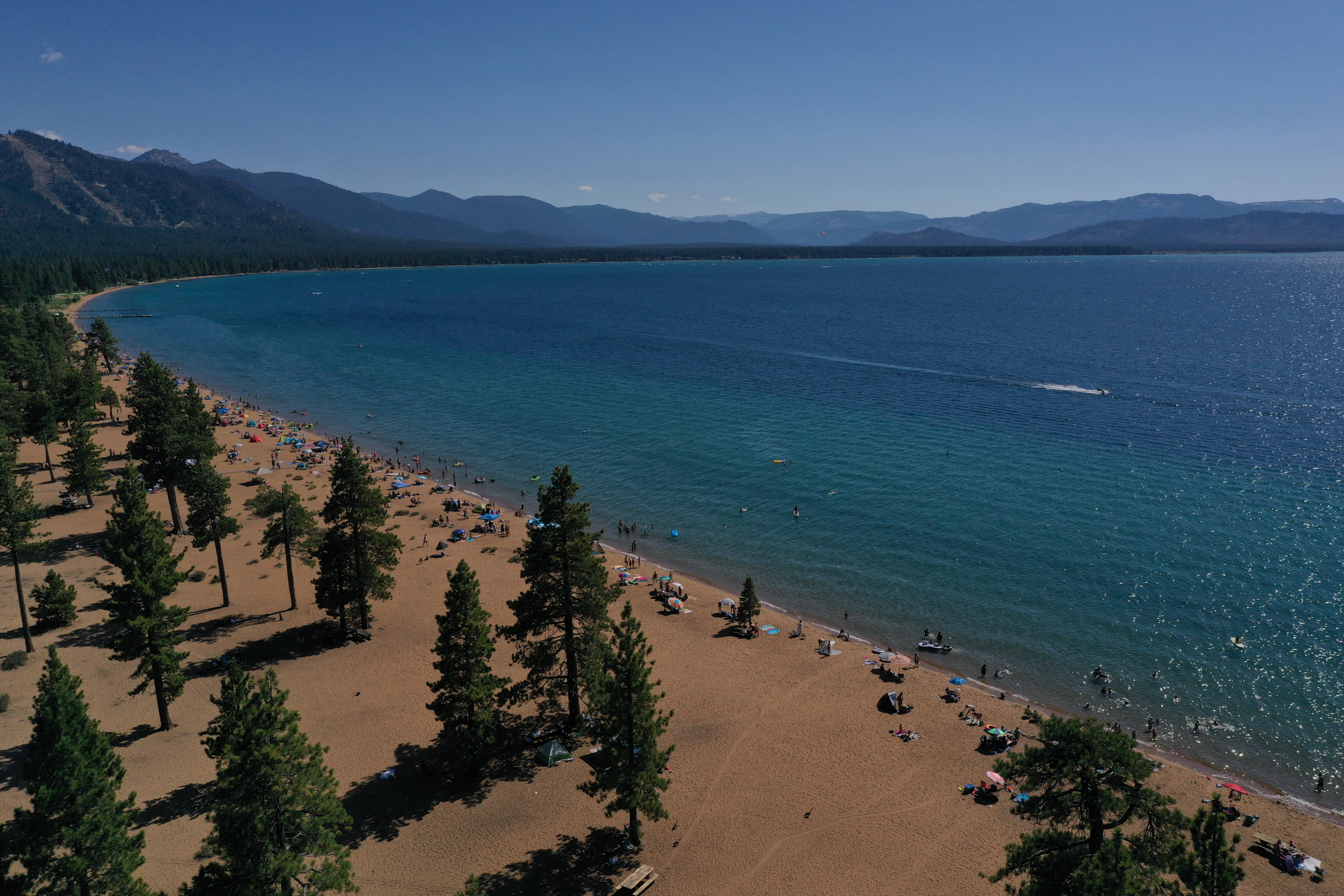
Nevada Beach Campground in Zephyr Cove

== Geography ==
Zephyr Cove is located on the east shore of Lake Tahoe at 39°0′1″N 119°57′9″W. According to the United States Census Bureau, the CDP has a total area of 2.2 square miles (5.8 km^{2}), of which 2.1 square miles (5.5 km^{2}) is land and 0.12 square miles (0.3 km^{2}), or 5.47%, is water.

== Education ==
Kingsbury Middle School was a grade 6–8 middle school located in Zephyr Cove, part of the Douglas County School District. Due to the declining student population in the area, the school closed in 2008 with the property being offered for sale in 2012.

Zephyr Cove Elementary School and George Whittell High School absorbed the student population from Kingsbury Middle School.

Zephyr Cove has a public library, a branch of the Douglas County Public Library.

== Demographics ==
Historical population
Census	Pop.	Note	%±
2010	565		—
2020	679		20.2%
U.S. Decennial Census
