= Kingsbury, Nevada =

- CDP
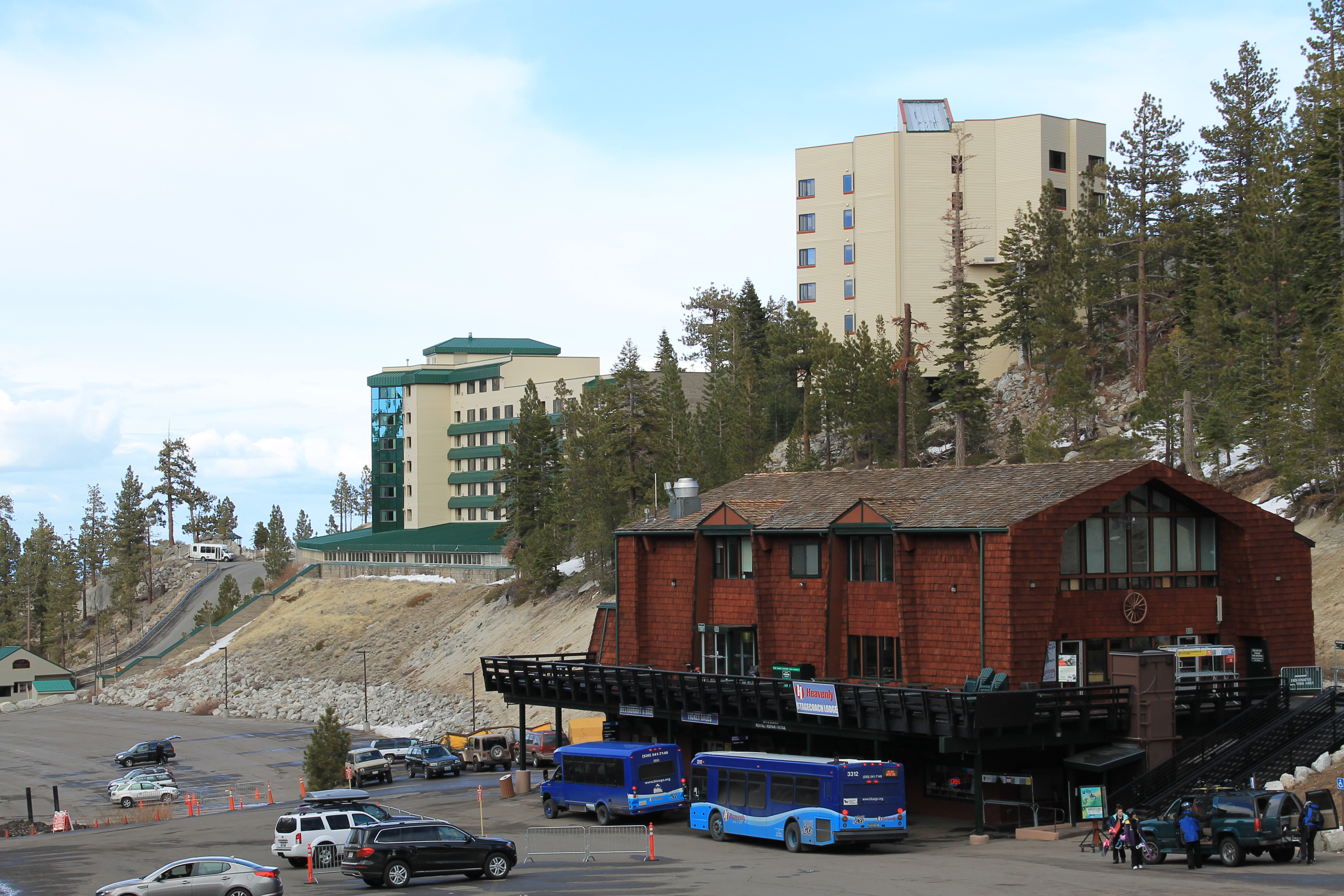

- Location of Kingsbury, Nevada
- Coordinates: 38°58′24″N 119°54′10″W
- Country: United States
- State: Nevada

Area
  - Total: 21.81 sq mi (56.49 km^{2})
  - Land: 21.81 sq mi (56.49 km^{2})
  - Water: 0 sq mi (0.00 km^{2})
- Elevation: 7,218 ft (2,200 m)

Population (2020)
  - Total: 2,313
  - Density: 106.1/sq mi (40.95/km^{2})
- Time zone: UTC-8 (Pacific (PST))
  - Summer (DST): UTC-7 (PDT)
- ZIP code: 89448
- Area code: 775
- FIPS code: 32-38000
- GNIS feature ID: 0847765

Kingsbury is a census-designated place (CDP) in Douglas County, Nevada, United States. As of the 2020 census, Kingsbury had a population of 2,313.

== Geography ==
Kingsbury is located at 38°58′24″N 119°54′10″W (38.973450, -119.902674).

According to the United States Census Bureau, the CDP has a total area of 21.8 square miles (56 km^{2}), all of it land.

== Climate ==
Kingsbury has a humid continental climate (Dfb). Summers are typically mild – warm and dry, with very cool nights. Winters are some of the coldest in the state, with highs in the 30s and lows around 20. Annual snowfall is very heavy, averaging 120 inches (300 cm). The record high temperature recorded occurred on July 10, 2002, and July 20, 2013, and is 91 °F (33 °C). The recorded temperature recorded occurred on February 5 and 8, 1989, and is −14 °F (−26 °C). The highest minimum recorded occurred on July 31, 2015, and is 69 °F (21 °C). The lowest maximum recorded occurred on January 13, 2002, and is 0 °F (−18 °C). The average first and last snowfalls occur on September 17 and June 15. The average snow depth of at least an inch lasts from November 17 to April 28. The average first and last freeze dates are September 20 and June 13, giving Kingsbury an average growing season of 109 days. The average first and last dates of a warm 75 °F (24 °C) temperature are June 3 and September 18. The highest single-day snowfall is 36 inches (91 cm) and occurred on December 21, 1996. The highest recorded snowpack is 94 inches (240 cm) and occurred on February 22 and 23, 2017. Kingsbury is one of the wettest towns in the state of Nevada.

Climate data for Daggett Pass
Month	Jan	Feb	Mar	Apr	May	Jun	Jul	Aug	Sep	Oct	Nov	Dec	Year
Record high °F (°C)	56 (13)	59 (15)	65 (18)	72 (22)	80 (27)	86 (30)	91 (33)	87 (31)	84 (29)	76 (24)	70 (21)	56 (13)	91 (33)
Mean daily maximum °F (°C)	36.9 (2.7)	38.7 (3.7)	43.3 (6.3)	49.7 (9.8)	57.9 (14.4)	68.3 (20.2)	75.7 (24.3)	74.6 (23.7)	67.8 (19.9)	57.1 (13.9)	44.4 (6.9)	36.7 (2.6)	54.3 (12.4)
Daily mean °F (°C)	28.9 (−1.7)	29.9 (−1.2)	33.9 (1.1)	38.5 (3.6)	45.8 (7.7)	54.5 (12.5)	61.7 (16.5)	60.6 (15.9)	54.7 (12.6)	45.7 (7.6)	35.2 (1.8)	28.8 (−1.8)	43.2 (6.2)
Mean daily minimum °F (°C)	20.8 (−6.2)	21.1 (−6.1)	24.4 (−4.2)	27.4 (−2.6)	33.7 (0.9)	40.6 (4.8)	47.7 (8.7)	46.7 (8.2)	41.6 (5.3)	34.2 (1.2)	26 (−3)	20.9 (−6.2)	32.1 (0.1)
Record low °F (°C)	−6 (−21)	−14 (−26)	2 (−17)	10 (−12)	13 (−11)	22 (−6)	28 (−2)	32 (0)	20 (−7)	13 (−11)	3 (−16)	−3 (−19)	−14 (−26)
Average precipitation inches (mm)	3.55 (90)	2.87 (73)	3.92 (100)	1.24 (31)	1.14 (29)	0.63 (16)	0.30 (7.6)	0.46 (12)	0.79 (20)	1.11 (28)	2.88 (73)	4.85 (123)	23.74 (602.6)
Average snowfall inches (cm)	26.1 (66)	23.2 (59)	21.7 (55)	7.2 (18)	1.3 (3.3)	0.4 (1.0)	0 (0)	0 (0)	trace	1.9 (4.8)	11.2 (28)	26.9 (68)	119.9 (303.1)

== Demographics ==
Historical population
Census	Pop.	Note	%±
2010	2,152		—
2020	2,313		7.5%
U.S. Decennial Census

=== 2020 census ===
As of the 2020 census, Kingsbury had a population of 2,313. The median age was 50.7 years. 11.8% of residents were under the age of 18 and 23.8% of residents were 65 years of age or older. For every 100 females there were 129.7 males, and for every 100 females age 18 and over there were 130.1 males age 18 and over.

78.9% of residents lived in urban areas, while 21.1% lived in rural areas.

There were 1,142 households in Kingsbury, of which 15.6% had children under the age of 18 living in them. Of all households, 45.0% were married-couple households, 30.6% were households with a male householder and no spouse or partner present, and 16.4% were households with a female householder and no spouse or partner present. About 34.0% of all households were made up of individuals and 12.7% had someone living alone who was 65 years of age or older.

There were 1,824 housing units, of which 37.4% were vacant. The homeowner vacancy rate was 3.4% and the rental vacancy rate was 12.8%.

Racial composition as of the 2020 census
Race	Number	Percent
White	1,971	85.2%
Black or African American	12	0.5%
American Indian and Alaska Native	18	0.8%
Asian	50	2.2%
Native Hawaiian and Other Pacific Islander	2	0.1%
Some other race	49	2.1%
Two or more races	211	9.1%
Hispanic or Latino (of any race)	222	9.6%

=== 2000 census ===
As of the census of 2000, there were 2,624 people, 1,176 households, and 684 families residing in the CDP. The population density was 120.3 inhabitants per square mile (46.4/km^{2}). There were 1,925 housing units at an average density of 88.3 per square mile (34.1/km^{2}). The racial makeup of the CDP was 93.3% White, 0.5% African American, 0.6% Native American, 2.1% Asian, 0.2% Pacific Islander, 1.6% from other races, and 1.7% from two or more races. Hispanic or Latino of any race were 4.2% of the population.

There were 1,176 households, out of which 21.9% had children under the age of 18 living with them, 50.6% were married couples living together, 4.7% had a female householder with no husband present, and 41.8% were non-families. 27.3% of all households were made up of individuals, and 4.3% had someone living alone who was 65 years of age or older. The average household size was 2.23 and the average family size was 2.71.

In the CDP, the population was spread out, with 17.4% under the age of 18, 6.6% from 18 to 24, 32.8% from 25 to 44, 32.4% from 45 to 64, and 10.8% who were 65 years of age or older. The median age was 42 years. For every 100 females, there were 120.3 males. For every 100 females age 18 and over, there were 124.0 males.

The median income for a household in the CDP was $59,511, and the median income for a family was $73,333. Males had a median income of $40,208 versus $31,652 for females. The per capita income for the CDP was $41,451. About 3.0% of families and 4.9% of the population were below the poverty line, including none of those under age 18 and 12.4% of those age 65 or over.

== See also ==
- List of census-designated places in Nevada
