= 2026 World Series of Poker Circuit =

WSOP Circuit is a Series of poker tournaments around the world

2026 WSOP Circuit
- League: World Series of Poker Circuit
- Sport: Texas Hold 'em
- Duration: January 8-December, 2026
- Streaming partner: YouTube WSOP

WSOPC seasons
- ← 2025 2027 →

The 2026 World Series of Poker Circuit was the 23rd annual World Series of Poker Circuit.

== Event schedule ==
Source: The Hendom Mob: World Series of Poker Circuit season 2026

=== (United States) WSOP Circuit Planet Hollywood Las Vegas - Nevada (Ring Event) ===
- Venue: Planet Hollywood Las Vegas
- Full Event Dates: January 1-12, 2026
- Number of Entries: 616
- Buy-in: $1,700 ($1,515 + $185)
- Guaranteed Prize Pool: $750,000
- Total Prize Pool: $933,240
- Number of Payouts: 93

Final Table
Place	Name	Prize
1st	(United States) Darren Rabinowitz	$175,430
2nd	(United States) David Dibernardi	$116,917
3rd	(United States) Kayla Clackum	$81,321
4th	(Japan) Katsumoto Sakaguchi	$57,545
5th	(United States) Drake Kemper	$41,439
6th	(United States) Jacob Mendelsohn	$30,378
7th	(United States) Yuanzhi Cao	$22,678
8th	(United States) Victoria Livschitz	$17,245
9th	(United States) Alan Merdita	$13,363

=== WSOP International Circuit King's Resort Rozvadov - (Czech Republic) (Ring Event) ===
- Venue: King's Casino
- Full Event Dates: January 1-13, 2026
- Number of Entries: 692
- Buy-in: €1,500
- Guaranteed Prize Pool:€1,000,000
- Total Prize Pool: €1,038,000
- Number of Payouts: 107

Final Table
Place	Name	Prize
1st	(Greece) Georgios Vrakas	€164,000
2nd	(Mexico) Jose Casillas	€109,500
3rd	(Switzerland) Yannick Jobin	€74,700
4th	(Czech Republic) Roman Papcek	€52,100
5th	(Moldova) Artiom Poddubnii	€37,100
6th	(Germany) Andreas Staschewski	€26,900
7th	(Czech Republic) Zdeněk Žižka	€19,900
8th	(Romania) Andrei Birgaoanu	€15,000
9th	(Ukraine) Rostyslav Sabishchenko	€11,600

=== (United States) WSOP Circuit Choctaw Durant - Oklahoma ===
- Venue: Choctaw Casinos Durant
- Full Event Dates:January 07-19, 2026
- Number of Entries: 922
- Buy-in: $1,700 ($1,515 + $185)
- Total Prize Pool: $1,396,830
- Number of Payouts: 135

Final Table
Place	Name	Prize
1st	(United States) Winston Djonli	$232,680
2nd	(United States) Matthew Barnett	$155,010
3rd	(United States) Venkat N.C. Nagabhairava	$107,360
4th	(United States) Unknown Player	$75,700
5th	(United States) Kenneth Lemer	$54,360
6th	(United States) Dustin Schoonover	$39,770
7th	(United States) Jeremy Kennon	$29,650
8th	(United States) Todd Tucker	$22,540
9th	(United States) Alejandro Jaureguireynoso	$17,470

=== WSOP International Circuit Deerfoot Inn & Casino Calgary - (Canada) (Ring Event) ===
- Venue: Deerfoot Calgary
- Full Event Dates: January 07-19, 2026
- Number of Entries: 1,321
- Buy-in: CA$2,200 (~$1,583)
- Total Prize Pool: CA$2,575,796 (~$1,852,784)
- Number of Payouts: 196

Final Table
Place	Name	Prize (Original)	Prize (U$D)
1st	(Canada) Senthuran Vijayaratnam	CA$396,556	$285,245
2nd	(Canada) Robin Bergren	CA$264,283	$190,100
3rd	(Canada) Graham Lupton	CA$188,206	$135,378
4th	(Bosnia and Herzegovina) Alen Bakovic	CA$135,855	$97,721
5th	(Canada) Weston Pring	CA$99,420	$71,513
6th	(Canada) Rishi Makkar	CA$73,776	$53,067
7th	(China) Jiajie Sheng	CA$55,524	$39,939
8th	(United States) David Quang	CA$42,390	$30,491
9th	(Canada) Nizar Tajdin	CA$32,835	$23,618

=== (United States) WSOP Circuit Thunder Valley Lincoln - California (Ring Event) ===
- Venue: Thunder Valley Casino Resort
- Full Event Dates:January 15-26, 2026
- Number of Entries: 764
- Buy-in: $1,700 ($1,515 + $185)
- Total Prize Pool: $1,157,460
- Number of Payouts: 116

Final Table
Place	Name	Prize
1st	(United States) Jaime Haletky	$205,460
2nd	(United States) Franklin Chavez	$136,920
3rd	(United States) Casey Sandretto	$95,650
4th	(Philippines) Julius Roque	$67,920
5th	(United States) Donald Landwirth	$49,040
6th	(United States) Stephen Kujubu	$36,020
7th	(United States) Unknown Player	$26,920
8th	(Russia) Roman Dorokhin	$20,470
9th	(United States) Spencer Gore	$15,850

=== WSOP International Circuit Marrakesh - (Morocco) (Ring Event) ===
- Venue: Es Saadi Gardens & Resort Marrakesh
- Full Event Dates: January 16-25, 2026
- Number of Entries: 1,694
- Buy-in: 16,000درهم
- Buy-in (USD): $1,743)
- Total Prize Pool: 23,039,000درهم
- Total Prize Pool (USD): $2,510,332
- Number of Payouts: 255

Final Table
Place	Name	Prize (Original)	Prize (U$D)
1st	(Switzerland) Sandro Carucci	3,000,000درهم	$326,880
2nd	(France) Malcom Franchi	2,300,000درهم	$250,608
3rd	(Republic of Ireland) Turlough McHugh	1,700,000درهم	$185,232
4th	(Spain) Raul	1,285,000درهم	$140,014
5th	(France) Salim Sefiat	940,000درهم	$102,423
6th	(Spain) Aitor Cruz	700,000درهم	$76,272
7th	(France) Alexandre Bermon	515,000درهم	$56,114
8th	(Switzerland) Luc Ramos	385,000درهم	$41,950
9th	(Morocco) Mehdi Chaoui	300,000درهم	$32,688

=== (United States) WSOP Circuit Horseshoe Tunica - Mississippi (Ring Event) ===
- Venue: Horseshoe Casino Tunica
- Full Event Dates: January 22-February 2, 2026
- Number of Entries: 433
- Buy-in: $1,700 ($1,515 + $185)
- Guaranteed Prize Pool: $500,000
- Total Prize Pool: $655,995
- Number of Payouts: 63

Final Table
Place	Name	Prize
1st	(United States) David Yount	$132,570
2nd	(United States) Dustin Murphy	$88,105
3rd	(United States) Donovan Dean	$59,830
4th	(United States) David Moses	$41,527
5th	(United States) Danny Griffith	$29,475
6th	(United States) Marcus Paxton	$21,404
7th	(United States) Sokchheka Pho	$15,911
8th	(United States) Jared Ingles	$15,539
9th	(United States) Luther Tran	$9,454

=== (United States) WSOP Circuit Harrah's Pompano Beach - Florida (Ring Event) ===
- Venue: Harrah's Pompano Beach
- Full Event Dates: January 29-February 9, 2026
- Number of Entries: 925
- Buy-in: $1,700 ($1,515 + $185)
- Guaranteed Prize Pool: $500,000
- Total Prize Pool: $1,404,150
- Number of Payouts: 134

Final Table
Place	Name	Prize
1st	(Canada) Zachary Fischer	$233,384
2nd	(United States) Nicholas Blumenthal	$155,559
3rd	(United States) Elliott Kampen	$111,994
4th	(United States) Matthew Lambrecht	$77,028
5th	(Japan) Caio Sobral	$55,588
6th	(United States) Jeffery Schneider	$40,811
7th	(United States) Mukul Pahuja	$30,491
8th	(United States) Kayla Clackum	$23,191
9th	(United States) Howard Mash	$17,961

=== (United States) WSOP Circuit Cherokee's - North Carolina (Ring Event) ===
- Venue: Harrah's Cherokee
- Full Event Dates: February 20-23, 2026
- Number of Entries: 1,824
- Buy-in: $1,700 ($1,515 + $185)
- Total Prize Pool: $2,763,360
- Number of Payouts: 269

Final Table
Place	Name	Prize
1st	(United States) Maxwell Guo	$386,231
2nd	(United States) Peter Ng	$257,398
3rd	(United States) Jesse Jones	$184,167
4th	(United States) Toby Boas	$133,478
5th	(United States) Andrew Robinson	$98,011
6th	(United States) Nicholas Rigby	$72,925
7th	(United States) David Walker	$54,991
8th	(United States) David Sathue	$42,034
9th	(United States) Nitis Udornpim	$32,575

=== (United States) WSOP Circuit Baltimore - Maryland (Ring Event) ===
- Venue: Horseshoe Casino Baltimore
- Full Event Dates: February 19-March 2, 2026
- Number of Entries: 413
- Buy-in: $1,700 ($1,515 + $185)
- Total Prize Pool: $625,695
- Number of Payouts: 60

Final Table
Place	Name	Prize
1st	(United States) Christopher Selami	$128,100
2nd	(United States) Manh Nguyen	$84,380
3rd	(United States) Jose Cayetano De La Rosa	$56,904
4th	(United States) Patrick Pettitt	$39,310
5th	(United States) Aaron Gao	$27,834
6th	(United States) Morgan Petro	$20,213
7th	(United States) Christian Harder	$15,065
8th	(United States) Chu-Ming Wu	$11,531
9th	(United States) Barry Remmel	$9,071

=== (United States) WSOP Circuit Hammond - Indiana (Ring Event) ===
- Venue: Horseshoe Hammond
- Full Event Dates: February 26-March 9, 2026
- Number of Entries: 741
- Buy-in: $1,700 ($1,515 + $185)
- Total Prize Pool: $1,122,615
- Number of Payouts:

Final Table
Place	Name	Prize
1st	(United States) Richard Bai	$197,299
2nd	(United States) Cody Brinn	$131,503
3rd	(United States) Charles Cunha	$90,551
4th	(United States) Daniel Lei	$63,554
5th	(Canada) Andrew Fahey	$45,483
6th	(United States) Jeffery Hollar	$33,023
7th	(United States) Varkey James	$24,734
8th	(United States) Kenny Nguyen	$18,811
9th	(United States) Jordan Helstern	$14,611

=== WSOP International Circuit Grand Casino Gamprin - (Liechtenstein) (Ring Event) ===
- Venue: Grand Casino Liechtenstein Gamprin
- Full Event Dates: February 26-March 10, 2026
- Number of Entries: 827
- Buy-in: SFr 1,500 (~$1,922)
- Guaranteed Prize Pool:SFr 1,000,000 (~$1,281,333)
- Total Prize Pool: SFr 1,071,792 (~$1,373,089)
- Number of Payouts: 125

Final Table
Place	Name	Prize
1st	(France) Benjamin Hammann	$243,914
2nd	(Romania) Neculai Macovei	$155,399
3rd	(Switzerland) Angelo Arossi	$108,254
4th	(Germany) Florian Geiger	$77,123
5th	(Portugal) Flynn Meichtry	$55,087
6th	(Italy) Eros Calderone	$39,842
7th	(Austria) Kilian Kramer	$29,593
8th	(Italy) Claudio Di Giacomo	$22,419

=== (United States) WSOP Circuit Tulsa - Oklahoma (Ring Event) ===
- Venue: Hard Rock Hotel & Casino
- Full Event Dates: March 4-16, 2026
- Number of Entries: 478
- Buy-in: $1,700 ($1,515 + $185)
- Total Prize Pool: $724,170
- Number of Payouts: 55

Final Table
Place	Name	Prize
1st	(United States) Robert Shuptrine	$142,758
2nd	(United States) Christopher Stewart	$95,254
3rd	(United States) Christy Cranford	$64,890
4th	(United States) John Reynolds	$45,153
5th	(United States) Antonio Delacruz	$32,110
6th	(United States) Stephen Ticsay	$23,347
7th	(United States) Trey Bartlett	$17,364
8th	(United States) Richard Gordon	$13,219
9th	(United States) William Rowlett	$10,305

=== (United States) WSOP Circuit Verona - New York (Ring Event) ===
- Venue: Turning Stone Resort Casino
- Full Event Dates: March 12-23, 2026
- Number of Entries: 1,114
- Buy-in: $1,700 ($1,515 + $185)
- Total Prize Pool: $1,687,710
- Number of Payouts: 121

Final Table
Place	Name	Prize
1st	(United States) Zachary VanKeuren	$267,437
2nd	(United States) Adam Kurnitz	$178,255
3rd	(United States) Andrew Porter	$124,949
4th	(United States) Autumn Hayes	$88,986
5th	(United States) Charbel Boujaoude	$64,405
6th	(United States) Matthew Schiavi	$47,386
7th	(United States) Michael Bohmerwald	$35,451
8th	(United States) Marisa Hancock	$26,975
9th	(United States) Michael Nye	$20,883

=== WSOP International Circuit Grand Casino Amsterdam - (Netherlands) (Ring Event) ===
- Venue: Holland Casino, Amsterdam City Centre
- Full Event Dates: March 13-21, 2026
- Number of Entries: 881
- Buy-in: €1,500 (~$1,719)
- Guaranteed Prize Pool:€500,000 (~$573,000)
- Total Prize Pool: €1,141,776 (~$1,308,881)
- Number of Payouts: 133

Final Table
Place	Name	Prize
1st	(Portugal) Pedro Moreira Jorge	€201,276
2nd	(Netherlands) Yigal Yifrah	€130,300
3rd	(Netherlands) Mats Veerman	€90,500
4th	(Netherlands) Lennart Beekhuis	€63,900
5th	(Canada) Nohad Teliani	€45,900
6th	(Ukraine) Yurii Senchylo	€33,600
7th	(Japan) Kei Sugita	€25,000
8th	(Netherlands) Wesley Klerx	€18,900

=== (United States) WSOP Circuit Las Vegas - Nevada (Ring Event) ===
- Venue: Horseshoe Las Vegas
- Full Event Dates: March 19-30, 2026
- Number of Entries: 661
- Buy-in: $1,700 ($1,515 + $185)
- Guaranteed Prize Pool: $500,000
- Total Prize Pool: $1,001,415
- Number of Payouts: 102

Final Table
Place	Name	Prize
1st	(Venezuela) Luis Yepez	$181,740
2nd	(United States) Patrick Truong	$121,120
3rd	(United States) Kyle Grosshanten	$84,010
4th	(United States) Kent Stephens	$59,310
5th	(Spain) Javier Colomar	$42,640
6th	(United States) James Anderson	$31,220
7th	(United States) Matthew Leecy	$23,290
8th	(United States) Stan Jablonski	$17,710
9th	(United States) Daniel Lei	$13,730

=== WSOP International Circuit Montreal - (Canada) (Ring Event) ===
- Venue: Playground Poker Club Kahnawake
- Full Event Dates: March 23-April 7, 2026
- Number of Entries: 1,781
- Buy-in: CA$2,500 (~$1,796)
- Guaranteed Prize Pool: CA$2,500,000 (~$1,796,000)
- Total Prize Pool: CA$4,144,323 (~$2,977,072)
- Number of Payouts: 253

Final Table
Place	Name	Prize (Original)	Prize (U$D)
1st	(Canada) Allen Li-Xin Shen	CA$605,001	$434,602
2nd	(China) Pei Li	CA$400,000	$287,339
3rd	(United States) Brett Apter	CA$278,293	$199,911
4th	(United States) Aaron Gao	CA$200,000	$143,669
5th	(Canada) Sebastian Crema	CA$145,000	$104,160
6th	(Canada) Weiping Gu	CA$115,000	$82,610
7th	(Canada) Ren Zhang	CA$96,000	$68,961
8th	(Canada) Julien Cargnelutti	CA$78,000	$56,031
9th	(Canada) Omid Shahbazian	CA$60,000	$43,100

=== (United States) WSOP Circuit Chicago (Elgin)- Illinois (Ring Event) ===
- Venue: Grand Victoria Casino Elgin
- Full Event Dates: April 2-13, 2026
- Number of Entries: 593
- Buy-in: $1,700 ($1,515 + $185)
- Guaranteed Prize Pool: $750,000
- Total Prize Pool: $898,395
- Number of Payouts: 87

Final Table
Place	Name	Prize
1st	(United States) Grant Juric	$167,608
2nd	(United States) Lee Rzentkowski	$111,742
3rd	(United States) Matthew Shepsky	$77,013
4th	(United States) Thomas Koral	$54,091
5th	(Ukraine) Bohdan Slyvinskyi	$38,731
6th	(United States) John Kamis	$28,282
7th	(United States) Leon Kwauk	$21,071
8th	(Romania) Mihai Taizs	$16,023
9th	(United States) Boshuang Gao	$15,928

=== WSOP International Circuit Aix-en-Provence - (France) (Ring Event) ===
- Venue: Pasino Grand Aix en Provence Aix-en-Provence
- Full Event Dates: April 10-21, 2026
- Number of Entries: 783
- Buy-in: €1,500 (~$1,766)
- Total Prize Pool: €1,014,768 (~$1,194,646)
- Number of Payouts: 105

Final Table
Place	Name	Prize (Original)	Prize (U$D)
1st	(France) Matthieu Cartillier	€150,000	$176,589
2nd	(France) Michel Leibgorin	€107,000	$125,966
3rd	(France) Sonny Franco	€78,000	$91,826
4th	(Cyprus) Georgios Skarparis	€57,368	$67,537
5th	(Finland) Onni Huttunen	€42,500	$50,033
6th	(France) Anthony Apicella	€31,900	$37,554
7th	(Tunisia) Houssem Meftahi	€24,400	$28,725
8th	(Switzerland) Alexis Tremblay	€19,100	$22,485
9th	(Canada) Olivier De Guenyveau	€15,300	$18,012

=== (United States) WSOP Circuit Horseshoe Tunica - Mississippi (Ring Event) ===
- Venue: Horseshoe Casino Tunica
- Full Event Dates: April 16-27, 2026
- Number of Entries: 340
- Buy-in: $1,700 ($1,515 + $185)
- Guaranteed Prize Pool: $400,000
- Total Prize Pool: $515,100
- Number of Payouts: 47

Final Table
Place	Name	Prize
1st	(United States) Preston McEwen	$108,853
2nd	(United States) Charles Hopper	$69,641
3rd	(United States) Dave Alfa	$47,284
4th	(United States) Justin Donato	$41,527
5th	(United States) Levi Carden	$32,969
6th	(United States) Richard Sinclair	$23,623
7th	(United States) William Stanford	$17,408
8th	(United States) Dylan Lemery	$13,204
9th	(United States) Bradley Wilkerson	$10,317

=== (United States) WSOP Circuit Lake Tahoe - Nevada (Ring Event) ===
- Venue: Caesars Republic Lake Tahoe Stateline, Nevada
- Full Event Dates: April 16-27, 2026
- Number of Entries: 463
- Buy-in: $1,700 ($1,515 + $185)
- Total Prize Pool: $701,445
- Number of Payouts: 66

Final Table
Place	Name	Prize
1st	(United States) Adam Nattress	$139,614
2nd	(United States) Ryan Hart	$92,123
3rd	(United States) James Czarnecki	$62,216
4th	(United States) Vanna Tea	$43,024
5th	(United States) Bradley Miller	$30,482
6th	(United States) Moshe Gavrieli	$22,140
7th	(Germany) Andreas Kniep	$16,495
8th	(United States) Kyle Grosshanten	$12,616
9th	(United States) Vy Nguyen	$9,911

=== (United States) WSOP Circuit Austin, Texas (Ring Event) ===
- Venue: TCH Social Austin, Texas
- Full Event Dates: April 23-May 4, 2026
- Number of Entries: 1,709
- Buy-in: $1,700 ($1,515 + $185)
- Guarantee Prize Pool: $1,000,000
- Total Prize Pool: $2,589,135
- Number of Payouts: 247

Final Table
Place	Name	Prize
1st	(United States) Thomas Brabham	$368,545
2nd	(Azerbaijan) David Mzareulov	$245,090
3rd	(United States) Alexis Cruz	$175,170
4th	(United States) Duc Nguyen	$126,830
5th	(United States) Jeremy Guest	$93,960
6th	(United States) Xinguo Wang	$69,190
7th	(Spain) Alejandro Gonzalez	$52,150
8th	(United States) Sharon Aloor	$39,850
9th	(United States) Gabriel Simmons	$30,880

=== WSOP International Circuit Venlo - (Netherlands) (Ring Event) ===
- Venue: Holland Casino Venlo
- Full Event Dates: May 10-16, 2026
- Number of Entries: 851
- Buy-in: €1,500 (€1,350 + €150)(~$1,770)
- Total Prize Pool: €1,114,684 (~$1,315,432)
- Number of Payouts: 128

Final Table
Place	Name	Prize (Original)	Prize (U$D)
1st	(Germany) Martin Lenoch	€200,384	$236,472
2nd	(Germany) Lorenz Freitag	€128,500	$151,642
3rd	(Greece) Panagiotis Mavritsakis	€89,000	$105,028
4th	(Greece) Nanos Konstantinos	€62,700	$73,992
5th	(Germany) Dennis Schmitt	€45,000	$53,104
6th	(Netherlands) Floyd van Houwelingen	€32,800	$38,707
7th	(Germany) Nicolai Striewe	€24,400	$28,794
8th	(Netherlands) Heskey Selva	€18,500	$21,832
9th	(Russia) Ivan Antipov	€14,300	$16,875

=== (United States) WSOP Circuit Cherokee's - North Carolina (Ring Event) ===
- Venue: Harrah's Cherokee
- Full Event Dates: May 15-18, 2026
- Number of Entries: 1,489
- Buy-in: $1,700 ($1,515 + $185)
- Total Prize Pool: $2,255,835
- Number of Payouts: 214

Final Table
Place	Name	Prize
1st	(Iran) Hamid Izadi	$332,405
2nd	(United States) Louis George	$221,559
3rd	(United States) Lou Ojeda	$156,736
4th	(Canada) Konstantin Shukhman	$112,495
5th	(United States) Thomas Beckstead	$81,936
6th	(United States) Nathan Dunlop	$60,575
7th	(United States) Jack Nathan	$45,465
8th	(United States) Jeremiah Fitzpatrick	$34,652
9th	(United States) Tongzhou Sun	$26,827

=== WSOP International Circuit Kahnawake - (Canada) (Ring Event) ===
- Venue: Playground Poker Club Kahnawake
- Full Event Dates: May 21-25, 2026
- Number of Entries: 1,022
- Buy-in: CA$2,500 (~$1,815)
- Guaranteed Prize Pool: CA$2,200,000 (~$1,596,910)
- Total Prize Pool: CA$2,250,342 (~$1,633,452)
- Number of Payouts: 148

Final Table
Place	Name	Prize (Original)	Prize (U$D)
1st	(Canada) Daniel Ghionoiu	CA$370,002	$268,572
2nd	(Canada) Daniel Tsipris	CA$235,000	$170,579
3rd	(Canada) Sylvain Siebert	CA$164,600	$119,477
4th	(Canada) Qi Hu	CA$115,000	$83,474
5th	(United States) Corbin Avery	CA$80,000	$58,069
6th	(Canada) Alexandre Oberson	CA$60,000	$43,552
7th	(Canada) Christopher Clark	CA$47,000	$34,115
8th	(United States) Eric Yanovsky	CA$38,000	$27,583
9th	(Canada) Wing-Yat Yeung	CA$30,000	$21,776

=== (United States) WSOP Circuit New Orleans, Louisiana (Ring Event) ===
- Venue: Caesars New Orleans
- Full Event Dates: May 21-25, 2026
- Number of Entries: 420
- Buy-in: $1,700 ($1,515 + $185)
- Guaranteed Prize Pool: $500,000
- Total Prize Pool: $636,300
- Number of Payouts: 61

Final Table
Place	Name	Prize
1st	(United States) Corey Harrison	$122,221
2nd	(United States) Philip Lucia	$83,543
3rd	(United States) Duane Fontenot	$58,161
4th	(United States) Chad Carver	$41,245
5th	(United States) Justin Smedley	$29,806
6th	(United States) Danny Chang	$21,956
7th	(United States) Shea Dubrock	$16,494
8th	(United States) Chance Walker	$12,640
9th	(United States) Sung Lee	$9,886
