= Lake Tahoe Outdoor Arena =

Coordinates: 38°57′43.2″N 119°56′39.3″W

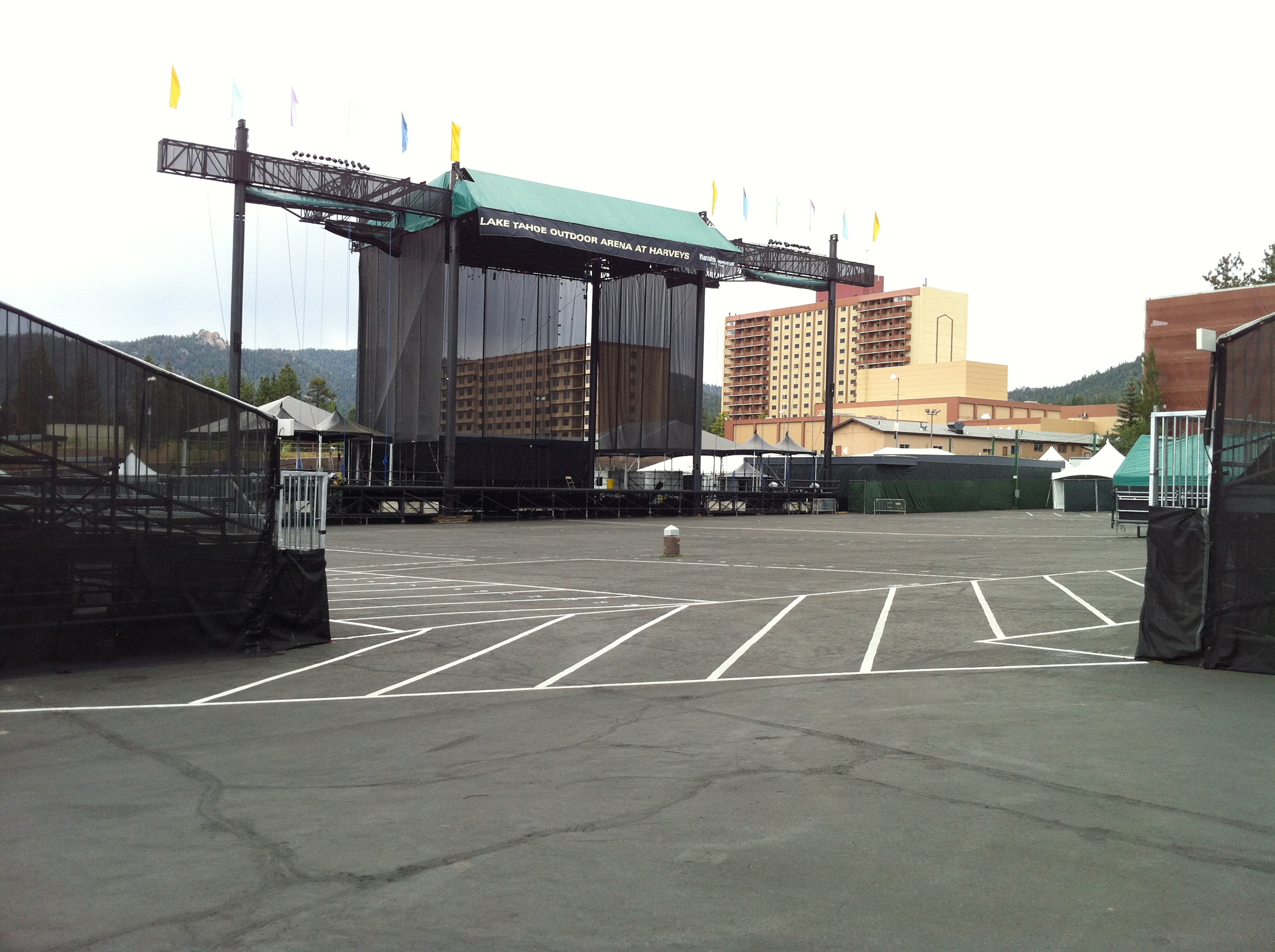
- Venue after set up (c.2014)
- Full name: Lake Tahoe Outdoor Arena at Harveys
- Former names: Harveys Outdoor Amphitheater (1992-2004); Harveys Outdoor Stage (2005); Harveys Outdoor Arena (2006-2015)
- Address: 18 Highway 50; Stateline, NV 89449
- Location: Harveys Lake Tahoe
- Owner: Caesars Entertainment
- Operator: Another Planet Entertainment
- Capacity: 7,500 (reserved); 9,300 (general admission)

Construction
- Opened: July 17, 1992

Tenants
- Lake Tahoe Summer Fest (1992-2002); Outdoor Summer Concert Series (2002-2004); Blues by the Lake (2002-2009); Harveys Summer Concert Series (2005-present)

The Lake Tahoe Outdoor Arena (originally known as Harveys Outdoor Amphitheater) is a temporary outdoor concert venue located in Stateline, Nevada near Lake Tahoe. The venue is located on the grounds of Harveys Lake Tahoe, in the south parking lot behind the parking garage. Opening in 1992, the temporary structure has been the home to several musical events, including the long-running "Harveys Summer Concert Series".

The venue opened on July 7, 1992, with a performance by the Gipsy Kings. At the time, the venue held up to 5,000 spectators. In 2005, former owner, Harrah's Entertainment, hired San Francisco–based promoters, Another Planet Entertainment, for venue operations and event booking. Launching the new concert series, the temporary venue was moved from the north lawn to the parking lot. The capacity increased from 5,000 to 9,300.

Alongside numerous concert, the venue also hosted many comedy acts including: Bill Cosby, Dennis Miller, and Robin Williams.
