= 2025 World Series of Poker Circuit =

WSOP Circuit is a Series of poker tournaments around the world

2025 WSOP Circuit
- League: World Series of Poker Circuit
- Sport: Texas Hold 'em
- Duration: July 27-December 08, 2025
- Streaming partner: YouTube WSOP

WSOPC seasons
- ← 2024–25 2026 →

The 2025 World Series of Poker Circuit was the 22nd annual World Series of Poker Circuit.

The first to get a WSOP bracelet by winning a WSOP Circuit National Championship was Alexis Cruz, who won the WSOPC Dallas/Oklahoma from July 25 - July 28, 2025.

== Event schedule ==
Source: The Hendom Mob: World Series of Poker Circuit season 2025

=== (United States) WSOP Circuit Dallas - Oklahoma (Ring Event) ===
- Venue: Choctaw Casinos Durant
- Full Event Dates: July 16-28, 2025
- Number of Entries: 968
- Buy-in: $1,700 ($1,515 + $185)
- Total Prize Pool: $1,457,250
- Number of Payouts: 141

Final Table
Place	Name	Prize
1st	(United States) Alexis Cruz	$241,412
2nd	(United States) Alexander Rindone	$160,932
3rd	(United States) Peter Clive	$111,537
4th	(United States) Eliran Pilo	$78,692
5th	(United States) Marcus Dickey	$56,535
6th	(United States) Rohini Telukutla	$41,373
7th	(United States) Jacob Thibodeau	$30,853
8th	(United States) Bradley Ritschel	$23,453
9th	(United States) Ahmad Popal	$18,180

=== WSOP International Circuit Tallinn (Estonia) (Ring Event) ===
- Venue: Olympic Park Casino Tallinn
- Full Event Dates: July 25- August 3, 2025
- Number of Entries: 888 (514 entries + 374 re-entries)
- Buy-in: €1,500 (€1,350 + €150)
- Guaranteed Prize Pool: €1,000,000
- Total Prize Pool: €1,138,860 (~$1,328,426)
- Number of Payouts: 135

Final Table
Place	Name	Prize (Original)	Prize (U$D)
1st	(Sweden) Jenny Westerlund	€200,200	$233,524
2nd	(Poland) Krzysztof Chmielowski	€128,500	$149,889
3rd	(Estonia) Igor Pihela Sr.	€90,200	$105,214
4th	(Czech Republic) Martin Surovec	€62,500	$72,903
5th	(Finland) Elias Vaaraniemi	€46,000	$53,657
6th	(Norway) David Vinayagamoorthy	€33,100	$38,610
7th	(Finland) Jari-Pekka Juhola	€25,060	$29,231
8th	(England) Stephen Groom	€19,500	$22,746
9th	(Lithuania) Karolis Kutkauskas	€14,200	$16,564

=== WSOP International Circuit Samorin (Slovakia) (Ring Event) ===
- Venue: Card Casino Šamorín
- Full Event Dates: August 1-12, 2025
- Number of Entries: 882
- Buy-in: €1,500 (€1,350 + €150)
- Guaranteed Prize Pool: €1,000,000
- Total Prize Pool: €1,039,216 (~$1,201,475)
- Number of Payouts: 124

Final Table
Place	Name	Prize (Original)	Prize (U$D)
1st	(Slovakia) Robert Obrtlík	€180,200	$208,335
2nd	(Italy) Erik Olivo	€120,700	$139,545
3rd	(Czech Republic) Michal Schuh	€84,800	$98,040
4th	(Czech Republic) Zdenek Svoboda	€60,050	$69,425
5th	(Germany) Alexis Kivu	€42,850	$49,540
6th	(Poland) Piotr Kuszczak	€31,150	$36,013
7th	(Austria) Rudolf Kosa	€23,450	$27,111
8th	(Sweden) Marcus Allberg	€17,850	$20,637
9th	(Israel) Dmitry Lineburg	€13,750	$15,896

=== (United States) WSOP Circuit Cherokee's North Carolina (Ring Event) ===
- Venue: Harrah's Cherokee
- Full Event Dates: August 7-18, 2025
- Number of Entries: 1,437
- Buy-in: $1,700 ($1,515 + $185)
- Total Prize Pool: $2,177,055
- Number of Payouts: 211

Final Table
Place	Name	Prize
1st	(United States) Zachary Fischer	$324,135
2nd	(United States) J.B. Wells	$216,089
3rd	(United States) Warren Sheaves	$153,035
4th	(United States) Shane Lea	$109,942
5th	(United States) Andrew Smith	$80,140
6th	(United States) Matt Yankowski	$59,284
7th	(United States) Leo Taffe	$44,516
8th	(Canada) Marc Lacroix	$33,939
9th	(United States) Eduardo Paz	$26,277

=== (United States) WSOP Circuit Graton Rohnert Park - California (Ring Event) ===
- Venue: Graton Resort & Casino
- Full Event Dates: August 14-25, 2025
- Number of Entries: 616
- Buy-in: $1,700 ($1,515 + $185)
- Total Prize Pool: $933,240
- Number of Payouts: 79

Final Table
Place	Name	Prize
1st	(United States) Michael Persky	$175,595
2nd	(Thailand) Dan Sarasin	$100,528
3rd	(United States) Jasthi Kumar	$80,135
4th	(Canada) Benjamin Underwood	$60,122
5th	(United States) Paul Vlahos	$45,532
6th	(United States) Zhengxiong Zouxu	$34,890
7th	(United States) Kurt Watkins	$27,055
8th	(United States) Avenes Rastomyan	$21,233
9th	(United States) Benjamin Ludlow	$16,868

=== (United States) WSOP Circuit Atlantic City - New Jersey (Ring Event) ===
- Venue: Harrah's Atlantic City
- Full Event Dates: August 14-25, 2025
- Number of Entries: 635
- Buy-in: $1,700 ($1,515 + $185)
- Total Prize Pool: $962,025
- Number of Payouts: 94

Final Table
Place	Name	Prize
1st	(Ukraine) Bohdan Slyvinskyi	$177,562
2nd	(United States) Demetrius Campbell	$118,368
3rd	(United States) Chang Feng Fan	$81,525
4th	(United States) Michael Marder	$57,226
5th	(United States) Johnny Bromberg	$40,955
6th	(United States) Andrew Kershaw	$29,895
7th	(United States) Dan McGinnis	$22,266
8th	(United States) Rafael Ben-Yaish	$16,929
9th	(United States) Jordan Scheible	$13,144

=== (United States) WSOP Circuit New Orleans - Louisiana (Ring Event) ===
- Venue: Caesars New Orleans
- Full Event Dates: August 21-September 1, 2025
- Number of Entries: 510
- Buy-in: $1,700 ($1,515 + $185)
- Total Prize Pool: $772,650
- Number of Payouts: 77

Final Table
Place	Name	Prize
1st	(United States) Yousef Saleh	$149,268
2nd	(United States) Kane Keller	$99,135
3rd	(United States) Andrew Dykeman	$67,291
4th	(United States) Alexander Jones	$46,704
5th	(United States) Samuel Rosen	$33,161
6th	(United States) Andrew Yurchak	$24,100
7th	(United States) Josh Pridgen	$17,938
8th	(United States) Luke Martin	$13,681
9th	(United States) Brandon Butler	$10,699

=== WSOP International Circuit Deerfoot Inn & Casino Calgary - (Canada) (Ring Event) ===
- Venue: Playground Poker Club Kahnawake
- Full Event Dates: August 18-September 2, 2025
- Number of Entries: 1,978
- Buy-in: CA$2,500 (~$1,813)
- Total Prize Pool: CA$4,450,500 (~$3,227,175)
- Number of Payouts: 283

Final Table
Place	Name	Prize (Original)	Prize (U$D)
1st	(Canada) Jacob Hobday	CA$620,000	$448,456
2nd	(Canada) Adrian Ottorino	CA$402,000	$290,773
3rd	(Canada) Jorge Pacheco	CA$289,000	$209,039
4th	(Canada) Feizal Sanchu	CA$207,000	$149,727
5th	(Canada) William Blais	CA$150,000	$108,498
6th	(Canada) Dustin Melanson	CA$112,000	$81,011
7th	(Senegal) Muhyedine Fares	CA$85,075	$61,536
8th	(United States) William Meeks	CA$65,000	$47,016
9th	(Canada) Alexander Bylicki	CA$50,500	$36,528

=== (United States) WSOP Circuit Omaha - Iowa (Ring Event) ===
- Venue: Horseshoe Council Bluffs
- Full Event Dates: September 4-15, 2025
- Number of Entries: 275
- Buy-in: $1,700 ($1,515 + $185)
- Total Prize Pool: $362,390
- Number of Payouts: 29

Final Table
Place	Name	Prize
1st	(United States) Ryan Brown	$85,239
2nd	(United States) Christopher Rodriguez	$56,852
3rd	(United States) Eric Vogler	$38,900
4th	(United States) William Ellis	$27,324
5th	(United States) Kyle Schmit	$19,717
6th	(United States) Donald Nimneh	$14,627
7th	(United States) Nicholas Raio	$11,164
8th	(United States) Quang Pham	$8,775
9th	(United States) Jay Philips	$7,108

=== (United States) WSOP Circuit Chicago Hammond - Indiana (Ring Event) ===
- Venue: Chicago Horseshoe Hammond
- Full Event Dates: September 11-22, 2025
- Number of Entries: 622
- Buy-in: $1,700 ($1,515 + $185)
- Total Prize Pool: $1,000,000
- Number of Payouts: 62

Final Table
Place	Name	Prize
1st	(United States) Brek Schutten	$185,585
2nd	(United States) Brian Craig	$123,724
3rd	(United States) Merritt Kuhn	$84,267
4th	(United States) Brian Landon	$58,631
5th	(United States) Natan Lidukhover	$41,691
6th	(United States) Andrew Brinkley	$30,315
7th	(United States) Arnestas Armonas	$22,551
8th	(United States) Sung Kim	$17,172
9th	(United States) Jorge Galarza	$13,391

=== (United States) WSOP Circuit Southern Elizabeth - Indiana (Ring Event) ===
- Venue: Southern Indiana Caesars Southern Indiana
- Full Event Dates: September 26-29, 2025
- Number of Entries: 338
- Buy-in: $1,700 ($1,515 + $185)
- Total Prize Pool: $512,070
- Number of Payouts: 52

Final Table
Place	Name	Prize
1st	(Iran) Hamid Izadi	$111,979
2nd	(United States) Maurice Hawkins	$74,244
3rd	(United States) Mark Davis	$50,323
4th	(United States) Ben Ramon	$34,891
5th	(United States) Heath Pender	$24,759
6th	(United States) Brevin Andreadis	$17,990
7th	(United States) Brent Young	$13,394
8th	(United States) Robert Hankins	$10,223
9th	(United States) Adam Thomas	$8,005

=== (United States) WSOP Circuit Thunder Valley Lincoln - California (Ring Event) ===
- Venue: Thunder Valley Casino Resort
- Full Event Dates:September 25-October 06, 2025
- Number of Entries: 646
- Buy-in: $1,700 ($1,515 + $185)
- Total Prize Pool: $1,000,000
- Number of Payouts: 98

Final Table
Place	Name	Prize
1st	(Germany) Andreas Kniep	$185,458
2nd	(United States) Benjamin Primus	$123,603
3rd	(United States) Jennifer Molan	$85,666
4th	(United States) Chris Elkins	$60,439
5th	(China) Zichuan Huang	$43,421
6th	(United States) Sarkis Khachatryan	$31,776
7th	(United States) Scott Stewart	$23,696
8th	(United States) Derric Haynie	$18,013
9th	(United States) Anthony Swift	$13,962

=== WSOP International Circuit Deerfoot Inn & Casino Calgary - (Canada) (Ring Event) ===
- Venue: Deerfoot Calgary
- Full Event Dates: October 1-13, 2025
- Number of Entries: 910
- Buy-in: CA$2,300 (CA$2,050 + CA$250) (~$1,583)
- Total Prize Pool: CA$1,865,500 (~$1,336,826)
- Number of Payouts: 134

Final Table
Place	Name	Prize (Original)	Prize (U$D)
1st	(Canada) Travis MacMillan	CA$312,965	$224,272
2nd	(Canada) Victor Li	CA$208,615	$149,494
3rd	(Canada) Kwong Au	CA$146,349	$104,874
4th	(Canada) Sheraz Nasir	CA$104,305	$74,745
5th	(Canada) Kyle Chang	CA$75,546	$54,137
6th	(Canada) Jun-Yu Huang	CA$55,618	$39,856
7th	(Canada) Nicholas Lee	CA$41,633	$29,834
8th	(Canada) Gabriel Vezina	CA$31,696	$22,713
9th	(Canada) Calvin Chow	CA$24,549	$17,592

=== (United States) WSOP Circuit Baltimore - Maryland (Ring Event) ===
- Venue: Horseshoe Casino Baltimore
- Full Event Dates: October 02-13, 2025
- Number of Entries: 332
- Buy-in: $1,700 ($1,515 + $185)
- Total Prize Pool: $502,980
- Number of Payouts: 50

Final Table
Place	Name	Prize
1st	(United States) Aaron Pinson	$102,668
2nd	(United States) Joshua Mischel	$68,489
3rd	(United States) Jimmy Born	$46,792
4th	(United States) Christian Harder	$32,759
5th	(United States) Matthew Richardson	$23,516
6th	(United States) Harrison Dobin	$17,320
7th	(United States) Dennis Grizzle II	$13,097
8th	(United States) Anthony McIe	$10,175
9th	(United States) Changfeng Fan	$8,128

=== (United States) WSOP Circuit Harrah's Pompano Beach - Florida (Ring Event) ===
- Venue: Harrah's Pompano Beach
- Full Event Dates: October 9-20, 2025
- Number of Entries: 820
- Buy-in: $1,700 ($1,515 + $185)
- Guaranteed Prize Pool: $1,000,000
- Total Prize Pool: $1,242,300
- Number of Payouts: 119

Final Table
Place	Name	Prize
1st	(United States) Carter McMahon	$212,703
2nd	(United States) Ricardo Eyzaguirre	$141,777
3rd	(United States) Jeffrey Gale	$97,967
4th	(United States) Maurice Hawkins	$68,952
5th	(United States) Romeo Mendoza	$49,449
6th	(United States) Matthew Yorra	$36,146
7th	(United States) Stewart Yancik	$26,942
8th	(United States) Anthony Ruttler	$20,484
9th	(United States) Joshua Gibson	$15,893

=== WSOP International Circuit Merit Royal Diamond Karavas - (Cyprus) (Ring Event) ===
- Venue: Merit Royal Diamond
- Full Event Dates: October 9-21, 2025
- Number of Entries: 1,372
- Buy-in: $5,300
- Total Prize Pool: $6,517,000
- Number of Payouts: 206

Final Table
Place	Name	Prize
1st	(Germany) Harald Sammer	$1,000,000
2nd	(Austria) Daniel Rezaei	$670,000
3rd	(Portugal) Bernardo Neves	$475,000
4th	(Iraq) Ali Al-Kubasi	$345,000
5th	(England) Jonathon Kalmar	$250,000
6th	(Russia) Konstantin Voronin	$185,000
7th	(Bulgaria) Radoslav Stoyanov	$140,000
8th	(Romania) Andrei Spătaru	$107,500
9th	(Cyprus) Georgios Tsouloftas	$82,000

=== (United States) WSOP Circuit Lake Tahoe - Nevada (Ring Event) ===
- Venue: Caesars Republic Lake Tahoe Stateline, Nevada
- Full Event Dates: October 23-November 03, 2025
- Number of Entries: 463
- Buy-in: $1,700 ($1,515 + $185)
- Total Prize Pool: $660,540
- Number of Payouts: 64

Final Table
Place	Name	Prize
1st	(United States) Evan Sandberg	$125,269
2nd	(United States) Francisco Trujillo	$85,639
3rd	(United States) Timothy Thorp	$59,620
4th	(United States) Melanie Pittard	$42,280
5th	(United States) Casey Sandretto	$30,554
6th	(United States) Dustin Fox	$22,507
7th	(Canada) Eric Afriat	$16,908
8th	(United States) Ryan Awwad	$12,957
9th	(United States) Bradley Hinson	$10,134

=== WSOP International Circuit King's Resort Rozvadov - (Czech Republic) (Ring Event) ===
- Venue: King's Casino
- Full Event Dates: October 22-November 04, 2025
- Number of Entries: 544
- Buy-in: €1,500
- Guaranteed Prize Pool: €1,000,000
- Total Prize Pool: €870,000 ($1,008,649)
- Number of Payouts: 83

Final Table
Place	Name	Prize (Original)	Prize (U$D)
1st	(Italy) Claudio Di Giacomo	€165,000	$191,295
2nd	(Germany) Stefano Aprile	€111,000	$128,690
3rd	(Ukraine) Taras Sopotnytskiy	€76,000	$88,112
4th	(Ukraine) Vladimir Kokoulin	€53,500	$62,026
5th	(Czech Republic) Zdenek Zizka	€39,000	$45,215
6th	(Czech Republic) Ondrej Mar	€29,000	$33,622
7th	(Germany) Fabian Wolf	€22,000	$25,506
8th	(Russia) Ivan Kolesnikov	€17,500	$20,289
9th	(Italy) Guido Presti	€14,200	$16,463

=== (United States) WSOP Circuit Choctaw Durant - Oklahoma (Ring Event) ===
- Venue: Choctaw Casinos Durant
- Full Event Dates: October 29-November 10, 2025
- Number of Entries: 849
- Buy-in: $1,700 ($1,515 + $185)
- Total Prize Pool: $1,135,113
- Number of Payouts: 128

Final Table
Place	Name	Prize
1st	(United States) Matthew Higgins	$218,436
2nd	(United States) Jeremy Bowman	$145,618
3rd	(United States) Damarjai Davenport	$100,399
4th	(United States) Schuyler Thornton	$70,535
5th	(United States) Zachary Peay	$50,513
6th	(United States) Wesley Jones	$36,888
7th	(United States) Cody Jorgenson	$27,480
8th	(United States) Nikola Mircetic	$20,892
9th	(United States) Lucas Jumalon	$16,216

=== WSOP International Circuit Deerfoot Inn & Casino Calgary - (Canada) (Ring Event) ===
- Venue: Deerfoot Calgary
- Full Event Dates: November 03-18, 2025
- Number of Entries: 1,483
- Buy-in: CA$2,500 (~$1,785)
- Guaranteed Prize Pool: CA$2,500,000
- Total Prize Pool: CA$3,265,417 (~$2,330,926)
- Number of Payouts: 215

Final Table
Place	Name	Prize (Original)	Prize (U$D)
1st	(Canada) Kliment Tarmakov	CA$481,500	$343,705
2nd	(Canada) David Quang	CA$320,700	$228,923
3rd	(Canada) Patros Behnam	CA$226,300	$161,538
4th	(Canada) Ricardo Cermeno-Sandoval	CA$162,100	$115,711
5th	(United States) David Orlando	CA$117,900	$84,160
6th	(Canada) Charan Malhotra	CA$87,100	$62,174
7th	(Canada) Matthew Desaulniers	CA$65,300	$46,613
8th	(Canada) Jamie Sequeira	CA$49,800	$35,548
9th	(Canada) Shaan Siddiqui	CA$38,607	$27,559

=== WSOP International Circuit Panama City - (Panama) (Ring Event) ===
- Venue: Hilton Hotel Panama City
- Full Event Dates: November 06-16, 2025
- Number of Entries: 547
- Buy-in: $1,700
- Total Prize Pool: $669,800
- Number of Payouts: 80

Final Table
Place	Name	Prize
1st	(Colombia) Jorge Guzman Florez	$143,600
2nd	(United States) Nicholas Atehortua	$94,000
3rd	(Canada) Alan Engel	$63,500
4th	(Czech Republic) Josef Blazek	$47,000
5th	(Canada) Jonathan Miranda	$30,800
6th	(Colombia) Gloria Vallejo	$22,400
7th	(Russia) Fedor Truntsev	$16,600
8th	(Costa Rica) Fabrizio Chagnon	$12,700
9th	(Colombia) Javier Nuñez	$9,950

=== WSOP International Circuit Middelkerke (Belgium) ===
- Venue: Partouche Casino Middelkerke
- Full Event Dates: November 06-16, 2025
- Number of Entries: 414
- Buy-in: €1,500 (€1,350 + €150)
- Total Prize Pool: €569,250(~$658,146)
- Number of Payouts: 65

Final Table
Place	Name	Prize (Original)	Prize (U$D)
1st	(Algeria) Omar Lakhdari	€118,000	$136,427
2nd	(Poland) Radoslaw Kopec	€78,300	$90,528
3rd	(Czech Republic) Jakub Štěrba	€53,800	$62,202
4th	(France) Cecile Ticherfatine	€37,600	$43,472
5th	(France) Klaas Vercruysse	€26,800	$30,985
6th	(Italy) Christian Di Salvio	€19,450	$22,487
7th	(Belgium) André De Bock	€14,400	$16,649
8th	(Belgium) Xander Michielsen	€10,900	$12,602
9th	(France) Sonny Franco	€8,400	$9,712

=== (United States) WSOP Circuit Chicago Elgin - Illinois (Ring Event) ===
- Venue: Grand Victoria Casino Elgin
- Full Event Dates: November 06-17, 2025
- Number of Entries: 693
- Buy-in: $1,700 ($1,515 + $185)
- Guaranteed Prize Pool: $750,000
- Total Prize Pool: $1,049,895
- Number of Payouts: 104

Final Table
Place	Name	Prize
1st	(Romania) Mihai Taizs	$188,095
2nd	(United States) Angel Suarez	$125,390
3rd	(Ukraine) Bohdan Slyvinskyi	$86,342
4th	(United States) Jai Vallurupalli	$60,600
5th	(United States) Cero Zuccarello	$46,863
6th	(United States) John Reading	$31,660
7th	(United States) Glen Nelson	$23,585
8th	(United States) Michael Herget	$17,937
9th	(United States) Michele Vavalle	$13,932

=== (United States) WSOP Circuit Commerce Los Angeles - California (Ring Event) ===
- Venue: Commerce Casino
- Full Event Dates: November 12-25, 2025
- Number of Entries: 820
- Buy-in: $1,700 ($1,515 + $185)
- Guaranteed Prize Pool: $1,000,000
- Total Prize Pool: $1,242,300
- Number of Payouts: 104

Final Table
Place	Name	Prize
1st	(United States) David Gonzalez	$213,524
2nd	(Venezuela) Luis Yepez	$142,338
3rd	(United States) Zelin Wang	$99,328
4th	(United States) Elad Elmakia	$70,476
5th	(United States) Daniel Junemo Lee	$50,857
6th	(United States) Joshua Fields	$37,337
7th	(United States) Omar Bravo	$27,894
8th	(United States) Chad Lipton	$21,214
9th	(United States) Andrew Ostapchenko	$16,429

=== WSOP International Circuit Dusk Till Dawn Nottingham (England) (Ring Event) ===
- Venue: Dusk Till Dawn Nottingham
- Full Event Dates: November 14-24, 2025
- Number of Entries: 845
- Buy-in: £1,500 (£1,350 + £150)
- Guaranteed Prize Pool: £1,000,000
- Total Prize Pool: £1,095,120 (~$1,435,489)
- Number of Payouts: 129

Final Table
Place	Name	Prize (Original)	Prize (U$D)
1st	(England) Francis Obadun	£189,030	$247,781
2nd	(England) Jack O'Neill	£126,005	$165,168
3rd	(India) Pranav Agarwal	£88,195	$115,606
4th	(England) Gilbert Black	£62,725	$82,220
5th	(England) Sandeep Shah	£45,350	$59,445
6th	(England) Mark Stokes	£33,335	$43,696
7th	(England) Stephen O'Keeffe	£24,920	$32,665
8th	(England) Nigel Chukwu	£18,950	$24,840
9th	(England) Danish Gandhi	£14,670	$19,230

=== WSOP International Circuit Rosario (Argentina) (Ring Event) ===
- Venue: City Center Rosario
- Full Event Dates: November 15-23, 2025
- Number of Entries: 501
- Buy-in: $1,700
- Total Prize Pool: $757,013
- Number of Payouts: 76

Final Table
Place	Name	Prize
1st	(Argentina) Gonzalo Velozo	$154,113
2nd	(Russia) Roman Narulin	$100,000
3rd	(Argentina) Christian Sare	$67,500
4th	(Argentina) Leandro Bianchini	$46,500
5th	(Argentina) Valentín Piergentile	$33,000
6th	(Argentina) Manuel Safian	$24,000
7th	(Argentina) Sergio Cobo	$17,700
8th	(Argentina) Juan Barattini	$13,500
9th	(Argentina) Mateo Urretavizcaya	$10,500

=== WSOP International Circuit The Star Gold Coast Sydney (Australia) (Ring Event) ===
- Venue: The Star Sydney
- Full Event Dates: November 20-December 02, 2025
- Number of Entries: 667
- Buy-in: A$2,500 (A$2,200 + A$300)
- Total Prize Pool:A$1,471,800 (~$961,119)
- Number of Payouts: 101

Final Table
Place	Name	Prize (Original)	Prize (U$D)
1st	(China) Yuanting Wang	A$280,050	$182,879
2nd	(Australia) Hussein Salman	A$173,070	$113,018
3rd	(Australia) Shane Dye	A$127,337	$83,153
4th	(Australia) Salvatore Fazzino	A$94,782	$61,894
5th	(Australia) Joe Hachem	A$71,385	$46,616
6th	(Japan) Hayato Kitajima	A$54,405	$35,527
7th	(Hong Kong) Chun Lau	A$41,967	$27,405
8th	(Australia) Unensaikhan Bolovson	A$32,768	$21,398
9th	(Australia) Emanuel Seal	A$25,902	$16,914

=== WSOP International Circuit Sanremo (Italy) ===
- Venue: Sanremo Casino Sanremo
- Full Event Dates: November 21-December 02, 2025
- Number of Entries: 871
- Buy-in: €1,500 (€1,350 + €150)
- Total Prize Pool: €1,105,299 (~$1,280,437)
- Number of Payouts: 118

Final Table
Place	Name	Prize (Original)	Prize (U$D)
1st	(France) Gregory Grech	€138,892	$160,900
2nd	(Italy) Luca Bernardis	€128,308	$148,638
3rd	(Italy) Alessandro Orsi Smittarello	€79,599	$92,211
4th	(France) Alexandre Doyer	€60,450	$70,028
5th	(Cyprus) Hasan Halil	€46,300	$53,636
6th	(France) Fabien Motte	€35,650	$41,298
7th	(Italy) Claudio Daffina	€27,600	$31,973
8th	(France) Alan Zagury	€21,550	$24,964
9th	(Italy) Alessandro Confalone	€17,000	$19,693

=== (United States) WSOP Circuit Cherokee's - North Carolina (Ring Event) ===
- Venue: Harrah's Cherokee
- Full Event Dates: November 27-December 08, 2025
- Number of Entries: 1,190
- Buy-in: $1,700 ($1,515 + $185)
- Guaranteed Prize Pool: $1,500,000
- Total Prize Pool: $1,802,850
- Number of Payouts: 176

Final Table
Place	Name	Prize
1st	(United States) Derek Sein-Lwin	$281,514
2nd	(United States) Patrick Plott	$191,287
3rd	(Ukraine) Vladyslav Shovkovyi	$131,702
4th	(United States) Rohit Kwatra	$93,884
5th	(United States) Jacob Ferro	$68,001
6th	(United States) Sanjay Gehi	$50,059
7th	(United States) Sokchheka Pho	$37,463
8th	(United States) Eric Yanovsky	$28,510
9th	(United States) Ricardo Eyzaguirre	$22,069
