= Harrah's Lake Tahoe =

Hotel and casino in Stateline, Nevada

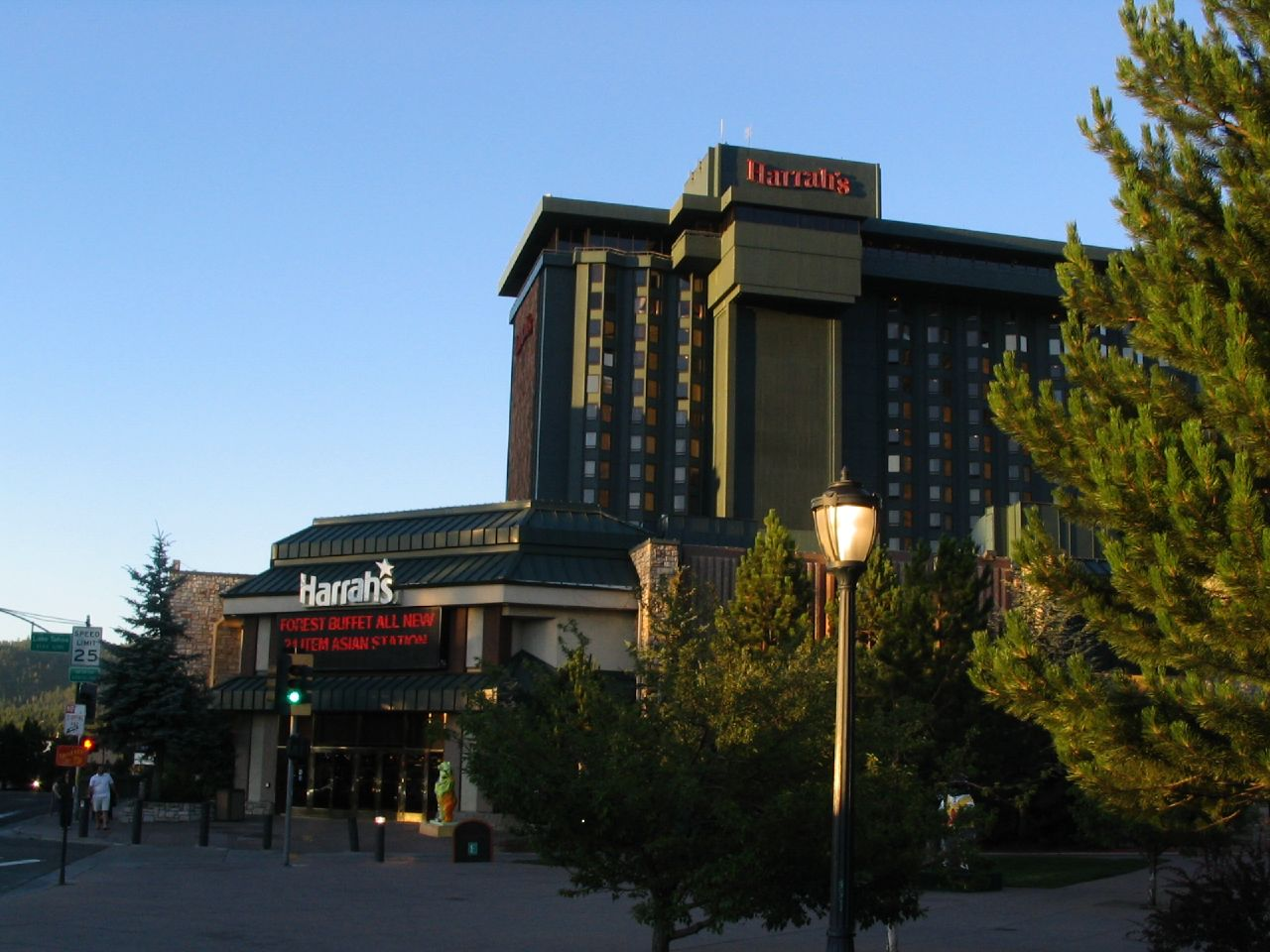
- Interactive map of Harrah's Lake Tahoe
- Location: Stateline, Nevada, U.S.; 15 U.S. Route 50; 38.959425°N 119.941628°W
- Opened: June 20, 1955; 71 years ago
- Theme: Pavilion
- No. of rooms: 512
- Gaming space: 65,000 sq ft (6,000 m^{2})
- Signature attractions: South Shore Room
- Notable restaurants: American River Café; Fatburger; Forest Buffet (until 2020); Friday's Station Steak & Seafood Grill; Starbucks; Sushi Kai; Tahoe Italian Kitchen; Thai Asian
- Casino type: Land-based
- Owner: Vici Properties
- Operating license holder: Caesars Entertainment
- Architect: Martin Stern Jr. and Associates
- Previous names: Stateline Country Club; Nevada Club; Harrah’s Stateline Club
- Website: caesars.com/harrahs-tahoe

Harrah's Lake Tahoe is a hotel and casino in Stateline, Nevada. Harrah's is branded with the name of its former owner and operator, William F. Harrah. It is owned by Vici Properties and operated by Caesars Entertainment. The 18-story tower and 512 rooms, plus 65,000 sq ft (6,000 m^{2}) casino make it one of the largest resorts at South Lake Tahoe.

== History ==
Harrah's was established in Lake Tahoe when William F. Harrah purchased George's Gateway Club in January 1955, for $500,000. Harrah's Lake Club opened on June 20, 1955, and was later renamed Harveys Lake Tahoe.

In 1956, Harrah's Lake Club was sold for $5.25 million in cash to Harvey Gross, which at the time was the most expensive casino purchase ever. In 1958, Bill Harrah acquired an interest in the Stateline Country Club and Nevada Club across the street from Harrah's modern location and opened Harrah's Stateline Club.

Also in 1956, a new radio station, KOWL, opened its studio inside the Harrah's Stateline Club. They were located on the upper floor. The station's transmitter and broadcast tower were roughly two miles south of the casino in South Lake Tahoe, California.

The South Shore Room opened in 1959, at a cost of $3.5 million. This 750-seat showroom, whose opening act was comedian Red Skelton, made entertainment a priority at Harrah's.

External audio
- Guy Lombardo and His Royal Canadians performing live at Harrah's Club Lake Tahoe in 1960; Here on Archive.org'

By 1960, Guy Lombardo and his Royal Canadians Orchestra also appeared at Harrah's in collaboration with the vocalists Kenney Gardner, Cliff Glass and Bill Flannigan. Their performance featured popular songs composed by his brother Carmen including: Boo-Hoo and Return To Me. Lombardo concluded the concert leading the audience in a sing-along which was followed by a rousing chorus of Auld Lang Syne. The concert was recorded live for Capitol Records (T1393, 1960).

In 1962, Harrah's interiors were used for the Curtis Enterprises and Universal-International Pictures film 40 Pounds of Trouble, starring Tony Curtis, Suzanne Pleshette and Phil Silvers. The comedy film was about a gambler who dies and leaves his daughter in the hands of the casino's manager. The film had its premiere on January 19, 1963, at Harrah's South Shore Room, which Curtis and his wife Christine Kaufmann attended.

In 1963, Barry Keenan, Joseph Amsler and John Irwin abducted Frank Sinatra Jr., the 19-year-old son of singer Frank Sinatra, after his performance at the South Shore Room opening for George Jessel.

Harrah had been planning to build a hotel at Lake Tahoe for many years, but had been hindered by costs. However, in 1971, when Harrah's went public, he finally acquired the finances to build his dream hotel. In 1972, Harrah broke ground on his $25-million, 18-story, 250-room hotel which opened on November 9, 1973. Each 500 sq ft (46 m^{2}) room was furnished with a fully stocked bar, bay windows, two bathrooms with TVs and telephones. It earned the first five-star diamond rating in casino history. The 20-story pre-cast concrete sculpted building façade was designed and constructed by Thomas J. Geever.

The hotel was expanded in 1976 with 290 additional rooms.

In April 1980, serial killers Gerald and Charlene Gallego stayed at the hotel just one day after murdering their fifth and sixth victims. At Gerald's 1984 trial, his defense attempted to use this information to provide him with an alibi.

The hotel and casino were damaged on August 27, 1980, when a bomb planted by terrorist and extortionist John Birges across the street in Harveys Lake Tahoe exploded, destroying the neighboring casino. Harrah's, which was connected to Harvey's via a tunnel, suffered damage from the explosion, mostly from shattered windows. No one was injured in the explosion and both casinos were empty when the bomb detonated.

Portions of the Bette Midler film Jinxed! were shot on location at Harrah's in the summer of 1981 for the summer 1982 release of the film. Other locations used in the film were Harrah's in Reno, and the Harrah's Auto Museum, also in Reno.

In response to their growing Broadway-style production, the hotel and casino installed a temporary $4,000 stage floor in 1992 to showcase tapdancing.

In 2000, a $26 million renovation was done to update the casino, hotel rooms and restaurants on the 18th floor including the Forest Buffet and Friday's Station.

On December 3, 2005, a shootout occurred in a private booth near the casino floor. One person was killed and two Douglas County Sheriff's Deputies were injured.

Caesars Entertainment began a major effort to remodel and revitalize Harrah's Lake Tahoe beginning in 2005; they remodeled floors 12 to 15 of the hotel and remade the rooms in mini suites with large couches, dry bars and brand new décor and furniture. The remodel was completed in mid-2006. Following the hotel remodel, Caesars completely remodeled the hotel's lobby and added a food court and luxury diamond outlet signature to Caesars called Park Place Jewelers in 2007. In 2008, Caesars added an upscale, luxury Chinese/Cantonese restaurant called Gi Fu Loh.

In July of 2006, the hotel's penthouse was allegedly the site of a rendezvous between Donald Trump and Stormy Daniels, which led to the Stormy Daniels–Donald Trump scandal. The reported encounter happened during that year's American Century Championship celebrity golf tournament held at the nearby Edgewood Tahoe Resort.

On October 6, 2017, ownership of the property was transferred to Vici Properties as part of a corporate spin-off, and it was leased back to Caesars Entertainment.

There is access to Harveys via an underground pathway that features an arcade and live acts at Sammy Hagar's CaboWabo.
