= Harvey's Resort Hotel bombing =

1980 extortion attempt in Stateline, Nevada, United States

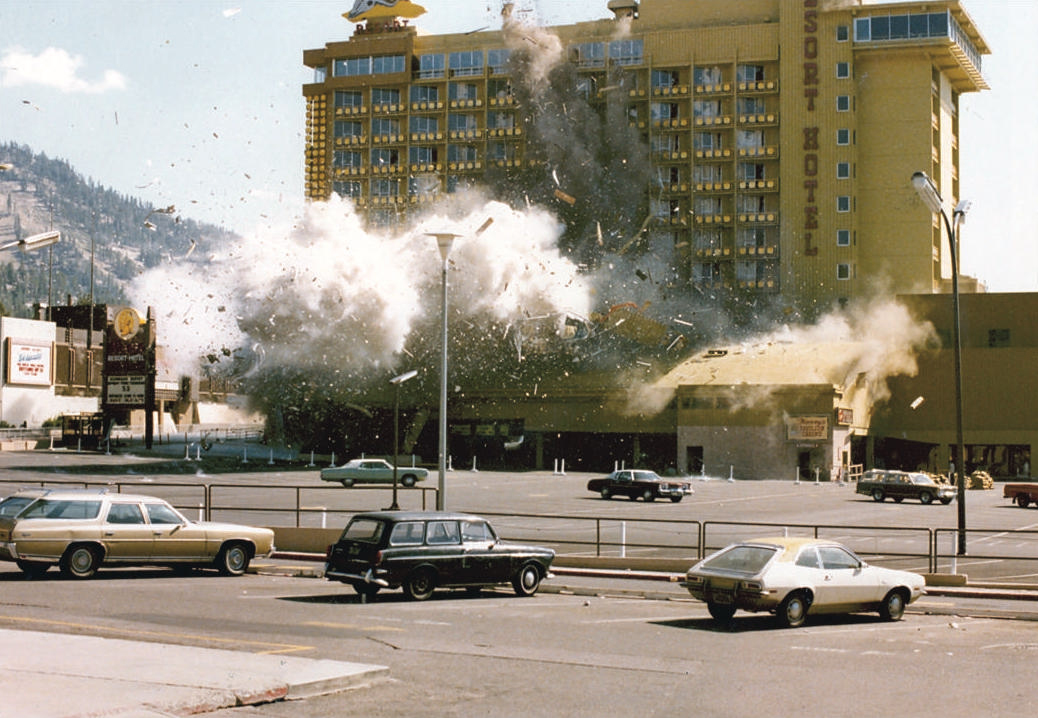
- The bomb explosion on August 27, 1980
- Location: 38.9602°N 119.9420°W; Stateline, Nevada
- Date: August 26–27, 1980 (46 years ago)
- Target: Harvey's Resort Hotel
- Attack type: Bombing, attempted extortion
- Weapon: Dynamite improvised explosive device
- Deaths: 0
- Injuries: 0
- Perpetrators: John Birges; Terry Lee Hall; Willis (Bill) Brown; Ella Joan Williams
- Motive: Extortion; Gambling debt

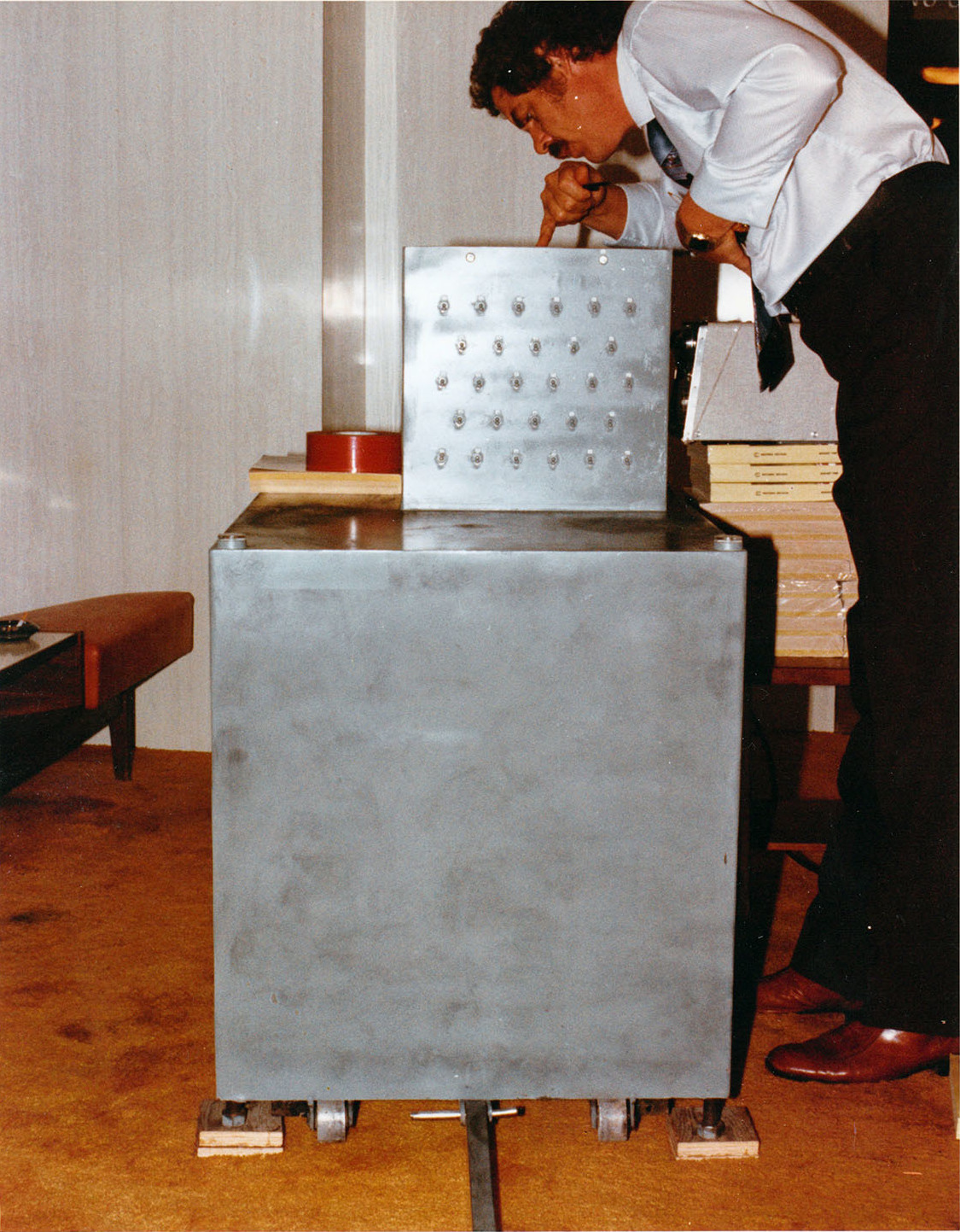
Nevada State Fire Marshal Thomas J. Huddleston examining the bomb

On August 26–27, 1980, several men masquerading as photocopier deliverers planted an elaborately booby trapped bomb containing 1,200 pounds (540 kg) of dynamite at Harvey's Resort Hotel ("Harveys" since 1986) in Stateline, Nevada, United States. During an attempt to disarm the bomb, it exploded, causing extensive damage to the hotel but no injuries or deaths. The total cost of the damage was estimated to be around $18 million ($70.3 million in 2025). John Birges Sr. was convicted of having made the bomb with a goal of extorting money from the casino after having lost $750,000 there ($2.93 million in 2025). He died in prison in 1996 at age 74.

== Background ==
John Birges Sr. (born János Birgés, 1922) was a Hungarian immigrant to the US, settling in Clovis, California. He claimed to later biographers he flew for the Luftwaffe during World War II, during which time he provided intelligence to the United States. He was captured and sentenced to 25 years of hard labor in a Siberian gulag. In 1956, eight years into his sentence in the gulag, he was released during a period of mass repatriation of POWs held in the Soviet Union to their home countries and returned to Hungary. From there, he emigrated to the United States in 1957. Birges built a successful landscaping business, but his addiction to gambling led to his losing a large amount of money and prompted the bomb plot. His gambling debt and experience with explosives were primary pieces of evidence linking him to the bombing.

Two months before the bombing, in June 1980, a dynamite blast in the area of north Fresno and Clovis destroyed the wooden-truss Dry Creek bridge located at the corner of Shepherd and DeWolf avenues. Authorities later found additional hidden dynamite in an area adjacent to the creek. Federal agents believed the destruction of the bridge was a test run of the bomb later used at the hotel.

== Bombing ==
As the mastermind behind the bomb, Birges was attempting to extort $3 million ($11.7 million in 2025) from the casino, claiming he had lost $750,000 ($2.93 million in 2025) gambling there.

The bomb was delivered to the casino's second floor by two men posing as technicians; witnesses spotted a white van marked with "IBM" on the side. The bomb, one of the largest the FBI had ever seen, was loaded with an estimated 1,000 lb (450 kg) of dynamite stolen from a construction site in Fresno, California.

The Federal Bureau of Investigation (FBI) went to the spot that they believed to be the ransom drop, but Birges was waiting at a different location due to vague directions. No money was paid to Birges.

The bomb was cleverly built and virtually tamper-proof. The ransom note stated that the bomb could not be disarmed even by the bomb builder, but if paid $3 million, he would give instructions on which combination of switches would allow the bomb to be moved and remotely detonated. The FBI determined that it would take four men to move it, and there was no way to know if the bomb was disarmed or safe to move. The FBI decided that the bomb would have to be disarmed in the hotel. All guests and staff were evacuated from the hotel and the gas main was shut off.

After studying the bomb for more than a day through X-rays, bomb technicians decided that, although there were warnings from the bomb maker that a shock would trigger the device, the best hope of disarming it was by separating the detonators from the dynamite. The technicians thought this could be accomplished using a shaped charge of C-4. The attempt to disarm the bomb failed as the technicians did not know a second power source was present in the bottom box. The bomb destroyed much of the hotel, although no one was injured. The explosion also damaged Harrah's Casino (connected to Harvey's Resort via a tunnel), breaking many of its windows.

The bomb caused an estimated $18 million ($70.3 million in 2025) in total damages. Parts of Harvey's casino reopened within 48 hours, and the fully repaired and renovated hotel reopened in May 1981.

== Investigation ==
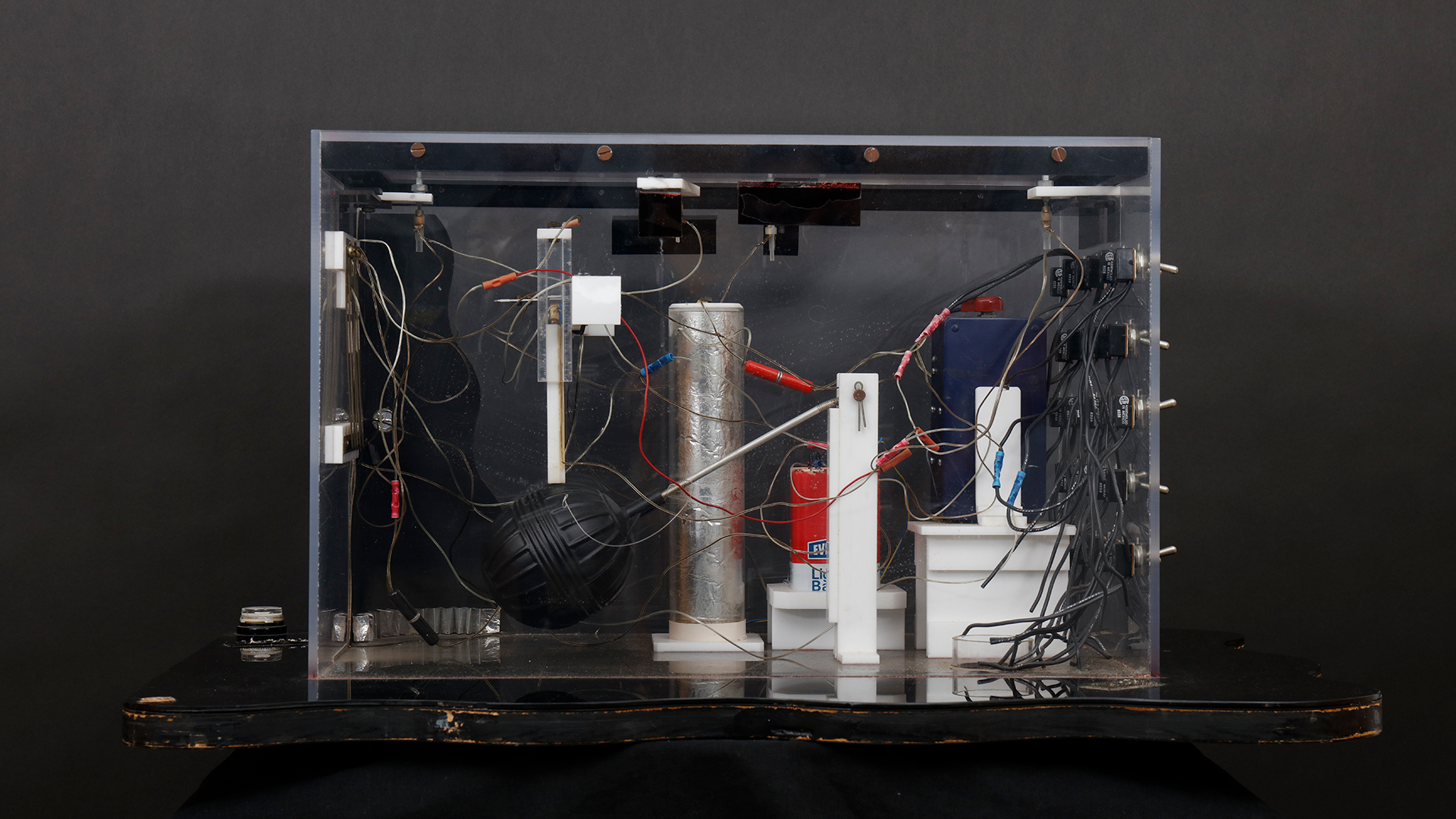
A trial model of Harvey's Casino Bomb created by the FBI.

According to FBI experts, the Harvey's bomb remains the most complex improvised explosive device they have examined, and a replica of "the machine", as the extortionists called it, was still used in FBI training as of 2009.

Birges was investigated as a possible suspect due to his white van being identified as being in nearby South Lake Tahoe at the time of the bombing. Birges was eventually arrested based on a tip. One of his sons had revealed to his then-girlfriend that his father had placed a bomb in Harvey's. After the two broke up, she was on a date with another man when they heard about a reward for information, and she informed her new boyfriend about Birges. This man then called the FBI.

== Pleas and convictions ==
John Birges' two sons both entered pleas of guilty in 1981 for their roles in the bombing, serving no prison time in exchange for testifying against their father. Birges was convicted in 1982 and sentenced to life in prison without parole.

Birges' two accomplices who delivered the bomb to Harvey's were convicted and subsequently sentenced: Terry Lee Hall, in 1982, of conspiracy and interstate transport of explosives with a sentence of seven years in prison; and Hall's father-in-law Willis "Bill" Brown, who entered a plea of guilty in exchange for a sentence of seven years in prison.

In 1983, the final defendant, Ella Joan Williams, who was a former California probation officer and Birges' girlfriend, was named by prosecutors as the typist of the extortion letter and convicted of attempted extortion, conspiracy, and interstate travel in aid of extortion. In 1984, Williams' initial conviction was overturned on appeal. In May 1985, Williams pled guilty to being an accessory in the extortion-bombing and received a recommendation for parole from prosecutors.

On August 28, 1996, at the age of 74, Birges died of liver cancer at the Southern Nevada Correctional Center, 16 years and a day after the bombing.
