= Lakeside Inn (Stateline) =

Casino hotel in Nevada, United States

Coordinates: 38°58′09.2″N 119°56′09.9″W

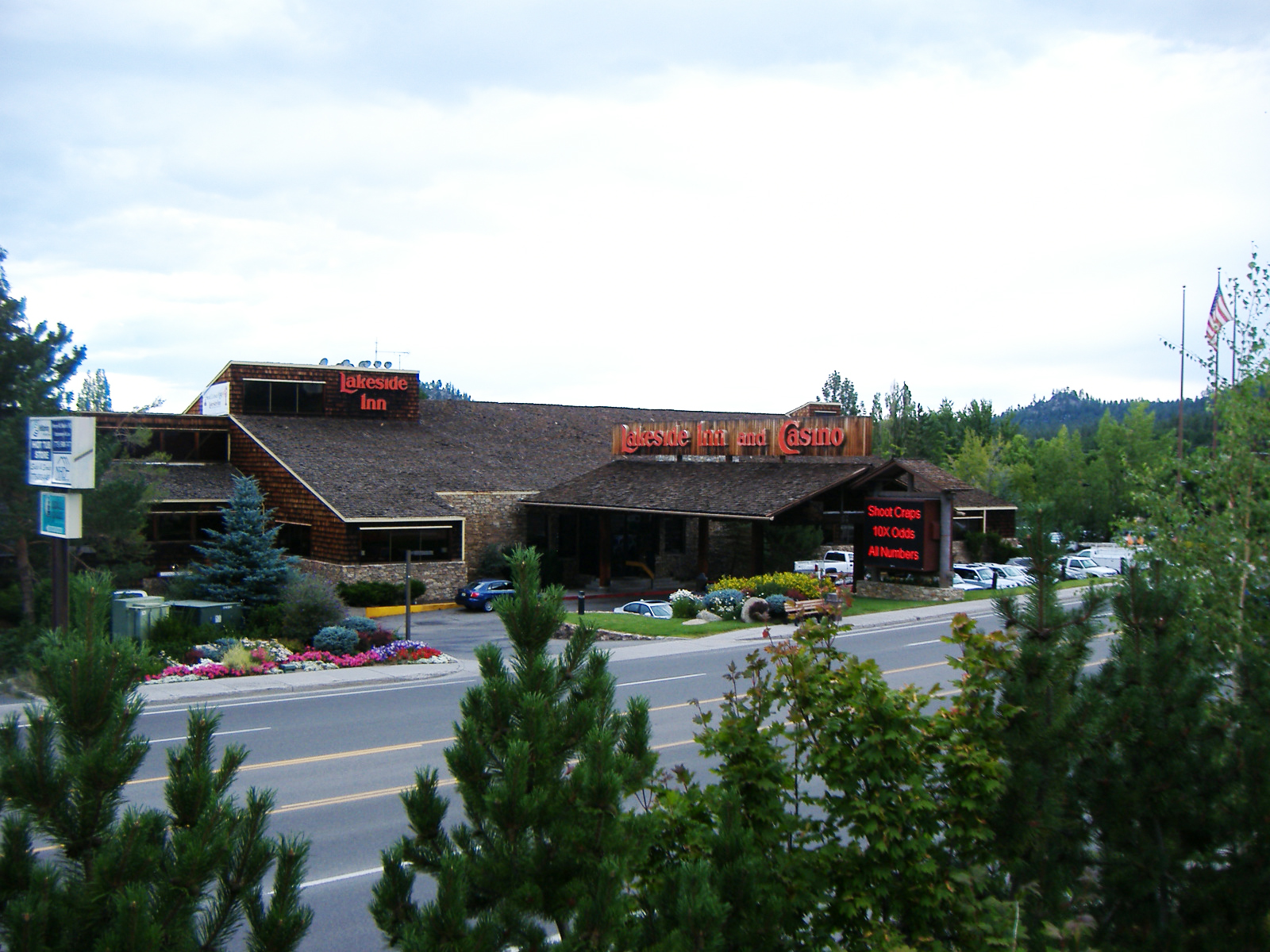
- Interactive map of Lakeside Inn
- Location: Stateline, Nevada, U.S.; 168 U.S. Route 50
- Opened: 1946; 80 years ago
- Closed: March 17, 2020; 6 years ago
- Theme: Rustic Lodge
- No. of rooms: 123
- Gaming space: 17,852 sq ft (1,658.5 m^{2})
- Notable restaurants: Latin Soul Restaurant; The Timberhouse
- Owner: The Lakeside Inn and Casino
- Previous names: Tahoe Sky Harbor (1946–1957); Fabulous Eddie's Stardust Club (1957–1969); Caesars Inn (1969–1972); Harvey's Inn (1972–1985)
- Renovated in: 1957: Fabulous Eddie's Stardust Club; 1969: Caesars Inn; 1972: Harvey's Inn; 1985: Lakeside Inn
- Website: lakesideinn.com

Lakeside Inn (formerly Tahoe Sky Harbor, Fabulous Eddie's Stardust Club, Caesars Inn and Harvey's Inn) was a hotel and casino located in Stateline, Nevada. It had 123 rooms, as well as two restaurants, three bars and a casino with 17,852 square feet (1,658.5 m^{2}) of space.

== History ==
The Inn was originally a smaller casino called Caesars Inn, opened in 1969 with five table games and 100 slot machines and operated by Grover L. Rowland, B. A. Stunz, and Herbert Fisher.

In 1972, Harvey A. Gross (owner of Harvey's Resort Hotel along the state line about a mile to the southwest) bought Caesars Inn and surrounding land, including the old Tahoe Sky Harbor airport and casino site to the north (which also housed Fabulous Eddie's Stardust Club in the late 1950s), and expanded the property to include about 130 rooms.

During renovations to the Harvey's Inn in 1973, while workers were welding in the remodeled casino, a fire broke out, heavily damaging the new casino area and motel lobby and resulting in water damage to the restaurant area.

Following the death of Harvey A. Gross, Harvey's Inn was sold in 1985.

On May 24, 1985, Lakeside Inn opened, under president and general manager Rick Jorgenson.

On April 14, 2020, it was announced that Lakeside Inn would close permanently due to the economic impact of the COVID-19 pandemic.

The shuttered casino was purchased in May 2021 by Barton Health for $13 million, with plans to demolish it and build a healthcare facility.
