= Stateline Country Club =

Coordinates: 38.959°N 119.941°W

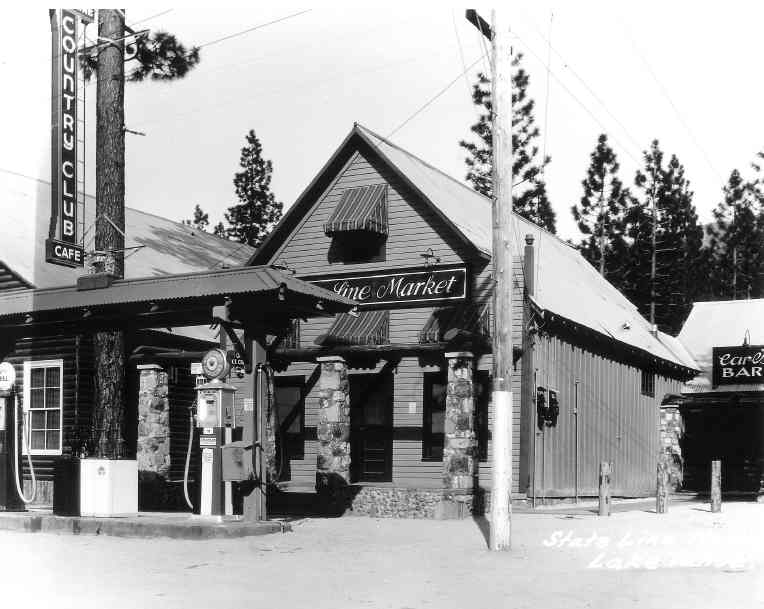
Carl F. Tychsen's Stateline Market and Carl's Place club are shown to the right of the Stateline Country Club around 1935.

The Stateline Country Club, just inside the state border in what is now Stateline, Nevada, started as a small cafe. Inside, visitors enjoying the early 1930s at Lake Tahoe could find a soda fountain bar and a few tables to enjoy a meal. There was a small room in the rear where a poker game started-up most nights, and next door there was provision for vacationers at Carl F. Tychsen's Stateline Market with a pair of gas pumps nearby.

To the rear of the Stateline Market, east of Clyde Beecher's Nevada Club 100 feet from the actual state line between California and Nevada, Carl's Place Bar & Club attracted an older crowd of visitors. (Carl's Place would become The Main Entrance Club in 1938, owned by Charles Silver and George "Frenchy" Perry, with a long canopy extending from the club down the alley to U.S. Highway 50 between the Stateline Market and the Nevada Club.)

== History ==
When Nevada legalized gambling in 1931, Cal Custer, a long-time rum-runner from Southern California, purchased the club and expanded the operation to include a 21 table, tub-style craps game, and a dozen slot machines. The following summer, Cal expanded again, and by 1933, Nick Abelman of Reno and his partners Steve Pavlovich and Bert Riddick were very interested in the sixteen-acre property.

The partners talked Custer down from his $100,000 asking price to $84,000 and purchased the club and property. Abelman, always a stickler for providing a superior product, immediately spent $48,000 building an expansion that offered a large, hard-wood dance floor and a huge fireplace. In the back of the club under a row of chandeliers was a small stage where a band played every night.

The club offered dozens of slot machines, roulette, chuck-a-luck, faro, and 21. It prospered for years under the watchful eye of Steve Pavlovich, who managed the club most summers. Big-name entertainment was standard, and the club offered wonderful meals such as a crab cocktail, soup and a main course like "famous Louisiana frog legs," Idaho Trout," or a filet mignon, plus vegetables, potatoes, and a nice dessert for $2.50.

In the mid 1940s, as Nick Abelman approached the age of seventy, he admitted it was becoming tougher and tougher to make the trek from Reno to Tahoe every day, and his manager, Pavlovich was too sick to handle the club alone. The three partners conferred and agreed it was time to sell.

At a meeting at the St. Francis Hotel in San Francisco, Abelman came to terms with Nick and Eddie Sahati to purchase the club. A final price of $350,000 was agreed to, and the Sahati brothers took over for the 1945 summer season.

They got off to a rocky start, but eventually the club prospered under their management. Entertainers such as Lena Horne, Sons of the Pioneers, and the Ink Spots brought gamblers into the club, and times were good.

Following Carl F. Tychsen's death, his Stateline Market was auctioned to Edmond Sahati, who turned it into the Itahas Lodge ("Sahati" spelled backwards) next to Sahati's Stateline Country Club. The Itahas Lodge later became Sahatis Club.

Eddie Sahati died of cancer in 1952 at the age of 41. His brother, Nick, then leased the Stateline Country Club and Sahatis Club to a group of businessmen including Paul Venturi, Anthony Grech (who also ran Tony's Slot Machine Bar across the street, between George's Gateway Club and the California state line), and Karl Berge, who ran the bar (Berge later owned Karl's Silver Club in Sparks). Sahatis Club was renamed to the Stateline Redwood Room, next to the Stateline Country Club, from 1954 to 1956.

In 1955, Bill Harrah had purchased George's Gateway Club, across U.S. Highway 50 from the Stateline Country Club, and after a successful couple of years was able to persuade the businessmen to give up their lease so Nick Sahati could sell the property to Harrah.

In 1958, Nick Sahati did just that, for the same $350,000 he purchased it for. Eventually, Harrah also purchased Beecher's Nevada Club, allowing him to expand all the way to the actual state line. Harrah's Lake Tahoe now sits on the site.
