= Stateline, California =

Stateline
- Former unincorporated community District of South Lake Tahoe
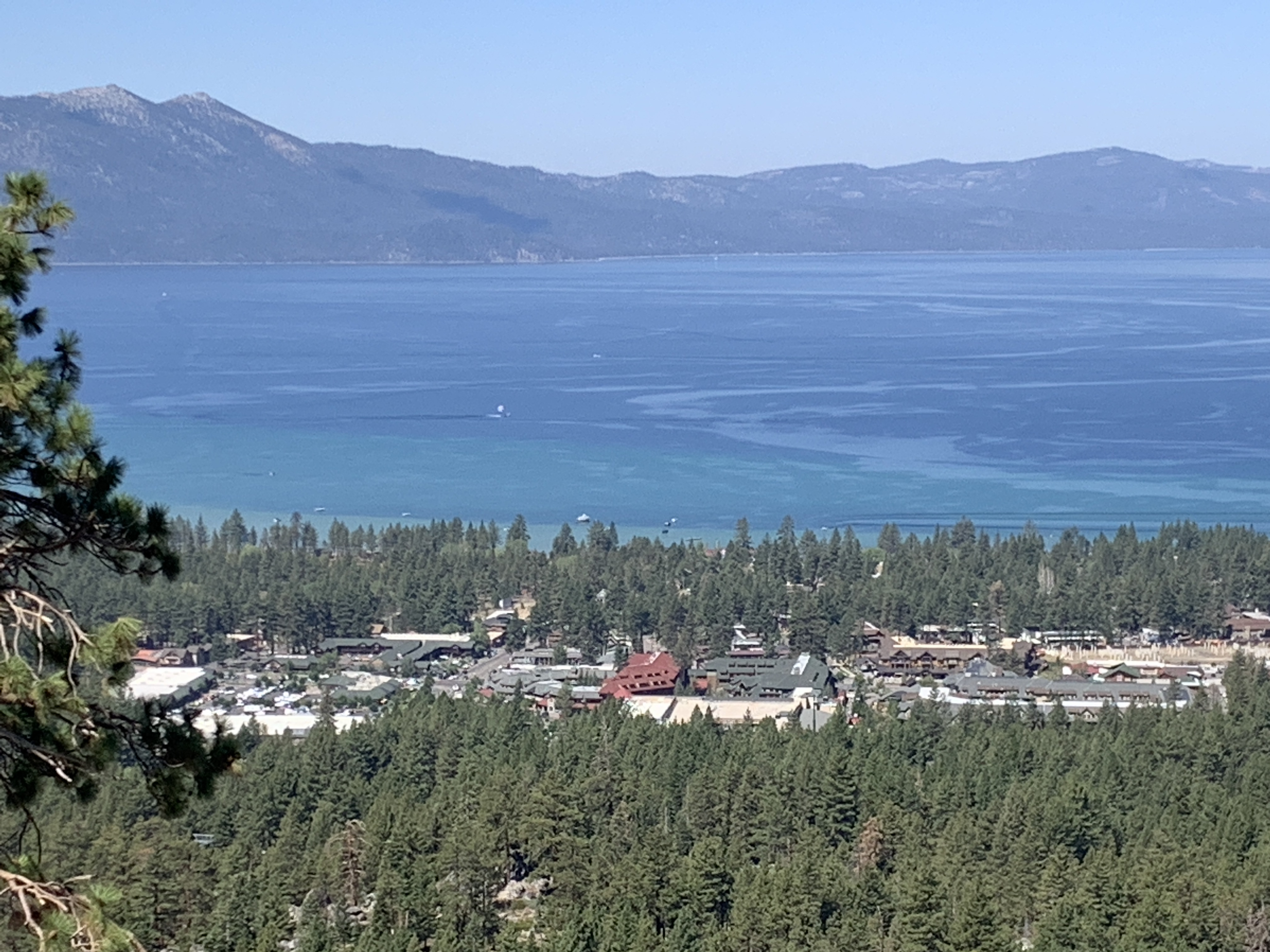

- Location in California
- Coordinates: 38°57′30″N 119°56′38″W
- Country: United States
- State: California
- County: El Dorado County
- City: South Lake Tahoe
- Settled: 1850s
- Elevation: 6,280 ft (1,914 m)

Stateline (formerly Lakeside and Laphams) is a former unincorporated community in El Dorado County, California, now incorporated into South Lake Tahoe, California. It lies at an elevation of 6,279 feet (1914 m) ASL. As its name suggests, it is at the state line with Nevada, and mirrors the adjacent community of the same name.

The name Laphams commemorates William W. Lapham who opened a hotel here in the 1850s. The pony express route ran through the community circa 1861 on the leg between Friday's Station and Yanks. A post office operated at Stateline from 1901. It was along the Lincoln Highway Sierra Nevada Southern Route by 1916. The locale acquired the name Lakeside between 1930 and 1955; then was changed to Stateline thereafter. The community was a subject in an interstate border dispute. After a 1980 US Supreme Court ruling, the community of Stateline was nominally moved east, and the California portion dissolved into South Lake Tahoe. The currently accepted interstate border is marked by the 1893 US CGS Federal Survey Monuments No. 1, No. 2, and No.3. Disturbing survey monuments is illegal. as is land title fraud.
