= Stateline, Nevada =

- CDP
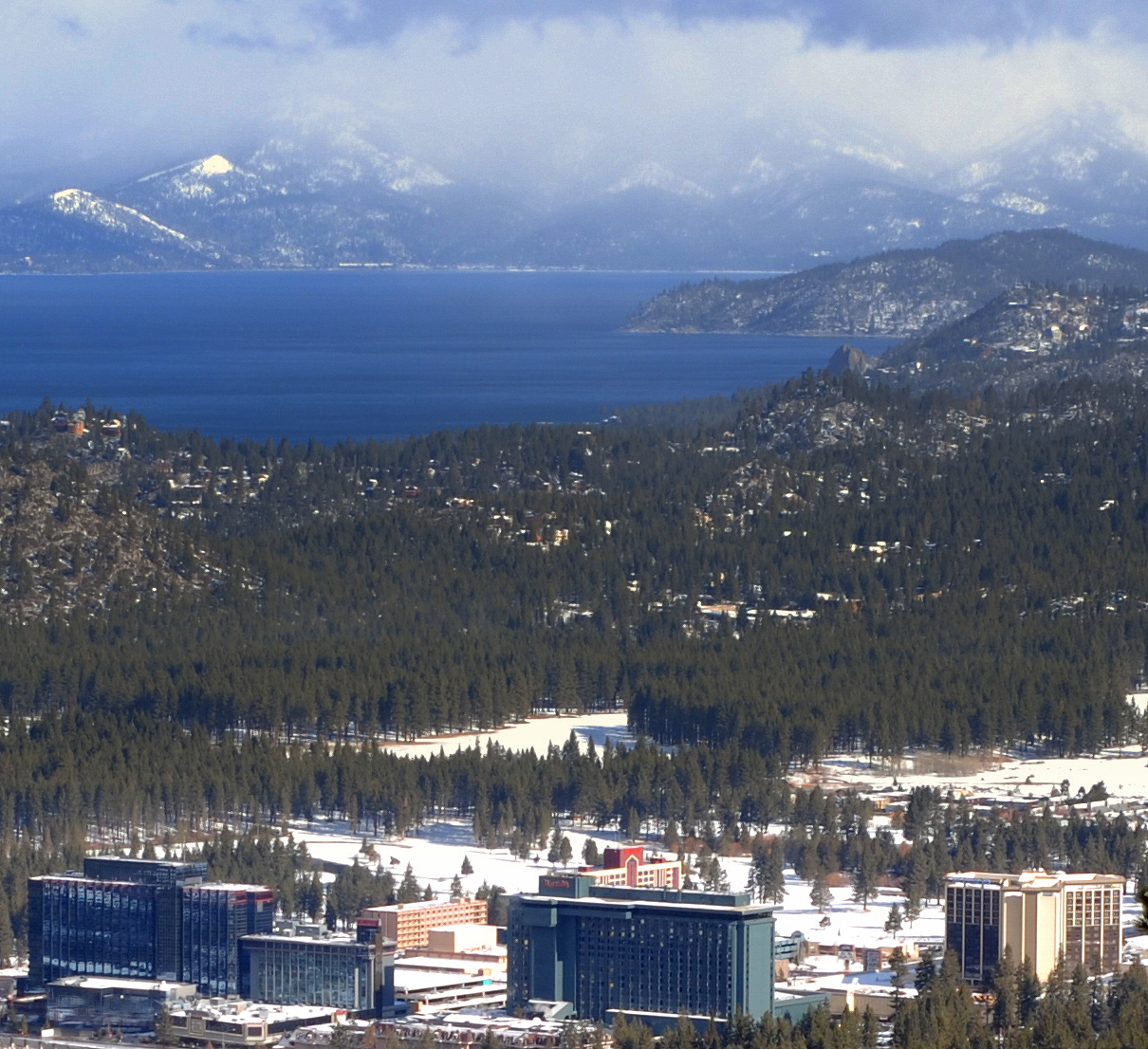
- View of Stateline from near Heavenly Mountain Resort. Lake Tahoe in background.

- Location of Stateline, Nevada
- Coordinates: 38°58′14″N 119°56′45″W
- Country: United States
- State: Nevada
- County: Douglas

Area
  - Total: 0.82 sq mi (2.13 km^{2})
  - Land: 0.72 sq mi (1.86 km^{2})
  - Water: 0.10 sq mi (0.27 km^{2})
- Elevation: 6,283 ft (1,915 m)

Population (2020)
  - Total: 595
  - Density: 827.9/sq mi (319.67/km^{2})
- Time zone: UTC-8 (Pacific (PST))
  - Summer (DST): UTC-7 (PDT)
- ZIP code: 89449
- Area code: 775
- FIPS code: 32-69200
- GNIS feature ID: 0858448

Stateline is a census-designated place (CDP) on the southeastern shore of Lake Tahoe in Douglas County, Nevada, United States. It lies next to the border with California and is conurbated with South Lake Tahoe. The population was 595 at the 2020 census. The population swells considerably during the busy winter and summer seasons, due to the high number of hotel rooms and rental accommodations available.

== Attractions ==
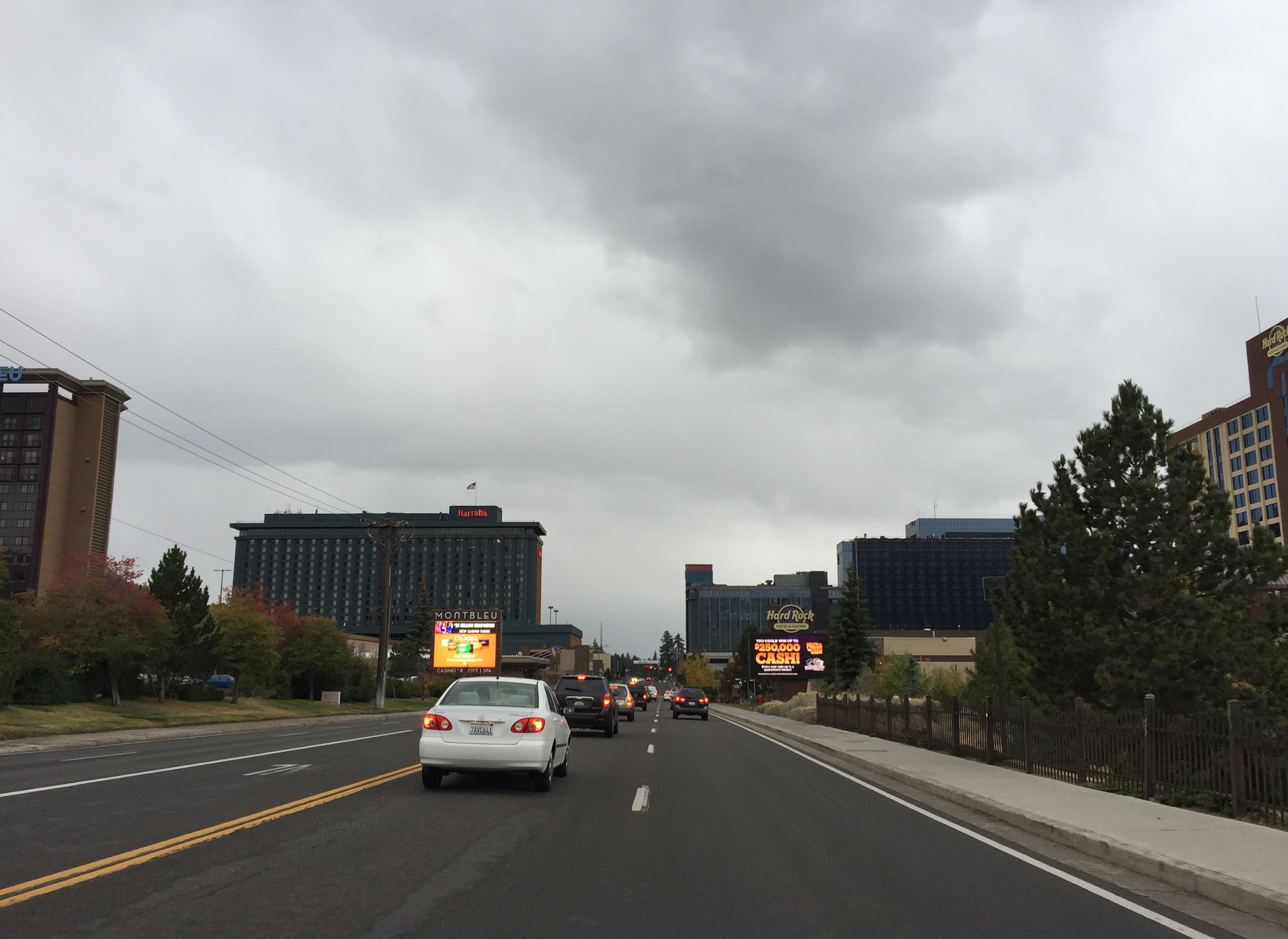
Westbound view along U.S. Route 50 in central Stateline, October 2015

Stateline is home to four casino resorts: Bally's Lake Tahoe (formerly Caesars Tahoe and MontBleu), Caesars Republic Lake Tahoe (formerly Harveys), Golden Nugget Lake Tahoe (formerly Horizon and Hard Rock), and Harrah's Lake Tahoe. Until its closure on April 14, 2020, the Lakeside Inn catered to locals and modest gamblers.

Many of the hotels in the neighboring city of South Lake Tahoe, California, organize buses to take residents to the casinos in Stateline. Stateline and South Lake Tahoe are effectively a single settlement, with the state line intersecting with U.S. Route 50 immediately after the Caesars Republic and Harrah's casinos. As commercial gambling establishments are illegal in California unless built on Indian reservations, the casinos are extremely popular with California residents due to their strategic location right on the state line.

The Edgewood Tahoe Resort golf course lies along the Lake Tahoe shoreline. The Heavenly Mountain Resort ski area is on the California–Nevada border.

Another well-known feature of Stateline is Kingsbury Grade, which runs up and over a mountain pass, rising from Lake Tahoe and dropping down to the Carson Valley on the other side. Most of Stateline's residential and seasonal accommodation, amenities and services are located on or near Kingsbury Grade. The route can be difficult in the winter months and snow chains are essential during this time. Larger vehicles are required to allow traffic to pass when five or more vehicles are queued behind them.

Another new attraction is the brand-new Tahoe Blue Event Center, an arena that plays host to many events and is home to the Tahoe Knight Monsters hockey team of the ECHL.

== Notable events ==
- 40 Pounds of Trouble (1962) was filmed at Harvey's Resort Hotel and Harrah's Lake Tahoe
- The Harvey's Resort Hotel bombing occurred on August 26–27, 1980. The event ended when the bomb was inadvertently detonated during an attempt to disarm it. As a result, the north side of the building was destroyed.
- On the afternoon of January 5, 1998, the Heavenly Ski Resort was the scene of the death of musician and politician Sonny Bono. While skiing alone, Bono struck a tree on "Orion", an intermediate slope high on Heavenly's Nevada side, in Stateline.
- In July 2006, the penthouse of Harrah's Lake Tahoe in Stateline was allegedly the site of a rendezvous between Donald Trump and Stormy Daniels, which led to the Stormy Daniels–Donald Trump scandal. The encounter reportedly happened during that year's American Century Championship celebrity golf tournament, held at the nearby Edgewood Tahoe Resort.
- The 2007 film Smokin' Aces was filmed (known at the time) at the Horizon and the MontBleu Resort Casino & Spa (fictionalized in-film as the "Nomad") featuring many views of the shore from Aces' suite at the casino.

== History ==
Most of the town and surrounding land has been maintained by the heirs of the historic Friday's Station of the Pony Express; it is leased to the casinos. The duplex naming of the community originated in part because of an interstate border dispute, resulting from differences in several boundary surveys. The erroneous 1872 Von Schmidt survey of the California–Nevada boundary found the stateline crossing U.S. 50 on the west edge of present-day Applebee's, and the east edge of the Ashley Marcus Gallery in Tahoe Crescent V Shopping Center in California. The community of Stateline, California, contended to be in Nevada, emerged just east to benefit from Nevada law—including tax-free status and later gambling which was legalized in 1931. However, an 1893 United States Coast and Geodetic Survey (C.G.S.) placed the border several thousand feet east of 1872 Von Schmidt line, creating a discrepancy which left the community in legal jeopardy. The Stateline Country Club operated in the 1930s. By the mid-1950s to mid-1960s, gambling development moved east across the 1893 C.G.S. line to a new adjacent community of Edgewood, Nevada. After a 1980 US Supreme Court ruling, the east-migrated gambling community of Edgewood formally regained its name Stateline, this time in NV.; the California portion which had been contested by Nevada was dissolved into the city of South Lake Tahoe. The currently accepted interstate border is marked by the 1893 US CGS Federal Survey Monuments No. 1, No. 2, and No. 3.

== Geography ==
Stateline is located at 38°58′14″N 119°56′45″W (38.970512, −119.945714). It lies on the southern shore of Lake Tahoe to the east of the California–Nevada state line from which it takes its name, and the city of South Lake Tahoe, California.

According to the United States Census Bureau, the CDP has a total area of 0.8 square miles (2.1 km^{2}), of which 0.7 square miles (1.8 km^{2}) is land and 0.1 square miles (0.26 km^{2}) (12.82%) is water.

== Demographics ==
Historical population
| Census | Pop. | Note | %± |
|---|---|---|---|
| 1990 | 1,379 | | — |
| 2000 | 1,215 | | −11.9% |
| 2010 | 842 | | −30.7% |
| 2020 | 595 | | −29.3% |
U.S. Decennial Census

As of the census of 2000, there were 1,215 people, 510 households, and 245 families residing in the CDP. The population density was 1,803.3 inhabitants per square mile (696.3/km^{2}). There were 562 housing units at an average density of 834.1 per square mile (322.0/km^{2}). The racial makeup of the CDP was 73.7% White, 1.2% African American, 0.7% Native American, 8.2% Asian, 0.2% Pacific Islander, 13.0% from other races, and 3.1% from two or more races. Hispanic or Latino of any race were 29.0% of the population.

There were 510 households, out of which 25.7% had children under the age of 18 living with them, 33.7% were married couples living together, 7.3% had a female householder with no husband present, and 51.8% were non-families. 36.3% of all households were made up of individuals, and 9.2% had someone living alone who was 65 years of age or older. The average household size was 2.38 and the average family size was 3.24.

In the CDP, the population was spread out, with 24.3% under the age of 18, 8.9% from 18 to 24, 35.6% from 25 to 44, 23.0% from 45 to 64, and 8.1% who were 65 years of age or older. The median age was 35 years. For every 100 females, there were 124.2 males. For every 100 females aged 18 and over, there were 126.0 males.

The median income for a household in the CDP was $28,641, and the median income for a family was $32,167. Males had a median income of $28,309 versus $20,625 for females. The per capita income for the CDP was $16,084. About 13.4% of families and 12.7% of the population were below the poverty line, including 16.0% of those under age 18 and 8.5% of those aged 65 or over.

== Transportation ==
U.S. Route 50 traverses Stateline on its way east towards Carson City and west towards Sacramento. Nevada State Route 207 connects Stateline to the Douglas County seat, Minden.

An express bus runs from the Stateline casinos to Reno–Tahoe International Airport. Seasonal shuttles operate to the ski resorts and casinos from South Lake Tahoe.

== See also ==
- List of census-designated places in Nevada
