= Caesars Republic Lake Tahoe =

Resort and casino in Stateline, Nevada

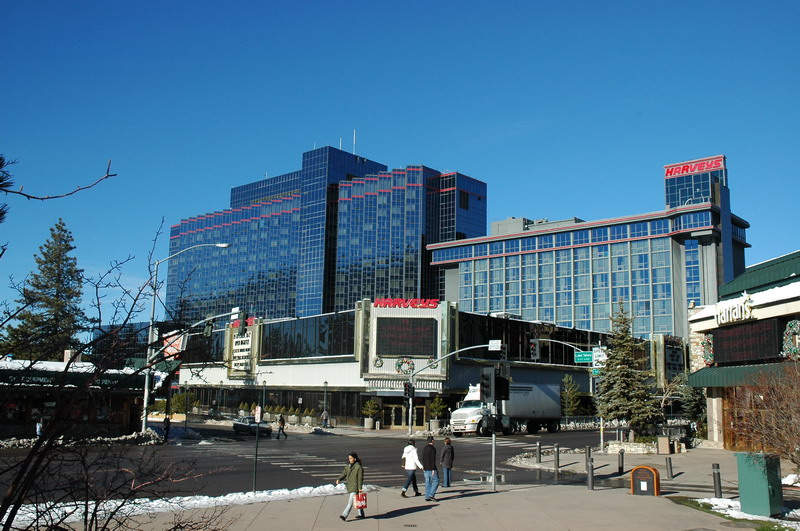
- Interactive map of Caesars Republic Lake Tahoe
- Location: Stateline, Nevada, U.S.; 18 U.S. Route 50; 38.9603°N 119.9424°W
- Opened: 1944; 82 years ago
- Theme: Pavilion
- No. of rooms: 742
- Gaming space: 87,500 sq ft (8,130 m^{2})
- Notable restaurants: Taco. Cantina; Carvel; Cinnabon; Hell’s Kitchen; Sage Room; Starbucks; Joe’s Sports Bar & Grille
- Owner: Vici Properties
- Operating license holder: Caesars Entertainment
- Architect: Martin Stern, Jr. and Associates
- Previous names: Harveys Wagon Wheel Saloon & Gaming Hall (1944-1985); Harveys Wagon Wheel (1986); Harveys Lake Tahoe (1986-2025)
- Renovated in: 1963: 11-story Mountain Tower; 1986: 19-story Tahoe Tower; 2020: Tahoe Tower
- Website: caesars.com/harveys-tahoe

Caesars Republic Lake Tahoe (formerly Harveys Lake Tahoe) is a hotel and casino located in Stateline, Nevada, kitty-corner from the original Caesars Tahoe. It has 742 rooms and suites as well as six restaurants and a casino with 87,500 square feet (8,130 m^{2}) of space. It also has a video arcade, wedding chapel, pool, convention center and a full-service health club. It is owned by Vici Properties and operated by Caesars Entertainment.

== History ==
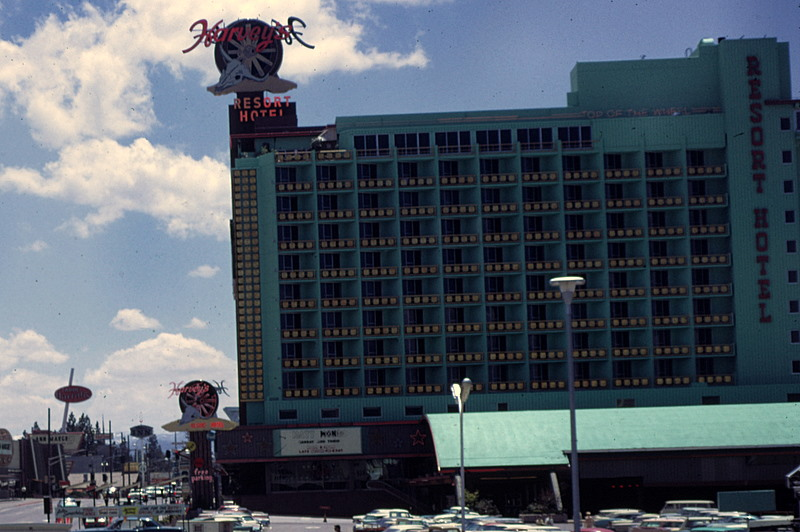
Harvey's Resort Hotel in the late 1970s. Across the street, Harrah's only had a casino and no hotel yet; its hotel was built in the early 1970s.

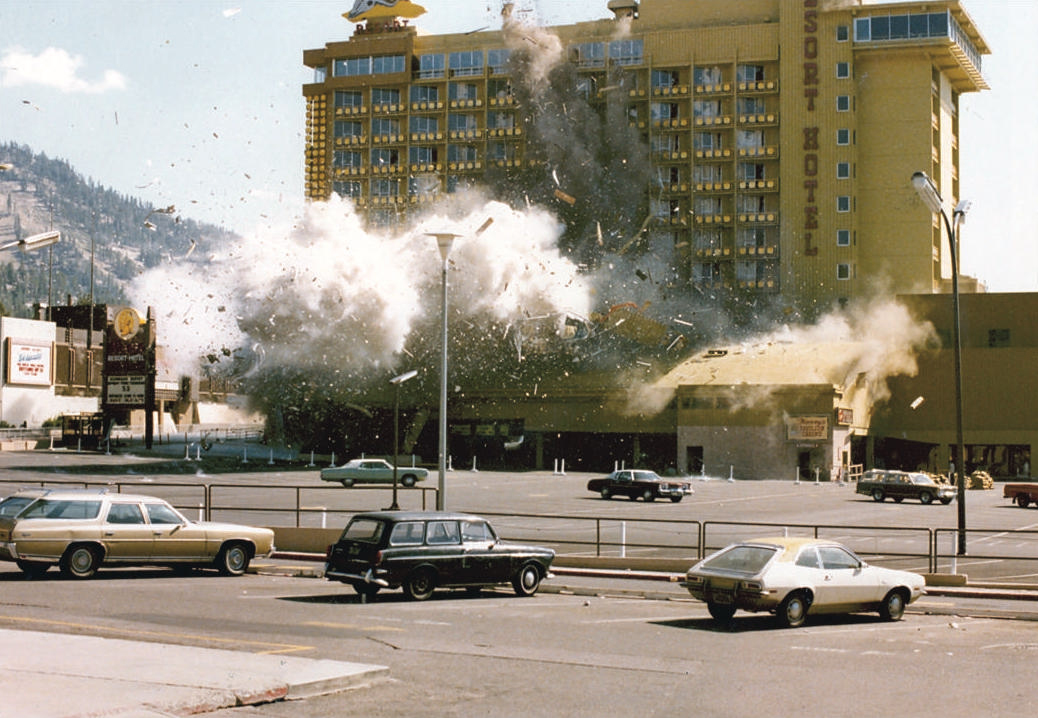
The 1980 explosion that destroyed three floors of the hotel.

Harvey's was originally opened in 1944 and operated by Sacramento meat wholesaler Harvey Gross and his wife Llewellyn. They opened the first high rise tower and an 11-story, 197-room hotel in Nevada just across the state line from South Lake Tahoe, California in 1963.

The hotel suffered an explosion from a bomb on August 27, 1980, that left a crater three stories deep when it was detonated by the FBI. (The area around the hotel had been cleared and no one was injured.) The bomb caused an estimated $18 million ($64 million in 2025) in damages. Parts of Harvey's casino reopened within 48 hours, and the fully repaired and renovated hotel reopened in May 1981. The bomb was placed by John Birges, a heavily in-debt Fresno landscaper who had lost at least $1 million at casinos in Stateline and was hoping to extort $3 million from the bomb threat. He was convicted and sentenced to life in prison without the possibility of parole, where he died from liver cancer in 1996.

In 1983, Harvey Gross died at the age of 78; however, the company continued to operate under family management. In 1985, Harveys sold Harvey's Inn, northeast of Stateline, which reopened as the Lakeside Inn. The 18-story, $74 million, glass "Lake Tower" opened in 1986, the same year the trademark "Wagon Wheel" was replaced on the 11-story tower with the current Harveys brand.

In early 1992, Harveys entered a bidding war with Hilton Hotels Corporation over the right to buy Bally's Reno, which opened on May 3, 1978, as MGM Grand Reno (now Grand Sierra Resort). Harveys announced an agreement on a $71 million deal, only to see Hilton up the ante to $73 million and assumption of Bally's debt. Several weeks later, after considering even higher bids, a federal bankruptcy court settled the matter by approving Hilton's final $83 million offer.

After going public on February 15, 1994, Harveys began new projects including a joint venture with Hard Rock America for an $80 million casino in Las Vegas, which it later sold its interest in 1997 and then a casino resort in Central City, Colorado. A riverboat casino-convention center in Council Bluffs, Iowa, followed in early 1996.

In the late 1990s, Bill Cosby was signed on as the spokesman for Harveys. This included putting the actor's likeness on several of the casino chips and recording several specials at the casino.

In 1999, Colony Capital bought a controlling interest in Harveys Casino Resorts. Harveys announced on April 24, 2001, that it would be acquired by Harrah's Entertainment (later Caesars Entertainment) for $625 million.

On October 6, 2017, ownership of the property was transferred to Vici Properties as part of a corporate spin-off, and it was leased back to Caesars Entertainment.

In 2026, Harveys Lake Tahoe was rebranded as Caesars Republic Lake Tahoe. The renovation included changes to the casino floor, hotel lobby and other areas with new carpeting, lighting, tables, chairs and digital displays. The resort also remodeled all of the rooms in the Remus Tower and planned to introduce butler service for select suites in both of the hotel towers.
